= Glace Bay (disambiguation) =

Glace Bay may refer to:

- Glace Bay (Scottish Gaelic: Glasbaidh), a town on Cape Breton, Nova Scotia, Canada
- Baie de Glace (French: Ice Bay), the harbour at Glace Bay, Cape Breton, Nova Scotia, Canada
- HMCS Glace Bay, several ships of the Royal Canadian Navy
- Glace Bay-Dominion, formerly "Glace Bay", a provincial electoral district of Nova Scotia, Canada, on Cape Breton Island
- Glace Bay High School, Glace Bay, Cape Breton, Nova Scotia, Canada

== See also ==
- Big Glace Bay, Cape Breton, Nova Scotia, Canada
