= Bay High School =

Bay High School or Bays High School can refer to one of the following high schools:

== In Australia ==
- Batemans Bay High School, Batemans Bay, New South Wales
- Byron Bay High School, Byron Bay, New South Wales
- Maroubra Bay High School, Marouba, New South Wales
- Warners Bay High School, Warners Bay, New South Wales
- Geilston Bay High School, Geilston Bay, Tasmania
- Rose Bay High School, Rose Bay, Tasmania
- Montrose Bay High School, Rosetta, Tasmania
- Trinity Bay State High School, Cairns, Queensland
- Deception Bay State High School, Deception Bay, Queensland
- Safety Bay Senior High School, Safety Bay, Western Australia

== In Canada ==
- Oak Bay High School, Oak Bay, British Columbia
- Glace Bay High School, Glace Bay, Nova Scotia
- Morrison Glace Bay High School, Glace Bay, Nova Scotia

== In Jamaica ==
- Morant Bay High School, Morant Bay, St Thomas

== In Pakistan ==
- Bay View High School (Karachi), Karachi

== In South Africa ==
- Camps Bay High School, Cape Town, Western Cape
- False Bay High School, Strand, Western Cape

== In the United Kingdom ==
- Herne Bay High School, Herne Bay, Kent, England
- Whitley Bay High School, Whitley Bay, North Tyneside, England

== In the United States ==
- Red Bay High School, Red Bay, Alabama
- Bay High School (Arkansas), Bay, Arkansas
- Granite Bay High School, Granite Bay, California
- Half Moon Bay High School, Half Moon Bay, California
- Morro Bay High School, Moro Bay, California
- Mission Bay Senior High School, San Diego, California
- Lemon Bay High School, Englewood, Florida
- East Bay High School, Gibsonton, Florida
- Palm Bay Magnet High School, Melbourne, Florida
- Tampa Bay Technical High School, Tampa, Florida
- Bay High School (Florida), Panama City, Florida
- Cypress Bay High School, Weston, Florida
- Casco Bay High School, Portland, Maine
- Dollar Bay High School, Dollar Bay, Michigan
- Anchor Bay High School, Fair Haven, Michigan
- Bay High School (Mississippi), Bay St. Louis, Mississippi
- Sheepshead Bay High School, Brooklyn, New York City, New York
- Bay Shore High School, Bay Shore, New York
- Oyster Bay High School, Oyster Bay, New York
- Hampton Bays High School, Southampton, New York
- Bay High School (Ohio), Bay Village, Ohio
- Put-in-Bay High School, Put-In-Bay, Ohio
- Carvers Bay High School, Hemingway, South Carolina
- Cane Bay High School, Summerville, South Carolina
- Bay City High School, Bay City, Texas
- Hudson's Bay High School, Vancouver, Washington
- Bay View High School, Bay View, Milwaukee, Wisconsin
- Green Bay East High School, Green Bay, Wisconsin
- Green Bay Southwest High School, Green Bay, Wisconsin
- Green Bay West High School, Green Bay, Wisconsin
- Sturgeon Bay High School, Sturgeon Bay, Wisconsin
- Bay Port High School, Suamico, Wisconsin
- Whitefish Bay High School, Whitefish Bay, Wisconsin
- Williams Bay High School, Williams Bay, Wisconsin

== In New Zealand ==
- Golden Bay High School, Golden Bay
- Green Bay High School, Green Bay
