= Reeves Matheson =

Canadian politician

MLA for Cape Breton East
- In office March 24, 1998 – July 27, 1999
- Preceded by: John MacEachern
- Succeeded by: David Wilson

Personal details
- Born: 1952 (age 73–74) Glace Bay, Nova Scotia
- Party: New Democratic Party (1998); Independent (1998–1999)
- Occupation: lawyer

Reeves Matheson (born 1952) is a Canadian politician. He represented the electoral district of Cape Breton East in the Nova Scotia House of Assembly from 1998 to 1999. He was a member of the Nova Scotia New Democratic Party.

== Early life and education ==
Born in 1952 at Glace Bay, Nova Scotia, Matheson was educated at Saint Mary's University, and Dalhousie Law School, where he graduated in 1976.

He practiced law in Glace Bay, and served for ten years as town solicitor.

== Political career ==
Matheson first attempted to enter provincial politics in a 1980 byelection for the Cape Breton East riding, where he placed second, losing to Progressive Conservative Donnie MacLeod by 1500 votes. In the 1998 election, Matheson defeated his closest opponent by over 2100 votes to win the seat. On April 2, 1998, Matheson was suspended by the Nova Scotia Barristers' Society for three months pending the outcome of an investigation into a complaint lodged by one of his clients. On May 13, Matheson quit the NDP caucus to sit as an independent. On June 1, Matheson was disbarred after admitting he took thousands of dollars from trust accounts. On December 16, Matheson was charged with four counts of theft, four of fraud, 3 counts of uttering a forged document and one count of breach of trust. Matheson did not reoffer in the 1999 election. In November 2000, Matheson pleaded guilty to five charges, and in April 2001 was given a conditional sentence of two years house arrest, and ordered to reimburse the Nova Scotia Barristers Society $117,000 for the money it gave back to the victims.
