= GBHS =

GBHS WUM may refer to:

- Grey Bruce Health Services, Ontario, Canada

== Schools ==
- Glace Bay High School, Glace Bay, Nova Scotia, Canada
- Glen Burnie High School, Glen Burnie, Maryland, United States
- Gold Beach High School, Gold Beach, Oregon, United States
- Golden Bay High School, Takaka, New Zealand
- Gordon Bell High School, Winnipeg, Manitoba, Canada
- Grand Blanc Community High School, Grand Blanc, Michigan, United States
- Granite Bay High School, Granite Bay, California, United States
- Great Baddow High School, Chelmsford, Essex, England
- Great Bend High School, Great Bend, Kansas, United States
- Great Bridge High School, Chesapeake, Virginia, United States
- Gulf Breeze High School, Gulf Breeze, Florida, United States
