= Daniel R. Cameron =

Canadian politician

Member of the Nova Scotia Legislative Assembly for Cape Breton East
- In office 1928 – October 27, 1933

Mayor of Glace Bay
- In office 1913?–1916
- Preceded by: Gordon S. Harrington
- Succeeded by: Angus J. MacDonald

President of the Union of Nova Scotia Municipalities
- In office 1915?–1916?

Personal details
- Born: February 9, 1885 New Glasgow, Nova Scotia
- Died: October 27, 1933 (aged 48) Glace Bay, Nova Scotia
- Party: Liberal-Conservative Party

Daniel R. Cameron (February 9, 1885 – October 27, 1933) was a lumber merchant and political figure in Nova Scotia, Canada. He represented Cape Breton East in the Nova Scotia House of Assembly from 1928 to 1933 as a Liberal-Conservative member.

He was born in New Glasgow, Nova Scotia, the son of Hugh M. Cameron and Annie Fraser. In 1912, he married Catherine Burchill. Cameron was mayor of Glace Bay from 1913 to 1916. He served as president of the Union of Nova Scotia Municipalities. Cameron died in Glace Bay at the age of 48.
