= Nina Cohen =

Canadian philanthropist (1907–1991)

Nina Cohen OC
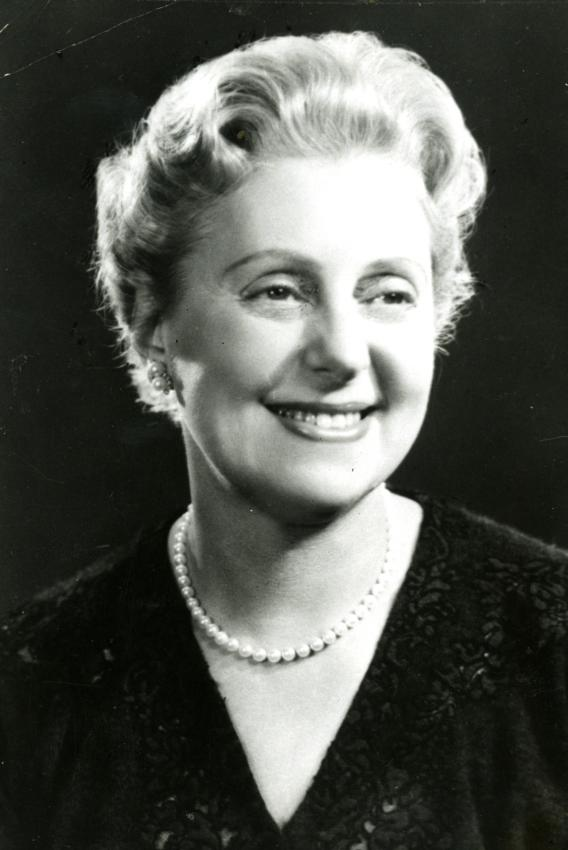
- Born: 1907
- Died: 1991 (aged 83–84)
- Known for: Cape Breton Miners Museum
- Awards: Order of Canada

Nina Cohen OC (1907 – 1991) was a Canadian philanthropist from Nova Scotia who founded the Cape Breton Miners Museum. She was invested as an Officer of the Order of Canada in 1968.

== Biography ==
Cohen was born in 1907 in Glace Bay, Nova Scotia, to parents Max and Rose Fried. She had three siblings. Cohen graduated from Glace Bay High School, and attended secondary school at Mount Allison Ladies College. During her time at the college she married her husband Harry Cohen. Cohen and her husband had one child, later adopting two more children who had become orphaned as a result of the Holocaust.

Cohen founded the local Red Cross Society in Cape Breton, and was the driving force behind the creation of the Cape Breton Miners Museum. She worked to ensure that the Cape Breton Miners Museum could open in time for the Canadian Centennial celebrations. The museum opened on 31 July 1967. Cohen was also known locally for her efforts as chair of Cape Breton's tourist association board, and as national President of Hadassah-WIZO.

Cohen was invested as an Officer of the Order of Canada on 26 April 1968.
