= Dave Wilson (Cape Breton politician) =

Canadian politician

David Wilson

Member of the Legislative Assembly of Nova Scotia
- In office July 27, 1999 – March 11, 2010
- Preceded by: Reeves Matheson
- Succeeded by: Geoff MacLellan
- Constituency: Glace Bay

Personal details
- Born: November 4, 1955 (age 70) Glace Bay, Nova Scotia
- Party: Liberal
- Spouse: Nancy McPherson
- Occupation: radio and television journalist

Harold David Wilson (born November 4, 1955) is a former Canadian politician and radio personality. He represented the electoral district of Glace Bay in the Nova Scotia House of Assembly from 1999 to 2010. He was a member of the Nova Scotia Liberal Party. He resigned his Glace Bay seat on March 11, 2010, amid controversy, refusing to meet with the provincial auditor general about his MLA expense claims.

Prior to entering politics, Wilson worked in the Cape Breton media for 24 years. He worked for 950 CHER radio, CTV Television, and CJCB Radio, where he hosted the popular "Talkback" radio program.

== Political career ==
Wilson entered provincial politics by running as the Liberal candidate for Cape Breton East in the 1999 election. Results on election night showed Wilson losing to New Democrat Cecil Saccary by five votes, however a judicial recount on August 17 resulted in Wilson being declared the winner by five votes. The NDP appealed the election result to the Supreme Court of Nova Scotia, which resulted in the election results being thrown out, and a new election ordered.

A by-election was announced in February 2000, and Wilson was again nominated as the Liberal candidate. On April 4, 2000, Wilson won the by-election, defeating Saccary by 408 votes. Wilson was re-elected in the 2003, 2006, and 2009 general elections.

In September 2016, Wilson announced he would attempt to re-enter politics, running for a seat on Cape Breton Regional Council in the 2016 municipal election. On October 15, 2016, Wilson was defeated, finishing third in the district.

== Expense scandal ==
In 2010, Wilson abruptly resigned his legislative seat after more than 10 years in office. He quit the seat amid auditor general Jacques Lapointe’s investigation into MLA expenses. Lapointe’s review revealed Wilson's expenses were highlighted by a $400 claim he made for patio furniture. Wilson was scheduled to meet with the province's auditor general in February 2010, but instead skipped the meeting, hired a lawyer, and abruptly resigned.

In a statement released on March 12, 2010, Wilson failed to disclose his reasons for resigning, saying only: "I no longer feel that I can fulfill my duties and responsibilities as the Member of the Legislature Assembly for the Constituency of Glace Bay." He added: "I will not be making any further comments at this time and I would ask for your respect for my families privacy."

On February 14, 2011, it was announced that Wilson was among four people facing criminal charges in connection with the Royal Canadian Mounted Police investigation into 2010s MLA expense scandal. Wilson was charged with fraud exceeding $5,000, breach of trust by a public officer, and 31 counts of uttering a forged document.

On September 13, 2011, Wilson pleaded guilty to one count each of fraud, breach of trust, and uttering forged documents in connection with the spending scandal. The charge of uttering forged documents covers a period stretching from 2006 to 2010 and relates to some 31 incidents of uttering forged expense claims.

In April 2012, Crown prosecutor Andrew MacDonald recommended that Wilson should be jailed for a period of one to two years for defrauding Nova Scotia taxpayers of nearly $61,000 as a way to fuel his "pathological gambling addiction". MacDonald said Wilson’s actions were deliberate and calculated, noting he did not sacrifice his own living standards in securing money to gamble. On April 19, 2012, Wilson was sentenced to nine months in jail and 18 months probation.

== Personal ==
Wilson is married and has three children. His son, Dan Wilson, ran in the byelection for his father's vacated Glace Bay seat, as a candidate for the Atlantica Party, but finished last with 56 votes.
