= HMCS Glace Bay (MM 701) =

Royal Canadian Navy coastal defence vessel

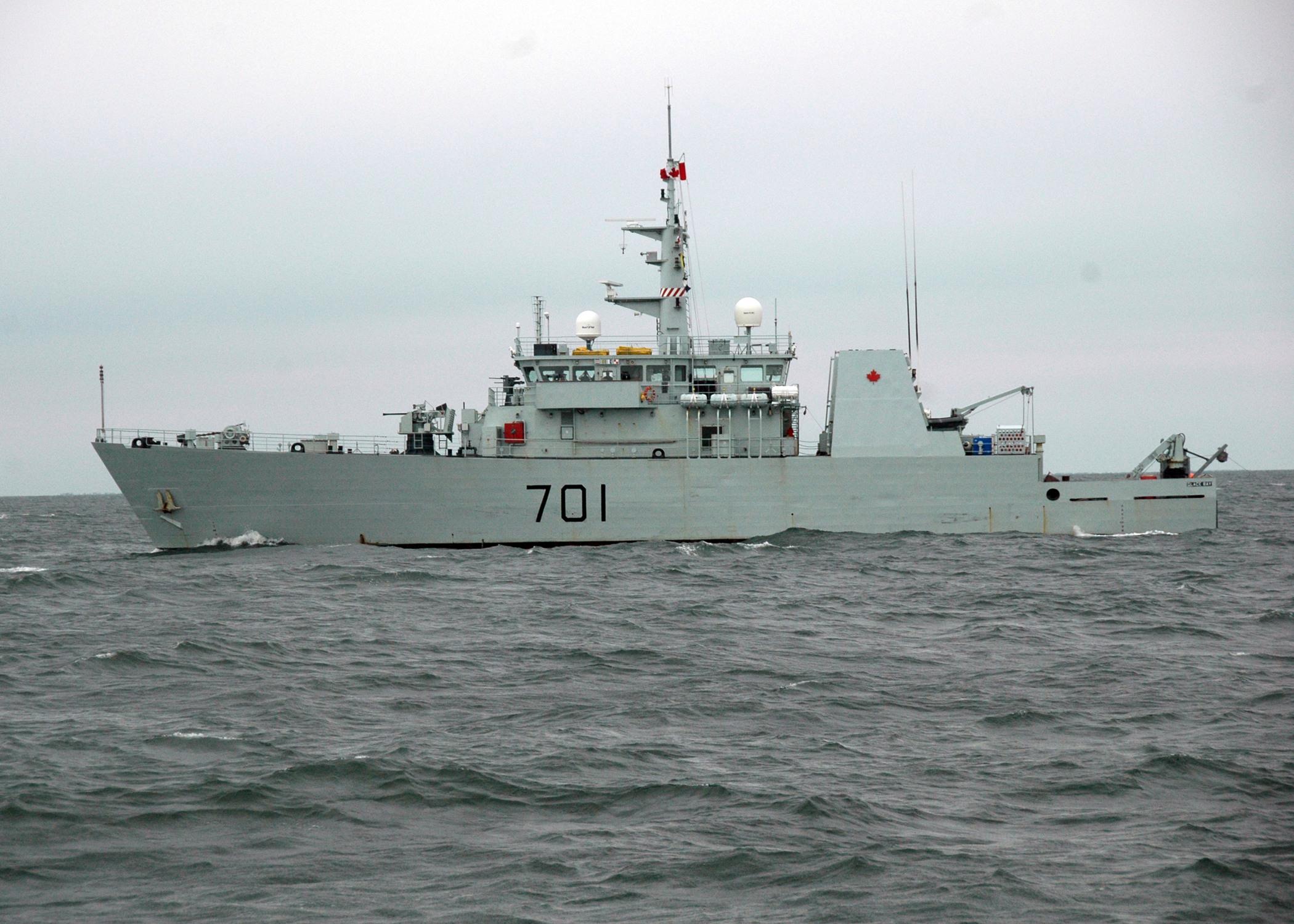
- Glace Bay in the Atlantic Ocean on 9 June 2010

History

Canada
- Name: Glace Bay
- Namesake: Glace Bay, Nova Scotia
- Builder: Halifax Shipyards Ltd., Halifax, Nova Scotia
- Laid down: 28 April 1995
- Launched: 22 January 1996
- Commissioned: 26 October 1996
- Decommissioned: 3 October 2025
- Home port: CFB Halifax
- Identification: Pennant number: MM 701; MMSI number: 316293000; Callsign: CGAU
- Motto: Ex Fundo Maris 'From the depths of the sea'
- Honours and awards: Atlantic, 1944–45
- Status: Decommissioned
- Notes: Colours: Black and white
- Badge: Sable on a pile Argent a thistle proper.

General characteristics
- Class & type: Kingston-class coastal defence vessel
- Displacement: 990 t (970 long tons)
- Length: 55.3 m (181 ft 5 in)
- Beam: 11.3 m (37 ft 1 in)
- Draught: 3.4 m (11 ft 2 in)
- Propulsion: 4 × Jeumont ANR-53-50 alternators, 4 × 600VAC Wärtsilä UD 23V12 diesel engines, 7.2 MW (9,700 hp); 2 × Jeumont CI 560L motors, 2,200 kW (3,000 hp); 2 × LIPS Z drive azimuth thrusters
- Speed: 15 knots (28 km/h; 17 mph)
- Range: 5,000 nmi (9,300 km; 5,800 mi) at 8 kn (15 km/h; 9.2 mph)
- Complement: 37
- Sensors & processing systems: Kelvin Hughes navigation radar (I-band); Kelvin Hughes 6000 surface search radar (E-F band); Global Positioning System; AN/SQS-511 towed side scan sonar; Remote-control Mine Hunting System (RMHS)
- Armament: 1 × Bofors 40 mm/60 Mk 5C gun (removed from the class); 2 × M2 machine guns

HMCS Glace Bay is a decommissioned Kingston-class coastal defence vessel that served in the Canadian Forces and Royal Canadian Navy from 1996 to 2025. Glace Bay is the second ship of her class. She was the second vessel to use the designation HMCS Glace Bay. She was assigned to Maritime Forces Atlantic (MARLANT) and homeported at CFB Halifax.

== Design and description ==
The Kingston class was designed to fill the minesweeper, coastal patrol and reserve training needs of the Canadian Forces, replacing the Bay-class minesweepers, Porte-class gate vessels and Royal Canadian Mounted Police coastal launches in those roles. In order to perform these varied duties the Kingston-class vessels are designed to carry up to three 6.1-metre (20 ft) ISO containers with power hookups on the open deck aft in order to embark mission-specific payloads. The seven module types available for embarkation include four route survey, two mechanical minesweeping and one bottom inspection modules.

The Kingston class displace 986 tonnes (970 long tons) and are 55.3 metres (181 ft 5 in) long overall with a beam 11.3 metres (37 ft 1 in) and a draught of 3.4 metres (11 ft 2 in). The coastal defence vessels are powered by four Jeumont ANR-53-50 alternators coupled to four Wärtsilä UD 23V12 diesel engines creating 7.2 megawatts (9,700 hp). Two LIPS Z-drive azimuth thrusters are driven by two Jeumont CI 560L motors creating 2,200 kilowatts (3,000 hp) and the Z drives can be rotated 360°. This gives the ships a maximum speed of 15 knots (28 km/h; 17 mph) and a range of 5,000 nautical miles (9,300 km; 5,800 mi) at 8 knots (15 km/h; 9.2 mph).

The Kingston class is equipped with a Kelvin Hughes navigational radar using the I band and a Kelvin Hughes 6000 surface search radar scanning the E and F bands. The vessels carry an AN/SQS-511 towed side scan sonar for minesweeping and a Remote-control Mine Hunting System (RMHS). The vessels are equipped with one Bofors 40 mm/60 calibre Mk 5C gun and two M2 machine guns. (Note: The 60 calibre denotes the length of the gun. This means that the length of the gun barrel is 60 times the bore diameter.) The 40 mm gun was declared obsolete and removed from the vessels in 2014. Some of them ended up as museum pieces and on display at naval reserve installations across Canada. The Kingston-class coastal defence vessels have a complement of 37.

== Service history ==
The ship's keel was laid down on 28 April 1995 by Halifax Shipyards Ltd. at Halifax, Nova Scotia, and was launched on 22 January 1996. Glace Bay was commissioned into the Canadian Forces at Sydney, Nova Scotia, on 26 October 1996 and carries the hull number MM 701. In 1997, the coastal defence vessel deployed to the Great Lakes. Following the crash of Swissair Flight 111, Glace Bay was among the vessels sent to search for the downed aircraft in September 1998. The following year, she was sent to the Baltic Sea to participate in minesweeping exercises with NATO.

In November 2009, the Canadian trials for the Boeing Insitu ScanEagle unmanned aircraft system were performed aboard Glace Bay.

In June 2013, Glace Bay and sister ship Kingston were sent on a seven-week tour of the Saint Lawrence Seaway and the Great Lakes, making several port calls along the way. In 2014, she was deployed to serve in Operation Caribbe. During the ship's deployment, in collaboration with the United States Coast Guard, the vessel seized a large shipment of cocaine valued at $84 million. In October 2018, Glace Bay was among the Canadian ships deployed to the North Atlantic and Baltic Sea as part of the large NATO exercise, Trident Juncture. On 17 December 2018 Summerside and Glace Bay were sailing home to Halifax from their deployment in European waters when they were called to the aid of the sailing vessel Makena which had been disabled 440 kilometres (270 mi) southeast of Halifax. Summerside and Glace Bay took part in the rescue of the four crew members of Makena by a Royal Canadian Air Force Cormorant helicopter, with additional support by a United States C-130 Hercules aircraft.

On 26 January 2020, Glace Bay and Shawinigan departed Halifax as part of Operation Projection off West Africa. Once there, the two vessels were to take part in two naval exercises Obangame Express and Phoenix Express. They were recalled in March during the COVID-19 pandemic after their exercises were cancelled. They returned to Halifax on 9 April. In August 2020, Glace Bay was deployed to the Arctic as part of Operation Nanook along with MV Asterix and HMCS Ville de Québec from the Royal Canadian Navy and warships from the Danish, French, U.S. navies.

In January 2023, Glace Bay and sister ship Moncton sailed from Halifax for operations off West Africa in the Gulf of Guinea, participating in several exercises and diplomatic engagements in the area. However, with the situation in Haiti worsening, the Canadian government redeployed the two ships to the seas off that nation's capital Port-au-Prince for patrols in February. In June 2023, Glace Bay was part of a fleet of vessels that took part in the search for the submersible Titan which went missing near the wreck of Titanic.

In July 2025 it was announced that Glace Bay and seven of her sister ships would be decommissioned before the end of the year. The ship was decommissioned on 3 October 2025 at Halifax.
