= Green Bay High School =

Green Bay High School may refer to one of the following schools:

== New Zealand ==
- Green Bay High School, Auckland, a secondary school in the Auckland suburb of Green Bay

== United States ==
- Green Bay East High School, a public school that serves the east side of Green Bay, Wisconsin
- Green Bay Southwest High School, a public school that serves the Green Bay, Wisconsin area
- Green Bay West High School, a public school that serves the west side of Green Bay, Wisconsin

== See also ==
- Bay High School (disambiguation)
