= John MacEachern =

Canadian politician

The Honourable John MacEachern ECNS

MLA for Cape Breton East
- In office 1988–1998
- Preceded by: Donnie MacLeod
- Succeeded by: Reeves Matheson

Personal details
- Born: November 8, 1946 (age 79) Glace Bay, Nova Scotia
- Party: Liberal
- Occupation: Teacher

John Duncan MacEachern (born November 8, 1946) is a former educator and political figure in Nova Scotia, Canada. He represented Cape Breton East in the Nova Scotia House of Assembly from 1988 to 1998 as a Liberal member.

He was born in Glace Bay, Nova Scotia in 1946 and was educated at St. Francis Xavier University and Dalhousie University. MacEachern was a math and physics teacher and high school vice-principal.

MacEachern entered provincial politics in the 1988 election, defeating Progressive Conservative Bruce Clark by 1,725 votes in the Cape Breton East riding. He was re-elected in the 1993 election by almost 6,000 votes. On June 11, 1993, MacEachern was appointed to the Executive Council of Nova Scotia as Minister of Education and Culture. In 1996, he was shuffled to Minister of Community Services. When Russell MacLellan won the leadership of the Liberal party and became Premier, MacEachern announced he was leaving politics and returning to teaching. He finished his term as MLA for Cape Breton East and finished his teaching career at Glace Bay High School. He is presently a resident of Cape Breton, Nova Scotia and did not seek re-election in 1998.
