= Russell Cunningham (Canadian politician) =

Canadian politician

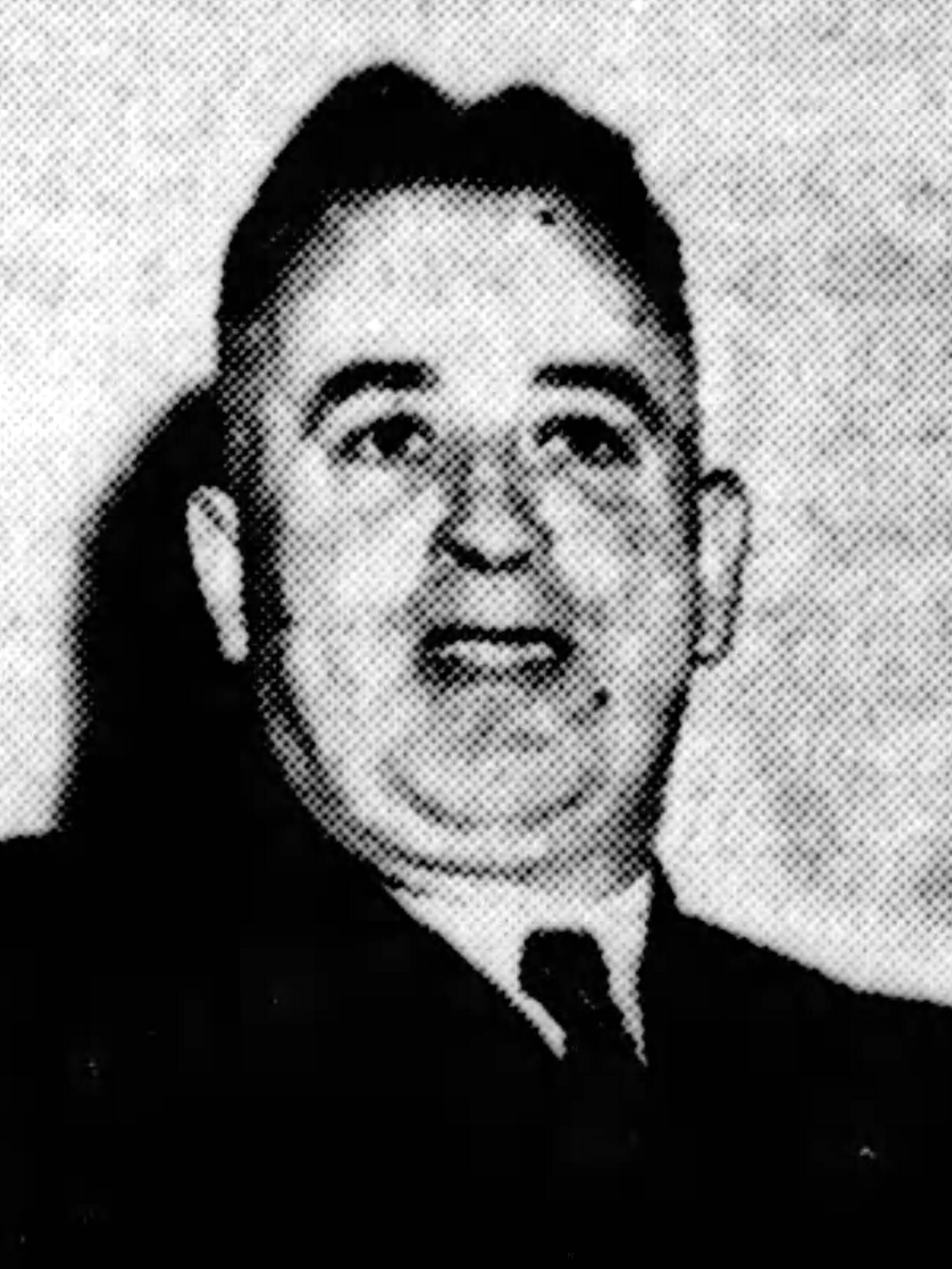
- Cunningham in 1950

Leader of the Nova Scotia Co-operative Commonwealth Federation
- In office 1945–1953
- Preceded by: Donald MacDonald
- Succeeded by: Michael J. MacDonald

Leader of the Opposition of Nova Scotia
- In office 1945–1949
- Preceded by: Fred M. Blois
- Succeeded by: Robert Stanfield

Member of the Legislative Assembly of Nova Scotia for Cape Breton East
- In office October 23, 1945 – October 30, 1956
- Preceded by: Douglas N Brodie
- Succeeded by: N. Layton Fergusson (Conservative)

Personal details
- Born: December 29, 1905 Glace Bay, Nova Scotia
- Died: March 6, 1985 (aged 79)
- Party: Co-operative Commonwealth Federation
- Occupation: Trade Unionist

Russell Cunningham (December 29, 1905 – March 6, 1985) was a Canadian social democratic politician from Cape Breton Island in Nova Scotia. He was the leader of the Co-operative Commonwealth Federation in Nova Scotia from 1945 until 1953. He succeeded Donald MacDonald as the party's leader, after MacDonald lost his seat in the 1945 general election. He represented the electoral district (riding) of Cape Breton East in the Nova Scotia House of Assembly from 1945 until 1956. Due to the Conservatives not electing a single member to the Assembly, Cunningham became the leader of the Official Opposition during the 44th General Assembly of Nova Scotia. Even though the CCF lost a seat, it was the first time they ever were the Official Opposition. Their successor party, the Nova Scotia New Democratic Party (NDP) would not duplicate that accomplishment again until 1998, over 50 years later.

He was born in Glace Bay, Nova Scotia in 1904. Mr. Cunningham met and Married Violet Miller and had eight children. Shirley (Pettigrew), Joan (Roberts), Marilyn (Wheeliker), Robert, David, Donald, Clarence, and Kenneth. They began their wedded life purchasing the Bradbury farm on Big Glace Bay Lake. They moved on to a farm property at Sand Lake and then, in December 1945, purchased the Marconi property (including the radio station VAS, Voice of the Atlantic Seaboard) a few miles out of Glace Bay, NS where they raised their family and resided until he died in 1985 and she in 1989.

== See also ==
- Co-operative Commonwealth Federation
- List of Nova Scotia CCF/NDP members
