= Douglas Neil Brodie =

Canadian politician and businessman

Douglas Neil Brodie (January 15, 1872 – September 14, 1954) was a businessman and political figure in Nova Scotia, Canada. He represented Cape Breton East in the Nova Scotia House of Assembly from 1941 to 1945 as a Co-operative Commonwealth Federation member.

He was born in Halifax, the son of Neil MacNeil Brodie and Margaret Carroll, and educated at the Halifax Academy. In 1901, he married May Campbell. He was the owner of Brodie Print Service. Brodie was a director of the Central Credit Union. He died in Glace Bay at the age of 82.
