= John Morgan (Canadian politician) =

Canadian lawyer, politician and businessman

John W. Morgan

Mayor of Cape Breton Regional Municipality, Nova Scotia
- In office 2000–2012
- Preceded by: David Muise
- Succeeded by: Cecil Clarke

Personal details
- Born: May 7, 1964 (age 62) Glace Bay, Nova Scotia, Canada
- Profession: Lawyer, businessman

John W. Morgan (born May 7, 1964) is a Canadian lawyer, politician, and businessman. He was the mayor of the Cape Breton Regional Municipality (CRBM) in Nova Scotia from 2000 to 2012.

Morgan is a graduate of the University College of Cape Breton and St. Francis Xavier University, where he received a bachelor of science degree, majoring in chemistry and minoring in mathematics. He attended Dalhousie University, where he obtained a master's degree in business administration and a bachelor's degree in law under the combined MBA/LLB degree program, graduating in 1990.

First elected in October 2000, Morgan was re-elected twice (in 2004 and 2008) with over 80% of the votes cast.

Morgan filed a lawsuit on behalf of CBRM against the Government of Nova Scotia alleging unequal per capita provincial funding for his municipality. Morgan had applied to the Nova Scotia Utility and Review Board to reject the Boundary Review, citing the desires of citizens for a downsized municipal council. The eventual decision was that the Boundary Review was flawed and will need to be re-done by 2010.

On August 17, 2012, Morgan released a statement announcing that he would not stand for re-election in the 2012 municipal election. He was succeeded as mayor by Cecil Clarke.

In February 2020, Morgan announced he would run for the New Democratic Party nomination in Glace Bay-Dominion for the following Nova Scotia general election. On August 17, 2021, Morgan was defeated by Progressive Conservative candidate John White by 33 votes. A judicial recount on August 30, 2021, reduced the margin of victory to 29 votes.
