= P. D. Gordon Pugh =

Patterson David Gordon Pugh (19 December 1920 – 15 July 1993), also known as Pat Pugh, was a British orthopaedic surgeon in the Royal Navy and a prolific collector of Staffordshire portrait figures and naval ceramics.

== Early life and training ==
Patterson David Gordon Pugh was born on 19 December 1920 in Carshalton, the son of William Thomas Gordon Pugh, a renowned paediatrician and Medical Superintendent of Queen Mary's Hospital for Children in Carshalton, Surrey. He was educated at Lancing College and Jesus College, Cambridge.

== Career ==
Pugh pursued a successful career in the Royal Navy eventually rising to the rank of surgeon rear-admiral. In 1975 he was appointed an Honorary Surgeon to the Queen.

== Ceramics collector ==
Pugh was a prolific collector of Staffordshire portrait figures and naval ceramics amassing a collection of over 5,000 pieces. in 1970 he loaned the collection to the Potteries Museum & Art Gallery in Stoke-on-Trent. This arrangement continued until 1980 when Pugh emigrated to South Africa and he offered to sell the collection to the museum. With the aid of grants, donations and an appeal fund the collection was purchased, and became known as The Pugh Collection of Victorian Staffordshire Figures. His book "Staffordshire Portrait Figures and Allied Subjects of the Victorian Era" became the standard work on the subject.

== Personal life ==
Pugh was the father of endurance swimmer and ocean advocate Lewis Pugh.

Pugh was a descendant of Baptist missionary William Carey. His cousin, Carey Heydenrych, participated in the "Great Escape" from the German POW camp Stalag Luft III during the Second World War.

P. D. Gordon Pugh died on 15 July 1993, at the age of 72.

== Writing ==
- P.D. Gordon Pugh. Nelson and his surgeons E. & S. Livingstone, Edinburgh, 1968
- P.D. Gordon Pugh. Naval Ceramics. The Ceramic Book Co., Newport, England, 1971.
- P.D. Gordon Pugh. The History of the Royal Naval Hospital, Plymouth. I. The life and times of Captain Richard Creyke. J R Nav Med Serv. 1972 Summer;58(2):78-94.
- P.D. Gordon Pugh. The History of the Royal Naval Hospital, Plymouth. II. 'A walk around the Hospital.' J R Nav Med Serv. 1972 Winter; 58(3):207-26.
