= Donnie MacLeod =

Canadian politician

MLA for Cape Breton East
- In office 1980–1988
- Preceded by: Jeremy Akerman
- Succeeded by: John MacEachern

Personal details
- Born: September 10, 1938 Glace Bay, Nova Scotia
- Died: June 22, 2015 (aged 76) Halifax, Nova Scotia
- Party: Progressive Conservative

Donald Gardner "Donnie" MacLeod (September 10, 1938 – June 22, 2015) was a Canadian politician. He represented the electoral district of Cape Breton East in the Nova Scotia House of Assembly from 1980 to 1988. He was a member of the Progressive Conservative Party of Nova Scotia.

Born in 1938 at Glace Bay, Nova Scotia, MacLeod was first elected in a byelection on December 2, 1980. MacLeod was re-elected in the 1981, and 1984 elections. He did not seek re-election in 1988.

MacLeod died on June 22, 2015.
