= Table Head =

Coordinates: 46°12′59.99″N 59°57′17.57″W

Table Head in Nova Scotia

Table Head is a Neighborhood in the Canadian province of Nova Scotia, located in Glace Bay in the Cape Breton Regional Municipality on Cape Breton Island.

== History ==
On December 15, 1902 Guglielmo Marconi established trans-Atlantic communication between Table Head in Glace Bay, Nova Scotia and Poldhu in Cornwall, England using a 60 kilowatt transmitter and four 210-foot (64 m) towers. The site of the Marconi Towers Station is now used to house a museum, the Marconi National Historic Site.
