= Renwick Brook Park =

Urban park in Glace Bay, Cape Breton Regional Municipality, Nova Scotia, Canada

- Location within Nova Scotia Location within Canada
- Type: Municipal Urban Park
- Location: Glace Bay, Cape Breton Island, Nova Scotia, Canada
- Nearest town: Cape Breton Regional Municipality
- Coordinates: 46°11′16″N 59°57′38″W
- Area: 10 hectares (25 acres)
- Created: 1983-1986
- Operator: Cape Breton Regional Municipality, Parks & Grounds
- Status: Operational
- Paths: Renwick Brook Trail
- Water: Renwick Brook
- Public transit: Transit Cape Breton Route 4
- Website: Recreation Facilities

Renwick Brook Park is an urban park located in the community of Glace Bay, part of the Cape Breton Regional Municipality in Nova Scotia, Canada. The park includes over 4 kilometres (2.5 mi) of walking trails spread through an area of over 10 hectares (25 acres), winding along a quiet brook. The park is adjacent to both the Cameron Bowl Ball Park and Queen Elizabeth Park, which all together make up a green space of more than 17 hectares (42 acres) in downtown Glace Bay.

== Park layout ==
Renwick Brook Park lies in a shallow valley containing a brook of the same name. The park has series of crushed limestone walking paths, the main trail looping between the foot bridge near where Commercial Street crosses the brook to a foot bridge near the intersection of Park and Brookside Streets. The trails also continue south under Park Street, past the Cameron Bowl Ball Park crossing two more foot bridges to end at Newsom Park at Dominion Street and also looping back north to the Cameron Bowl. The pathway between Commercial Street and Park Street is illuminated at night.

The Renwick Brook valley bisects the community of Glace Bay, neatly separating it into two districts with the Renwick Brook Park's foot bridges and paths interconnecting the two. The park features walking trails, benches, flower beds, path lighting, a small dam, and pedestrian bridges crossing the brook in several places and at either end. The area is home to several species of birds, particularly waterfowl.

== History ==
On 4 April 1970 Inglis H. Macaulay, a member of council and Deputy Mayor for Glace Bay, proposed a development along the Renwick Brook as part of a larger municipal infrastructure project then in the planning stages. The project was ready to proceed by 1973 but the high interest rates in place at the time put the project on hold. Finally construction began in 1983, spearheaded by then Mayor of Glace Bay Bruce Allan Clark and then MP David Dingwall. The project was completed by 1986.

== 2009 upgrade ==
In 2008-2009 Renwick Brook Park underwent a $560,000 upgrade which included improvements to the trails, landscaping, and replacement of all the path lighting. A lighthouse sculpture was installed to commemorate those who initiated and contributed to the development of the park in the 1980s. A re-dedication ceremony was held on 30 October 2009.
