= Glace Bay-Dominion =

Provincial electoral district in Nova Scotia, Canada

Coordinates: 46.200°N 59.967°W

Nova Scotia electoral district
- Glace Bay in relation to other Cape Breton electoral districts

Provincial electoral district
- Legislature: Nova Scotia House of Assembly
MLA
John White
Progressive Conservative
- District created: 1925
- First contested: 1928
- Last contested: 2024

Demographics
- Population (2011): 15,487
- Electors (2012): 12,236
- Area (km²): 29
- Pop. density (per km²): 534
- Census division: Cape Breton County
- Census subdivision: Cape Breton RM

Glace Bay-Dominion is a provincial electoral district in Nova Scotia, Canada, that elects one member of the Nova Scotia House of Assembly.

The Member of the Legislative Assembly since 2021 is John White of the Progressive Conservative Party of Nova Scotia.

It was created in 1925 when the district of Cape Breton was divided into five electoral districts, one of which was named Cape Breton East. In 2001, the district name was changed to Glace Bay. In 2003, the district lost a small area at its southern tip to Cape Breton West. Following the 2019 redistribution, it gained the Dominion area from Cape Breton Centre and was renamed Glace Bay-Dominion.

== Geography ==
The land area of Glace Bay-Dominion is 29 km^{2} (11 sq mi).

== Members of the Legislative Assembly ==
This riding has elected the following members of the Legislative Assembly:

Legislature	Years	Member	Party
Cape Breton East; Riding created from Cape Breton
40th	1933–1937	Lauchlin Currie	Liberal
41st	1937–1941	Lauchlin Currie	Liberal
40th	1941–1945	Douglas Neil Brodie	Co-operative Commonwealth
50th	1945–1949	Russell Cunningham	Co-operative Commonwealth
44th	1949–1953	Russell Cunningham	Co-operative Commonwealth
45th	1953–1956	Russell Cunningham	Co-operative Commonwealth
46th	1956–1960	Layton Fergusson	Progressive Conservative
47th	1960–1963	Layton Fergusson	Progressive Conservative
48th	1963–1967	Layton Fergusson	Progressive Conservative
49th	1967–1970	Layton Fergusson	Progressive Conservative
50th	1970–1974	Jeremy Akerman	New Democratic
51st	1974–1978	Jeremy Akerman	New Democratic
52nd	1978–1980	Jeremy Akerman	New Democratic
52nd	1980–1981	Donnie MacLeod	Progressive Conservative
53rd	1981–1984	Donnie MacLeod	Progressive Conservative
54th	1984–1988	Donnie MacLeod	Progressive Conservative
55th	1988–1993	John MacEachern	Liberal
56th	1993–1998	John MacEachern	Liberal
57th	1998–1998	Reeves Matheson	New Democratic
57th	1998–1999	Reeves Matheson	Independent
58th	1999–2003	Dave Wilson	Liberal
Glace Bay
59th	2003–2006	Dave Wilson	Liberal
60th	2006–2009	Dave Wilson	Liberal
61st	2009–2010	Dave Wilson	Liberal
61st	2010–2013	Geoff MacLellan	Liberal
62nd	2013–2017	Geoff MacLellan	Liberal
63rd	2017–2021	Geoff MacLellan	Liberal
Glace Bay-Dominion
64th	2021–2024	John White	Progressive Conservative
65th	2024–present	John White	Progressive Conservative

== Election results ==
=== 2024 ===
2024 Nova Scotia general election
Party	Candidate	Votes	%	±%
Progressive Conservative	John White	4,187	72.31	+37.71
Liberal	David Alexander MacLeod	1,009	17.43	-13.72
New Democratic	Kathy Chapman	594	10.26	-23.98
Total		5,790	–	
Total rejected ballots		57		
Turnout		5,847	43.79	
Eligible voters		13,353		
Progressive Conservative hold		Swing		
Source: Elections Nova Scotia

=== 2021 ===
2021 Nova Scotia general election
Party	Candidate	Votes	%	±%	Expenditures
Progressive Conservative	John White	2,754	34.61	-4.52	$37,763.63
New Democratic	John Morgan	2,725	34.24	+19.63	$55,096.40
Liberal	John John McCarthy	2,479	31.15	-13.44	$39,681.23
Total valid votes/expense limit		7,958	99.45	–	$79,292.15
Total rejected ballots		44	0.55		
Turnout		8,002	58.98		
Eligible voters		13,567			
Progressive Conservative gain from Liberal		Swing		+4.46	
Source: Elections Nova Scotia

=== 2017 ===
2017 provincial election redistributed results
Party	Vote	%
Liberal	3,641	44.59
Progressive Conservative	3,195	39.13
New Democratic	1,193	14.61
Atlantica	137	1.68

2017 Nova Scotia general election
Party	Candidate	Votes	%	±%
Liberal	Geoff MacLellan	3,317	46.65	-33.70
Progressive Conservative	John White	2,938	41.32	+36.18
New Democratic	Lois MacDougall	718	10.10	-4.40
Atlantica	Steven James MacNeil	137	1.93	–
Total valid votes		7,110	100	
Total rejected ballots		73	1.03	
Turnout		7,183	57.4	
Eligible voters		12,510		
Liberal hold		Swing		-34.96
Source: Elections Nova Scotia

=== 2013 ===
2013 Nova Scotia general election: Glace Bay
Party	Candidate	Votes	%	±%
Liberal	Geoff MacLellan	5,547	80.36%	26.09%
New Democratic	Mary Beth MacDonald	1,001	14.50%	-17.18%
Progressive Conservative	Thomas J. W. Bethell	355	5.14%	-5.42%
Total		6,903	–	
Source(s) Source: Nova Scotia Legislature (2024). "Electoral History for Glace Bay" (PDF). nslegislature.ca. Nova Scotia, Chief Electoral Officer (2013). 39th Provincial General Election, October 8, 2013: Volume 1 – Statement of Votes & Statistics (PDF) (Report). Elections Nova Scotia. Archived from the original (PDF) on 10 April 2018.

=== 2010 by-election ===
Nova Scotia provincial by-election, 2010-10-08: Glace Bay
Party	Candidate	Votes	%	±%
Liberal	Geoff MacLellan	3,901	54.27%	6.67%
New Democratic	Myrtle T. Campbell	2,277	31.68%	-8.16%
Progressive Conservative	Michelle Wheelhouse	759	10.56%	-0.85%
Independent	Edna Lee	195	2.71%	–
Atlantica	Dan Wilson	56	0.78%	–
Total		7,188	–	
Source(s) Source: Nova Scotia Legislature (2024). "Electoral History for Glace Bay" (PDF). nslegislature.ca.

=== 2009 ===
2009 Nova Scotia general election: Glace Bay
Party	Candidate	Votes	%	±%
Liberal	Dave Wilson	3,380	47.60%	4.52%
New Democratic	Myrtle T. Campbell	2,829	39.84%	10.91%
Progressive Conservative	Tom MacPherson	810	11.41%	-15.45%
Green	Todd Pettigrew	82	1.15%	0.02%
Total		7,101	–	
Source(s) Source: Nova Scotia Legislature (2024). "Electoral History for Glace Bay" (PDF). nslegislature.ca.

=== 2006 ===
2006 Nova Scotia general election: Glace Bay
Party	Candidate	Votes	%	±%
Liberal	Dave Wilson	3,327	43.08%	-11.40%
New Democratic	Myrtle T. Campbell	2,234	28.93%	0.06%
Progressive Conservative	Mark Bettens	2,074	26.85%	10.20%
Green	Todd Pettigrew	88	1.14%	–
Total		7,723	–	
Source(s) Source: Nova Scotia Legislature (2024). "Electoral History for Glace Bay" (PDF). nslegislature.ca.

=== 2003 ===
2003 Nova Scotia general election: Glace Bay
Party	Candidate	Votes	%	±%
Liberal	Dave Wilson	4,420	54.48%	14.36%
New Democratic	Vince Hall	2,342	28.87%	-11.20%
Progressive Conservative	Mark Bettens	1,351	16.65%	5.36%
Total		8,113	–	
Source(s) Source: Nova Scotia Legislature (2024). "Electoral History for Glace Bay" (PDF). nslegislature.ca.

=== 2000 by-election ===
Nova Scotia provincial by-election, 2000-04-04: Cape Breton East
Party	Candidate	Votes	%	±%
Liberal	Dave Wilson	4,017	43.33%	3.22%
New Democratic	Cecil Saccary	3,609	38.93%	-1.13%
Progressive Conservative	Brad Kerr	1,644	17.73%	6.44%
Total		9,270	–	
Source(s) Source: Nova Scotia Legislature (2024). "Electoral History for Cape Breton East" (PDF). nslegislature.ca.

=== 1999 ===
1999 Nova Scotia general election: Cape Breton East
Party	Candidate	Votes	%	±%
Liberal	Dave Wilson	3,704	40.12%	10.06%
New Democratic	Cecil Saccary	3,699	40.06%	-12.52%
Progressive Conservative	Brad Kerr	1,043	11.30%	-6.06%
Independent	Gerard Burke	787	8.52%	–
Total		9,233	–	
Source(s) Source: Nova Scotia Legislature (2024). "Electoral History for Cape Breton East" (PDF). nslegislature.ca. Nova Scotia, Chief Electoral Officer (1999). Returns of the General Election for the House of Assembly, Thirty-Fifth General Election (Report). Elections Nova Scotia.

=== 1998 ===
1998 Nova Scotia general election: Cape Breton East
Party	Candidate	Votes	%	±%
New Democratic	Reeves Matheson	5,002	52.59%	36.47%
Liberal	Clarence Routledge	2,859	30.06%	-43.44%
Progressive Conservative	Henry Boutlier	1,651	17.36%	6.97%
Total		9,512	–	
Source(s) Source: Nova Scotia Legislature (2024). "Electoral History for Cape Breton East" (PDF). nslegislature.ca.

=== 1993 ===
1993 Nova Scotia general election: Cape Breton East
Party	Candidate	Votes	%	±%
Liberal	John MacEachern	7,566	73.50%	22.90%
New Democratic	Terry McVarish	1,659	16.12%	2.10%
Progressive Conservative	Greg Hicks	1,069	10.38%	-25.00%
Total		10,294	–	
Source(s) Source: Nova Scotia Legislature (2024). "Electoral History for Cape Breton East" (PDF). nslegislature.ca. Nova Scotia, Chief Electoral Officer (1993). Returns of the General Election for the House of Assembly, Thirty-Third General Election (PDF) (Report). Queen's Printer. Archived from the original (PDF) on 18 June 2018.

=== 1988 ===
1988 Nova Scotia general election: Cape Breton East
Party	Candidate	Votes	%	±%
Liberal	John MacEachern	5,739	50.60%	16.97%
Progressive Conservative	Bruce Clark	4,014	35.39%	-9.58%
New Democratic	Terry McVarish	1,590	14.02%	8.80%
Total		11,343	–	
Source(s) Source: Nova Scotia Legislature (2024). "Electoral History for Cape Breton East" (PDF). nslegislature.ca. Nova Scotia, Chief Electoral Officer (1988). Returns of the General Election for the House of Assembly, Thirty-Second General Election (PDF) (Report). Queen's Printer. Archived from the original (PDF) on 7 July 2018.

=== 1984 ===
1984 Nova Scotia general election: Cape Breton East
Party	Candidate	Votes	%	±%
Progressive Conservative	Donnie MacLeod	4,787	44.97%	-0.58%
Liberal	Cha Keliher	3,579	33.62%	4.03%
Labour	Michael Blais Matheson	1,724	16.20%	–
New Democratic	Jim Jobe	555	5.21%	-12.71%
Total		10,645	–	
Source(s) Source: Nova Scotia Legislature (2024). "Electoral History for Cape Breton East" (PDF). nslegislature.ca. Nova Scotia, Chief Electoral Officer (1984). Returns of the General Election for the House of Assembly, Thirty-First General Election (PDF) (Report). Queen's Printer. Archived from the original (PDF) on 31 July 2017.

=== 1981 ===
1981 Nova Scotia general election: Cape Breton East
Party	Candidate	Votes	%	±%
Progressive Conservative	Donnie MacLeod	4,699	45.55%	2.67%
Liberal	Shelly McNeil	3,053	29.59%	1.95%
New Democratic	Joe Kanary	1,849	17.92%	-10.60%
Independent	Blair Matheson	716	6.94%	–
Total		10,317	–	
Source(s) Source: Nova Scotia Legislature (2024). "Electoral History for Cape Breton East" (PDF). nslegislature.ca. Nova Scotia, Chief Electoral Officer (1981). Returns of the General Election for the House of Assembly, Thirtieth General Election (PDF) (Report). Queen's Printer. Archived from the original (PDF) on 31 July 2017.

=== 1980 ===
Nova Scotia provincial by-election, 1980-12-02: Cape Breton East
Party	Candidate	Votes	%	±%
Progressive Conservative	Donnie MacLeod	4,505	42.88%	15.03%
New Democratic	Reeves Matheson	2,996	28.52%	-16.42%
Liberal	Vince Kachafanas	2,904	27.64%	0.43%
Independent	Ignatius V. Kennedy	101	0.96%	–
Total		10,506	–	
Source(s) Source: Nova Scotia Legislature (2024). "Electoral History for Cape Breton East" (PDF). nslegislature.ca.

=== 1978 ===
1978 Nova Scotia general election: Cape Breton East
Party	Candidate	Votes	%	±%
New Democratic	Jeremy Akerman	5,135	44.94%	-8.16%
Progressive Conservative	Frank Edwards	3,182	27.85%	13.42%
Liberal	Vincent Kachafanas	3,109	27.21%	-3.62%
Total		11,426	–	
Source(s) Source: Nova Scotia Legislature (2024). "Electoral History for Cape Breton East" (PDF). nslegislature.ca. Nova Scotia, Chief Electoral Officer (1978). Returns of the General Election for the House of Assembly, Twenty-Ninth General Election (PDF) (Report). Queen's Printer. Archived from the original (PDF) on 18 June 2018.

=== 1974 ===
1974 Nova Scotia general election: Cape Breton East
Party	Candidate	Votes	%	±%
New Democratic	Jeremy Akerman	5,929	53.10%	5.38%
Liberal	Vincent Kachafanas	3,443	30.83%	12.61%
Progressive Conservative	Frederick Adshade	1,611	14.43%	-19.63%
Independent	Archie MacDonald	183	1.64%	–
Total		11,166	–	
Source(s) Source: Nova Scotia Legislature (2024). "Electoral History for Cape Breton East" (PDF). nslegislature.ca. Nova Scotia, Chief Electoral Officer (1974). Returns of the General Election for the House of Assembly, Twenty-Eighth General Election (PDF) (Report). Queen's Printer. Archived from the original (PDF) on 18 June 2018.

=== 1970 ===
1970 Nova Scotia general election: Cape Breton East
Party	Candidate	Votes	%	±%
New Democratic	Jeremy Akerman	5,334	47.72%	15.83%
Progressive Conservative	Layton Fergusson	3,807	34.06%	-19.23%
Liberal	Robert MacKay	2,037	18.22%	3.40%
Total		11,178	–	
Source(s) Source: Nova Scotia Legislature (2024). "Electoral History for Cape Breton East" (PDF). nslegislature.ca. Nova Scotia, Legislative Assembly (1970). Returns of the General Election for the House of Assembly, 1970 (PDF) (Report). Queen's Printer. Archived from the original (PDF) on 25 July 2018.

=== 1967 ===
1967 Nova Scotia general election: Cape Breton East
Party	Candidate	Votes	%	±%
Progressive Conservative	Layton Fergusson	5,094	53.29%	-4.77%
New Democratic	James H. Aitchison	3,048	31.89%	3.39%
Liberal	William O'Leary	1,417	14.82%	1.38%
Total		9,559	–	
Source(s) Source: Nova Scotia Legislature (2024). "Electoral History for Cape Breton East" (PDF). nslegislature.ca. Nova Scotia Legislature (1967). Returns of the General Election for the House of Assembly (PDF) (Report). Queen's Printer. Archived from the original (PDF) on 25 July 2018.

=== 1963 ===
1963 Nova Scotia general election: Cape Breton East
Party	Candidate	Votes	%	±%
Progressive Conservative	Layton Fergusson	5,870	58.06%	12.50%
New Democratic	John L. MacKinnon	2,881	28.50%	-11.26%
Liberal	Bernard Currie	1,359	13.44%	-1.24%
Total		10,110	–	
Source(s) Source: Nova Scotia Legislature (2024). "Electoral History for Cape Breton East" (PDF). nslegislature.ca. Nova Scotia Legislature (1963). Returns of the General Election for the House of Assembly (PDF) (Report). Queen's Printer. Archived from the original (PDF) on 25 July 2018.

=== 1960 ===
1960 Nova Scotia general election: Cape Breton East
Party	Candidate	Votes	%	±%
Progressive Conservative	Layton Fergusson	4,862	45.56%	3.36%
Co-operative Commonwealth	John L. MacKinnon	4,243	39.76%	11.81%
Liberal	Joe A. Wadden	1,567	14.68%	-15.16%
Total		10,672	–	
Source(s) Source: Nova Scotia Legislature (2024). "Electoral History for Cape Breton East" (PDF). nslegislature.ca. Nova Scotia Legislature (1960). Returns of the General Election for the House of Assembly (PDF) (Report). Queen's Printer. Archived from the original (PDF) on 25 July 2018.

=== 1956 ===
1956 Nova Scotia general election: Cape Breton East
Party	Candidate	Votes	%	±%
Progressive Conservative	Layton Fergusson	4,324	42.20%	29.15%
Liberal	Charles Roy MacDonald	3,058	29.85%	-8.03%
Co-operative Commonwealth	Russell Cunningham	2,864	27.95%	-21.11%
Total		10,246	–	
Source(s) Source: Nova Scotia Legislature (2024). "Electoral History for Cape Breton East" (PDF). nslegislature.ca. Nova Scotia Legislature (1956). Returns of the General Election for the House of Assembly (PDF) (Report). Queen's Printer. Archived from the original (PDF) on 10 September 2018.

=== 1953 ===
1953 Nova Scotia general election: Cape Breton East
Party	Candidate	Votes	%	±%
Co-operative Commonwealth	Russell Cunningham	5,096	49.07%	5.65%
Liberal	Joseph McIntyre	3,934	37.88%	1.29%
Progressive Conservative	William Wilton	1,356	13.06%	-6.94%
Total		10,386	–	
Source(s) Source: Nova Scotia Legislature (2024). "Electoral History for Cape Breton East" (PDF). nslegislature.ca. Nova Scotia Legislature (1953). Returns of the General Election for the House of Assembly (PDF) (Report). Queen's Printer. Archived from the original (PDF) on 10 September 2018.

=== 1949 ===
1949 Nova Scotia general election: Cape Breton East
Party	Candidate	Votes	%	±%
Co-operative Commonwealth	Russell Cunningham	4,543	43.41%	-15.49%
Liberal	Charles Roy MacDonald	3,829	36.59%	6.55%
Progressive Conservative	Thomas Horace Dickson	2,093	20.00%	8.93%
Total		10,465	–	
Source(s) Source: Nova Scotia Legislature (2024). "Electoral History for Cape Breton East" (PDF). nslegislature.ca. Nova Scotia Legislature (1949). Returns of the General Election for the House of Assembly (PDF) (Report). Queen's Printer. Archived from the original (PDF) on 10 September 2018.

=== 1945 ===
1945 Nova Scotia general election: Cape Breton East
Party	Candidate	Votes	%	±%
Co-operative Commonwealth	Russell Cunningham	5,332	58.90%	-1.66%
Liberal	Gus McGillivray	2,719	30.03%	-9.41%
Progressive Conservative	Kenneth Beaton	1,002	11.07%	–
Total		9,053	–	
Source(s) Source: Nova Scotia Legislature (2024). "Electoral History for Cape Breton East" (PDF). nslegislature.ca. Nova Scotia Legislature (1945). Returns of the General Election for the House of Assembly (PDF) (Report). Queen's Printer. Archived from the original (PDF) on 10 September 2018.

=== 1941 ===
1941 Nova Scotia general election: Cape Breton East
Party	Candidate	Votes	%	±%
Co-operative Commonwealth	Douglas Neil Brodie	6,222	60.56%	–
Liberal	Lauchlin Daniel Currie	4,052	39.44%	-0.68%
Total		10,274	–	
Source(s) Source: Nova Scotia Legislature (2024). "Electoral History for Cape Breton East" (PDF). nslegislature.ca. Nova Scotia Legislature (1941). Returns of the General Election for the House of Assembly (PDF) (Report). Queen's Printer. Archived from the original (PDF) on 8 February 2024.

=== 1937 ===
1937 Nova Scotia general election: Cape Breton East
Party	Candidate	Votes	%	±%
Liberal	Lauchlin Daniel Currie	4,172	40.12%	0.90%
Labour	William T. Mercer	3,396	32.65%	–
Progressive Conservative	Roderick Kerr	2,832	27.23%	–
Total		10,400	–	
Source(s) Source: Nova Scotia Legislature (2024). "Electoral History for Cape Breton East" (PDF). nslegislature.ca. Nova Scotia Legislature (1937). Returns of the General Election for the House of Assembly (PDF) (Report). Queen's Printer. Archived from the original (PDF) on 1 March 2019.

=== 1933 ===
1933 Nova Scotia general election: Cape Breton East
Party	Candidate	Votes	%	±%
Liberal	Lauchlin Daniel Currie	3,655	39.21%	2.55%
Liberal-Conservative	Daniel R. Cameron	3,632	38.97%	-5.09%
United Front	J. B. McLachlan	1,737	18.64%	–
Co-operative Commonwealth	Donald O. Fraser	297	3.19%	–
Total		9,321	–	
Source(s) Source: Nova Scotia Legislature (2024). "Electoral History for Cape Breton East" (PDF). nslegislature.ca. Nova Scotia Legislature (1933). Returns of the General Election for the House of Assembly (PDF) (Report). Queen's Printer. Archived from the original (PDF) on 1 March 2019.

=== 1928 ===
1928 Nova Scotia general election: Cape Breton East
Party	Candidate	Votes	%	Elected
Liberal-Conservative	Robert Hamilton Butts	5,568	22.08%	✓
Liberal-Conservative	Daniel R. Cameron	5,541	21.98%	✓
Liberal	Lauchlin Daniel Currie	4,724	18.73%	
Liberal	Dan C. McDonald	4,520	17.93%	
Labour	J. B. McLachlan	2,589	10.27%	
Labour	Forman Waye	2,273	9.01%	
Total		25,215	–	
Source(s) Source: Nova Scotia Legislature (2024). "Electoral History for Cape Breton East" (PDF). nslegislature.ca.

=== 1925 by-election ===
Nova Scotia provincial by-election, 1925-08-01: Cape Breton East
Party	Candidate	Votes	%	Elected
Liberal-Conservative	John Carey Douglas	acclaimed	N/A	✓
Total			–	
Source(s) Source: Nova Scotia Legislature (2024). "Electoral History for Cape Breton East" (PDF). nslegislature.ca.

=== 1925 ===
1925 Nova Scotia general election: Cape Breton East
Party	Candidate	Votes	%	Elected
Liberal-Conservative	John Carey Douglas	7,276	29.77%	✓
Liberal-Conservative	Alexander O'Handley	7,071	28.93%	✓
Labour	D. W. Morrison	4,185	17.12%	
Labour	Forman Waye	4,051	16.57%	
Liberal	Dan C. McDonald	933	3.82%	
Liberal	James L. McKinnon	928	3.80%	
Total		24,444	–	
Source(s) Source: Nova Scotia Legislature (2024). "Electoral History for Cape Breton East" (PDF). nslegislature.ca.

== See also ==
- List of Nova Scotia provincial electoral districts
- Canadian provincial electoral districts
