= Marconi and Marconi Wireless Station National Historic Sites =

Two National Historic Sites in Cape Breton Island, Canada

Coordinates: 46°12′41.26″N 59°57′9.19″W

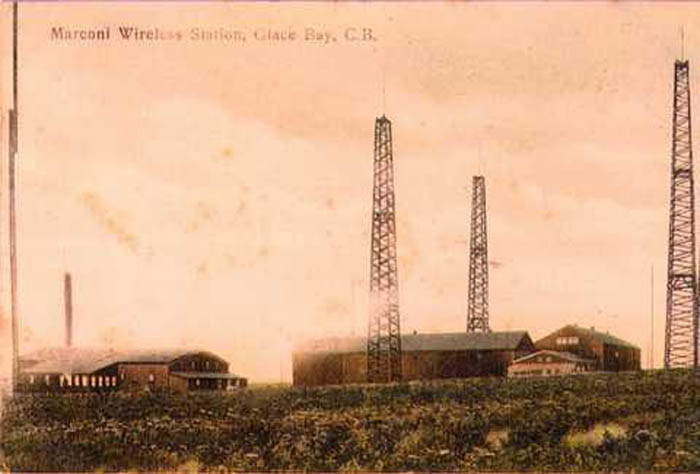
- An old postcard of the radio towers at the Marconi Wireless Station
- Location: In and near Glace Bay, Nova Scotia, Canada
- Type: National Historic Site of Canada
- Website: parks.canada.ca/lhn-nhs/ns/marconi

National Historic Site of Canada
- Official name: Marconi National Historic Site of Canada
- Designated: 1939

National Historic Site of Canada
- Official name: Marconi Wireless Station National Historic Site of Canada
- Designated: 1983

The Marconi National Historic Site and the Marconi Wireless Station National Historic Site are two National Historic Sites located on Cape Breton Island, Nova Scotia. Both sites commemorate the efforts of Guglielmo Marconi to transmit transatlantic radio signals between North America and Europe in the first decade of the 20th century. The two sites are located within approximately 8 kilometres (5.0 mi) of one another, and are connected by the Marconi Trail.

Signal Hill in St. John's, Newfoundland and Labrador is another National Historic Site related to Marconi's work in Canada. Signal Hill was designated, in part, to commemorate Marconi's first transmission tests in 1901.

== Marconi National Historic Site ==
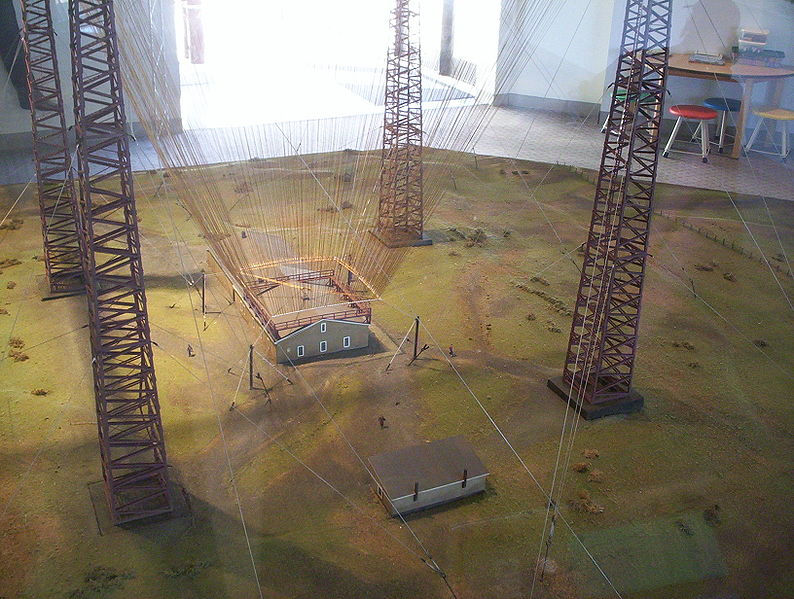
A model of Marconi's transmission towers at his first wireless station in Glace Bay

Marconi National Historic Site, located at Table Head in Glace Bay, is the site of Guglielmo Marconi's first transatlantic wireless station, callsign VAS, and the first wireless message sent from North America to Europe on December 15, 1902. The site features the remnants of Marconi's transmission towers, a modern amateur radio station, plus a museum chronicling Marconi's achievements.

Marconi chose this site for its elevated flat expanse and unobstructed view out over the Atlantic Ocean. Some of the concrete footings for the massive towers can still be seen on the grounds. In 1901, the first east to west wireless message was sent across the Atlantic Ocean to England from this site. A spark gap transmitter with 75 kilowatts of power fed four tall antennas on the 2-hectare (4.9-acre) site overlooking the ocean. In December 1902 Marconi transmitted the first complete messages to Poldhu from stations at Glace Bay, Nova Scotia.

Marconi's facilities were dismantled and moved to a larger site to the southwest in 1905, known today as the Marconi Wireless Station National Historic Site.

The first Glace Bay site was designated a National Historic Site in 1939. The site a unit of the national park system, operated by Parks Canada, and the museum at the Marconi National Historic Site is affiliated with CMA, CHIN, and Virtual Museum of Canada.

== Marconi Wireless Station National Historic Site ==
Communications between Glace Bay and England proved to be unreliable, and only possible after dark, so Marconi had larger stations constructed on both sides of the Atlantic between 1905 and 1907. These stations were at Clifden, Ireland, and a 350-hectare (860-acre) site just south of Glace Bay, near Port Morien. The two stations were at the time the most powerful radio stations in the world.

The Marconi Wireless Station in Cape Breton ceased operations in 1946. The property was bought by Russell Cunningham, a local resident, and it is still owned by his heirs. All that remains of the station today is the foundations of the aerial towers as well as three abandoned buildings in varying degrees of repair. The site was designated a National Historic Site in 1983. It is not a unit of the national park system, and public access is only by permission of the owners. A federal plaque from the national Historic Sites & Monuments Board reflecting the designation is located at the Old Town Hall & Glace Bay Heritage Museum, 14 McKeen Street, in Glace Bay.
