= Layton Fergusson =

Canadian politician (1908–1994)

N. Layton Fergusson

MLA for Cape Breton East
- In office 1956–1970
- Preceded by: Russell Cunningham
- Succeeded by: Jeremy Akerman

Personal details
- Born: September 5, 1908 Port Morien, Nova Scotia
- Died: February 27, 1994 (aged 85) Windsor, Nova Scotia
- Party: Progressive Conservative
- Occupation: Lawyer

Neil Layton Fergusson (September 5, 1908 – February 27, 1994) was a Canadian politician. He represented the electoral district of Cape Breton East in the Nova Scotia House of Assembly from 1956 to 1970. He was a member of the Nova Scotia Progressive Conservative Party.

Fergusson was born in Port Morien, Nova Scotia. He attended Dalhousie University and McGill University and was a lawyer. He married Grace Avery in 1945. He served in the Executive Council of Nova Scotia as Minister without portfolio, Minister of Municipal Affairs and Minister of Labour. He died in 1994.
