= Morrison Glace Bay High School =

Former high school in Nova Scotia, Canada

Coordinates: 46.18901°N 59.97906°W

Morrison Glace Bay High School was one of the two high schools serving the town of Glace Bay, Nova Scotia, Canada, during the latter half of the twentieth century. Morrison was operational as a high school between 1947 and 1989. The school colours were brown and gold and the yearbook was known as the Brown and Gold Annual.

== Origins ==
The school opened in September 1947, replacing the old Glace Bay High School across the street. The old Glace Bay High was converted to house junior high students and operated until it was demolished in 1976 when Morrison High was expanded via the building of an annex. The school was named after the then Mayor of Glace Bay, Dan Willie Morrison, who played a large role in the founding of the new facility.

The student body over the years was made of up students from Glace Bay, Dominion, Reserve Mines, Donkin, Port Morien and some of the other surrounding areas.

== Major expansions ==
In August 1964 a gymnasium was built on the site of the old outdoor ice rink.

In 1976 a new annex was completed which linked the high school on one side of McLean Street with the gymnasium on the other. The street now bisected by the new annex became a dead end on one side with the part now surrounded by the school becoming a pedestrian courtyard. In addition to joining the school and the gym, the new annex relieved overcrowding by providing additional classrooms, two science labs, a larger library, a typing lab and a music room. The former Glace Bay High School building which had been used for junior high classes since Morrison was founded in 1947 was demolished and the site used for parking.

== Years of operation ==
Morrison Glace Bay High School operated continuously from 1947 until 1989 when the new Glace Bay High School opened. After this date Morrison High operated as a Junior High school and was renamed Morrison Junior High. It closed in 2010, with the construction of Ocean View Education Centre.

On July 10, 2025, the majority of the building was burned down.

== Principals ==
1947 – 1952 Dr. Georgina "Georgie" MacKay

1952 – 1971 Dr. Donald M. Fergusson

1971 – 1985 Howard H. MacKinnon

1985 – 1989 Evan M. Kennedy
