= Cape Breton Miners Museum =

Coal Mining Museum in Nova Scotia, Canada

Coordinates: 46.1930°N 59.9419°W

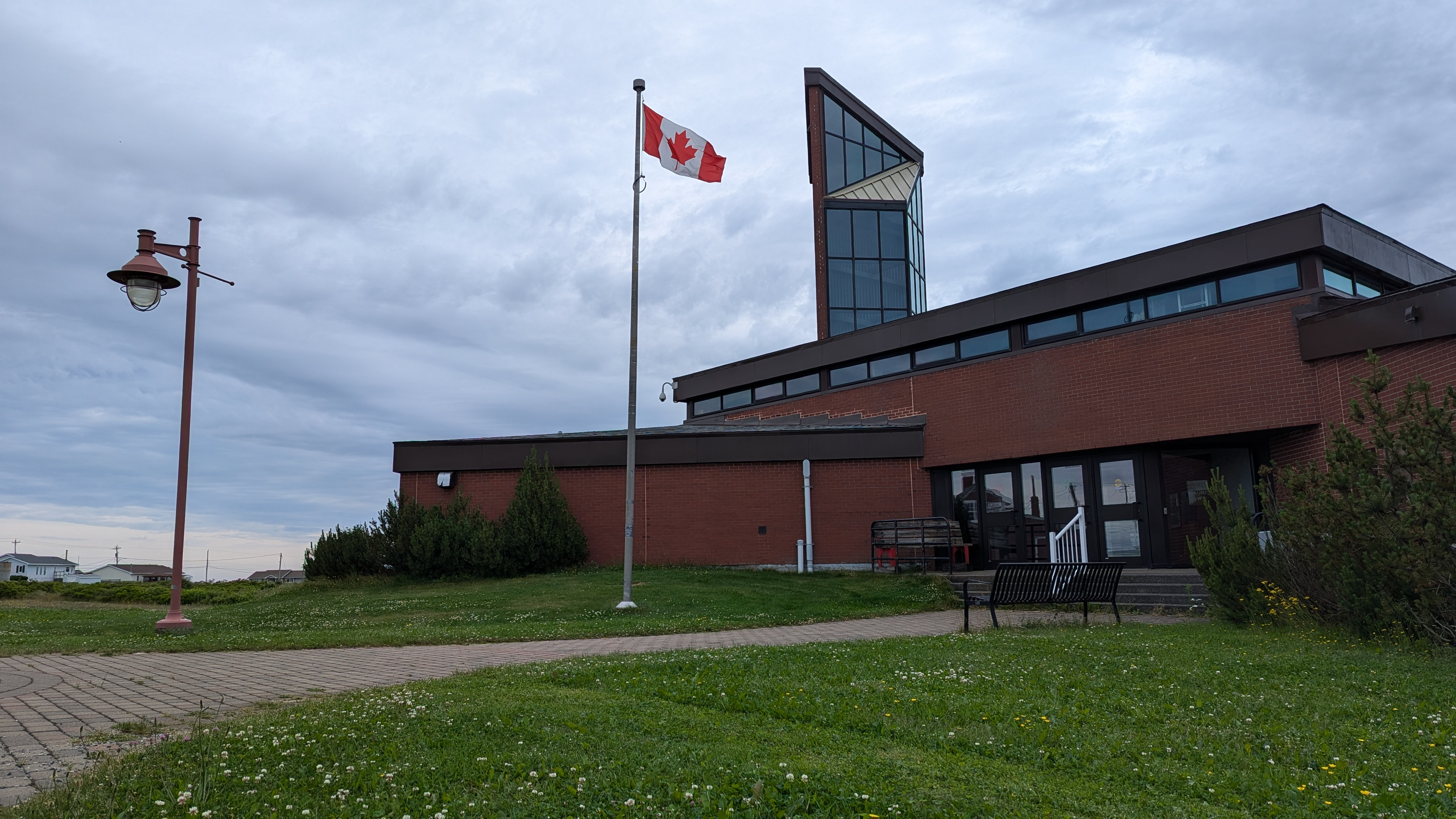
- Established: July 1, 1967
- Location: 17 Museum Street Glace Bay, Nova Scotia, Canada.
- Type: Community Heritage Museum
- Founder: Nina Cohen
- Executive director: Mary-Pat Mombourquette
- Chairperson: James Kerr
- Website: minersmuseum.com

The Cape Breton Miners Museum is a Canadian museum located in Glace Bay, Nova Scotia about 1km from downtown Glace Bay. The goal of the museum is "to enhance the knowledge, understanding, and appreciation of the events, experiences, and people associated with Cape Breton's mining industry; how it shapes our history, our identity, and connects us to the world and its diverse cultures." The museum was founded by Nina Cohen.

The main building of the museum contains an exhibit area dedicated to the history of coal mining in Cape Breton. Underneath the museum is the Ocean Deeps Colliery which is a coal mine that visitors can tour with retired miners as guides. As part of the guided tour visitors experience a mine simulator that virtually transports visitors to the No. 24 colliery.

Located outside the museum is The Miners Village. The Village consists of a Company House, a Company Store, a Pony Barn (not opened to the public), and the Miners Village Restaurant. The village buildings are staffed by volunteers and opened during the tourism season.

The museum is home to the Men of the Deeps who perform in the Men of the Deeps Theatre located inside the museum.

== See also ==
- List of museums in Nova Scotia
