= Lewis Pugh =

English endurance swimmer

Lewis Pugh OIG
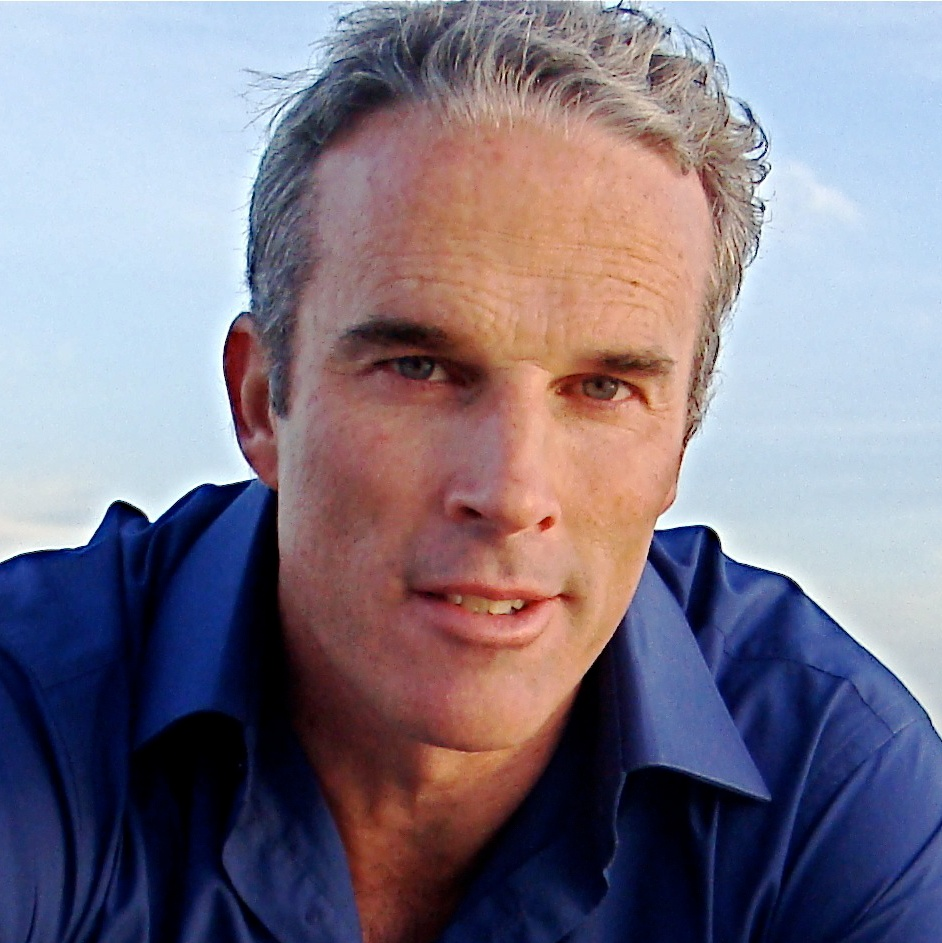
- Lewis Pugh
- Born: Plymouth, England
- Citizenship: United Kingdom, South Africa
- Education: Jesus College, Cambridge University of Cape Town
- Occupations: Endurance swimmer and Ocean advocate
- Parent(s): P.D. Gordon Pugh and Margery Pugh
- Honours: Order of Ikhamanga (Gold Class) 2009; Doctor of Science 2015; Mungo Park Medal 2019
- Website: www.lewispugh.com/home

Lewis William Gordon Pugh is a British-South African endurance swimmer and ocean advocate. He is the first person to complete a long-distance swim in every ocean of the world, and he frequently swims in vulnerable ecosystems to draw attention to their plight. His endurance swims have included swims in a glacial lake on Mount Everest, swimming the entire lengths of the English Channel and the River Thames, swimming across the North Pole, and swimming around the island of Martha's Vineyard off the eastern US coast. HIs latest swim, in November 2026, was in the Strait of Hormuz, to highlight the damage caused by the 2026 Iran war. He also undertakes campaigning and public speaking on environmental issues.

== Early life and education ==
Lewis William Gordon Pugh was born in Plymouth, England.

His father, P.D. Gordon Pugh, was a surgeon in the Royal Navy, an author, and a prolific collector of ceramics of the Victorian era. His mother, Margery Pugh, was a Senior Nursing Sister in Queen Alexandra's Royal Naval Nursing Service. Pugh grew up on the edge of Dartmoor in Devon.

He was educated at Mount House School in Tavistock. When he was 10 years old his family emigrated to South Africa. He continued his schooling at St Andrew's College in Grahamstown and later at Camps Bay High School in Cape Town.

He went on to study politics and law at the University of Cape Town, graduating at the top of his Masters class.

In his mid-twenties he returned to England, where he studied international law at Jesus College, Cambridge.

== Early career ==
Pugh worked as a maritime lawyer at Ince & Co in the City of London for a decade. During this time he concurrently served as a Reservist in the British Special Air Service.

== Swimming ==
Pugh is known for undertaking the first swim across the North Pole in 2007 with the aim of highlighting the melting of the Arctic sea ice. In 2010, he swam across a glacial lake on Mount Everest to draw attention to the melting of the glaciers in the Himalayas and the impact the reduced water supply would have on peace in the region. In 2018 he swam the full length of the English Channel to call for 30% of the world's oceans to be protected by 2030.

he is the first person to complete a long-distance swim in every ocean of the world, and he frequently swims in vulnerable ecosystems to draw attention to their plight.

Over a period of 30 years Pugh has pioneered more swims around famous landmarks than any other swimmer in history. In an interview with Forbes he stated:

"Between Lynne Cox, Martin Strel and myself, we've hit all of the world's major landmarks. There's really nothing left."

In 2013 he was inducted into the International Marathon Swimming Hall of Fame.

=== Early swims ===
Pugh had his first real swimming lesson in 1986, at the age of 17. One month later he swam from Robben Island (where Nelson Mandela was imprisoned) to Cape Town. In 1992 he swam across the English Channel. In 2002 he broke the record for the fastest time for swimming around Robben Island.

He was the first person to swim around Cape Agulhas (the southernmost point in Africa), the Cape of Good Hope, and the Cape Peninsula (a 100 km (62 mi) swim from Cape Town to Muizenberg). Pugh was also the first person to swim across an African Great Lake, namely Lake Malawi.

=== Cold water swims ===
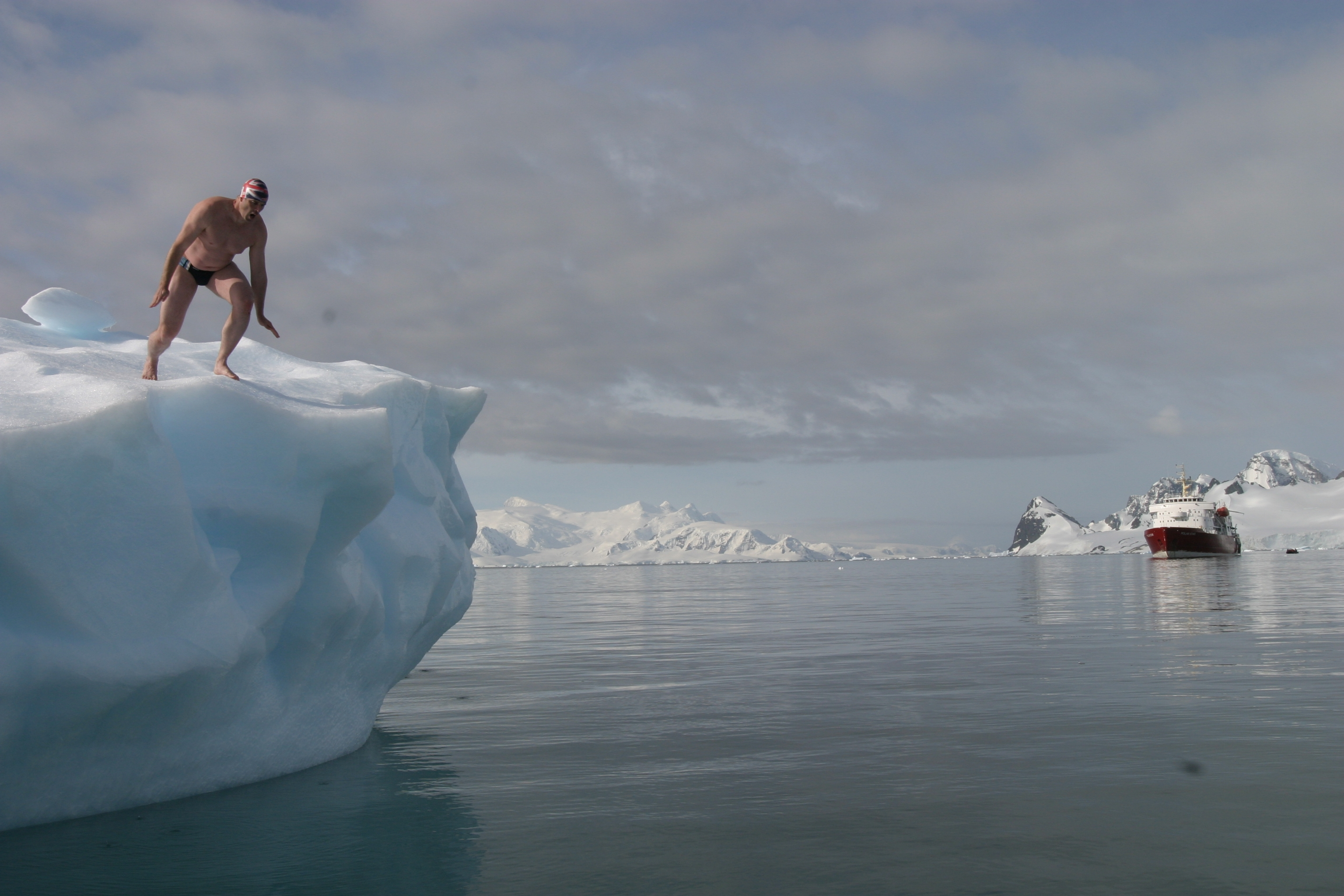
Pugh training in Antarctica in 2005

After 2003 Pugh focused on pioneering swims in the coldest and most hostile waters of the world. All of them were undertaken in accordance with Channel Swimming Association rules, in just a pair of Speedo swimming trunks, cap and goggles. He became the first person to swim around the infamous North Cape, the northernmost point in Europe. The following year he became the first person to swim down the entire length of Sognefjord in Norway, a 204 km (127 mi) swim which took him 21 days to complete.

In 2005 he broke the world record for the farthest-north long-distance swim by undertaking a 1 km (0.62 mi) swim at 80° North around Verlegenhuken, the northernmost cape in Spitsbergen. He followed that five months later by breaking Lynne Cox's world record for the farthest-south long-distance swim by undertaking a 1 km (0.62 mi) swim at 65° South at Petermann Island off the Antarctic Peninsula.

In November 2017, Pugh became be the first person to swim in the Antarctic waters around South Georgia Island.

=== Anticipatory Thermo-Genesis ===
On both his Arctic and Antarctic expeditions Professor Tim Noakes, a sports scientist from the University of Cape Town, recorded Pugh's ability to raise his core body temperature by nearly 2 °C in anticipation of entering the freezing water. He coined the phrase "anticipatory thermo-genesis" (the creation of heat before an event). This phenomenon had not been noted in any other human. Noakes argues it is a Pavlovian response to years of cold-water swimming, while Pugh believes it is a response to fear.

=== World Winter Swimming Championships ===
In 2006 Pugh challenged Russia's top cold-water swimmers to a 500-metre race at the World Winter Swimming Championships in Finland. He won the gold medal, beating Russian Champion Alexander Brylin by over 100 metres and the bronze medalist Nefatov Vladimir by 125 metres.

=== "Holy Grail" of swimming ===
In 2006 Pugh achieved the "Holy Grail" of swimming by becoming the first person to complete a long-distance swim in all five oceans of the world. His five swims were :

- Atlantic Ocean – across the English Channel in 1992
- Arctic Ocean – around the most northern point of the Island of Spitsbergen in 2005
- Southern Ocean – across Whaler's Bay in Deception Island in 2005
- Indian Ocean – across Nelson Mandela Bay in 2006
- Pacific Ocean – from Manly Beach through the Sydney Heads to the Sydney Opera House in 2006

=== Environmental swims ===
==== River Thames ====
In 2006, he became the first person to swim the entire length of the River Thames. He undertook the swim to draw attention to the severe drought in England and the dangers of global warming. The 325 km (202 mi) swim took him 21 days to complete. The upper stretch of the river had stopped flowing due to the drought, forcing Pugh to run the first 42 km (26 mi) of the river.

While swimming through London, Pugh exited the water and made a visit to Tony Blair at 10 Downing Street to call on the United Kingdom to move towards a low carbon economy. Shortly afterwards the Prime Minister introduced the Climate Change Bill to Parliament.

==== Maldives ====
In February 2007 Pugh became the first person to swim across the width of the Maldives. He undertook the swim to raise awareness about the effect of climate change on low-lying islands in the world. The 140 km (87 mi) swim took 10 days to complete.

==== North Pole ====
In July 2007 Pugh undertook the first long-distance swim across the Geographic North Pole. The 1 km (0.62 mi) swim, across an open patch of sea, in minus 1.7 °C (29 °F) water, took 18 minutes and 50 seconds to complete. Jørgen Amundsen, the great-grandnephew of Norwegian explorer Roald Amundsen, paced Pugh by skiing alongside him during the swim.

The swim coincided with the lowest coverage of Arctic sea ice ever recorded.

==== Mount Everest ====
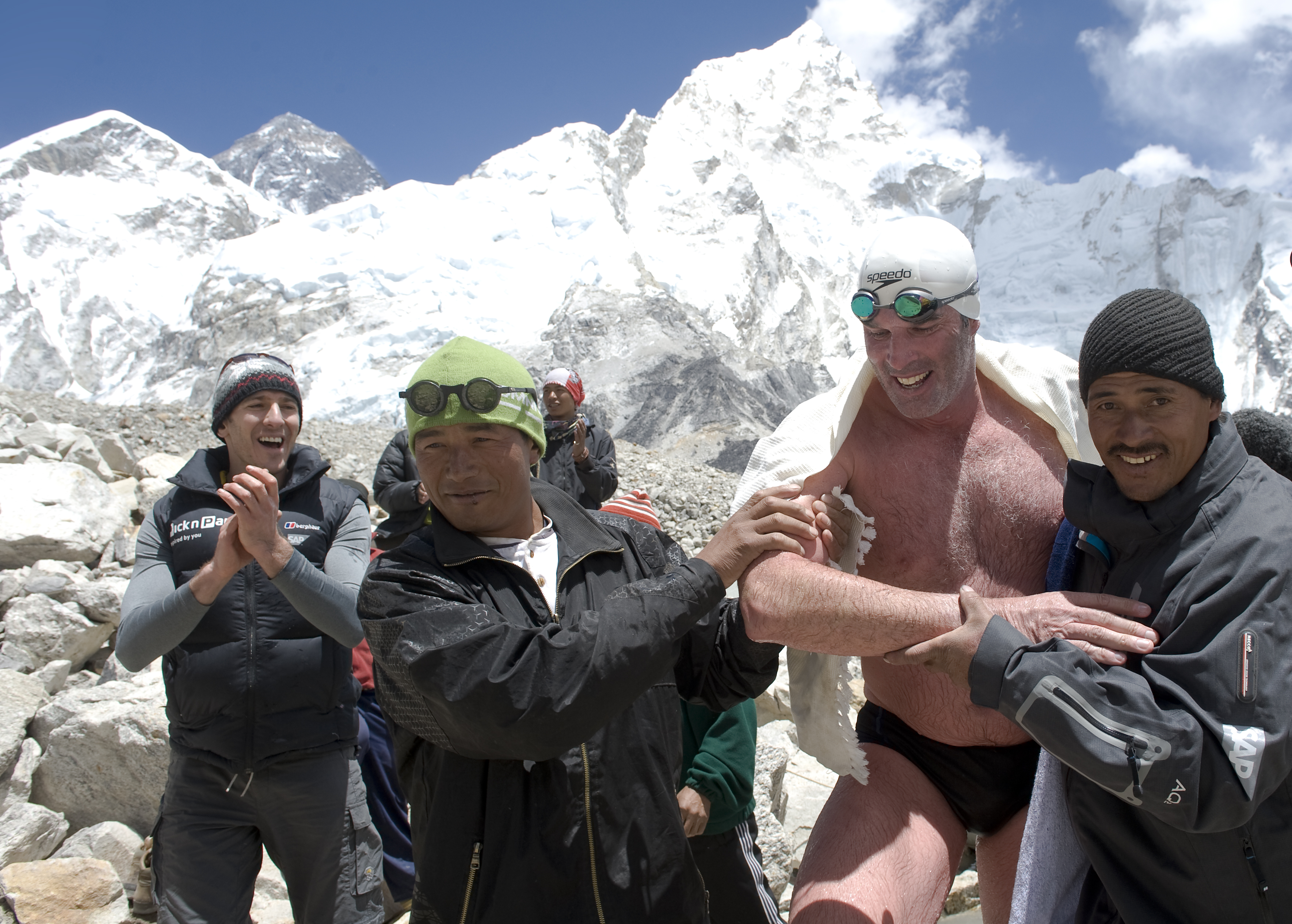
Pugh completing a 1km swim across a glacial lake on Mount Everest

In May 2010 Pugh swam across Lake Pumori, a glacial lake on Mount Everest, to highlight the melting of the glaciers in the Himalayas and the impact the reduced water supply will have on world peace. Millions of people from India, China, Pakistan, Bangladesh and Nepal rely on the water, which flows from the Himalayan glaciers. The 1 km (0.62 mi) swim, at an altitude of 5,300 metres, in 2 °C water (35 °F), took 22 minutes and 51 seconds to complete.

==== The Seven Seas ====
In August 2014, Pugh undertook the first long-distance swim in all the Seven Seas to campaign for more Marine Protected Areas in the region. The swims took place in the following locations:

- Mediterranean Sea – a 10 km swim off Monte Carlo in Monaco
- Adriatic Sea – a 10 km swim off Zadar in Croatia
- Aegean Sea – a 10 km swim off Athens in Greece
- Black Sea – a 10 km swim off Şile in Turkey
- Red Sea – a 10 km swim off Aqaba in Jordan
- Arabian Sea – a 10 km swim off Rass Al Hadd in Oman
- North Sea – a 60 km Thames swim from Southend-on-Sea to the Thames Barrier, east London.

Afterwards Pugh wrote in an op-ed in The New York Times that he had "seriously underestimated the urgency" of the issue he undertook the swim for, noting that he saw "no sharks, no whales, no dolphins" and "no fish longer than 30 centimeters".

==== English Channel ====
In July and August 2018, Pugh swam the entire length of the English Channel – the second person ever to do so after Ross Edgley completed the feat a month before during his 1,780-mile circumnavigation swim around Great Britain. He left Land's End in Cornwall on 12 July and arrived in Dover on 29 August, after 49 days at sea. He swam between 10 and 20 kilometres each day in order to cover the distance. Pugh swam the 528 kilometres (328 miles) to call for 30% of oceans to be protected by 2030. He was greeted on landing at Shakespeare Beach by UK Environment Secretary Michael Gove, who described him as a "modern day hero" and a "brilliant champion for marine conservation zones".

==== Martha's Vineyard ====
In May 2025, Pugh became the first person to swim around the island of Martha's Vineyard, Massachusetts, covering 99.7 km (62.0 mi) over 12 days in near-freezing waters to advocate for shark conservation. The endurance swim, timed to coincide with the 50th anniversary of Jaws, aimed to shift public perception of sharks and highlight the ecological harm of their mass killing, which Pugh described as "ecocide." Although he admitted to fearing sharks, Pugh said he was "really frightened of a world without sharks." Beginning on 15 May, he swam multiple hours daily in 8 °C (47 °F) water, completing the swim on 26 May near the film’s original shooting location. He swam for approximately 24 hours in total and described the effort as one of the most difficult of his nearly 40-year career, citing cold temperatures, distance, and shark migration season, though he said severe weather was the greatest challenge. No sharks were sighted, but he reported seeing sunfish, seals, and terns along the way.

==== Strait of Hormuz ====
In 2026, Pugh swam 15 km (9.3 mi) through the Strait of Hormuz across three days to raise awareness to the environmental damage, which is a threat to local wildlife, caused by the ongoing conflict in the region. On the first day of the swim, a ship was attacked around 4 km (2.5 mi) from his location, and on the second day, he passed close to a liquefied petroleum gas carrier which was on fire after being struck. Fireballs rose into the sky, and the sea around the ship was on fire. He said that the area would take years to recover from the damage caused by the chemical pollution, after so many ships had been sunk in the strait.

== Other roles and achievements ==
In 2016 Pugh played a role in creating the largest marine reserve in the world in the Ross Sea off Antarctica. The media coined the term "Speedo Diplomacy" to describe his efforts of swimming in the icy waters of Antarctica and shuttling between the US and Russia to help negotiate the final agreement on the reserve.

As of 2017, Pugh was serving as an adjunct professor of International Law at the University of Cape Town.

=== Kayaking ===
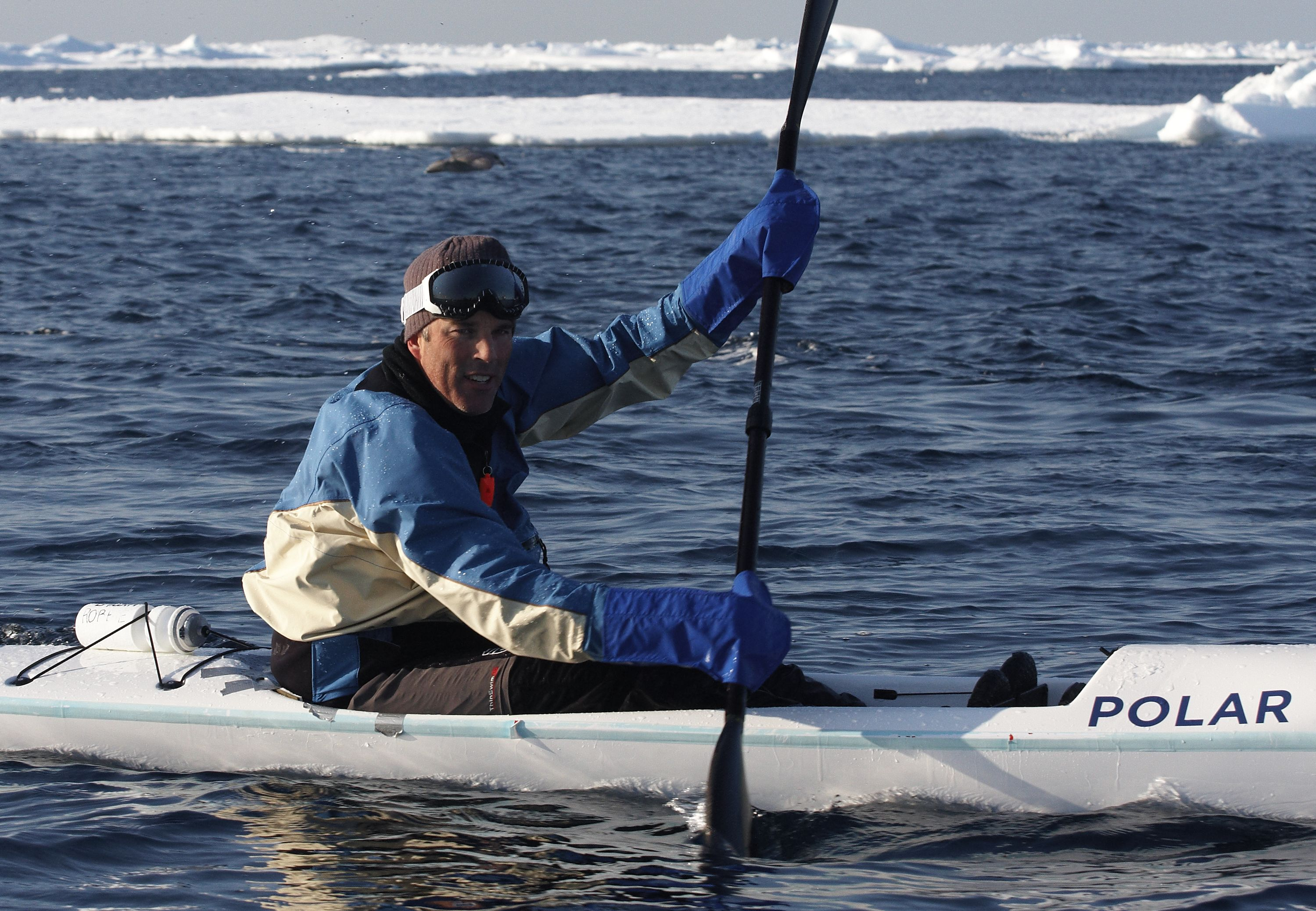
Pugh attempting to kayak to the North Pole in 2008

In September 2008, Pugh, accompanied by a team aboard a ship where he slept, attempted to kayak the 1,200 km from Svalbard, across the Arctic Ocean, to the North Pole, but the team abandoned the effort 135 km from the start. The aim was to further highlight the melting sea ice. The expedition coincided with some scientists predicting that the North Pole could be free of sea-ice in the summer of 2008, for the first time in thousands of years. Pugh stated that despite several attempts, they were unable to find a gap in the ice. In his autobiography Pugh wrote:

"Ironically, global warming played no small part in undermining the entire expedition. We believed that the greater melting of summer ice would open up large areas of sea and allow us to paddle north at good speed. What we did not fully appreciate was that to the north of us there was a widespread melting of sea ice off the coast of Alaska and the New Siberian Islands and the ice was being pushed south towards us ... The evidence of climate change was stark. Fourteen months before I'd sailed north and I'd seen a preponderance of multi-year ice about three metres thick north of Spitsbergen, but this time most of the ice was just a metre thick."

=== Public speaking ===
Pugh has twice spoken at the TED Global Conference and is described on their website as a "master story-teller". The Financial Times reported that his speech at TEDGlobal in 2010 was "the perfect TED talk".

His speech on environmental leadership at the 2008 Business Innovation Forum Conference in the US was voted as one of the "7 Most Inspiring Videos on the Web" by Mashable, the social media guide.

Pugh has addressed the World Economic Forum at their annual meeting in Davos. He also gave the keynote addresses at Coca-Cola's 125th anniversary in 2011, Lloyd's Agency Network's 200th anniversary in 2011, and Swiss Re's 150th anniversary in 2013.

=== Environmental campaigning ===
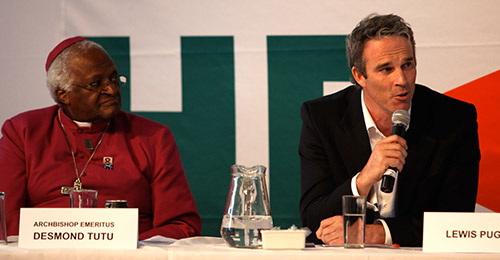
Pugh with Archbishop Desmond Tutu

During his youth Pugh visited many National Parks in South Africa, following his father's desire to teach him to love and respect nature after what he had witnessed whilst serving in the Royal Navy. His father was present at the first British atomic bomb test in 1952 and a number of subsequent tests.

In 2003 Pugh left his maritime law practice to campaign full-time for the protection of the oceans. He often addresses heads of state and business leaders on the topics of climate change, overfishing and pollution and the need for Marine Protected Areas and low-carbon economies.

In 2009, Pugh together with Nobel Peace Prize laureate Archbishop Desmond Tutu took the evidence of witnesses from across Africa on the effects of climate change at the Pan-African Climate and Poverty Hearings. The evidence was presented to the 2009 United Nations Climate Change Conference.

==== Polar Defense Project ====
In 2008 Pugh founded the Polar Defense Project to campaign for greater protection for the Arctic and a resolution of the maritime boundary disputes. In 2009 it won the Best Project for the Environment at the inaugural Beyond Sport Awards.

==== BP oil disaster ====
Pugh was outspoken on the Deepwater Horizon oil spill in the Gulf of Mexico, calling for the criminal prosecution of top BP executives in a feature in Business Day.

==== Fracking for gas in the Karoo ====
Pugh opposes fracking for gas in the Karoo region of South Africa. He made a public speech to Royal Dutch Shell in 2011 titled "Standing up to Goliath".

==== Plastic pollution ====
In 2018, Pugh was listed as the third-most influential person in the world discussing how to tackle plastic pollution on social media.

=== Media ===
Pugh has appeared on numerous TV shows, including Good Morning America, Jay Leno, Richard & Judy, The Daily Show with Jon Stewart and BBC Breakfast. He has also been featured by Dr. Sanjay Gupta on Vital Signs on CNN, ADN on France 2, Carte Blanche and Real Sports with Bryant Gumbel.

In 2009 Pugh starred in Robson Green's Wild Swimming Adventure where he trained the English actor to swim across the icy waters of Llyn Llydaw, a lake on Snowdon in Wales.

In 2013 he appeared on the front of The Big Issue holding a northern rockhopper penguin in an issue dedicated to ocean issues.

== Books ==
In 2010 Pugh's autobiography Achieving the Impossible was published by Simon & Schuster. It quickly became a No. 1 best-seller.

In 2013 Pugh wrote a second book entitled 21 Yaks and a Speedo. The title is a reference to his swim on Mt. Everest. The book is a collection of 21 short stories about his expeditions and the lessons he has learnt from them. It was published by Jonathan Ball Publishers. The Financial Times described the book as "compelling" and Nobel Peace Laureate Archbishop Desmond Tutu said "The book made me want to stand a little taller."

== Recognition and awards ==
Pugh was named a Young Global Leader by the World Economic Forum in 2010 and the United Nations appointed him as the first UN Patron of the Oceans in 2013.

Pugh has been dubbed the "Sir Edmund Hillary of swimming", he is the first person to complete a long-distance swim in every ocean of the world, and he frequently swims in vulnerable ecosystems to draw attention to their plight.

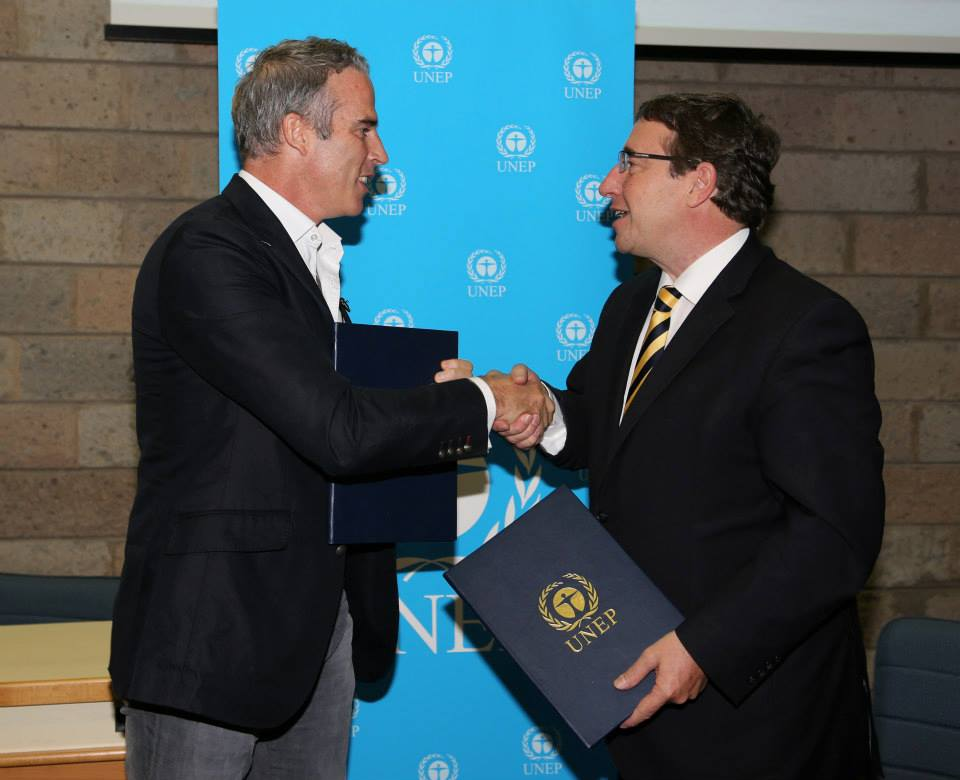
Achim Steiner appointing Pugh as UN Patron of the Oceans

He has been honoured with the following awards:

- 2019 - The Mungo Park Medal from the Royal Scottish Geographical Society
- 2018 - Inducted into the Ice Swimming Hall of Fame
- 2017 - SAB Environmentalist of the Year
- 2017 - The Sunday Times Alternative Rich List for "people who represent the most inspiring side of humanity"
- 2017 – Appointed as an adjunct professor of International Law at the University of Cape Town
- 2015 – Doctor of Science (honoris causa) from Plymouth University
- 2015 – Selected by Men's Journal as one of "50 Most Adventurous Men in the World"
- 2015 – National Geographic Adventurer of the Year
- 2013 – Fellow of the Royal Society of Arts
- 2013 – Appointed as the United Nations Patron of the Oceans
- 2013 – Inducted into the International Marathon Swimming Hall of Fame
- 2013 – Honorary Fellow of the Royal Scottish Geographical Society
- 2011 – Fellow of the Royal Geographical Society, London
- 2011 – President's Award from the International Swimming Hall of Fame
- 2010 – Appointed a Young Global Leader by the World Economic Forum
- 2009 – Awarded the highest honour in South Africa – the Order of Ikhamanga (Gold Class) for his "exceptional sporting triumphs, humanitarian feats and creating consciousness about the negative effects of global warming". This was only the third time a sportsman had received the honour.
- 2009 – Best Project for the Environment – Beyond Sport Awards
- 2008 – Out There Adventurer of the Year
- 2007 – Fellow of The Explorers Club, New York
- 2007 – Paul Harris Fellowship Award by Rotary International
- 2007 – Sports Adventurer of the Year Award by the French Sports Academy
- 2006 – Freedom of the City of London

== Personal life ==
In 2009 Pugh married Antoinette Malherbe, whom he met at school.

Pugh is a descendant of Baptist missionary William Carey. His father's cousin, Carey Heydenrych, participated in the "Great Escape" from the German POW camp Stalag Luft III during the Second World War.
