= Geoff MacLellan =

Canadian politician

The Honourable Geoff MacLellan ECNS

Member of the Nova Scotia House of Assembly for Glace Bay
- In office June 22, 2010 – July 17, 2021
- Preceded by: David Wilson
- Succeeded by: riding redistributed

Personal details
- Born: Sydney, Nova Scotia
- Party: Liberal
- Occupation: politician

Geoffrey Curtis MacLellan is a Canadian politician in the province of Nova Scotia.

== Political career ==
He was elected to the Nova Scotia House of Assembly in a by-election on June 22, 2010, and represented the electoral district of Glace Bay as a Liberal until his retirement from politics in 2021.

MacLellan was re-elected in the 2013 election. On October 22, 2013, MacLellan was appointed to the Executive Council of Nova Scotia where he served as Minister of Transportation and Infrastructure Renewal as well as Minister responsible for the Sydney Tar Ponds Agency and Minister responsible for the Sydney Steel Corporation Act. He was re-elected in the 2017 election.

On June 15, 2017, Premier Stephen McNeil shuffled his cabinet, moving MacLellan to Minister of Business, Minister of Energy, Minister of Trade, and Minister of Service Nova Scotia. On July 5, 2018, MacLellan lost his position as Minister of Energy in a cabinet shuffle, but retained the other portfolios he had prior to the shuffle.

On February 4, 2021, MacLellan announced that he would not seek re-election.

== Electoral record ==
2017 Nova Scotia general election: Glace Bay
Party	Candidate	Votes	%	±%
Liberal	Geoff MacLellan	3,317	46.65	-33.70
Progressive Conservative	John White	2,938	41.32	+36.18
New Democratic	Lois MacDougall	718	10.10	-4.40
Atlantica	Steven James MacNeil	137	1.93	–
Total valid votes		7,110	100	
Total rejected ballots		73	1.03	
Turnout		7,183	57.4	
Eligible voters		12,510		
Liberal hold		Swing		-34.96
Source: Elections Nova Scotia

2013 Nova Scotia general election
Party	Candidate	Votes	%	±%
Liberal	Geoff MacLellan	5,547	80.36	
NDP	Mary Beth MacDonald	1,001	14.50	
PC	Thomas Bethell	355	5.14	

Byelection June 22, 2010
Party	Candidate	Votes	%	±%
Liberal	Geoff MacLellan	3,901	53.91	
NDP	Myrtle Campbell	2,281	31.52	
PC	Michelle Wheelhouse	759	10.48	
Independent	Edna Lee	195	2.69	
Atlantica	Dan Wilson	56	0.77	
