= HMCS Glace Bay =

Two Canadian naval units have been named HMCS Glace Bay.

- HMCS Glace Bay (K414) (I), a River-class frigate was commissioned 2 September 1944 into the Royal Canadian Navy. She was paid off 17 November 1945 and sold to the Chilean Navy.
- HMCS Glace Bay (MM 701) (II), a Kingston-class coastal defence vessel in the Canadian Forces, commissioned in 1996.

== Battle honours ==
- Atlantic, 1944–45
