= D. W. Morrison =

Canadian politician

Daniel William "Dan Willie" Morrison (May 28, 1881 – August 10, 1951) was a miner and political figure in Nova Scotia, Canada. He represented Cape Breton County in the Nova Scotia House of Assembly from 1920 to 1925 as an Independent Labour member.

He was born in Marion Bridge, Cape Breton Island, the son of Angus A. Morrison and Flora McDonald. In 1919, he married Julia McLeod. Morrison served in a battery unit during World War I. He was mayor of Glace Bay from 1921 to 1933 and from 1934 to 1950. He was defeated when he ran for reelection in 1925 and was an unsuccessful candidate for a seat in the House of Commons in 1926. Morrison represented Canadian Labour at the League of Nations from 1930 to 1937. He was district president for the United Mine Workers of America from 1928 to 1942 and auditor for that organization from 1942 to 1951. Morrison served on the Dominion Coal Board from 1947 to 1951. He died in Glace Bay at the age of 70.

Morrison Glace Bay High School is named after him.
