= Camps Bay High School =

High School in Cape Town

Coordinates: 33°56′39″S 18°22′41″E

Location
- Lower Kloof Road, Camps Bay; Cape Town, Western Cape; South Africa

Information
- School type: Public
- Motto: Strive for the Highest
- Religious affiliation: Christianity
- School district: District 4
- School number: 021 438 1507
- Headmaster: Mr Louis Mostert
- Grades: 8–12
- Gender: Boys & Girls
- Age: 14 to 18
- Enrollment: 1,000 pupils
- Language: English
- Schedule: 08:00 - 15:00
- Campus: Urban Campus
- Campus type: Suburban
- Colours: Green; White
- Rival: Groote Schuur High School; Westerford High School
- Accreditation: Western Cape Education Department
- School fees: R42,000 (tuition)

Camps Bay High School is a public English medium co-educational high school situated in the suburb of Camps Bay of Cape Town in the Western Cape province of South Africa.

== Sport ==
Camps Bay High School has sports during the year.

The sports that are offered in the school are:

- Athletics
- Basketball
- Cricket
- Cross country
- Hockey
- Rugby
- Soccer
- Squash
- Swimming
- Tennis
- Water polo

== Notable alumni ==
- David Perel, racing driver
- Lewis Pugh, swimmer and environmentalist
- Stelio Savante, actor, producer and writer
- Simon Thirsk, swimmer
