= False Bay High School =

Coordinates: 34°7′5″S 18°49′58″E

- Strand, Western Cape; South Africa

Information
- Type: High School - Private
- Motto: The Private School that Cares
- Established: 16 January 1999
- School district: Western Cape, Helderberg
- Headmaster: Herman Janse van Rensburg
- Grades: 8–12
- Enrollment: 40 (full time)
- Affiliation: Western Cape Education Department
- Website: www.falsebayhigh.co.za

False Bay High School is a private school in the Strand of the Western Cape province of South Africa, founded by Herman and Lisa Janse van Rensburg in January 1999. It was originally established in Somerset West, and later moved to its current location in the Strand.

== History ==
False Bay High School was founded by Herman L Janse van Rensburg on 16 January 1999. The school started with six students. The first venue was 4 Loerie Street, Somerset West, Western Cape, South Africa. By the end of the year, there were 26 students in the school. The original name of the school was Helderberg Private School. As there are other schools that use "Helderberg" in their names, the Western Cape Education Department asked the owners to change the name of the school. Since 2000, the school has been known as False Bay High School.

In January 2000, the school moved to 5 Almeida Street, Strand, Western Cape when the owners of the school bought the new venue. As the city council did not give permission to use this address as a school, the school moved to a rented venue at 79 Andries Pretorius Street in January 2003.

The school moved to 37 Edison Street in September 2004. Once again the school had to move. The plot had a clause in the title deed against running any business from it and the minister of environmental affairs of the Western Cape was not prepared to give permission to lift this clause.

The school then moved to 27 Van der Merwe Street, Strand in January 2007. The city council approved this venue. The founder of the school and his wife bought this big house from the church Nederduits Gereformeerde Kerk Suider-Strand. The church used this house as a rectory. The founder of the school lived in this rectory for thirteen years as a child. His father was the minister of this church until 1977.

The founder has been the headmaster since January 1999.

== Size ==
The school limits the number of students to 40 full-time students. The school provides dual instruction in Afrikaans and English. The school has a Christian ethos, but accepts students of other religions.

Due to the size of the school, it does not offer extramural sport. Some of the students participate in sport teams and clubs at other schools.

== Education ==
False Bay High School's curriculum follows the prescriptions of the National Department of Basic Education in South Africa. The application of the curriculum is monitored by the Western Cape Education Department. The lowest Matric average was recorded in 2008 at 47%.

The school teaches the prescribed GET Curriculum in grades 8 and 9.
