= John White (Nova Scotia politician) =

Canadian politician

John White MLA

Member of the Nova Scotia House of Assembly for Glace Bay-Dominion
- Incumbent
- Assumed office August 17, 2021
- Preceded by: first member

Personal details
- Born: John Hugh White; March 23, 1967 (age 59) Glace Bay, Nova Scotia
- Party: Progressive Conservative

John Hugh White (born March 23, 1967) is a Canadian politician who was elected to the Nova Scotia House of Assembly in the 2021 Nova Scotia general election. He represents the riding of Glace Bay-Dominion as a member of the Progressive Conservative Association of Nova Scotia.

On October 21, 2025, White was appointed to the Executive Council of Nova Scotia as Minister of Housing.

He is a mental health professional and Chair of the Nova Scotia Critical Incident Stress Management Team.

== Electoral record ==
2024 Nova Scotia general election: Glace Bay-Dominion
Party	Candidate	Votes	%	±%
Progressive Conservative	John White	4,187	72.31	+37.71
Liberal	David Alexander MacLeod	1,009	17.43	-13.72
New Democratic	Kathy Chapman	594	10.26	-23.98
Total		5,790	–	
Total rejected ballots		57		
Turnout		5,847	43.79	
Eligible voters		13,353		
Progressive Conservative hold		Swing		
Source: Elections Nova Scotia

2021 Nova Scotia general election: Glace Bay-Dominion
Party	Candidate	Votes	%	±%	Expenditures
Progressive Conservative	John White	2,754	34.61	-4.52	$37,763.63
New Democratic	John Morgan	2,725	34.24	+19.63	$55,096.40
Liberal	John John McCarthy	2,479	31.15	-13.44	$39,681.23
Total valid votes/expense limit		7,958	99.45	–	$79,292.15
Total rejected ballots		44	0.55		
Turnout		8,002	58.98		
Eligible voters		13,567			
Progressive Conservative gain from Liberal		Swing		+4.46	
Source: Elections Nova Scotia
