= Golden Bay High School =

State secondary (year 7–13) school in New Zealand

- Te Waka Kura o Mohua

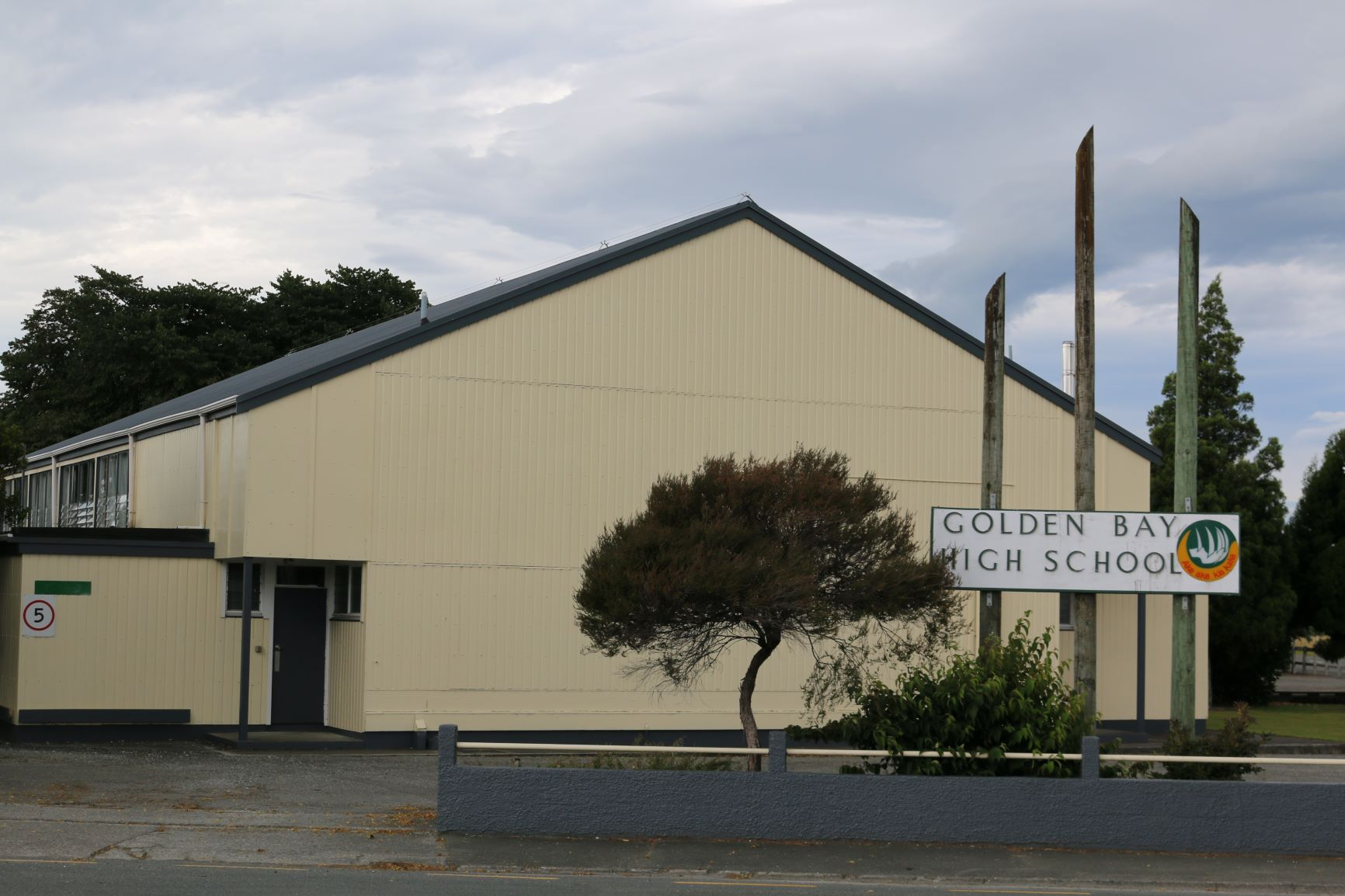

Location
- 12 Waitapu Road; Tākaka, Golden Bay; 7110; New Zealand; 40°50′53″S 172°48′28″E

Information
- School type: Government Funded, Secondary School
- Motto: Ake Ake Kia Kaha; For ever and ever be strong
- Established: 1862
- Status: Open
- Authority: State: Not integrated
- Ministry of Education Institution no.: 292
- Chairperson: Andy Williams
- Principal: Jono Hay
- Teaching staff: 30
- Gender: Co-Ed; Boys 52% Girls 48%
- Age range: Years 7–13
- Enrolment: 300 (July 2026)
- Student to teacher ratio: 14:1
- Language: English
- Hours in school day: 6 hours 25 minutes
- Houses: Blue; Green; Yellow; Red
- Colours: Green and gold
- Sports: Association football, basketball & netball
- Rival: Other High Schools in Nelson/Tasman Region
- Publication: Goldie (fortnightly school newsletter)
- Yearbook: The School Magazine
- Feeder schools: Tākaka Primary School; Motupipi School; Central Takaka School
- Website: www.gbh.school.nz

Golden Bay High School (Māori: Te Waka Kura o Mohua) is a secondary school in Tākaka, New Zealand. It is one of two secondary schools in Golden Bay / Mohua; the other one is the Collingwood Area School in Collingwood.

== Enrolment ==
As of July 2026, Golden Bay High School has roll of 300 students, of which 36 (12.0%) identify as Māori.

As of 2026, the school has an Equity Index of 450, placing it amongst schools whose students have average socioeconomic barriers to achievement (roughly equivalent to decile 7 under the former socio-economic decile system).

== Notable students ==
- Toni Hodgkinson (born 1971), middle-distance runner
