= Glace Bay High School =

Location
- 201 Reserve Street; Glace Bay, Nova Scotia, B1A 4W3; Canada; 46°11′19.2″N 59°58′43.6″W

Information
- School type: High school
- Motto: The Spirit of the Black Panther
- Founded: 1989
- School board: Cape Breton - Victoria Regional Centre for Education
- Principal: Tanya Jamieson
- Grades: 9-12
- Enrollment: Around 850-900
- Language: English
- Area: Glace Bay
- Colours: Black, White and Red
- Mascot: Panther
- Website: sites.google.com/gnspes.ca/glace-bay-high

Glace Bay High School is a high school in Glace Bay, Nova Scotia, Canada. The school was built in 1989 and is located on Reserve Street.

== Origins ==
Glace Bay High School was formed by combining the students of the former Morrison Glace Bay High School and Saint Michael's High School both of which became Junior High schools. Then in 1994 Donkin-Morien and Reserve District High Schools were closed and their students absorbed into the GBHS population causing the student population to rise to almost 1300. Morrison Junior High School and Saint Michael's Junior High School both closed in 2010 with the construction of Ocean View Education Centre. Ocean View Education Centre is now the only school in Glace Bay that is exclusively junior high.
