= Glace Bay =

Community in Nova Scotia, Canada

- Location of Glace Bay in Nova Scotia
- Coordinates: 46.19695°N 59.95698°W
- Country: Canada
- Province: Nova Scotia
- Regional Municipality: Cape Breton Regional Municipality
- Founded: 1785
- Incorporated City: 1901
- Amalgamated: August 1, 1995

Area
  - Total: 31.19 km^{2} (12.04 sq mi)
- Elevation: 0 to 56 m (0 to 184 ft)

Population (2021) From Statistics Canada
  - Total: 16,915
  - Density: 542.4/km^{2} (1,405/sq mi)
- Time zone: UTC-4 (AST)
  - Summer (DST): UTC-3 (ADT)
- Canadian Postal code: B1A
- Area code: 902
- Telephone Exchange: 849, 842

Glace Bay is a community in the eastern part of the Cape Breton Regional Municipality in Nova Scotia, Canada. It forms part of the general area referred to as Industrial Cape Breton.

Formerly an incorporated town (1901–1995), the municipal government in Glace Bay was dissolved and the community was amalgamated into the larger regional municipality. Prior to amalgamation, Glace Bay had been the province's fourth largest urban area and the largest town in Nova Scotia by population.

Neighbouring communities include Reserve Mines, Dominion, and Tower Road.

== History ==
As early as the 1720s, the French inhabited the area to supply Fortress of Louisbourg with coal. They named the location baie de Glace (literally, Bay of Ice) because of the sea ice which filled the ocean each winter. In 1748, after the capture of Fortress Louisbourg, the British constructed Fort William at Table Head in order to protect a mine that produced coal to supply the Louisbourg garrison. The fort itself was a blockhouse, brought from Boston, with a palisade. When Cape Breton Island was returned to French control, Fort William continued in service until 1752 when it was destroyed by fire.

Census	Population
Town
1891	2,459
1901	6,945
1911	16,562
1921	17,007
1931	20,706
1941	25,050
1951	25,586
1956	24,416
1961	24,186
1971	22,440
1981	21,466
1986	20,467
1991	19,501
Urban Area
2001	21,187
2006	19,968
2011	19,076
2016	17,556
2021	16,915

More permanent settlement of Glace Bay probably can be dated from 1818 when Walter Blackett obtained a grant of land on the south side of the Bay. Coal mining existed on a small scale until the 1860s, when four mines were in operation within the future town boundaries. These included the Hub, Harbour, Caledonia and Glace Bay Collieries. The first large mine, the Hub Shaft of Glace Bay opened in 1861 and a total of 12 mines in Glace Bay were in operation. Following the formation of the Dominion Coal Company in 1893, the coal mining industry expanded significantly in what was to become Glace Bay with the opening of several new mines. In 1894, the government gave exclusive mining rights to the Dominion Coal Company.

Small communities grew up around the mines and by 1901 they came together to form the Town of Glace Bay. At the time of incorporation, the population was 6,945. During the early 20th century, mining companies recruited in the American South for workers, attracting African Americans from Mississippi. By the 1940s, the figure exceeded 28,000 and Glace Bay became Canada's largest town (in population). At one time, the town had 12 collieries but none remains. Because of this industrial decline, jobs left and the core population decreased to 16,984 as of 2001. The city has been dissolved/deincorporated since municipal amalgamation in 1995, which formed the Cape Breton Regional Municipality.

== Economy ==
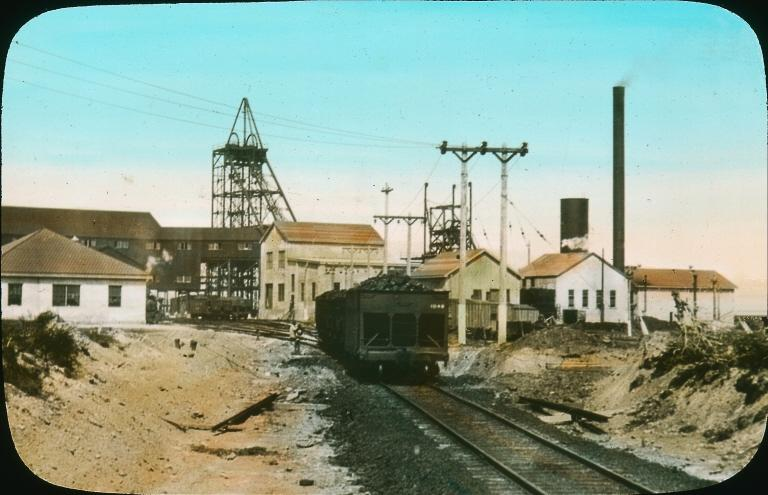
Coal mine, Glace Bay, NS, 1930

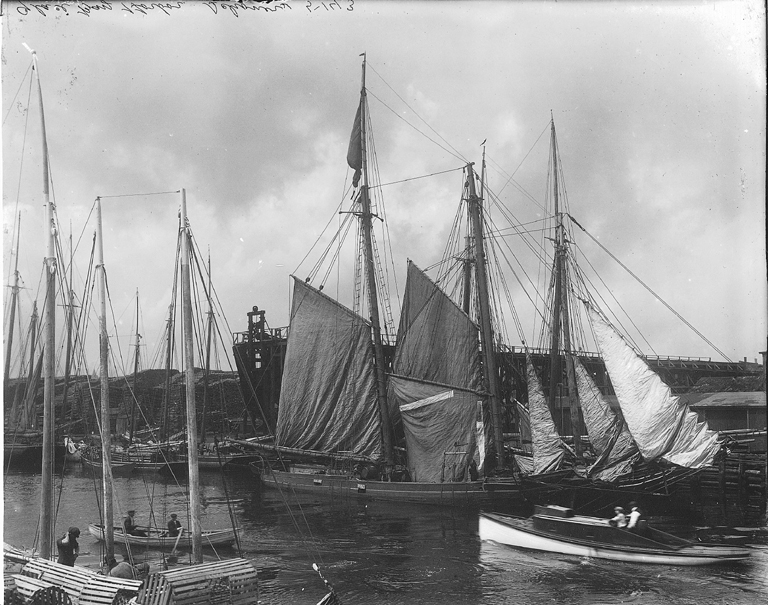
Schooners, Glace Bay, 1914

Glace Bay was once a coal mining town. In 1860, the Glace Bay Mining Company was formed and it operated two mines. The first large colliery, the Hub Shaft, opened in 1861. Large-scale mining commenced in 1893 after exclusive mining rights were granted to the Dominion Coal Company. Glace Bay was incorporated as a town on January 18, 1901. At its high point the company operated eleven mines in all, and was responsible for 40% of Canada's coal production. Coal was transported on the Sydney and Louisburg Railway to both of those ports for shipping. The S & L Railway's main operations, including the roundhouse and machine shops were located in Glace Bay. Glace Bay's extensive coal and rail operations made the town the industrial center of Cape Breton. As coal mining became less important, the mines were closed until, in 1984 Colliery No. 26 was closed by the Cape Breton Development Corporation. Many residents of Glace Bay started to work at the two other coal mines in the area: Prince Colliery in Point Aconi and Phalen Colliery and Lingan Colliery in Lingan. However, coal mining continued its decline with Lingan closing in the mid-1990s, followed by Phalen in 1999 and Prince in 2001.

Fishing was also an important industry throughout the 20th century. However, by the 1990s fish stocks were so depleted that the fishery was closed. Some fish processing still occurs here.

== Present day ==
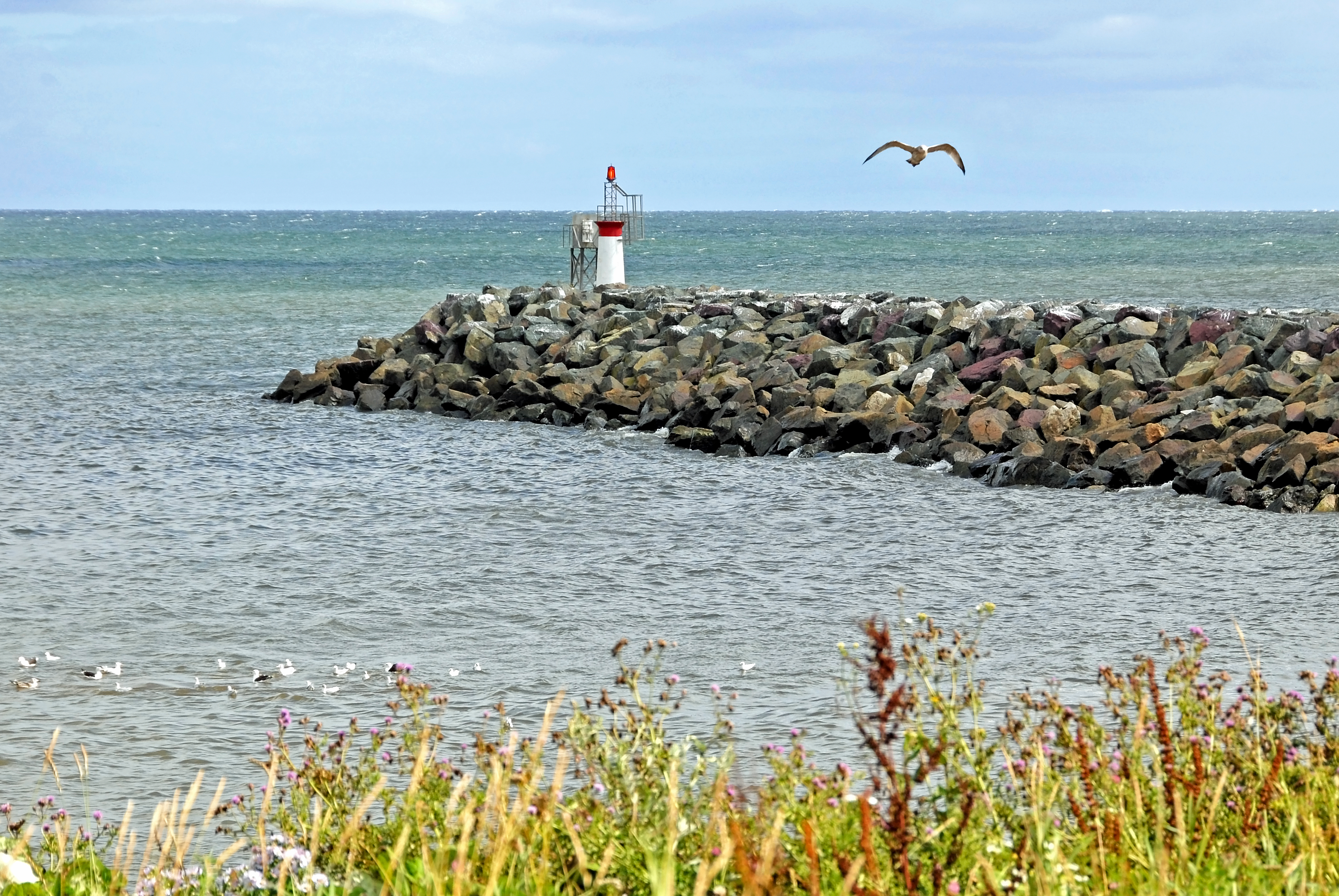
Glace Bay North Breakwater Light

The former town of Glace Bay has a population of slightly fewer than 20,000 people. In 2001, a call centre operated by Stream Global Services, using post-industrialization subsidies, opened. The building is today owned by Concentrix.

The Swiss mining consortium Xstrata was the primary partner in the Donkin Coal Development Alliance, which won the rights to develop an abandoned mine site in the nearby community of Donkin. Currently, the mine is owned by Kameron Collieries, a subsidiary of Cline Group LLC, which purchased the operation in 2014–2015. Coal production commenced in February 2016 and by the fall of 2018, the mine had 120 employees.

== Historical features and places ==
=== Marconi National Historic Site ===
The Marconi National Historic Site of Canada is located at Table Head in Glace Bay. Parks Canada maintains an interpretive centre at the site honouring the role of Guglielmo Marconi in the development of radio communications. In December 1902, Marconi transmitted the first complete messages to Poldhu from stations at Glace Bay, Nova Scotia.

Marconi chose this site for its elevated flat expanse and unobstructed view out over the ocean. Some of the concrete footings for the massive towers can still be seen on the grounds. Marconi built a much larger wireless site west of here then known as Marconi Towers. In 1907 he initiated the first permanent transatlantic wireless service from Marconi Towers to its companion site in Clifden, Ireland.

=== Cape Breton Miners Museum ===
The Cape Breton Miners Museum is located on top of the Ocean Deep Colliery, which is only 1 kilometer from downtown Glace Bay. The museum is privately run and relies on donations and government grants for its operations. During the summer season, the museum offers a walking underground mine tour with a retired coal miner, and a virtual simulator tour of an underground mine. The museum is also home to The Men of the Deeps choir.

=== Savoy Theatre ===
The Savoy Theatre is a historic Victorian-Style theatre, established in 1901, with the present theatre building dating from 1927, operating as an arts and culture centre in Glace Bay. Its main auditorium has a capacity of 761 including the balcony. The Savoy's foyer also hosts events (dinner theatres, weddings, reunions) for up to 100 people.

The Savoy Theatre has previously featured Rita MacNeil, The Rankin Family, The Barra MacNeils, Ashley MacIssac, The White Stripes, The Barenaked Ladies, k.d. lang, Mr. Dressup, Sarah McLachlan, The Royal Winnipeg Ballet, Blue Rodeo, Liona Boyd, Harry Chapin, Melissa Etheridge, Leonard Cohen, and many others.

== Geography ==
=== Landscape ===
The local landscape is heavily forested and hilly. Some of the low-lying areas at the bottom of hills consist of marshes and bogs. There are rocky cliffs around the ocean along most of the coast and erosion continues to be a problem in some areas; part of North Street fell into the ocean due to erosion and the street was split into Upper and Lower North Street.

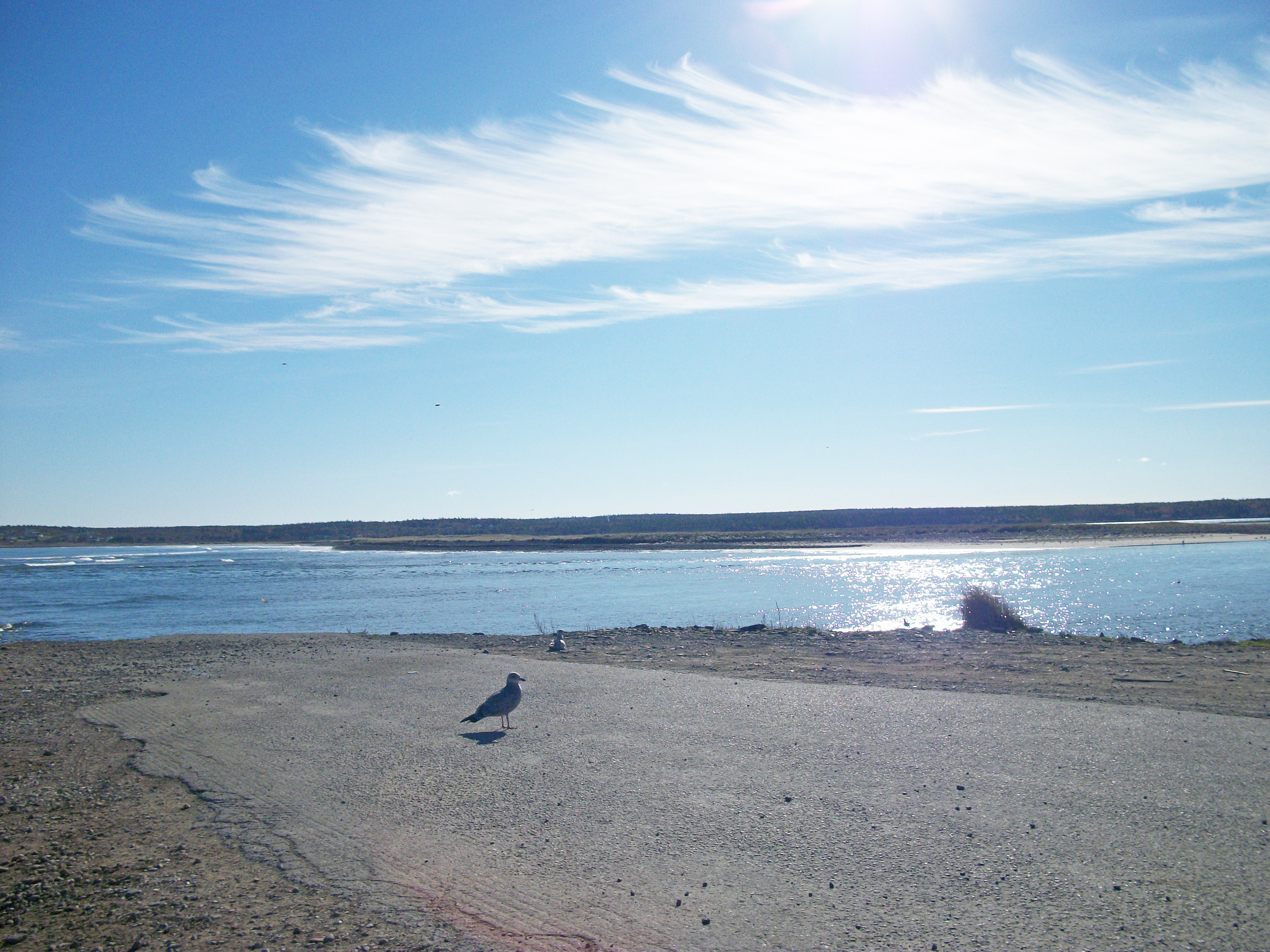
Glace Bay shoreline

Many areas surrounding former coal mines are experiencing subsidence as the old mine shafts collapse. There are several brownfields around the community at former industrial sites.

=== Flora and fauna ===
Glace Bay has a large amount of forests and swamp surrounding the town and within the town limits. Mammals present in Glace Bay include squirrels, rabbits, fox, deer, mice, muskrats, cats, dogs, and coyotes. Bird species include ducks, great horned owls, Canada geese, crows, gulls, and pigeons. Pheasants are occasionally seen around wooded areas. Smaller birds such as robins, black capped chickadees, and sparrows are also present. Frogs, salamanders, and snakes are also common in Glace Bay.

Glace Bay and the surrounding areas are heavily forested. Common deciduous trees in Glace Bay include poplar, maples, and birches. Oaks, elms and beech trees are also present but they are less common. Common conifers include spruce and balsam with some pine and tamaracks present as well.

The introduced Asian plants of Japanese and Giant Knotweed are common throughout the town and surrounding woodlands and are colloquially known as "elephant ears".

=== Climate ===
Glace Bay experiences a cool summer, and windy, wet and stormy winter, a version of a humid continental climate (Köppen Dfb) that is significantly moderated by the community's proximity to the Atlantic Ocean. The highest temperature ever recorded in Glace Bay was 36.7 °C (98 °F) on 18 August 1935. The lowest temperature ever recorded was −31.7 °C (−25 °F) on 31 January 1873, 29 January 1877 and 15 February 1916.

Because of its close proximity to the Atlantic Ocean, Glace Bay, like all of Cape Breton Island, experiences strong seasonal lag. The ocean does not reach its maximum temperature until mid August. It usually stays there until early September. This makes August the hottest month in Glace Bay rather than July which is usually the hottest in most northern continental climates. February is also the coldest month on average rather than January.

Climate data for Sydney Airport, 1981–2010 normals, extremes 1870–present (Note: Based on station coordinates provided by Environment Canada, climate data was collected near downtown Sydney from January 1870 to March 1941, and from April 1941 to the present day at Sydney Airport.)
Month	Jan	Feb	Mar	Apr	May	Jun	Jul	Aug	Sep	Oct	Nov	Dec	Year
Record high humidex	18.2	19.0	25.0	26.0	36.8	43.4	41.8	41.9	38.9	30.4	25.5	18.5	43.4
Record high °C (°F)	16.9 (62.4)	18.0 (64.4)	24.0 (75.2)	27.2 (81.0)	31.1 (88.0)	34.4 (93.9)	33.9 (93.0)	36.7 (98.1)	32.3 (90.1)	27.2 (81.0)	22.2 (72.0)	16.7 (62.1)	36.7 (98.1)
Mean daily maximum °C (°F)	−1.1 (30.0)	−1.5 (29.3)	1.5 (34.7)	6.6 (43.9)	13.1 (55.6)	18.6 (65.5)	23.1 (73.6)	22.9 (73.2)	18.8 (65.8)	12.6 (54.7)	7.3 (45.1)	2.1 (35.8)	10.3 (50.5)
Daily mean °C (°F)	−5.4 (22.3)	−5.9 (21.4)	−2.6 (27.3)	2.5 (36.5)	7.9 (46.2)	13.2 (55.8)	17.9 (64.2)	18.0 (64.4)	14.0 (57.2)	8.5 (47.3)	3.8 (38.8)	−1.5 (29.3)	5.9 (42.6)
Mean daily minimum °C (°F)	−9.6 (14.7)	−10.3 (13.5)	−6.7 (19.9)	−1.6 (29.1)	2.7 (36.9)	7.7 (45.9)	12.6 (54.7)	13.1 (55.6)	9.1 (48.4)	4.3 (39.7)	0.2 (32.4)	−5 (23)	1.4 (34.5)
Record low °C (°F)	−31.7 (−25.1)	−31.7 (−25.1)	−31.1 (−24.0)	−17.8 (0.0)	−7.8 (18.0)	−3.9 (25.0)	0.6 (33.1)	2.2 (36.0)	−2.2 (28.0)	−5.6 (21.9)	−13.9 (7.0)	−23.3 (−9.9)	−31.7 (−25.1)
Record low wind chill	−42.6	−41.1	−34.3	−21.4	−11.3	−6.1	0.0	0.0	−5.1	−10.5	−19.3	−31.3	−42.6
Average precipitation mm (inches)	152.5 (6.00)	128.1 (5.04)	130.0 (5.12)	133.3 (5.25)	103.2 (4.06)	96.9 (3.81)	88.5 (3.48)	100.2 (3.94)	118.7 (4.67)	142.9 (5.63)	156.0 (6.14)	167.0 (6.57)	1,517.2 (59.73)
Average rainfall mm (inches)	80.5 (3.17)	63.8 (2.51)	83.2 (3.28)	112.2 (4.42)	100.9 (3.97)	96.9 (3.81)	88.5 (3.48)	100.2 (3.94)	118.7 (4.67)	142.2 (5.60)	144.0 (5.67)	111.2 (4.38)	1,242.4 (48.91)
Average snowfall cm (inches)	74.3 (29.3)	65.3 (25.7)	48.1 (18.9)	21.4 (8.4)	2.3 (0.9)	0.0 (0.0)	0.0 (0.0)	0.0 (0.0)	0.0 (0.0)	0.62 (0.24)	12.4 (4.9)	58.5 (23.0)	283.0 (111.4)
Average precipitation days (≥ 0.2 mm)	20.6	16.5	16.6	15.8	14.5	14.0	11.7	12.7	13.5	15.9	18.1	21.0	191.0
Average rainy days (≥ 0.2 mm)	8.4	7.3	9.5	13.0	14.1	14.0	11.7	12.7	13.5	15.8	15.4	11.5	146.9
Average snowy days (≥ 0.2 cm)	16.6	12.6	11.0	5.6	0.83	0.0	0.0	0.0	0.0	0.62	5.4	14.2	66.8
Average relative humidity (%) (at 15:00 LST)	72.5	72.0	69.8	69.7	65.0	64.9	65.2	65.2	67.6	70.5	74.2	75.9	69.2
Mean monthly sunshine hours	91.0	111.6	132.9	141.0	198.0	224.6	246.9	228.4	167.1	130.1	77.0	68.2	1,816.7
Percentage possible sunshine	32.4	38.3	36.1	34.7	42.7	47.7	51.8	52.0	44.3	38.3	27.1	25.3	39.2
Source: Environment Canada

== Politics ==
Federally, Glace Bay is located in the riding of Cape Breton–Canso, currently held by Liberal MP Mike Kelloway. Provincially, the riding of Glace Bay-Dominion is currently held by Progressive Conservative MLA John White who was elected in the 2021 Nova Scotia provincial election. The riding had been held previously by Liberal MLA Geoff MacLellan who did not re-offer.

== Mayors of Glace Bay ==
While Glace Bay was a town, the following people were its mayor:

- David M. Burchell 1901–1907
- John Carey Douglas 1907–1910
- Henry MacDonald 1910–1912
- Gordon S. Harrington 1912–1915
- Dan Cameron 1915–1916
- Angus J. MacDonald 1917
- Alonzo O'Neill 1918–1920
- E. MacK Forbes 1920–1921
- Dan W. Morrison 1921–1933
- Charles MacVicar 1933–1934
- Dan W. Morrison 1934–1950
- Dan A. MacDonald 1950–1970
- Dan A. Munroe 1970–1981
- Bruce A. Clark 1981–1988
- Donald MacInnis 1988–1995

== Attractions ==
- Savoy Theatre
- Cape Breton Miners Museum
- Marconi Museum
- Miners Village
- Renwick Brook Park
- Queen Elizabeth Park
- Glace Bay Heritage Museum
- John Bernard Croak Memorial Park

== See also ==
- Reserve Mines
- Dominion
- Cape Breton Island
- Province of Cape Breton
- Royal eponyms in Canada—locales in Canada named for royalty akin to Queen Elizabeth Park in Glace Bay
