= List of members of the Canadian House of Commons (M) =

== Ma ==
- Michael Ma first elected in 2025 as Conservative member for Markham—Unionville, Ontario.

== Maca–Macdi ==
- Joseph Macaluso b. 1931 first elected in 1963 as Liberal member for Hamilton West, Ontario.
- Lawrence MacAulay b. 1946 first elected in 1988 as Liberal member for Cardigan, Prince Edward Island.
- Arthur Allister MacBain b. 1925 first elected in 1980 as Liberal member for Niagara Falls, Ontario.
- William Burton MacDiarmid b. 1875 first elected in 1940 as Liberal member for Glengarry, Ontario.

== Macdonald–Macdonell ==
- Albert Frederick Macdonald b. 1901 first elected in 1949 as Liberal member for Edmonton East, Alberta.
- Alexander Barrett Macdonald b. 1918 first elected in 1957 as Cooperative Commonwealth Federation member for Vancouver Kingsway, British Columbia.
- Alexander Francis Macdonald b. 1818 first elected in 1874 as Liberal member for Cornwall, Ontario.
- Angus Lewis Macdonald b. 1890 first elected in 1940 as Liberal member for Kingston City, Ontario.
- Angus Ronald Macdonald b. 1901 first elected in 1957 as Progressive Conservative member for Antigonish—Guysborough, Nova Scotia.
- Archibald John Macdonald b. 1876 first elected in 1925 as Liberal member for Glengarry, Ontario.
- Augustine Colin Macdonald b. 1837 first elected in 1873 as Liberal-Conservative member for King's County, Prince Edward Island.
- Daniel Joseph MacDonald b. 1918 first elected in 1972 as Liberal member for Cardigan, Prince Edward Island.
- David MacDonald b. 1936 first elected in 1965 as Progressive Conservative member for Prince, Prince Edward Island.
- Donald Alexander Macdonald b. 1817 first elected in 1867 as Liberal member for Glengarry, Ontario.
- Donald Stovel Macdonald b. 1932 first elected in 1962 as Liberal member for Rosedale, Ontario.
- Edward Mortimer Macdonald b. 1865 first elected in 1904 as Liberal member for Pictou, Nova Scotia.
- Finlay MacDonald b. 1866 first elected in 1925 as Conservative member for Cape Breton South, Nova Scotia.
- Flora Isabel MacDonald b. 1926 first elected in 1972 as Progressive Conservative member for Kingston and the Islands, Ontario.
- Heath MacDonald b. 1966 first elected in 2021 as Liberal member for Malpeque, Prince Edward Island.
- Hugh John Macdonald b. 1850 first elected in 1891 as Liberal-Conservative member for Winnipeg, Manitoba.
- John Macdonald (Canadian politician) b. 1824 first elected in 1875 as Independent Liberal member for Toronto Centre, Ontario.
- John Alexander Macdonald (Prince Edward Island politician) b. 1874 first elected in 1925 as Conservative member for King's, Prince Edward Island.
- John Alexander Macdonald (Nova Scotia politician) b. 1883 first elected in 1925 as Conservative member for Richmond—West Cape Breton, Nova Scotia.
- John Alexander Macdonald b. 1815 first elected in 1867 as Liberal-Conservative member for Kingston, Ontario.
- John Augustine Macdonald b. 1913 first elected in 1957 as Progressive Conservative member for King's, Prince Edward Island.
- John Sandfield Macdonald b. 1812 first elected in 1867 as Liberal member for Cornwall, Ontario.
- Kent MacDonald first elected in 2025 as Liberal member for Cardigan, Prince Edward Island.
- Margaret Mary Macdonald b. 1910 first elected in 1961 as Progressive Conservative member for King's, Prince Edward Island.
- Peter Macdonald b. 1835 first elected in 1887 as Liberal member for Huron East, Ontario.
- Ronald MacDonald b. 1955 first elected in 1988 as Liberal member for Dartmouth, Nova Scotia.
- Wilbur MacDonald b. 1933 first elected in 1979 as Progressive Conservative member for Cardigan, Prince Edward Island.
- William Chisholm Macdonald b. 1889 first elected in 1940 as Liberal member for Halifax, Nova Scotia.
- William Ross Macdonald b. 1891 first elected in 1935 as Liberal member for Brantford City, Ontario.
- Angus Claude Macdonell b. 1861 first elected in 1904 as Conservative member for Toronto South, Ontario.
- Donald Greenfield MacDonell b. 1849 first elected in 1880 as Liberal member for Lanark North, Ontario.
- George Hugh Macdonell b. 1851 first elected in 1891 as Conservative member for Algoma, Ontario.
- John Alexander MacDonell b. 1854 first elected in 1896 as Liberal member for Selkirk, Manitoba.
- James MacKerras Macdonnell b. 1884 first elected in 1945 as Progressive Conservative member for Muskoka—Ontario, Ontario.

== Macdou–Mack ==
- Colin MacDougall b. 1834 first elected in 1874 as Liberal member for Elgin East, Ontario.
- Isaac Duncan MacDougall b. 1897 first elected in 1925 as Conservative member for Inverness, Nova Scotia.
- John Alexander Frances MacDougall b. 1947 first elected in 1982 as Progressive Conservative member for Timiskaming, Ontario.
- John Lorne MacDougall b. 1898 first elected in 1949 as Liberal member for Vancouver—Burrard, British Columbia.
- Day Hort MacDowall b. 1850 first elected in 1887 as Conservative member for Provisional District of Saskatchewan, Northwest Territories.
- Allan MacEachen b. 1921 first elected in 1953 as Liberal member for Inverness—Richmond, Nova Scotia.
- Howard Russell Macewan b. 1925 first elected in 1957 as Progressive Conservative member for Pictou, Nova Scotia.
- Angus MacFarlane b. 1925 first elected in 1974 as Liberal member for Hamilton Mountain, Ontario.
- Robert MacFarlane b. 1835 first elected in 1867 as Liberal member for Perth South, Ontario.
- Alistair MacGregor b. 1979 first elected in 2015 as New Democratic Party member for Cowichan—Malahat—Langford, British Columbia.
- Mark R. MacGuigan b. 1931 first elected in 1968 as Liberal member for Windsor—Walkerville, Ontario.
- Angus MacInnis b. 1884 first elected in 1930 as Independent Labour member for Vancouver South, British Columbia.
- Donald MacInnis b. 1918 first elected in 1957 as Progressive Conservative member for Cape Breton South, Nova Scotia.
- Malcolm MacInnis b. 1933 first elected in 1962 as New Democratic Party member for Cape Breton South, Nova Scotia.
- Grace MacInnis b. 1905 first elected in 1965 as New Democratic Party member for Vancouver Kingsway, British Columbia.
- Bryce Mackasey b. 1921 first elected in 1962 as Liberal member for Verdun, Quebec.
- Elmer MacKay b. 1936 first elected in 1971 as Progressive Conservative member for Central Nova, Nova Scotia.
- Newton LeGayet Mackay b. 1832 first elected in 1872 as Conservative member for Cape Breton, Nova Scotia.
- Peter MacKay b. 1965 first elected in 1997 as Progressive Conservative member for Pictou—Antigonish—Guysborough, Nova Scotia.
- David MacKeen b. 1839 first elected in 1887 as Conservative member for Cape Breton, Nova Scotia.
- John Armstrong MacKelvie b. 1865 first elected in 1920 as Conservative member for Yale, British Columbia.
- Alexander Mackenzie b. 1822 first elected in 1867 as Liberal member for Lambton, Ontario.
- Dave MacKenzie b. 1947 first elected in 2004 as Conservative member for Oxford, Ontario.
- Frederick Mackenzie b. 1841 first elected in 1874 as Liberal member for Montreal West, Quebec.
- Frederick Donald MacKenzie b. 1882 first elected in 1935 as Liberal member for Neepawa, Manitoba.
- Hugh Alexander MacKenzie b. 1882 first elected in 1935 as Liberal member for Lambton—Kent, Ontario.
- Ian Alistair Mackenzie b. 1890 first elected in 1930 as Liberal member for Vancouver Centre, British Columbia.
- Henry Arthur Mackie b. 1878 first elected in 1917 as Unionist member for Edmonton East, Alberta.
- Herbert John Mackie b. 1876 first elected in 1917 as Unionist member for Renfrew North, Ontario.
- Thomas Mackie b. 1840 first elected in 1896 as Liberal member for Renfrew North, Ontario.
- Donald Alexander MacKinnon b. 1863 first elected in 1900 as Liberal member for East Queen's, Prince Edward Island.
- George Ernest Lawson MacKinnon b. 1879 first elected in 1940 as National Government member for Kootenay East, British Columbia.
- James Angus MacKinnon b. 1881 first elected in 1935 as Liberal member for Edmonton West, Alberta.
- Steven MacKinnon b. 1966 first elected in 2015 as Liberal member for Gatineau, Quebec.
- Charles Herbert Mackintosh b. 1843 first elected in 1882 as Conservative member for City of Ottawa, Ontario.
- Paul Macklin b. 1944 first elected in 2000 as Liberal member for Northumberland, Ontario.

== Macl–Macw ==
- Alexander Ferguson MacLaren b. 1854 first elected in 1896 as Conservative member for Perth North, Ontario.
- Murray MacLaren b. 1861 first elected in 1921 as Conservative member for St. John—Albert, New Brunswick.
- Roy MacLaren b. 1934 first elected in 1979 as Liberal member for Etobicoke North, Ontario.
- William Scott MacLaren b. 1845 first elected in 1900 as Liberal member for Huntingdon, Quebec.
- Alexander Kenneth Maclean b. 1869 first elected in 1904 as Liberal member for Lunenburg, Nova Scotia.
- Alfred Edgar MacLean b. 1868 first elected in 1921 as Liberal member for Prince, Prince Edward Island.
- John Angus MacLean b. 1914 first elected in 1951 as Progressive Conservative member for Queen's, Prince Edward Island.
- John Douglas Campbell MacLean b. 1929 first elected in 1958 as Progressive Conservative member for Winnipeg North Centre, Manitoba.
- Matthew MacLean b. 1879 first elected in 1937 as Liberal member for Cape Breton North and Victoria, Nova Scotia.
- William Findlay Maclean b. 1854 first elected in 1892 as Conservative member for York East, Ontario.
- Angus MacLennan b. 1844 first elected in 1896 as Liberal member for Inverness, Nova Scotia.
- Robert Simpson MacLellan b. 1925 first elected in 1958 as Progressive Conservative member for Inverness—Richmond, Nova Scotia.
- Russell MacLellan b. 1940 first elected in 1979 as Liberal member for Cape Breton—The Sydneys, Nova Scotia.
- Donald MacLennan b. 1877 first elected in 1935 as Liberal member for Inverness—Richmond, Nova Scotia.
- James Maclennan b. 1833 first elected in 1874 as Liberal member for Victoria North, Ontario.
- Donald Macmaster b. 1846 first elected in 1882 as Conservative member for Glengarry, Ontario.
- Cyrus Macmillan b. 1882 first elected in 1940 as Liberal member for Queen's, Prince Edward Island.
- Duncan Macmillan b. 1837 first elected in 1875 as Liberal-Conservative member for Middlesex East, Ontario.
- Frank MacMillan b. 1882 first elected in 1930 as Conservative member for Saskatoon, Saskatchewan.
- John Angus MacMillan b. 1889 first elected in 1933 as Liberal member for Mackenzie, Saskatchewan.
- John Watson MacNaught b. 1904 first elected in 1945 as Liberal member for Prince, Prince Edward Island.
- Alan Aylesworth Macnaughton b. 1903 first elected in 1949 as Liberal member for Mount Royal, Quebec.
- Charles Grant MacNeil b. 1892 first elected in 1935 as Cooperative Commonwealth Federation member for Vancouver North, British Columbia.
- John Ritchie MacNicol b. 1878 first elected in 1930 as Conservative member for Toronto Northwest, Ontario.
- George Taylor MacNutt b. 1865 first elected in 1925 as Conservative member for Colchester, Nova Scotia.
- Thomas MacNutt b. 1850 first elected in 1908 as Liberal member for Saltcoats, Saskatchewan.
- Agnes Macphail b. 1890 first elected in 1921 as Progressive member for Grey Southeast, Ontario.
- Robert George Macpherson b. 1866 first elected in 1903 as Liberal member for Burrard, British Columbia.
- Thomas Henry Macpherson b. 1842 first elected in 1896 as Liberal member for Hamilton, Ontario.
- Heath MacQuarrie b. 1919 first elected in 1957 as Progressive Conservative member for Queen's, Prince Edward Island.
- John Chester MacRae b. 1912 first elected in 1957 as Progressive Conservative member for York—Sunbury, New Brunswick.
- John David MacRae b. 1876 first elected in 1935 as Liberal member for Glengarry, Ontario.
- Lyle MacWilliam b. 1949 first elected in 1988 as New Democratic Party member for Okanagan—Shuswap, British Columbia.

== Mad–Maj ==
- James William Maddin b. 1874 first elected in 1908 as Liberal-Conservative member for Cape Breton South, Nova Scotia.
- Frank Madill b. 1852 first elected in 1887 as Conservative member for Ontario North, Ontario.
- John Ellwood Madill b. 1915 first elected in 1963 as Progressive Conservative member for Dufferin—Simcoe, Ontario.
- Joseph Alexandre Camille Madore b. 1858 first elected in 1896 as Liberal member for Hochelaga, Quebec.
- Charles Magill b. 1816 first elected in 1867 as Liberal member for Hamilton, Ontario.
- Charles Alexander Magrath b. 1860 first elected in 1908 as Conservative member for Medicine Hat, Alberta.
- Larry Maguire b. 1949 first elected in 2013 as Conservative member for Brandon—Souris, Manitoba.
- Jagsharan Singh Mahal first elected in 2025 as Conservative member for Edmonton Southeast, Alberta.
- John Archibald Maharg b. 1872 first elected in 1917 as Unionist member for Maple Creek, Saskatchewan.
- Shirley Maheu b. 1931 first elected in 1988 as Liberal member for Saint-Laurent, Quebec.
- Pat Mahoney b. 1929 first elected in 1968 as Liberal member for Calgary South, Alberta.
- Steve Mahoney b. 1947 first elected in 1997 as Liberal member for Mississauga West, Ontario.
- Hoang Mai b. 1973 first elected in 2011 as New Democratic Party member for Brossard—La Prairie, Quebec.
- Élie Mailloux b. 1830 first elected in 1872 as Conservative member for Témiscouata, Quebec.
- Claudy Mailly b. 1938 first elected in 1984 as Progressive Conservative member for Gatineau, Quebec.
- Francis William Maine b. 1937 first elected in 1974 as Liberal member for Wellington, Ontario.
- Charles Beautrom Major b. 1851 first elected in 1907 as Liberal member for Labelle, Quebec.
- Robert Benoit Major b. 1915 first elected in 1968 as Liberal member for Argenteuil, Quebec.
- William Joseph Major b. 1896 first elected in 1949 as Liberal member for Glengarry, Ontario.
- Shuvaloy Majumdar first elected in 2023 as Conservative member for Calgary Heritage, Quebec.

== Mal–Man ==
- James Malcolm b. 1880 first elected in 1921 as Liberal member for Bruce North, Ontario.
- Sheila Malcolmson b. 1966 first elected in 2015 as New Democratic Party member for Nanaimo—Ladysmith, British Columbia.
- Jean-Claude Malépart b. 1938 first elected in 1979 as Liberal member for Sainte-Marie, Quebec.
- Chris Malette first elected in 2025 as Liberal member for Bay of Quinte, Ontario.
- Gaétan Malette first elected in 2025 as Conservative member for Kapuskasing—Timmins—Mushkegowuk, Ontario.
- Gurbax Singh Malhi b. 1949 first elected in 1993 as Liberal member for Bramalea—Gore—Malton, Ontario.
- Joseph Léon Vital Mallette b. 1888 first elected in 1935 as Liberal member for Jacques Cartier, Quebec.
- Albert Elhanon Mallory b. 1848 first elected in 1887 as Liberal member for Northumberland East, Ontario.
- Luc Malo b. 1973 first elected in 2006 as Bloc Québécois member for Verchères—Les Patriotes, Quebec.
- Arnold John Malone b. 1937 first elected in 1974 as Progressive Conservative member for Battle River, Alberta.
- Arthur Edward Martin Maloney b. 1919 first elected in 1957 as Progressive Conservative member for Parkdale, Ontario.
- James Maloney b. 1964 first elected in 2015 as Liberal member for Etobicoke—Lakeshore, Ontario.
- John Maloney b. 1945 first elected in 1993 as Liberal member for Erie, Ontario.
- John William Maloney b. 1884 first elected in 1945 as Liberal member for Northumberland, New Brunswick.
- Martin James Maloney b. 1877 first elected in 1925 as Conservative member for Renfrew South, Ontario.
- Arthur Cyrille Albert Malouin b. 1857 first elected in 1898 as Liberal member for Quebec-Centre, Quebec.
- Jacques Malouin b. 1826 first elected in 1877 as Independent member for Quebec-Centre, Quebec.
- Jim Maloway b. 1952 first elected in 2008 as New Democratic member for Elmwood—Transcona, Manitoba.
- André Maltais b. 1948 first elected in 1979 as Liberal member for Manicouagan, Quebec.
- Auguste Maltais b. 1916 first elected in 1949 as Liberal member for Charlevoix, Quebec.
- Lauréat Maltais b. 1923 first elected in 1962 as Social Credit member for Saguenay, Quebec.
- Peter Mancini b. 1956 first elected in 1997 as New Democratic Party member for Sydney—Victoria, Nova Scotia.
- Nick Mandziuk b. 1902 first elected in 1957 as Progressive Conservative member for Marquette, Manitoba.
- Henry Philip Mang b. 1897 first elected in 1953 as Liberal member for Qu'Appelle, Saskatchewan.
- Robert James Manion b. 1881 first elected in 1917 as Unionist member for Fort William and Rainy River, Ontario.
- John Manley b. 1950 first elected in 1988 as Liberal member for Ottawa South, Ontario.
- James Douglas Manly b. 1932 first elected in 1980 as New Democratic Party member for Cowichan—Malahat—The Islands, British Columbia.
- Paul Manly b. 1964 first elected in 2019 as Green member for Nanaimo—Ladysmith, British Columbia.
- Fabian Manning b. 1964 first elected in 2006 as Conservative member for Avalon, Newfoundland and Labrador
- Preston Manning b. 1942 first elected in 1993 as Reform member for Calgary Southwest, Alberta.
- Park Manross b. 1895 first elected in 1945 as Progressive Conservative member for London, Ontario.
- David Ames Manson b. 1841 first elected in 1880 as Liberal-Conservative member for Brome, Quebec.
- Moe Mantha b. 1933 first elected in 1984 as Progressive Conservative member for Nipissing, Ontario.
- Jacob Mantle first elected in 2025 as Conservative member for York—Durham, Ontario.

== Mara–Mars ==
- John Andrew Mara b. 1840 first elected in 1887 as Conservative member for Yale, British Columbia.
- Gilles Marceau b. 1928 first elected in 1968 as Liberal member for Lapointe, Quebec.
- Richard Marceau b. 1970 first elected in 1997 as Bloc Québécois member for Charlesbourg, Quebec.
- Jean Marchand b. 1918 first elected in 1965 as Liberal member for Quebec West, Quebec.
- Jean-Paul Marchand b. 1944 first elected in 1993 as Bloc Québécois member for Québec-Est, Quebec.
- Leonard Marchand b. 1933 first elected in 1968 as Liberal member for Kamloops—Cariboo, British Columbia.
- Sergio Marchi b. 1956 first elected in 1984 as Liberal member for York West, Ontario.
- Charles Marcil b. 1860 first elected in 1900 as Liberal member for Bonaventure, Quebec.
- Serge Marcil b. 1944 first elected in 2000 as Liberal member for Beauharnois—Salaberry, Quebec.
- Simon Marcil first elected in 2015 as Bloc Québécois member for Mirabel, Quebec.
- Joseph Edmond Marcile b. 1854 first elected in 1898 as Liberal member for Bagot, Quebec.
- François Arthur Marcotte b. 1866 first elected in 1896 as Conservative member for Champlain, Quebec.
- Guy Marcoux b. 1924 first elected in 1962 as Social Credit member for Québec—Montmorency, Quebec.
- Elphège Marier b. 1888 first elected in 1939 as Liberal member for Jacques Cartier, Quebec.
- Charles-Eugène Marin b. 1925 first elected in 1984 as Progressive Conservative member for Gaspé, Quebec.
- Inky Mark b. 1947 first elected in 1997 as Reform member for Dauphin—Swan River, Manitoba.
- Diane Marleau b. 1943 first elected in 1988 as Liberal member for Sudbury, Ontario.
- George Carlyle Marler b. 1901 first elected in 1954 as Liberal member for Saint-Antoine—Westmount, Quebec.
- Herbert Meredith Marler b. 1876 first elected in 1921 as Liberal member for St. Lawrence—St. George, Quebec.
- Eugène Marquis b. 1901 first elected in 1945 as Liberal member for Kamouraska, Quebec.
- John Allmond Marsh b. 1894 first elected in 1937 as Conservative member for Hamilton West, Ontario.
- David Marshall b. 1846 first elected in 1906 as Conservative member for Elgin East, Ontario.
- Jack Marshall b. 1919 first elected in 1968 as Progressive Conservative member for Humber—St. George's—St. Barbe, Newfoundland and Labrador.
- James Alexander Marshall b. 1888 first elected in 1935 as Social Credit member for Camrose, Alberta.
- Joseph Henry Marshall b. 1854 first elected in 1887 as Conservative member for Middlesex East, Ontario.
- Wayne Marston b. 1947 first elected in 2006 as New Democratic Party member for Hamilton East—Stoney Creek, Ontario.

== Mart ==
- Jean-Jacques Martel b. 1927 first elected in 1958 as Progressive Conservative member for Chapleau, Quebec.
- Lewis Herbert Martell b. 1885 first elected in 1921 as Liberal member for Hants, Nova Scotia.
- Richard Martel b. 1961 first elected in 2018 as Conservative member for Chicoutimi—Le Fjord, Quebec.
- Alan Gray Martin b. 1930 first elected in 1974 as Liberal member for Scarborough West, Ontario.
- Alexander Martin b. 1842 first elected in 1896 as Conservative member for East Queen's, Prince Edward Island.
- Alexander Munro Martin b. 1852 first elected in 1907 as Liberal member for Wellington North, Ontario.
- Danielle Martin first elected in 2026 as Liberal member for University—Rosedale, Ontario.
- Joseph Martin b. 1852 first elected in 1893 as Liberal member for Winnipeg, Manitoba.
- Keith Martin b. 1960 first elected in 1993 as Reform member for Esquimalt—Juan de Fuca, British Columbia.
- Médéric Martin b. 1869 first elected in 1906 as Liberal member for St. Mary, Quebec.
- Murdo Martin b. 1917 first elected in 1957 as Cooperative Commonwealth Federation member for Timmins, Ontario.
- Pat Martin b. 1955 first elected in 1997 as New Democratic Party member for Winnipeg Centre, Manitoba.
- Paul Martin b. 1938 first elected in 1988 as Liberal member for LaSalle—Émard, Quebec.
- Paul Martin Sr. b. 1903 first elected in 1935 as Liberal member for Essex East, Ontario.
- Peter Francis Martin b. 1856 first elected in 1917 as Unionist member for Halifax, Nova Scotia.
- Shirley Martin b. 1932 first elected in 1984 as Progressive Conservative member for Lincoln, Ontario.
- Thomas Martin b. 1850 first elected in 1904 as Liberal member for Wellington North, Ontario.
- Tony Martin b. 1948 first elected in 2004 as New Democratic Party member for Sault Ste. Marie, Ontario.
- William Melville Martin b. 1876 first elected in 1908 as Liberal member for Regina, Saskatchewan.
- Paul Raymond Martineau b. 1921 first elected in 1958 as Progressive Conservative member for Pontiac—Témiscamingue, Quebec.
- Pierre-Raymond-Léonard Martineau b. 1857 first elected in 1898 as Liberal member for Montmagny, Quebec.
- Soraya Martinez Ferrada b. 1972 first elected in 2015 as Liberal member for Hochelaga, Quebec.
- Quinto Martini b. 1908 first elected in 1957 as Progressive Conservative member for Hamilton East, Ontario.

== Mas ==
- Peter Masniuk b. 1920 first elected in 1972 as Progressive Conservative member for Portage, Manitoba.
- Arthur Massé b. 1894 first elected in 1949 as Independent Liberal member for Kamouraska, Quebec.
- Brian Masse b. 1968 first elected in 2002 as New Democratic Party member for Windsor West, Ontario.
- Marcel Masse b. 1936 first elected in 1984 as Progressive Conservative member for Frontenac, Quebec.
- Marcel Massé b. 1940 first elected in 1993 as Liberal member for Hull—Aylmer, Quebec.
- Paul-André Massé b. 1941 first elected in 1979 as Liberal member for Saint-Jean, Quebec.
- Rémi Massé first elected in 2015 as Liberal member for Avignon—La Mitis—Matane—Matapédia, Quebec.
- Denton Massey b. 1900 first elected in 1935 as Conservative member for Greenwood, Ontario.
- James Masson b. 1847 first elected in 1887 as Conservative member for Grey North, Ontario.
- Louis-François-Rodrigue Masson b. 1833 first elected in 1867 as Conservative member for Terrebonne, Quebec.
- Luc Hyacinthe Masson b. 1811 first elected in 1867 as Conservative member for Soulanges, Quebec.
- Joseph-Aimé Massue b. 1860 first elected in 1887 as Conservative member for Richelieu, Quebec.
- Louis Huet Massue b. 1828 first elected in 1878 as Liberal-Conservative member for Richelieu, Quebec.
- Jack Masters b. 1931 first elected in 1980 as Liberal member for Thunder Bay—Nipigon, Ontario.

== Mat–Maz ==
- Barry Mather b. 1909 first elected in 1962 as New Democratic Party member for New Westminster, British Columbia.
- John Ross Matheson b. 1917 first elected in 1961 as Liberal member for Leeds, Ontario.
- Joseph Matheson b. 1833 first elected in 1900 as Liberal member for Richmond, Nova Scotia.
- Neil Alexander Matheson b. 1904 first elected in 1953 as Liberal member for Queen's, Prince Edward Island.
- Michel Mathieu b. 1838 first elected in 1872 as Conservative member for Richelieu, Quebec.
- Irene Mathyssen b. 1951 first elected in 2006 as New Democratic Party member for London—Fanshawe, Ontario.
- Lindsay Mathyssen first elected in 2019 as New Democratic Party member for London—Fanshawe, Ontario.
- Jean-Paul Matte b. 1914 first elected in 1962 as Liberal member for Champlain, Quebec.
- René Matte b. 1935 first elected in 1968 as Ralliement Créditiste member for Champlain, Quebec.
- Bill Matthews b. 1947 first elected in 1997 as Progressive Conservative member for Burin—St. George's, Newfoundland and Labrador.
- James Ewen Matthews b. 1869 first elected in 1938 as Liberal member for Brandon, Manitoba.
- James Herbert Matthews b. 1883 first elected in 1945 as Cooperative Commonwealth Federation member for Kootenay East, British Columbia.
- Robert Charles Matthews b. 1871 first elected in 1926 as Conservative member for Toronto East Centre, Ontario.
- Walter Franklyn Matthews b. 1900 first elected in 1958 as Progressive Conservative member for Nanaimo, British Columbia.
- George Ritchie Maxwell b. 1857 first elected in 1896 as Liberal member for Burrard, British Columbia.
- Bryan May b. 1974 first elected in 2015 as Liberal member for Cambridge, Ontario.
- Elizabeth May b. 1954 first elected in 2011 as Green member for Saanich—Gulf Islands, British Columbia.
- Ralph Maybank b. 1890 first elected in 1935 as Liberal member for Winnipeg South Centre, Manitoba.
- Milton Edgar Maybee b. 1872 first elected in 1921 as Conservative member for Northumberland, Ontario.
- Charles James Mayer b. 1936 first elected in 1979 as Progressive Conservative member for Portage—Marquette, Manitoba.
- Colin Mayes b. 1948 first elected in 2006 as Conservative member for Okanagan—Shuswap, British Columbia.
- Philip Mayfield b. 1937 first elected in 1993 as Reform member for Cariboo—Chilcotin, British Columbia.
- Robert Wellington Mayhew b. 1880 first elected in 1937 as Liberal member for Victoria, British Columbia.
- Hormidas Mayrand b. 1858 first elected in 1903 as Liberal member for Maskinongé, Quebec.
- Don Mazankowski b. 1935 first elected in 1968 as Progressive Conservative member for Vegreville, Alberta.
- Dan Mazier first elected in 2019 as Conservative member for Dauphin—Swan River—Neepawa, Manitoba.

== Mca–Mcb ==
- John McAdam b. 1807 first elected in 1872 as Liberal-Conservative member for Charlotte, New Brunswick.
- Duncan Hamilton McAlister b. 1872 first elected in 1908 as Liberal member for King's and Albert, New Brunswick.
- John McAlister b. 1842 first elected in 1891 as Liberal-Conservative member for Restigouche, New Brunswick.
- Allan Getchell McAvity b. 1882 first elected in 1938 as Liberal member for St. John—Albert, New Brunswick.
- James Alexander McBain b. 1910 first elected in 1954 as Progressive Conservative member for Elgin, Ontario.
- Murray Arndell McBride b. 1935 first elected in 1968 as Liberal member for Lanark and Renfrew, Ontario.
- Thomas George McBride b. 1867 first elected in 1921 as Progressive member for Cariboo, British Columbia.

== Mcca–Mcco ==
- Fred Alward McCain b. 1917 first elected in 1972 as Progressive Conservative member for Carleton—Charlotte, New Brunswick.
- Alexander McCall b. 1844 first elected in 1908 as Conservative member for Norfolk, Ontario.
- Angus Neil McCallum b. 1892 first elected in 1937 as Liberal member for Frontenac—Addington, Ontario.
- John McCallum b. 1950 first elected in 2000 as Liberal member for Markham, Ontario.
- Lachlan McCallum b. 1823 first elected in 1867 as Liberal-Conservative member for Monck, Ontario.
- James Joseph McCann b. 1887 first elected in 1935 as Liberal member for Renfrew South, Ontario.
- D'Alton McCarthy b. 1836 first elected in 1876 as Conservative member for Cardwell, Ontario.
- Leighton Goldie McCarthy b. 1869 first elected in 1898 as Independent member for Simcoe North, Ontario.
- Maitland Stewart McCarthy b. 1872 first elected in 1904 as Conservative member for Calgary, Northwest Territories.
- Thomas McCarthy b. 1832 first elected in 1867 as Conservative member for Richelieu, Quebec.
- Gary Francis McCauley b. 1940 first elected in 1979 as Liberal member for Moncton, New Brunswick.
- Kelly McCauley b. 1964 first elected in 2015 as Conservative member for Edmonton West, Alberta.
- William McCleary b. 1853 first elected in 1896 as Conservative member for Welland, Ontario.
- Robert Jardine McCleave b. 1922 first elected in 1957 as Progressive Conservative member for Halifax, Nova Scotia.
- Ian McClelland b. 1942 first elected in 1993 as Reform member for Edmonton Southwest, Alberta.
- Stewart McClenaghan b. 1867 first elected in 1925 as Conservative member for City of Ottawa, Ontario.
- Firman McClure b. 1861 first elected in 1897 as Liberal member for Colchester, Nova Scotia.
- Archibald Blake McCoig b. 1873 first elected in 1908 as Liberal member for Kent West, Ontario.
- John B. McColl b. 1861 first elected in 1900 as Liberal member for Northumberland West, Ontario.
- Phil McColeman b. 1954 first elected in 2008 as Conservative member for Brant, Ontario.
- Thomas Henry McConica b. 1855 first elected in 1921 as Progressive member for Battleford, Saskatchewan.
- Thomas David McConkey b. 1815 first elected in 1867 as Liberal member for Simcoe North, Ontario.
- Lewis Arthur McConville b. 1849 first elected in 1880 as Conservative member for Joliette, Quebec.
- Charles Arthur McCool b. 1853 first elected in 1900 as Liberal member for Nipissing, Ontario.
- George McCormick b. 1856 first elected in 1896 as Liberal-Conservative member for Muskoka and Parry Sound, Ontario.
- Larry McCormick b. 1940 first elected in 1993 as Liberal member for Hastings—Frontenac—Lennox and Addington, Ontario.

== Mccr–Mccu ==
- George Ewan McCraney b. 1868 first elected in 1906 as Liberal member for Saskatchewan, Saskatchewan.
- William McCraney b. 1831 first elected in 1875 as Liberal member for Halton, Ontario.
- Francis McCrea b. 1852 first elected in 1911 as Liberal member for Town of Sherbrooke, Quebec.
- William Forsythe McCreary b. 1855 first elected in 1900 as Liberal member for Selkirk, Manitoba.
- Peter L. McCreath b. 1943 first elected in 1988 as Progressive Conservative member for South Shore, Nova Scotia.
- Karen McCrimmon b. 1959 first elected in 2015 as Liberal member for Kanata—Carleton, Ontario.
- William Paul Joseph McCrossan b. 1942 first elected in 1978 as Progressive Conservative member for York—Scarborough, Ontario.
- Duncan Fletcher McCuaig b. 1889 first elected in 1935 as Liberal member for Simcoe North, Ontario.
- Duncan John McCuaig b. 1882 first elected in 1945 as Cooperative Commonwealth Federation member for Maple Creek, Saskatchewan.
- James Simeon McCuaig b. 1819 first elected in 1878 as Conservative member for Prince Edward, Ontario.
- Robert McCubbin b. 1902 first elected in 1940 as Liberal member for Middlesex West, Ontario.
- Robert Lorne McCuish b. 1923 first elected in 1979 as Progressive Conservative member for Prince George—Bulkley Valley, British Columbia.
- William Armstrong McCulla b. 1837 first elected in 1887 as Conservative member for Peel, Ontario.
- Henry Byron McCulloch b. 1877 first elected in 1935 as Liberal member for Pictou, Nova Scotia.
- Edward George McCullough b. 1909 first elected in 1945 as Cooperative Commonwealth Federation member for Assiniboia, Saskatchewan.
- Fleming Blanchard McCurdy b. 1875 first elected in 1911 as Conservative member for Shelburne and Queen's, Nova Scotia.
- Howard McCurdy b. 1932 first elected in 1984 as New Democratic Party member for Windsor—Walkerville, Ontario.
- Emmett Andrew McCusker b. 1889 first elected in 1949 as Liberal member for Regina City, Saskatchewan.
- Maclyn McCutcheon b. 1912 first elected in 1963 as Progressive Conservative member for Lambton—Kent, Ontario.

== Mcd–Mcf ==
- George Manning McDade b. 1893 first elected in 1930 as Conservative member for Northumberland, New Brunswick.
- Sydney Smith McDermand b. 1868 first elected in 1920 as United Farmers of Ontario member for Elgin East, Ontario.
- John Horton McDermid b. 1940 first elected in 1979 as Progressive Conservative member for Brampton—Georgetown, Ontario.
- John Stewart McDiarmid b. 1882 first elected in 1926 as Liberal member for Winnipeg South, Manitoba.
- Angus McDonald b. 1867 first elected in 1920 as Independent member for Timiskaming, Ontario.
- Angus Peter McDonald b. 1813 first elected in 1867 as Conservative member for Middlesex West, Ontario.
- Charles McDonald b. 1867 first elected in 1925 as Liberal member for Prince Albert, Saskatchewan.
- Duncan McDonald b. 1839 first elected in 1878 as Liberal member for Victoria, Nova Scotia.
- Edmund Mortimer McDonald b. 1825 first elected in 1867 as Anti-Confederate member for Lunenburg, Nova Scotia.
- George William McDonald b. 1875 first elected in 1935 as Liberal-Progressive member for Souris, Manitoba.
- Hugh McDonald b. 1827 first elected in 1867 as Anti-Confederate member for Antigonish, Nova Scotia.
- James McDonald b. 1828 first elected in 1872 as Conservative member for Pictou, Nova Scotia.
- John Archibald McDonald b. 1851 first elected in 1887 as Conservative member for Victoria, Nova Scotia.
- Ken McDonald b. 1959 first elected in 2015 as Liberal member for Avalon, Newfoundland and Labrador.
- Lynn McDonald b. 1940 first elected in 1982 as New Democratic Party member for Broadview—Greenwood, Ontario.
- Robert Matthew Turnbull McDonald b. 1931 first elected in 1957 as Progressive Conservative member for Hamilton South, Ontario.
- Wallace Reginald McDonald b. 1876 first elected in 1935 as Liberal member for Pontiac, Quebec.
- Wilfred Kennedy "Bucko" McDonald b. 1911 first elected in 1945 as Liberal member for Parry Sound, Ontario.
- William McDonald b. 1837 first elected in 1872 as Conservative member for Cape Breton, Nova Scotia.
- William Walter McDonald b. 1844 first elected in 1892 as Conservative member for Assiniboia East, Northwest Territories.
- Samuel McDonnell b. 1834 first elected in 1872 as Conservative member for Inverness, Nova Scotia.
- Alexa McDonough b. 1944 first elected in 1997 as New Democratic Party member for Halifax, Nova Scotia.
- John McDougald b. 1848 first elected in 1881 as Liberal-Conservative member for Pictou, Nova Scotia.
- Barbara McDougall b. 1937 first elected in 1984 as Progressive Conservative member for St. Paul's, Ontario.
- Hector Francis McDougall b. 1848 first elected in 1884 as Liberal-Conservative member for Cape Breton, Nova Scotia.
- John Lorn McDougall b. 1838 first elected in 1869 as Liberal member for Renfrew South, Ontario.
- William McDougall b. 1831 first elected in 1868 as Conservative member for Three Rivers, Quebec.
- William McDougall b. 1822 first elected in 1867 as Liberal-Conservative member for Lanark North, Ontario.
- George McEwen b. 1849 first elected in 1900 as Liberal member for Huron South, Ontario.
- Murray Lincoln McFarlane b. 1908 first elected in 1958 as Progressive Conservative member for Kootenay East, British Columbia.

== Mcg–Mch ==
- Moses Elijah McGarry b. 1878 first elected in 1940 as Liberal member for Inverness—Richmond, Nova Scotia.
- Frank Charles McGee b. 1926 first elected in 1957 as Progressive Conservative member for York—Scarborough, Ontario.
- Thomas D'Arcy McGee b. 1825 first elected in 1867 as Liberal-Conservative member for Montreal West, Quebec.
- Gerald Grattan McGeer b. 1888 first elected in 1935 as Liberal member for Vancouver—Burrard, British Columbia.
- James Wright McGibbon b. 1901 first elected in 1940 as Liberal member for Argenteuil, Quebec.
- Peter McGibbon b. 1873 first elected in 1917 as Unionist member for Muskoka, Ontario.
- Peter Robert McGibbon b. 1854 first elected in 1917 as Laurier Liberal member for Argenteuil, Quebec.
- Angus McGillis b. 1874 first elected in 1930 as Conservative member for Glengarry, Ontario.
- John Alexander McGillivray b. 1853 first elected in 1895 as Liberal-Conservative member for Ontario North, Ontario.
- Harold Buchanan McGiverin b. 1870 first elected in 1908 as Liberal member for City of Ottawa, Ontario.
- John McGowan b. 1845 first elected in 1900 as Liberal-Conservative member for Wellington Centre, Ontario.
- James Aloysius McGrath b. 1932 first elected in 1957 as Progressive Conservative member for St. John's East, Newfoundland and Labrador.
- Thomas McGreevy b. 1825 first elected in 1867 as Liberal-Conservative member for Quebec West, Quebec.
- Alexander McGregor b. 1864 first elected in 1917 as Unionist member for Pictou, Nova Scotia.
- Robert Henry McGregor b. 1886 first elected in 1926 as Conservative member for York South, Ontario.
- William McGregor b. 1836 first elected in 1874 as Liberal member for Essex, Ontario.
- Malcolm McGugan b. 1846 first elected in 1896 as Liberal member for Middlesex South, Ontario.
- David J. McGuinty b. 1960 first elected in 2004 as Liberal member for Ottawa South, Ontario.
- Joseph Blair McGuire b. 1944 first elected in 1988 as Liberal member for Egmont, Prince Edward Island.
- George McHugh b. 1845 first elected in 1896 as Liberal member for Victoria South, Ontario.

== Mci ==
- George James McIlraith b. 1908 first elected in 1940 as Liberal member for Ottawa West, Ontario.
- George Valentine McInerney b. 1857 first elected in 1892 as Liberal-Conservative member for Kent, New Brunswick.
- Stewart Donald McInnes b. 1937 first elected in 1984 as Progressive Conservative member for Halifax, Nova Scotia.
- Thomas Robert McInnes b. 1840 first elected in 1878 as Independent member for New Westminster, British Columbia.
- William Wallace Burns McInnes b. 1871 first elected in 1896 as Liberal member for Vancouver, British Columbia.
- Cameron Ross McIntosh b. 1871 first elected in 1925 as Liberal member for North Battleford, Saskatchewan.
- John McIntosh b. 1841 first elected in 1900 as Conservative member for Town of Sherbrooke, Quebec.
- John McIntosh b. 1909 first elected in 1958 as Progressive Conservative member for Swift Current—Maple Creek, Saskatchewan.
- John Charles McIntosh b. 1874 first elected in 1917 as Unionist member for Nanaimo, British Columbia.
- Gilbert Howard McIntyre b. 1852 first elected in 1904 as Liberal member for Perth South, Ontario.
- Peter Adolphus McIntyre b. 1840 first elected in 1874 as Liberal member for King's County, Prince Edward Island.
- Wilbert McIntyre b. 1867 first elected in 1906 as Liberal member for Strathcona, Alberta.
- Angus McIsaac b. 1842 first elected in 1873 as Liberal member for Antigonish, Nova Scotia.
- Colin Francis McIsaac b. 1854 first elected in 1895 as Liberal member for Antigonish, Nova Scotia.
- James McIsaac b. 1854 first elected in 1917 as Unionist member for King's, Prince Edward Island.
- Joseph Clifford McIsaac b. 1930 first elected in 1974 as Liberal member for Battleford—Kindersley, Saskatchewan.
- Daniel McIvor b. 1873 first elected in 1935 as Liberal member for Fort William, Ontario.

== Mck ==
- Alexander McKay b. 1843 first elected in 1887 as Conservative member for Hamilton, Ontario.
- Angus McKay b. 1836 first elected in 1871 as Conservative member for Marquette, Manitoba.
- Eric Bowness McKay b. 1899 first elected in 1945 as Cooperative Commonwealth Federation member for Weyburn, Saskatchewan.
- James McKay b. 1862 first elected in 1911 as Conservative member for Prince Albert, Saskatchewan.
- John McKay b. 1948 first elected in 1997 as Liberal member for Scarborough East, Ontario.
- Matthew McKay b. 1858 first elected in 1921 as Liberal member for Renfrew North, Ontario.
- Thomas McKay b. 1839 first elected in 1874 as Liberal-Conservative member for Colchester, Nova Scotia.
- James Charles McKeagney b. 1815 first elected in 1867 as Anti-Confederate member for Cape Breton, Nova Scotia.
- Jennifer McKelvie b. 1977 first elected in 2025 as Liberal member for Ajax, Ontario.
- Catherine McKenna b. 1971 first elected in 2015 as Liberal member for Ottawa Centre, Ontario.
- A. Daniel McKenzie b. 1924 first elected in 1972 as Progressive Conservative member for Winnipeg South Centre, Manitoba.
- Daniel Duncan McKenzie b. 1859 first elected in 1904 as Liberal member for North Cape Breton and Victoria, Nova Scotia.
- David McKenzie first elected in 2025 as Conservative member for Calgary Signal Hill, Alberta.
- Peter H. McKenzie b. 1845 first elected in 1904 as Liberal member for Bruce South, Ontario.
- Robert McKenzie b. 1875 first elected in 1925 as Liberal member for Assiniboia, Saskatchewan.
- Hugh Cummings McKillop b. 1872 first elected in 1921 as Conservative member for Elgin West, Ontario.
- Robert Elgin McKinley b. 1928 first elected in 1965 as Progressive Conservative member for Huron, Ontario.
- Allan McKinnon b. 1917 first elected in 1972 as Progressive Conservative member for Victoria, British Columbia.
- Glen McKinnon b. 1937 first elected in 1993 as Liberal member for Brandon—Souris, Manitoba.
- Hugh Bathgate McKinnon b. 1885 first elected in 1934 as Liberal member for Kenora—Rainy River, Ontario.
- Ron McKinnon b. 1951 first elected in 2015 as Liberal member for Coquitlam—Port Coquitlam, British Columbia.
- Jill McKnight first elected in 2025 as Liberal member for Delta, British Columbia.
- William Hunter McKnight b. 1940 first elected in 1979 as Progressive Conservative member for Kindersley—Lloydminster, Saskatchewan.

== Mcl ==
- Daniel McLachlin b. 1810 first elected in 1867 as Liberal member for Renfrew South, Ontario.
- Norman Alexander McLarty b. 1889 first elected in 1935 as Liberal member for Essex West, Ontario.
- Audrey McLaughlin b. 1936 first elected in 1987 as New Democratic Party member for Yukon, Yukon.
- Allan M.A. McLean b. 1891 first elected in 1962 as Liberal member for Charlotte, New Brunswick.
- Andrew Young McLean b. 1909 first elected in 1949 as Liberal member for Huron—Perth, Ontario.
- Angus Alexander McLean b. 1854 first elected in 1904 as Conservative member for Queen's, Prince Edward Island.
- George Alexander McLean b. 1885 first elected in 1935 as Liberal member for Simcoe East, Ontario.
- Greg McLean first elected in 2019 as Conservative member for Calgary Centre, Alberta.
- Hugh Havelock McLean b. 1854 first elected in 1908 as Liberal member for Sunbury—Queen's, New Brunswick.
- John McLean b. 1846 first elected in 1891 as Conservative member for King's County, Prince Edward Island.
- Malcolm McLean b. 1883 first elected in 1925 as Liberal member for Melfort, Saskatchewan.
- Michael Dalton McLean b. 1880 first elected in 1930 as Conservative member for Kootenay East, British Columbia.
- Murdo Young McLean b. 1848 first elected in 1908 as Liberal member for Huron South, Ontario.
- Peter Douglas McLean b. 1856 first elected in 1907 as Liberal member for York Centre, Ontario.
- Stephanie McLean b. 1987 first elected in 2025 as Liberal member for Esquimalt—Saanich—Sooke, British Columbia.
- Walter Franklin McLean b. 1936 first elected in 1979 as Progressive Conservative member for Waterloo, Ontario.
- Archibald McLelan b. 1824 first elected in 1867 as Anti-Confederate member for Colchester, Nova Scotia.
- Anne McLellan b. 1950 first elected in 1993 as Liberal member for Edmonton Northwest, Alberta.
- Bernard Donald McLellan b. 1859 first elected in 1898 as Liberal member for West Prince, Prince Edward Island.
- Ronald David McLelland b. 1926 first elected in 1965 as Progressive Conservative member for Rosetown—Biggar, Saskatchewan.
- John McLennan b. 1821 first elected in 1878 as Liberal-Conservative member for Glengarry, Ontario.
- Roderick R. McLennan b. 1842 first elected in 1891 as Conservative member for Glengarry, Ontario.
- William Alexander McLennan b. 1903 first elected in 1958 as Progressive Conservative member for New Westminster, British Columbia.
- Angus McLeod b. 1857 first elected in 1900 as Liberal-Conservative member for Ontario North, Ontario.
- Cathy McLeod b. 1957 first elected in 2008 as Conservative member for Kamloops—Thompson—Cariboo, Alberta.
- Ezekiel McLeod b. 1840 first elected in 1891 as Conservative member for City of St. John, New Brunswick.
- George McLeod b. 1836 first elected in 1874 as Independent member for Kent, New Brunswick.
- George William McLeod b. 1896 first elected in 1953 as Social Credit member for Okanagan—Revelstoke, British Columbia.
- Harry Fulton McLeod b. 1871 first elected in 1913 as Conservative member for York, New Brunswick.
- Hugh McLeod b. 1843 first elected in 1878 as Liberal-Conservative member for Cape Breton, Nova Scotia.
- Michael McLeod b. 1959 first elected in 2015 as Liberal member for Northwest Territories.
- William Mackenzie McLeod b. 1854 first elected in 1879 as Liberal-Conservative member for Cape Breton, Nova Scotia.
- Winfield Chester Scott McLure b. 1875 first elected in 1930 as Conservative member for Queen's, Prince Edward Island.

== Mcm–Mcn ==
- John McMartin b. 1870 first elected in 1917 as Unionist member for Glengarry and Stormont, Ontario.
- Andrew Ross McMaster b. 1876 first elected in 1917 as Laurier Liberal member for Brome, Quebec.
- William Alexander McMaster b. 1879 first elected in 1945 as Progressive Conservative member for High Park, Ontario.
- Donald McMillan b. 1807 first elected in 1867 as Conservative member for Vaudreuil, Quebec.
- Hugh McMillan b. 1839 first elected in 1882 as Conservative member for Vaudreuil, Quebec.
- John McMillan b. 1823 first elected in 1882 as Liberal member for Huron South, Ontario.
- John McMillan b. 1816 first elected in 1867 as Liberal member for Restigouche, New Brunswick.
- John Angus McMillan b. 1874 first elected in 1908 as Liberal member for Glengarry, Ontario.
- Thomas McMillan b. 1864 first elected in 1925 as Liberal member for Huron South, Ontario.
- Thomas McMillan b. 1945 first elected in 1979 as Progressive Conservative member for Hillsborough, Prince Edward Island.
- William Hector McMillan b. 1892 first elected in 1950 as Liberal member for Welland, Ontario.
- John Ernest McMillin b. 1884 first elected in 1949 as Progressive Conservative member for Greenwood, Ontario.
- James McMonies b. 1800 first elected in 1867 as Liberal member for Wentworth North, Ontario.
- James McMullen b. 1833 first elected in 1882 as Liberal member for Wellington North, Ontario.
- Edward James McMurray b. 1878 first elected in 1921 as Liberal member for Winnipeg North, Manitoba.
- Archibald McNab b. 1826 first elected in 1875 as Liberal member for Glengarry, Ontario.
- Grant McNally b. 1962 first elected in 1997 as Reform member for Dewdney—Alouette, British Columbia.
- Alexander McNeill b. 1842 first elected in 1882 as Liberal-Conservative member for Bruce North, Ontario.
- Thomas Bruce McNevin b. 1884 first elected in 1935 as Liberal member for Victoria, Ontario.
- Donald Alexander McNiven b. 1887 first elected in 1935 as Liberal member for Regina City, Saskatchewan.
- James McNulty b. 1918 first elected in 1962 as Liberal member for Lincoln, Ontario.

== Mcp–Mcw ==
- George Washington McPhee b. 1880 first elected in 1925 as Liberal member for Yorkton, Saskatchewan.
- Ewan McPherson b. 1878 first elected in 1926 as Liberal member for Portage la Prairie, Manitoba.
- Heather McPherson b. 1972 first elected in 2019 as New Democratic Party member for Edmonton Strathcona, Alberta.
- Albert DeBurgo McPhillips b. 1904 first elected in 1957 as Progressive Conservative member for Victoria, British Columbia.
- Arthur McQuade b. 1817 first elected in 1874 as Conservative member for Victoria South, Ontario.
- Melvin James McQuaid b. 1911 first elected in 1965 as Progressive Conservative member for King's, Prince Edward Island.
- William Garland McQuarrie b. 1876 first elected in 1917 as Unionist member for New Westminster, British Columbia.
- Henry Carwithen McQuillan b. 1906 first elected in 1958 as Progressive Conservative member for Comox—Alberni, British Columbia.
- Alexander Duncan McRae b. 1874 first elected in 1926 as Conservative member for Vancouver North, British Columbia.
- Paul Edmund McRae b. 1924 first elected in 1972 as Liberal member for Fort William, Ontario.
- John McRory b. 1834 first elected in 1878 as Conservative member for Addington, Ontario.
- James McShane b. 1833 first elected in 1895 as Liberal member for Montreal Centre, Quebec.
- Neil Haman McTaggart b. 1882 first elected in 1921 as Progressive member for Maple Creek, Saskatchewan.
- Dan McTeague b. 1962 first elected in 1993 as Liberal member for Ontario, Ontario.
- Edward Watson McWhinney b. 1924 first elected in 1993 as Liberal member for Vancouver Quadra, British Columbia.
- George Roy McWilliam b. 1905 first elected in 1949 as Liberal member for Northumberland, New Brunswick.

== Me ==
- Howie Meeker b. 1923 first elected in 1951 as Progressive Conservative member for Waterloo South, Ontario.
- Arthur Meighen b. 1874 first elected in 1908 as Conservative member for Portage la Prairie, Manitoba.
- Daniel Bishop Meigs b. 1835 first elected in 1888 as Liberal member for Missisquoi, Quebec.
- Eric Melillo b. 1998 first elected in 2019 as Conservative member for Kenora, Ontario.
- J.-Armand Ménard b. 1905 first elected in 1955 as Liberal member for Saint-Jean—Iberville—Napierville, Quebec.
- Marie-Gabrielle Ménard first elected in 2025 as Liberal member for Hochelaga—Rosemont-Est, Quebec.
- Réal Ménard b. 1962 first elected in 1993 as Bloc Québécois member for Hochelaga—Maisonneuve, Quebec.
- Serge Ménard b. 1941 first elected in 2004 as Bloc Québécois member for Marc-Aurèle-Fortin, Quebec.
- Lewis Menary b. 1882 first elected in 1945 as Progressive Conservative member for Wellington North, Ontario.
- Alexandra Mendès b. 1963 first elected in 2008 as Liberal member for Brossard—La Prairie, Quebec.
- Marco Mendicino b. 1973 first elected in 2015 as Liberal member for Eglinton—Lawrence, Ontario.
- Costas Menegakis b. 1959 first elected in 2011 as Conservative member for Richmond Hill, Ontario.
- Ted Menzies b. 1952 first elected in 2004 as Conservative member for Macleod, Alberta.
- Gary Merasty b. 1964 first elected in 2006 as Liberal member for Desnethé—Missinippi—Churchill River, Saskatchewan.
- Honoré Mercier b. 1840 first elected in 1872 as Liberal member for Rouville, Quebec.
- Joseph-Alexandre Mercier b. 1874 first elected in 1925 as Liberal member for Laurier—Outremont, Quebec.
- Paul Mercier b. 1924 first elected in 1993 as Bloc Québécois member for Blainville—Deux-Montagnes, Quebec.
- Paul Mercier b. 1888 first elected in 1921 as Liberal member for Westmount—St. Henri, Quebec.
- Val Meredith b. 1949 first elected in 1993 as Reform member for Surrey—White Rock—South Langley, British Columbia.
- Jonathan Joseph Merner b. 1864 first elected in 1911 as Conservative member for Huron South, Ontario.
- Samuel Merner b. 1823 first elected in 1878 as Conservative member for Waterloo South, Ontario.
- Rob Merrifield b. 1953 first elected in 2000 as Canadian Alliance member for Yellowhead, Alberta.
- Gerald Merrithew b. 1931 first elected in 1984 as Progressive Conservative member for Saint John, New Brunswick.
- Charles Cecil Ingersoll Merritt b. 1908 first elected in 1945 as Progressive Conservative member for Vancouver—Burrard, British Columbia.
- Thomas Rodman Merritt b. 1824 first elected in 1868 as Liberal member for Lincoln, Ontario.
- John Albert Messervy b. 1861 first elected in 1925 as Conservative member for Queen's, Prince Edward Island.
- James Metcalfe b. 1822 first elected in 1867 as Liberal member for York East, Ontario.
- James Henry Metcalfe b. 1848 first elected in 1892 as Conservative member for Kingston, Ontario.
- François Xavier Ovide Méthot b. 1843 first elected in 1877 as Independent Conservative member for Nicolet, Quebec.
- Adrien Meunier b. 1905 first elected in 1953 as Independent Liberal member for Papineau, Quebec.
- Sydney Chilton Mewburn b. 1863 first elected in 1917 as Unionist member for Hamilton East, Ontario.

== Mia–Mih ==
- Wilson Miao b. 1987 first elected in 2021 as Liberal member Richmond Centre, British Columbia.
- Benoît Michaud b. 1902 first elected in 1945 as Liberal member for Restigouche—Madawaska, New Brunswick.
- Élaine Michaud b. 1985 first elected in 2011 as New Democratic Party member for Portneuf—Jacques-Cartier, Quebec.
- Hervé J. Michaud b. 1912 first elected in 1953 as Liberal member for Kent, New Brunswick.
- Joseph Enoil Michaud b. 1888 first elected in 1933 as Liberal member for Restigouche—Madawaska, New Brunswick.
- Kristina Michaud b. 1993 first elected in 2019 as Bloc Québécois member for Avignon—La Mitis—Matane—Matapédia, Quebec.
- Pius Michaud b. 1870 first elected in 1907 as Liberal member for Victoria, New Brunswick.
- Marjorie Michel first elected in 2025 as Liberal member for Papineau, Quebec.
- Roland Michener b. 1900 first elected in 1953 as Progressive Conservative member for St. Paul's, Ontario.
- William Sora Middlebro b. 1868 first elected in 1908 as Conservative member for Grey North, Ontario.
- Shannon Miedema first elected as Liberal member for Halifax, Nova Scotia
- Fred Mifflin b. 1938 first elected in 1988 as Liberal member for Bonavista—Trinity—Conception, Newfoundland and Labrador.
- Roch Moïse Samuel Mignault b. 1837 first elected in 1891 as Liberal member for Yamaska, Quebec.
- MaryAnn Mihychuk b. 1955 first elected in 2015 as Liberal member for Kildonan—St. Paul, Manitoba.
- Campbell Ewing Millar b. 1911 first elected in 1962 as Progressive Conservative member for Middlesex East, Ontario.

== Mil–Mit ==
- John Millar b. 1866 first elected in 1921 as Progressive member for Qu'Appelle, Saskatchewan.
- Archibald Campbell Miller b. 1836 first elected in 1891 as Conservative member for Prince Edward, Ontario.
- Calvert Charlton Miller b. 1899 first elected in 1946 as Progressive Conservative member for Portage la Prairie, Manitoba.
- Edward Allan Miller b. 1942 first elected in 1979 as New Democratic Party member for Nanaimo—Alberni, British Columbia.
- Henry Horton Miller b. 1861 first elected in 1904 as Liberal member for Grey South, Ontario.
- Larry Miller b. 1956 first elected in 2004 as Conservative member for Grey—Bruce—Owen Sound, Ontario.
- Marc Miller b. 1973 first elected in 2015 as Liberal member for Ville-Marie—Le Sud-Ouest—Île-des-Sœurs, Quebec.
- Clarence Adam Milligan b. 1904 first elected in 1957 as Progressive Conservative member for Prince Edward—Lennox, Ontario.
- Peter Milliken b. 1946 first elected in 1988 as Liberal member for Kingston and the Islands, Ontario.
- David Mills b. 1831 first elected in 1867 as Liberal member for Bothwell, Ontario.
- Dennis Mills b. 1946 first elected in 1988 as Liberal member for Broadview—Greenwood, Ontario.
- John Burpee Mills b. 1850 first elected in 1887 as Conservative member for Annapolis, Nova Scotia.
- Robert Mills b. 1941 first elected in 1993 as Reform member for Red Deer, Alberta.
- Wilson Henry Mills b. 1882 first elected in 1934 as Liberal member for Elgin West, Ontario.
- Robert Milne b. 1881 first elected in 1921 as Progressive member for Neepawa, Manitoba.
- William Ross Milne b. 1932 first elected in 1974 as Liberal member for Peel—Dufferin—Simcoe, Ontario.
- Clement George Minaker b. 1937 first elected in 1984 as Progressive Conservative member for Winnipeg—St. James, Manitoba.
- Giovanna Mingarelli first elected in 2025 as Liberal member for Prescott—Russell—Cumberland, Ontario.
- Maria Minna b. 1948 first elected in 1993 as Liberal member for Beaches—Woodbine, Ontario.
- Andrew Mitchell b. 1953 first elected in 1993 as Liberal member for Parry Sound—Muskoka, Ontario.
- Archibald Hugh Mitchell b. 1903 first elected in 1935 as Social Credit member for Medicine Hat, Alberta.
- Rodger Mitchell b. 1898 first elected in 1953 as Liberal member for Sudbury, Ontario.
- Humphrey Mitchell b. 1894 first elected in 1931 as Labour member for Hamilton East, Ontario.
- Margaret Anne Mitchell b. 1925 first elected in 1979 as New Democratic Party member for Vancouver East, British Columbia.
- Peter Mitchell b. 1824 first elected in 1872 as Independent member for Northumberland, New Brunswick.
- Robert Weld Mitchell b. 1915 first elected in 1953 as Progressive Conservative member for London, Ontario.
- Walter George Mitchell b. 1877 first elected in 1921 as Liberal member for St. Antoine, Quebec.
- Constantine George Mitges b. 1919 first elected in 1972 as Progressive Conservative member for Grey—Simcoe, Ontario.

== Mof–Moo ==
- George Moffat b. 1810 first elected in 1870 as Conservative member for Restigouche, New Brunswick.
- George Moffat b. 1842 first elected in 1887 as Conservative member for Restigouche, New Brunswick.
- Robert Moffat b. 1844 first elected in 1882 as Conservative member for Restigouche, New Brunswick.
- John Patrick Molloy b. 1873 first elected in 1908 as Liberal member for Provencher, Manitoba.
- George Moncrieff b. 1842 first elected in 1887 as Conservative member for Lambton East, Ontario.
- Albéric Archie Mondou b. 1872 first elected in 1911 as Conservative member for Yamaska, Quebec.
- Dominique Monet b. 1865 first elected in 1891 as Liberal member for Napierville, Quebec.
- Marcel Monette b. 1895 first elected in 1949 as Liberal member for Mercier, Quebec.
- Jean-Baptiste Mongenais b. 1803 first elected in 1878 as Conservative member for Vaudreuil, Quebec.
- Joseph-Alfred Mongrain b. 1908 first elected in 1965 as Independent member for Trois-Rivières, Quebec.
- Frederick Debartzch Monk b. 1856 first elected in 1896 as Conservative member for Jacques Cartier, Quebec.
- Maryam Monsef b. 1984 first elected in 2015 as Liberal member for Peterborough—Kawartha, Ontario.
- Walter Humphries Montague b. 1858 first elected in 1887 as Conservative member for Haldimand, Ontario.
- Andrew Monteith b. 1823 first elected in 1874 as Conservative member for Perth North, Ontario.
- Harold Edmond Monteith b. 1900 first elected in 1958 as Progressive Conservative member for Verdun, Quebec.
- Jay Waldo Monteith b. 1903 first elected in 1953 as Progressive Conservative member for Perth, Ontario.
- Ken Monteith b. 1938 first elected in 1988 as Progressive Conservative member for Elgin, Ontario.
- Gage Workman Montgomery b. 1898 first elected in 1952 as Progressive Conservative member for Victoria—Carleton, New Brunswick.
- Hippolyte Montplaisir b. 1839 first elected in 1874 as Liberal-Conservative member for Champlain, Quebec.
- Alvin Head Moore b. 1838 first elected in 1896 as Conservative member for Stanstead, Quebec.
- Barry D. Moore b. 1944 first elected in 1984 as Progressive Conservative member for Pontiac—Gatineau—Labelle, Quebec.
- Christine Moore b. 1983 first elected in 2011 as New Democratic Party member for Abitibi—Témiscamingue, Quebec.
- Harry Andrew Moore b. 1914 first elected in 1962 as Progressive Conservative member for Wetaskiwin, Alberta.
- James Moore b. 1976 first elected in 2000 as Canadian Alliance member for Port Moody—Coquitlam—Port Coquitlam, British Columbia.
- John Clarke Moore b. 1871 first elected in 1930 as Conservative member for Châteauguay—Huntingdon, Quebec.
- Rob Moore b. 1974 first elected in 2004 as Conservative member for Fundy, New Brunswick.
- Ronald Stewart Moore b. 1913 first elected in 1945 as Cooperative Commonwealth Federation member for Churchill, Manitoba.
- William Henry Moore b. 1872 first elected in 1930 as Liberal member for Ontario, Ontario.
- Frank Duff Moores b. 1933 first elected in 1968 as Progressive Conservative member for Bonavista—Trinity—Conception, Newfoundland and Labrador.

== Mor ==
- Raymond Ducharme Morand b. 1887 first elected in 1925 as Conservative member for Essex East, Ontario.
- Marty Morantz b. 1962 first elected in 2019 as Conservative member for Charleswood—St. James—Assiniboia—Headingley, Manitoba.
- Kenneth Hamill More b. 1907 first elected in 1958 as Progressive Conservative member for Regina City, Saskatchewan.
- Maurice John Moreau b. 1927 first elected in 1963 as Liberal member for York—Scarborough, Ontario.
- J. Trevor Morgan b. 1923 first elected in 1972 as Progressive Conservative member for St. Catharines, Ontario.
- Albanie Morin b. 1921 first elected in 1972 as Liberal member for Louis-Hébert, Quebec.
- Billy Morin first elected in 2025 as Conservative member for Edmonton Northwest, Alberta.
- Dany Morin b. 1985 first elected in 2011 as New Democratic Party member for Chicoutimi—Le Fjord, Quebec.
- Georges Dorèze Morin b. 1884 first elected in 1925 as Liberal member for Bagot, Quebec.
- Isabelle Morin b. 1985 first elected in 2011 as New Democratic Party member for Notre-Dame-de-Grâce—Lachine, Quebec.
- Jean-Baptiste Morin b. 1840 first elected in 1896 as Conservative member for Dorchester, Quebec.
- Louis-Simon-René Morin b. 1883 first elected in 1921 as Liberal member for St. Hyacinthe—Rouville, Quebec.
- Marc-André Morin b. 1951 first elected in 2011 as New Democratic Party member for Laurentides—Labelle, Quebec.
- Marie-Claude Morin b. 1985 first elected in 2011 as New Democratic Party member for Saint-Hyacinthe—Bagot, Quebec.
- John Morison b. 1818 first elected in 1867 as Liberal member for Victoria North, Ontario.
- John B. Morison b. 1923 first elected in 1963 as Liberal member for Wentworth, Ontario.
- Émilien Morissette b. 1927 first elected in 1958 as Progressive Conservative member for Rimouski, Quebec.
- Bill Morneau b. 1962 first elected in 2015 as Liberal member for Toronto Centre, Ontario.
- Hugh Boulton Morphy b. 1860 first elected in 1911 as Conservative member for Perth North, Ontario.
- Mike Morrice b. 1984 first elected in 2021 as Green member for Kitchener Centre, Ontario.
- Alexander Morris b. 1826 first elected in 1867 as Conservative member for Lanark South, Ontario.
- Edmund Leverett Morris b. 1923 first elected in 1957 as Progressive Conservative member for Halifax, Nova Scotia.
- James Morris b. 1857 first elected in 1913 as Conservative member for Châteauguay, Quebec.
- Alexander Morrison b. 1851 first elected in 1912 as Conservative member for Macdonald, Manitoba.
- Angus Morrison b. 1822 first elected in 1867 as Conservative member for Niagara, Ontario.
- Aulay MacAulay Morrison b. 1863 first elected in 1896 as Liberal member for New Westminster, British Columbia.
- John Morrison b. 1872 first elected in 1921 as Progressive member for Weyburn, Saskatchewan.
- Lee Glen Morrison b. 1932 first elected in 1993 as Reform member for Swift Current—Maple Creek—Assiniboia, Saskatchewan.
- Rob Morrison b. 1956 first elected in 2019 as Conservative member for Kootenay—Columbia, British Columbia.
- Bobby Morrissey b. 1954 first elected in 2015 as Liberal member for Egmont, Prince Edward Island.
- Charles Joseph Morrissy b. 1881 first elected in 1926 as Liberal member for Northumberland, New Brunswick.
- John Morrissy b. 1857 first elected in 1921 as Liberal member for Northumberland, New Brunswick.
- Murray Douglas Morton b. 1916 first elected in 1957 as Progressive Conservative member for Davenport, Ontario.

== Mos–Mow ==
- Thomas Moss b. 1836 first elected in 1873 as Liberal member for West Toronto, Ontario.
- William Richard Motherwell b. 1860 first elected in 1921 as Liberal member for Regina, Saskatchewan.
- William Malcolm Mott b. 1894 first elected in 1949 as Liberal member for New Westminster, British Columbia.
- Glen Motz b. 1958 first elected in 2016 as Conservative member for Medicine Hat—Cardston—Warner, Alberta.
- Maria Mourani b. 1969 first elected in 2006 as Bloc Québécois member for Ahuntsic, Quebec.
- Joseph Alfred Mousseau b. 1838 first elected in 1874 as Conservative member for Bagot, Quebec.
- Joseph Octave Mousseau b. 1844 first elected in 1891 as Independent member for Soulanges, Quebec.
- Herbert Macdonald Mowat b. 1863 first elected in 1917 as Unionist member for Parkdale, Ontario.

== Mui–Mun ==
- George Robson Muir b. 1903 first elected in 1957 as Progressive Conservative member for Lisgar, Manitoba.
- Robert Muir b. 1919 first elected in 1957 as Progressive Conservative member for Cape Breton North and Victoria, Nova Scotia.
- Mark Muise b. 1957 first elected in 1997 as Progressive Conservative member for West Nova, Nova Scotia.
- Tom Mulcair b. 1954 first elected in 2007 as New Democratic Party member for Outremont, Quebec.
- John Cooney Mullally b. 1930 first elected in 1963 as Liberal member for King's, Prince Edward Island.
- Henry Alfred Mullins b. 1861 first elected in 1925 as Conservative member for Marquette, Manitoba.
- James Patrick Mullins b. 1874 first elected in 1935 as Liberal member for Richmond—Wolfe, Quebec.
- William Mulock b. 1844 first elected in 1882 as Liberal member for York North, Ontario.
- William Pate Mulock b. 1897 first elected in 1934 as Liberal member for York North, Ontario.
- Martin Brian Mulroney b. 1939 first elected in 1983 as Progressive Conservative member for Central Nova, Nova Scotia.
- Albert Edward Munn b. 1865 first elected in 1930 as Liberal member for Vancouver North, British Columbia.
- Donald W. Munro b. 1916 first elected in 1972 as Progressive Conservative member for Esquimalt—Saanich, British Columbia.
- Elgin Albert Munro b. 1874 first elected in 1921 as Liberal member for Fraser Valley, British Columbia.
- John C. Munro b. 1931 first elected in 1962 as Liberal member for Hamilton East, Ontario.
- John H. Munroe b. 1820 first elected in 1867 as Conservative member for Elgin West, Ontario.
- Charles Arthur Munson b. 1857 first elected in 1911 as Conservative member for Northumberland West, Ontario.

== Mur–Muy ==
- James Murdock b. 1871 first elected in 1922 as Liberal member for Kent, Ontario.
- Brian Murphy b. 1961 first elected in 2006 as Liberal member for Moncton—Riverview—Dieppe
- Charles Murphy b. 1862 first elected in 1908 as Liberal member for Russell, Ontario.
- Terrence Murphy b. 1926 first elected in 1968 as Liberal member for Sault Ste. Marie, Ontario.
- Henry Joseph Murphy b. 1921 first elected in 1953 as Liberal member for Westmorland, New Brunswick.
- John Murphy b. 1937 first elected in 1993 as Liberal member for Annapolis Valley—Hants, Nova Scotia.
- Joseph Warner Murphy b. 1892 first elected in 1945 as Progressive Conservative member for Lambton West, Ontario.
- Rodney Edward Murphy b. 1946 first elected in 1979 as New Democratic Party member for Churchill, Manitoba.
- Shawn Murphy b. 1951 first elected in 2000 as Liberal member for Hillsborough, Prince Edward Island.
- Thomas Gerow Murphy b. 1883 first elected in 1925 as Conservative member for Neepawa, Manitoba.
- William Samuel Murphy b. 1882 first elected in 1929 as Independent Conservative member for Lanark, Ontario.
- Alexander Clark Murray b. 1900 first elected in 1949 as Liberal member for Oxford, Ontario.
- George Matheson Murray b. 1889 first elected in 1949 as Liberal member for Cariboo, British Columbia.
- Ian Murray b. 1951 first elected in 1993 as Liberal member for Lanark—Carleton, Ontario.
- Joyce Murray b. 1954 first elected in 2008 as Liberal member for Vancouver Quadra, British Columbia.
- Thomas Murray b. 1836 first elected in 1891 as Liberal member for Pontiac, Quebec.
- William Murray b. 1839 first elected in 1874 as Liberal member for Renfrew North, Ontario.
- Jack Murta b. 1943 first elected in 1970 as Progressive Conservative member for Lisgar, Manitoba.
- Leslie Alexander Mutch b. 1897 first elected in 1935 as Liberal member for Winnipeg South, Manitoba.
- Ephraim Bell Muttart b. 1839 first elected in 1878 as Conservative member for King's County, Prince Edward Island.
- Dan Muys b. 1970 first elected as Conservative member for Flamborough—Glanbrook, Ontario.

== My ==
- Edward Thomas Wordon Myers b. 1879 first elected in 1917 as Unionist member for Kindersley, Saskatchewan.
- John Howard Myers b. 1880 first elected in 1930 as Conservative member for Queen's, Prince Edward Island.
- Lynn Myers b. 1951 first elected in 1997 as Liberal member for Waterloo—Wellington, Ontario.
- David Myles b. 1981 first elected in 2025 as Liberal member for Fredericton—Oromocto, New Brunswick
