= Hugh MacLeod =

Hugh MacLeod or McLeod may refer to:

- Hugh McLeod (politician) (1843–1879), Scottish-born lawyer and political figure in Nova Scotia
- Hugh MacLeod (politician) (1882–1955), Australian politician
- Hugh McLeod (rugby union) (1932–2014), Scottish rugby player
- Hugh McLeod (footballer) (1907–1929), Scottish amateur footballer
- Hugh Magnus MacLeod of MacLeod (born 1973), British filmmaker and 30th Chief of Clan MacLeod
- Hugh MacLeod (minister) (1730–1809), joint founder of the Royal Society of Edinburgh
- Hugh McLeod (Canadian minister) (1803–1894), Scottish-born Presbyterian minister
