= Electoral history of Charles Tupper =

List of elections featuring Charles Tupper as a candidate

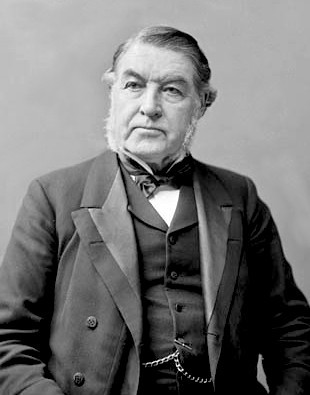
Tupper in 1896.

This article is the Electoral history of Sir Charles Tupper, the sixth Prime Minister of Canada. A Conservative, he became prime minister upon the resignation of Prime Minister Sir Mackenzie Bowell over the Manitoba Schools Question in 1896. Tupper was the shortest-serving prime minister, with a term of only 69 days. He led his party in two general elections (1896, 1900) and lost both, to Sir Wilfrid Laurier

Prior to Confederation in 1867, Tupper was active in Nova Scotia politics, and was Premier of Nova Scotia from 1864 to 1867, when he was elected to the first House of Commons of Canada.

== Summary ==
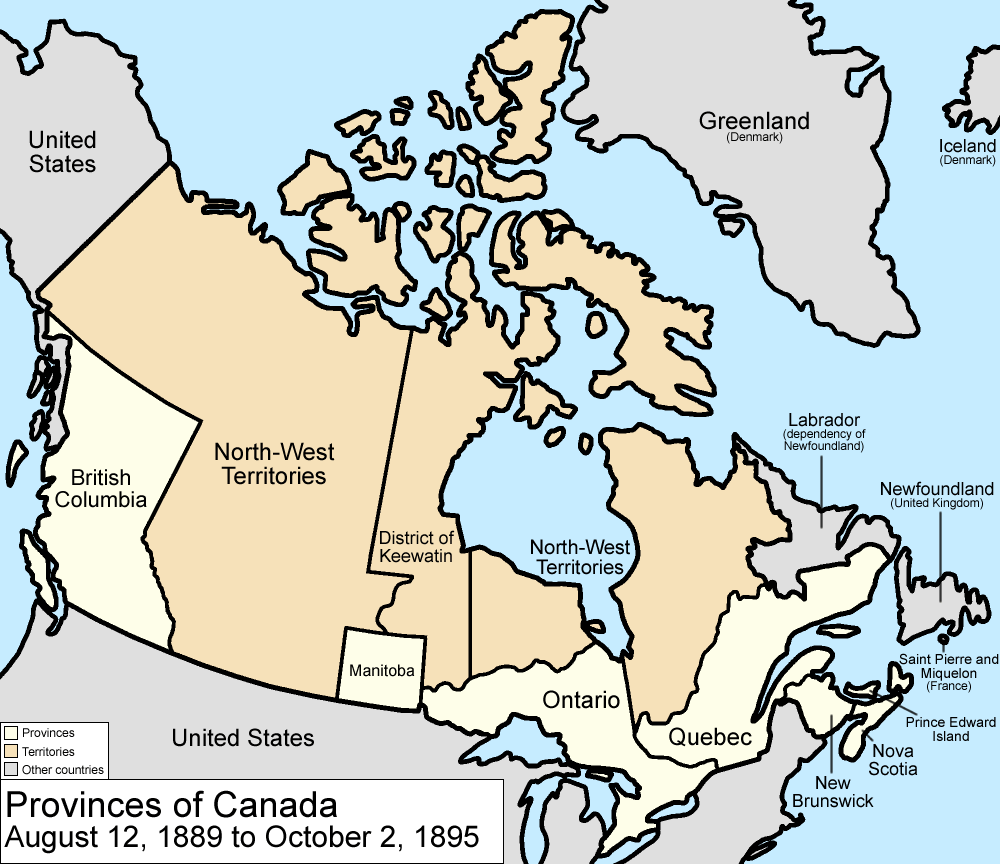
Canada had seven provinces, one territory and one semi-autonomous district during Tupper's term as Prime Minister.

Tupper had the shortest term in office of all twenty-three prime ministers, serving for just 68 days in the spring of 1896.

Tupper was the second of three prime ministers from Nova Scotia, the others being Sir John Sparrow David Thompson and Sir Robert Laird Borden.

He became prime minister upon the resignation of Sir Mackenzie Bowell, who resigned after a Cabinet revolt over his handling of the Manitoba Schools Question. Tupper never sat in the Commons as prime minister, being sworn in as prime minister after the Commons was dissolved and the 1896 election called. He was defeated in the 1896 election by Wilfrid Laurier. Tupper maintained the leadership of the Conservative Party and ran again in the general election of 1900. He was again defeated, including losing his own seat of Cape Breton. He then retired, the last of the Fathers of Confederation to leave politics.

Tupper stood for election to the House of Commons of Canada twelve times, nine times for the constituency of Cumberland, Nova Scotia (1867, 1870, 1872, 1874, 1878 (twice), 1882, and 1887 (twice)), and three times for the constituency of Cape Breton (1896 (twice), 1900). He was elected eleven times, including four times by acclamation (two ministerial by-elections (1870, 1878), one general election (1882), and one case where a sitting Member of Parliament resigned his seat to allow Tupper to re-enter the Commons (1896)). He lost at the constituency level only once, in his final election of 1900. He served a total of 22 years, 7 months, 17 days in the Commons.

Prior to his election to the House of Commons in 1867, Tupper was a member of the General Assembly of Nova Scotia and served as Premier of Nova Scotia from 1864 to 1867.

== Federal general elections, 1896 and 1900 ==
Tupper led the combined Liberal-Conservative Party and Conservative Party in two general elections, losing both (1896, 1900).

=== Federal election, 1896 ===
The 1896 election was the first election since Confederation in 1867 where Sir John A. Macdonald did not lead the Conservatives. Tupper became the formal leader of the Conservatives and was sworn in as prime minister shortly after the election was called. Prior to the election, he had effectively led the government in the House of Commons on the Manitoba Schools Question, since Prime Minister Bowell was in the Senate and had suffered a Cabinet revolt on his handling of the issue. His main opponent in the general election was Wilfrid Laurier, the leader of the Liberals. Although Tupper and the Conservatives won the popular vote, Laurier and the Liberals won the majority of seats and formed the government, the first time at the federal level that the party with the greatest popular vote support did not form the government.

Canadian Federal Election, 1896 - Parties, Leaders, Seats Won and Popular Vote
Party	Leaders	Seats Won	Popular Vote
Liberal	Wilfrid Laurier^{1}	117	41.4%
Conservative	Charles Tupper^{2}	71	44.4%
Liberal-Conservative	Charles Tupper^{2}	15	3.8%
Independent Conservative	–	4	1.3%
Patrons of Industry	–	2	3.9%
McCarthyite	Dalton McCarthy	2	1.3%
Independent	–	1	1.4%
Independent Liberal	–	1	0.2%
Nationalist	–	0	1.5%
Protestant Protective Association	–	0	0.6%
Unknown^{3}	–	0	0.2%
Total		213	100.0%
Source: Library of Parliament – History of Federal Ridings since 1867

^{1} Leader of the Opposition when election was called; Prime Minister after the election.
^{2} Prime Minister shortly after election was called; Leader of the Opposition after the election.
^{3} Election returns in 1896 did not require candidates to declare party affiliation. Some candidates did not list a party affiliation.

=== Federal election, 1900 ===
After four years as Leader of the Opposition, Tupper led the Conservatives in the general election of 1900. He was again defeated by the Liberals under Laurier, who increased both their popular vote and seats won. Tupper lost his own seat in Cape Breton. He retired from public life, the last of the Fathers of Confederation to leave Canadian politics.

Canadian Federal Election, 1900 - Parties, Leaders, Seats Won and Popular Vote
Party	Leaders	Seats Won	Popular Vote
Liberal	Wilfrid Laurier^{1}	128	50.3%
Conservative	Charles Tupper^{2}	69	43.2%
Liberal-Conservative	Charles Tupper^{2}	10	2.9%
Independent	–	3	1.4%
Independent Conservative	–	1	1.1%
Independent Liberal	–	1	0.5%
Independent Labour	–	1	0.4%
Labour	–	0	0.3%
Unknown^{3}	–	0	0.0%^{4}
Total		213	100.1%^{5}
Source: Library of Parliament – History of Federal Ridings since 1867

^{1} Prime Minister when election was called; Prime Minister after the election.
^{2} Leader of the Opposition when election was called; Leader of the Opposition after the election.
^{3} Election returns in 1900 did not require candidates to declare party affiliation. Some candidates did not list a party affiliation.
^{4} "Unknown" candidates only received 27 votes nationally.
^{5} Rounding error.

== Federal constituency elections, 1867 to 1900 ==
Tupper stood for election to the Canadian House of Commons twelve times, nine times for the constituency of Cumberland, Nova Scotia (1867, 1870, 1872, 1874, 1878 (twice), 1882, and 1887 (twice)), and three times for the constituency of Cape Breton (1896 (twice), 1900). He won eleven of those elections and lost only once, in 1900.

=== 1867 Federal election: Cumberland ===
Federal Election, 1867: Cumberland, Nova Scotia
Party	Candidate	Popular Vote	%
Conservative	Yes Charles Tupper	1,368	51.8%
Anti-Confederation	William Annand	1,271	48.2%
Total		2,639	100.0%
Source: Library of Parliament – History of Federal Ridings since 1867: Cumberland

Yes Elected.

=== 1870 Federal Ministerial By-Election: Cumberland ===
Federal Ministerial By-election, June 15, 1870: Cumberland, Nova Scotia On Mr. Tupper being called to the Privy Council and appointed President of that body, June 21, 1870
Party	Candidate	Popular Vote	%
Conservative	Yes X Charles Tupper	Acclaimed	–
Source: Library of Parliament – History of Federal Ridings since 1867: Cumberland

Yes Elected.
X Incumbent.

At this time, newly appointed Cabinet ministers had to stand for re-election, but it was customary for the other political party not to oppose the election.

=== 1872 Federal election: Cumberland ===
Federal Election, 1872: Cumberland, Nova Scotia
Party	Candidate	Popular Vote	%
Conservative	Yes X Charles Tupper	1,911	74.6%
Unknown	W. A. D. Morse	650	25.4%
Total		2,561	100.0%
Source: Library of Parliament – History of Federal Ridings since 1867: Cumberland

Yes Elected.
X Incumbent.

=== 1874 Federal election: Cumberland ===
Federal Election, 1874: Cumberland, Nova Scotia
Party	Candidate	Popular Vote	%
Conservative	Yes X Charles Tupper	1,580	56.8%
Unknown	George Hibbard	1,201	43.2%
Total		2,781	100.0%
Source: Library of Parliament – History of Federal Ridings since 1867: Cumberland

Yes Elected.
X Incumbent.

=== 1878 Federal election: Cumberland ===
Federal Election, 1878: Cumberland, Nova Scotia
Party	Candidate	Popular Vote	%
Conservative	Yes X Charles Tupper	2,030	58.0%
Liberal	William Thomas Pipes	1,468	42.0%
Total		3,498	100.0%
Source: Library of Parliament – History of Federal Ridings since 1867: Cumberland

Yes Elected.
X Incumbent.

=== 1878 Federal Ministerial By-Election: Cumberland ===
Federal Ministerial By-election, November 4, 1878: Cumberland, Nova Scotia On Mr. Tupper being named Minister of Public Works, October 17, 1878
Party	Candidate	Popular Vote	%
Conservative	Yes X Charles Tupper	Acclaimed	–
Source: Library of Parliament – History of Federal Ridings since 1867: Cumberland

Yes Elected.
X Incumbent.

At this time, newly appointed Cabinet ministers had to stand for re-election, but it was customary for the other political party not to oppose the election.

=== 1882 Federal election: Cumberland ===
Federal Election, 1882: Cumberland, Nova Scotia
Party	Candidate	Popular Vote	%
Conservative	Yes X Charles Tupper	Acclaimed	–
Total		–	–
Source: Library of Parliament – History of Federal Ridings since 1867: Cumberland

Yes Elected.
X Incumbent.

=== 1887 Federal election: Cumberland ===
Federal Election, 1887: Cumberland, Nova Scotia
Party	Candidate	Popular Vote	%
Conservative	Yes Charles Tupper^{1}	2,788	54.5%
Liberal	William Thomas Pipes	2,120	41.5%
Independent (Prohibition)	John Thomas Bulmer^{2}	206	4.0%
Total		5,114	100.0%
Source: Library of Parliament – History of Federal Ridings since 1867: Cumberland

Yes Elected.

^{1} Although Tupper had won the election in 1882, by 1887 he was no longer the incumbent, having been appointed the Canadian High Commissioner to the United Kingdom in 1884. Charles James Townshend, also a Conservative, was elected by acclamation to the vacant seat in 1884. Tupper returned from Britain in 1887 and again stood for election. Townshend did not participate in the election.

^{2} Bulmer, the independent candidate, ran on a platform of liquor prohibition.

=== 1887 Federal By-Election: Cumberland ===
Federal By-election, November 9, 1887: Cumberland, Nova Scotia On Mr Tupper's election being declared void
Party	Candidate	Popular Vote	%
Conservative	Yes X Charles Tupper	2,468	70.6
Independent (Prohibition)	John Thomas Bulmer	1,026	29.4%
Total		3,494	100.0%
Source: Library of Parliament – History of Federal Ridings since 1867: Cumberland

Yes Elected.
X Incumbent.

=== 1896 Federal By-Election: Cape Breton ===
Federal By-election, February 4, 1896: Cape Breton, Nova Scotia On the resignation of the incumbent, Mr. MacKeen, to provide a seat for Sir Charles Tupper, December 18, 1895.
Party	Candidate	Popular Vote	%
Conservative	Yes Charles Tupper	Acclaimed	–
Source: Library of Parliament – History of Federal Ridings since 1867: Cape Breton

Yes Elected.

=== 1896 Federal election: Cape Breton ===
Federal Election, 1896: Cape Breton, Nova Scotia
Party	Candidate	Popular Vote	%
Conservative	Yes X Charles Tupper	3,630	29.8%
Liberal-Conservative	Yes X Hector Francis McDougall	3,430	28.1%
Liberal	Arthur Samuel Kendall	2,813	23.1%
Liberal	Joseph McPherson	2,328	19.1%
Total		12,201	100.1%^{1}
Source: Library of Parliament – History of Federal Ridings since 1867: Cape Breton

^{1} Rounding error
Yes Elected. Note: the riding returned two members at this time.
X Incumbent

=== 1900 Federal election: Cape Breton ===
Federal Election, 1900: Cape Breton, Nova Scotia
Party	Candidate	Popular Vote	%
Liberal	Yes Alexander Johnston	3,922	26.0%
Liberal	Yes Arthur Samuel Kendall	3,890	25.8%
Conservative	X Charles Tupper	3,672	24.3%
Liberal-Conservative	X Hector Francis McDougall	3,604	23.9%
Total		15,088	100.0%
Source: Library of Parliament – History of Federal Ridings since 1867: Cape Breton

Yes Elected. Note: the riding returned two members at this time.
X Incumbent

== Nova Scotia elections, 1855 - 1863 ==
Tupper first stood for election to the Nova Scotia House of Assembly as a Conservative in the general election of 1855, winning in the County of Cumberland, defeating Joseph Howe. Although the Liberals won a majority of seats, gradual defections from the Liberal government to the Conservative opposition led to the Conservatives forming the government in 1857. Tupper became Provincial Secretary, a Cabinet position. In the 1859 election, Tupper was re-elected in Cumberland, but the Liberals again won a majority of seats and the Conservative government resigned. In the general election of 1863, the Conservatives returned to power. A year later, Premier Johnston retired and Tupper became Premier of Nova Scotia, a position he held until July 4, 1867.

== See also ==
- Electoral history of Mackenzie Bowell – Tupper's predecessor as leader of the Conservative Party and as prime minister.
- Electoral history of Wilfrid Laurier – Tupper's successor as prime minister and principal opponent in two general elections.
- Electoral history of Robert Borden – Tupper's successor as leader of the Conservative Party.
