= William McDonald (Canadian politician) =

Canadian politician (1837–1916)

The Hon. William McDonald
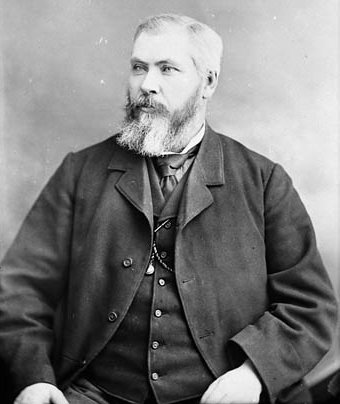

Member of the Canadian Parliament for Cape Breton
- In office 1872–1884 Serving with Newton LeGayet Mackay (1872-1878); Hugh McLeod (1878-1879); William Mackenzie McLeod (1879-1882); Murray Dodd (1882-1884)
- Preceded by: James Charles McKeagney
- Succeeded by: Hector Francis McDougall

Senator for Cape Breton, Nova Scotia
- In office 1884–1916
- Appointed by: John A. Macdonald

Personal details
- Born: October 7, 1837 Inverness, Nova Scotia
- Died: July 4, 1916 (aged 78)
- Party: Conservative

William McDonald (October 7, 1837 – July 4, 1916) was a Canadian politician.

Born at the Settlement of River Deny's Road, Inverness, Nova Scotia, the son of Mary McDonald and Allan McDonald, who emigrated from South Uist, Scotland, McDonald was educated at St. Francois Xavier College, Antigonish, Nova Scotia.

A merchant, he was first elected to the House of Commons of Canada for Cape Breton in the 1872 federal election. A Conservative, he was re-elected in 1874, 1878, and 1882. In 1884, he was called to the Senate on the advice of John Alexander Macdonald representing the senatorial division of Cape Breton, Nova Scotia. He served for almost 44 years as a member of parliament and senator until his death in 1916.

The intersection of Main, Union and Commercial streets in downtown Glace Bay is named "Senator's Corner" in his honour.

== Electoral record ==
1878 Canadian federal election: Cape Breton
Party	Candidate	Votes	%	Elected
Liberal–Conservative	Hugh McLeod	2,056	34.52	✓
Conservative	William McDonald	2,051	34.44	✓
Liberal	Newton LeGayet Mackay	1,153	19.36	
Unknown	Walter Young	696	11.69	
Total valid votes		5,956	–	
Source: Library of Parliament

1874 Canadian federal election: Cape Breton
Party	Candidate	Votes	%	Elected
Conservative	William McDonald	1,251	35.79	✓
Liberal	Newton LeGayet Mackay	1,136	32.50	✓
Liberal–Conservative	Hugh McLeod	1,108	31.70	
Total valid votes		3,495	–	
Source: Library of Parliament

1872 Canadian federal election: Cape Breton
Party	Candidate	Votes	%	Elected
Conservative	Newton LeGayet Mackay	1,240	30.30	✓
Conservative	William McDonald	1,038	25.37	✓
Liberal–Conservative	Hugh McLeod	932	22.78	
Liberal–Conservative	James Charles McKeagney	882	21.55	
Total valid votes		4,092	–	
Source: Library of Parliament
