= David A. Hearn =

Canadian politician

MLA for Richmond County
- In office 1886 to 1890

Personal details
- Born: February 14, 1853 Arichat, Nova Scotia
- Died: March 9, 1920 (aged 67) Sydney, Nova Scotia
- Party: Liberal-Conservative

David A. Hearn, KC (February 14, 1853 – March 9, 1920) was a lawyer and political figure in Nova Scotia, Canada. He represented Richmond County in the Nova Scotia House of Assembly from 1886 to 1890 as a Liberal-Conservative member.

He was born in Arichat, Nova Scotia, the son of James Hearn, of Irish origin, and Isabella Campbell, who came from Scotland. He was educated in Arichat and was called to the Nova Scotia bar in 1878. In 1879, he married Elizabeth Ida Quinan. Hearn served as a member of the council for Richmond County, as a school commissioner and was a census commissioner in 1881. In 1891, he moved his practice to Sydney. In 1893, he became one of the founding members of the Sydney Lawn Tennis Club which was incorporated by an Act of the Nova Scotia Legislature. Hearn advocated the abolition of the province's Legislative Council. He married Bridget Mary Ormond in 1905 following the death of his first wife. In 1907, he was named King's Counsel. Hearn was a member of the Knights of Columbus and at one time was president of the Nova Scotia Barristers Association. He died of pneumonia in 1920.
