= Fred Langdon Davis =

Canadian politician

Member of Parliament for Neepawa
- In office 1917–1921
- Succeeded by: Robert Milne

Personal details
- Born: August 6, 1868 Belleville, Ontario
- Died: April 9, 1951 (aged 82) Neepawa, Manitoba
- Party: Unionist
- Spouse(s): Elizabeth Ellen Webster m. 1895
- Profession: lawyer

Frederick Langdon Davis, KC (August 6, 1868 – April 9, 1951) was a lawyer and political figure in Manitoba, Canada. He represented Neepawa in the House of Commons of Canada as a Unionist member.

He was born in Belleville, Ontario, the son of James A. Davis and Sarah Way. Davis came to Winnipeg in 1881 and studied at the University of Manitoba. He articled in law with Frank Stayner Nugent and then William Egerton Perdue, entered practice in 1893 and was called to the Manitoba bar in 1900. He set up practice in Neepawa. Davis was president of the local board of trade and served on the school board. In 1895, he married Elizabeth Ellen Webster. In 1936, he was named King's Counsel.

During World War I, Davis spoke out in favour of better treatment of "enemy aliens", persons residing in Canada who held citizenship in countries at war with Canada:

If we treat such men as men and brothers, we will make Canadians of them; if we treat them in any other fashion, we will make of them an alien element in Canada.

"Enemy aliens" were interred in labour camps across the country during the war under the authority of the War Measures Act of 1914. The same legislation would later be invoked during World War II and the October Crisis of 1970. He died in Neepawa in 1951.
