= Cromarty Tennis Club =

Tennis club in Sydney, Nova Scotia, Canada

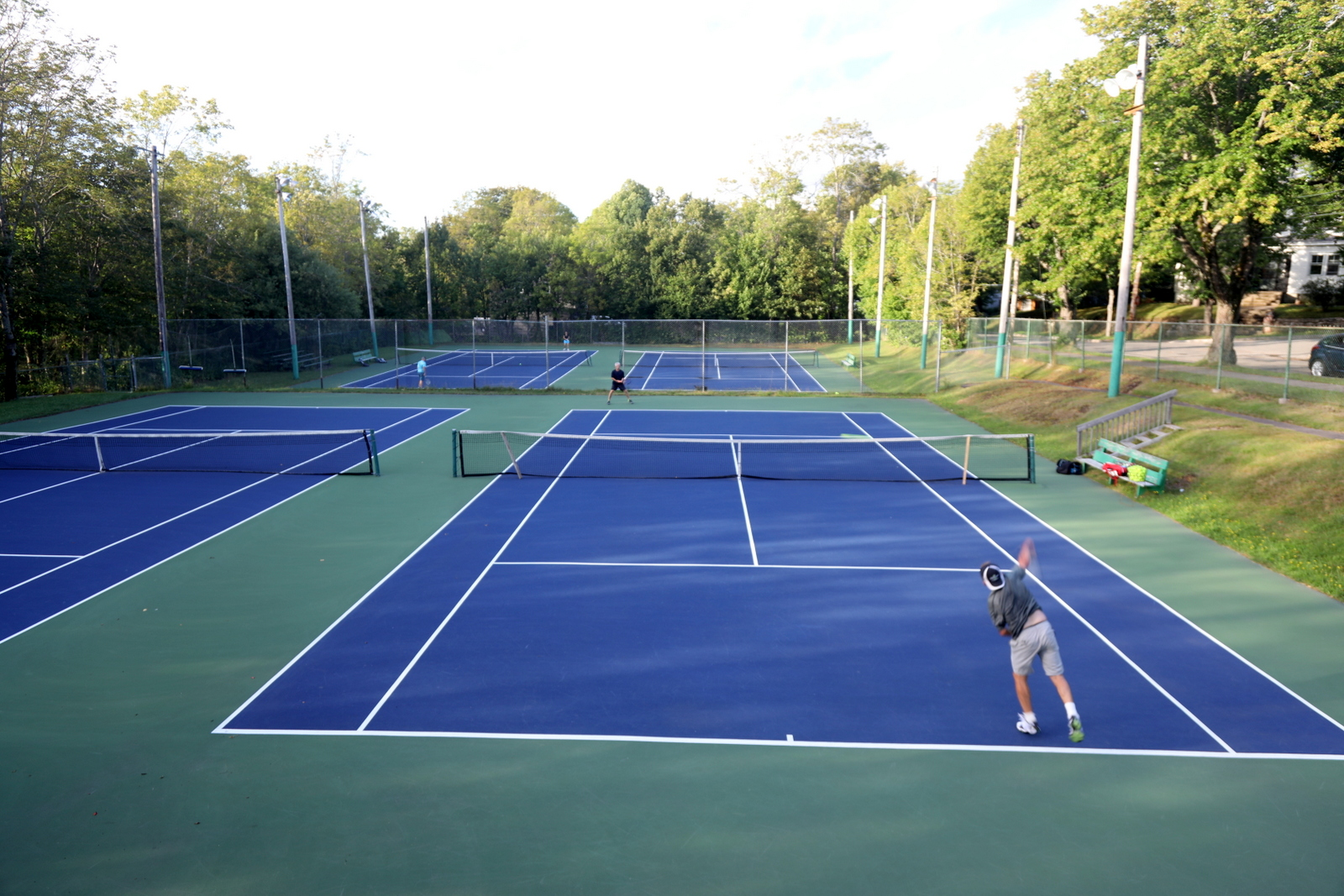
- The four hard surfaced courts.
- Interactive map of Cromarty Tennis Club
- Former names: Sydney Lawn Tennis Club, Sydney Tennis Association, Ltd., Cromarty Kinsmen Tennis Club
- Address: 65 Cromarty Street
- Location: Sydney, Cape Breton Island, Nova Scotia, Canada
- Coordinates: 46°07′41″N 60°11′19″W
- Owner: Cape Breton Regional Municipality
- Operator: Cromarty Tennis Club Society
- Type: Tennis club
- Surface: Hard surfaced courts (synthetic/acrylic over asphalt)
- Acreage: 1.36
- Public transit: Transit Cape Breton Route 13

Construction
- Opened: 1902; 124 years ago
- Renovated: 1996

Website
- clubspark.ca/cromartytennisclub

Cromarty Tennis Club is a private tennis club situated in the community of Sydney, part of Nova Scotia's Cape Breton Regional Municipality. Cromarty Tennis Club is one of the oldest tennis clubs in Nova Scotia, established at its present location along Reservoir Brook (formerly Wentworth Creek or Sullivan's Brook), in Sydney in 1902. The club's address is 65 Cromarty Street, Sydney. Cromarty Tennis Club is a member of Tennis Nova Scotia.

Programs offered by the club include junior and senior (adult) lessons, team tennis, competitive ladder, junior ladder, club mixers and socials as well as the Cape Breton Junior Regionals, Masters Championships, and the Cape Breton Open tournaments. There are both organized and unorganized playing schedules with the club operating from mid-May to late November each year. The club has between 150 and 200 members, 100 of whom are children. The club also offers up to three youth summer tennis camps each season.

== Facilities ==
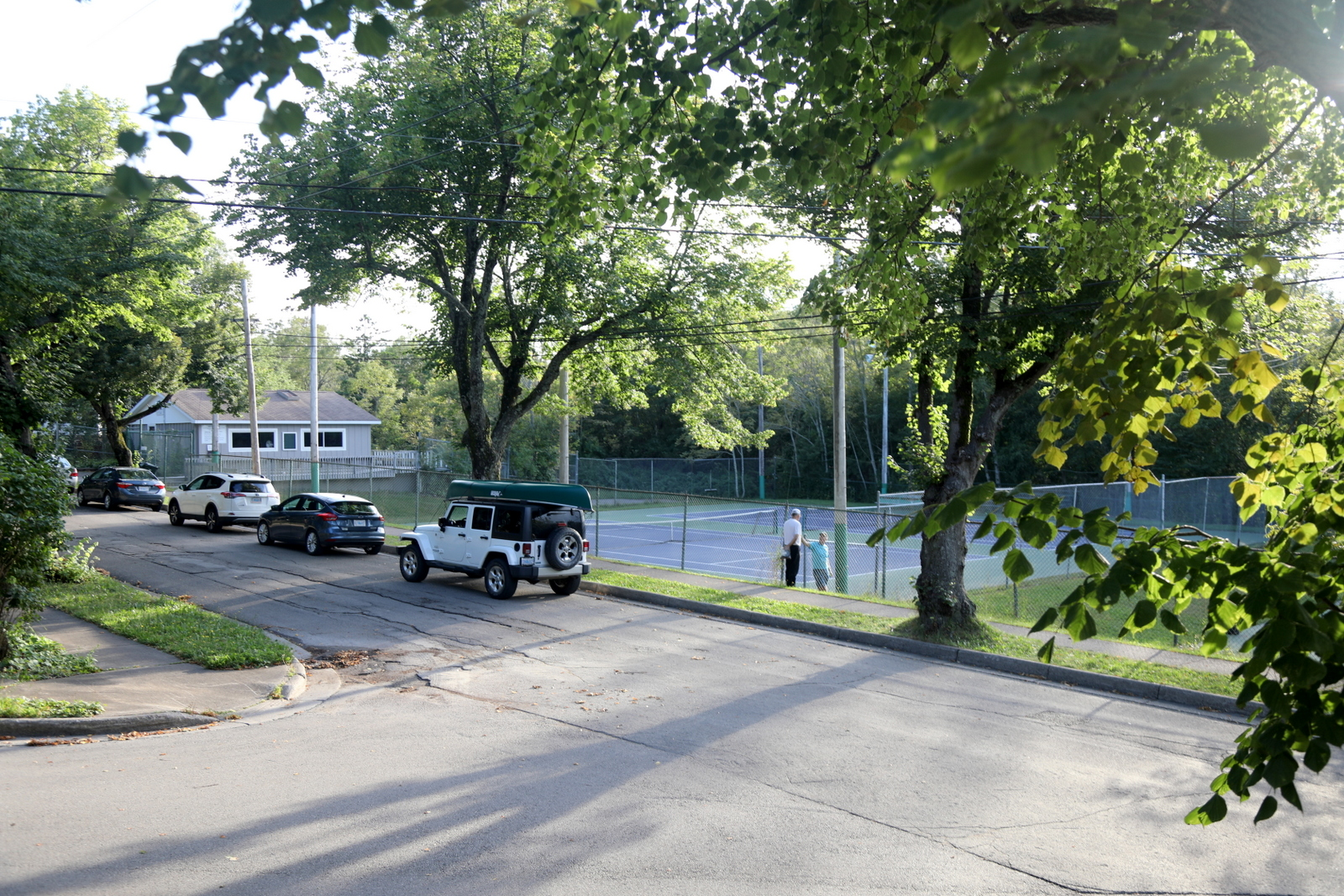
Cromarty Tennis Club

=== Courts ===
There are 4 hard surfaced courts (synthetic/acrylic over asphalt). All courts are lit for evening play. The courts were completely rebuilt and resurfaced in 1996, and resurfaced again in 2002, 2006 and 2011.

=== Clubhouse ===
There is a Clubhouse with a lounge, washrooms, and an outdoor deck overlooking the courts.

== Cape Breton Open ==
The Cape Breton Open tennis championships was hosted by the Cromarty Tennis Club in 1936, 1940, 1941, 1942, and after pausing for the remainder of World War II, again in 1947, and 1949, as well as hosting the Nova Scotia Open (the Provincial tennis championship), that same year. The Cape Breton Open has been held by Cromarty each year annually thereafter.

The Open attracts some of the top tennis players from across the province, drawing 50 to 75 players in open division (men' and women's open singles, open double, and mixed doubles), men's singles over-35, over-45, over-55, and over-65, women's singles over-35, and men's and women's doubles over-35 Masters divisions.

== History ==
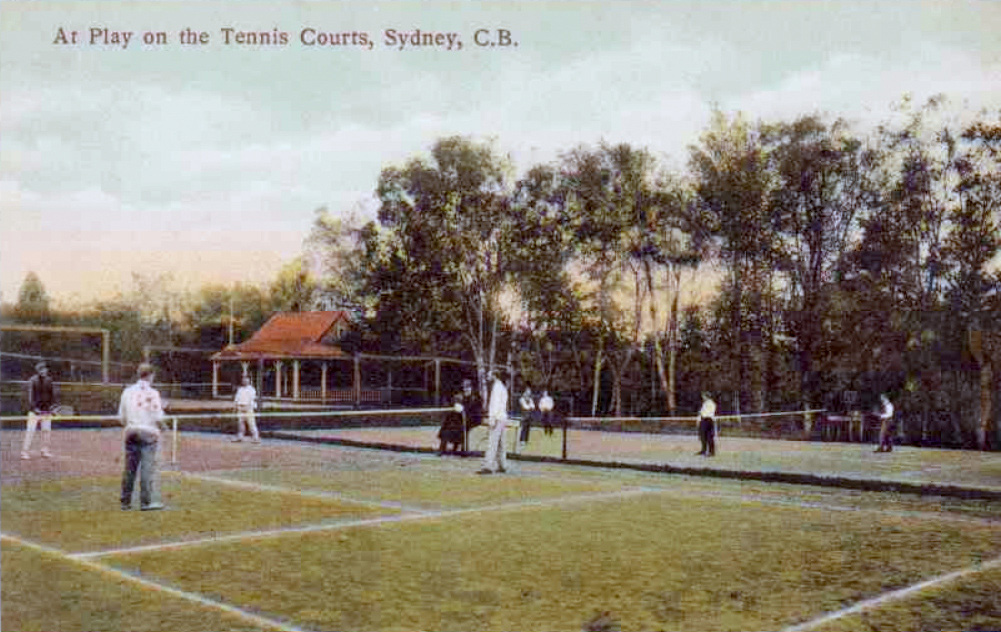
The first Cromarty Clubhouse, ca. 1908

The Sydney Lawn Tennis Club was incorporated by an Act of the Nova Scotia Legislature on 28 April 1893. The club was founded by five gentlemen. (Note: The gentlemen were Murray Dodd, Frederick C. Kimber, Edmund T. MacKeen, John A. Young, David A. Hearn)

A few years later, the Sydney Lawn Tennis Club decided to purchase about an acre of land at Sherwood, part of the Dr. McLeod estate on Reservoir Brook in Sydney. They believed this would provide enough land to construct five tennis courts, a bowling green, handball courts, and quiet grounds. The price was to be about $2,500. On the evening of 24 April 1902, a meeting of subscribers to the Tennis Association were held at the offices of Burchell & McIntyre in Sydney. By June 1902 two courts had been completed and were in use every evening by the players. The remaining courts were to be completed as soon as the weather would permit.

A formal opening of the Lawn Tennis grounds at Cromarty took place on Saturday afternoon, 19 July 1902 and was largely attended. [Sydney Daily Post, July 21, 1902] The Sydney Lawn Tennis Club's Annual Tournament, held on the club's new grounds at Cromarty Street, commenced on 5 August 1902.

The following year, An Act to incorporate the Sydney Tennis Association, Limited was passed on the 11th day of April, A.D., 1903. Five members were named in the Act's introduction. (Note: The members were Frederick C. Kimber, Frederick C. Kimber, Howard S Ross, Henry H. McDougall, Charles P. Fullerton and Charles J. Burchell) That same year the third annual Nova Scotia Lawn Tennis Association Annual Tournament was held on the grounds of the Sydney Tennis Club.

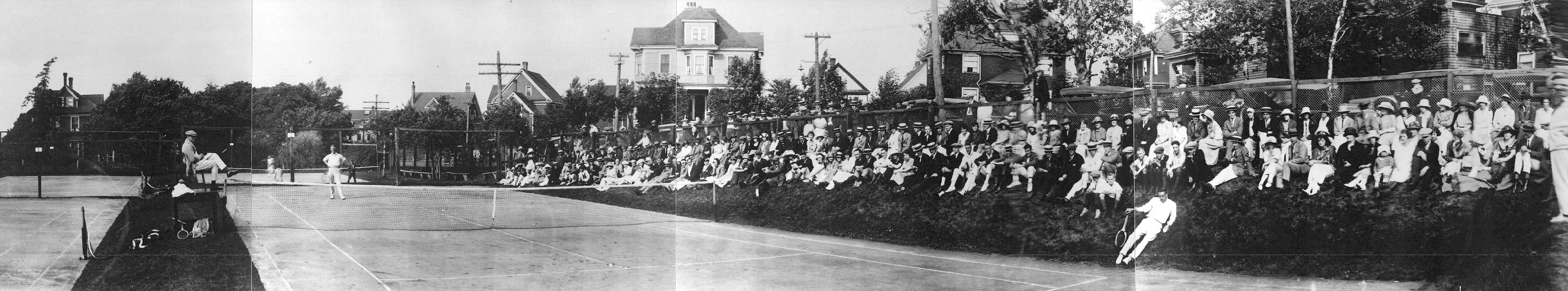
A break in a tennis match at the Sydney Lawn Tennis Courts (now Cromarty Tennis Club), dated late 1920s.

The first club house was built by 1905. The association transferred title of the property to the Kinsmen in 1958. The ownership of the property was transferred to the City of Sydney (now the Cape Breton Regional Municipality - CBRM) on 1 January 1963, and the club has since that time been operated by the Cromarty Tennis Club Society (Incorporated 22 May 1980), and its predecessors. The CBRM gives the club a $5,000 annual operating grant.
