= Hector Francis McDougall =

Canadian politician (1848–1914)

Nova Scotia House of Assembly for Cape Breton County
- In office October 22, 1878 – May 23, 1882

Member of House of Commons of Canada for Cape Breton
- In office July 3, 1884 – November 6, 1900
- Preceded by: William McDonald
- Succeeded by: Arthur Samuel Kendall

Personal details
- Born: June 6, 1848 Christmas Island, Nova Scotia
- Died: November 27, 1914 (aged 66) Glace Bay, Nova Scotia
- Party: Liberal-Conservative
- Profession: Merchant, Politician

Hector Francis McDougall (June 6, 1848 – November 27, 1914) was a merchant and political figure in Nova Scotia, Canada. He represented Cape Breton in the House of Commons of Canada from 1884 to 1900 as a Liberal-Conservative.

McDougall was born in Christmas Island, Nova Scotia, the son of Malcolm McDougall and Mary McNeil. He was named a justice of the peace in 1873. In 1875, he married Christina Cameron. McDougall became a general merchant at Christmas Island. He was a councillor for Cape Breton Municipality Number 14, Grassy Narrows, from 1886 to 1889. McDougall represented Cape Breton County in the Nova Scotia House of Assembly from 1878 to 1882. He was a minister without portfolio in the province's Executive Council. He ran unsuccessfully for a seat in the House of Commons in 1882 but was elected in an 1884 by-election held after William McDonald was named to the Senate. McDougall was unsuccessful in a bid for reelection in 1900. He died in Glace Bay at the age of 66.

1882 Canadian federal election: Cape Breton
Party	Candidate	Votes	%	Elected
Conservative	William McDonald	1,297	23.14	✓
Conservative	Murray Dodd	1,237	22.07	✓
Liberal–Conservative	William Mackenzie McLeod	1,124	20.05	
Liberal	Newton LeGayet Mackay	1,013	18.07	
Liberal–Conservative	Hector Francis McDougall	934	16.66	
Total valid votes		5,605	–	
Source: Library of Parliament
