= David MacKeen =

Canadian politician (1839–1916)

The Honourable David MacKeen
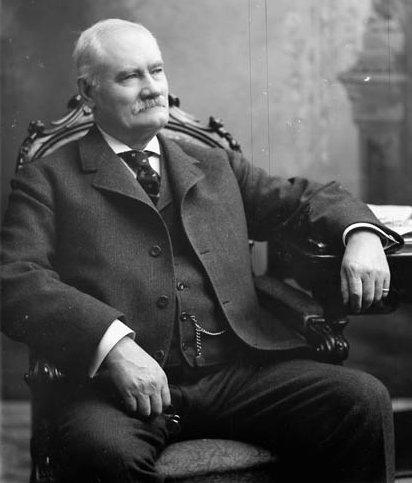

11th Lieutenant Governor of Nova Scotia
- In office October 19, 1915 – November 13, 1916
- Monarch: George V
- Governors General: the Duke of Connaught and Strathearn; The Duke of Devonshire
- Premier: George Henry Murray
- Preceded by: James Drummond McGregor
- Succeeded by: MacCallum Grant

Senator for Cape Breton, Nova Scotia
- In office February 21, 1896 – October 15, 1915
- Nominated by: Mackenzie Bowell

Member of the Canadian Parliament for Cape Breton
- In office February 22, 1887 – February 21, 1896
- Preceded by: Hector Francis McDougall
- Succeeded by: Charles Tupper

Personal details
- Born: September 20, 1839 Mabou, Nova Scotia, Canada
- Died: November 13, 1916 (aged 77) Mabou, Nova Scotia, Canada
- Party: Conservative
- Children: Henry Poole MacKeen
- Occupation: surveyor, mine manager
- Profession: politician

David MacKeen (September 20, 1839 – November 13, 1916) was a Canadian surveyor, mine manager, politician, and the 11th Lieutenant Governor of Nova Scotia.

== Life ==
Born in Mabou, he was elected to the House of Commons of Canada for the riding of Cape Breton in the 1887 federal election. A Conservative, he was re-elected in the 1891 election. He was summoned to the Senate of Canada in 1896, representing the senatorial division of Cape Breton, Nova Scotia. He resigned in 1915 when he was appointed Lieutenant Governor of Nova Scotia. He died in office in 1916.

== Electoral record ==
1891 Canadian federal election: Cape Breton
Party	Candidate	Votes	%	Elected
Conservative	David MacKeen	2,889	29.45	✓
Liberal–Conservative	Hector Francis McDougall	2,681	27.33	✓
Liberal	George Henry Murray	2,161	22.03	
Liberal	Joseph McPherson	2,078	21.18	
Total valid votes		9,809	–	
Source: Library of Parliament

1887 Canadian federal election: Cape Breton
Party	Candidate	Votes	%	Elected
Liberal–Conservative	Hector Francis McDougall	1,883	21.97	✓
Conservative	David MacKeen	1,873	21.86	✓
Liberal	George Henry Murray	1,703	19.87	
Liberal	Michael Slattery	1,071	12.50	
Independent	Joseph A. Gillis	896	10.46	
Independent	John K. McLeod	606	7.07	
Independent	Ebenezer Tilton Moseley	538	6.28	
Total valid votes		8,570	–	
Source: Library of Parliament
