= Frederick Donald MacKenzie =

Canadian politician

Member of the Canadian Parliament for Neepawa
- In office 1935–1945
- Preceded by: Thomas Gerow Murphy
- Succeeded by: John Bracken

Personal details
- Born: 18 December 1882 Presqu'île, Ontario
- Died: 13 October 1970 (aged 87) Ottawa, Ontario
- Party: Liberal
- Spouse(s): Wilma Christina Robertson (m. 12 March 1921)
- Occupation: School principal, teacher

Frederick Donald MacKenzie (18 December 1882 – 13 October 1970) was a soldier, teacher and Member of Parliament in Canada.

Mackenzie was born in Presqu'île, Ontario and was educated at Owen Sound Collegiate and Vocational Institute and Queen's University where he earned a Bachelor of Arts.

He served during the First World War with the Queen's University Hospital Unit from 1915 to 1916 in Egypt and the Dardanelles. He was subsequently a lieutenant with the Canadian Field Artillery from 1916 to 1919.

Following the war, he returned to Canada and settled in Neepawa, Manitoba, where he worked as a teacher and became a school principal.

In the 1935 federal election he ran as a Liberal candidate in Neepawa and was returned to the House of Commons of Canada. He was re-elected in the 1940 federal election but defeated in the 1945 election by the Progressive Conservative leader and former Manitoba Premier John Bracken.

He died in 1970 in Ottawa.
