= Neepawa (electoral district) =

Former federal electoral district in Manitoba, Canada

Manitoba electoral district

Defunct federal electoral district
- Legislature: House of Commons
- District created: 1914
- District abolished: 1947
- First contested: 1917
- Last contested: 1945

Neepawa was a federal electoral district in Manitoba, Canada, that was represented in the House of Commons of Canada from 1917 to 1949.

This riding was created in 1914 from parts of Dauphin and Portage la Prairie ridings. It was abolished in 1947 when it was redistributed into Brandon, Dauphin, Marquette and Portage—Neepawa ridings.

== Members of Parliament ==
This riding elected the following members of Parliament:

1. Fred Langdon Davis, Unionist (1917–1921)
2. Robert Milne, Progressive (1921–1925)
3. Thomas Gerow Murphy, Conservative (1925–1926)
4. Robert Milne, Progressive (1926–1930)
5. Thomas Gerow Murphy, Conservative (1930–1935)
6. Frederick Donald Mackenzie, Liberal (1935–1945)
7. John Bracken, Progressive Conservative (1945–1949)

== Election results ==
1917 Canadian federal election
Party	Candidate	Votes
Government (Unionist)	DAVIS, Fred Langdon	5,102
Opposition (Laurier Liberals)	MCGREGOR, Albert Daniel	2,046

1921 Canadian federal election
Party	Candidate	Votes
Progressive	MILNE, Robert	7,876
Conservative	ROSS, Hugh Robert	2,147

1925 Canadian federal election
Party	Candidate	Votes
Conservative	MURPHY, Thomas Gerow	3,461
Progressive	MILNE, Robert	3,332
Liberal	BROADFOOT, Peter	1,809

1926 Canadian federal election
Party	Candidate	Votes
Progressive	MILNE, Robert	6,293
Conservative	MURPHY, Thomas Gerow	4,495

1930 Canadian federal election
Party	Candidate	Votes
Conservative	MURPHY, Thomas Gerow	5,638
Progressive	MILNE, Robert	5,161

By-election: On Mr. Murphy's acceptance of an office of emolument under the Crown, 7 August 1930

Canadian federal by-election, 25 August 1930
Party	Candidate	Votes
Conservative	MURPHY, Hon. Thomas Gerow	acclaimed

1935 Canadian federal election
Party	Candidate	Votes
Liberal	MACKENZIE, Frederick Donald	5,968
Conservative	MURPHY, Hon. Thomas Gerow	4,582
Reconstruction	MARTIN, John Roy	1,091
Co-operative Commonwealth	BEATTIE, Samuel Henry Sinclair	1,015

1940 Canadian federal election
Party	Candidate	Votes
Liberal	MACKENZIE, Frederick Donald	6,724
National Government	MURPHY, Hon. Thomas Gerow	4,865
New Democracy	DUFFY, John Hazelett	2,208

1945 Canadian federal election
Party	Candidate	Votes
Progressive Conservative	BRACKEN, John	6,497
Liberal	MACKENZIE, Frederick Donald	4,624
Co-operative Commonwealth	WOOD, James Henry	2,848

== See also ==
- List of Canadian electoral districts
- Historical federal electoral districts of Canada
