= James Charles McKeagney =

Canadian politician (1815–1879)

Member of the Canadian Parliament for Cape Breton
- In office 1867–1872
- Succeeded by: Newton LeGayet Mackay; William McDonald

Personal details
- Born: 1815 County Tyrone, Ireland
- Died: 14 September 1879 (aged 63–64) St. Andrews, New Brunswick, Canada
- Party: Anti-Confederate

James Charles McKeagney (1815 – 14 September 1879) was a Canadian lawyer, politician, and judge.

Born in County Tyrone, Ireland, he moved to Nova Scotia with his family in 1822. He was educated in Baddeck and at McQueen's Academy in Halifax. McKeagney was called to the Nova Scotia bar in 1838. He was first elected to the Nova Scotia House of Assembly for Richmond County in 1840 but his election was overturned on a technicality. McKeagney represented Inverness County from 1843 to 1847 and then Sydney Township from 1848 to 1851 and again from 1855 to 1859. In 1857, he was named inspector of mines and minerals. McKeagney was named Queen's Counsel in 1866.

He was married twice: to Eliza Henry in 1842 and to Eliza Hearne in 1857.

In 1867, he was elected to the House of Commons of Canada for the Nova Scotia riding of Cape Breton as a member of the Anti-Confederation Party. He was defeated in 1872.

In 1872, he was appointed a puisne judge of the Court of Queen's Bench of Manitoba. McKeagney died in St. Andrews, New Brunswick.

== Election results ==
1872 Canadian federal election: Cape Breton
Party	Candidate	Votes	%	Elected
Conservative	Newton LeGayet Mackay	1,240	30.30	✓
Conservative	William McDonald	1,038	25.37	✓
Liberal–Conservative	Hugh McLeod	932	22.78	
Liberal–Conservative	James Charles McKeagney	882	21.55	
Total valid votes		4,092	–	
Source: Library of Parliament

1867 Canadian federal election: Cape Breton
Party	Candidate	Votes
Anti-Confederation	Hon. James McKeagney	acclaimed
Total valid votes		–
This electoral district was created by the British North America Act, 1867 from the colonial Province of Nova Scotia'a Cape Breton electoral district. Neither of the incumbents ran in this election.
Source: Library of Parliament
