= Malagawatch =

Community in Nova Scotia, Canada

Coordinates: 45°50′17.05″N 60°59′15.66″W

Malagawatch in Nova Scotia

Malagawatch is a small community in the Canadian province of Nova Scotia, located in Inverness County on Cape Breton Island. The name is derived from a Mi'kmaq word.
