= Hugh McLeod (Canadian minister) =

Scottish-born Canadian minister (1803–1894)

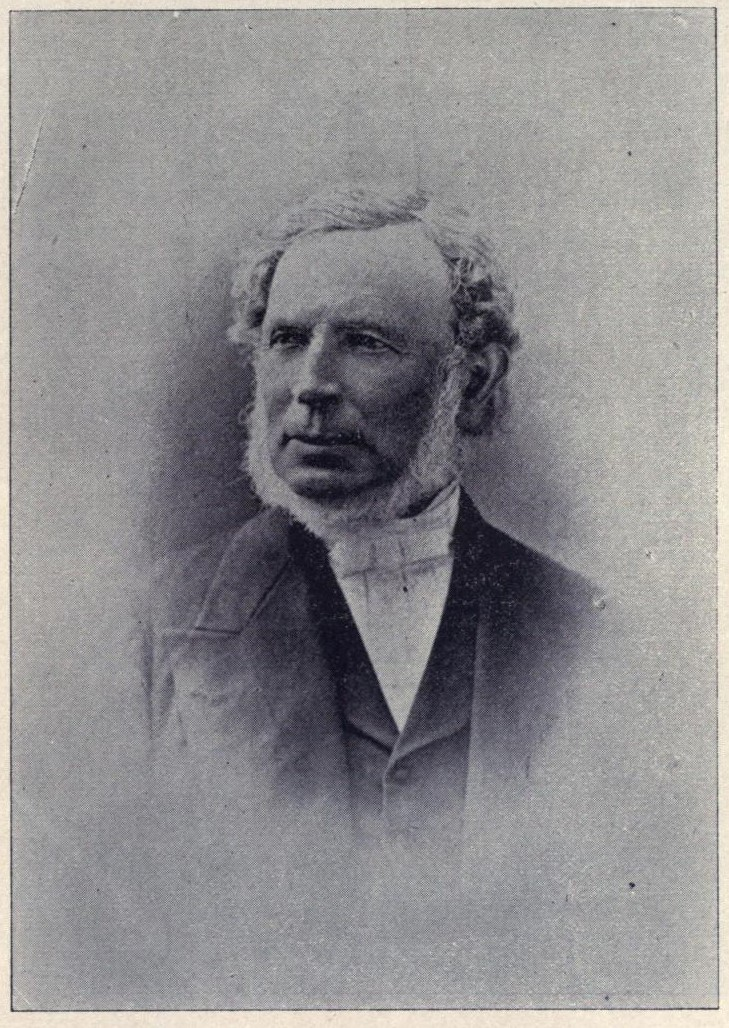

Hugh McLeod (April 23, 1803 – January 23, 1894) was a Scottish-born Canadian Presbyterian minister who was a founder of the Scottish Free Church in Canada.

== Early years ==
Hugh McLeod was born April 23, 1803, in Rhitongue, Sutherland, Scotland. In 1822, he started his education at King's College, Aberdeen and The Hall of Edinburgh. McLeod acquired a Master of Arts degree in 1826. He continued to study theology at King's College until 1830.

In 1831, McLeod was licensed to preach by the Presbytery of Tongue in Church of Scotland. In 1832, he was ordained and inducted as minister of Melness and Eriboll. In 1836 he was inducted to the Gaelic Church of Edinburgh after being assigned there by the Presbytery of that city. After several years, McLeod moved to Logie Easter, Ross-shire.

In 1841, McLeod married Catherine Ross, the daughter of the Reverend Hugh Ross of Fearn, Ross-shire.

On May 18, 1843, in Edinburgh, McLeod was one of 450 Scottish ministers who left the Church of Scotland in what became known as the Disruption of 1843". They established the Free Church of Scotland.

== Ministry in Canada ==
In 1845, the Fee Church dispatched McLeod to Nova Scotia and Eastern Canada on a brief mission as their deputy. In 1848, he went to Cape Breton in Nova Scotia.

After McLeod returned to Scotland, the Cape Breton congregation began corresponding with McLeod and the Colonial Committee of the Free Church. They indicated their desire to establish a "call", a formalized request for him to become their minister. The right of congregations to choose their own minister was a central tenet of the new Free Church.

Moved by the "unanimous desire of an immense territory", McLeod accepted the position in Cape Breton. On August 25, 1850, McLeod, his wife Catherine and three children arrived in Sydney, Nova Scotia. On October 2, he was inducted into the pastorate of the Mira congregation at Mira Ferry. Over 2,000 parishioners attended from all over Cape Breton. It was written to be "a day of joy and gladness" "never to be forgotten" for "one of the ablest preachers in Scotland" was sent to live among them by "the Great Shepherd", an answer to so many hopes and prayers. It was estimated that McLeod's congregation included 500 families and approximately 3000 people.

In 1854, McLeod acquired a Doctorate of Divinity from the University of Indiana.

McLeod served as the only pastor in Cape Breton until 1864, when another minister arrived. He retired from the ministry in 1885.

McLeod was elected 20 times as Moderator of the Presbytery, four times Moderator of the Synod, and once Moderator of the General Assembly. He delivered 6,000 sermons, baptized over 2,000 people, received 1200 people into full communion, and performed 800 marriages."

It is also written that McLeod's interests extended far beyond just his pastoral charges and that he was deeply concerned with all aspect of his community's welfare especially "education and moral reform." Civil and political matters occupied his regular attention and it is written he had a "reputation of profound scholarship."

McLeod died on January 23, 1894, aged 91. He had eleven children, "six of whom" occupied "various positions of trust in the country" including two members of parliament (Hugh and William Mackenzie).
