= Hugh McLeod (footballer) =

Scottish footballer

Personal information
- Full name: Hugh Ross McLeod
- Date of birth: 1 November 1907
- Place of birth: Tain, Scotland
- Date of death: 23 April 1929 (aged 21)
- Place of death: Scotland
- Position: Right back

Senior career*
Years	Team	Apps	(Gls)
1936–1939	Queen's Park	13	(0)

International career
1928	Scotland Amateurs	1	(0)
- * Club domestic league appearances and goals

Hugh Ross McLeod (1 November 1907 – 23 April 1929) was a Scottish amateur footballer who played in the Scottish League for Queen's Park as a right back. He was capped by Scotland at amateur level.

== Personal life ==
McLeod died of an attack of rheumatic fever while a student at the University of Edinburgh.
