= Cape Breton (federal electoral district) =

Former federal electoral district in Nova Scotia, Canada

Nova Scotia electoral district

Defunct federal electoral district
- Legislature: House of Commons
- District created: 1867
- District abolished: 1903
- First contested: 1867
- Last contested: 1900

Demographics
- Census division: Cape Breton

Cape Breton was a federal electoral district in Nova Scotia, Canada, that was represented in the House of Commons of Canada from 1867 to 1904. It was created as part of the British North America Act, 1867.

The district consisted of the county of Cape Breton and initially returned one member, but returned two members from 1872 until its dissolution. It was abolished when it was redistributed into Cape Breton South and North Cape Breton and Victoria ridings in 1903.

== Geography ==
The Cape Breton riding was set by the British North America Act, 1867 to consist of Cape Breton County. The county was legally defined in 1852 as:

all that part of the late county of Cape Breton to the southward of a line commencing at the entrance of a large stream that falls into the sea, about three miles to the westward of Point Ancomi, at the eastern extremity of the Island of Boularderie, and following the middle of the stream upwards, until it intersects the present highway between the great and little Bras d'Or; thence running parallel to the rear line of the front lot, on the north side of Boularderie, until it comes to the southwestern corner of the Reverend James Fraser's lot, on the north side thence south twenty degrees east, to the southeastern shore of Boularderie, and to continue on the same course to the middle of the Bras d'Or lake thence up the middle thereof westerly, to the middle of the strait of Barra thence following the mid channel thereof to the western end of the Strait thence in a direct line to the line at or near Point Malagawactchkt [sic] that separates the county of Cape Breton from the County of Inverness.

The boundaries were not changed during the 1872 electoral redistribution, but now the riding would return two members to Parliament. No changes occurred during the electoral redistributions of 1882 or 1892. This riding was dissolved and redistributed into the ridings of Cape Breton South and North Cape Breton and Victoria in the 1903 electoral redistribution.

== Members of Parliament ==
Parliament	Years	Member	Party	Member	Party
Cape Breton
1st	1867 – 1869 (Note: The Anti-Confederation Party dissolved in 1869, and James McKeagney joined the Liberal-Conservative Party.)	James Charles McKeagney	Anti-Confederate		
1st	1869 – 1872	James Charles McKeagney	Liberal–Conservative		
2nd	1872 – 1873 (Note: Newton LeGayet Mackay crossed the floor to the Liberals in 1873 in the aftermath of the Pacific Scandal.)	Newton LeGayet Mackay	Conservative	William McDonald	Conservative
2nd	1873 – 1874	Newton LeGayet Mackay	Liberal	William McDonald	Conservative
3rd	1874 – 1878	Newton LeGayet Mackay	Liberal	William McDonald	Conservative
4th	1878 – 1879 (Note: Hugh McLeod died in office on 5 August 1879. His successor was determined in a by-election held on 23 October.)	Hugh McLeod	Liberal–Conservative	William McDonald	Conservative
4th	1879 – 1882	William Mackenzie McLeod	Liberal–Conservative	William McDonald	Conservative
5th	1882 – 1884 (Note: William McDonald was appointed to the Senate in 1884. His successor was determined in a by-election held on 3 July.)	Murray Dodd	Conservative	William McDonald	Conservative
5th	1884 – 1887	Murray Dodd	Conservative	Hector Francis McDougall	Liberal–Conservative
6th	1887 – 1891	David MacKeen	Conservative	Hector Francis McDougall	Liberal–Conservative
7th	1891 – 1895 (Note: David MacKeen resigned his seat on 18 December 1895 to provide a seat for Charles Tupper, who was acclaimed in a by-election on 4 February 1896.)	David MacKeen	Conservative	Hector Francis McDougall	Liberal–Conservative
7th	1896 – 1896	Charles Tupper	Conservative	Hector Francis McDougall	Liberal–Conservative
8th	1896 – 1900	Charles Tupper	Conservative	Hector Francis McDougall	Liberal–Conservative
9th	1900 – 1904	Alexander Johnston	Liberal	Arthur Samuel Kendall	Liberal
Riding dissolved into Cape Breton South (1904–1917) and Cape Breton North and Victoria (1904–1925)

== Election results ==
=== 1900 ===
1900 Canadian federal election
Party	Candidate	Votes	%	Elected
Liberal	Alexander Johnston	3,922	25.99	✓
Liberal	Arthur Samuel Kendall	3,890	25.78	✓
Conservative	Charles Tupper	3,672	24.34	
Liberal–Conservative	Hector Francis McDougall	3,604	23.89	
Total valid votes		15,088	–	
Source: Library of Parliament

=== 1896 by-election ===
Canadian federal by-election, 4 February 1896 On David MacKeen's resignation to provide a seat for Sir Charles Tupper, 18 December 1895
Party	Candidate	Votes
Conservative	Charles Tupper	acclaimed

=== 1896 ===
1896 Canadian federal election
Party	Candidate	Votes	%	Elected
Conservative	Charles Tupper	3,630	29.75	✓
Liberal–Conservative	Hector Francis McDougall	3,430	28.11	✓
Liberal	Arthur Samuel Kendall	2,813	23.06	
Liberal	Joseph McPherson	2,328	19.08	
Total valid votes		12,201	–	
Source: Library of Parliament

=== 1891 ===
1891 Canadian federal election
Party	Candidate	Votes	%	Elected
Conservative	David MacKeen	2,889	29.45	✓
Liberal–Conservative	Hector Francis McDougall	2,681	27.33	✓
Liberal	George Henry Murray	2,161	22.03	
Liberal	Joseph McPherson	2,078	21.18	
Total valid votes		9,809	–	
Source: Library of Parliament

=== 1887 ===
1887 Canadian federal election
Party	Candidate	Votes	%	Elected
Liberal–Conservative	Hector Francis McDougall	1,883	21.97	✓
Conservative	David MacKeen	1,873	21.86	✓
Liberal	George Henry Murray	1,703	19.87	
Liberal	Michael Slattery	1,071	12.50	
Independent	Joseph A. Gillis	896	10.46	
Independent	John K. McLeod	606	7.07	
Independent	Ebenezer Tilton Moseley	538	6.28	
Total valid votes		8,570	–	
Source: Library of Parliament

=== 1884 by-election ===
Canadian federal by-election, 3 July 1884 On William McDonald being called to the Senate
Party	Candidate	Votes	%
Liberal–Conservative	Hector Francis McDougall	1,395	52.84
Liberal	Newton LeGayet Mackay	1,245	47.16
Total valid votes		2,640	–

=== 1882 ===
1882 Canadian federal election
Party	Candidate	Votes	%	Elected
Conservative	William McDonald	1,297	23.14	✓
Conservative	Murray Dodd	1,237	22.07	✓
Liberal–Conservative	William Mackenzie McLeod	1,124	20.05	
Liberal	Newton LeGayet Mackay	1,013	18.07	
Liberal–Conservative	Hector Francis McDougall	934	16.66	
Total valid votes		5,605	–	
Source: Library of Parliament

=== 1879 by-election ===
Canadian federal by-election, 23 October 1879 On Hugh McLeod's death, 5 August 1879
Party	Candidate	Votes	%
Liberal–Conservative	William Mackenzie McLeod	1,094	39.65
Liberal	Newton LeGayet Mackay	866	31.39
Conservative	Murray Dodd	799	28.96
Total valid votes		2,759	–

=== 1878 ===
1878 Canadian federal election
Party	Candidate	Votes	%	Elected
Liberal–Conservative	Hugh McLeod	2,056	34.52	✓
Conservative	William McDonald	2,051	34.44	✓
Liberal	Newton LeGayet Mackay	1,153	19.36	
Unknown	Walter Young	696	11.69	
Total valid votes		5,956	–	
Source: Library of Parliament

=== 1874 ===
1874 Canadian federal election
Party	Candidate	Votes	%	Elected
Conservative	William McDonald	1,251	35.79	✓
Liberal	Newton LeGayet Mackay	1,136	32.50	✓
Liberal–Conservative	Hugh McLeod	1,108	31.70	
Total valid votes		3,495	–	
Source: Library of Parliament

=== 1872 ===
1872 Canadian federal election
Party	Candidate	Votes	%	Elected
Conservative	Newton LeGayet Mackay	1,240	30.30	✓
Conservative	William McDonald	1,038	25.37	✓
Liberal–Conservative	Hugh McLeod	932	22.78	
Liberal–Conservative	James Charles McKeagney	882	21.55	
Total valid votes		4,092	–	
Source: Library of Parliament

=== 1867 ===
1867 Canadian federal election
Party	Candidate	Votes
Anti-Confederation	Hon. James McKeagney	acclaimed
Total valid votes		–
This electoral district was created by the British North America Act, 1867 from the colonial Province of Nova Scotia'a Cape Breton electoral district. Neither of the incumbents ran in this election.
Source: Library of Parliament

== See also ==
- List of Canadian electoral districts
- Historical federal electoral districts of Canada
