= Newton LeGayet Mackay =

Canadian politician (1832–1886)

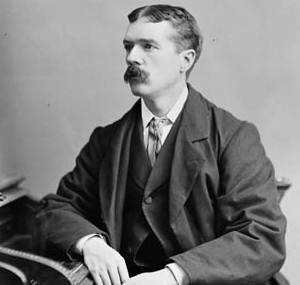
Newton LeGayet Mackay Source: Library and Archives Canada

Newton LeGayet Mackay (1832 – May 20, 1886) was a Canadian lawyer and political figure. He represented Cape Breton in the House of Commons of Canada from 1872 to 1878 as a Conservative and then Liberal member.

He was born in Halifax, Nova Scotia, the son of William McKay, and was educated there. Mackay was called to the Nova Scotia bar in 1859 and named a Queen's Counsel in 1872. He ran unsuccessfully for a seat in the Nova Scotia assembly in 1867 and 1871 before he was elected to the House of Commons. Mackay became a Liberal following the Pacific Scandal. After his defeat by Hugh McLeod in 1878, he was an unsuccessful candidate in each subsequent federal election until his death in 1886 in Sydney. In 1879, he married Kate Bown. Mackay served as treasurer for Cape Breton County.

== Electoral record ==
By-election on 3 July 1884 On Mr. McDonald being called to the Senate
Party	Candidate	Votes
Liberal–Conservative	Hector Francis McDougall	1,395
Liberal	Newton LeGayet Mackay	1,245

1882 Canadian federal election: Cape Breton
Party	Candidate	Votes	%	Elected
Conservative	William McDonald	1,297	–	✓
Conservative	Murray Dodd	1,237	–	✓
Liberal–Conservative	William Mackenzie McLeod	1,124		
Liberal	Newton LeGayet Mackay	1,013		
Liberal–Conservative	Hector Francis McDougall	934		

By-election on 23 October 1879 On Mr. McLeod's death, 5 August 1879
Party	Candidate	Votes
Liberal–Conservative	William Mackenzie McLeod	1,094
Liberal	Newton LeGayet Mackay	866
Conservative	Murray Dodd	799

1878 Canadian federal election: Cape Breton
Party	Candidate	Votes	%	Elected
Liberal–Conservative	Hugh McLeod	2,056	–	✓
Conservative	William McDonald	2,051	–	✓
Liberal	Newton LeGayet Mackay	1,153		
Unknown	Walter Young	696		
Source: Canadian Elections Database

1874 Canadian federal election: Cape Breton
Party	Candidate	Votes	%	Elected
Conservative	William McDonald	1,251	–	✓
Liberal	Newton LeGayet Mackay	1,136	–	✓
Liberal–Conservative	Hugh McLeod	1,108	–	
Source: Canadian Elections Database

1872 Canadian federal election: Cape Breton
Party	Candidate	Votes	%	Elected
Conservative	Newton LeGayet MacKay	1,240	–	✓
Conservative	William McDonald	1,038	–	✓
Liberal–Conservative	Hugh McLeod	932		
Liberal–Conservative	James McKeagney	882		
Source: Canadian Elections Database
