= Arthur Samuel Kendall =

Canadian physician and politician (1861–1944)

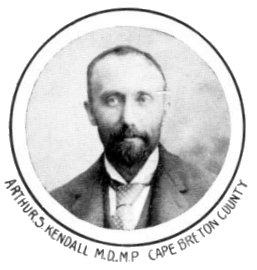
Dr. Arthur Samuel Kendall, MP for Cape Breton County from 1900 to 1904.

Arthur Samuel Kendall (March 25, 1861 – July 18, 1944) was a Canadian physician and politician in Nova Scotia.

== Early life ==
He was born in Sydney, Nova Scotia as the son of the Reverend S. F. Kendall and Emily Kendall.

== Education ==
Kendall educated from following institutions:

- Sydney Academy, Mount Allison College
- Halifax Medical College
- Bellevue Hospital Medical School in New York City (Kendall got his M.D. degree from Bellevue in 1882)
- Guy's Hospital Medical School in London.

== Career ==
He became a member of the Royal College of Surgeons of England in 1884 and was also a medical health officer for Cape Breton. In 1888, Kendall served as a town councillor for Sydney. In 1896, Kendall ran unsuccessfully for a seat in the House of Commons. He represented Cape Breton County in the Nova Scotia House of Assembly from 1897 to 1900 and from 1904 to 1911.

A social reformer, he was concerned about poverty and the impact of industrialization on Cape Breton Island. He supported improving workers' living conditions, old-age pensions, a shorter work week and a workmen's compensation act. He was nicknamed the "miner's friend" because of his support for coal mine workers.

=== Political career ===
He represented Cape Breton in the House of Commons of Canada from 1900 to 1904 as a Liberal member.

==== Elections ====
1900 Canadian federal election: Cape Breton
Party	Candidate	Votes	%	Elected
Liberal	Alexander Johnston	3,922	25.99	✓
Liberal	Arthur Samuel Kendall	3,890	25.78	✓
Conservative	Charles Tupper	3,672	24.34	
Liberal–Conservative	Hector Francis McDougall	3,604	23.89	
Total valid votes		15,088	–	
Source: Library of Parliament

1896 Canadian federal election: Cape Breton
Party	Candidate	Votes	%	Elected
Conservative	Charles Tupper	3,630	29.75	✓
Liberal–Conservative	Hector Francis McDougall	3,430	28.11	✓
Liberal	Arthur Samuel Kendall	2,813	23.06	
Liberal	Joseph McPherson	2,328	19.08	
Total valid votes		12,201	–	
Source: Library of Parliament

== Family ==
His brother, Henry Ernest Kendall, served as Lieutenant-Governor of Nova Scotia in the 1940s.

== Personal life ==
In 1886, Kendall married Mary Crawley, daughter of Reverend A. R. R. Crawley.
