= Robert Milne (Canadian politician) =

Canadian politician

Member of the Canadian Parliament for Neepawa
- In office 1921–1925
- Preceded by: Fred Langdon Davis
- Succeeded by: Thomas Gerow Murphy
- In office 1926–1930
- Preceded by: Thomas Gerow Murphy
- Succeeded by: Thomas Gerow Murphy

Personal details
- Born: August 19, 1881 Meikiwin, Manitoba, Canada
- Died: July 1, 1953 (aged 71)
- Party: Progressive Party
- Occupation: farmer

Robert Milne (August 19, 1881 – July 1, 1953) was a farmer who sat in House of Commons of Canada during the 1920s as a Progressive Party MP.

Milne attended Manitoba Agricultural College before becoming a farmer in Mekiwin. He was first elected to Parliament in the 1921 federal election from Neepawa, was defeated in the 1925 election but regained his set in 1926 before being defeated for the final time in the 1930 federal election.
