= Thomas Gerow Murphy =

Canadian politician

The Honourable Thomas Gerow Murphy PC

Member of the Canadian Parliament for Neepawa
- In office 1925–1926
- Preceded by: Robert Milne
- Succeeded by: Robert Milne
- In office 1930–1935
- Preceded by: Robert Milne
- Succeeded by: Frederick Donald MacKenzie

Personal details
- Born: October 29, 1883 Northumberland County, Ontario
- Died: April 7, 1971 (aged 87)
- Party: Conservative
- Cabinet: Superintendent-General of Indian Affairs (1930–1935); Minister of the Interior (1930–1935)

Thomas Gerow Murphy, PC (October 29, 1883 – April 7, 1971) was a Canadian politician.

Born in Northumberland County, Ontario, he was a pharmacist before being elected to the House of Commons of Canada representing the Manitoba riding of Neepawa in the 1925 federal election. A Conservative, he was defeated in the 1926 election by Progressive Robert Milne. He defeated Milne in the 1930 federal election to return to Parliament and was appointed to the Cabinet of R.B. Bennett. He was defeated in the 1935 and 1940 elections. From 1930 to 1935, he was the Superintendent-General of Indian Affairs and Minister of the Interior.
