= Hugh MacLeod (minister) =

Scottish minister

- Born: 27 December 1730; Rossshire, Scotland
- Died: 22 May 1809 (aged 78); Glasgow, Scotland
- Education: Aberdeen University
- Occupation: minister
- Organization: Scottish Presbyterian
- Known for: Professor of Ecclesiastical History at Glasgow University
- Father: Norman MacLeod

Hugh MacLeod FRSE FSA (1730–1809) was a Scottish minister and Professor of Ecclesiastical History at Glasgow University.

== Life ==
He was born in Rossshire on 27 December 1730 the son of Norman MacLeod.

He studied theology at Aberdeen University graduating MA in 1755. From 1756 to 1759 he worked as the university's librarian. In 1778 he replaced Rev Dr William Wight as Professor of Church History at Glasgow University.

Aberdeen University granted him an honorary doctorate (DD) in 1780. In 1781 he was elected a Clerk of the Senate. In 1783 he was a founder member of the Royal Society of Edinburgh.

In 1796 William McTurk joined him as an assistant and replaced him as professor on his death.

He died at his lodgings at the university in Glasgow, Scotland on 22 May 1809.
