= Murray Dodd =

Canadian politician (1843–1905)

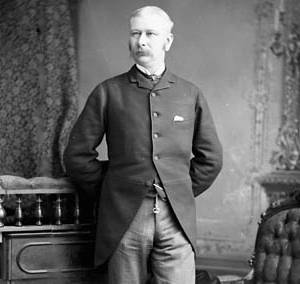
Murray Dodd Source: Library and Archives Canada

Murray Dodd (May 23, 1843 – August 25, 1905) was a lawyer, judge and political figure in Nova Scotia, Canada. He represented Cape Breton in the House of Commons of Canada from 1882 to 1887 as a Conservative member.

He was born in Sydney, Nova Scotia, the son of judge Edmund Murray Dodd and Caroline Maria Ritchie, a granddaughter of David Mathews, the Loyalist Mayor of New York City under the British during the American Revolution, and a descendant of the prominent Schuyler family of New York City. He was educated in Sydney and Sackville. He was called to the Nova Scotia bar in 1865 and practised in Sydney. In 1879, he married Laura Isabel Archibald. The following year, Dodd was named Queen's Counsel. He was registrar for the county probate court from 1867 to 1872, when he was named judge in the same court. He resigned in 1879 to run unsuccessfully for a seat in the House of Commons. In 1888, he was named County Court Judge for Division number 7 in Nova Scotia. In 1893 he became one of the founding members of the Sydney Lawn Tennis Club which was incorporated by an Act of the Nova Scotia Legislature. He died in Sydney at the age of 61 while still serving as a judge.

By-election on 23 October 1879 On Mr. McLeod's death, 5 August 1879
Party	Candidate	Votes
Liberal–Conservative	William Mackenzie McLeod	1,094
Liberal	Newton LeGayet Mackay	866
Conservative	Murray Dodd	799
