= William Mackenzie McLeod =

Canadian politician (1854–1932)

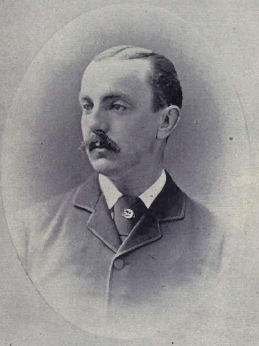

Member of the Canadian Parliament for Cape Breton
- In office 1879–1882 Serving with William McDonald
- Preceded by: Hugh McLeod
- Succeeded by: Murray Dodd

Personal details
- Born: July 4, 1854 Sydney, Nova Scotia
- Died: June 13, 1932 (aged 77)
- Party: Liberal-Conservative
- Relations: Hugh McLeod, brother

William Mackenzie McLeod (July 4, 1854 – June 13, 1932) was a Canadian physician and politician.

Born in Sydney, Nova Scotia, McLeod was educated at Sydney Academy and Dalhousie University. He took his medical course in New York City at Bellevue Hospital Medical College graduating in 1875. In 1889 and 1890 he also took special courses in the diseases of the eye, ear, nose and throat at New York Post-Graduate Medical School and Hospital. From 1875 until 1879, he practiced his profession in Sydney, when he entered the political field and was elected to the House of Commons of Canada succeeding his brother, Hugh McLeod, to represent the riding of Cape Breton. A Liberal-Conservative, he was defeated in 1882. In 1883, he was appointed Medical Superintendent of Quarantine at Sydney. In 1886, he organized the Sydney Battery of Field Artillery (Canadian Militia), of which he was the Major in command.

He was president of the Cape Breton Medical Society, and a member of the Nova Scotia Medical Society. In religion he was a Presbyterian, the son of Rev. Hugh McLeod (Canadian minister), DD, who came from Tain, Scotland in 1849 and was a Free Church leader in Mira Ferry, Cape Breton; in 1877 was elected as the third Moderator of the Presbyterian Church in Canada. His second wife, née Jessie McIntosh (1867–1935) was a key leader in the Women's Missionary Society, Eastern Division, and opposed the formation of the United Church of Canada.

By-election on 23 October 1879 On Mr. McLeod's death, 5 August 1879
Party	Candidate	Votes
Liberal–Conservative	William Mackenzie McLeod	1,094
Liberal	Newton LeGayet Mackay	866
Conservative	Murray Dodd	799
