= Hugh McLeod (politician) =

Canadian politician (1843–1879)

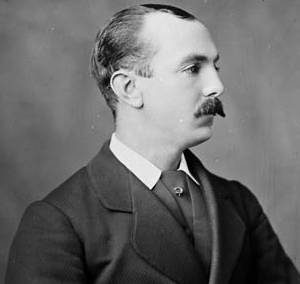
Hugh McLeod Source: Library and Archives Canada

Hugh McLeod (November 17, 1843 – August 6, 1879) was a Scottish-born lawyer and political figure in Nova Scotia, Canada. He represented Cape Breton in the House of Commons of Canada from 1878 to 1879 as a Liberal-Conservative member.

He was born in Logie Easter Parish, Ross-shire, the son of the Reverend Hugh McLeod (Canadian minister), DD (Moderator of the Presbyterian Church in Canada in 1877) and Catherine Ross, and came to Canada with his family in 1850. He was educated in Sydney, Truro and at McGill University. McLeod was called to the Nova Scotia bar in 1868. He ran unsuccessfully for a seat in the House of Commons in 1872 and 1874. He died in office at the age of 36.

His brother William Mackenzie McLeod succeeded him in the House of Commons, serving until 1882.

In 2016, the Dalhousie University created the annual Hugh McLeod Award —named in honor of the politician— to recognize talented political science students.

== Electoral record ==
1878 Canadian federal election: Cape Breton
Party	Candidate	Votes	%	Elected
Liberal–Conservative	Hugh McLeod	2,056	–	✓
Conservative	William McDonald	2,051	–	✓
Liberal	Newton LeGayet Mackay	1,153		
Unknown	Walter Young	696		
Source: Canadian Elections Database

1874 Canadian federal election: Cape Breton
Party	Candidate	Votes	%	Elected
Conservative	William McDonald	1,251	–	✓
Liberal	Newton LeGayet Mackay	1,136	–	✓
Liberal–Conservative	Hugh McLeod	1,108	–	
Source: Canadian Elections Database

1872 Canadian federal election: Cape Breton
Party	Candidate	Votes	%	Elected
Conservative	Newton LeGayet MacKay	1,240	–	✓
Conservative	William McDonald	1,038	–	✓
Liberal–Conservative	Hugh McLeod	932		
Liberal–Conservative	James McKeagney	882		
Source: Canadian Elections Database

Preceded by Newton LeGayet Mackay	Member of Parliament for Cape Breton; 1878–1879	Succeeded by William Mackenzie McLeod
