= Cape Breton (provincial electoral district) =

Former provincial electoral district in Nova Scotia, Canada

Nova Scotia electoral district

Defunct provincial electoral district
- Legislature: Nova Scotia House of Assembly
- District created: 1867
- District abolished: 1925
- Last contested: 1920

Cape Breton was a provincial electoral district in Nova Scotia, Canada, from 1867 to 1925. For the bulk of its existence, the district elected two members to the Nova Scotia House of Assembly. In 1925, Cape Breton and neighbouring Richmond County were divided into three electoral districts: Cape Breton East, Cape Breton Centre, and Richmond—West Cape Breton.

== Members of the Legislative Assembly ==
Cape Breton elected the following members to the Legislative Assembly. Except for a brief period from 1916 to 1925 when it elected four members, the Cape Breton district always elected two members to the Nova Scotia House of Assembly.

Legislature	Years	Member	Party
37th	1920–1925	William Forman Waye	Labour
37th	1920–1925	Joseph Steele	Labour
37th	1920–1925	Arthur R. Richardson	Farmer's Party
37th	1920–1925	Daniel W. Morrison	Independent Labour
36th	1916–1920	Neil Ferguson	Liberal-Conservative
36th	1916–1920	John Carey Douglas	Liberal-Conservative
36th	1916–1920	Daniel Alexander Cameron	Liberal
36th	1916–1920	Robert Hamilton Butts	Liberal-Conservative

Legislature	Years	Member	Party	Member	Party
35th	1911–1916	John Carey Douglas	Liberal-Conservative	Robert Hamilton Butts	Liberal-Conservative
34th	1906–1911	Arthur Samuel Kendall	Liberal	Neil J. Gillis	Liberal
33rd	1904–1906	Arthur Samuel Kendall	Liberal	Neil J. Gillis	Liberal
33rd	1901–1904	Daniel Duncan McKenzie	Liberal	Neil J. Gillis	Liberal
32nd	1900–1901	Daniel Duncan McKenzie	Liberal	Neil J. Gillis	Liberal
32nd	1897–1900	Arthur Samuel Kendall	Liberal	Alexander Johnston	Liberal
31st	1894–1897	John McCormick	Liberal-Conservative	William MacKay	Liberal-Conservative
30th	1890–1894	Joseph McPherson	Liberal	Angus J. MacDonald	Liberal
29th	1886–1890	Colin Chisholm	Liberal-Conservative	William MacKay	Liberal-Conservative
28th	1882–1886	Alonza J. White	Liberal	William Buchanan	Liberal
27th	1878–1882	Ebenezer Tilton Moseley	Liberal-Conservative	Hector Francis McDougall	Liberal-Conservative
26th	1874–1878	Ebenezer Tilton Moseley	Independent	Alonza J. White	Liberal
25th	1871-1874	John Fergusson	Liberal	Alonza J. White	Liberal
24th	1867–1871	John Fergusson	Anti-Confederation Party	Alonza J. White	Anti-Confederation Party

== Election results ==
=== 1920 ===
1920 Nova Scotia general election
Party	Candidate	Votes	%	Elected
Labour	D. W. Morrison	9,830	13.80%	✓
Labour	Joseph Steele	9,800	13.75%	✓
Labour	Forman Waye	9,407	13.20%	✓
Farmers' Party	Arthur R. Richardson	9,177	12.88%	✓
Liberal	William F. Carroll	6,471	9.08%	
Liberal	Daniel Alexander Cameron	5,729	8.04%	
Liberal	A. B. MacGillivray	5,334	7.49%	
Liberal	N. MacDonald	5,270		
Liberal–Conservative	Neil R. McArthur	2,809	3.94%	
Liberal–Conservative	A. C. MacCormick	2,749	3.86%	
Liberal–Conservative	Ewen MacKay Forbes	2,343	3.29%	
Liberal–Conservative	Charles B. Smith	2,338	3.28%	
Total		61,018	–	
Source(s) Source: Nova Scotia Legislature (2024). "Electoral History for Cape Breton County" (PDF). nslegislature.ca.

1916 Nova Scotia general election
Party	Candidate	Votes	%	Elected
Liberal–Conservative	John Carey Douglas	7,381	13.22%	✓
Liberal	Daniel Alexander Cameron	7,036	12.60%	✓
Liberal–Conservative	Robert Hamilton Butts	6,935	12.42%	✓
Liberal–Conservative	Neil Ferguson	6,885	12.33%	✓
Liberal	David James Hartigan	6,764	12.11%	
Liberal–Conservative	Finlay McDonald	6,721	12.04%	
Liberal	D. C. McDonald	6,692	11.98%	
Liberal	Michael T. Sullivan	6,390		
Labour	J. B. McLachlin	1,038	1.86%	
Total		54,804	–	
Source(s) Source: Nova Scotia Legislature (2024). "Electoral History for Cape Breton County" (PDF). nslegislature.ca.

1911 Nova Scotia general election
Party	Candidate	Votes	%	Elected
Liberal–Conservative	John Carey Douglas	6,252	25.05%	✓
Liberal–Conservative	Robert Hamilton Butts	6,246	25.03%	✓
Liberal	Arthur Samuel Kendall	5,987	23.99%	
Liberal	W. F. Carroll	5,756	23.07%	
Socialist	Alex McKinnon	713	2.86%	
Total		24,954	–	
Source(s) Source: Nova Scotia Legislature (2024). "Electoral History for Cape Breton County" (PDF). nslegislature.ca.

1906 Nova Scotia general election
Party	Candidate	Votes	%	Elected
Liberal	Arthur Samuel Kendall	5,225	26.66%	✓
Liberal	Neil J. Gillis	4,897	24.98%	✓
Liberal–Conservative	J. W. Madden	4,777	24.37%	
Liberal–Conservative	Robert Hamilton Butts	4,702	23.99%	
Total		19,601	–	
Source(s) Source: Nova Scotia Legislature (2024). "Electoral History for Cape Breton County" (PDF). nslegislature.ca.

Nova Scotia provincial by-election, 1904-12-15
Party	Candidate	Votes	%	Elected
Liberal	Arthur Samuel Kendall	4,270	67.24%	✓
Liberal	James Boyd	2,080	32.76%	
Total		6,350	–	
Source(s) Source: Nova Scotia Legislature (2024). "Electoral History for Cape Breton County" (PDF). nslegislature.ca.

1901 Nova Scotia general election
Party	Candidate	Votes	%	Elected
Liberal	Daniel Duncan McKenzie	3,840	32.29%	✓
Liberal	Neil J. Gillis	3,691	31.04%	✓
Liberal–Conservative	Colin McKinnon	2,205	18.54%	
Liberal–Conservative	Vincent Mullins	2,157	18.14%	
Total		11,893	–	
Source(s) Source: Nova Scotia Legislature (2024). "Electoral History for Cape Breton County" (PDF). nslegislature.ca.

Nova Scotia provincial by-election, 1900-12-12
Party	Candidate	Votes	%	Elected
Liberal	Daniel Duncan McKenzie	3,354	29.74%	✓
Liberal	Neil J. Gillis	3,161	28.03%	✓
Liberal–Conservative	Henry McDonald	2,493	22.10%	
Liberal–Conservative	Colin McKinnon	2,271	20.13%	
Total		11,279	–	
Source(s) Source: Nova Scotia Legislature (2024). "Electoral History for Cape Breton County" (PDF). nslegislature.ca.

1897 Nova Scotia general election
Party	Candidate	Votes	%	Elected
Liberal	Arthur Samuel Kendall	3,705	29.35%	✓
Liberal	Alexander Johnston	3,559	28.19%	✓
Liberal–Conservative	John McCormick	2,691	21.32%	
Liberal–Conservative	William MacKay	2,669	21.14%	
Total		12,624	–	
Source(s) Source: Nova Scotia Legislature (2024). "Electoral History for Cape Breton County" (PDF). nslegislature.ca.

1894 Nova Scotia general election
Party	Candidate	Votes	%	Elected
Liberal–Conservative	William MacKay	2,885	26.59%	✓
Liberal–Conservative	John McCormick	2,822	26.01%	✓
Liberal	Joseph McPherson	2,592	23.89%	
Liberal	Angus J. MacDonald	2,552	23.52%	
Total		10,851	–	
Source(s) Source: Nova Scotia Legislature (2024). "Electoral History for Cape Breton County" (PDF). nslegislature.ca.

Nova Scotia provincial by-election, 1891-03-05
Party	Candidate	Votes	%	Elected
Liberal	Joseph McPherson	1,975	55.17%	✓
Liberal–Conservative	John McCormick	1,605	44.83%	
Total		3,580	–	
Source(s) Source: Nova Scotia Legislature (2024). "Electoral History for Cape Breton County" (PDF). nslegislature.ca.

1890 Nova Scotia general election
Party	Candidate	Votes	%	Elected
Liberal	Angus J. MacDonald	2,681	28.23%	✓
Liberal	Joseph McPherson	2,579	27.15%	✓
Liberal–Conservative	William MacKay	2,141	22.54%	
Liberal–Conservative	Colin Chisholm	2,097	22.08%	
Total		9,498	–	
Source(s) Source: Nova Scotia Legislature (2024). "Electoral History for Cape Breton County" (PDF). nslegislature.ca.

1886 Nova Scotia general election
Party	Candidate	Votes	%	Elected
Liberal–Conservative	Colin Chisholm	1,633	31.45%	✓
Liberal–Conservative	William MacKay	1,562	30.08%	✓
Liberal	George H. Murray	1,253	24.13%	
Liberal	Ronald Gillies	745	14.35%	
Total		5,193	–	
Source(s) Source: Nova Scotia Legislature (2024). "Electoral History for Cape Breton County" (PDF). nslegislature.ca.

Nova Scotia provincial by-election, 1882-08-29
Party	Candidate	Votes	%	Elected
Liberal	Alonzo J. White	1,575	65.98%	✓
Liberal–Conservative	Colin Chisholm	812	34.02%	
Total		2,387	–	
Source(s) Source: Nova Scotia Legislature (2024). "Electoral History for Cape Breton County" (PDF). nslegislature.ca.

1882 Nova Scotia general election
Party	Candidate	Votes	%	Elected
Liberal	Alonzo J. White	1,600	28.83%	✓
Liberal	William Buchanan	1,579	28.46%	✓
Liberal–Conservative	Ebenezer Tilton Moseley	1,192	21.48%	
Liberal–Conservative	Colin Chisholm	1,178	21.23%	
Total		5,549	–	
Source(s) Source: Nova Scotia Legislature (2024). "Electoral History for Cape Breton County" (PDF). nslegislature.ca.

1878 Nova Scotia general election
Party	Candidate	Votes	%	Elected
Liberal–Conservative	Ebenezer Tilton Moseley	1,523	27.54%	✓
Liberal–Conservative	Hector Francis McDougall	1,027	18.57%	✓
Liberal	Alonzo J. White	930	16.82%	
Liberal–Conservative	J. H. Hearn	716	12.95%	
Liberal	D. McKenzie	614	11.10%	
Liberal–Conservative	Joseph McVarish	371	6.71%	
Liberal–Conservative	Michael McKinnon	349	6.31%	
Total		5,530	–	
Source(s) Source: Nova Scotia Legislature (2024). "Electoral History for Cape Breton County" (PDF). nslegislature.ca.

1874 Nova Scotia general election
Party	Candidate	Votes	%	Elected
Liberal	Alonzo J. White	1,129	34.19%	✓
Independent	Ebenezer Tilton Moseley	1,039	31.47%	✓
Liberal	John Fergusson	626	18.96%	
Liberal–Conservative	A. G. Hamilton	304	9.21%	
Liberal–Conservative	John Currie	204	6.18%	
Total		3,302	–	
Source(s) Source: Nova Scotia Legislature (2024). "Electoral History for Cape Breton County" (PDF). nslegislature.ca.

Nova Scotia provincial by-election, 1874-03-10
Party	Candidate	Votes	%	Elected
Liberal	Alonzo J. White	acclaimed	N/A	✓
Total			–	
Source(s) Source: Nova Scotia Legislature (2024). "Electoral History for Cape Breton County" (PDF). nslegislature.ca.

1871 Nova Scotia general election
Party	Candidate	Votes	%	Elected
Liberal	Alonzo J. White	1,329	42.26%	✓
Liberal	John Fergusson	992	31.54%	✓
Liberal–Conservative	Newton LeGayet Mackay	824	26.20%	
Total		3,145	–	
Source(s) Source: Nova Scotia Legislature (2024). "Electoral History for Cape Breton County" (PDF). nslegislature.ca.

1867 Nova Scotia general election
Party	Candidate	Votes	%	Elected
Anti-Confederation	Alonzo J. White	963	29.39%	✓
Anti-Confederation	John Fergusson	702	21.42%	✓
Confederation	Newton LeGayet Mackay	616	18.80%	
Confederation	P. Cadegan	525	16.02%	
Anti-Confederation	S. L. Purvis	471	14.37%	
Total		3,277	–	
Source(s) Source: Nova Scotia Legislature (2024). "Electoral History for Cape Breton County" (PDF). nslegislature.ca.

== See also ==
- List of Nova Scotia provincial electoral districts
- Canadian provincial electoral districts
