= George William Kyte =

Canadian politician

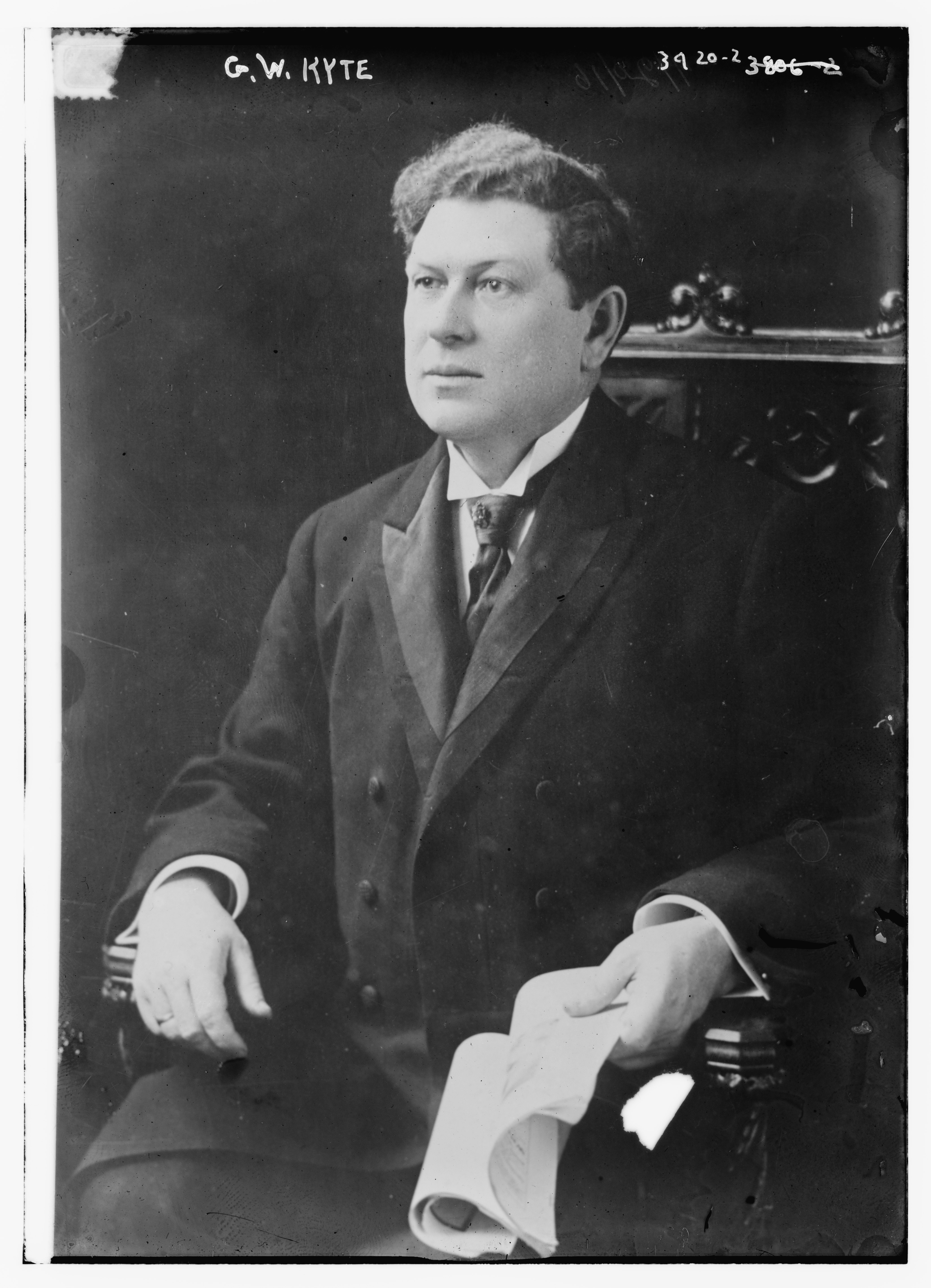

Member of the Canada Parliament for Richmond
- In office 1908–1917
- Preceded by: Duncan Finlayson

Member of the Canada Parliament for Cape Breton South and Richmond
- In office 1921–1925 Serving with William F. Carroll
- Preceded by: John Carey Douglas; Robert Hamilton Butts

Personal details
- Born: July 10, 1864 St. Peters, Nova Scotia
- Died: November 6, 1940 (aged 76)
- Party: Liberal
- Portfolio: Whip of the Liberal Party (1922–1924); Chief Government Whip (1922–1925)

George William Kyte, KC (July 10, 1864 – November 6, 1940) was a Canadian politician from the province of Nova Scotia.

Born in St. Peters, Richmond County, Nova Scotia, the son of John and Elizabeth (Robertson), Kyte was educated in public schools in St. Peter's and St. Francis Xavier University. He taught school for four years and then studied law in the office of C. F. McIsaac, K.C., in Antigonish, Nova Scotia. He was admitted to the Bar on November 16, 1891, and began practice of law in St. Peters in 1892. He was appointed Assistant Clerk, Nova Scotia House of Assembly in 1892. He was reappointed in 1895, 1898, and 1902. In 1903 he was appointed Clerk. He was made a King's Counsel by the Lieutenant Governor of Nova Scotia, Duncan Cameron Fraser, in 1908.

He resigned in 1908 to contest the electoral district of Richmond in the 1908 federal election as a Liberal candidate and was elected. He was re-elected in the 1911 election. He was defeated in 1917 in the riding of Cape Breton South and Richmond. He was elected in the 1921 election and defeated in the 1925 election for the electoral district of Richmond—West Cape Breton. He was Chief Government Whip from 1922 to 1925. Harry Raymond Fleming is his son-in-law.

== Kyte Charges ==
George Kyte also started the investigation of faulty weapon production during World War I, later titled The Kyte Charges in his name.

== Electoral record ==
1908 Canadian federal election: Richmond
Party	Candidate	Votes
Liberal	George William Kyte	1,279
Conservative	Roderick Ferguson	1,039

1911 Canadian federal election: Richmond
Party	Candidate	Votes
Liberal	George William Kyte	1,268
Conservative	Joseph Alexander Gillies	983

== See also ==
- Michael P. Fleming
