= Malcolm McLean (politician) =

Canadian politician

Member of Parliament for Melfort
- In office October 1925 – July 1930
- Preceded by: Malcolm McLean
- Succeeded by: Robert Weir

Member of Parliament for Melfort
- In office October 1935 – March 1940
- Preceded by: Robert Weir
- Succeeded by: Percy Wright

Personal details
- Born: 6 January 1883 Island of Islay, Scotland
- Died: 17 May 1942 (aged 59)
- Party: Liberal
- Profession: farmer

Malcolm McLean (6 January 1883 – 17 May 1942) was a Liberal party member of the House of Commons of Canada. He was born in Island of Islay, Scotland and became a farmer.

McLean moved to Canada in 1903. He was first elected to Parliament at the Melfort riding in the 1925 general election and was re-elected in 1926. McLean was defeated in 1930 by Robert Weir of the Conservative party. McLean won back the seat from Weir in the 1935 election and served one more term, the 18th Canadian Parliament, after which he was defeated by Percy Wright of the Co-operative Commonwealth Federation in the 1940 election.
