= Clarence Gillis =

Canadian politician (1895–1960)

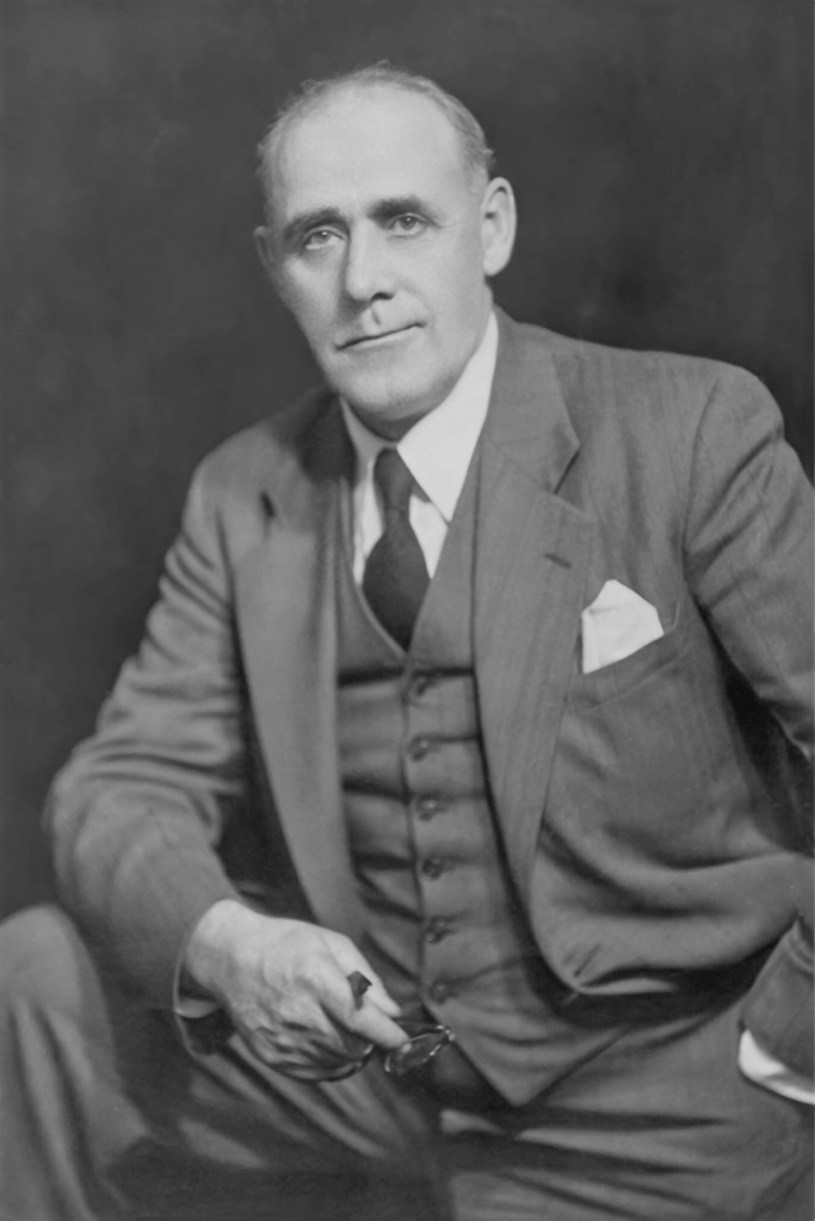
- Gillis in 1940

Member of Parliament
- In office 1940–1957
- Preceded by: David James Hartigan (Liberal)
- Succeeded by: Donald MacInnis (Conservative)
- Constituency: Cape Breton South

Personal details
- Born: October 3, 1895 Londonderry, Nova Scotia, Canada
- Died: December 17, 1960 (aged 65) Glace Bay, Nova Scotia, Canada
- Party: Co-operative Commonwealth Federation
- Spouses: Mamie Gillis (died 1953); Theresa Sargeant (m. 1958)
- Profession: Coal Miner/Trade unionist

Clarence (Clarie) Gillis (October 3, 1895 – December 17, 1960) was a Canadian social democratic politician and trade unionist from Cape Breton Island, Nova Scotia. He was born on Nova Scotia's mainland but grew up in Cape Breton. He worked in the island's underground coal mines operated by the British Empire Steel and Coal Company (BESCO). He also served as a member of the infantry in the Canadian Corps in Flanders during the First World War. After the war, he returned to the coal mines and became an official with the mine's United Mine Workers of America (UMW) union. In 1938, he helped bring UMW Local 26 into the Co-operative Commonwealth Federation (CCF), becoming the first labour local to affiliate with the party. In 1940, he became the first CCF member elected to the House of Commons of Canada, east of Manitoba. (Note: Agnes Macphail, though a supporter of the CCF, was elected to the House of Commons as a member of the United Farmers of Ontario (UFO)-Labour party, not the CCF. Although, she did sit with the CCF caucus during her final years in parliament.) While serving in the House, he was known as its leading voice championing labour issues. He was also a main voice for social rights during his 17 years in Parliament. His most notable achievement was securing the funding that allowed the building of a fixed link between Nova Scotia's mainland and Cape Breton Island at the Strait of Canso: the Canso Causeway. After winning four straight elections, he was defeated in 1957 and died three years later in Glace Bay, Nova Scotia.

== Early life and World War I service ==
Clarence Gillis was born on the Nova Scotia mainland, in the town of Londonderry, in 1895. His father, J.H. Gillis, relocated the family to the Industrial Cape Breton region in 1904. J.H. Gillis was employed in the coal mines and was an associate of union leader J. B. McLachlan. Clarie, as he was commonly known, commenced his employment in the region’s coal mines in 1913. The following year, he enlisted in the Canadian Corps and progressed from private to acting lieutenant. He sustained a head injury from shrapnel during the Battle of Flanders. He made a full recovery and resumed his work in the mines after the war.

== Trade unionist and federal MP ==
The period from 1920 and 1940 was the time that Gillis rose through the ranks of the United Mine Workers of America (UMW) Local 26. He represented the federal riding of Cape Breton South, which included the city of Sydney, the towns of Glace Bay, New Waterford, Dominion and surrounding areas from 1940 until his defeat in the 1957 election.

Gillis was known as a defender of the working man and is credited with popularizing the Mouseland political parable. In 1943, The Ottawa Citizen had an editorial that attacked Cape Breton miners for asking for more butter during wartime rationing. As Gillis pointed out in the House of Commons, Cape Breton miners had amongst the highest enlistment rates in Canada, and their families were needy, not just for butter, but just about every kind of basic food-stuff. His constant support for workers did eventually bring about changes in the latter part of World War II.

When labour unions were being attacked in Parliament, Gillis was usually the one called upon to defend them. In 1942, during the speech from the throne debate, H. A. Bruce, the Conservative Party member from Toronto's Parkdale electoral district, was a typical critic of the Canadian Congress of Labor (CCL). Parliamentarians started attacking the American Congress of Industrial Organizations (CIO), which the CCL was affiliated with, and claiming that its union members were hurting the war effort. Gillis stood up in Parliament and actively defended the unions, reminding the Commons that he had been a unionist for over 25 years. Scenes like this were common for Gillis during this period.

He was one of the few MPs who attacked the Canadian government's racist policies towards Japanese Canadians in the period from 1942 to 1945. In the House of Commons of Canada, he stated the following:

While we know that the war with Japan is a serious matter and that many atrocities have been committed by the people of that country, there is no reason why we should try to duplicate the performances of that country.

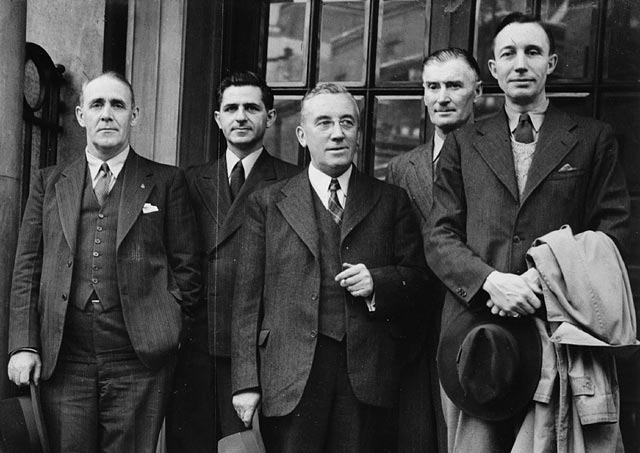
Federal Co-operative Commonwealth Federation (CCF) delegation attending the September 1944 Conference of Commonwealth Labour Parties in London, England. Pictured from Left to right: Clarie Gillis, MP for Cape Breton South; David Lewis, National Secretary; M.J. Coldwell, National Leader, MP for Rosetown—Biggar; Percy E. Wright, MP for Melfort; and Frank Scott, National Chairman.

His defence of Japanese Canadians arose out of the July 1944 debate on whether to allow them to vote. After questioning from prime minister William Lyon Mackenzie King, Gillis pointed out that the CCF's official position is that all Canadians, especially those born in Canada, should have the full rights of that citizenship and have the franchise to vote. In the end, the Liberal government ignored the CCF's pleas and passed a law to restrict voting for Japanese Canadians.

One of his most notable achievements while in Parliament, was getting federal government funding to build the Canso Causeway to bridge mainland Nova Scotia to Cape Breton Island. The causeway was opened on August 13, 1955, and Gillis was part of the opening ceremonies, though his part was downplayed in the media at the time, as recently deceased former Nova Scotia premier Angus L. MacDonald was given most of the credit.

== Personal life and death ==
He failed to get re-elected in the general election of 1957. He ran for parliament for the last time in 1958, the year of the Diefenbaker-Sweep, and lost the election. He retired from politics after this defeat. His first wife, Maime Gillis, née Stewart, died in 1953. He married his second wife, Theresa Sargeant in 1958. He died of pleurisy, in the Glace Bay Hospital, on December 17, 1960, in Cape Breton.

== Election results ==
1940 Canadian federal election
Party	Candidate	Votes
Co-operative Commonwealth	GILLIS, Clarence	11,582
Liberal	HARTIGAN, David James	11,364
National Government	NUNN, Joseph Clyde	9,719

1945 Canadian federal election
Party	Candidate	Votes
Co-operative Commonwealth	GILLIS, Clarence	16,575
Liberal	HARTIGAN, David James	10,529
Progressive Conservative	BUCKLEY, Donald Joseph	7,343
Labor–Progressive	MADDEN, James	917

1949 Canadian federal election
Party	Candidate	Votes
Co-operative Commonwealth	GILLIS, Clarence	15,057
Liberal	SLAVEN, George Benjamin	12,608
Progressive Conservative	CADEGAN, Perry Lewis	5,618

1953 Canadian federal election
Party	Candidate	Votes
Co-operative Commonwealth	GILLIS, Clarence	14,971
Liberal	MCINTYRE, Leo	10,151
Progressive Conservative	FERGUSSON, Layton	4,726
Labor–Progressive	MACEACHERN, Ronald George	794

1957 Canadian federal election
Party	Candidate	Votes
Progressive Conservative	MACINNIS, Donald	14,894
Liberal	MCINTYRE, Leo	11,539
Co-operative Commonwealth	GILLIS, Clarence	10,447

1958 Canadian federal election
Party	Candidate	Votes
Progressive Conservative	MACINNIS, Donald	17,636
Co-operative Commonwealth	GILLIS, Clarence	13,044
Liberal	DUBINSKY, J. Louis	7,754
