= Duncan Finlayson =

Canadian politician

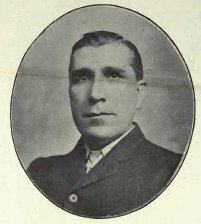

Member of the Canadian Parliament for Richmond
- In office 1904–1908
- Preceded by: Joseph Matheson
- Succeeded by: George William Kyte

Member of the Nova Scotia House of Assembly for Richmond
- In office 1897–1904

Personal details
- Born: September 12, 1867 Grand River, Nova Scotia, Canada
- Died: September 25, 1925 (aged 58) Halifax, Nova Scotia, Canada
- Party: Liberal
- Spouse: Ethel Maude Ballam
- Children: Son: Donald Duncan Finlayson; daughter: Helen Beatrice Finlayson
- Education: Dalhousie University

Duncan Finlayson (September 12, 1867 – September 25, 1925) was a Canadian lawyer, judge, and politician. Born in Grand River, Nova Scotia, the son of Donald and Annabella (Murchison) Finlayson, Finlayson was educated at the Sydney Academy and Dalhousie University where he received a Bachelor of Arts degree in 1893 and a Bachelor of Laws degree in 1895. He was solicitor of the municipality of Richmond, Nova Scotia from 1896 to 1904. He sat in the Nova Scotia House of Assembly from 1897 to 1904. He was very passionate about law and wished to be a lawyer for no other reason than justice.

He was first elected to the House of Commons of Canada for the electoral district of Richmond in the general elections of 1904. A Liberal, he did not stand for re-election. In 1908, he was appointed judge of the County Court, District No. 7 and was appointed surrogate judge in Admiralty for the Island of Cape Breton in 1911.

1904 Canadian federal election: Richmond
Party	Candidate	Votes
Liberal	Duncan Finlayson	1,270
Conservative	Joseph Alexander Gillies	868
Conservative	Henry Nicholas Paint	20
