= Forman Waye =

Canadian politician

William Forman Waye (August 18, 1886 – January 4, 1967), normally referred to simply as Forman Waye, was a merchant, machinist and political figure in Nova Scotia, Canada. He represented Cape Breton County in the Nova Scotia House of Assembly from 1920 to 1925 as an Independent Labour member.

He was born in Sydney Mines, Nova Scotia, the son of William Waye and Mary Ross. Waye married Catherine McDonald. He was whip for the United Farmers-Labour coalition which formed the official opposition in the provincial assembly. Waye was defeated when he ran for reelection in 1925.

His radicalism made it hard for him to get work as a machinist, as he was blacklisted by employers. He sold tombstones and did other odd work, until he was hired in 1938 as a staff worker for the Steel Workers Organizing Committee, on the condition that he leave the Communist Party of Canada and join the Co-operative Commonwealth Federation.

== Sources ==
- A Directory of the Members of the Legislative Assembly of Nova Scotia, 1758-1958, Public Archives of Nova Scotia (1958)
