= Finlay MacDonald (senator) =

Canadian politician

The Honourable Finlay MacDonald OC

Senator for Halifax, Nova Scotia
- In office December 21, 1984 – January 4, 1998
- Appointed by: Brian Mulroney

Personal details
- Born: January 4, 1923 Sydney, Nova Scotia, Canada
- Died: March 2, 2002 (aged 79)
- Party: Progressive Conservative

Finlay MacDonald OC (January 4, 1923 – March 2, 2002) was a Canadian Senator.

MacDonald was born in Sydney, Nova Scotia, the son of Finlay MacDonald (who would serve from 1925 to 1935 as the Member of Parliament for the riding of Cape Breton South) and his wife Olive. He attended St. Francis Xavier University and Dalhousie University. He served with the Canadian Army during World War II. After the war, he joined CJCH and later became president. In 1956, he was elected president of the Canadian Association of Broadcasters. In 1961, he was one of the founding Directors of the CTV Television Network.

He ran unsuccessfully for a seat in the House of Commons of Canada in the riding of Halifax in the 1963 election.

He was president of the Nova Scotia Progressive Conservative Party in the mid-1960s. He was the chief of staff of Robert Stanfield and Joe Clark.

In 1969, he was president and chairman of the first summer Canada Games in Halifax, Nova Scotia. For this role, he was made an Officer of the Order of Canada in 1969.

After being chairman of the Brian Mulroney transition committee in 1983, he was the first appointment made by Mulroney to the Senate in 1984, and served, representing the senatorial division of Halifax, Nova Scotia, until his mandatory retirement in 1998.
