= Donald MacInnis =

Canadian politician

- Official 1973 portrait

Member of Parliament for Cape Breton South*
- In office 10 June 1957 – 18 June 1962
- Preceded by: Clarence Gillis (CCF)
- Succeeded by: Malcolm MacInnis (NDP)

Member of Parliament for Cape Breton South
- In office 7 April 1963 – 25 June 1968
- Preceded by: Malcolm MacInnis
- Succeeded by: Electoral district dissolved

Member of Parliament for Cape Breton—East Richmond
- In office 25 June 1968 – May 1974
- Preceded by: Electoral district established
- Succeeded by: Andy Hogan (NDP)

Mayor for Glace Bay, Nova Scotia
- In office 1988–1995
- Preceded by: Bruce Allan Clark
- Succeeded by: Position dissolved.

Personal details
- Born: 21 August 1918 Glace Bay, Nova Scotia
- Died: 9 May 2007 (aged 88) Glace Bay
- Party: Progressive Conservative
- Profession: Miner
- All federal election dates and info from Parliament of Canada biography

Donald MacInnis (21 August 1918 – 9 May 2007) was a Progressive Conservative party member of the House of Commons of Canada. He was born in Glace Bay, Nova Scotia and became a coal miner by career.

He was first elected at the Cape Breton South riding in the 1957 general election, defeating the long-serving incumbent Co-operative Commonwealth Federation member of parliament Clarence Gillis, also a former miner. MacInnis defeated Gillis again in a rematch almost a year later in the 1958 general election, known as the "Diefenbaker Sweep." MacInnis remained a Member of Parliament throughout the 1960s and early 1970s except for the 25th Parliament when he was defeated in the riding by Malcolm Vic MacInnis of the New Democratic Party in the 1962 election. Since the 1968 election, MacInnis represented Cape Breton—East Richmond, one of the ridings which replaced the Cape Breton South electoral district in a boundary realignment.

After his term in the 29th Parliament ended in 1974, MacInnis left national office and did not campaign for another term.

From 1988, MacInnis served as the final mayor of Glace Bay, a municipality which was dissolved in 1995 and replaced by the Cape Breton Regional Municipality.
