= Robert Hamilton Butts =

Canadian politician

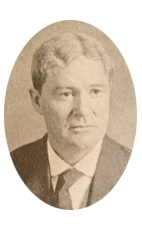

Member of the Canadian Parliament for Cape Breton South and Richmond
- In office 1917–1921
- Preceded by: Riding created in 1914 from Cape Breton South and Richmond
- Succeeded by: William F. Carroll

Personal details
- Born: August 4, 1871 Port Morien, Nova Scotia, Canada
- Died: November 29, 1943 (aged 72)
- Party: Unionist Party
- Occupation: barrister, lawyer

Robert Hamilton Butts (August 4, 1871, in Port Morien, Nova Scotia, Canada – November 29, 1943) was a politician, barrister and lawyer. He was elected to the House of Commons of Canada as a member of the Unionist Party in the 1917 election to represent the riding of Cape Breton South and Richmond. He was defeated in the 1923 by-election for the riding of North Cape Breton and Victoria. Butts was also a Member of the Nova Scotia House of Assembly (1911–1917 and 1928–1933) representing the electoral district of Cape Breton County in two terms as a member of the Nova Scotia Conservative Party. He also served in the Legislative Council of Nova Scotia (1927–1928).
