= Cape Breton South =

Cape Breton South may refer to either of two ridings in Nova Scotia, Canada:

- Cape Breton South (federal electoral district), a federal electoral district represented in the House of Commons of Canada from 1904 to 1911 and from 1925 to 1968
- Cape Breton South (provincial electoral district), a provincial electoral district from 1933 to 2013
