= Finlay MacDonald (MP) =

Canadian politician

Member of Parliament for Cape Breton South
- In office October 1925 – October 1935
- Preceded by: William F. Carroll
- Succeeded by: David James Hartigan

Personal details
- Born: 17 November 1866 Port Hawkesbury, Nova Scotia
- Died: 29 May 1948 (aged 81) Sydney, Nova Scotia
- Party: Conservative
- Spouse(s): Olive E. Guthrie m. 17 August 1919
- Profession: Barrister

Finlay MacDonald (17 November 1866 – 29 May 1948) was a Conservative member of the House of Commons of Canada. He was born in Port Hawkesbury, Nova Scotia and became a barrister.

The son of Malcolm MacDonald and Sarah Cantwell, MacDonald attended St. Francis Xavier College then Dalhousie University in Nova Scotia, earning a Bachelor of Laws degree. From 1906 to 1925 he was a city solicitor for Sydney, Nova Scotia. He was also appointed a King's Counsel.

He was first elected to Parliament at the Cape Breton South riding in the 1925 general election then re-elected there in 1926 and 1930. MacDonald was defeated in the 1935 federal election by David James Hartigan of the Liberals.

He died in 1948 at Sydney.

His son, also named Finlay MacDonald, a Halifax broadcasting executive, would run unsuccessfully for the House of Commons in the riding of Halifax in the 1963 federal election, and would eventually be appointed to the Canadian Senate by then-Prime Minister Brian Mulroney in 1984.
