= Edmund Power Flynn =

Canadian politician (1828–1900)

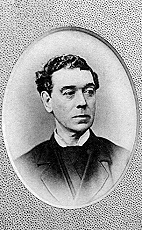
- Flynn in 1879

Member of Parliament for Richmond
- In office 1874–1882
- Preceded by: Isaac LeVesconte
- Succeeded by: Henry Nicholas Paint
- In office 1887–1891
- Preceded by: Henry Nicholas Paint
- Succeeded by: Joseph A. Gillies

Personal details
- Born: August 19, 1828 Arichat, Nova Scotia
- Died: January 26, 1900 (aged 71) Arichat, Nova Scotia, Canada
- Party: Liberal Party of Canada
- Spouse(s): Mary Ann Barry, Ellen Phelan
- Children: (By first marriage) John, David, Mary Elizabeth (by second marriage) Margaret Helene, Evelyn, Edmund Power, Ellen Josephine, William Garvie, Albert James, Edgar Francis, Eva Gertrude, Charles Peter
- Occupation: coroner, merchant

Edmund Power Flynn (born August 19, 1828 – January 26, 1900) was a Canadian politician, Richmond County's first coroner and merchant. He was the son of John Flynn (1789–1839) and Mary Power (1794–1849) both born in Dungarvan, Co. Waterford, Ireland. He was elected to the House of Commons of Canada in 1874 as a Member of the Liberal Party for Richmond. He was re-elected in 1878 and 1887. He was defeated in the elections of 1882 and 1891.

== Biography ==
Born August 19, 1928, in Arichat, Nova Scotia, he was educated in Cape Breton and became a merchant in Arichat. In 1852, Flynn married Mary Ann Barry (died 1862) he then married Ellen Phelan in 1865. He was coroner for Richmond County from 1863 to 1900.

Prior to his federal political experience, he was elected to the Legislative Assembly of Nova Scotia as a Member of the Nova Scotia Liberal Party for Richmond, serving from 1867 to 1874. During his time in the Nova Scotia legislature, he was a Minister without portfolio in the Executive Council of Nova Scotia. He was made Commissioner of Crown Lands in 1871 and served until he resigned from the provincial assembly in 1874 to contest the federal seat.

Flynn was customs collector at Arichat from 1897 until his death there on January 26, 1900, aged 71.

== Electoral record ==
1874 Canadian federal election: Richmond
Party	Candidate	Votes
Liberal	Edmund Power Flynn	564
Unknown	Renée Benoit	486
Source: lop.parl.ca

1878 Canadian federal election: Richmond
Party	Candidate	Votes
Liberal	Edmund Power Flynn	666
Unknown	Renée Benoit	552

1882 Canadian federal election: Richmond
Party	Candidate	Votes
Conservative	Henry Nicholas Paint	525
Liberal	Edmund Power Flynn	461

1887 Canadian federal election: Richmond
Party	Candidate	Votes
Liberal	Edmund Power Flynn	910
Conservative	Henry Nicholas Paint	609
Independent Conservative	S.P. Leblanc	317

1891 Canadian federal election: Richmond
Party	Candidate	Votes
Conservative	Joseph Alexander Gillies	857
Conservative	Henry Nicholas Paint	755
Liberal	Edmund Power Flynn	670
