= James Maddin =

James Maddin may refer to:

- Jim Maddin, Canadian politician
- James William Maddin (1874–1961), Canadian lawyer and political figure in Nova Scotia
