= Joseph Alexander Gillies =

Canadian politician

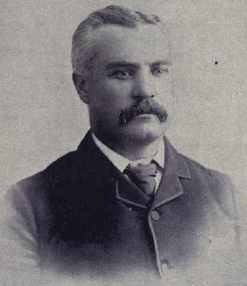

Member of the Canadian Parliament for Richmond
- In office 1891–1900
- Preceded by: Edmund Power Flynn
- Succeeded by: Joseph Matheson

Personal details
- Born: September 17, 1849 Irish Cove, Nova Scotia
- Died: July 7, 1921 (aged 71)
- Party: Conservative

Joseph Alexander Gillies (September 17, 1849 – July 7, 1921) was a Canadian politician.

Born in Irish Cove, Nova Scotia, the son of John Gillies and Mary McLean, Gillies was educated at St. Francis Xavier University graduating in April 1871. He was called to the Nova Scotia bar in 1875 and practised law in Sydney. He was the registrar of probate for the County of Cape Breton, Nova Scotia from August 1872 until he resigned when he ran unsuccessfully for the riding of Cape Breton in the 1887 federal election. He was clerk of the Peace for Cape Breton county from December 1875 until January 1880 when the county was incorporated, and then he was appointed Municipal clerk, which he held until January 1883 when he became solicitor of the municipality (Sydney).

In 1883, he married Josephine Eulalie Bertrand. Gillies was named Queen's Counsel in 1895. In 1901, he purchased the Sydney Post.

He was elected to the House of Commons of Canada for the riding of Richmond in the 1891 election but unseated upon petition and at the by-election held in January 1892 was re-elected. A Conservative, he was re-elected in 1896. He was defeated in 1900 and again in 1904 and 1911.

Gillies died in Sydney at the age of 71.

== Electoral record ==
1891 Canadian federal election: Richmond
Party	Candidate	Votes
Conservative	Joseph Alexander Gillies	857
Conservative	Henry Nicholas Paint	755
Liberal	Edmund Power Flynn	670

By-election on 21 January 1892 On Mr. Gillies being unseated, 21 December 1891
Party	Candidate	Votes
Conservative	Joseph Alexander Gillies	acclaimed

1896 Canadian federal election: Richmond
Party	Candidate	Votes
Conservative	Joseph Alexander Gillies	1,078
Liberal	Edm. V. Flynn	1,056

1900 Canadian federal election: Richmond
Party	Candidate	Votes
Liberal	Joseph Matheson	1,092
Conservative	Joseph Alexander Gillies	840

1904 Canadian federal election: Richmond
Party	Candidate	Votes
Liberal	Duncan Finlayson	1,270
Conservative	Joseph Alexander Gillies	868
Conservative	Henry Nicholas Paint	20

1911 Canadian federal election: Richmond
Party	Candidate	Votes
Liberal	George William Kyte	1,268
Conservative	Joseph Alexander Gillies	983
