= Andrew Hogan =

Canadian politician (1923–2002)

Member of the Canadian Parliament for Cape Breton—East Richmond
- In office July 8, 1974 – February 18, 1980
- Preceded by: Donald MacInnis (Progressive Conservative)
- Succeeded by: David Dingwall (Liberal)

Personal details
- Born: October 28, 1923 Glace Bay, Nova Scotia
- Died: April 10, 2002 (aged 78) Cole Harbour, Nova Scotia
- Party: New Democratic Party
- Occupation: Roman Catholic priest

Andrew (Andy) Hogan (October 28, 1923 – April 10, 2002) was a Canadian politician and priest. He was the first Roman Catholic priest to be elected to the House of Commons of Canada. He was known more commonly by his informal name: Father Andy.

== Biography ==
Born in Glace Bay, Nova Scotia, Rev. Hogan received a bachelor's degree from St. Francis Xavier University (St. F.X.), where he became involved in the co-operative movement. St. F.X. was the home of the Antigonish Movement, started by Father Jimmy Tompkins and Rev. Dr. Moses Coady, that put the Rochdale Principles of Co-operation into action in the Maritimes by starting building co-ops, credit unions, co-op farms, etc. Being in the heartland of the co-op movement deeply affected his political views, which eventually led him to the New Democratic Party.

He studied theology at Holy Heart Seminary and was ordained as a Roman Catholic priest in 1949.

As a member of the New Democratic Party, he was elected to the House of Commons from Cape Breton—East Richmond in the 1974 federal election. He was re-elected in 1979. Hogan was defeated in the 1980 federal election, losing to David Dingwall by 294 votes. After the defeat, he never ran for public office again.

In 2002, Hogan died in Cole Harbour, Nova Scotia after a long illness.
