= Cape Breton—East Richmond =

Former federal electoral district in Nova Scotia, Canada

Nova Scotia electoral district

Defunct federal electoral district
- Legislature: House of Commons
- District created: 1966
- District abolished: 1996
- First contested: 1968
- Last contested: 1993

Cape Breton—East Richmond was a federal electoral district in Nova Scotia, Canada, that was represented in the House of Commons of Canada from 1968 to 1997.

This riding was created in 1966 from Cape Breton South, Inverness—Richmond and North Cape Breton and Victoria ridings. It consisted initially of parts the Counties of Cape Breton and Richmond. It was abolished in 1996 when it was redistributed into Bras d'Or and Sydney—Victoria.

== Members of Parliament ==
This riding elected the following members of Parliament:

Parliament	Years	Member	Party
Cape Breton—East Richmond; Riding created from Cape Breton South, Inverness—Richmond and North Cape Breton and Victoria
28th	1968–1972	Donald MacInnis	Progressive Conservative
29th	1972–1974	Donald MacInnis	Progressive Conservative
30th	1974–1979	Andrew Hogan	New Democratic
31st	1979–1980	Andrew Hogan	New Democratic
32nd	1980–1984	David Dingwall	Liberal
33rd	1984–1988	David Dingwall	Liberal
34th	1988–1993	David Dingwall	Liberal
35th	1993–1997	David Dingwall	Liberal
Riding dissolved into Bras d'Or and Sydney—Victoria

== Election results ==
1968 Canadian federal election
Party	Candidate	Votes
Progressive Conservative	Donald MacInnis	11,583
Liberal	Leo McIntyre	8,284
New Democratic	Jeremy Akerman	7,749

1972 Canadian federal election
Party	Candidate	Votes
Progressive Conservative	Donald MacInnis	12,071
New Democratic	John Jake Currie	10,064
Liberal	William M. Roach	9,066

1974 Canadian federal election
Party	Candidate	Votes
New Democratic	Andrew Hogan	14,210
Liberal	George Wilson	9,746
Progressive Conservative	James MacDougall	7,847

1979 Canadian federal election
Party	Candidate	Votes
New Democratic	Andrew Hogan	15,269
Liberal	Dan A. Munroe	10,257
Progressive Conservative	Bob Crosby	7,411
Independent	Jake Campbell	734

1980 Canadian federal election
Party	Candidate	Votes
Liberal	David Dingwall	12,478
New Democratic	Andrew Hogan	12,184
Progressive Conservative	Bob Crosby	7,115

1984 Canadian federal election
Party	Candidate	Votes
Liberal	David Dingwall	20,270
Progressive Conservative	Bill Marsh	11,896
New Democratic	Douglass L. Grant	3,709
Rhinoceros	Connie MacIntyre	444

1988 Canadian federal election
Party	Candidate	Votes
Liberal	David Dingwall	22,786
Progressive Conservative	Michael L. MacDonald	7,173
New Democratic	John Stevens	4,482

1993 Canadian federal election
Party	Candidate	Votes
Liberal	David Dingwall	24,997
Progressive Conservative	Sam Boutilier	2,756
New Democratic	Joanne Lamey	1,769
Reform	Harry Pollett	1,751
National	Billy Kennedy	463
Natural Law	Patrick Gilbert	169

== See also ==
- List of Canadian electoral districts
- Historical federal electoral districts of Canada
