= Alexander Johnston (Canadian politician) =

Canadian politician

Alexander Johnston CMG
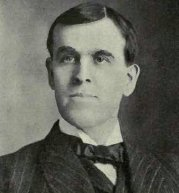

Member of the Canadian Parliament for Cape Breton
- In office 1900–1904
- Preceded by: Charles Tupper
- Succeeded by: District was abolished in 1903

Member of the Canadian Parliament for Cape Breton South
- In office 1904–1908
- Preceded by: District was created in 1903
- Succeeded by: James William Maddin

Member of the Nova Scotia House of Assembly for Cape Breton
- In office 1897–1900

Personal details
- Born: April 24, 1867 Richmond County, Nova Scotia, Canada
- Died: November 30, 1951 (aged 84) Ottawa, Ontario, Canada
- Party: Liberal

Alexander Johnston, CMG (April 24, 1867 – November 30, 1951) was a Canadian journalist, civil servant and politician.

Born in Richmond County, Nova Scotia, Johnston was educated at the Common Schools and St. Francis Xavier College, Antigonish, Nova Scotia. He was the editor and proprietor of the Sydney Daily Record. He was elected, in 1897, to the Nova Scotia House of Assembly but he resigned his seat in 1900 in order to contest the riding of Cape Breton for the House of Commons of Canada. A Liberal, he was successful and was re-elected in 1904. He was defeated in 1908. Johnston was Deputy Minister of Marine and Fisheries from 1910 to 1933. He led the Canadian delegation to London which participated in the development of international regulations for safety at sea following the sinking of RMS Titanic. Johnston was made a Companion of the Order of St Michael and St George in 1935. He died in Ottawa at the age of 84.

1900 Canadian federal election: Cape Breton
Party	Candidate	Votes	%	Elected
Liberal	Alexander Johnston	3,922	25.99	✓
Liberal	Arthur Samuel Kendall	3,890	25.78	✓
Conservative	Charles Tupper	3,672	24.34	
Liberal–Conservative	Hector Francis McDougall	3,604	23.89	
Total valid votes		15,088	–	
Source: Library of Parliament
