= Joseph McPherson =

Canadian politician from Nova Scotia (1844-1930

Member of the Nova Scotia House of Assembly for Cape Breton County
- In office May 21, 1890 – March 14, 1894

Personal details
- Born: June 10, 1844 Big Pond, Nova Scotia
- Died: September 13, 1930 (aged 86) North Sydney, Nova Scotia
- Party: Liberal
- Occupation: merchant, politician

Joseph McPherson (June 16, 1844 – March 3, 1930) was a merchant and political figure in Nova Scotia, Canada. He represented Cape Breton County in the Nova Scotia House of Assembly from 1890 to 1894 as a Liberal member. McPherson died in 1930 in North Sydney, Nova Scotia. He was elected in the 1890 Nova Scotia general election and a by-election in 1891, but was unsuccessful in the 1894 Nova Scotia general election. McPherson was also a Liberal candidate in the 1891 and 1896 Canadian federal election in Cape Breton.
