= Robert Weir (politician) =

Canadian politician

The Honourable Robert Weir PC MC
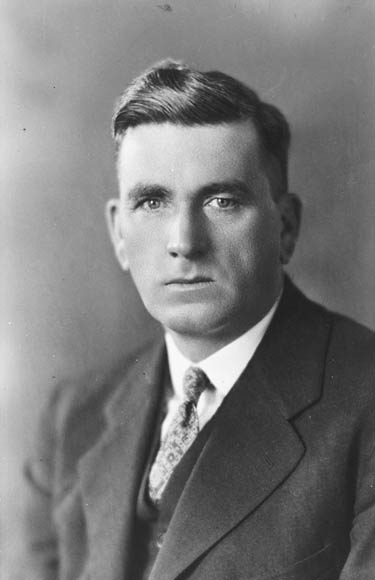
- Weir, c. 1930’s

Minister of Agriculture
- In office 8 August 1930 – 22 October 1935
- Prime Minister: R. B. Bennett
- Preceded by: William Richard Motherwell
- Succeeded by: Thomas Crerar

Member of Parliament for Melfort
- In office 28 July 1930 – 13 October 1935
- Preceded by: Malcolm McLean
- Succeeded by: Malcolm McLean

Personal details
- Born: 5 December 1882 Wingham, Ontario, Canada
- Died: 7 March 1939 (aged 56) Weldon, Saskatchewan, Canada
- Party: Conservative
- Spouse: Dorothy Vance (m. 1922)
- Children: 2
- Education: University of Toronto
- Profession: Farmer; teacher

Military service
- Allegiance: Canada
- Branch/service: Canadian Expeditionary Force
- Years of service: 1915-1919
- Rank: Major
- Battles/wars: World War I

Robert Weir PC MC (5 December 1882 – 7 March 1939) was a Canadian politician.

Weir was born in Wingham, Ontario, and was a teacher by training. After working in Ontario he moved to Regina, Saskatchewan, where he taught, worked as an actuary, public school inspector, farmer and horse, cattle and hog breeder. He fought in World War I and was wounded at the Third Battle of Ypres.

He was elected to the House of Commons of Canada in the 1930 federal election becoming the Conservative MP for Melfort, Saskatchewan.

He was appointed to the Cabinet as Minister of Agriculture under Richard Bennett at a time when farmers were faced with the drought known as the "Dust Bowl" as well as the general crisis of the Great Depression which caused wheat prices to collapse from $1.28 to 60 cents a bushel within three years.

Under Weir's tenure, agricultural researchers attempted to teach farmers how to prevent soil drifting that caused the Dust Bowl and initiated a major grasshopper control campaign in 1933 that reduced crop losses.

The National Products Marketing Act, which attempted to establish a national marketing board was declared unconstitutional in 1934 for exceeding the federal government's jurisdiction.

Weir's Prairie Farm Rehabilitation Administration Act passed in April 1935. The law provided money to farmers to encourage them to improve their farming practices, conserve water supplies and adopt new land-use practices. He also reformed and expanded scientific research by the Department of Agriculture in conjunction with the National Research Council.
