= Richmond (Nova Scotia federal electoral district) =

Former federal electoral district in Nova Scotia, Canada

Nova Scotia electoral district

Defunct federal electoral district
- Legislature: House of Commons
- District created: 1867
- District abolished: 1914
- First contested: 1867
- Last contested: 1911

Demographics
- Census division(s): Richmond

Richmond was a federal electoral district in the province of Nova Scotia, Canada, that was represented in the House of Commons of Canada from 1867 to 1917. It was created by the British North America Act, 1867. It consisted of the County of Richmond. A law to abolish the riding was passed to merge it with Cape Breton South into Cape Breton South and Richmond in 1914. This was duly carried out when the first elections were held with new boundaries and the new name in 1917.

== Members of Parliament ==
This riding elected the following members of Parliament:

Parliament	Years	Member	Party
Richmond
1st	1867–1869	William Joseph Croke	Anti-Confederation
1st	1869–1872	Isaac LeVesconte	Conservative
2nd	1872–1874	Isaac LeVesconte	Conservative
3rd	1874–1878	Edmund Power Flynn	Liberal
4th	1878–1882	Edmund Power Flynn	Liberal
5th	1882–1887	Henry Nicholas Paint	Conservative
6th	1887–1891	Edmund Power Flynn	Liberal
7th	1891–1891	Joseph Alexander Gillies	Conservative
7th	1892–1896	Joseph Alexander Gillies	Conservative
8th	1896–1900	Joseph Alexander Gillies	Conservative
9th	1900–1904	Joseph Matheson	Liberal
10th	1904–1908	Duncan Finlayson	Liberal
11th	1908–1911	George William Kyte	Liberal
12th	1911–1917	George William Kyte	Liberal
Riding dissolved into Cape Breton South and Richmond

== Election results ==
1867 Canadian federal election
Party	Candidate	Votes
Anti-Confederation	William Joseph Croke	545
Unknown	Mr. Donovan	279

By-election on 20 April 1869 On Mr. Croke's death, 11 March 1869
Party	Candidate	Votes
Conservative	Isaac Le Vesconte	560
Unknown	W.A. Henry	333

1872 Canadian federal election
Party	Candidate	Votes
Conservative	Isaac LeVesconte	571
Unknown	Mr. Kavanagh	300
Source: Canadian Elections Database

1874 Canadian federal election
Party	Candidate	Votes
Liberal	Edmund Power Flynn	564
Unknown	Renée Benoit	486
Source: lop.parl.ca

1878 Canadian federal election
Party	Candidate	Votes
Liberal	Edmund Power Flynn	666
Unknown	Renée Benoit	552

1882 Canadian federal election
Party	Candidate	Votes
Conservative	Henry Nicholas Paint	525
Liberal	Edmund Power Flynn	461

1887 Canadian federal election
Party	Candidate	Votes
Liberal	Edmund Power Flynn	910
Conservative	Henry Nicholas Paint	609
Independent Conservative	S.P. Leblanc	317

1891 Canadian federal election
Party	Candidate	Votes
Conservative	Joseph Alexander Gillies	857
Conservative	Henry Nicholas Paint	755
Liberal	Edmund Power Flynn	670

By-election on 21 January 1892 On Mr. Gillies being unseated, 21 December 1891
Party	Candidate	Votes
Conservative	Joseph Alexander Gillies	acclaimed

1896 Canadian federal election
Party	Candidate	Votes
Conservative	Joseph Alexander Gillies	1,078
Liberal	Edm. V. Flynn	1,056

1900 Canadian federal election
Party	Candidate	Votes
Liberal	Joseph Matheson	1,092
Conservative	Joseph Alexander Gillies	840

1904 Canadian federal election
Party	Candidate	Votes
Liberal	Duncan Finlayson	1,270
Conservative	Joseph Alexander Gillies	868
Conservative	Henry Nicholas Paint	20

1908 Canadian federal election
Party	Candidate	Votes
Liberal	George William Kyte	1,279
Conservative	Roderick Ferguson	1,039

1911 Canadian federal election
Party	Candidate	Votes
Liberal	George William Kyte	1,268
Conservative	Joseph Alexander Gillies	983

== See also ==
- List of Canadian electoral districts
- Historical federal electoral districts of Canada
