= Isaac LeVesconte =

Canadian politician

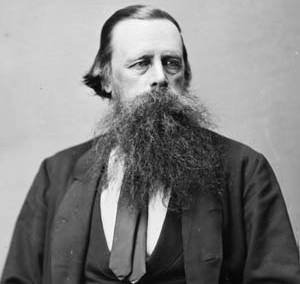
Isaac LeVesconte Source: Library and Archives Canada

Isaac LeVesconte (August 12, 1822 – October 26, 1879) was a Nova Scotia businessman and political figure. He represented Richmond in the House of Commons of Canada as a Conservative member from 1869 to 1874.

He was born at Saint Aubin in Jersey in 1822, was educated at Saint Helier, Jersey, and came to Arichat on Isle Madame at the age of 12. LeVesconte worked in his family's company which sold goods to fisherman and imported and exported goods, including dried fish. He was put in charge of the operation at Arichat in 1855. LeVesconte was elected to the Nova Scotia House of Assembly in 1863 for Richmond County and served as financial secretary from 1863 to 1864. He was elected to the House of Commons for the 1st Canadian Parliament in an 1869 by-election after the death of William Croke.

LeVesconte retired from politics in 1874 and died in Arichat in 1879.

His grandson, Isaac Duncan MacDougall, later served in the House of Commons.

== Electoral record ==
By-election on 20 April 1869 On Mr. Croke's death, 11 March 1869
Party	Candidate	Votes
Conservative	Isaac LeVesconte	560
Unknown	W.A. Henry	333

1872 Canadian federal election: Richmond
Party	Candidate	Votes
Conservative	Isaac LeVesconte	571
Unknown	Mr. Kavanagh	300
Source: Canadian Elections Database
