= William Buchanan (Nova Scotia politician) =

Canadian politician from Nova Scotia

Member of the Nova Scotia House of Assembly for Cape Breton County
- In office June 20, 1882 – June 14, 1886

Personal details
- Party: Liberal
- Occupation: merchant, politician

William Buchanan (unknown – unknown) was a merchant and political figure in Nova Scotia, Canada. He represented Cape Breton County in the Nova Scotia House of Assembly from 1882 to 1886 as a Liberal member. He was elected in the 1882 Nova Scotia general election and did not contest any subsequent elections.
