= Mouseland =

Canadian political fable

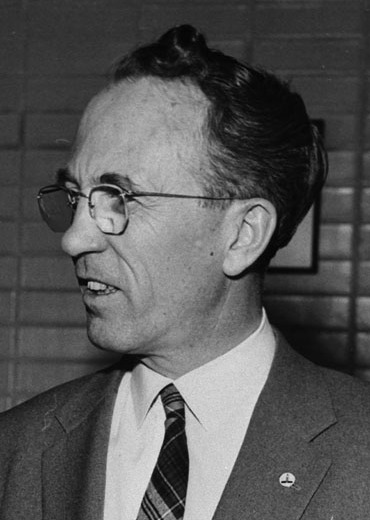
Tommy Douglas in 1955

Mouseland is a political fable first told by Clarence Gillis in 1944, and later and most famously by Tommy Douglas, leader of the Saskatchewan Co-operative Commonwealth Federation (CCF) that became the New Democratic Party of Canada, both social democratic parties. The story is about a nation of mice voting for either black cats or white cats to run their country, and expresses the CCF's view that the Canadian political system was flawed in offering voters a false dichotomy: the choice of two parties, neither of which represented their interests.

== Synopsis ==
The mice voted in black cats, which represented the Progressive Conservative Party, and then they found out how hard life was. Then they voted in the white cats, which symbolized the Liberal Party and things were different, but still not good for mice, because the government was still run by cats; subsequently they alternated the two, then they tried a coalition, and ultimately spotted cats were voted in which sought to sound like mice. A mouse got an idea that mice should run their government, not the cats, was accused of being a Bolshevik, and was imprisoned. The concluding point was that one can lock up a mouse or a person, but one cannot lock up an idea.

== Variations ==
A variation of this story is told in Douglas Adams' novel So Long, and Thanks for All the Fish, involving a democracy where people vote for lizards as their leaders. No one is happy with this situation, except for the lizards, but the people continue voting for the lizards "because if they didn't vote for a lizard ... the wrong lizard might get in".

In 2006, Brad Wall, Leader of the Saskatchewan Party, the opposition party in Saskatchewan, parodied Mouseland, a place in which the mice govern as destructive creatures, as an attack on the Saskatchewan New Democratic Party. In 2010, Wall carried his parody further by giving "A Mouseland Update" to the Saskatchewan Party's Annual Convention.

== See also ==
- Lesser of two evils principle
- Marketplace of ideas
