= David James Hartigan =

Canadian politician

Member of Parliament for Cape Breton South
- In office October 1935 – March 1940
- Preceded by: Finlay MacDonald
- Succeeded by: Clarence Gillis

Personal details
- Born: David James Hartigan; 8 November 1887 Sydney Mines, Nova Scotia, Canada
- Died: 16 January 1952 (aged 64) New Waterford, Nova Scotia, Canada
- Party: Liberal
- Spouse(s): Caroline Phalen m. 25 November 1925
- Profession: physician

David James Hartigan (8 November 1887 – 16 January 1952) was a Liberal party member of the House of Commons of Canada. He was born in Sydney Mines, Nova Scotia and became a physician.

Hartigan attended parochial school at North Sydney and high school at Sydney Mines. In 1916, he made an unsuccessful bid for a seat in the Nova Scotia House of Assembly.

He was first elected to Parliament at the Cape Breton South riding in the 1935 general election. After serving one term, the 18th Canadian Parliament, he was defeated by Clarence Gillis of the Co-operative Commonwealth Federation (CCF) in the 1940 election. Hartigan was unsuccessful at unseating Gillis in the 1945 election. He died in 1952.
