= Cape Breton South and Richmond =

Former federal electoral district in Nova Scotia, Canada

Nova Scotia electoral district

Defunct federal electoral district
- Legislature: House of Commons
- District created: 1914
- District abolished: 1924
- First contested: 1917
- Last contested: 1921

Cape Breton South and Richmond was a federal electoral district in the province of Nova Scotia, Canada, that was represented in the House of Commons of Canada from 1917 to 1925. This riding was created in 1917 by a statute passed in 1914 from Cape Breton South and Richmond ridings. It consisted of the electoral district of South Cape Breton and the county of Richmond. It was abolished with a law passed in 1924 and carried out in 1925, when it was redistributed into Cape Breton South and Richmond—West Cape Breton. The riding was a dual-member constituency—it elected two members to Parliament.

== Members of Parliament ==
This riding elected the following members of Parliament:

Parliament	Years	Member	Party	Member	Party
Cape Breton South and Richmond; Riding created from Cape Breton South and Richmond
13th	1917–1921	John Carey Douglas	Government (Unionist)	Robert Hamilton Butts	Government (Unionist)
14th	1921–1925	William F. Carroll	Liberal	George William Kyte	Liberal
Riding dissolved into Cape Breton South and Richmond—West Cape Breton

== Election results ==
1917 Canadian federal election
Party	Candidate	Votes	%	Elected
Government (Unionist)	John Carey Douglas	8,073		✓
Government (Unionist)	Robert Hamilton Butts	7,645		✓
Opposition (Laurier Liberals)	George William Kyte	6,738		
Opposition (Laurier Liberals)	William F. Carroll	6,690		
Labour	Robert Baxter	3,667		
Labour	John Angus Gillies	3,615		
Source:History of the Federal Electoral Ridings, 1867—1980

1921 Canadian federal election
Party	Candidate	Votes	%	Elected
Liberal	William F. Carroll	10,524		✓
Liberal	George William Kyte	10,387		✓
Progressive	James Bryson McLachlan	8,914		
Progressive	Edward Charles Doyle	7,884		
Conservative	John Carey Douglas	7,694		
Conservative	Robert S. McLellan	6,075		
Source:History of the Federal Electoral Ridings, 1867—1980

== See also ==
- List of Canadian electoral districts
- Historical federal electoral districts of Canada
