= Henry Nicholas Paint =

Canadian politician

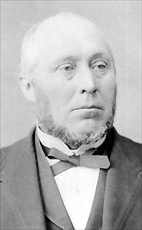

Member of the Canadian Parliament for Richmond
- In office 1882–1887
- Preceded by: Edmund Power Flynn
- Succeeded by: Edmund Power Flynn

Personal details
- Born: 10 April 1830 Belle Vue, Strait of Canso, Nova Scotia
- Died: 29 September 1921 (aged 91) Artillery Place, Halifax, Nova Scotia, Canada
- Party: Conservative
- Spouse(s): Christina St Clair McVean (first wife); Ella Cowdray (second wife)
- Children: include (by first marriage) Flora St Clair, Mary Le Mesurier; and (by second marriage) Mander Paint
- Education: Wolfville Academy
- Occupation: Politician, shipowner, merchant, property owner
- Henry Nicholas Paint – Parliament of Canada biography

Henry Nicholas Paint (10 April 1830 – 29 September 1921) was a Canadian politician, shipowner and merchant.

== Career ==
Henry Paint was the son of Nicholas Paint, JP, by Mary Le Messurier, both of old Guernsey families which had been trading with Nova Scotia since at least the mid-18th century; a 'Paint Island', off Canso, is recorded in 1750. In 1817 his father, a merchant shipowner and agent at Arichat, Nova Scotia, petitioned for land grants at Belle Vue on the Strait of Canso, where he built a stone house and settled by 1822. Henry was educated in Guernsey and at the Wolfville Academy (today Acadia University), and served 1853-69 as a lieutenant-captain in the Canadian Militia during the Fenian raids.

He spent his early life as an insurance and commission agent in the City of Halifax. He was elected to the House of Commons of Canada in 1882 as a Member of the Conservative Party for Richmond, Nova Scotia. In Parliament, he was a strong supporter of Sir John A. Macdonald, the first prime minister of Canada. He promoted a large number of public and infrastructure works for Cape Breton, including the first marine railway, the first steamers from Boston, numerous wharves and warehouses, as well as post offices and lighthouses, and the bridge and railroad to Arichat, and he was instrumental in negotiating favourable trading terms for the Dominion with Norway and the West Indies. He contested the three general elections of 1887, 1891 and 1904, but despite his successes for the community, he was defeated on each occasion.

Henry was a progressive merchant and community leader. He accumulated extensive property holdings on Cape Breton Island. Apart from the family estate of 130 acres (0.53 km^{2}) at Canso, in 1863 he acquired commercial property at Point Tupper, Nova Scotia, a few miles from Port Hawkesbury, on a site 'exceedingly well situated for trade' at the main entry point between mainland Nova Scotia and Cape Breton Island. Here he constructed wharves and laid out a new township, selling plots doggedly to the end of his life; today he is commemorated there by 'Henry Paint Street'. His other holdings included the 'Paint seam' of coal mines which he opened up at Sydney in Victoria County, Nova Scotia, as well as gypsum options at Brierley Brook in Antigonish County.

Henry Paint has a street, Paint Street, named after him in Port Hawkesbury, Nova Scotia.

Henry Paint's long life is exceptionally well documented for the period, largely from letters written in his old age to his grandchildren, a selection of which were published in 2005. He died at his house at 3 Artillery Place, Halifax, aged 91.

His younger daughter, Mary Le Mesurier, married Sir Charles Tertius Mander, first baronet, of the Mander family, industrialists and philanthropists dominant in the English Midlands. His elder daughter, Flora St Clair, married Sir Charles's first cousin, Theodore Mander, builder of Wightwick Manor, one of the most notable Arts and Crafts movement houses in England, owned since 1937 by the National Trust.

== Electoral record ==
1882 Canadian federal election: Richmond
Party	Candidate	Votes
Conservative	Henry Nicholas Paint	525
Liberal	Edmund Power Flynn	461

1887 Canadian federal election: Richmond
Party	Candidate	Votes
Liberal	Edmund Power Flynn	910
Conservative	Henry Nicholas Paint	609
Independent Conservative	S.P. Leblanc	317

1891 Canadian federal election: Richmond
Party	Candidate	Votes
Conservative	Joseph Alexander Gillies	857
Conservative	Henry Nicholas Paint	755
Liberal	Edmund Power Flynn	670

== Sources ==
- Nicholas Mander, Varnished leaves : a biography of the Mander family of Wolverhampton, 1750-1950. Dursley: Owlpen Press. 2004. ISBN 0-9546056-0-8.
- J. L. MacDougall, History of Inverness County, Nova Scotia, April 1923, chap. XI, which gives an account of the Paint family in Nova Scotia
- A Cyclopaedia of Canadian Biography, ed. Geo. Maclean Rose, Toronto: Rose Publishing, 1886, p. 442
