= David Dingwall =

Canadian politician

The Honourable David Dingwall PC

President of Cape Breton University
- Incumbent
- Assumed office April 6, 2018
- Preceded by: David Wheeler

Member of the Canadian Parliament for Cape Breton—East Richmond
- In office February 18, 1980 – June 2, 1997
- Preceded by: Andrew Hogan
- Succeeded by: Riding dissolved

Personal details
- Born: 29 June 1952 (age 73) Sydney, Nova Scotia
- Party: Liberal
- Profession: Lawyer, politician

David Charles Dingwall PC (born June 29, 1952) is a Canadian administrator, former Canadian Cabinet minister and civil servant. He is the president of Cape Breton University.

== Political career ==
A lawyer by training, Dingwall was first elected to the House of Commons of Canada in the 1980 Canadian federal election as the Liberal Member of Parliament (MP) for Cape Breton—East Richmond in Nova Scotia. He was re-elected in three subsequent elections, and served as Opposition House Leader from 1991 to 1993.

=== In Cabinet ===
After the Liberals won the 1993 Canadian election under Jean Chrétien, Dingwall was appointed to Cabinet as the Minister of Public Works and Minister of Supply and Services, Minister responsible for Canada Post, Minister responsible for Canada Mortgage and Housing, Minister responsible for the Royal Canadian Mint, Minister responsible for Defence Construction Limited, and the Minister responsible for the Atlantic Canada Opportunities Agency. Dingwall also served on several cabinet committees, including the Treasury Board and Economic Development. In 1996, Dingwall convinced the then prime minister of Canada to host the G7 Summit in Halifax, Nova Scotia. Leaders from the G7 convened in Halifax and Boris Yeltsin, the president of Russia was a special attendee at that session. In 1996, Dingwall was appointed Minister of Health. In 1997, Dingwall passed the Tobacco Control Act, which at the time was the toughest tobacco legislation in the world. He was subsequently honoured by the Canadian Cancer Society and the World Health Organization.

=== 1997 election ===
Dingwall ran for re-election in 1997 in the newly created riding of Bras d'Or, losing by over 1,000 votes to Michelle Dockrill of the NDP.

== After politics ==
Following his defeat in 1997, Dingwall was given an honorary Doctorate of Laws from the University College of Cape Breton, recipient of the Connaught Award presented by the Canadian Lung Association. Dingwall served as president of Wallding International, a government relations firm and served on several corporate board of directors, including, Rogers Sugar Income Fund, MD Life, advisory board, State Street Global Advisors Inc., director of Webstandard Inc., and director of Journeys End Car Rental Limited.

== Royal Canadian Mint ==
On February 27, 2003, the Government of Canada appointed Dingwall to the position of president and chief executive officer of the Royal Canadian Mint. His leadership led that organization to increase profitability and posting its first surplus in several years.

In the fall of 2005, Dingwall came under scrutiny for having allegedly made excessive expense claims while he was president of the Royal Canadian Mint. In the midst of these allegations, Dingwall resigned from the Mint on September 28, 2005. When questioned while giving testimony before Parliament as to why he felt he should receive a severance package after the voluntary resignation, he remarked "I'm entitled to my entitlements." The statement would be used by the Conservatives in a television advertisement during the 2006 federal election that featured that part of Dingwall's testimony.

On leaving the Royal Canadian Mint, Dingwall called for an independent audit which was completed by PricewaterhouseCoopers who found "the expenses fell within the guidelines". A second independent review by the law firm of Osler, Hoskin and Harcourt found that the Mint's process for monitoring expenses were stricter than those of most private corporations. On or about February 4, 2006, retired Superior Court Justice George Adams found that the Government of Canada essentially forced Dingwall out when he released his findings in a binding arbitration ruling.

== Legal career ==
A member of the Nova Scotia Barristers’ Society and Law Society of Upper Canada, Dingwall was associated with the law firm of Sampson McDougall in Sydney, Nova Scotia, and was counsel to the law firm of Affleck Greene McMurtry LLP.

== Academic career ==
For the 2011–2012 academic year, Dingwall was a distinguished visiting professor at the Ted Rogers School of Management at Ryerson University.

== Community involvement ==
Dingwall is a member of the board of directors of the Canada/China Business Council, a founding member of the Toronto Arbitrators’ Society, president of the Metropolitan Toronto Condominium Corporation.

== As President of Cape Breton University ==
On January 31, 2018, Dingwall was appointed president and vice-chancellor of Cape Breton University by the university's board of governors.

== Electoral results ==
1997 Canadian federal election: Cape Breton—Canso
Party	Candidate	Votes	%
New Democratic	Michelle Dockrill	17,575	41.30
Liberal	David Dingwall	16,358	38.44
Progressive Conservative	Frank Crowdis	8,620	20.26
Total valid votes		42,553	100.00

26th Canadian Ministry (1993–2003) – Cabinet of Jean Chrétien
Cabinet posts (5)
Predecessor	Office	Successor
legislation enacted	Minister of Health; 1996–1997	Allan Rock
Diane Marleau	Minister of National Health and Welfare; 1996 styled as Minister of Health	legislation enacted
Paul Dick	Minister of Public Works; 1993–1996 styled as Minister of Public Works and Government Services	Diane Marleau
Paul Dick	Minister of Supply and Services; 1993–1996 styled as Minister of Public Works and Government Services	Diane Marleau
Ross Reid	Minister for the Atlantic Canada Opportunities Agency; 1993–1996	John Manley
Other offices
Preceded by Emmanuel Triassi (acting)	Royal Canadian Mint President; 2003–2005	Succeeded by Marguerite Nadeau (acting)
