= Neil Ferguson (Canadian politician) =

Canadian politician from Nova Scotia (1856-1927)

Member of the Nova Scotia House of Assembly for Cape Breton County
- In office June 20, 1916 – July 27, 1920

Personal details
- Born: November 22, 1856 Blue Ridge, Nova Scotia
- Died: January 18, 1927 (aged 70) Marion Bridge, Nova Scotia
- Party: Liberal Conservative
- Spouse: Margaret Lamond
- Occupation: teacher, merchant, politician

Neil Ferguson (sometimes Fergusson) (November 22, 1856 – January 18, 1927) was a teacher, merchant, and political figure in Nova Scotia, Canada. He represented Cape Breton County in the Nova Scotia House of Assembly from 1916 to 1920 as a Liberal Conservative member. He was elected in the 1916 Nova Scotia general election and did not contest any other provincial elections.
