= Greg MacLeod =

Canadian priest and educator (1935–2017)

Greg MacLeod OC
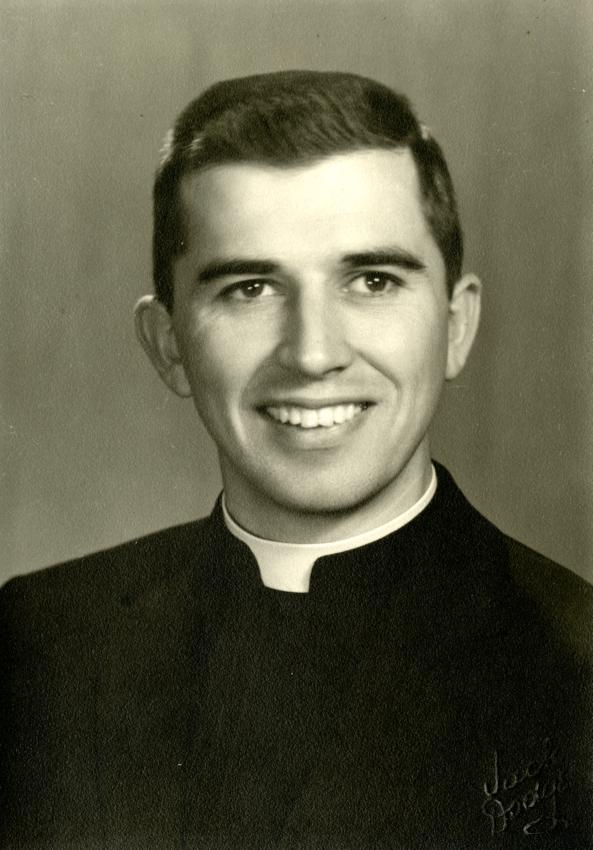
- Born: 1935; Sydney Mines, Nova Scotia, Canada
- Died: 3 May 2017 (aged 81)
- Occupations: Priest; professor
- Awards: Order of Canada

Greg MacLeod OC (1935 – 3 May 2017) was a Canadian priest and educator from Cape Breton, Nova Scotia. Born in Sydney Mines in 1935, MacLeod attended the Holy Heart Seminary in Halifax and was ordained as a priest in 1961. In 1974 he become a professor of philosophy at the College of Cape Breton where he was involved in community organizations focused on economic and social development. He was a member of the Order of Canada. An account and analysis of MacLeod's life and community efforts was published in two books in 2019.

== Life ==
MacLeod was born to a family of nine in Sydney Mines, Nova Scotia in 1935. His father worked in a coal mine, and died when MacLeod was seven years old. As a child he sold newspapers to provide income for his family.

MacLeod was educated at Xavier Junior College in Sydney. He studied there for two years before moving to mainland Nova Scotia to complete his studies. Following his graduation, MacLeod attended the Holy Heart Seminary in Halifax, and was subsequently ordained as a priest in 1961. He earned a doctorate in philosophy from the University of Louvain in Belgium, followed by post-doctoral studies at Oxford University.

MacLeod became a professor of philosophy at the College of Cape Breton (later Cape Breton University) in 1974, where he founded the Tompkins Institute for Human Values and Technology.

Through his work with the Tompkins Institute at Cape Breton University, MacLeod was the founder of two community organizations focused on driving economic development, namely New Dawn Enterprises and Banking Community Assets Group. He was known to donate part of his salary to the Beaton Institute and other causes.

In 2016, CTV News erroneously reported that MacLeod was a distant relative of Donald Trump. They later retracted the story after discovering it was an April Fools' Day prank.

MacLeod was a member of the Order of Canada. He died at the age of 81 on 3 May 2017. He was remembered by Chief Terry Paul of Membertou First Nation as "a very instrumental person for Cape Breton."

== Legacy ==
In 2019, an account of MacLeod's life and community efforts written by Daniel Doucet was released, titled Father Greg: A Life. A second book by Harvey Johnstone titled Boundary Exploration: The Entrepreneurial Experiments of Fr. Greg MacLeod was published the same year and provides insight on the cultural and economic impact of MacLeod's work.

== See also ==
- Antigonish Movement
