= Angus Gladstone Buchanan =

Canadian politician

Angus Gladstone Buchanan (August 24, 1893 – September 12, 1960) was a fish merchant and political figure in Nova Scotia, Canada. He represented Victoria County in the Nova Scotia House of Assembly from 1920 to 1925 as a Liberal member.

He was born in Neil Harbour, Nova Scotia, the son of Angus A. Buchanan and Mary Isabel McLeod. Buchanan was educated at the Halifax Academy and McGill University. In 1922, he married Katherine MacLeod. Buchanan later served as chief warden for Cape Breton Highlands National Park. He lived at Neil's Harbour, later residing at Ingonish Beach within the National Park. Buchanan died at Portland, Maine on September 12, 1960.
