= Richmond—West Cape Breton =

Former federal electoral district in Nova Scotia, Canada

Nova Scotia electoral district

Defunct federal electoral district
- Legislature: House of Commons
- District created: 1924
- District abolished: 1933 (Note: The law to merge Richmond—West Cape Breton into Inverness—Richmond was passed in 1933, and carried out in 1935. Until it was carried out, Richmond—West Cape Breton continued to be represented by Edgar Nelson Rhodes.)
- First contested: 1925
- Last contested: 1930 by-election

Demographics
- Census division(s): Cape Breton, Richmond

Richmond—West Cape Breton was a federal electoral district in the province of Nova Scotia, Canada, that was represented in the House of Commons of Canada from 1925 to 1935. This riding was created in 1924 from Cape Breton South and Richmond riding. It consisted of the County of Richmond and the part of the County of Cape Breton lying east of East Bay and south of the electoral district of Cape Breton South. It was abolished with a law passed to merge Richmond—West Cape Breton into Inverness—Richmond in 1933, which was duly carried out in 1935 with the election of the first member to the new riding.

== Members of Parliament ==
This riding elected the following members of Parliament:

Parliament	Years	Member	Party
Richmond—West Cape Breton; Riding created from Cape Breton South and Richmond
15th	1925–1926	John Alexander Macdonald	Conservative
16th	1926–1930	John Alexander Macdonald	Conservative
17th	1930–1930	John Alexander Macdonald	Conservative
17th	1930–1935	Edgar Nelson Rhodes	Conservative
Riding dissolved into Inverness—Richmond

== Election results ==
1925 Canadian federal election
Party	Candidate	Votes
Conservative	MACDONALD, John Alexander	3,962
Liberal	KYTE, George William	3,252
Source:History of the Federal Electoral Ridings, 1867—1980

1926 Canadian federal election
Party	Candidate	Votes
Conservative	MACDONALD, John Alexander	3,769
Liberal	BOYD, Donald D.	3,280
Source:History of the Federal Electoral Ridings, 1867—1980

1930 Canadian federal election
Party	Candidate	Votes
Conservative	MACDONALD, John Alexander	4,085
Liberal	DOYLE, Edward Charles	3,413
Source:History of the Federal Electoral Ridings, 1867—1980

The by-election was called due to Macdonald's acceptance of a paid role, or office of emolument, from the Crown on 22 August 1930.

By-election on 2 September 1930
Party	Candidate	Votes
Conservative	RHODES, Hon. Edgar Nelson	acclaimed
Source:History of the Federal Electoral Ridings, 1867—1980

== See also ==
- List of Canadian electoral districts
- Historical federal electoral districts of Canada
