= J. B. McLachlan =

Canadian politician (1869–1937)

James Bryson McLachlan
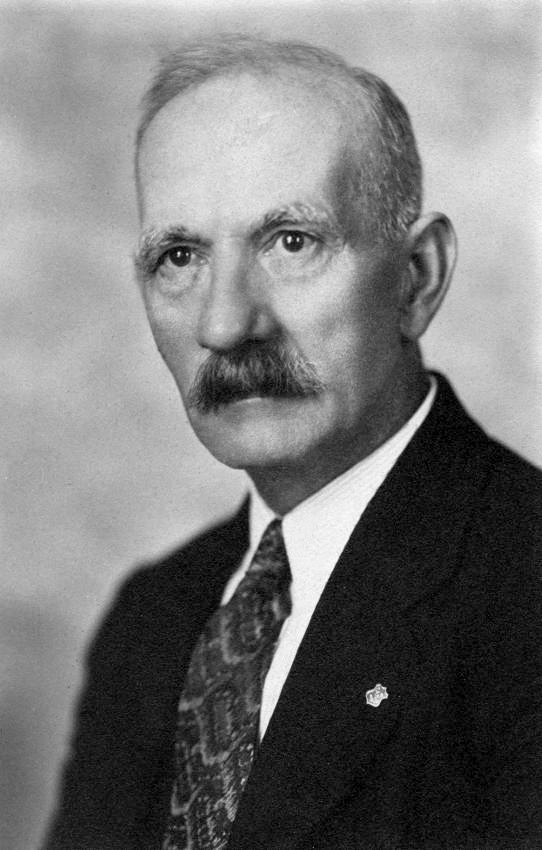
- Portrait, 1933

Personal details
- Born: 9 February 1869 Ecclefechan, Scotland
- Died: 3 November 1937 (aged 68) Glace Bay, Nova Scotia, Canada
- Cause of death: Tuberculosis
- Party: Socialist Party of Canada Communist Party of Canada Farmer–Labour
- Spouse: Kate Greenshields (m. 1893–1937)
- Children: 9
- Occupation: Trade Unionist; journalist; coal miner

James Bryson (J.B.) McLachlan (9 February 1869 – 3 November 1937) was a prominent Scottish-Canadian trade unionist, journalist, revolutionary and political activist. McLachlan was a notable leader of the Canadian Labour Revolt.

== Biography ==
The son of Esther Bryson and James McLachlan, James Bryson McLachlan was born in Ecclefechan, Scotland, on 9 February 1869. Growing up in rural Dumfriesshire both his parents worked as farmer-labourers and cotton weavers. Eventually his family would move up north to Newmains in Lanarkshire in which his father would be employed by the Coltness Iron Company to work in the coal mines. At the age of 10 McLachlan left school to go work in the coal mines, and whilst he never received a formal education he continued to read and teach himself about the world.

In 1902 McLachlan took a job with the Nova Scotia Steel and Coal Company and later worked at the Princess colliery in Sydney Mines. McLachlan took local prominence as a leader in the coalminer's union, the Provincial Workmen’s Association, which had been established in 1879 under the name of the Provincial Miners’ Association.

== Political activity ==
In 1916 he stood as a Socialist candidate for Nova Scotia's provincial House of Assembly. He received 1,038 votes, which put him in last place.

McLachlan served as president of Independent Labour Party of Cape Breton from 1917 to 1918. After his resignation in 1918, he served as honorary president of the party.

In 1921 he was the Farmer–Labour candidate for the two-member Cape Breton South and Richmond riding in the December federal election. His candidacy was denounced and mocked by the local newspaper, the Conservative Sydney Post. McLachlan received a majority of the votes cast in the riding's mining districts, and he led the polls in Sydney. His vote tally of 8,914 votes was just a bit less than that of the two candidates who were elected in the riding.

In 1925 he ran as a Labour candidate in the Cape Breton South riding but was not elected, coming in third.

Twice after 1925, McLachlan ran for provincial office. He received 2,589 votes in 1928. In 1933, when his campaign was assisted by well-spoken A.A. MacLeod, he received 1,737 votes.

McLachlan ran again in the Cape Breton South riding in the 1935 federal election, this time as a Communist Party candidate. He received 5,365 votes.

== Legacy ==
McLachlan's life of activism is told in David Frank's prizewinning book, J.B. McLachlan: A Biography (Toronto: James Lorimer and Company 1999).
