= Malcolm MacInnis =

Canadian politician

Member of Parliament for Cape Breton South
- In office September 1962 – April 1963
- Preceded by: Donald MacInnis
- Succeeded by: Donald MacInnis

Personal details
- Born: May 22, 1933 Halifax, Nova Scotia, Canada
- Died: March 12, 2023 (aged 89)
- Party: New Democratic
- Profession: educator

Malcolm "Vic" MacInnis (May 22, 1933 – March 12, 2023) was a Canadian educator and politician. He served as a New Democratic Party member of the House of Commons of Canada.

Born in Halifax, Nova Scotia, MacInnis was first elected at the Cape Breton South riding in the 1962 general election defeating incumbent Donald MacInnis, a Progressive Conservative party member. After serving his only term, the 25th Canadian Parliament, MacInnis was defeated in the 1963 election by Donald MacInnis.
