= Arthur R. Richardson =

Canadian politician

Arthur R. Richardson (May 13, 1862 – January 7, 1936) was a pilot, farmer and political figure in Nova Scotia, Canada. He represented Cape Breton County in the Nova Scotia House of Assembly from 1920 to 1925 as a Farmer-Labour member.

He was born in Sydney, Nova Scotia, the son of William J. Richardson and Mary Ann Brown. In 1892, he married Frances A. Wyman. He died at South Bar, Sydney at the age of 73.
