= Joseph Matheson =

Canadian politician

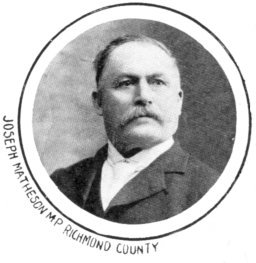
Joseph Matheson

Joseph Matheson (May 7, 1833 – September 23, 1915) was a merchant and political figure in Nova Scotia, Canada. He represented Richmond County in the Nova Scotia House of Assembly from 1886 to 1897. He was a Liberal member of the House of Commons of Canada for the Richmond riding from 1900 to 1904.

He was born in Grand River, Nova Scotia, the son of Scottish immigrants, and married Maria S., the daughter of Josiah Hooper, a former member of the Nova Scotia assembly, in 1864. Matheson was postmaster for Lower L'Ardoise from 1866 to 1886.
