= John Carey Douglas =

Canadian politician (1874–1926)

Member of the Canadian Parliament for Cape Breton South and Richmond
- In office 1917–1921
- Preceded by: District was abolished in 1914.
- Succeeded by: William F. Carroll

Member of the Canadian Parliament for Antigonish—Guysborough
- In office 1926–1926
- Preceded by: Edward Mortimer Macdonald
- Succeeded by: William Duff

Member of the Nova Scotia House of Assembly for Cape Breton County
- In office 1911–1916

Member of the Nova Scotia House of Assembly for Cape Breton East
- In office 1925–1926

Personal details
- Born: July 14, 1874 Stellarton, Nova Scotia, Canada
- Died: December 10, 1926 (aged 52)

John Carey Douglas (July 14, 1874 – December 10, 1926) was a Canadian politician.

Born in Stellarton, Nova Scotia, the son of John and Ann (Carey) Douglas, Douglas was educated in public schools, in Stellarton, at Pictou Academy and Mount Allison University where he received a Bachelor of Arts degree in 1897 and a Master of Arts in 1909. He received a Bachelor of Law degree from Dalhousie University in 1899 and was called to the Bar in 1900. In 1901, he started a legal practice in Glace Bay, Nova Scotia. From 1908 to 1911, he was mayor of Glace Bay. From 1911 to 1916, he was a Liberal-Conservative member of the Nova Scotia House of Assembly for Cape Breton County. He was elected to the House of Commons of Canada as the Unionist candidate for the electoral district of Cape Breton South and Richmond in the 1917 election. He was defeated in the 1921 election.

From 1925 to 1926, he was a member again of the Nova Scotia House of Assembly. He was also Minister of Lands and Forests and Attorney General in the cabinet of Edgar Nelson Rhodes. He was elected to the Canadian House of Commons as the Conservative candidate for the electoral district of Antigonish—Guysborough in the 1926 election. He died a short while later in December 1926.

1926 Canadian federal election: Antigonish—Guysborough
Party	Candidate	Votes
Progressive Conservative	John Carey Douglas	6,140
Liberal	Colin Francis McIsaac	6,003
