= Colin Chisholm (politician) =

Canadian lawyer and politician

Colin Chisholm (1848, Long Point, Nova Scotia – 15 February 1901, Sydney, Nova Scotia) was a lawyer and political figure in Nova Scotia, Canada. He represented Cape Breton County in the Nova Scotia House of Assembly from 1886 to 1890 as a Liberal-Conservative member.

He was born in Inverness County, Nova Scotia, the son of Roderick Chisholm, of Scottish descent. He studied law with John Thompson and set up practice in Sydney. In 1885, he married Evaline McInnis. Chisholm served as municipal clerk for Cape Breton. Chisholm died at the age of 50.
