= William MacKay (politician) =

Canadian physician

William MacKay (September 11, 1847 – November 8, 1915) was a physician and political figure in Nova Scotia, Canada. He represented Cape Breton County in the Nova Scotia House of Assembly from 1886 to 1890 and from 1894 to 1897 as a Conservative member and sat for Cape Breton division in the Senate of Canada from 1912 to 1915.

== Biography ==
William MacKay was born on 11 September 1847 in Earltown, Nova Scotia to parents John and Dolina MacKay. His father immigrated Nova Scotia from Scotland in the 1820s and erected Earltown's first grist mill. William MacKay received his early education in Truro, subsequently attending the Bellevue Hospital Medical College in New York where he earned a Doctor of Medicine on 10 November 1873. After graduating from the college, MacKay practiced medicine with his brother in Cape Breton, before being appointed as the resident physician for three local collieries in May 1874. While working at colliers, MacKay developed a system of quarantining infectious diseases in mining districts which was eventually used across Cape Breton County. MacKay twice served as the president of the Cape Breton Medical Society, and was the president of the Medical Society of Nova Scotia in 1887 and 1888.

MacKay was elected as a Conservative member of the Nova Scotia House of Assembly in 1886. Together with Edward Farrell, MacKay wrote and introduced the Public Health Act of 1888, an act which established local health boards and established regulations on medical quarantine and sanitation. MacKay lost his seat in the 1890 election, but was re-elected in 1894. He lost his seat again in 1897, and ran unsuccessfully in the 1904 election. He was appointed to the Senate on 20 November 1912.

MacKay was married to Catherine Campbell Sutherland, with whom he had three children. He died on 8 November 1915 in Reserve Mines.
