= Atlantic School of Theology =

Ecumenical university in Canada

Coordinates: 44°37′45.91″N 63°34′37.28″W

- Established: 1971
- Religious affiliation: Christian
- President: Heather McCance
- Faculty: 10 full-time; 8 sessional
- Students: 69 (Fall 2026)
- Undergraduates: 17
- Postgraduates: 52
- Location: Halifax, Nova Scotia, Canada
- Campus: Urban
- Colours: Blue; burgundy; white
- Website: astheology.ns.ca

Atlantic School of Theology (AST) is a Christian public ecumenical university located in Halifax, Nova Scotia, Canada. The university provides undergraduate and graduate level theological education.

== History ==
Atlantic School of Theology was founded in 1971 and formally incorporated on June 28, 1974, by an act of the Legislature of Nova Scotia. The institution was formed following a merger of the following institutions:

- Faculty of Divinity, University of King's College (Anglican Church of Canada)
- Holy Heart Theological Institute, formerly the Holy Heart Seminary (Roman Catholic Church)
- Pine Hill Divinity Hall (United Church of Canada)

Theological education has been offered on the Halifax property since 1848, with AST occupying the former campus of Pine Hill Divinity Hall. The former Holy Heart Theological Institute was destroyed by fire in 1975.

AST is accredited by the Association of Theological Schools in the United States and Canada, and is a member of the Maritime Provinces Higher Education Commission. In 2002, AST began affiliating with nearby Saint Mary's University. Both remain independent institutions and grant their own degrees, but collaborate to offer joint and complementary academic courses and programs.

== Academics ==
AST offers an undergraduate Bachelor of Theology program, as well as Master of Divinity and Master of Arts in Theology and Religion (offered in collaboration with Saint Mary's University) graduate programs. Additionally, the institution offers diploma programs in theological studies, new evangelization, and intergenerational faith formation, and certificate programs in stewardship and graduate theological studies.

== Notable alumni ==
- Fred Hiltz – former Primate of the Anglican Church of Canada
- Greg MacLeod (Holy Heart Seminary) – former priest and educator in Cape Breton
- Joseph-Aurèle Plourde (Holy Heart Seminary) – former Roman Catholic Archbishop of Ottawa
- Richard William Smith – Metropolitan Archbishop of Vancouver

== See also ==
- Higher education in Nova Scotia
- List of universities in Nova Scotia
