= Joseph Steele =

Canadian politician

Joseph Steele (September 12, 1881 –? ) was a carpenter and political figure in Nova Scotia, Canada. He represented Cape Breton County in the Nova Scotia House of Assembly from 1920 to 1925 as an Independent Labour member.

He was born in Souris, Prince Edward Island, the son of A.D. Steele and Jessie Gillis. In 1895, Steele married Jessie Macdonald. Steele lived in Sydney, Nova Scotia and was secretary-treasurer of the Trades and Labour Council. He was defeated when he ran for reelection in 1925.
