= Sydney Mines =

Community in Nova Scotia, Canada

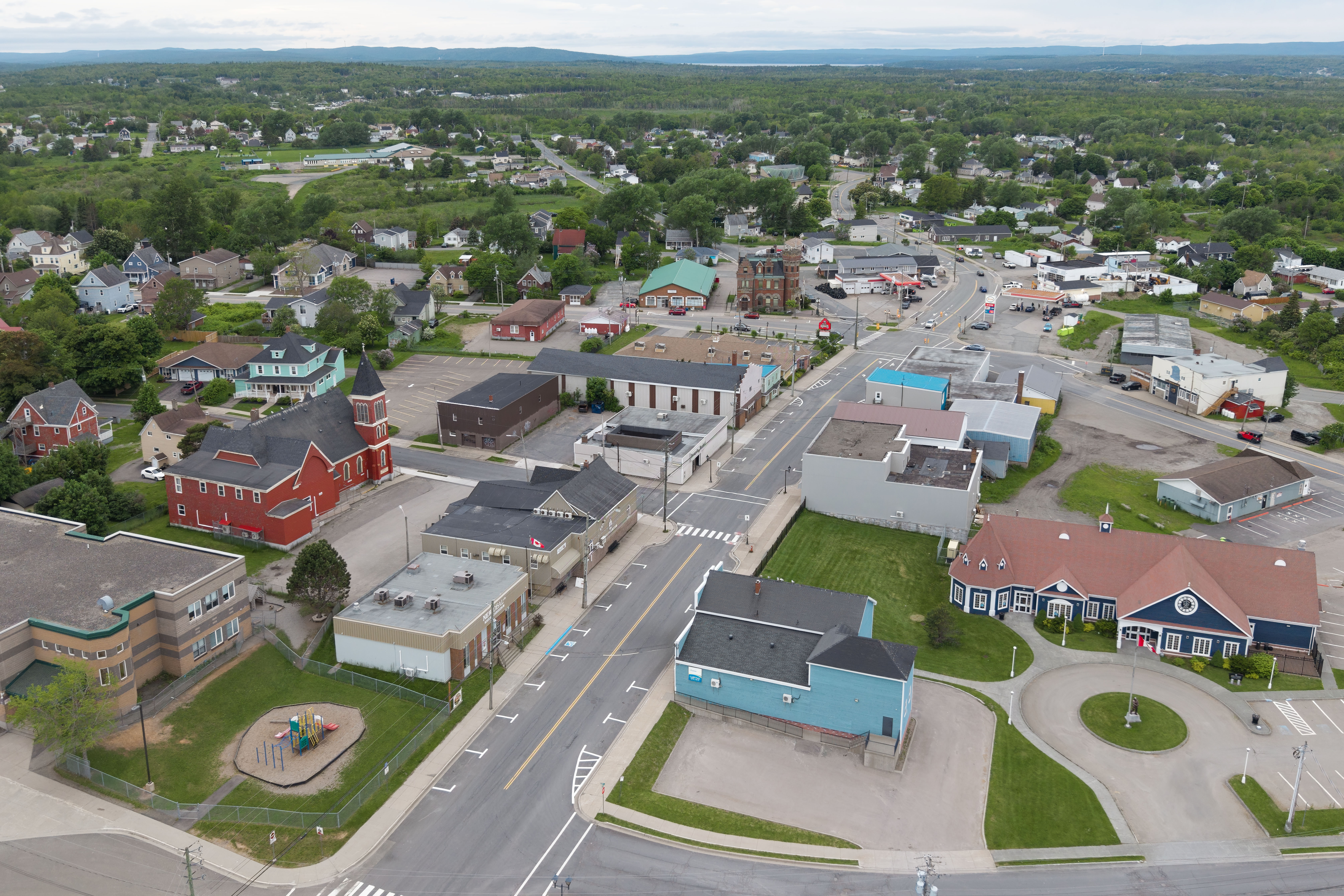
- Downtown (2026)

- Location of Sydney Mines, Nova Scotia
- Coordinates: 46°14′15″N 60°13′10″W
- Country: Canada
- Provinces of Canada: Nova Scotia
- Regional Municipality: Cape Breton Regional Municipality
- Incorporated Town: 1889
- Amalgamated: August 1, 1995

Population (2021) From Statistics Canada
  - Total: 12,353
- Time zone: UTC-4 (AST)
  - Summer (DST): UTC-3 (ADT)
- Canadian Postal code: B1V
- Area code: 902

Sydney Mines is a community and former town in Cape Breton Regional Municipality, Nova Scotia, Canada.

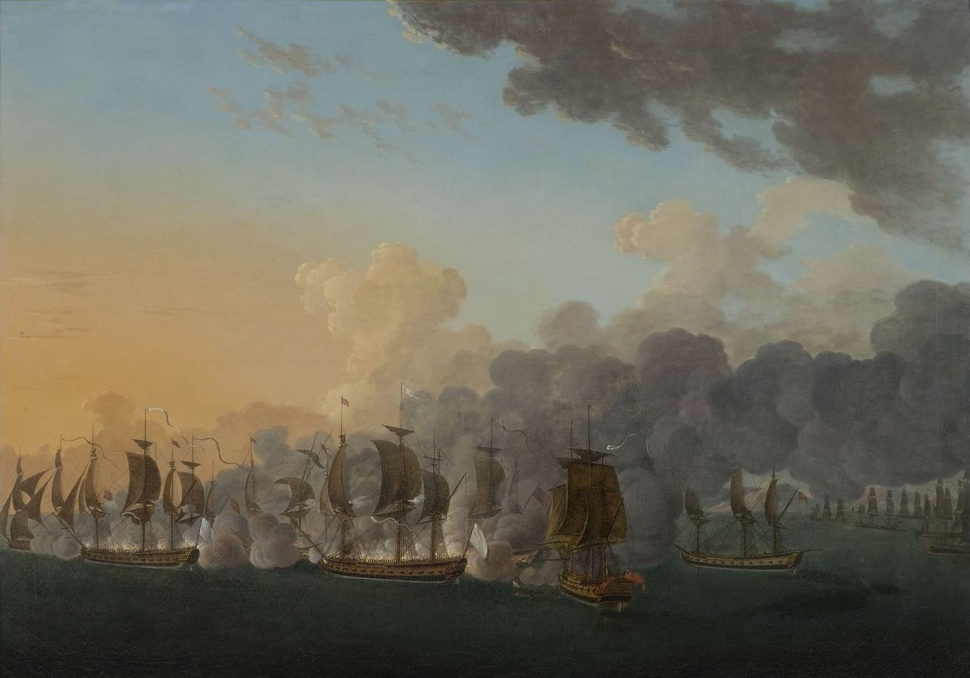
Naval Battle off Sydney Mines

Founded in 1784, and incorporated as a town in 1889, Sydney Mines has a rich history in coal production although mining activity has now ceased. Prior to a permanent settlement being established, there was significant activity along the shore. Upon the success of coal mining operations, the Nova Scotia Steel and Coal Company constructed a steel plant in Sydney Mines in 1902. The plant, alongside the steel plant in Sydney owned by the Dominion Iron and Steel Company combined to produce more than 50% of Canada's steel during World War I. The plant was later sold to the British Empire Steel Corporation and ceased operations years later.

== History ==
Historical populations
Year	Pop.	±%
1871	1,494	—
1881	2,340	+56.6%
1891	2,442	+4.4%
1901	3,191	+30.7%
1911	7,470	+134.1%
1921	8,327	+11.5%
1931	7,769	−6.7%
1941	8,157	+5.0%
1951	8,410	+3.1%
1956	8,731	+3.8%
1961	9,122	+4.5%
1971	8,991	−1.4%
1981	8,501	−5.4%
1986	8,063	−5.2%
1991	7,551	−6.3%
2001	16,068	+112.8%
2006	15,500	−3.5%
2011	14,135	−8.8%
2016	12,823	−9.3%
2021	12,353	−3.7%

The area of Sydney Mines was originally called Klmuejuapskwe'katik, or 'place of the coal' in Mi'kmawi'simk.

During the American Revolution, the British used the coal mines of Sydney Mines to supply the British loyalists in Boston until forced to evacuate and for troops and the inhabitants at Halifax. American and French ships made great efforts to interrupt this vital supply line. On November 1, 1776, John Paul Jones – the father of the American Navy – set sail in command of Alfred to free hundreds of American prisoners working in the area's coal mines. Although winter conditions prevented the freeing of the prisoners, the mission did result in the capture of Mellish, a vessel carrying a vital supply of winter clothing intended for John Burgoyne's troops in Canada.

Major Timothy Hierlihy and his regiment on board HMS Hope worked in and protected from privateer attacks on the coal mines at Sydney Cape Breton. Sydney Cape Breton provided a vital supply of coal for Halifax throughout the war. The British began developing the mining site at Sydney Mines in 1777. On 14 May 1778, Major Hierlihy arrived at Cape Breton. While there, Hierlihy reported that he "beat off many piratical attacks, killed some and took other prisoners."

A few years into the war there was also a naval engagement between French ships and a British convoy off Sydney, Nova Scotia, near Spanish River (1781), Cape Breton. Six French sailors were killed and 17 British, with many more wounded.

Sydney Mines lies immediately northeast of North Sydney and faces Sydney across Sydney Harbour. Sydney Mines was once a major coal-producing community. Mining began locally in 1766, and in 1830 systematic operations were undertaken. One of the area mines extended about 5 miles (8 km) out under the sea. The last mine was closed in 1975.

Sydney Mines is on the northern side of Sydney Harbour, near the mouth. It was earlier known as the Mines due to the coal mines abundant nearby. Although mining has been carried on since 1724, the first shaft for the General Mining Association in Sydney Mines was sunk in 1830. Manufacturing enterprises included corrugated steel culverts and the British Canadian Co-operative Society Limited, operating a dairy and a bakery.

Sydney Mines was the filming location for the 1981 horror movie My Bloody Valentine.

== Climate ==
Sydney Mines

Climate chart (precipitation, max. and min. temperature)
J	F	M	A	M	J	J	A	S	O	N	D
99 1 −7	95 1 −8	95 3 −6	120 8 −1	105 14 3	137 19 9	95 25 14	121 25 15	122 21 11	144 15 6	159 9 1	154 4 −3
- █ Average max. and min. temperatures in °C
- █ Precipitation totals in mm
- Source: Cape Breton Mesonet
Imperial conversion
J	F	M	A	M	J	J	A	S	O	N	D
3.9 34 20	3.7 33 17	3.8 38 22	4.7 47 31	4.1 57 38	5.4 66 48	3.7 76 58	4.7 77 58	4.8 69 51	5.7 58 42	6.3 48 34	6.1 38 27
- █ Average max. and min. temperatures in °F
- █ Precipitation totals in inches

As with the rest of Nova Scotia, Sydney Mines experiences seasonal lag and has a relatively slow, cool start to summer in June and early July. Proximity to the Atlantic Ocean is a large contributor to this, as the ocean is much colder than the land at that time of year, and sea breezes from the Cabot Strait are frequent. However, the surrounding water bodies warm rapidly through July and sea breezes become much less common. Also, onset of the Bermuda High in July brings warm southwest winds to the area, which dominate the remainder of the summer into September. With an average daily high temperature near 25 °C (77 °F) in July and August, conditions are quite comfortable, albeit very humid at times. August is the warmest month, and sunniest, based on percent possible sunshine.

Sydney Mines experiences cold, windy, wet, snowy and very stormy winters. Although low in latitude compared to the rest of Canada and bordering the ocean. Sydney Mines borders the very cold Labrador ocean current. This causes for a cold and very snowy winter. Daytime highs during the winter usually stick around minus 2 degrees Celsius but the fact Sydney Mines lies around the polar jet stream causes it to experience arctic outbreaks and very warm thaws. Sydney Mines, much like the rest of Atlantic Canada, is one of the warmest areas in Canada during the winter but they receives the most snowstorms in Canada. Cold arctic temperatures meet up with the warm Gulf Stream and form one of the most powerful storms in the world. Many people who live in Eastern Canada know the term Nor'easter, which can dump huge amounts of snow to Sydney Mines and the rest of Atlantic Canada.

Since records began in 2007, the highest temperature ever recorded in Sydney Mines is 34.4 °C (93.9 °F) on 15 July 2013. The coldest temperature ever recorded was −25.5 °C (−13.9 °F) on 7 March 2015.

Climate data for Sydney Mines, 2007–2024 normals, extremes 2007–present
Month	Jan	Feb	Mar	Apr	May	Jun	Jul	Aug	Sep	Oct	Nov	Dec	Year
Record high °C (°F)	14.7 (58.5)	14.8 (58.6)	23.7 (74.7)	25.3 (77.5)	30.8 (87.4)	33.9 (93.0)	34.4 (93.9)	33.6 (92.5)	32.3 (90.1)	25.9 (78.6)	23.0 (73.4)	17.1 (62.8)	34.4 (93.9)
Mean maximum °C (°F)	9.9 (49.8)	9.6 (49.3)	12.3 (54.1)	19.0 (66.2)	25.7 (78.3)	28.7 (83.7)	31.1 (88.0)	30.5 (86.9)	28.1 (82.6)	21.9 (71.4)	18.4 (65.1)	13.4 (56.1)	32.2 (90.0)
Mean daily maximum °C (°F)	0.9 (33.6)	0.5 (32.9)	3.1 (37.6)	8.2 (46.8)	13.9 (57.0)	18.9 (66.0)	24.6 (76.3)	24.8 (76.6)	20.6 (69.1)	14.5 (58.1)	8.9 (48.0)	3.5 (38.3)	11.9 (53.4)
Daily mean °C (°F)	−2.8 (27.0)	−3.7 (25.3)	−1.2 (29.8)	3.6 (38.5)	8.5 (47.3)	13.6 (56.5)	19.1 (66.4)	19.5 (67.1)	15.7 (60.3)	10.1 (50.2)	5.1 (41.2)	0.4 (32.7)	7.3 (45.1)
Mean daily minimum °C (°F)	−6.8 (19.8)	−8.4 (16.9)	−5.6 (21.9)	−0.7 (30.7)	3.4 (38.1)	8.9 (48.0)	14.2 (57.6)	14.7 (58.5)	10.7 (51.3)	5.6 (42.1)	1.1 (34.0)	−3.0 (26.6)	2.8 (37.0)
Mean minimum °C (°F)	−16.1 (3.0)	−18.3 (−0.9)	−15.9 (3.4)	−7.2 (19.0)	−2.8 (27.0)	2.5 (36.5)	8.0 (46.4)	8.6 (47.5)	2.7 (36.9)	−0.9 (30.4)	−5.5 (22.1)	−10.5 (13.1)	−19.6 (−3.3)
Record low °C (°F)	−20.6 (−5.1)	−25.0 (−13.0)	−25.5 (−13.9)	−12.8 (9.0)	−5.1 (22.8)	−0.3 (31.5)	4.3 (39.7)	5.6 (42.1)	0.6 (33.1)	−4.1 (24.6)	−9.1 (15.6)	−16.3 (2.7)	−25.5 (−13.9)
Average rainfall mm (inches)	98.7 (3.89)	94.6 (3.72)	95.3 (3.75)	120.1 (4.73)	105.3 (4.15)	137.1 (5.40)	94.7 (3.73)	120.6 (4.75)	121.6 (4.79)	143.6 (5.65)	159.0 (6.26)	154.2 (6.07)	1,444.8 (56.88)
Average relative humidity (%)	82.7	82.5	79.7	80.6	81.4	83.6	82.6	83.6	83.5	83.7	83.5	85.5	82.7
Mean monthly sunshine hours	87.0	122.8	179.7	184.6	227.7	220.6	264.4	252.5	198.2	144.2	101.4	72.9	2,056
Percentage possible sunshine	30.7	41.7	48.5	45.3	49.0	46.8	55.5	57.7	52.7	42.5	35.7	26.4	44.4
Source: Cape Breton Mesonet

== Education ==
Sydney Mines has one elementary school, Jubilee Elementary (home to the Johnny Miles Gym), one middle school, Sydney Mines Middle School, one high school, Memorial Composite High School.

== Landmarks ==
In front of Jubilee Elementary on Main Street, there is a bronze statue of Johnny Miles in a running pose. There is a script on it with a small quote and the dates Johnny Miles won the Boston Marathon.

In front of the John J. Nugent Firemen's Centre on Elliot Street (across from the fire station), there is a firefighter statue which represents all the past fire chiefs of the Sydney Mines Volunteer Fire Department.

Another Sydney Mines landmark is Trinity Anglican Church on Queen Street. Trinity was designed by Maritime architect William Critchlow Harris. The church also contains a large painting by Robert Harris, the architect's brother. Robert Harris is famous for painting the official portrait of the Fathers of Confederation. Trinity is one of only two surviving buildings that combine the talents of these two Victorian-era brothers. All Souls' Chapel in Charlottetown is the other.

== Notable people ==
- Tony Currie, ice hockey forward
- David James Hartigan, member of the House of Commons of Canada
- Joseph Macdonald, member of the Nova Scotia House of Assembly
- Matthew MacLean, member of the House of Commons of Canada
- Greg MacLeod, priest and educator
- John McCormick, member of the Nova Scotia House of Assembly
- Alexander O'Handley, teacher, lawyer, and member of the Nova Scotia House of Assembly
- Annon Lee Silver, operatic soprano with the Phoenix Opera and the Welsh National Opera
- Forman Waye, member of the Nova Scotia House of Assembly
- The Barra MacNeils, musicians
- Margaret Sibella Brown, botanist
- Bruce Guthro, Singer, Lead vocalist of Scottish folk band Runrig
