= John McCormick (Canadian politician) =

Canadian politician

John McCormick (October 16, 1858 – February 21, 1936) was a merchant and political figure in Nova Scotia, Canada. He represented Cape Breton County in the Nova Scotia House of Assembly from 1894 to 1897 as a Liberal-Conservative. McCormick sat for Sydney Mines division in the Senate of Canada from 1921 to 1936.

He was born in Sydney Mines, Nova Scotia, the son of John McCormick and Catherine McDonald, both immigrants from Scotland. McCormick was mayor of Sydney Mines from 1900 to 1906. He was an unsuccessful candidate for a seat in the House of Commons in 1904, 1908 and 1917. McCormick died in office in Sydney Mines at the age of 77.

His brother Alex C. McCormick, his partner in business, also served as mayor of Sydney Mines.
