= William Joseph Croke =

Canadian politician

William Joseph Croke (1840 – March 11, 1869) was a Nova Scotia lawyer and political figure. He represented Richmond in the House of Commons of Canada as a member of the Anti-Confederation Party from 1867 to 1869.

Croke practised law in Arichat, Nova Scotia. He died in office at Halifax in 1869 at the age of 29.

1867 Canadian federal election: Richmond
Party	Candidate	Votes
Anti-Confederation	William Joseph Croke	545
Unknown	Mr. Donovan	279
