= Percy Wright =

Canadian politician (1892–1980)

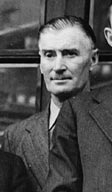
- Wright in September 1944

Member of Parliament for Melfort
- In office 16 May 1940 – 13 June 1953
- Preceded by: Malcolm MacLean
- Succeeded by: riding dissolved

Personal details
- Born: Percy Ellis Wright; 1 November 1892 Beachburg, Ontario, Canada
- Died: 30 September 1980 (aged 87) Saskatoon, Saskatchewan, Canada
- Party: Co-operative Commonwealth Federation
- Spouse(s): Alice I. Dougherty m. 28 February 1922
- Profession: farmer

Percy Ellis Wright (1 November 1892 – 30 September 1980) was a Canadian democratic socialist politician. He was a member of the Co-operative Commonwealth Federation (CCF), and served over 13 years as a Member of Parliament (MP) in the House of Commons of Canada. He served on the CCF's national council and executive, and was elected as the CCF's National Chairman in 1950. After he was defeated as an MP, he returned to his occupation as a farmer until his death in 1980.

Wright was born in Beachburg, Ontario, and attended Jarvis Collegiate Institute in Toronto. He served in the Canadian Field Artillery during World War I and became a lieutenant. His career was in farming.

He was first elected to Parliament from the Melfort electoral district in the 1940 federal election. He was re-elected in 1945 and 1949. When the Melfort electoral district was abolished, in the 1952 federal riding redistribution, Wright sought re-election in Melville, which contained roughly half of his old riding. It was also the electoral district of incumbent federal Minister of Agriculture James Garfield Gardiner of the Liberal party. In the 1953 federal election Wright was defeated by Gardiner, ending his political career.

When F. R. Scott retired as the national chairman, just before the CCF's biennial convention in Vancouver in July 1950, there was a rift between the farmer and labour wings. Wright represented the farmer-wing, while Vancouver's Angus MacInnis, the son-in-law of former party founding leader J.S. Woodsworth, represented the labour-wing. Wright defeated MacInnis in the election to be the CCF's National Chairman. He was elected again in 1952. At the 1954 convention Wright retired as national chairman, and David Lewis was elected to replace him. He died in 1980.
