= Melfort (federal electoral district) =

Former federal electoral district in Saskatchewan, Canada

Melfort was a federal electoral district in Saskatchewan, Canada, that was represented in the House of Commons of Canada from 1925 to 1953. It was created in 1924 from Prince Albert riding, and was abolished in 1952 when it was redistributed into Humboldt—Melfort, Mackenzie, Prince Albert, and Rosthern ridings.

== Members of Parliament ==
This riding elected the following members of Parliament:

1. Malcolm McLean, Liberal (1925–1930)
2. Robert Weir, Conservative (1930–1935)
3. Malcolm McLean, Liberal (1935–1940)
4. Percy Ellis Wright, Co-operative Commonwealth Federation (1940–1953)

== Election results ==
Melfort elected members to the House of Commons of Canada from 1925 to 1949. The results of these elections were:

1925 Canadian federal election
Party	Candidate	Votes
Liberal	MCLEAN, Malcolm	3,688
Conservative	KEOWN, Herbert Elwood	2,646
Progressive	GREAVES, Rupert James	2,178

1926 Canadian federal election
Party	Candidate	Votes
Liberal	MCLEAN, Malcolm	7,270
Conservative	KEOWN, Herbert Elwood	4,306

1930 Canadian federal election
Party	Candidate	Votes
Conservative	WEIR, Robert	8,689
Liberal	MCLEAN, Malcolm	7,367
Farmer	DOYLE, Ferman E.	1,435

By-election: On Mr. Weir's acceptance of an office of emolument under the Crown, 8 August 1930

Canadian federal by-election, 25 August 1930
Party	Candidate	Votes
Conservative	WEIR, Hon. Robert	acclaimed

1935 Canadian federal election
Party	Candidate	Votes
Liberal	MCLEAN, Malcolm	6,389
Conservative	WEIR, Hon. Robert	4,814
Social Credit	LEWIS, Arthur John	4,721
Co-operative Commonwealth	POPE, Dorothy C.	2,977

1940 Canadian federal election
Party	Candidate	Votes
Co-operative Commonwealth	WRIGHT, Percy Ellis	11,358
Liberal	MCLEAN, Malcolm	8,019
New Democracy	HAVER, Malcolm James	1,732

1945 Canadian federal election
Party	Candidate	Votes
Co-operative Commonwealth	WRIGHT, Percy Ellis	9,849
Progressive Conservative	HOPE, Ernest Charles	5,793
Liberal	FRASER, Finlay Thomas	5,408

1949 Canadian federal election
Party	Candidate	Votes
Co-operative Commonwealth	WRIGHT, Percy Ellis	7,208
Liberal	MACNUTT, Thomas Russell	7,117
Progressive Conservative	CAMPBELL, Andrew McCallum	2,228

== See also ==
- List of Canadian electoral districts
- Historical federal electoral districts of Canada
