= James William Maddin =

Canadian politician

James William Maddin (September 8, 1874 – September 29, 1961) was a Canadian lawyer and political figure in Nova Scotia, Canada. He represented Cape Breton South in the House of Commons of Canada from 1908 to 1911 as a Liberal-Conservative member.

He was born in Westville, Nova Scotia, the son of William Maddin and Agnes Goode. Maddin was educated at Pictou Academy and Dalhousie University. In 1897, he married Maude MacDonald. He was defeated when he ran for reelection in 1911. Maddin served overseas during World War I, reaching the rank of major. After the war, Maddin practiced law in Springhill and Sydney. He died in Sydney at the age of 87.
