= Grand River, Nova Scotia =

Community in Nova Scotia, Canada

Coordinates: 45°39′2.33″N 60°39′39.95″W

Grand River in Nova Scotia

Grand River is a small town in the Canadian province of Nova Scotia, located in Richmond County. Its geographical coordinates are 45° 38' 0" North, 60° 40' 0" West Grand River has an estimated population of 200-300 people. The Local volunteer fire department, (est. 1973) has 20 members and put on a fundraising day every August called Grand river dayz. This consists of a poker run on the river, a duck race, and a pork chop BBQ.

== Points of interest ==
- Point Michaud Beach House
- Point Michaud Beach Provincial Park
- Salmon View Log Cabins
