= Co-operative Commonwealth Federation =

Canadian political party (1932–1961)

Co-operative Commonwealth Federation Fédération du Commonwealth Coopératif Parti social démocratique du Canada
- Chairman: J. S. Woodsworth; M. J. Coldwell; F. R. Scott; Percy Wright; David Lewis
- Secretary: M. J. Coldwell; David Lewis; Lorne Ingle; Carl Hamilton
- Founded: 1 August 1932
- Dissolved: 3 August 1961
- Preceded by: Ginger Group; Dominion Labor Party (Alberta); Independent Labour Party; United Farmers of Alberta (political wing)
- Succeeded by: New Democratic Party
- Headquarters: Ottawa, Ontario, Canada
- Think tank: League for Social Reconstruction
- Ideology: Co-operative commonwealth Democratic socialism Social democracy Social Gospel; Agrarianism
- Political position: Left-wing
- International affiliation: Socialist International
- Colours: Green; yellow

The Co-operative Commonwealth Federation (CCF; French: Fédération du Commonwealth Coopératif, FCC) was a federal democratic socialist and social-democratic political party in Canada. The CCF was founded in 1932 in Calgary, Alberta, by the merger of several socialist, agrarian, co-operative, and labour groups, and the League for Social Reconstruction. In 1944, the CCF formed one of the first social-democratic governments in North America when it was elected to form the provincial government in Saskatchewan.

The full, but little used, name of the party was Co-operative Commonwealth Federation (Farmer-Labour-Socialist).

In 1961, the CCF was succeeded by the New Democratic Party (NDP).

== Origins ==
The CCF aimed to alleviate the suffering that workers and farmers, the ill and the old endured under capitalism, seen most starkly during the Great Depression, through the creation of a co-operative commonwealth, which would entail economic co-operation, public ownership of the economy, and political reform.

The object of the political party as reported at its founding meeting in Calgary in 1932 was "the federation [joining] of organizations whose purpose is the establishment in Canada of a co-operative commonwealth, in which the basic principle of regulating production, distribution and exchange will be the supplying of human needs instead of the making of profit".

The goal of the CCF was defined as a "community freed from the domination of irresponsible financial and economic power in which all social means of production and distribution, including land, are socially owned and controlled either by voluntarily organized groups of producers and consumers or – in the case of major public services and utilities and such productive and distributive enterprises as can be conducted most efficiently when owned in common – by public corporations responsible to the people's elected representatives". Many of the party's first members of Parliament (MPs) were members of the Ginger Group, composed of United Farmers of Alberta, left-wing Progressive, and Labour MPs. These MPs included United Farmers of Alberta MPs William Irvine and Ted Garland, Agnes Macphail (United Farmers of Ontario), Humphrey Mitchell, Abraham Albert Heaps, Angus MacInnis, and Labour Party MP J. S. Woodsworth. Founding groups included the Independent Labour Party (of Manitoba), the Canadian Labour Party (mostly in Edmonton), the Dominion Labour Party of southern Alberta, the UFA, and the United Farmers of Ontario (which withdrew from the CCF in 1934).

Also involved in founding the new party were members of the League for Social Reconstruction (LSR), such as F. R. Scott and Frank Underhill. It can be said that the CCF was founded on May 26, 1932, when the Ginger Group MPs and LSR members met in William Irvine's office, the unofficial caucus meeting room for the Ginger Group, and went about forming the basis of the new party. J. S. Woodsworth was unanimously appointed the temporary leader until they could hold a founding convention. The temporary name for the new party was the Commonwealth Party. The Social Gospel was a significant influence on the CCF.

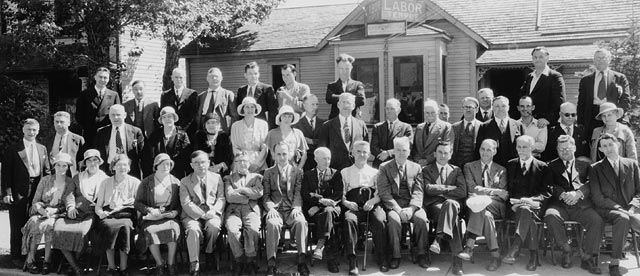
CCF founding meeting, Calgary, 1932

At its founding convention in 1932 in Calgary, the party settled on the name Co-operative Commonwealth Federation (Farmer-Labour-Socialist) and selected J. S. Woodsworth as party leader. Woodsworth had been an Independent Labour Party MP since 1921 and a member of the Ginger Group of MPs. The party's 1933 convention, held in Regina, Saskatchewan, adopted the Regina Manifesto as the party's program. The manifesto outlined a number of goals, including public ownership of key industries, universal public pensions, universal health care, children's allowances, unemployment insurance, and workers' compensation.

Its conclusion read, "No CCF Government will rest content until it has eradicated capitalism and put into operation the full programme of socialized planning which will lead to the establishment in Canada of the Co-operative Commonwealth." The party affiliated itself with the Socialist International.

== Electoral performance ==
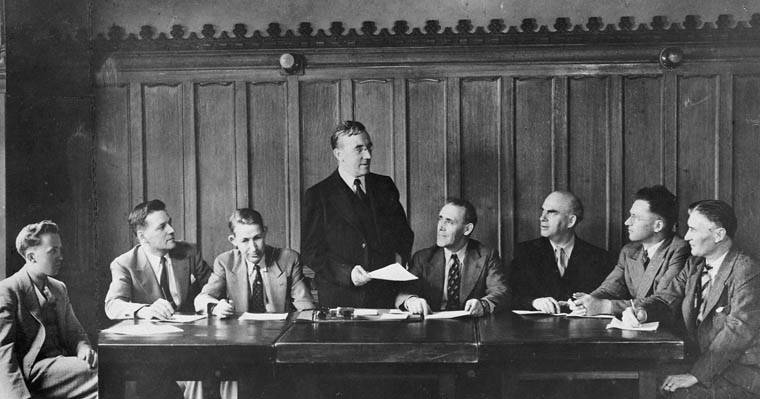
Federal CCF Caucus, in 1942 with new leader M.J. Coldwell. Left to right, Tommy Douglas, George Hugh Castleden, Angus MacInnis, Coldwell, Clarie Gillis, Joseph W. Noseworthy, Sandy Nicholoson, and Percy Wright.

In line with Alberta's important role in founding the CCF, it is said that the first CCF candidate elected was Chester Ronning in the Alberta provincial constituency of Camrose, in October 1932. The UFA, under whose banner he contested the election, formalized its already-strong connection to the CCF in its next provincial convention, in January 1933.

=== Federally ===
In its first federal election, seven CCF MPs were elected to the House of Commons in 1935. Eight were elected in the following election in 1940, including their first member east of Manitoba, Clarence Gillis, in Cape Breton, a coal-mining area of Nova Scotia (specifically the federal riding of Cape Breton South).

The party was divided with the outbreak of World War II: Woodsworth was a pacifist, while many party members supported the Canadian war effort. Woodsworth had a physically debilitating stroke in May 1940 and could no longer perform his duties as leader. In October, Woodsworth wrote a letter to the 1940 CCF convention, in essence asking to retire from the leadership. Instead, the delegates created the new position of Honorary President, abolished the President's position and re-elected M. J. Coldwell as the National Chairman. Coldwell was then appointed acting House Leader on 6 November. Woodsworth died on 21 March 1942, and Coldwell officially became the new leader at the July convention in Toronto and threw the party behind the war effort. As a memorial to Woodsworth, Coldwell suggested that the CCF create a research foundation, and Woodsworth House was established in Toronto for that purpose.

The party won a critical York South by-election on 8 February 1942, and in the process prevented the Conservative leader, former Prime Minister Arthur Meighen, from entering the House of Commons.

In the 1945 election, 28 CCF MPs were elected, and the party won 15.6% of the vote.

In the 1949 election, 13 CCF candidates were elected. This was followed by 23 elected in the 1953 election and a disappointing eight elected in the 1958 election. (In that election, the party took almost ten per cent of the vote so was due about 26 MPs proportionally.)

=== Provincially ===
The CCF party had its greatest success in provincial politics.

==== British Columbia ====
In the 1933 BC provincial election, the newly formed BC CCF received roughly thirty percent of the vote in the despite widespread fearmongering and redbaiting by opposing parties and elements in the media. This translated to roughly only 7 out of 48 seats. The Liberal party received approximately forty percent of the vote which translated to a majority of 34 seats.

The following election, in 1937, the party again won 7 seats, losing their seat in Victoria City and Mackenzie, but gaining seats in Comox and Cowichan-Newcastle.

In the 1941 election, the CCF doubled its seat share to 14 seats, leaving no party with a majority. This led to the BC Liberal Party and the Conservative Party of British Columbia forming a coalition government.

The party dropped down to 10 seats in the 1945 election, and down to 7 seats in the 1949 election, before rising back up to 18 seats in 1952 under the newly implemented preferential ballot system and with the voting age lowered to 19. This election also saw the surprising rise of the Social Credit Party of BC, who would dominate BC politics for the next 35 years. The CCF would remain the official opposition over this period, continuing on through the 1963 election where it would run under the banner of the BC NDP. In 1972, after 36 years as the official opposition, the BC NDP won 38 out of 55 seats, bringing the party to power for the first time in BC's history.

==== Ontario ====
In 1943, the Ontario CCF became the official opposition in that province.

==== Alberta ====
In 1944, the Alberta CCF took almost a quarter of all votes cast but due to lack of PR other than in the cities, won just two seats.

==== Saskatchewan ====
In 1944, the Saskatchewan CCF formed the first democratic socialist government in North America, with Tommy Douglas as premier. Douglas introduced universal Medicare to Saskatchewan, a policy that was soon adopted by other provinces and implemented nationally by the Liberal Party of Canada during the administration of Prime Minister Lester B. Pearson. Tommy Douglas's CCF governed Saskatchewan from 1944 to 1961.

== Transition to New Party and New Democratic Party ==
Federally, during the Cold War, the CCF was accused of having Communist leanings. The party moved to address these accusations in 1956 by replacing the Regina Manifesto with a more moderate document, the Winnipeg Declaration. Nevertheless, the party did poorly in the 1958 federal election, winning only eight seats.

After much discussion, the CCF and the Canadian Labour Congress decided to join forces to create a new political party that could make social democracy more popular with Canadian voters. This party, initially known as the New Party, became the New Democratic Party (NDP) in 1961.

== Electoral record ==
=== House of Commons ===
Election	Leader	Votes	%	Seats	+/–	Position	Status
1935	James Woodsworth	410,125	9.3	7 / 245	▲7	▲4th	Fourth party
1940	James Woodsworth	388,103	8.4	8 / 245	▲1	▲3rd	Fourth party
1945	Major James Coldwell	815,720	15.6	28 / 245	▲20	3rd	Third party
1949	Major James Coldwell	784,770	13.4	13 / 262	▼15	3rd	Third party
1953	Major James Coldwell	636,310	11.3	23 / 265	▲10	3rd	Third party
1957	Major James Coldwell	707,659	10.6	25 / 265	▲2	3rd	Third party
1958	Major James Coldwell	692,398	9.5	8 / 265	▼17	3rd	Third party

== Party structure ==
The CCF estimated its membership as being slightly more than 20,000 in 1938, less than 30,000 in 1942, and over 90,000 in 1944. Membership figures declined following World War II to only 20,238 in 1950 and would never again reach 30,000

By the late 1940s, the CCF had official or unofficial weekly newspapers in Alberta, British Columbia, and Saskatchewan; twice-monthly papers in Ontario and Manitoba; and a bimonthly in the Maritimes. A French-language paper in Quebec was also attempted at various times. The party also produced many educational books, pamphlets, and magazines, though these efforts declined in the 1950s.

=== Party leaders ===
Picture	Name	Term start	Term end	Riding as leader	Notes
	J. S. Woodsworth	1 August 1932	21 March 1942	Winnipeg North Centre, Winnipeg Centre, Manitoba	"Temporary leader" from the party's founding meeting on August 1, 1932, until the founding convention in July 1933 when he was elected president (leader) of the CCF. Due to illness, Woodsworth ceased to be parliamentary leader in October 1940. He remained honorary president (leader) of the CCF until his death.
	M. J. Coldwell	29 July 1942	10 August 1960	Rosetown—Biggar, Saskatchewan	Became parliamentary leader of the CCF in October 1940. Was unanimously elected party president (leader) at the CCF's national convention in Toronto in July 1942.
	Hazen Argue	11 August 1960	2 August 1961	Assiniboia, Wood Mountain, Saskatchewan	Chosen parliamentary leader by the CCF caucus after Coldwell lost his seat in the 1958 general election. Officially elected party leader, without opposition, at the CCF national convention in 1960.

=== National chairmen ===
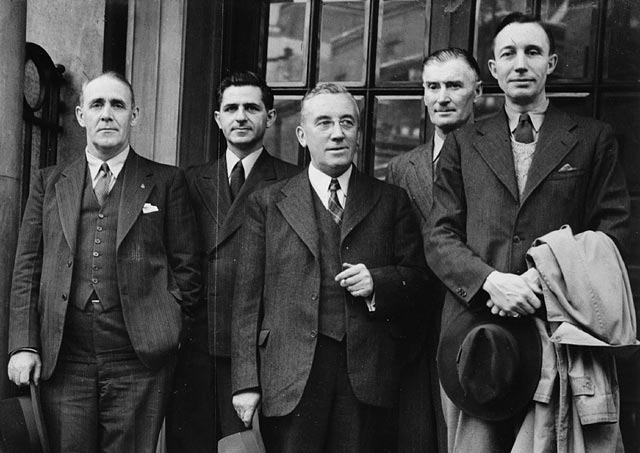
Four past and future national chairmen in September 1944: national CCF delegation attending the Conference of Commonwealth Labour Parties in London, England. Pictured from left to right: Clarie Gillis, MP for Cape Breton South; David Lewis, national secretary; M. J. Coldwell, national leader, MP for Rosetown—Biggar; Percy E. Wright, MP for Melfort; and F. R. Scott, national chairman.

The national chairman was the equivalent of party president in most Canadian political parties and was sometimes referred to as such, in that it was largely an organizational role. In the case of the CCF, the national chairman oversaw the party's national council and chaired its meetings. Following an initial period in which Woodsworth held both roles, it was usually distinct from and secondary to the position of party leader. National president originally was also a title the leader held, as both Woodsworth and Coldwell held the title when they held seats in the House of Commons. In 1958, after Coldwell lost his seat, the position of national chairman was merged formally into the president's title and was held by David Lewis.

- J. S. Woodsworth (1932–1938)
- M. J. Coldwell (1938–1942)
- F. R. Scott (1942–1950)
- Percy Wright (1950–1954)
- David Lewis (1954–1958)
- David Lewis as party president (1958–1961)

=== National secretaries ===
The national secretary was a staff position (initially part-time, and then full-time beginning 1938) which was responsible for the day-to-day organizing of the party. The national secretary was the only full-time employee at the party's national headquarters until 1943, when a research director, Eugene Forsey, and an assistant to the leader were hired.

- M. J. Coldwell (1934–1936)
- David Lewis (1936–1950)
- Lorne Ingle (1950–1958)
- Carl Hamilton (1958–1961)

== CCF song ==
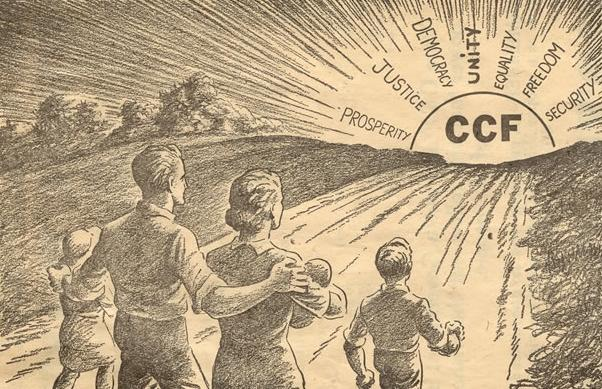
"Towards the Dawn!" – a 1930s promotional image from Saskatchewan

The CCF song would be later popularized by the movie Prairie Giant: The Tommy Douglas Story.

First verse:

A call goes out to Canada
It comes from out the soil—
Come and join the ranks through all the land
To fight for those who toil
Come on farmer, soldier, labourer,
From the mine and factory,
And side by side we'll swell the tide—
C.C.F. to Victory.

== Provincial sections ==
- Alberta CCF
- British Columbia CCF
- Manitoba CCF
- New Brunswick CCF
- Newfoundland CCF/Newfoundland Democratic Party
- Nova Scotia CCF
- Ontario CCF
- Prince Edward Island CCF
- Parti social démocratique du Québec (CCF in Quebec)
- Saskatchewan CCF

== See also ==
- List of articles about CCF/NDP members
- List of articles about British Columbia CCF/NDP members
- List of articles about Alberta CCF/NDP members
- List of articles about Saskatchewan CCF/NDP members
- List of articles about Manitoba CCF/NDP members
- List of articles about Ontario CCF/NDP members
- List of articles about Newfoundland and Labrador CCF/NDP members
- List of articles about Nova Scotia CCF/NDP members
- List of articles about Yukon NDP members
- Labour Party (Canada)
- New Democratic Party
- United Farmers
- Canadian Labour Congress
- Paper Wheat

Preceded by Ginger Group	Co-operative Commonwealth Federation; 1932–1961	Succeeded by New Democratic Party
