= William F. Carroll =

Canadian politician (1877–1964)

William Francis Carroll (June 11, 1877 – August 25, 1964) was a lawyer, judge, and political figure in Nova Scotia, Canada. He represented Cape Breton South from 1911 to 1917, Cape Breton South and Richmond from 1921 to 1925, and Inverness—Richmond from 1949 to 1953 in the House of Commons of Canada as a Liberal member.

He was born in Margaree Forks, Nova Scotia, the son of John Carroll, the son of an Irish immigrant, and Ellen Tompkins. Carroll was educated at Saint Francis Xavier University and Dalhousie University, was called to the Nova Scotia bar in 1905, and set up practice in Glace Bay. In 1906, he married Helen Curry. Carroll served as a lieutenant in the Canadian Expeditionary Force during World War I. He was defeated when he ran for re-election in 1917. In 1925, he was named to the Supreme Court of Nova Scotia; he was also named a judge of Admiralty in 1937. Carroll resigned from the bench in 1949 to run again federally. He died in Halifax at the age of 87.

His grandson John Murphy also served in the House of Commons.
