= Cape Breton South (federal electoral district) =

Former federal electoral district in Nova Scotia, Canada

Nova Scotia electoral district

Defunct federal electoral district
- Legislature: House of Commons
- District created: 1924
- District abolished: 1966
- First contested: 1925
- Last contested: 1965

Cape Breton South (French: Cap-Breton-Sud) was a federal electoral district in the province of Nova Scotia, Canada, that was represented by one MP in the House of Commons of Canada from 1904 to 1911 and from 1925 to 1968.

== History ==
This riding was created in 1903 from Cape Breton riding. It consisted of the southern part of the county of Cape Breton, i.e., the districts of Balls Creek Bateston, Big Pond, Bridgeport, Catalone, Dominion No. 1 and Reserve Mines, Fast Bay (South), Gabarus, Grand Mira, Hillside, Loch Lomond, Louisbourg, Main-à-Dieu, Port Morien, Sydney Forks, Trout Creek, Victoria Mines and Lingan, and the towns of Glace Bay, Louisbourg and Sydney.

It was abolished in 1914 when it was merged into Cape Breton South and Richmond.

It was created again in 1924 from Cape Breton South and Richmond. The new riding consisted of the part of the County of Cape Breton not included in the electoral district of Cape Breton North-Victoria and lying north of a line described as commencing in Mira Bay and following the Mira River and Mira Lake to Marion Bridge, the Mira Road to the Morley Road, the Morley Road to the main road between St. Peters and Sydney, that road to the road leading to East Bay and Gillisville, and that road to the waters of East Bay.

It 1933, it was redefined to consist of the part of the county of Cape Breton contained in the municipal districts of Dominion No. 6 (No. 11), Hillside (No. 3), Lingan (No. 20), Port-Morien (No. 12), Reserve Mines (No. 1) and South Forks (No. 18), and including the city of Sydney and the towns of Glace Bay, New Waterford and Dominion. In 1947, it was redefined to exclude Hillside and South Forks.

The electoral district was abolished in 1966 when it was redistributed into Cape Breton—East Richmond and Cape Breton—The Sydneys ridings.

== Members of Parliament ==
This riding elected the following members of Parliament:

Parliament	Years	Member	Party
Cape Breton South; Riding created from Cape Breton
10th	1904–1908	Alexander Johnston	Liberal
11th	1908–1911	James William Maddin	Liberal–Conservative
12th	1911–1917	William F. Carroll	Liberal
Riding dissolved into Cape Breton South and Richmond
Riding re-created from Cape Breton South and Richmond
15th	1925–1926	Finlay MacDonald	Conservative
16th	1926–1930	Finlay MacDonald	Conservative
17th	1930–1935	Finlay MacDonald	Conservative
18th	1935–1940	David James Hartigan	Liberal
19th	1940–1945	Clarence Gillis	Co-operative Commonwealth
20th	1945–1949	Clarence Gillis	Co-operative Commonwealth
21st	1949–1953	Clarence Gillis	Co-operative Commonwealth
22nd	1953–1957	Clarence Gillis	Co-operative Commonwealth
23rd	1957–1958	Donald MacInnis	Progressive Conservative
24th	1958–1962	Donald MacInnis	Progressive Conservative
25th	1962–1963	Malcolm MacInnis	New Democratic
26th	1963–1965	Donald MacInnis	Progressive Conservative
27th	1965–1968	Donald MacInnis	Progressive Conservative
Riding dissolved into Cape Breton—East Richmond and Cape Breton—The Sydneys

== Election results ==
=== Cape Breton South, 1904–1917 ===
1904 Canadian federal election
Party	Candidate	Votes
Liberal	Alexander Johnston	3,459
Conservative	William McKay	3,154
Labour	S.B. McNeil	869

1908 Canadian federal election
Party	Candidate	Votes
Liberal–Conservative	James William Maddin	5,048
Liberal	Alexander Johnston	4,823

1911 Canadian federal election
Party	Candidate	Votes
Liberal	William F. Carroll	5,069
Liberal	James William Maddin	4,965
Independent	Alexander McKinnon	223

=== Cape Breton South, 1925–1968 ===
1925 Canadian federal election
Party	Candidate	Votes
Conservative	Finlay MacDonald	9,551
Liberal	Laughlin Daniel Currie	4,510
Labour	J. B. McLachlan	3,617

1926 Canadian federal election
Party	Candidate	Votes
Conservative	Finlay MacDonald	8,924
Labour	Daniel W. Morrison	6,412

1930 Canadian federal election
Party	Candidate	Votes
Conservative	Finlay MacDonald	15,886
Liberal	Daniel Alexander Cameron	9,268

1935 Canadian federal election
Party	Candidate	Votes
Liberal	David James Hartigan	10,409
Conservative	Finlay MacDonald	7,355
Communist	J. B. McLachlan	5,365
Reconstruction	Dan William Morrison	5,008

1940 Canadian federal election
Party	Candidate	Votes
Co-operative Commonwealth	Clarence Gillis	11,582
Liberal	David James Hartigan	11,364
National Government	Joseph Clyde Nunn	9,719

1945 Canadian federal election
Party	Candidate	Votes
Co-operative Commonwealth	Clarence Gillis	16,575
Liberal	David James Hartigan	10,529
Progressive Conservative	Donald Joseph Buckley	7,343
Labor–Progressive	James Madden	917

1949 Canadian federal election
Party	Candidate	Votes
Co-operative Commonwealth	Clarence Gillis	15,057
Liberal	George Benjamin Slaven	12,608
Progressive Conservative	Perry Lewis Cadegan	5,618

1953 Canadian federal election
Party	Candidate	Votes
Co-operative Commonwealth	Clarence Gillis	14,971
Liberal	Leo McIntyre	10,151
Progressive Conservative	Layton Fergusson	4,726
Labor–Progressive	Ronald George MacEachern	794

1957 Canadian federal election
Party	Candidate	Votes
Progressive Conservative	Donald MacInnis	14,894
Liberal	Leo McIntyre	11,539
Co-operative Commonwealth	Clarence Gillis	10,447

1958 Canadian federal election
Party	Candidate	Votes
Progressive Conservative	Donald MacInnis	17,636
Co-operative Commonwealth	Clarence Gillis	13,044
Liberal	J. Louis Dubinsky	7,754

1962 Canadian federal election
Party	Candidate	Votes
New Democratic	Malcolm Vic MacInnis	17,409
Progressive Conservative	Donald MacInnis	13,602
Liberal	Earl V. MacInnis	7,774

1963 Canadian federal election
Party	Candidate	Votes
Progressive Conservative	Donald MacInnis	14,307
New Democratic	Malcolm Vic MacInnis	13,327
Liberal	Joe MacEachern	9,184

1965 Canadian federal election
Party	Candidate	Votes
Progressive Conservative	Donald MacInnis	13,670
Liberal	Joseph E. MacEachern	12,455
New Democratic	Ed Johnston	10,846

== See also ==
- List of Canadian electoral districts
- Historical federal electoral districts of Canada
