= By-elections to the 15th Canadian Parliament =

By-elections to the 15th Canadian Parliament were held to elect members of the House of Commons of Canada between the 1925 federal election and the 1926 federal election. Initially the Liberal Party of Canada and the Progressive Party of Canada formed a coalition government for the 15th Canadian Parliament, following the King–Byng Affair the Conservative Party of Canada was given a minority government, which dissolved quickly.

The list includes a Ministerial by-election which occurred due to the requirement that Members of Parliament recontest their seats upon being appointed to Cabinet. These by-elections were almost always uncontested. This requirement was abolished in 1931.

By-election	Date	Incumbent	Party	Winner	Party	Cause	Retained
Middlesex West	March 29, 1926	John Campbell Elliott	Liberal	John Campbell Elliott	Liberal	Recontested upon appointment as Minister of Labour	Yes
Regina	March 16, 1926	Francis Nicholson Darke	Liberal	Charles Avery Dunning	Liberal	Resignation to provide a seat for Dunning	Yes
Prince Albert	February 15, 1926	Charles McDonald	Liberal	William Lyon Mackenzie King	Liberal	Resignation to provide a seat for Mackenzie King	Yes
Bagot	December 7, 1925	Joseph Edmond Marcile	Liberal	Georges Dorèze Morin	Liberal	Death	Yes

== Sources ==
- Parliament of Canada–Elected in By-Elections

== See also ==
- List of federal by-elections in Canada
