= February 1926 =

Month of 1926

<<	February 1926					>>
Su	Mo	Tu	We	Th	Fr	Sa
	1	2	3	4	5	6
7	8	9	10	11	12	13
14	15	16	17	18	19	20
21	22	23	24	25	26	27
28

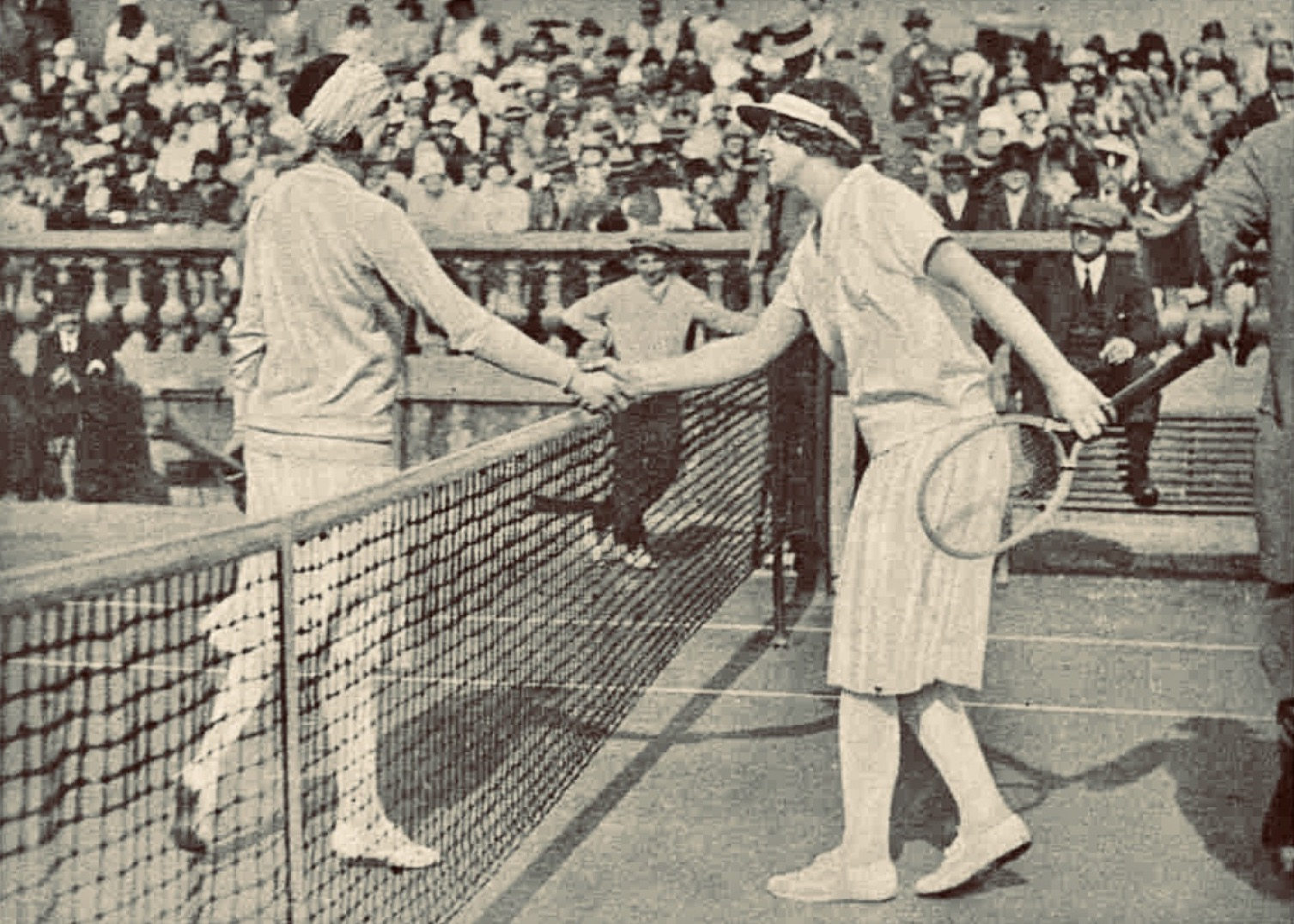
Tennis champions Suzanne Lenglin (left) and Helen Wills (right) face off in the "Match of the Century"

The following events occurred in February 1926:

== February 1, 1926 (Monday) ==
- The Kirghiz Autonomous Socialist Republic, a forerunner of what is now the Kyrgyz Republic, was created for the Kyrgyz people in the USSR, initially as a unit within the Russian SFSR within the Soviet Union. In 1936, it would be elevated to the status of Kirghiz Soviet Socialist Republic, one of 15 SSRs at the time of the breakup of the Soviet Union.
- The John Colton play The Shanghai Gesture opened on Broadway.
- Died: Anna Kriebel Vanzo, 64, Norwegian operatic soprano

== February 2, 1926 (Tuesday) ==
- A play, adapted from F. Scott Fitzgerald's 1925 novel The Great Gatsby, premiered at the Ambassador Theater on Broadway. Produced by William A. Brady from a script written by Owen Davis, and directed by George Cukor, the first theater Gatsby production starred James Rennie as the title character and Florence Eldridge as Daisy.
- Representatives of the governments of Britain and France signed a treaty of friendship on behalf of the British Mandate for Palestine and the French Mandate for Syria and the Lebanon.
- In Germany, four members of the illegal Black Reichswehr paramilitary organization were sentenced to death for politically motivated murders. State authorities had the court proceedings carried out under a veil of secrecy to "insure the safety of the state."
- Baseball's National League held a banquet at the Hotel Astor in New York to celebrate its 50th anniversary .
- Born:
  - Valéry Giscard d'Estaing, 20th President of France from 1974 to 1981; in Koblenz, Germany, where his father was stationed during the occupation of the Rhineland (d. 2020)
  - Nydia Ecury, Aruban translator dedicated to preserving the Papiamento dialect, a Portuguese-based creole language spoken on the former Dutch Caribbean islands of Aruba, Bonaire and Curacao; in Rancho, Aruba (d. 2012)
- Died:
  - Vladimir Sukhomlinov, 77, the former Minister of War for the Russian Empire from 1909 to 1915, was found frozen to death on a park bench in Berlin, where he had gone into exile after the Russian Revolution of 1917.
  - William Wood, 68, American textile mill owner, committed suicide by shooting himself near Daytona Beach, Florida, after asking his chauffeur and his valet to take him to "a lonely spot above Flagler Beach."

== February 3, 1926 (Wednesday) ==
- By a decree of the Czechoslovakia's Prime Minister Thomas Masaryk, issued in accordance with the nation's Minorities Act, the Czech language became the government's official language, and all public officials and judges— not only those who used the Slovak language, but those in regions where German or Hungarian were the most common languages— were required to pass a test showing their fluency in Czech. "As a consequence," a historian would later note, "the civil service was depleted of German and Magyar officials, and dismissals did not spare even the most menial occupation. The replacements were Czech and, rarely, Slovak."
- An explosion killed 20 coal miners at the Pittsburgh Terminal Coal Company's No. 15 mine in Horning, Pennsylvania.

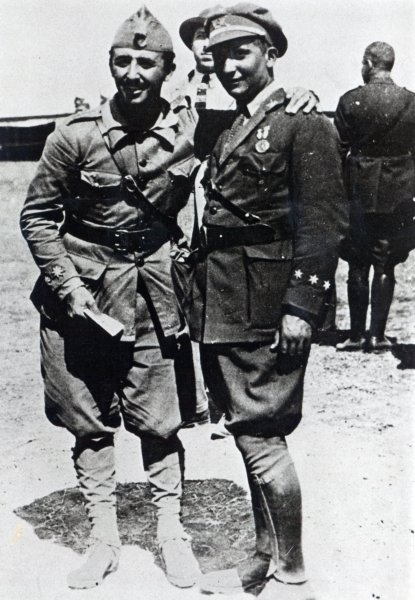
General Francisco Franco (left) with his brother Ramón

- Spanish Army Colonel and future dictator of Spain Francisco Franco was promoted to the rank of Brigadier General at the age of 33, becoming the youngest general in Europe
- Born:
  - Hans-Jochen Vogel, German politician who was Chairman of the Social Democratic Party of Germany (Sozialdemokratische Partei Deutschlands or SPD) from 1987 to 1991 during the period of Germany's reunification; in Göttingen, Free State of Prussia (d. 2020)
  - Glen Tetley, American ballet choreographer; in Cleveland (d. 2007)
  - Robert McGinnis, American illustrator known for designing cinema posters for major films, and covers for paperback books; in Cincinnati (d. 2025)
- Died: T. W. Ward, 72, founder of Britain's Thos W Ward Ltd. scrap metal company

== February 4, 1926 (Thursday) ==
- A $250 million, five-year plan to upgrade the United States Naval Air Force was submitted to the House Committee on Naval Affairs. The plan called to nearly double the number of Navy planes from 638 to 1,248 by the end of 1931.
- Born: Dave Sands, Australian boxer who was the Australian heavyweight champion at the time of his death, and is one of the few people inducted into the World Boxing Hall of Fame despite never having held a world title; in Kempsey, New South Wales (killed in a truck accident, 1952)
- Died: Mehmed Atıf Hoca, 51, Turkish Islamic philosopher and teacher, was hanged for violating Turkey's Hat Law.

== February 5, 1926 (Friday) ==
- Terrorists attacked a train that was traveling the railway from Moscow to Riga, with an ultimate destination of Berlin, specifically targeting a group of Soviet Foreign Ministry employees. After the train crossed the border out of the Soviet Union and into the Republic of Latvia, two armed men stopped the train between Ikšķile and Koknese to attack Soviet couriers L. F. Pecherskiy, Theodor Nette and his partner, with the apparent goal of stealing a diplomatic pouch. Two men, Antonijs Gabrilovich and Bronisławs Gabrilovich invaded the train compartment while carrying guns. Nette shot and wounded one gunman before being shot in the head, and Mahmastal, though wounded, stayed behind to guard the pouch while Pecherskiy escaped. As of 2017, the date of Nette's death is observed on February 5 in Ikšķile by employees of the Russian Embassy in Latvia as part of the "All-Russian Day of Remembrance of Diplomatic Couriers Who Died in the Line of Duty".
- A crowd of 10,000 people packed the streets of Los Angeles to watch the funeral procession of actress Barbara La Marr, who had died on January 30 at the age of 29. Numerous injuries were reported as onlookers, mostly women, rushed forward to get a view of the silver coffin.
- Born:
  - Arthur Ochs Sulzberger, American publisher of The New York Times from 1963 to 1992 and chairman of its board of directors from 1973 to 1997; in Southampton, New York (d. 2012)
  - Seiichi Miyake, Japanese engineer and inventor known for his invention of tactile paving, textured surfaces for roadsides, stairs and railway platforms to aid people with a visual impairment; in Kurashiki, Okayama Prefecture (died of chronic hepatitis, 1982).
- Died: Carl Hau, German lawyer and convicted murderer who published two books about his 1907 crime after his parole in 1924, shot himself in the head while awaiting an appeal of his conviction for violating his probation.

== February 6, 1926 (Saturday) ==
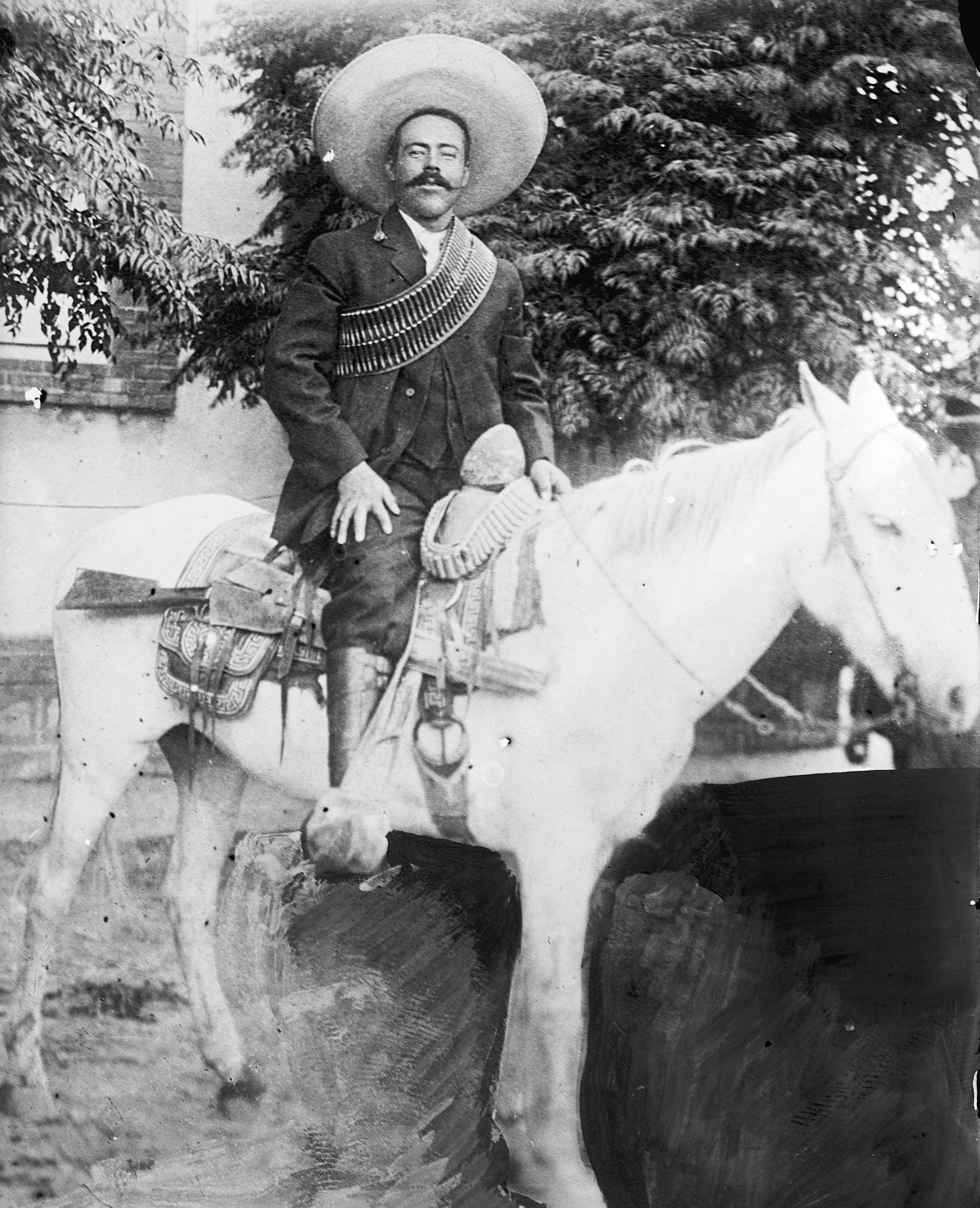
Pancho Villa

- An unknown party raided the grave of Pancho Villa and stole the Mexican revolutionary leader's skull. The fate of the skull is a mystery and the source of multiple legends, with one holding that it is in the Skull and Bones Crypt at Yale University.
- Italy's Premier Benito Mussolini made a defiant speech to his cabinet on the issue of the Italianization of South Tyrol. Responding to protests from Germany about the oppression of Tyrolean Germans, Mussolini vowed that the policy would "not change by a centimeter" and declared, "We will make this territory Italian because it is Italian geographically and historically." He warned, "If the Germans attempt a boycott, we will answer with boycotts squared. If Germany takes reprisals, we will answer with reprisals cubed."
- In an intersectional match between two of the best college basketball teams in the 1925–26 NCAA men's basketball season, unbeaten (12-0) Syracuse University hosted the once-beaten (6-1) Michigan Wolverines, 36 to 33. Syracuse, which finished the season with 15 wins and 1 loss, would retroactively be declared the season's national champion by the Helms Foundation, a finding recognized by the NCAA record.
- Born: Alice Putnam Willetts, American field hockey and lacrosse player and coach, player on the U.S. national women's field hockey team from 1946 to 1955, and one of the first inductees to the USA Field Hockey Hall of Fame; in Ridley, Pennsylvania (d. 2020)
- Died: Carrie Clark Ward, 64, American stage and silent film actress

== February 7, 1926 (Sunday) ==
- The Italian army seized Jaghbub, the Libyan desert oasis village and home of the Senussi Movement. The column of 2,000 troops met with no resistance.

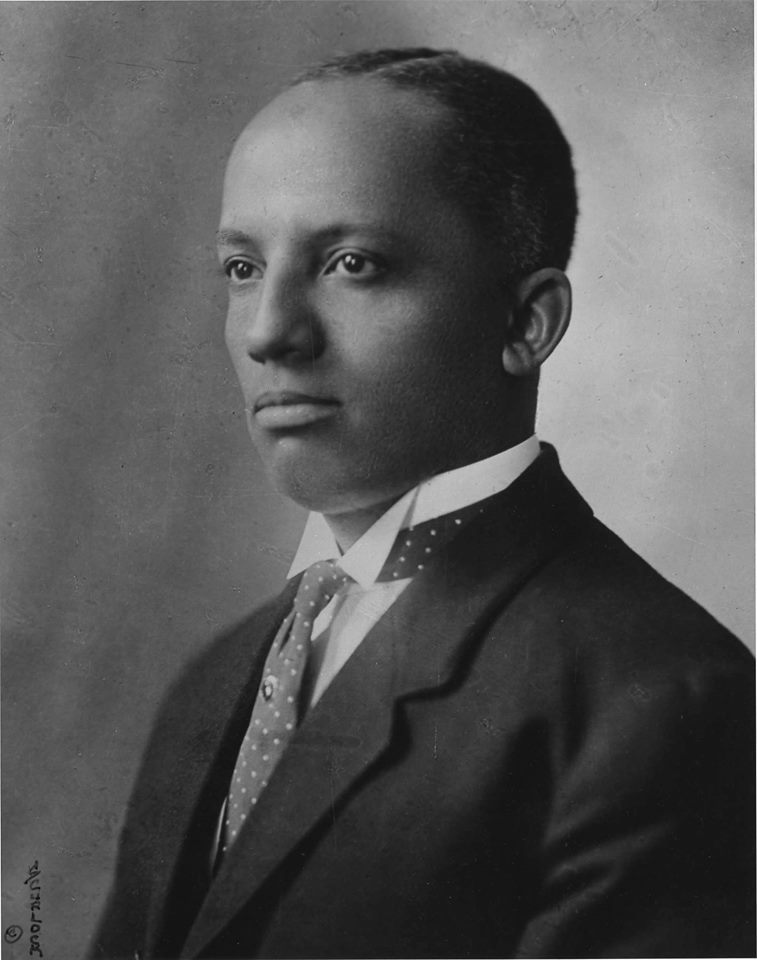
Woodson

- African-American historian Carter G. Woodson initiated "Negro History Week", the precursor of Black History Month.
- At the World Speed Skating Championship held in Canada on Lily Lake in New Brunswick, Charles Gorman broke the world record for the 220 and 440 yard events.
- Born:
  - Konstantin Feoktistov, Russian cosmonaut who orbited the Earth on flew on the Voskhod 1 mission in 1964; in Voronezh, Russian SFSR, Soviet Union (d. 2009)
  - John Frank Davidson, British chemical engineer known as "the founding father of fluidization in chemical engineering".; in Newcastle upon Tyne, Tyneside (d. 2019)

== February 8, 1926 (Monday) ==
- Seán O'Casey's The Plough and the Stars opened at the Abbey Theatre in Dublin and upset members of the audience sufficiently to lead to angry protests inside the theatre and riots outside.
- Torrent, the first American film to star Greta Garbo, premiered at the Capitol Theatre in New York City, ahead of a general release on February 21.
- The British—Irish border agreement, defining the border between the Irish Free State (now the Republic of Ireland) and the United Kingdom of Great Britain and Northern Ireland as 499 km (310 mi) from Lough Foyle in the north-west of Ireland to Carlingford Lough became recognized official in international law upon its filing with the League of Nations.
- In Stockholm, Sweden, Herma Szabo of Austria won the Ladies Competition of the World Figure Skating Championships for the fifth consecutive year.
- Born:
  - Tony Street, Australian politician and Minister for Foreign Affairs from 1980 to 1983 during the Fraser government; in Melbourne (d. 2022)
  - Neal Cassady, American writer; in Salt Lake City, Utah (died after being struck by train, 1968)
  - Francis McWilliams, Scotland-born British politician and Lord Mayor of London from 1992 to 1993; in Portobello, near Edinburgh (d. 2022)
  - Elizabeth Hoffman, American character actress best known for her regular role on the NBC TV series Sisters from 1991 to 1997; in Corvallis, Oregon (d. 2023)
- Died: William Bateson, 64, English geneticist

== February 9, 1926 (Tuesday) ==
- Prince Faisal, son of the Sultan of Nejd and King of Hejaz, Ibn Saud, took office as the Viceroy of Hejaz, the Governor-General of the recently conquered Kingdom of Hejaz, and the highest ranking resident of the King. He would continue until the 1932 unification of the dual monarchy into the Kingdom of Saudi Arabia.
- Flooding hit London suburbs after 18 consecutive days of rain raised the level of the River Lea, "causing scenes without parallel in London." Homes in Leyton, Tottenham, Chingford and Walthamstow were threatened by water as high as 14 feet (4.3 m).
- The Reichstag passed a declaration responding to Mussolini's speech of February 6, stating that Germany "vigorously rejects the Italian prime minister's objectively unjustifiable and insultingly phrased attacks and sneers." It went on to say, "Although the German people desire nothing more than to promote their own restoration in peaceful coöperation with other peoples, they will not permit themselves to be hindered from demanding the just treatment of German minorities under foreign sovereignty."

Born:

  - La Norma (stage name for Norma Fox), Danish-born aerialist and trapeze artist; in Randers (d. 2026)
  - Josip Vrhovec, Croatian and Yugoslav government official who served as Yugoslavia's Foreign Affairs Minister of Yugoslavia from 1978 to 1982; in Zagreb, Kingdom of Serbs, Croats, and Slovenes (d. 2006)

== February 10, 1926 (Wednesday) ==
- Germany formally applied to join the League of Nations, and a special session of the League Council was scheduled for February 12.
- The war of words between Germany and Italy continued, as Mussolini warned the League of Nations to stay out of the South Tyrol dispute and reaffirmed that Italy would "not accept any discussion of this matter by any assembly or council." Germany responded that it considered the matter closed until such time as it could be addressed by the League.
- Gdynia gained city rights in Poland.
- Born:
  - Bernard Lewis, English businessman who founded the River Island fashion clothing chain of stores and one of the 100 wealthiest people in the UK; as Bernard Pokrasse in Finsbury Park (d. 2026)
  - Danny Blanchflower, Northern Irish footballer; in Belfast (d. 1993)

== February 11, 1926 (Thursday) ==
- The government of Mexico's President Plutarco Elías Calles nationalized all property of the Roman Catholic church in Mexico.
- The Alianza Republicana, was formed in Spain by four political parties (the Partido Republicano Radical, the Partido Republicano Democrático Federal, the Republican Action Group, predecessor of Republican Action, and the Partit Republicà Català) united in their opposition to the dictatorship of Primo de Rivera and to the Spanish monarchy. The alliance would survive until the founding of the Second Spanish Republic in 1931.
- Born:
  - Leslie Nielsen, Canadian-born American actor and comedian, known for establishing himself as a dramatic film and TV actor in 1956 with Forbidden Planet before a breakthrough role in 1980 as a comedian in Airplane!; in Regina, Saskatchewan (d. 2010)
  - Paul Bocuse, French chef known for being prominent in nouvelle cuisine and for his cookbooks; in Collonges-au-Mont-d'Or, Rhône département (d. 2018)
  - Alexander Gibson, Scottish conductor who created the Scottish Opera in 1962; in Motherwell, Lanarkshire (d. 1995)
  - Seymour Lawrence, American publisher; in New York City (d. 1994)
- Died: Wilhelm Kuhnert. 60, German painter and illustrator specializing in paintings of African animals

== February 12, 1926 (Friday) ==
- The longest coal mine strike in U.S. history was settled after 165 days, in a contract signed at the Bellevue-Stratford hotel in Philadelphia between John L. Lewis of the United Mine Workers of America, on behalf of striking anthracite coal and Samuel D. Warriner on behalf of the anthracite coal companies.
- Ireland's Minister for Justice, Kevin O'Higgins, appointed members of the Committee on Evil Literature.
- Born:
  - Joe Garagiola, American baseball player and sportscaster; in St. Louis, Missouri (d. 2016)
  - Irene Camber, Italian fencer and Olympic gold medalist who won the women's foil individual competition at the 1952 Games in Helsinki, and the 1953 world championship in Brussels; in Trieste (d. 2024)
- Died: Francis Richter, 72, American publisher who founded the popular weekly sports magazine Sporting Life in 1883 and served as its chief editor until it ceased publication in 1924

== February 13, 1926 (Saturday) ==
- The Calles government ordered all Catholic schools in Mexico to close.
- The popular Chinese film Lonely Orchid (Kōnggǔ lán), starring Zhang Zhiyun and Yang Naimei, and directed by Zhang Shichuan premiered, starting with the Palace Theatre in Shanghai at the start of the Guo Nian celebrations of the Chinese New Year.
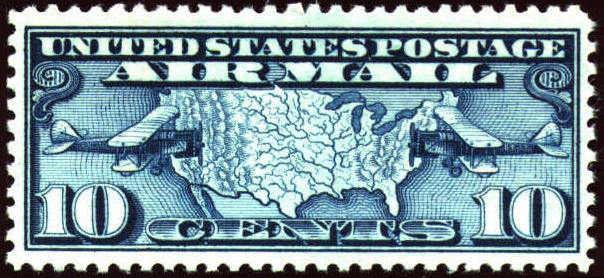
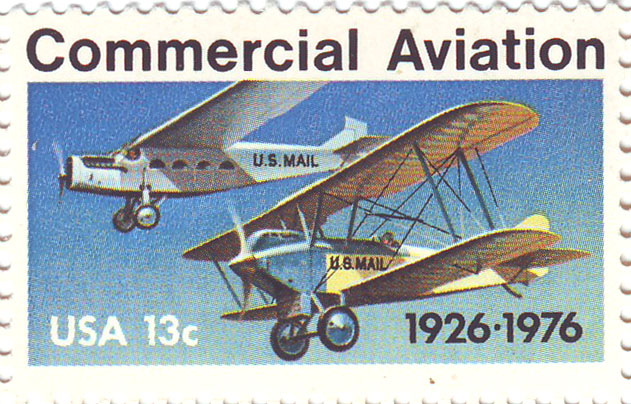
The original 1926 Air Mail stamp and the 1976 commemorative stamp
- The first U.S. Air Mail stamp specifically limited for air mail use was issued by the U.S. Department of the Post Office in accordance with the Air Mail Act of 1925.
- Born:
  - Henry B. R. Brown, American financial consultant who created (in 1970) the world's first money market fund, the Reserve Fund, along with Bruce R. Bent; (d. 2008) in Pittsburgh
  - Robert W. Clower, American economist who created the stock and flow analysis for economic statistical measurement; in Pullman, Washington (d. 2011)
- Died: Henry Holt, 86, American book publisher and author, known for founding Henry Holt and Company in 1866

== February 14, 1926 (Sunday) ==
- Germany's Nazi Party held the Bamberg Conference, where the Party approved a motion by Adolf Hitler to establish his position as the sole, absolute and unquestioned ultimate authority within the party under the doctrine of Führerprinzip, whose decisions are final and non-appealable, and to confirm the 1920 25-Punkte-Programm as immutable.
- In the state of Victoria in Australia, fast-moving bushfires killed 31 people in and near Warburton Powelltown, and left 2,000 others homeless on what would become referred to in the state as "Black Sunday".
- Miguel Abadía Méndez was officially elected as the 12th President of Colombia with minimal opposition as the only major candidate. Abadía received 370,494 votes and all other candidates got a combined 432 votes.
- Willy Böckl of Austria won the men's singles title of the World Figure Skating Championships in Berlin.
- Ramchandra Deva IV became the Gajapati, ruler, of the princely state of Jagannath Puri in British India upon the death of his adoptive father, the Gajapati Mukundeva Deva III.
- Born:
  - Sir John Methven, British barrister who served as the Director General of the Confederation of British Industry from 1976 to his death in 1980
  - Al Brodax, American TV and cartoon producer; in Brooklyn, New York (d. 2016)
- Died:
  - John Jacob Bausch, 95, German-born American maker of optical instruments and co-founder with Henry Lomb of the Bausch & Lomb company.
  - Charles Hoskins, 74, English-born Australian industrialist and co-founder of the G & C Hoskins pipe manufacturing company

== February 15, 1926 (Monday) ==
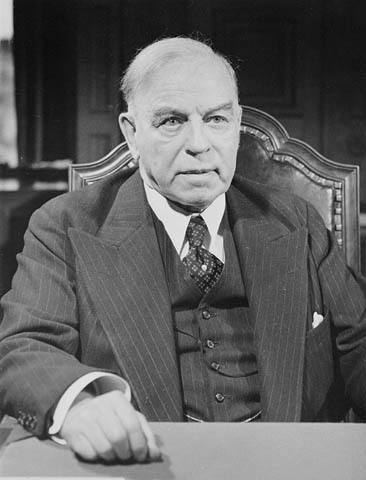
PM King elected as an MP

- Canadian Prime Minister William Lyon Mackenzie King won a by-election for the representative for Prince Albert, Saskatchewan district, ending the unusual situation of a Prime Minister governing without his own seat in the Parliament. Charles McDonald, who had won the Prince Albert seat in the 1925 election, had resigned on January 15 in order for King to run in a district that favored Liberal Party candidates, and King had no opposition.
- In the U.S., the task of delivery of air mail was contracted out to private companies after being performed for eight years by the U.S. government, and two different Contract Air Mail route flights were carried out by Ford Air Transport, a subsidiary of the Ford Motor Company. Lawrence G. Fritz made the first flight, departing in a Stout 2-AT Pullman airplane from the Ford Airport near Detroit and landed in Cleveland for the initial delivery.
- Jia Deyao was installed as the acting Premier of the Republic of China, succeeding Xu Shiying, who had resigned suddenly.
- The Orpheum Theatre opened in Los Angeles.
- On the same day, Broadway's Mansfield Theatre (now the Lena Horne Theatre) opened in New York City.

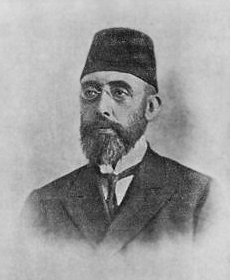
Mehmed Celal Bey

- Died:
  - Mehmet Celal Bey, 62, Turkish Ottoman administrator who declined to carry out orders during the Armenian genocide, particularly defying the Ottoman deportation orders while serving as a provincial government.
  - Thomas Burk, 85, U.S. Civil War veteran and Medal of Honor recipient

== February 16, 1926 (Tuesday) ==
- The two best women's tennis players in the world, Suzanne Lenglen of France and Helen Wills of the U.S., faced each other at Cannes in an event billed as "The Match of the Century". At the time, Lenglen was the reigning 1925 champion of the French Open and of Wimbledon (which she had won six times since 1919), and ranked as the number one women's player in the world, while Wills was the 1925 U.S. Open champion, her third consecutive crown. In their only match against each other during their careers, with the format of the best two of three sets, Lenglen won the first set, 6 to 3. In the second Wills had a 5 to 4 lead over Lenglen, and was even congratulated by Lenglen on a shot that appeared to have won the set and would have forced a third match. Instead, linesman Charles Hope ruled that Wills had not won, and play continued. In extra sets, Lenglen came back to win, 8 games to 6 and took both the set and the match.
- Born:
  - John Schlesinger, English-born American film director, winner of the 1969 Academy Award for Best Director for Midnight Cowboy; in Hampton, London (d. 2003)
  - Jean Patchett, American fashion model; in Preston, Maryland (d.2002)
  - Rayene "Ray" Simpson, Australian soldier and recipient of the Victoria Cross for his heroism during the Vietnam War; at Redfern, New South Wales (died of cancer, 1978)
  - Margot Frank, German-born Dutch older sister of Anne Frank and concentration camp victim; in Frankfurt (d. 1945)
- Died: George West, American cattle rancher and founder of the town of George West, Texas; in Bath Springs, Tennessee

== February 17, 1926 (Wednesday) ==
- The Grand National Assembly of Turkey approved the Turkish Civil Code (Türk Kanunu Medenisi), a secular set of rules to replace the Muslim Sharia code except for religious matters. The new code, intended to modernize law in the same manner as the Swiss Civil Code to provide civil rights to the nation's women, acknowledging their entitlement to have the same rights as men. Among other things, women were given the right to choose any profession, civil marriage was made compulsory, and polygamy was banned, but would not be granted the right to vote until 1934.
- In the U.S., an avalanche in Utah's Bingham Canyon killed 79 men, women and children in the copper mining town of Highland Boy.
- In the harbor of Port of Spain in Trinidad and Tobago, the Trinidadian steamer Naparima sank after colliding with an ocean liner, the Vandyck of the Lamport and Holt Line. Eleven passengers and crew on the Naparima drowned, while the remainder were rescued by fishing boats.
- In soccer football, the national team of Colombia (which would go on to appear in six FIFA World Cup tournaments, played its first international game, defeating Costa Rica, 4 to 1, in Barranquilla.
- Born:
  - John Meyendorff, French orthodox theologian; in Neuilly-sur-Seine, Hauts-de-Seine département (d. 1992)
  - Friedrich Cerha, Austrian opera composer; in Vienna (d.2023)

== February 18, 1926 (Thursday) ==
- In Greece, President Theodoros Pangalos carried out the arrest and deportation of 15 opposition leaders, including former premier Alexandros Papanastasiou and former Interior Minister Georgios Kondylis. Papanastasio and the others were deported to the island of Anafi, the most remote of the Cyclades islands in the Aegean Sea. Pangalos ordered that "all firearms, except those used for sport", such as hunting rifles, were to be delivered to police authorities by March 30 after which police would have the right to search for and confiscate firearms.
- Ayn Rand arrived in the United States.
- At Slough in England, the French auto manufacturer Citroën opened what would become "the largest factory under one roof in Britain", with 500,000 square feet of workshops that would eventually produce 200 cars per day. Chairman Andre Citroën said in a speech that he hoped that the combination of French engineers and British workmen would work well, and that vehicles would range in price from $775 to $1,225.
- Born: Len Ford, American football player and Pro Football Hall of Fame enshrinee; in Washington, D.C. (d. 1972)

== February 19, 1926 (Friday) ==
- The Soviet Union became the first nation to establish diplomatic relations with what is now the Kingdom of Saudi Arabia, at the time called the Kingdom of Hejaz and Nejd, as the Soviet Muslim Karim Khakimov drove from Jiddah to the residence of King Ibn Saud to deliver the formal note of recognition by Moscow of the King as ruler of Hejaz.
- The Olympia Theatre opened in Miami, Florida.
- Born:
  - György Kurtág, Romanian-born Hungarian classical music composer; in Lugoj (alive in 2026)
  - Michael Kennedy, English music critic and biographer; in Manchester (d. 2014)
  - Bai Jinian, Chinese Communist Party official who, in 1984, became the first provincial party chief to be elected by secret ballot with multiple choices, and served as the Party Secretary of Shaanxi Province until being removed by the national chairman in 1987; in Suide, Shaanxi Province (d. 2015)

== February 20, 1926 (Saturday) ==
- American Serial killer Earle Nelson committed his first of at least 22 murders, when inquiring at the boarding house of wealthy landlady, 60-year-old Clara Newman, in San Francisco. After entering her home on the pretext of agreeing to rent a room, Nelson strangled Miss Newman, raped her dead body and then hid it in a vacant apartment, and departed to find another elderly woman. He continued his killing spree for more than 15 months before being arrested in Canada.
- Arrests and deportations continued in Greece as 14 members of the opposition, including former Justice Minister and Prime Minister Georgios Kafantaris, were picked up by police and then sent into exile to the island of Santorin.
- Born:
  - Whitney Blake, American actress; in Eagle Rock, Los Angeles (d. 2002)
  - Richard Matheson, American writer; in Allendale, New Jersey (d. 2013)
  - Bob Richards, U.S. track and field athlete; in Champaign, Illinois (d. 2023)

== February 21, 1926 (Sunday) ==
- A pastoral letter read in all the Catholic churches in Austria condemned the "cult of the body" in present-day gymnastics, denouncing mixed bathing, rhythmic dancing and immodest sports attire as "un-Christian."
- Swedish film actress Greta Garbo was seen in a U.S. film for the first time as Irving Thalberg's romance and disaster silent film Torrent (also starring Ricardo Cortez premiered. At the time, Garbo was unable to speak English.
- Died:
  - Heike Kamerlingh Onnes, 72, Dutch physicist who received the 1913 Nobel Prize in Physics for his discovery of the principle of superconductivity in 1911
  - Walter Herries Pollock, 76, English journalist and editor (from 1884 to 1894) of the London weekly newspaper The Saturday Review of Politics, Literature, Science, and Art

== February 22, 1926 (Monday) ==
- A group of 20,000 fans packed the Fulford-Miami Speedway to witness the first race at the world's fastest speedway, won by Pete DePaolo. It was the only race ever held at the speedway, as it was destroyed in the Great Miami Hurricane later that year and never rebuilt.
- A letter dispatched from Pope Pius XI to the Italian government said that he would not recognize any church reform laws that it passed until an accord was reached, which could not happen as long as the Roman Question remained unsettled.
- The 33-member House of Representatives of Annam was established in Huế (now in Vietnam) as an advisory body by decree of the French Governor-General of Indochina Alexandre Varenne. Huỳnh Thúc Kháng, later the president of North Vietnam, was elected as the chamber's first president.
- Born:
  - Kenneth Williams, English film actor known for the Carry On series of comedies; in Islington, London (d. 1988)
  - Marcy McGuire, American film musical actress known for Sing Your Way Home and Summer Magic; in Kansas City, Kansas (d. 2021)
  - Alan "Bud" Yorkin, American TV producer known for the hit situation comedies All in the Family, Maude, Good Times, and Sanford and Son; (d. 2015)

== February 23, 1926 (Tuesday) ==
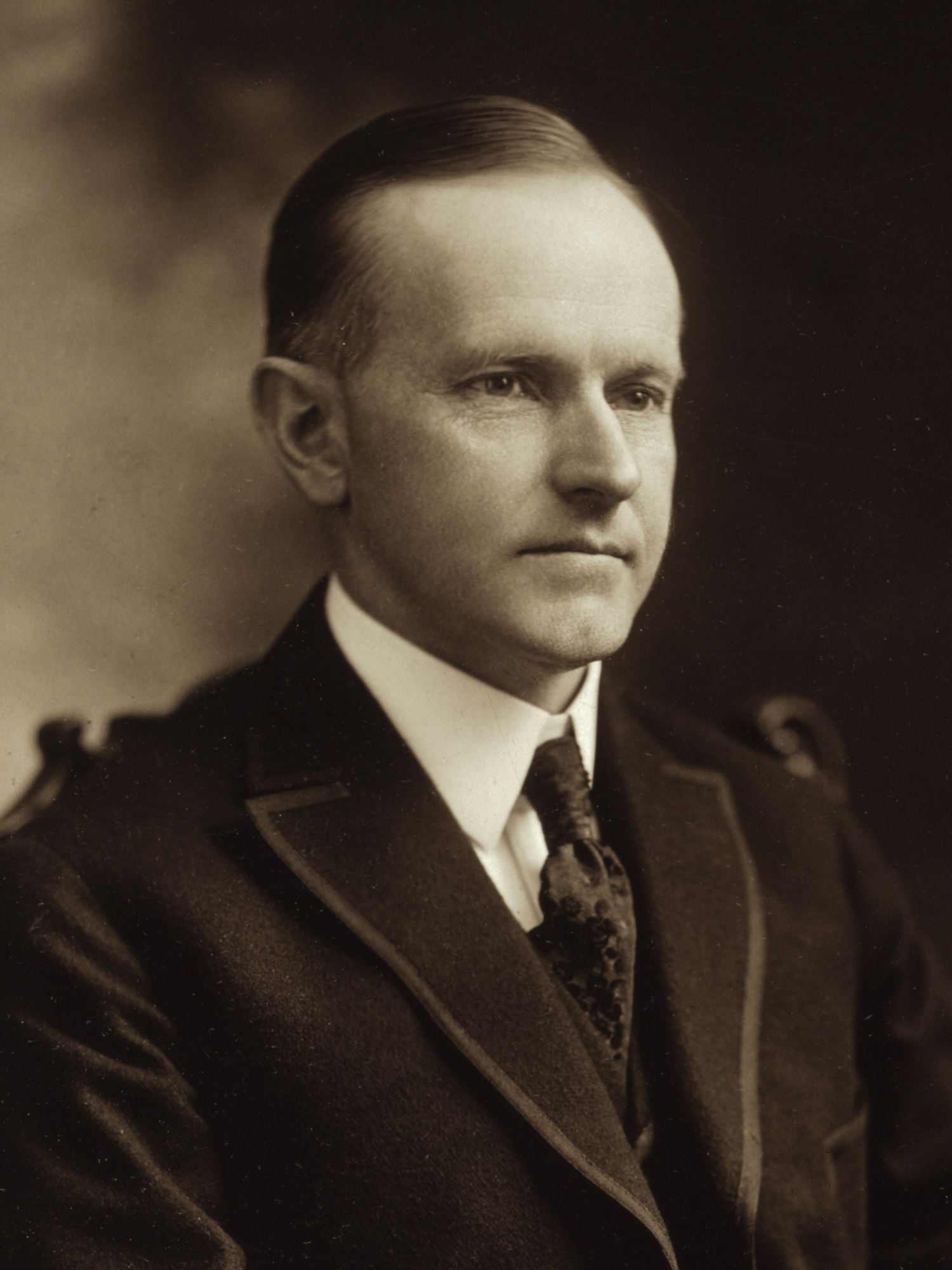
President Coolidge

- In Mexico City, 7 Catholics were killed in clashes between rioters and government agents who were taking over the Church of the Holy Family.
- U.S. President Calvin Coolidge expressed opposition to ex-general Billy Mitchell's advocation of a large air force, saying it would make the United States a militaristic nation and lead to an arms race.

== February 24, 1926 (Wednesday) ==
- French pilot Leon Collet was killed attempting to fly under the arch of the Eiffel Tower in a filmed stunt. The plane struck an aerial belonging to the wireless station.
- The film La Bohème, starring Lillian Gish and John Gilbert, opened.
- Died:
  - John Jacob Bausch, 95, German-born American optician who co-founded Bausch & Lomb
  - Eddie Plank, 50, American major league baseball player and inductee to the Baseball Hall of Fame

== February 25, 1926 (Thursday) ==
- The coronation of Prajadhipok as King Rama VII of Siam took place at the Grand Palace in Bangkok, with the crown being placed upon his head at the Phaisan Thaksin Hall.
- Born:
  - Leonard Linkow, American dentist and inventor known for his designing of various dental implants, and the only dentist to be nominated for the Nobel Prize for Physiology or Medicine; in Brooklyn, New York City (d. 2017)
  - Billy Darnell, American professional wrestler; in Camden, New Jersey (d. 2007)

== February 26, 1926 (Friday) ==
- At Madison Square Garden, black boxer Tiger Flowers defeated white boxer Harry Greb to win boxing's World Middleweight Title.
- U.S. President Calvin Coolidge signed the Revenue Act of 1926 into law, reducing personal income taxes and inheritance taxes, along with eliminating the federal gift tax.
- Louis Armstrong and his Hot Five recorded "Heebie Jeebies", the song that made Armstrong a star as well as the first to popularize the technique of scat singing.
- The first broadcast of a sporting event on British radio was made, with the BBC covering the European flyweight boxing championship between Elky Clark of Scotland and Kid Socks of England.
- Tukojirao Holkar III, the Maharaja of Indore in British India (now part of Madhya Pradesh state in India), abdicated after a 23-year reign, and was succeeded by his son, Yashwant Rao Holkar II.
- Born:
  - William Pollack, British-born American immunologist who developed the Rho(D) immune globulin vaccine against Rh disease; in London (d. 2013)
  - Henry Molaison, American sufferer from epilepsy whose experimental treatment in 1953 (a bilateral medial temporal lobectomy) led to his inability to form new memories (d. 2008)
  - Doris Belack, American soap opera actress known for One Life to Live; in New York City (d. 2011).
- Died:
  - Peter Lange-Müller, 75, Danish composer"Lange-Müller, Peter Erasmus in Oxford Music Online". oxfordmusiconline.com.
  - Geoffrey Hemming, 27, British fighting ace with six aerial victories in World War One, was killed in a flying accident at Calshot in Hampshire while piloting a Fairey III biplane, and his passenger was fatally injured."Geoffrey William Hemming". The Aerodrome. 2015.

== February 27, 1926 (Saturday) ==
- At least 600 members of the Sicilian Mafia were arrested in Italy, including two mayors and other municipal officials.
- Born:
  - David H. Hubel, neurophysiologist and recipient of the Nobel Prize in Physiology or Medicine; in Windsor, Ontario, Canada (d. 2013)
  - Rashidi Kawawa, prime minister of Tanganyika in 1962 and of Tanzania from 1972 to 1977; in Matepwende, Namtumbo District (d. 2009)
- Died: Kishan Singh Gargaj, 40, Indian revolutionary and co-founder of the Babbar Akali movement, was hanged at the Lahore Central Jail in what is now Pakistan

== February 28, 1926 (Sunday) ==
- The island of Urta Tagay, under the Soviet Union's control since 1920, was formally transferred by the Soviets to control of the Emirate of Afghanistan, though the Urtatagai conflict did not end until August 15 when the Soviet government granted full recognition of Afghan sovereignty over the territory.
- Henry Simpson Lunn announced that he would turn over all his property and income except for $2,500 a year to promote unity among all churches and nations.
- Born:
  - Svetlana Alliluyeva, Soviet Russian writer, later known as Lana Peters, and the only daughter of Soviet premier Joseph Stalin; in Moscow (d. 2011)
  - Zaki Badr, Minister of the Interior and head of security services for Egypt from 1986 to 1990; in Essam(d. 1997)
  - Stanley Glasser, South African-born British composer; in Johannesburg (d. 2018)
