= Acton Vale, Quebec =

Acton Vale
- City
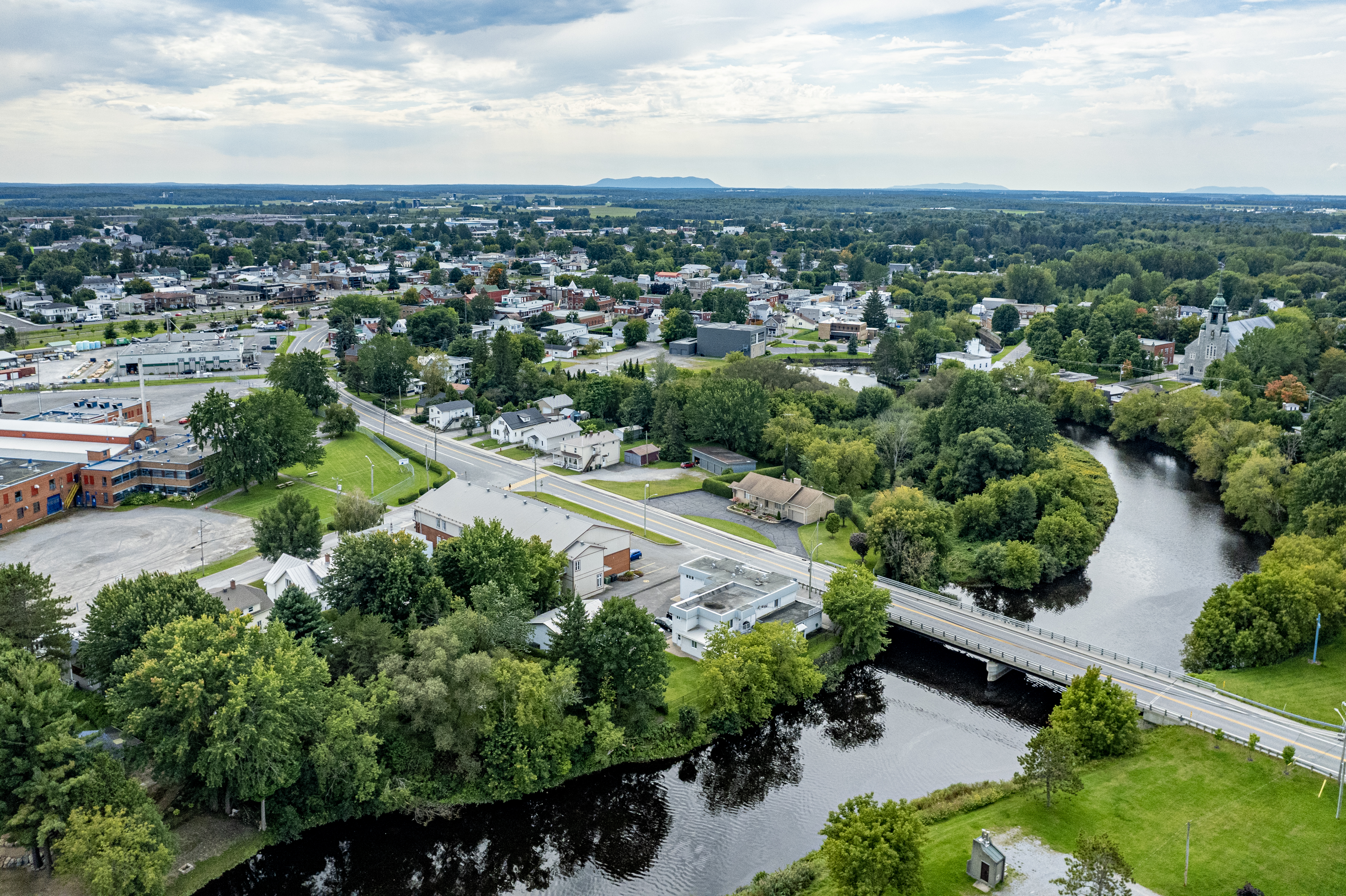
- Aerial view of Acton Vale

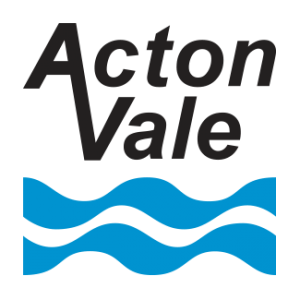
- Coat of arms Logo
- Motto: Actione Vale
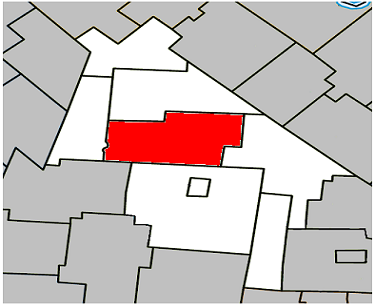
- Location within Acton RCM

- Location in southern Quebec
- Coordinates: 45°39′N 72°34′W
- Country: Canada
- Province: Quebec
- Region: Montérégie
- RCM: Acton
- Constituted: January 26, 2000

Government
  - Mayor: Éric Charbonneau
  - Federal riding: Saint-Hyacinthe—Bagot—Acton
  - Prov. riding: Daniel-Johnson

Area
  - Total: 91.20 km^{2} (35.21 sq mi)
  - Land: 91.01 km^{2} (35.14 sq mi)

Population (2021)
  - Total: 7,605
  - Density: 83.6/km^{2} (217/sq mi)
  - Pop 2016-2021: ▼0.7%
  - Dwellings: 3,628
- Time zone: UTC−5 (EST)
  - Summer (DST): UTC−4 (EDT)
- Postal code(s): J0H
- Area codes: 450 and 579
- Highways: R-116; R-139
- Website: www.ville.actonvale.qc.ca

Acton Vale is an industrial town in south central Quebec, Canada. It is the seat of the Acton Regional County Municipality and is in the Montérégie administrative region. Its population in the Canada 2021 Census was 7,605. The town covers an area of 90.96 km^{2} (35 sq. mi.).

By road, Acton Vale is 100 km (60 mi.) from the province's largest city, Montreal, and 190 km (120 mi.) from the province's capital, Quebec City. It is also 100 km (60 mi.) from the border with the United States. The town is listed as a Village rélais.

== History ==
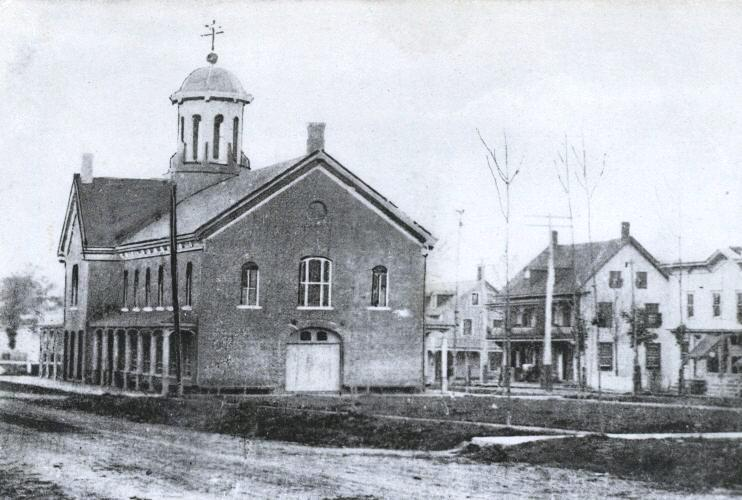
Acton Vale, 1910

While the Township of Acton was proclaimed in 1806, the area was opened up for settlement only in 1850 by the construction of the railroad. Incorporated in 1861, the town was named for Acton, a suburb of London, England. The name means "oak town". The town was once a centre for copper mining. Between 1860 and 1875, the Acton copper mine was one of the most important copper mines in the world, but the deposits were quickly depleted.

On January 26, 2000, the parish municipality of Saint-André-d'Acton was merged into the Town of Acton Vale.

== Communities ==
Beside Acton Vale is Lavoie, a community in the south of the municipality, accessible by Highway 139.

== Demographics ==
Historical census populations
Year	Pop.	±%
1986	6,343	—
1991	6,784	+7.0%
1996	7,172	+5.7%
2001	7,325	+2.1%
2006	7,584	+3.5%
2011	7,664	+1.1%
2016	7,656	−0.1%
2021	7,605	−0.7%
Population amounts prior to 2000 are total of Acton Vale V and Saint-André-d'Acton P. Population counts for 2001 and 2006 are adjusted for boundary change. Source: Statistics Canada

In the 2021 Census of Population conducted by Statistics Canada, Acton Vale had a population of 7,605 living in 3,479 of its 3,628 total private dwellings, a change of −0.7% from its 2016 population of 7,656. With a land area of 91.01 km^{2} (35.14 sq mi), it had a population density of 83.6/km^{2} (216.4/sq mi) in 2021.

Canada census – Acton Vale community profile

	2021	2016	2011
Population	7,605 (-0.7% from 2016)	7,656 (-0.1% from 2011)	7,664 (1.1% from 2006)
Land area	91.01 km^{2} (35.14 sq mi)	91.10 km^{2} (35.17 sq mi)	90.98 km^{2} (35.13 sq mi)
Population density	83.6/km^{2} (217/sq mi)	84.0/km^{2} (218/sq mi)	84.2/km^{2} (218/sq mi)
Median age	49.6 (M: 49.2, F: 50.4)	47.1 (M: 45.9, F: 48.5)	44.7 (M: 43.3, F: 46.1)
Private dwellings	3,628 (total) 3,479 (occupied)	3,594 (total)	3,489 (total)
Median household income	$57,600	$47,435	$42,983

References: 2021 2016 2011

Population by mother tongue
Group	2021 Census		2016 Census		2011 Census		2006 Census	
Group	Population	% of total	Population	% of Total	Population	% of Total	Population	% of Total
French	7,305	97.1	7,270	97.7	7,225	97.8	7,265	96.6
English	70	0.9	75	1.0	75	1.0	70	0.9
English and French	65	0.9	25	0.3	25	0.3	85	1.1
All other	85	1.1	75	1.0	65	0.9	100	1.4
Total	7,525	100.0	7,445	100.0	7,390	100.0	7,520	100.0

== Government ==
The mayor is Éric Charbonneau.

=== List of former mayors ===
- Éric Charbonneau (2009 - )
- Juliette Dupuis (2005 - 2009)
- Maurice Coutu (2001-2005)
- Anatole Bergeron (1993-2001)
- Gaston Gigère (????-1993)
- Roger Labrèque (1974-1986)
- Henri Boisvert (1966-1974)
- J.Edmour Gagnon (1963-1966)
- Lucien Désautels (1962-1963)
- Roger Labrèque (1948-1962)
- J.W. Cantin (1942-1948)
- J. Antonio Leclerc (1940-1942)
- Dr Philippe Adam (1934-1940)
- Ernest Boisvert (1932-1933)
- Auray Fontaine (1928-1932)
- Ernest Boisvert (1926-1928)
- Auray Fontaine (1924-1926)
- Dr. Léon Gauthier (1922-1924)
- J.E. Marcile (1918-1922)
- Dr. F.H. Daigneault (1916-1918)
- Charles Viens (1915-1916)
- David Lemay (1914-1915)
- Dr. F.H. Daigneault (1905-1914)
- Pierre Guertin (1902-1905)
- Georges Deslandes (1901-1902)
- J.E. Marcile (1900-1901)
- Milton McDonald (1897-1900)
- Auguste Dalpé (1896-1897)
- Alfred Saint-Amour (1895-1896)
- Pierre Guertin (1893-1895)
- Alfred Saint-Amour (1891-1893)
- Charles Roscony (1881-1891)
- N.H Dubois (1880-1881)
- Charles Roscony (1872-1880)
- Jérémie Morrier (1870-1872)
- J.A. Cushing (1868-1870)
- Charles F. McCallum (1866-1868)
- Jérémie Morrier (1864-1866)
- A.H. Dubrule (1863-1864)
- J.A. Cushing (1861-1863)

== Media ==
La Pensée de Bagot is the local newspaper for Acton Vale and the region.

== Notable people ==
- Kevin Asselin, born 1985, professional ice hockey player

== See also ==
- Municipal history of Quebec
- List of cities in Quebec
