= 15th Canadian Parliament =

1926 legislative term

- Minority parliament
- Jan. 7, 1926 – Jul. 2, 1926

Parliament leaders
- Prime minister: William Lyon Mackenzie King; Dec. 29, 1921 – Jun. 28, 1926
- Arthur Meighen; Jun. 29, 1926 – Sep. 25, 1926
- Cabinets: 12th Canadian Ministry; 13th Canadian Ministry
- Leader of the Opposition: Arthur Meighen; Dec. 29, 1921 – Jun. 28, 1926
- William Lyon Mackenzie King; Jun. 29, 1926 – Sep. 25, 1926

Party caucuses
- Government: Liberal Party (Note: The Conservative Party replaced the Liberal Party without an election on 29 June 1926 as a result of the King-Byng Affair.) (until June 1926)
- Conservative Party (after June 1926)
- Opposition: Conservative Party (until June 1926)
- Liberal Party (after June 1926)
- Crossbench: Progressive Party
- Labour
- United Farmers of Alberta

House of Commons
- Seating arrangements of the House of Commons
- Speaker of the Commons: Rodolphe Lemieux; 8 March 1922 – 2 June 1930
- Members: 245 MP seats List of members

Senate
- Speaker of the Senate: Hewitt Bostock; 7 February 1922 – 12 May 1930
- Government Senate leader: Raoul Dandurand; 29 December 1921 – 28 June 1926
- William Benjamin Ross; 28 June 1926 – 24 September 1926
- Opposition Senate leader: William Benjamin Ross; 1 January 1926 – 28 June 1926
- Raoul Dandurand; 29 June 1926 – 31 December 1926
- Senators: 96 senator seats List of senators

Sovereign
- Monarch: George V 6 May 1910 – 20 January 1936
- Governor general: Viscount Byng of Vimy; 11 August 1921 – 2 October 1926

Sessions
- 1st session January 7, 1926 – July 2, 1926
← 14th	→ 16th

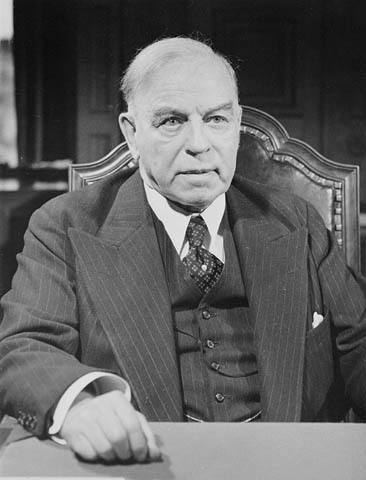
William Lyon Mackenzie King was Prime Minister during most of the 15th Canadian Parliament.

The 15th Canadian Parliament was in session from 7 January 1926, until 2 July 1926. The membership was set by the 1925 federal election on 29 October 1925, and it changed only somewhat due to resignations and by-elections until it was dissolved prior to the 1926 election.

Initially, it was controlled by a Liberal Party House minority under Prime Minister William Lyon Mackenzie King and the 12th Canadian Ministry. The Liberal caucus did not have a majority of seats in the House - it only had the second most seats - and was propped up by the Progressive Party of Canada MPs. The Official Opposition was the Conservative Party, led by Arthur Meighen. When the Liberal government fell, Meighen's Conservatives were allowed to form government (the 13th Canadian Ministry), triggering the "King-Byng Affair". Quickly the 13th Ministry fell as well.

The Speaker was Rodolphe Lemieux. See also List of Canadian electoral districts 1924-1933 for a list of the ridings in this parliament.

The unusual case of a new party taking control of the government between elections has only happened twice in Canadian history; the other occasion was in the 2nd Canadian parliament.

There was only one session of the 15th Parliament:

Session	Start	End
1st	7 January 1926	2 July 1926

== List of members ==
Following is a full list of members of the fifteenth Parliament listed first by province, then by electoral district.

Key:

- Party leaders are italicized.
- Cabinet ministers are in **boldface**.
- The Prime Minister is **both**.
- The Speaker is indicated by "(†)".

Electoral districts denoted by an asterisk (*) indicates that district was represented by two members.

=== Alberta ===
Riding	Name	Party	First elected/previously elected	No. of terms
Acadia	Robert Gardiner	Progressive	1921	3rd term
Athabaska	Charles Wilson Cross	Liberal	1925	1st term
Battle River	Henry Elvins Spencer	Progressive	1921	2nd term
Bow River	Edward Joseph Garland	Progressive	1921	2nd term
Calgary East	Fred Davis	Conservative	1925	1st term
Calgary West	**Richard Bedford Bennett**	Conservative	1911, 1925	2nd term*
Camrose	William Thomas Lucas	United Farmers of Alberta	1921	2nd term
Edmonton East	Ambrose Upton Gledstanes Bury	Conservative	1925	1st term
Edmonton West	**Charles Stewart**	Liberal	1925	1st term
Lethbridge	Lincoln Henry Jelliff	Progressive	1921	2nd term
Macleod	George Gibson Coote	Progressive	1921	2nd term
Medicine Hat	Frederick William Gershaw	Liberal	1925	1st term
Peace River	Donald MacBeth Kennedy	Progressive	1921	2nd term
Red Deer	Alfred Speakman	United Farmers of Alberta	1921	2nd term
Vegreville	Arthur Moren Boutillier	Progressive	1925	1st term
Wetaskiwin	Stanley Gilbert Tobin	Liberal	1925	1st term

=== British Columbia ===
Riding	Name	Party	First elected/previously elected	No. of terms
Cariboo	John Anderson Fraser	Conservative	1925	1st term
Comox—Alberni	Alan Webster Neill	Independent	1921	2nd term
Fraser Valley	Harry James Barber	Conservative	1925	1st term
Kootenay East	**James Horace King**	Liberal	1922	2nd term
Kootenay West	William Kemble Esling	Conservative	1925	1st term
Nanaimo	Charles Herbert Dickie	Conservative	1921	2nd term
New Westminster	William Garland McQuarrie	Conservative	1917	3rd term
Skeena	Alfred Stork	Liberal	1921	2nd term
Vancouver—Burrard	John Arthur Clark	Conservative	1921	2nd term
Vancouver Centre	**Henry Herbert Stevens**	Conservative	1911	4th term
Vancouver North	Dugald Donaghy	Liberal	1925	1st term
Vancouver South	Leon Johnson Ladner	Conservative	1921	2nd term
Victoria	**Simon Fraser Tolmie**	Conservative	1917	3rd term
Yale	Grote Stirling	Conservative	1924	2nd term

=== Manitoba ===
Riding	Name	Party	First elected/previously elected	No. of terms
Brandon	Robert Forke	Progressive	1921	2nd term
Dauphin	William John Ward	Progressive	1921	2nd term
Lisgar	John Livingstone Brown	Progressive	1921	2nd term
Macdonald	William James Lovie	Progressive	1921	2nd term
Marquette	Henry Alfred Mullins	Conservative	1925	1st term
Neepawa	Thomas Gerow Murphy	Conservative	1925	1st term
Nelson	Thomas William Bird	Progressive	1921	2nd term
Portage la Prairie	**Arthur Meighen**	Conservative	1908, 1922	5th term*
Provencher	Arthur-Lucien Beaubien	Progressive	1921	2nd term
Selkirk	Hannes Marino Hannesson	Conservative	1925	1st term
Souris	James Steedsman	Progressive	1921	2nd term
Springfield	Thomas Hay	Conservative	1917, (Note: Selkirk) 1925	2nd term*
St. Boniface	John Power Howden	Liberal	1925	1st term
Winnipeg North	Abraham Albert Heaps	Labour	1925	1st term
Winnipeg North Centre	James Shaver Woodsworth	Labour	1921	2nd term
Winnipeg South	Robert Rogers	Conservative	1911, 1925	2nd term*
Winnipeg South Centre	William Walker Kennedy	Conservative	1925	1st term

=== New Brunswick ===
Riding	Name	Party	First elected/previously elected	No. of terms
Charlotte	Robert Watson Grimmer	Conservative	1921	2nd term
Gloucester	Jean George Robichaud	Liberal	1922	2nd term
Kent	Alexandre-Joseph Doucet	Conservative	1923	2nd term
Northumberland	Charles Elijah Fish	Conservative	1925	1st term
Restigouche—Madawaska	Arthur Culligan	Conservative	1925	1st term
Royal	**George Burpee Jones**	Conservative	1921	2nd term
St. John—Albert*	Thomas Bell	Conservative	1925	1st term
St. John—Albert*	Murray Maclaren	Conservative	1921	2nd term
Victoria—Carleton	James Kidd Flemming	Conservative	1925	1st term
Westmorland	Otto Baird Price	Conservative	1925	1st term
York—Sunbury	Richard Hanson	Conservative	1921	3rd term

=== Nova Scotia ===
Riding	Name	Party	First elected/previously elected	No. of terms
Antigonish—Guysborough	**Edward Mortimer Macdonald**	Liberal	1904, (Note: Pictou) 1921	5th term*
Cape Breton North—Victoria	Lewis Wilkieson Johnstone	Conservative	1925	1st term
Cape Breton South	Finlay MacDonald	Conservative	1925	1st term
Colchester	George Taylor Macnutt	Conservative	1925	1st term
Cumberland	Robert Knowlton Smith	Conservative	1925	1st term
Digby—Annapolis	Harry Bernard Short	Conservative	1925	1st term
Halifax*	**William Anderson Black**	Conservative	1923	2nd term
Halifax*	Felix Patrick Quinn	Conservative	1925	1st term
Hants—Kings	Arthur de Witt Foster	Conservative	1911, 1925	2nd term*
Inverness	Isaac Duncan MacDougall	Conservative	1925	1st term
Pictou	Thomas Cantley	Conservative	1925	1st term
Queens—Lunenburg	William Duff	Liberal	1917	3rd term
Richmond—West Cape Breton	John Alexander MacDonald	Conservative	1925	1st term
Shelburne—Yarmouth	Paul Lacombe Hatfield	Liberal	1921	2nd term

=== Ontario ===
Riding	Name	Party	First elected/previously elected	No. of terms
Algoma East	George Brecken Nicholson	Conservative	1925	1st term
Algoma West	Thomas Edward Simpson	Conservative	1917	3rd term
Brantford City	Robert Edwy Ryerson	Conservative	1925	1st term
Brant	Franklin Smoke	Conservative	1925	1st term
Bruce North	James Malcolm	Liberal	1921	2nd term
Bruce South	Walter Allan Hall	Liberal	1925	1st term
Carleton	William Foster Garland	Conservative	1912, 1921	3rd term*
Dufferin—Simcoe	William Earl Rowe	Conservative	1925	1st term
Durham	Fred Wellington Bowen	Conservative	1921	2nd term
Elgin West	Hugh Cummings McKillop	Conservative	1921	2nd term
Essex East	**Raymond Ducharme Morand**	Conservative	1925	1st term
Essex South	**Eccles James Gott**	Conservative	1925	1st term
Essex West	Sidney Cecil Robinson	Conservative	1925	1st term
Fort William	**Robert James Manion**	Conservative	1917	3rd term
Frontenac—Addington	John Wesley Edwards	Conservative	1908, 1925	4th term*
Glengarry	Archibald John Macdonald	Liberal	1925	1st term
Grenville—Dundas	Arza Clair Casselman	Conservative	1921, 1925	2nd term*
Grey North	Matthew Robert Duncan	Conservative	1921	2nd term
Grey Southeast	Agnes Campbell Macphail	Progressive	1921	2nd term
Haldimand	Mark Cecil Senn	Conservative	1921	2nd term
Halton	Robert King Anderson	Conservative	1917	3rd term
Hamilton East	Sydney Chilton Mewburn	Conservative	1917	3rd term
Hamilton West	Charles William Bell	Conservative	1925	1st term
Hastings—Peterborough	Alexander Thomas Embury	Conservative	1925	1st term
Hastings South	William Ernest Tummon	Conservative	1925	1st term
Huron North	John Warwick King	Progressive	1921	2nd term
Huron South	Thomas McMillan	Liberal	1925	1st term
Kenora—Rainy River	Peter Heenan	Liberal	1925	1st term
Kent	Alexander Dew Chaplin	Conservative	1925	1st term
Kingston City	Arthur Edward Ross	Conservative	1921	2nd term
Lambton East	Joseph Elijah Armstrong	Conservative	1904, 1925	6th term*
Lambton West	William Thomas Goodison	Liberal	1925	1st term
Lanark	Richard Franklin Preston	Conservative	1922	2nd term
Leeds	Hugh Alexander Stewart	Conservative	1921	2nd term
Lincoln	**James Dew Chaplin**	Conservative	1917	3rd term
London	John Franklin White	Conservative	1921	2nd term
Middlesex East	Adam King Hodgins	Conservative	1925	1st term
Middlesex West	**John Campbell Elliott** (until 8 March 1926 ministerial appointment)	Liberal	1925	1st term
Middlesex West	**John Campbell Elliott** (by-election of 1926-03-29)	Liberal	1925	1st term
Muskoka—Ontario	Peter McGibbon	Conservative	1925	1st term
Nipissing	Edmond Lapierre	Liberal	1921	2nd term
Norfolk—Elgin	John Lawrence Stansell	Conservative	1921	2nd term
Northumberland	Milton Edgar Maybee	Conservative	1921	2nd term
Ontario	Thomas Erlin Kaiser	Conservative	1925	1st term
Ottawa (City of)*	John Léo Chabot	Conservative	1911, 1925	3rd term*
Ottawa (City of)*	Stewart McClenaghan	Conservative	1925	1st term
Oxford North	Donald Matheson Sutherland	Conservative	1925	1st term
Oxford South	**Donald Sutherland**	Conservative	1911	4th term
Parkdale	David Spence	Conservative	1921	2nd term
Parry Sound	James Arthurs	Conservative	1908	5th term
Peel	Samuel Charters	Conservative	1917	3rd term
Perth North	David McKenzie Wright	Conservative	1925	1st term
Perth South	Frederick George Sanderson	Liberal	1925	1st term
Peterborough West	Edward Armour Peck	Conservative	1925	1st term
Port Arthur—Thunder Bay	William Fitzgerald Langworthy	Conservative	1925	1st term
Prescott	Gustave Evanturel	Liberal	1925	1st term
Prince Edward—Lennox	John Hubbs	Conservative	1921	2nd term
Renfrew North	Ira Delbert Cotnam	Conservative	1925	1st term
Renfrew South	Martin James Maloney	Conservative	1925	1st term
Russell	**Alfred Goulet**	Liberal	1925	1st term
Simcoe East	Alfred Burke Thompson	Conservative	1925	1st term
Simcoe North	William Alves Boys	Conservative	1921	2nd term
Stormont	Charles James Hamilton	Conservative	1925	1st term
Timiskaming North	John Raymond O'Neill	Conservative	1925	1st term
Timiskaming South	Ernest Frederick Armstrong	Conservative	1925	1st term
Toronto East	**Edmond Baird Ryckman**	Conservative	1921	2nd term
Toronto East Centre	Edmund James Bristol	Conservative	1905	6th term
Toronto—High Park	Alexander James Anderson	Conservative	1925	1st term
Toronto Northeast	Richard Langton Baker	Conservative	1925	1st term
Toronto Northwest	Thomas Langton Church	Conservative	1921	2nd term
Toronto—Scarborough	Joseph Henry Harris	Conservative	1921	2nd term
Toronto South	George Reginald Geary	Conservative	1925	1st term
Toronto West Centre	Horatio Clarence Hocken	Conservative	1917	3rd term
Victoria	Thomas Hubert Stinson	Conservative	1925	1st term
Waterloo North	William Daum Euler	Liberal	1917	3rd term
Waterloo South	Alexander McKay Edwards	Conservative	1925	1st term
Welland	George Hamilton Pettit	Conservative	1925	1st term
Wellington North	Duncan Sinclair	Conservative	1925	1st term
Wellington South	**Hugh Guthrie**	Conservative	1900	7th term
Wentworth	Gordon Crooks Wilson	Conservative	1911	4th term
York North	Thomas Herbert Lennox	Conservative	1925	1st term
York South	William Findlay Maclean	Independent Conservative	1892	9th term
York West	**Henry Lumley Drayton**	Conservative	1919	3rd term

=== Prince Edward Island ===
Riding	Name	Party	First elected/previously elected	No. of terms
King's	**John Alexander Macdonald**	Conservative	1925	1st term
Prince	Alfred Edgar MacLean	Liberal	1921	2nd term
Queen's*	Robert Harold Jenkins	Liberal	1925	1st term
Queen's*	John Albert Messervy	Conservative	1925	1st term

=== Quebec ===
Riding	Name	Party	First elected/previously elected	No. of terms
Argenteuil	**George Halsey Perley**	Conservative	1904, 1925	4th term*
Bagot	Joseph Edmond Marcile (died in office)	Liberal	1898	8th term
Bagot	Georges Dorèze Morin (by-election of 1925-12-07)	Liberal	1925	1st term
Beauce	**Édouard Lacroix**	Liberal	1925	1st term
Beauharnois	Maxime Raymond	Liberal	1925	1st term
Bellechasse	Charles Alphonse Fournier	Liberal	1917	3rd term
Berthier—Maskinongé	Joseph-Charles-Théodore Gervais	Liberal	1917	3rd term
Bonaventure	Charles Marcil	Liberal	1900	7th term
Brome—Missisquoi	William Frederic Kay	Liberal	1911	4th term
Cartier	Samuel William Jacobs	Liberal	1917	3rd term
Chambly—Verchères	Aimé Langlois	Liberal	1925	1st term
Champlain	Arthur Lesieur Desaulniers	Liberal	1917	3rd term
Charlevoix—Saguenay	Pierre-François Casgrain	Liberal	1917	3rd term
Châteauguay—Huntingdon	**James Alexander Robb**	Liberal	1908	5th term
Chicoutimi	Julien-Édouard-Alfred Dubuc	Independent Liberal	1925	1st term
Compton	Joseph Étienne Letellier de Saint-Just	Liberal	1925	1st term
Dorchester	**Lucien Cannon**	Liberal	1917	3rd term
Drummond—Arthabaska	Wilfrid Girouard	Liberal	1925	1st term
Gaspé	Rodolphe Lemieux (†)	Liberal	1896	8th term
Hochelaga	Édouard-Charles St-Père	Liberal	1921	2nd term
Hull	Joseph-Éloi Fontaine	Liberal	1917	3rd term
Jacques Cartier	Joseph-Théodule Rhéaume	Liberal	1922	2nd term
Joliette	Jean-Joseph Denis	Liberal	1917	3rd term
Kamouraska	Joseph Georges Bouchard	Liberal	1922	2nd term
Labelle	Joseph Henri Napoléon Bourassa	Independent	1896, (Note: First elected as a Liberal) 1925	4th term*
Lake St. John	Armand Sylvestre	Liberal	1925	1st term
Laprairie—Napierville	Roch Lanctôt	Liberal	1904	6th term
L'Assomption—Montcalm	Paul-Arthur Séguin	Liberal	1908	5th term
Laurier—Outremont	Joseph-Alexandre Mercier	Liberal	1925	1st term
Laval—Two Mountains	Liguori Lacombe	Liberal	1925	1st term
Lévis	Joseph-Étienne Dussault	Liberal	1925	1st term
L'Islet	Joseph-Fernand Fafard	Liberal	1917	3rd term
Lotbinière	Joseph-Achille Verville	Liberal	1925	1st term
Maisonneuve	Clément Robitaille	Liberal	1921	2nd term
Matane	Georges-Léonidas Dionne	Liberal	1925	1st term
Mégantic	Eusèbe Roberge	Liberal	1922	2nd term
Montmagny	Léo Kemner Laflamme	Liberal	1925	1st term
Mount Royal	Robert Smeaton White	Conservative	1888, (Note: Cardwell (Ontario)) 1925	3rd term*
Nicolet	Joseph-Félix Descoteaux	Liberal	1923	2nd term
Pontiac	Frank S. Cahill	Liberal	1917	3rd term
Portneuf	Michel-Siméon Delisle	Liberal	1900	7th term
Québec—Montmorency	Henri-Edgar Lavigueur	Liberal	1917	3rd term
Quebec East	**Ernest Lapointe**	Liberal	1904	7th term
Quebec South	Charles Gavan Power	Liberal	1917	3rd term
Quebec West	Georges Parent	Liberal	1904, (Note: Montmorency) 1917	5th term*
Richelieu	**Arthur Cardin**	Liberal	1911	4th term
Richmond—Wolfe	Edmund William Tobin	Liberal	1900	7th term
Rimouski	Eugène Fiset	Liberal	1924	2nd term
St. Ann	James John Edmund Guérin	Liberal	1925	1st term
St. Antoine	Leslie Gordon Bell	Conservative	1925	1st term
St. Denis	Joseph-Arthur Denis	Liberal	1921	2nd term
St. Henri	Paul Mercier	Liberal	1921	2nd term
St. Hyacinthe—Rouville	René Morin	Liberal	1921	2nd term
St. James	Fernand Rinfret	Liberal	1920	3rd term
St. Johns—Iberville	Aldéric-Joseph Benoit	Liberal	1922	2nd term
St. Lawrence—St. George	Charles Cahan	Conservative	1925	1st term
St. Mary	Hermas Deslauriers	Liberal	1917	3rd term
Shefford	**Georges Henri Boivin**	Liberal	1911	4th term
Sherbrooke	Charles Benjamin Howard	Liberal	1925	1st term
Stanstead	Willis Keith Baldwin	Liberal	1917	3rd term
Témiscouata	Jean-François Pouliot	Liberal	1924	2nd term
Terrebonne	Jules-Édouard Prévost	Liberal	1917	3rd term
Three Rivers—St. Maurice	Arthur Bettez	Liberal	1925	1st term
Vaudreuil—Soulanges	Lawrence Alexander Wilson	Liberal	1925	1st term
Wright	Fizalam-William Perras	Liberal	1925	1st term
Yamaska	Aimé Boucher	Liberal	1921	3rd term

=== Saskatchewan ===
Riding	Name	Party	First elected/previously elected	No. of terms
Assiniboia	Robert McKenzie	Liberal	1925	1st term
Humboldt	Albert Frederick Totzke	Liberal	1925	1st term
Kindersley	Archibald M. Carmichael	Progressive	1921	2nd term
Last Mountain	William Russell Fansher	Progressive	1925	1st term
Long Lake	John Frederick Johnston	Progressive	1917 (Note: First elected as a Unionist)	3rd term
Long Lake	John Frederick Johnston	Liberal	1917	3rd term
Mackenzie	Milton Neil Campbell	Progressive	1921	2nd term
Maple Creek	George Spence	Liberal	1925	1st term
Melfort	Malcolm McLean	Liberal	1925	1st term
Melville	**William Richard Motherwell**	Liberal	1921	2nd term
Moose Jaw	John Gordon Ross	Liberal	1925	1st term
North Battleford	Cameron Ross McIntosh	Liberal	1925	1st term
Prince Albert	Charles McDonald (until 15 January 1926 resignation to allow seat for Mackenzie King)	Liberal	1925	1st term
Prince Albert	**William Lyon Mackenzie King** (by-election of 1926-02-15)	Liberal	1908, (Note: Waterloo North (Ontario)) 1919, (Note: Prince (PEI)/York North (Ontario)) 1926	4th term*
Qu'Appelle	John Millar	Progressive	1921	2nd term
Regina	Francis Nicholson Darke (resigned 20 February 1926 to allow seat for Dunning)	Liberal	1925	1st term
Regina	**Charles Avery Dunning** (by-election of 1926-03-16)	Liberal	1926	1st term
Rosetown	John Evans	Progressive	1921	2nd term
Saskatoon	Alexander MacGillivray Young	Liberal	1925	1st term
South Battleford	John Vallance	Liberal	1925	1st term
Swift Current	Charles Edward Bothwell	Liberal	1925	1st term
Weyburn	Edward James Young	Liberal	1925	1st term
Willow Bunch	Thomas F. Donnelly	Liberal	1925	1st term
Yorkton	George Washington McPhee	Liberal	1925	1st term

=== Yukon ===
Riding	Name	Party	First elected/previously elected	No. of terms
Yukon	George Black	Conservative	1921	2nd term

== By-elections ==
By-election	Date	Incumbent	Party	Winner	Party	Cause	Retained
Middlesex West	March 29, 1926	John Campbell Elliott	Liberal	John Campbell Elliott	Liberal	Recontested upon appointment as Minister of Labour	Yes
Regina	March 16, 1926	Francis Nicholson Darke	Liberal	Charles Avery Dunning	Liberal	Resignation to provide a seat for Dunning	Yes
Prince Albert	February 15, 1926	Charles McDonald	Liberal	William Lyon Mackenzie King	Liberal	Resignation to provide a seat for Mackenzie King	Yes
Bagot	December 7, 1925	Joseph Edmond Marcile	Liberal	Georges Dorèze Morin	Liberal	Death	Yes
