= Cyrille Dumaine =

Canadian politician

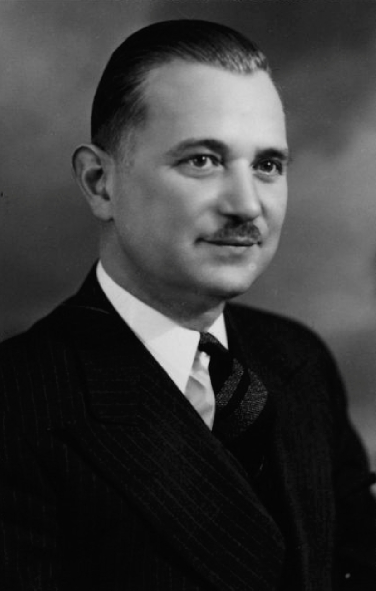

Member of the Canadian Parliament for Bagot
- In office 1930–1935
- Preceded by: Georges Dorèze Morin
- Succeeded by: District merged with St. Hyacinthe—Rouville

Member of the Legislative Assembly of Quebec for Bagot
- In office 1935–1938
- Preceded by: Joseph-Émery Phaneuf
- Succeeded by: Philippe Adam
- In office 1939–1946
- Preceded by: Philippe Adam
- Succeeded by: Daniel Johnson Sr.

24th Speaker of the Legislative Assembly
- In office 1943–1945
- Preceded by: Valmore Bienvenue
- Succeeded by: Alexandre Taché

Personal details
- Born: July 8, 1897 Saint-Hugues, Quebec
- Died: October 11, 1946 (aged 49) Ottawa, Ontario
- Party: Federal: Liberal; Provincial: Quebec Liberal Party

Cyrille Dumaine (French pronunciation: [siʁil dymɛn]; July 8, 1897 – October 11, 1946) was a Canadian politician from Quebec. He was born on July 8, 1897, in Saint-Hugues and was a notary.

== Member of Parliament ==
Dumaine successfully ran as a Liberal Party of Canada candidate for the Bagot district in a 27 January 1930 by-election. He was re-elected there in the 1930 federal election. He did not run for re-election in the 1935 election.

== Provincial politics ==
He ran as a Liberal Party of Quebec candidate in the 1935 election for the district of Bagot and won. He was re-elected in the 1936 election, but his election was cancelled and he lost the subsequent by-election against Union Nationale candidate Philippe Adam.

Dumaine was re-elected in the 1939 and 1944 elections.

== Speaker of the House ==
He served as Deputy Speaker from 1942 to 1943 and as Speaker of the House from 1943 to 1945.

== Death ==
Dumaine died in office on October 11, 1946. He was succeeded by Union Nationale politician Daniel Johnson Sr.

== Electoral record ==
By-election on Mr. Morin's death, 27 January 1930
Party	Candidate	Votes	%	±%
Liberal	Cyrille Dumaine	acclaimed		

1930 Canadian federal election: Bagot
Party	Candidate	Votes	%	±%
Liberal	Cyrille Dumaine	3,654		
Conservative	Léon Gauthier	3,479		
Source: lop.parl.ca
