= Bagot (provincial electoral district) =

Coordinates: 45°42′N 72°38′W

Quebec electoral district

Defunct provincial electoral district
- Legislature: National Assembly of Quebec
- District created: 1867
- District abolished: 1972
- First contested: 1867
- Last contested: 1970

Bagot was a former provincial electoral district in the Estrie region of Quebec, Canada. It elected members to the National Assembly of Quebec (earlier known as the Legislative Assembly of Quebec).

It was created for the 1867 election, and an electoral district of that name existed even earlier: see Bagot (Province of Canada). Its final election was in 1970. It disappeared in the 1973 election and its successor electoral district was Johnson.

Bagot was named in honour of British diplomat and former governor general of the United Province of Canada from 1841 to 1843 Charles Bagot.

== Members of the Legislative Assembly / National Assembly ==
- Pierre-Samuel Gendron, Conservative Party (1867–1876)
- Flavien Dupont, Conservative Party (1876–1878)
- Narcisse Blais, Liberal (1878–1881)
- Antoine Casavant, Conservative Party (1881–1886)
- Joseph Pilon, Liberal (1886–1890)
- Milton McDonald, Conservative Party (1890–1900)
- Frédéric-Hector Daigneault, Liberal (1900–1913)
- Joseph-Émery Phaneuf, Liberal (1913–1935)
- Cyrille Dumaine, Liberal (1935–1937)
- Philippe Adam, Union Nationale (1938–1939)
- Cyrille Dumaine, Liberal (1939–1946)
- Daniel Johnson Sr., Union Nationale (1946–1968)
- Jean-Guy Cardinal, Union Nationale (1968–1973)
