= Frédéric-Hector Daigneault =

Canadian politician (1860–1933)

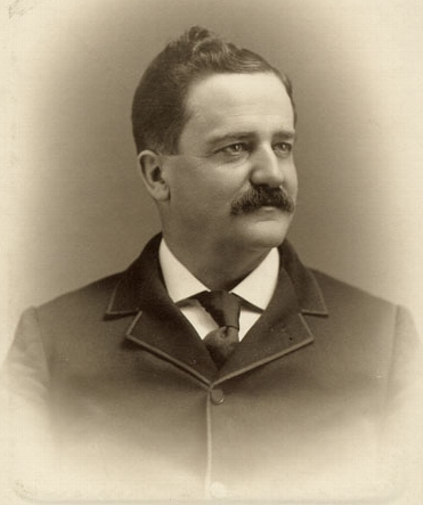

Member of the Legislative Assembly of Quebec for Bagot
- In office 1900–1913
- Preceded by: Milton McDonald
- Succeeded by: Joseph-Émery Phaneuf

Personal details
- Born: May 19, 1860 Chambly, Canada East
- Died: February 26, 1933 (aged 72) Acton Vale, Quebec
- Party: Liberal

Frédéric-Hector Daigneault (May 19, 1860 – February 26, 1933) was a Canadian provincial politician.

Born in Chambly, Canada East, Daigneault was a member of the Municipal Council for Acton Vale, Quebec for 10 years. He was mayor from 1905 to 1914 and from 1916 to 1918. He was the Liberal member of the Legislative Assembly of Quebec for Bagot from 1900 to 1913.
