= Philippe Adam =

Canadian politician

Member of the Legislative Assembly of Quebec for Bagot
- In office 1938–1939
- Preceded by: Cyrille Dumaine
- Succeeded by: Cyrille Dumaine

Personal details
- Born: October 7, 1886 Saint-Hyacinthe, Quebec
- Died: October 5, 1963 (aged 76) Outremont, Quebec
- Resting place: Notre Dame des Neiges Cemetery
- Party: Union Nationale

Philippe Adam (December 7, 1886 – October 5, 1963) was a Canadian provincial politician. He was the Union Nationale member of the Legislative Assembly of Quebec for Bagot from 1938 to 1939. He was also mayor of Acton Vale, Quebec from 1934 to 1940.
