= Pierre-Samuel Gendron =

Canadian politician

Member of the Canadian Parliament for Bagot
- In office 1867–1874
- Succeeded by: Joseph-Alfred Mousseau

Member of the Legislative Assembly of Quebec for Bagot
- In office 1867–1876
- Succeeded by: Flavien Dupont

Personal details
- Born: August 31, 1828 Sainte-Rosalie, Lower Canada
- Died: June 11, 1889 (aged 60) Saint-Hyacinthe, Quebec
- Party: Conservative
- Other political affiliations: Conservative Party of Quebec
- Relations: Flavien Dupont, nephew

Pierre-Samuel Gendron (August 31, 1828 – June 11, 1889) was a notary and political figure in Quebec, Canada. He represented Bagot in the House of Commons of Canada as a Conservative from 1867 to 1874 and in the Legislative Assembly of Quebec from 1867 to 1876.

He was born in Sainte-Rosalie in 1828 and studied at the Séminaire de Saint-Hyacinthe until he was forced to leave due to health problems. He taught for a while in the region, then articled as a notary, qualifying to practice in 1860. In 1850, Gendron married Louise Fournier. He was elected to both the provincial and federal legislatures in 1867. In 1869, he founded the Société de Colonisation du Comté de Bagot and became its first president. Gendron did not run in 1874 for a federal seat after a so-called "dual mandate" became illegal; he was elected again to the Quebec assembly in 1871 and 1875. He resigned his seat to become prothonotary for the Quebec Superior Court in Montreal district serving until 1887, when he returned to Saint-Hyacinthe. Gendron was also president of the Lake Champlain and St. Lawrence Junction Railway.

He died in Saint-Hyacinthe in 1889 and was buried at Sainte-Rosalie.

His nephew Flavien Dupont also represented Bagot in the Quebec assembly and in the House of Commons.

1867 Canadian federal election: Bagot
Party	Candidate	Votes
Conservative	Pierre-Samuel Gendron	1,156
Unknown	Maurice Laframboise	889
Source: Canadian Elections Database

1872 Canadian federal election: Bagot
Party	Candidate	Votes	%	±%
Conservative	Pierre-Samuel Gendron	1,184		
Unknown	Forsyth	4		
Source: Canadian Elections Database
