= Joseph Pilon =

Canadian politician

Member of the Legislative Assembly of Quebec for Bagot
- In office 1886–1890
- Preceded by: Antoine Casavant
- Succeeded by: Milton McDonald

Personal details
- Born: March 27, 1826 Vaudreuil, Lower Canada
- Died: April 18, 1909 (aged 83) Upton, Quebec
- Party: Liberal

Joseph Pilon (March 27, 1826 – April 18, 1909) was a farmer, merchant and political figure in Quebec. He represented Bagot in the Legislative Assembly of Quebec from 1886 to 1890 as a Liberal member.

He was born in Vaudreuil, Lower Canada, the son of Toussaint Pilon. Pilon owned a mill at Saint-Éphrem-d'Upton. He was mayor of Saint-Ephrem-d'Upton for 37 years. He also served as justice of the peace for Saint-Hyacinthe district and as a member of the school board. In 1852, he married Marie Bricot. Pilon ran unsuccessfully for a seat in the Quebec assembly in 1867. He was defeated by Milton McDonald when he ran for reelection in 1890 and was an unsuccessful candidate for a seat in the House of Commons in 1891. Pilon served as associate registrar for Bagot County from 1898 until his death in Upton at the age of 83.
