= Kevin Asselin =

Canadian ice hockey player

- Born: February 9, 1985 (age 40); Acton Vale, Quebec
- Height: 6 ft 00 in (183 cm)
- Weight: 210 lb (95 kg; 15 st 0 lb)
- Position: Right wing
- Shot: Right
- Played for: Texas Wildcatters; Bakersfield Condors; Columbia Inferno
- Playing career: 2006–2011

Kevin Asselin (born February 9, 1985, in Acton Vale, Quebec) is a professional ice hockey player.

Asselin was drafted by the Cape Breton Screaming Eagles in Round 2 (22nd overall) of the 2001 Quebec Major Junior Hockey League draft. He demonstrated plenty of offensive potential during his junior hockey career, scoring 121 goals between 2001 and 2006, all spent as a member of the Screaming Eagles. In his final junior season, Asselin scored 44 goals and added 44 assists for a total of 88 points in 67 games. Asselin was never drafted by a National Hockey League team.

He split the 2006–07 season between the Texas Wildcatters, Bakersfield Condors, and Columbia Inferno of the ECHL.

Asselin was a member of the Saint-Hyacinthe Chiefs of the Ligue Nord-Américaine de Hockey (LNAH) for two seasons, scoring a league leading 48 goals in 2007–08. He was named the LNAH's top offensive rookie, as well as the league's most valuable player in recognition of his season. He was claimed by the Thetford Mines Isothermic in a dispersal draft in 2009 after the Chiefs ceased operations.

In February, 2012, the Cape Breton Post named Asselin to the all-time All-Star Team of his former junior club, the Cape Breton Screaming Eagles, saying "the numbers don’t show the heart Asselin played with on the ice".

== Career statistics ==
			Regular season					Playoffs
Season	Team	League	GP	G	A	Pts	PIM	GP	G	A	Pts	PIM
2001-02	Cape Brenton Screaming Eagles	QMJHL	56	2	6	8	69	4	0	0	0	25
2002-03	Cape Brenton Screaming Eagles	QMJHL	71	28	27	55	131	3	0	0	0	4
2003-04	Cape Brenton Screaming Eagles	QMJHL	52	16	21	37	44	5	0	1	1	8
2004-05	Cape Brenton Screaming Eagles	QMJHL	66	31	28	59	63	5	1	4	5	12
2005-06	Cape Brenton Screaming Eagles	QMJHL	67	44	44	88	92	8	1	2	3	18
2006-07	Texas Wildcatters	ECHL	1	0	0	0	2	—	—	—	—	—
2006-07	Bakersfield Condors	ECHL	41	3	8	11	36	—	—	—	—	—
2006-07	Columbia Inferno	ECHL	13	2	2	4	10	—	—	—	—	—
2007-08	St. Hyacinthe Top Design	LNAH	52	50	38	88	64	—	—	—	—	—
2008-09	St. Hyacinthe Chiefs	LNAH	18	6	10	16	22	—	—	—	—	—
2009-10	Saguenay Marquis	LNAH	39	15	21	36	42	—	—	—	—	—
2010-11	Saguenay Marquis	LNAH	42	23	15	38	52	—	—	—	—	—
2011-12	Trois-Rivieres Caron and Guay	LNAH	46	19	23	42	34	—	—	—	—	—
2012-13	Trois-Rivieres Caron and Guay	LNAH	30	10	8	18	42	—	—	—	—	—
2013-14	Trois-Rivieres Vikings	LNAH	37	11	15	26	35	—	—	—	—	—
2014-15	Trois-Rivieres Blizzard	LNAH	3	1	1	2	2	—	—	—	—	—
QMJHL totals			312	121	126	247	399	25	2	7	9	67
ECHL totals			55	5	10	15	48	—	—	—	—	—
LNAH totals			267	135	131	266	293	—	—	—	—	—
