= Flavien Dupont =

Canadian politician

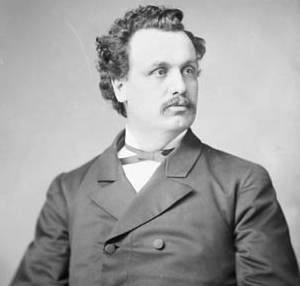

Member of the Canadian Parliament for Bagot
- In office 1882–1898
- Preceded by: Joseph-Alfred Mousseau
- Succeeded by: Joseph Edmond Marcile

Member of the Legislative Assembly of Quebec for Bagot
- In office 1876–1878
- Preceded by: Pierre-Samuel Gendron
- Succeeded by: Narcisse Blais

Personal details
- Born: February 13, 1847 Saint-Simon, Canada East
- Died: March 12, 1898 (aged 51) Sherbrooke, Quebec
- Party: Conservative
- Other political affiliations: Quebec Conservative Party
- Relations: Pierre-Samuel Gendron, uncle

Flavien Dupont (February 13, 1847 – March 12, 1898) was a Canadian notary and political figure in Quebec. He represented Bagot in the Legislative Assembly of Quebec from 1876 to 1878 and Bagot in the House of Commons of Canada from 1882 to 1898 as a Conservative member.

== Life ==
He was born in Saint-Simon, Canada East, the son of Flavien Dupont and Nathalie Fournier. Dupont was educated at the Séminaire de Saint-Hyacinthe, was admitted as a notary in 1873 and set up practice at Saint-Liboire. He served as secretary-treasurer for Bagot County from 1874 to 1898 and was also secretary-treasurer for the Society for Agriculture and Colonization of Bagot County. Dupont was elected to the provincial assembly in an 1876 by-election held after his uncle Pierre-Samuel Gendron was named prothonotary for the Quebec Superior Court; he was defeated when he ran for reelection in 1878. He was elected to the House of Commons in an 1882 by-election held after Joseph-Alfred Mousseau became Quebec premier. He died in office in Sherbrooke at the age of 51.

== Electoral record ==
By-election on Mr. Mousseau's accepting a seat in the Quebec Cabinet, 12 September 1882
| Party | Candidate | Votes | % | ±% |
|---|---|---|---|---|
| Conservative | Flavien Dupont | 1,408 | | |
| Unknown | O. Desmarais | 1,107 | | |

1887 Canadian federal election: Bagot
| Party | Candidate | Votes | % | ±% |
|---|---|---|---|---|
| Conservative | Flavien Dupont | acclaimed | | |

1891 Canadian federal election: Bagot
| Party | Candidate | Votes | % | ±% |
|---|---|---|---|---|
| Conservative | Flavien Dupont | 1,582 | | |
| Liberal | J. Pilon | 1,529 | | |

1896 Canadian federal election: Bagot
| Party | Candidate | Votes | % | ±% |
|---|---|---|---|---|
| Conservative | Flavien Dupont | acclaimed | | |
