= Joseph-Émery Phaneuf =

Canadian politician

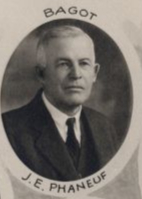

Member of the Legislative Assembly of Quebec for Bagot
- In office 1913–1935
- Preceded by: Frédéric-Hector Daigneault
- Succeeded by: Cyrille Dumaine

Personal details
- Born: February 14, 1863 Saint-Hugues, Canada East
- Died: August 9, 1935 (aged 72) Saint-Hugues, Quebec
- Party: Liberal

Joseph-Émery Phaneuf (French pronunciation: [ʒozɛf ɛmʁi fanœf]; February 14, 1863 – August 9, 1935) was a Quebec provincial politician during the first half of the 20th century.

Born in Saint-Hugues, Canada East, Phaneuf owned the general store of Saint-Hugues for over 20 years, and later a successful hay merchant. He was one of the founding partners of the Group Commerce Insurance companies and a director of these French Canadian insurance companies until his death.

Phaneuf was first elected in the Legislative Assembly of Quebec in a by-election in 1913 in the riding of Bagot (now part of Johnson). He remained the MLA for 22 years until his death in 1935. He also served as mayor of his birth town of Saint-Hughes during his provincial political career from 1917 to 1931. As mayor he was responsible for paving the village streets, something unheard of in villages of that size at that time. He was also responsible for bringing electricity to the village. He was a member of the Quebec Liberal Party, which was in power during his entire tenure as MLA. He introduced a number of laws regulating the insurance industry, then in its infancy.
