= Narcisse Blais =

Canadian politician

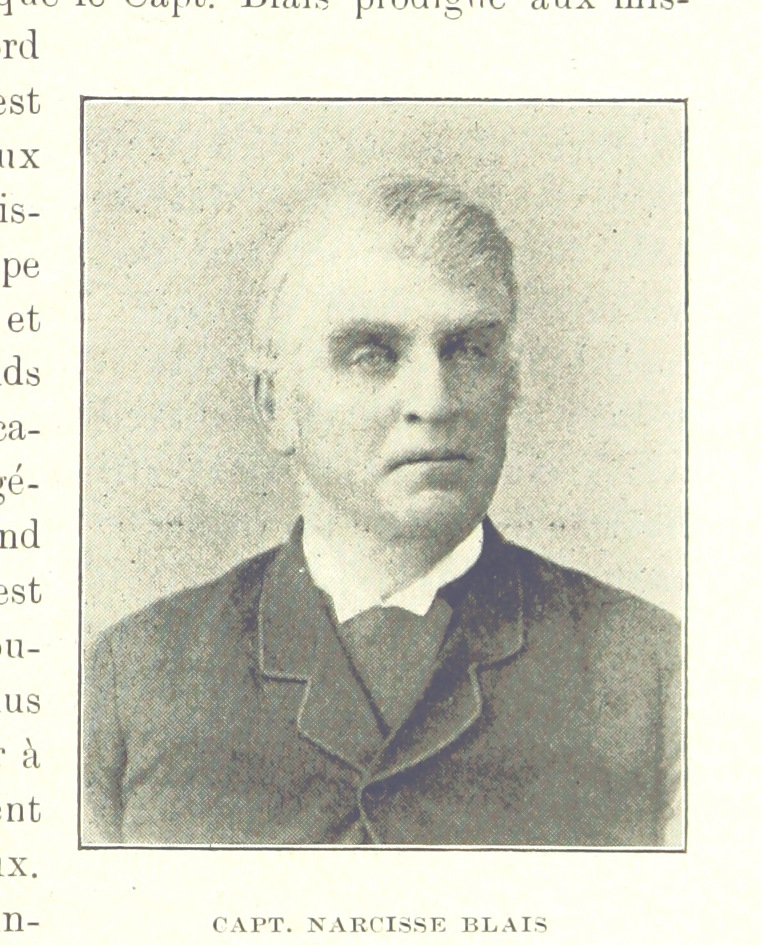

Member of the Legislative Assembly of Quebec for Bagot
- In office 1878–1881
- Preceded by: Flavien Dupont
- Succeeded by: Antoine Casavant

Personal details
- Born: February 13, 1814 Pointe-aux Trembles, Lower Canada
- Died: May 18, 1888 (aged 75) Saint-Pie, Quebec
- Party: Liberal

Narcisse Blais (February 13, 1814 – May 18, 1888) was a farmer and political figure in Quebec. He represented Bagot in the Legislative Assembly of Quebec from 1878 to 1881 as a Liberal member.

He was born in Pointe-aux Trembles, Lower Canada, the son of Gabriel Blais and Marie Beaudry. In 1837, he married Adélaïde Châtillon. Blais was defeated by Antoine Casavant when he ran for reelection in 1881. He died in Saint-Pie at the age of 75.
