= Milton McDonald (politician) =

Canadian politician

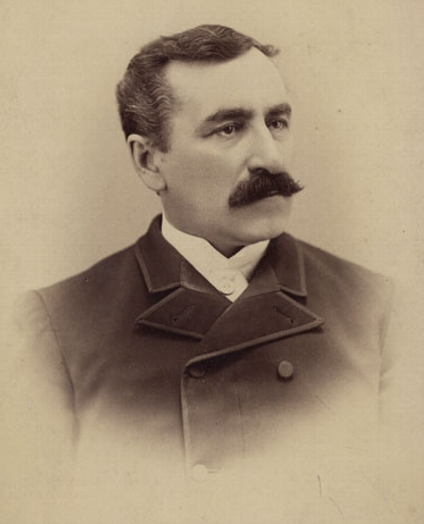

Member of the Legislative Assembly of Quebec for Bagot
- In office 1890–1900
- Preceded by: Joseph Pilon
- Succeeded by: Frédéric-Hector Daigneault

Personal details
- Born: November 21, 1848 Acton Vale, Canada East
- Died: July 18, 1916 (aged 67) Montreal, Quebec
- Party: Conservative

Milton McDonald (November 21, 1848 – July 18, 1916) was a farmer and political figure in Quebec. He represented Bagot in the Legislative Assembly of Quebec from 1890 to 1900 as a Conservative.

He was born in Acton Vale, Canada East, the son of Frank McDonald and Kate Mercure, and was educated in Roxton. McDonald was mayor of Acton Vale and warden for Bagot County. McDonald also was president of the Société d'industrie laitière de la province de Québec and was a member of the Agriculture Council for Quebec from 1893 to 1896. He served as a major in an infantry battalion. McDonald was married three times: first to Joséphine Martin, then to Marie-Louise-Mathilde-Atala Leclerc in 1877 and then to Valérie Desjardins. He died in Montreal at the age of 68.
