= Joseph-Alfred Mousseau =

Premier of Quebec from 1882 to 1884

The Honourable Joseph-Alfred Mousseau PC
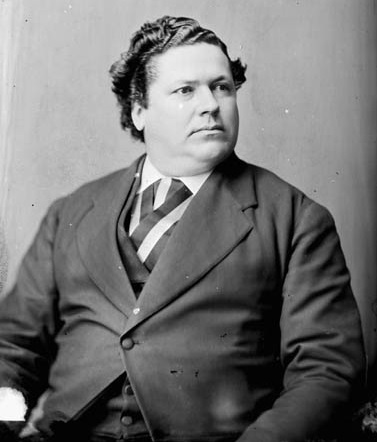

6th Premier of Quebec
- In office July 29, 1882 – January 22, 1884
- Monarch: Victoria
- Lieutenant Governor: Théodore Robitaille
- Preceded by: Joseph-Adolphe Chapleau
- Succeeded by: John Jones Ross

MLA for Jacques-Cartier
- In office August 26, 1882 – January 22, 1884
- Preceded by: Narcisse Lecavalier
- Succeeded by: Arthur Boyer

Member of the Canadian Parliament for Bagot
- In office January 22, 1874 – July 29, 1882
- Preceded by: Pierre-Samuel Gendron
- Succeeded by: Flavien Dupont

Personal details
- Born: July 17, 1837 Sainte-Geneviève-de-Berthier, Lower Canada
- Died: March 30, 1886 (aged 47) Montreal, Quebec, Canada
- Party: Conservative Party of Quebec
- Other political affiliations: Conservative
- Spouse: Hersélie Desrosiers (m. 1862)
- Relations: Joseph Octave Mousseau (brother)
- Cabinet: Attorney General (1882–1884); President of the Privy Council (1880–1881); Secretary of State of Canada (1881–1882)

Joseph-Alfred Mousseau PC (July 17, 1837 – March 30, 1886), was a Canadian lawyer and politician, who served in the federal Cabinet and also as the sixth premier of Quebec.

== Biography ==
He was born in Sainte-Geneviève-de-Berthier, Lower Canada, the son of Louis Mousseau, the son of Alexis Mousseau, and Sophie Duteau, dit Grandpré. Mousseau was first elected to the House of Commons of Canada as a Conservative Member of Parliament in the 1874 election for the riding of Bagot, and was re-elected three times. In 1880, he was elevated to the Cabinet of Prime Minister Sir John A. Macdonald, serving first as president of the Queen's Privy Council of Canada, and then as Secretary of State for Canada.

Exchanging places with Joseph-Adolphe Chapleau, Mousseau left federal politics to become the sixth Premier of the province of Quebec from July 31, 1882. He served until his resignation on January 22, 1884, after being appointed as a puisne judge of the Superior Court for the district of Rimouski. He died in Montreal in 1886.

His brother Joseph Octave Mousseau was also a member of the Canadian House of Commons.

== Electoral record ==
1874 Canadian federal election: Bagot
Party	Candidate	Votes	%	±%
Conservative	Joseph-Alfred Mousseau	1,163		
Unknown	J.B. Bourgeois	1,120		
Source: Canadian Elections Database

1878 Canadian federal election: Bagot
Party	Candidate	Votes	%	±%
Conservative	Joseph-Alfred Mousseau	1,387		
Independent	Chagnon	1,226		
Source: Canadian Elections Database

By-election on appointment of Mr. Mousseau as President of the Council, 20 November 1880
Party	Candidate	Votes	%	±%
Conservative	Joseph-Alfred Mousseau	acclaimed		

1882 Canadian federal election: Bagot
Party	Candidate	Votes	%	±%
Conservative	Joseph-Alfred Mousseau	acclaimed		

== See also ==
- Politics of Quebec
- Timeline of Quebec history
- List of Quebec general elections
