= Antoine Casavant =

Canadian politician

Member of the Legislative Assembly of Quebec for Bagot
- In office 1881–1886
- Preceded by: Narcisse Blais
- Succeeded by: Joseph Pilon

Personal details
- Born: October 20, 1826 Saint-Hyacinthe, Lower Canada
- Died: July 18, 1892 (aged 65) Saint-Dominique, Quebec
- Party: Conservative

Antoine Casavant (October 20, 1826 – July 18, 1892) was a farmer and political figure in Quebec. He represented Bagot in the Legislative Assembly of Quebec from 1881 to 1886 as a Conservative. His name also appears as Antoine Casavant dit Ladébauche.

He was born in Saint-Hyacinthe, Lower Canada, the son of Antoine Casavant dit Ladébauche and Marie Benoît, and was educated at the Séminaire de Saint-Hyacinthe. Casavant served as a captain in the militia, a justice of the peace and a commissioner for the trial of minor causes. He was also president of the agricultural society for Bagot County and a member of the Quebec agricultural council. He helped found a beet sugar plant at Farnham. He was married twice: to Rosalie Piedalue in 1850 and to Marie-Hermine Vachon in 1868. Casavant served on the municipal council for Saint-Dominique. He ran unsuccessfully for the Saint-Hyacinthe seat in the Quebec assembly in 1878 and 1879. Casavant died in Saint-Dominique at the age of 65.
