= Bagot (federal electoral district) =

Former federal electoral district in Quebec, Canada

Coordinates: 45.61608°N 72.82871°W

Quebec electoral district

Defunct federal electoral district
- Legislature: House of Commons
- District created: 1867
- District abolished: 1933
- First contested: 1867
- Last contested: 1930

Bagot was a federal electoral district in Quebec, Canada, that was represented in the House of Commons of Canada from 1867 to 1935.

It was created by the British North America Act, 1867, and was amalgamated into the St. Hyacinthe—Bagot electoral district in 1933.

Bagot initially consisted of part of the Township of Upton, the township of Acton and the parishes of Saint Hugues, Saint Simon, Sainte Rosalie, Saint Dominique, St. Helene, St. Liboire and Saint Pie.

In 1892, it was redefined to consist of the town of Acton, the village of Upton, and the parishes of St. André d'Acton, St. Ephrem d'Upton, Ste. Hélène, St. Hugues, Ste. Rosalie, St. Simon, St. Théodore d'Acton, St. Marcel and St. Dominique, and those parts of the parishes of St. Nazaire and Ste. Christine that were included in the township of Acton.

In 1903, it was redefined to consist of the town of Acton, the village of Upton, and the parishes of St. André d'Acton, St. Ephrem d'Upton, Ste. Hèlène, St. Hugues, St. Liboire, St. Pie, Ste. Rosalie, St. Simon, St. Théodore d'Acton, St. Dominique, St. Nazaire and Ste. Christine.

In 1924, it was redefined to consist of the County of Bagot. The electoral district was abolished in 1933, and incorporated into St. Hyacinthe—Bagot electoral district.

== Members of Parliament ==
This riding has elected the following members of Parliament:

Parliament	Years	Member	Party
Bagot
1st	1867–1872	Pierre-Samuel Gendron	Conservative
2nd	1872–1874	Pierre-Samuel Gendron	Conservative
3rd	1874–1878	Joseph-Alfred Mousseau	Conservative
4th	1878–1880	Joseph-Alfred Mousseau	Conservative
4th	1880–1882	Joseph-Alfred Mousseau	Conservative
5th	1882–1882	Joseph-Alfred Mousseau	Conservative
5th	1882–1887	Flavien Dupont	Conservative
6th	1887–1891	Flavien Dupont	Conservative
7th	1891–1896	Flavien Dupont	Conservative
8th	1896–1898	Flavien Dupont	Conservative
8th	1898–1900	Joseph Edmond Marcile	Liberal
9th	1900–1904	Joseph Edmond Marcile	Liberal
10th	1904–1908	Joseph Edmond Marcile	Liberal
11th	1908–1911	Joseph Edmond Marcile	Liberal
12th	1911–1917	Joseph Edmond Marcile	Liberal
13th	1917–1921	Joseph Edmond Marcile	Opposition (Laurier Liberals)
14th	1921–1925	Joseph Edmond Marcile	Liberal
15th	1925–1925	Joseph Edmond Marcile	Liberal
15th	1925–1926	Georges Dorèze Morin	Liberal
16th	1926–1929	Georges Dorèze Morin	Liberal
16th	1930–1930	Cyrille Dumaine	Liberal
17th	1930–1935	Cyrille Dumaine	Liberal
Riding dissolved into St. Hyacinthe—Bagot

== Election results ==
1867 Canadian federal election
Party	Candidate	Votes
Conservative	Pierre-Samuel Gendron	1,156
Unknown	Maurice Laframboise	889
Source: Canadian Elections Database

1872 Canadian federal election
Party	Candidate	Votes	%	±%
Conservative	Pierre-Samuel Gendron	1,184		
Unknown	Forsyth	4		
Source: Canadian Elections Database

1874 Canadian federal election
Party	Candidate	Votes	%	±%
Conservative	Joseph-Alfred Mousseau	1,163		
Unknown	J.B. Bourgeois	1,120		
Source: Canadian Elections Database

1878 Canadian federal election
Party	Candidate	Votes	%	±%
Conservative	Joseph-Alfred Mousseau	1,387		
Independent	Chagnon	1,226		
Source: Canadian Elections Database

By-election on appointment of Mr. Mousseau as President of the Council, 20 November 1880
Party	Candidate	Votes	%	±%
Conservative	Joseph-Alfred Mousseau	acclaimed		

1882 Canadian federal election
Party	Candidate	Votes	%	±%
Conservative	Joseph-Alfred Mousseau	acclaimed		

By-election on Mr. Mousseau's accepting a seat in the Quebec Cabinet, 12 September 1882
Party	Candidate	Votes	%	±%
Conservative	Flavien Dupont	1,408		
Unknown	O. Desmarais	1,107		

1887 Canadian federal election
Party	Candidate	Votes	%	±%
Conservative	Flavien Dupont	acclaimed		

1891 Canadian federal election
Party	Candidate	Votes	%	±%
Conservative	Flavien Dupont	1,582		
Liberal	J. Pilon	1,529		

1896 Canadian federal election
Party	Candidate	Votes	%	±%
Conservative	Flavien Dupont	acclaimed		

By-election on Mr. Dupont's death, 14 December 1898
Party	Candidate	Votes	%	±%
Liberal	Joseph Edmond Marcile	1,431		
Conservative	L.T. Brodeur	1,384		

1900 Canadian federal election
Party	Candidate	Votes	%	±%
Liberal	Joseph Edmond Marcile	1,605		
Conservative	Louis-Olivier Taillon	1,449		

1904 Canadian federal election
Party	Candidate	Votes	%	±%
Liberal	Joseph Edmond Marcile	1,832		
Conservative	François-Xavier Lajoie	1,489		

1908 Canadian federal election
Party	Candidate	Votes	%	±%
Liberal	Joseph Edmond Marcile	1,884		
Conservative	Victor Sylvestre	1,551		

1911 Canadian federal election
Party	Candidate	Votes	%	±%
Liberal	Joseph Edmond Marcile	1,845		
Conservative	Tancrède Marsil	1,750		

1917 Canadian federal election
Party	Candidate	Votes	%	±%
Opposition	Joseph Edmond Marcile	3,318		
Government	Joseph-Eugène Lafontaine	92		

1921 Canadian federal election
Party	Candidate	Votes	%	±%
Liberal	Joseph Edmond Marcile	4,004		
Unknown	Louis-Homer Marcotte	3,034		
Unknown	Joseph-Aldège Dupuis	48		

1925 Canadian federal election
Party	Candidate	Votes	%	±%
Liberal	Joseph Edmond Marcile	3,571		
Conservative	Guillaume-André Fauteux	2,797		

By-election on Mr. Marcile's death, 7 December 1925
Party	Candidate	Votes	%	±%
Liberal	Georges Dorèze Morin	3,724		
Conservative	Guillaume-André Fauteux	3,225		

1926 Canadian federal election
Party	Candidate	Votes	%	±%
Liberal	Georges Dorèze Morin	3,787		
Conservative	Guillaume-André Fauteux	3,211		

By-election on Mr. Morin's death, 27 January 1930
Party	Candidate	Votes	%	±%
Liberal	Cyrille Dumaine	acclaimed		

1930 Canadian federal election
Party	Candidate	Votes	%	±%
Liberal	Cyrille Dumaine	3,654		
Conservative	Léon Gauthier	3,479		
Source: lop.parl.ca

== See also ==
- List of Canadian electoral districts
- Historical federal electoral districts of Canada
