= Geoffrey Hemming =

World War I flying ace

Geoffrey William Hemming
- Born: 3 April 1898; Droitwich, Worcestershire, England
- Died: 26 February 1926 (aged 27); RAF Calshot, Southampton Water, Hampshire, England
- Military career
- Allegiance: United Kingdom
- Branch: Royal Navy; Royal Air Force
- Service years: 1916–1926
- Rank: Flight lieutenant
- Units: No. 4 Squadron RNAS; No. 480 Flight RAF
- Conflicts: World War I
- Awards: Distinguished Service Cross; Order of the Crown (Belgium); Croix de Guerre (Belgium); Croix de Guerre (France)

Flight Lieutenant Geoffrey William Hemming DSC (3 April 1898 – 26 February 1926) was a British World War I flying ace credited with six aerial victories.

== World War I service ==
Hemming was commissioned as probationary flight sub-lieutenant in the Royal Naval Air Service on 5 July 1916, and posted to HMS President.

He joined No. 4 Naval Squadron just after its second formation in December 1916. It was equipped with Sopwith Pups, and based at Ostend, Belgium. On 12 May 1917 Hemming piloted Pup No. N6177 to victory over a Siemens-Schuckert D.I, destroying it. He switched to No. N6199 for his victories on 6 June, when he destroyed another Siemens Schuckert D.I, and drove a third one down out of control. He then upgraded to Sopwith Camel No. B3841 for his triple win on 22 August 1917, when he drove down three Albatros D.Vs out of control.

Hemming was awarded the Distinguished Service Cross, which was gazetted in November 1917. His citation read:

Flight Sub-Lieutenant Geoffrey William Hemming, R.N.A.S.

"In recognition of his services with a Wing of the R.N.A.S. at Dunkirk between March and September, 1917, during which period he has been continuously employed on the Belgian coast, and on many occasions has been in charge of a flight. On the 22nd September, 1917, he led his flight against a formation of twenty enemy aircraft, and engaging three consecutively, brought them all down".

He was promoted to flight lieutenant on 1 January 1918, and on 22 February he was granted permission to wear the insignia of the Croix de guerre and of a commander of the Order of the Crown, which had been conferred by the King of the Belgians.

On 12 September 1919 Hemming was granted a short service commission in the Royal Air Force with the rank of flying officer.

On 7 August 1924 he was posted to the Marine Aircraft Experimental Establishment at Felixstowe. On 1 January 1925 he was promoted to flight lieutenant, and on 16 February 1925 posted to No. 480 Flight, based at RAF Calshot. Hemming died following a flying accident in a Fairey IIID at Calshot on 26 February 1926. His passenger Flying Officer Robert Collins was seriously injured, and died two days later.

== Personal life ==
Geoffrey Hemming married Dorothy May Woods, daughter of Mr. and Mrs R. J. Woods, of Princetown Lodge, Bangor, County Down, on 7 February 1923 at St. Comgall's Parish Church, Bangor, County Down.
