= Carl Hau =

German lawyer and murderer

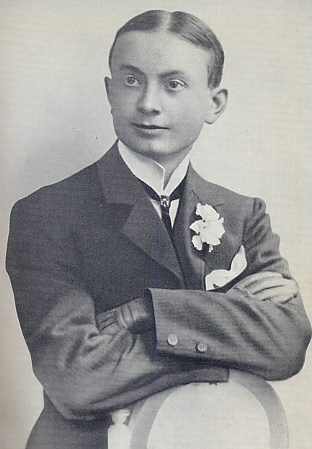
Carl Hau

Carl Hau (or Karl Hau; 3 February 1881 – 5 February 1926) was a German lawyer found guilty of murdering his mother-in-law. His sensational trial in 1907 sparked the Hau Riot, the biggest street riot of its kind in German history.

== Life ==
Hau was born on 3 February 1881 in Grosslittgen near Wittlich in south-west Germany close to the Luxembourg border. His father Johan Baptist Hau was a bank director. Carl's mother died when he was three. He was educated in Trier.

He was studying Law at the University of Freiburg when in 1901 he contracted tuberculosis which was widespread in Europe at that time. He went to the Mediterranean island of Corsica to recover in the Spring of 1901, taking rooms in the pretty town of Ajaccio on the island's west coast. During this stay he met a widow, Josephina Molitor (née Stadelhofer), a mother of seven children, who was there with her two youngest daughters, Lina (25) and Olga (19). The group started going for walks together and both daughters liked Hau, who was very polite.

Lina had to go home to Baden Baden in south-west Germany and Hau offered to escort her. Hau was six years her junior, and if any "match-making" had been intended by Mrs Molitor, it was with Olga rather than Lina, as Carl and Olga were the same age.

In June 1901 Carl and Lina ran off together to Switzerland taking 2000 marks from her savings. An incident occurred in Realp at some time in the summer in which Lina was shot in the chest, but this was said to be part of a suicide pact. On recovery, in August 1901, Mrs Molitor allowed them to marry. This took place on 18 August in Mannheim. The couple moved to the US and settled in Washington D. C. where Hau resumed his studies in Law and graduated BA in 1904 and was admitted to the bar early in 1906. Some American newspapers list him as a professor at George Washington University.

In 1904 he obtained a post as Secretary to the Turkish Consul in Washington, Hermann Schoenfeld, which required a trip to Istanbul which involved a journey through Europe. His task was to promote the Louisiana Purchase Exposition and the State Fair of 1904.

Lina received a large allowance from the estate of her late father which was set up to be paid annually. In 1905 Lina asked (at Carl's request) that the whole amount be paid as a lump sum.

In 1906 Carl had to make a second trip to Turkey and he suggested that Lena and their young daughter spend some time with her mother in Baden Baden while he was in Istanbul and they could then all spend time together when he had finished. This was organised but there were worries that Carl was getting too close to the sister Olga. Nevertheless, Lina, Olga and Carl went on a holiday together to Paris, staying at the world famous Hotel Regina close to the Louvre, with rooms overlooking the Tuileries Gardens. The stay began on 25 October 1906. On Monday 29 October Mrs Molitor received a telegram in Baden Baden telling her that she should come quickly to Paris as Olga was sick. She went but found no one ill. She thought perhaps someone wanted her to leave the house in Baden Baden. Mrs Molitor returned to Baden Baden with Olga. Carl, Lina and their young daughter went on a visit to London which he wished to see before going back to the USA. They stayed at the impressive Hotel Cecil.

== Murder ==
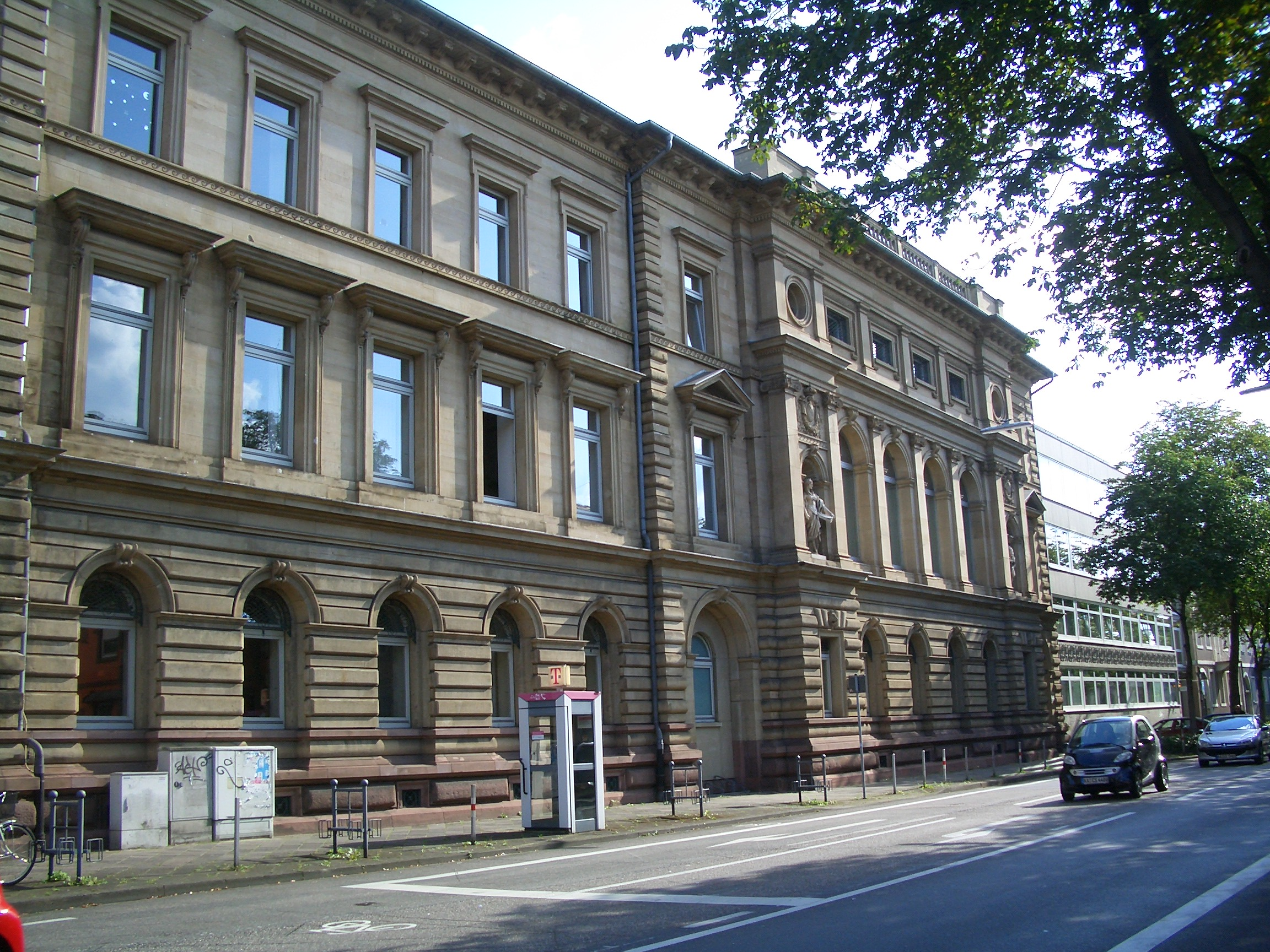
The courtroom in Karlsruhe, site of the Hau Riot

In London, Carl purchased several specific items: a wig, a false beard, a black hat and a long black coat. He possibly also purchased a revolver. He sent a telegram to himself in the name of the Standard Oil Company requiring him to go to Berlin immediately. Excusing himself to Lina he left London, arriving in Frankfurt am Main on 3 November. He had no intention of going to Berlin, but Berlin is much further from Baden Baden. He told Lina the meeting had been moved from Berlin to Frankfurt. He threw away the false beard he got in London and got a new one matching the hair colour of the wig. However, several witnesses who saw him on 6 November were drawn to remember him mainly because of the false beard.

On Tuesday 6 November 1906 he went to Baden Baden in disguise. He telephoned Mrs Molitor's house at 5.20pm and the maid answered. He said he was from the Baden Baden Post Office and asked that Mrs Molitor come to the Post Office as they had found a copy of the telegram which she had complained about. Despite the maid telling Mrs Molitor that the voice sounded like Carl Hau she nevertheless headed out at 5.45 to the Post Office, taking Olga with her, going into the dark streets. The women became aware of a man following them. When they paused and turned he shot Mrs Molitor dead. His motivation appears to be the inheritance (via Lina) of the outstanding family fortune.

Carl fled into the darkness and disposed of his disguise. He returned to his hotel in London. The police arrested him at the hotel a few days later and returned him to Germany for trial.

== Trial ==
Hau was imprisoned at Karlsruhe. His wife and daughter returned to Germany and Lina visited him in prison. She discovered he had spent all her inheritance and she eventually concluded that he had indeed killed her mother. She took a train to Zürich in Switzerland and drowned herself in Pfaffikersee Lake, leaving a note asking that her daughter change her name to avoid the shame brought on the family. American papers accused the German officials of torturing Hau to extract a confession in the time before the trial.

The trial took place in Karlsruhe Regional Court in July 1907. Carl pled not guilty and all evidence was circumstantial. Carl's father employed Eduard Dietz to defend his son. Prosecution was led by Mr Bleicher and the trial was presided over by Judge Eller. The only thing he admitted was sending the telegram to Mrs Molitor asking her to come to Paris and sending the telegram to himself in London telling him of a business issue requiring his attendance in Germany. Both of these he excused on other motivations. One press theory was that Olga had shot her own mother to be with Carl. The offending editor, Albert Herzog, received a prison sentence of one year for this libel. When the guilty verdict was announced on 22 July it sparked a street riot of 20,000 people outside the courtroom (possibly contrived by Carl and/or Lina) which had to be quelled by military force. The initial group of at least 70 soldiers could not cope and were joined by two companies of grenadiers under command of Captain Ferdinand von Notz. The riot was not subdued until the following morning.

Carl was found guilty in 1907 but was wealthy enough (via Lena) to afford a series of lengthy appeals and in December his death sentence was commuted to life imprisonment. The first 12 years were spent in solitary confinement. He was released in September 1924 having served 17 years. However, he then published two books concerning the murder and imprisonment breaching the terms of his release (he was released on probation) and undermining the original argument which let him escape execution. One was called Das Todesurteil (the Death Sentence) the other was Lifelong, both published in 1925. A warrant was issued on 27 November 1925 for his re-arrest and he had to go on the run. Given his training as a lawyer he should have realised the potential gravity of his confessional books.

On 5 February 1926 he committed suicide by shooting himself in the head while in an abandoned house in Tivoli near Rome in Italy.

== Recognition ==
The director Lupu Pick made the first film of the story. The film, released in 1925, was released initially only for adult viewing and was banned altogether in 1926.

The story has been subject of film, theatre and novels for a hundred years. In 2019 the Baden Baden Theatre created a play based on Hau's own book.

== Family ==
Lina and Carl had a daughter, Olga, born in 1903 in Washington. She was adopted following her mother's suicide and emigrated to the US in 1925. Olga renamed herself Ruth Dorothee Masters, later who later married Admiral Hyman G. Rickover.
