= Municipal history of Quebec =

The Municipal history of Quebec started in 1796 with the creation of administrations for Montréal and Quebec City, continuing to today. For detail on individual periods of the history, see one of the following articles:

- Pre-20th-century municipal history of Quebec
- 20th-century municipal history of Quebec
- 21st-century municipal history of Quebec

== See also ==
- History of Quebec
