= Joseph Edmond Marcile =

Canadian politician

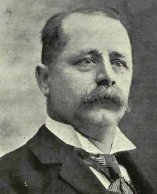

Member of the Canadian Parliament for Bagot
- In office 1898–1925
- Preceded by: Flavien Dupont
- Succeeded by: Georges Dorèze Morin

Personal details
- Born: October 22, 1854 Contrecœur, Canada East
- Died: November 5, 1925 (aged 71)
- Party: Liberal

Joseph Edmond Marcile (October 22, 1854 – November 5, 1925) was a Canadian politician.

Born in Contrecœur, Canada East, Marcile was educated at the Acton Vale Model School. A merchant, he was a city councillor and mayor of Acton Vale, Quebec. He was first elected to the House of Commons of Canada for the Quebec electoral district of Bagot in an 1898 by-election held after the death of the sitting MP, Flavien Dupont. A Liberal, he would remain undefeated in the following seven elections and serve for almost 27 years until dying in office in 1925.

== Electoral record ==
By-election on Mr. Dupont's death, 14 December 1898
| Party | Candidate | Votes | % | ±% |
|---|---|---|---|---|
| Liberal | Joseph-Edmond Marcile | 1,431 | | |
| Conservative | L.T. Brodeur | 1,384 | | |

1900 Canadian federal election: Bagot
| Party | Candidate | Votes | % | ±% |
|---|---|---|---|---|
| Liberal | Joseph Edmond Marcile | 1,605 | | |
| Conservative | Louis-Olivier Taillon | 1,449 | | |

1904 Canadian federal election: Bagot
| Party | Candidate | Votes | % | ±% |
|---|---|---|---|---|
| Liberal | Joseph Edmond Marcile | 1,832 | | |
| Conservative | François-Xavier Lajoie | 1,489 | | |

1908 Canadian federal election: Bagot
| Party | Candidate | Votes | % | ±% |
|---|---|---|---|---|
| Liberal | Joseph Edmond Marcile | 1,884 | | |
| Conservative | Victor Sylvestre | 1,551 | | |

1911 Canadian federal election: Bagot
| Party | Candidate | Votes | % | ±% |
|---|---|---|---|---|
| Liberal | Joseph Edmond Marcile | 1,845 | | |
| Conservative | Tancrède Marsil | 1,750 | | |

1917 Canadian federal election: Bagot
| Party | Candidate | Votes | % | ±% |
|---|---|---|---|---|
| Opposition | Joseph Edmond Marcile | 3,318 | | |
| Government | Joseph-Eugène Lafontaine | 92 | | |

1921 Canadian federal election: Bagot
| Party | Candidate | Votes | % | ±% |
|---|---|---|---|---|
| Liberal | Joseph Edmond Marcile | 4,004 | | |
| Unknown | Louis-Homer Marcotte | 3,034 | | |
| Unknown | Joseph-Aldège Dupuis | 48 | | |

1925 Canadian federal election: Bagot
| Party | Candidate | Votes | % | ±% |
|---|---|---|---|---|
| Liberal | Joseph Edmond Marcile | 3,571 | | |
| Conservative | Guillaume-André Fauteux | 2,797 | | |
