= Georges Dorèze Morin =

Canadian politician

Member of Parliament for Bagot
- In office December 1925 – December 1929
- Preceded by: Joseph Edmond Marcile
- Succeeded by: Cyrille Dumaine

Personal details
- Born: Georges Dorèze Morin; 2 December 1884 Saint-Hyacinthe, Quebec, Canada
- Died: 24 December 1929 (aged 45) Saint-Pie-de-Bagot, Quebec, Canada
- Party: Liberal
- Spouse(s): Evelyn M. Morin m. 8 February 1910
- Profession: Notary

Georges Dorèze Morin (2 December 1884 – 24 December 1929) was a Liberal party member of the House of Commons of Canada. He was born in Saint-Hyacinthe, Quebec and became a notary.

He was first elected to Parliament at the Bagot riding in a by-election on 7 December 1925. Morin was re-elected there in 1926.

Morin died unexpectedly on 24 December 1929 at Saint-Pie-de-Bagot, Quebec, before the end of his term in the 16th Canadian Parliament.

By-election on Mr. Marcile's death, 7 December 1925
Party	Candidate	Votes	%	±%
Liberal	Georges Dorèze Morin	3,724		
Conservative	Guillaume-André Fauteux	3,225		

1926 Canadian federal election: Bagot
Party	Candidate	Votes	%	±%
Liberal	Georges Dorèze Morin	3,787		
Conservative	Guillaume-André Fauteux	3,211		
