= List of members of the Canadian House of Commons with military service (Y) =

Name	Elected party	Constituency	Elected date	Military service
John Young	Liberal	Montreal West	October 12, 1872	Militia
Newton Manly Young	Conservative	Toronto Northeast	September 14, 1926	Canadian Army
Rodney Young	Cooperative Commonwealth Federation	Vancouver Centre	June 8, 1948	Canadian Army
William Yurko	Progressive Conservative	Edmonton East	May 22, 1979	Royal Canadian Air Force (1944-1949)
