= Green Party of Canada candidates in the 2000 Canadian federal election =

The Green Party of Canada fielded several candidates in the 2000 federal election, none of whom was elected. Information about these candidates may be found on this page.

== Ontario ==
=== Doug Howat (Eglinton—Lawrence) ===
Doug Howat was a student at Northern Secondary School at the time of the election. He received 688 votes (1.66%), finishing fifth against Liberal incumbent Joe Volpe.

=== Thomas Gerry (Sudbury) ===
Thomas Gerry was 52 years old at the time of the election, and worked as a professor of Canadian Literature at Laurentian University. He favoured a shorter work week, and argued that Canada should shift its tax burden from small independent businesses to large national and multinational corporations. Gerry received 503 votes (1.45%), finishing fifth against Liberal incumbent Diane Marleau.

Gerry is the author of Contemporary Canadian and U.S. women of letters : an annotated bibliography. He attended the Summit of the Americas protest at Quebec City in April 2001.
