= 1948 Progressive Conservative leadership convention =

1948 Progressive Conservative Party leadership election
- October 2, 1948
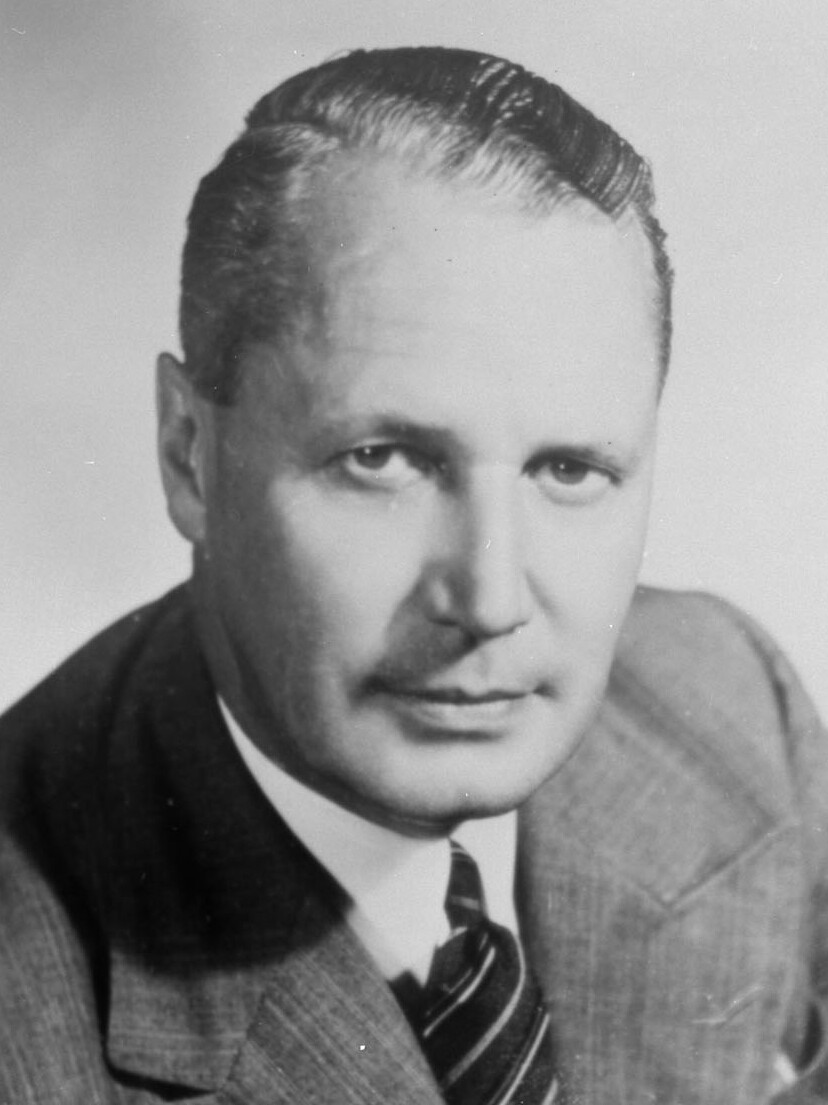

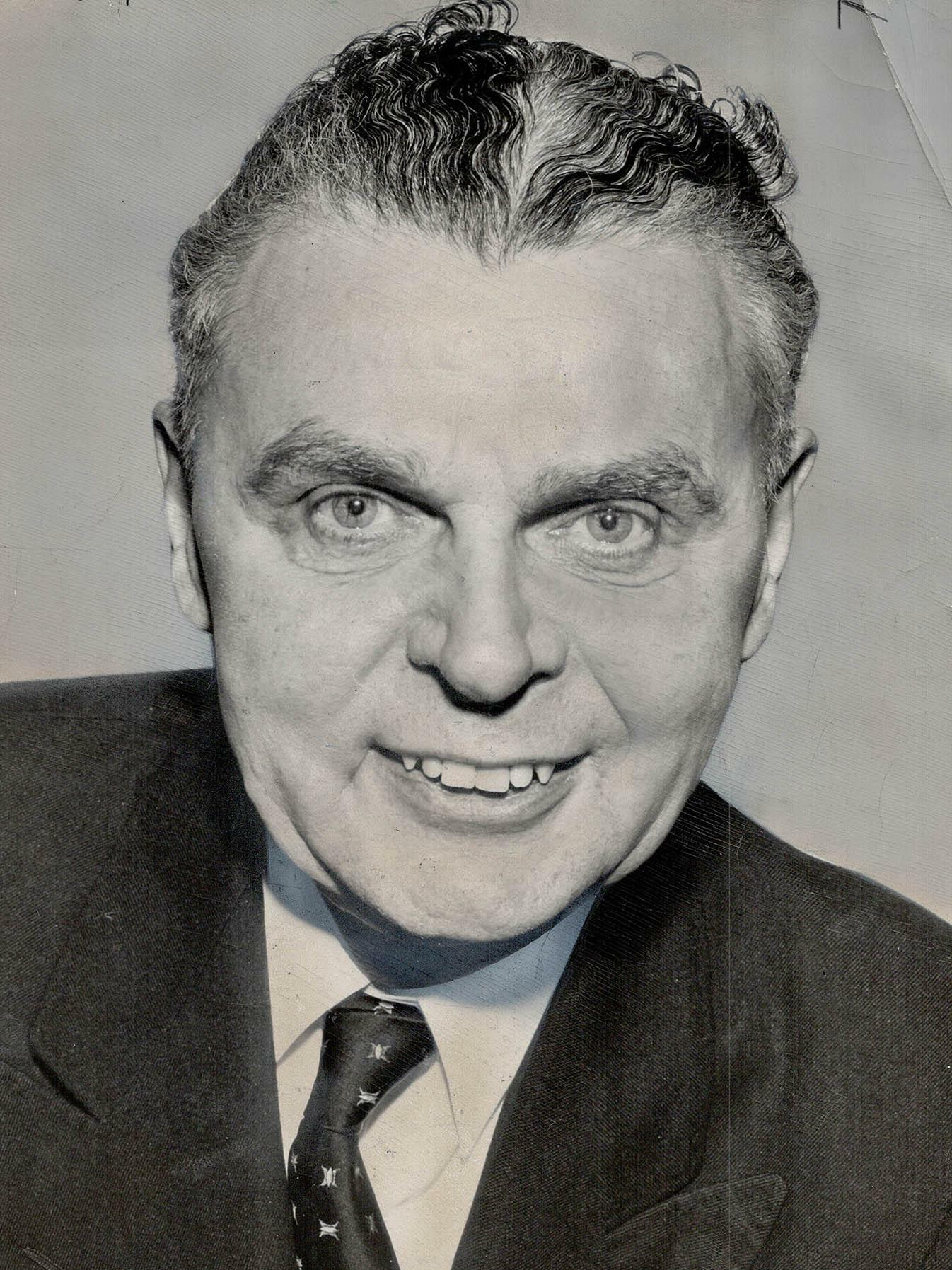

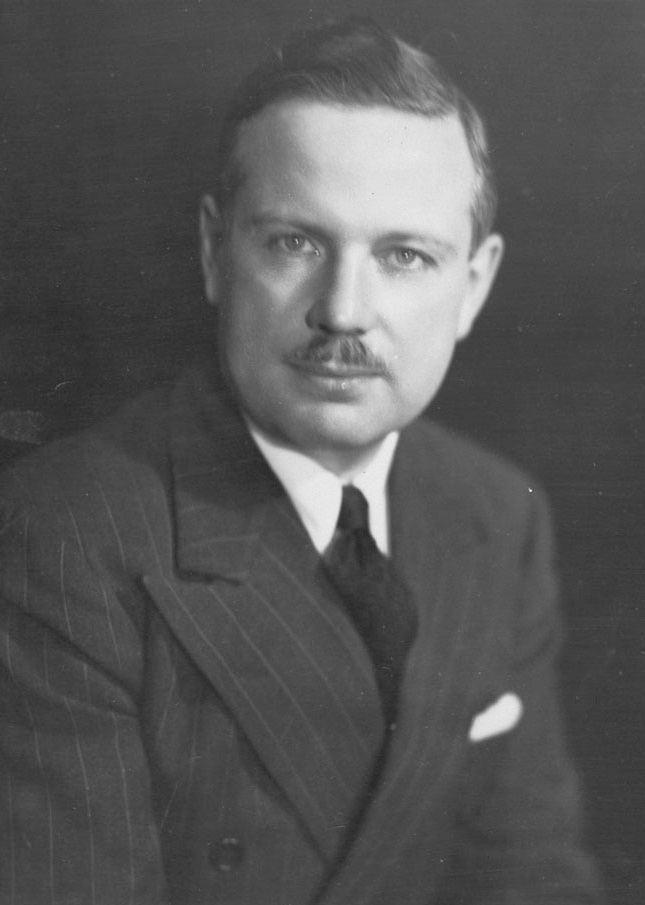
Candidate	George A. Drew	John Diefenbaker	Donald Fleming
Delegate count	827	311	104
Percentage	66.7%	25.0%	8.4%
Leader before election
John Bracken
Elected Leader
George A. Drew

1948 Progressive Conservative leadership election
- Date: October 2, 1948
- Convention: Ottawa Coliseum, Lansdowne Park; Ottawa, Ontario
- Resigning leader: John Bracken
- Won by: George A. Drew
- Ballots: 1
- Candidates: 3
- Entrance fee: C$?
- Spending limit: None

The 1948 Progressive Conservative leadership election was held to choose a leader for the Progressive Conservative Party of Canada. The convention was held at the Ottawa Coliseum in Ottawa, Ontario, Canada. Voting occurred on October 2, 1948. Premier of Ontario George A. Drew was elected as the party's new leader. The National Film Board of Canada made a short film about the event for its Eye Witness series.

== Background ==
John Bracken had been leader of the party since 1942 but did not enter parliament until the 1945 federal election in which the Liberal government was re-elected despite an increase in seats for the Progressive Conservatives. Their seat increase largely took place in Ontario, and was credited to the provincial government led by Drew; Bracken, having been generally viewed as an outsider since he became leader, quickly came under pressure to resign and make way for Drew, but he refused to do so, and Drew himself was initially reluctant to step away from his role as Premier. However, Drew unexpectedly lost his seat in the Ontario legislature in the 1948 provincial election, which opened up an obvious opportunity for him to make the move to Parliament Hill. With over two-thirds of the Tory federal caucus representing Ontario ridings, Bracken recognized that his position was now untenable, and resigned as leader.

== Candidates ==
- George A. Drew, 54, had been Premier of Ontario since 1943.
- John Diefenbaker, 53, the Member of Parliament (MP) for Lake Centre, Saskatchewan since 1940, announced his second bid for the leadership having run unsuccessfully in 1942. He had support from western delegates but was unpopular in Quebec.
- Donald Fleming, 43, MP for the Toronto riding of Eglinton since 1945

Grey North (Ontario) MP W. Garfield Case ended his candidacy before the convention to support Drew.

== Convention ==
Policies considered by delegates included tax relief, a ban on communist activities, abolishing an annual $2.50 radio licence fee, reducing the cost of government, strengthened defence, a long-term immigration policy, a national flag, and a national library.

Drew's speech to delegates received more applause than Diefenbaker's. The Ontario premier called for stronger ties between Quebec and English Canada, warned against centralization of power in Ottawa and favoured personal initiative, saving, and security.

Fleming warned of the "cancer of Communism in our midst (that) must be fought without quarter by every democratic weapon open to a free people" and accused the Liberals of surrendering to socialist economics. He argued that Quebec was essential for the party's success.

Diefenbaker said the party needed more support from what he called the "forgotten man" arguing that "They want leadership that will assert that decent living cannot come from government handouts; they know that government cannot take the place of fundamental virtues of honest, thrift, hard work, tolerance and sympathy... I believe that progress can be achieved by free enterprise rather than through the muddling interference of bureaucrats."

== Results ==
Whereas the party's previous leadership conventions had for the most part been highly contested, few expected this convention to be anything other than a coronation for Drew, and indeed, this proved to be largely the case despite an energetic campaign from Diefenbaker. In the end, while Diefenbaker was able to attract some support from the west, Drew scored an overwhelming victory on the first ballot.

First Ballot
Candidate	Delegate Count	Percentage
George A. Drew	827	66.6%
John Diefenbaker	311	25.0%
Donald Fleming	104	8.4%
Total	1,242	100%

Wilfrid Garfield Case announced his candidacy but withdrew before the convention to support Drew.
