= James Domville =

Canadian politician (1842–1921)

The Hon. James Domville
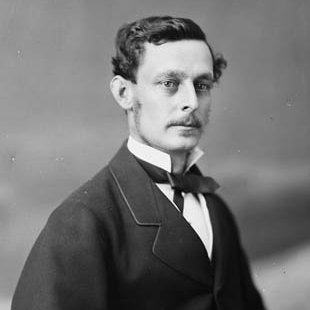

Member of the Canadian Parliament for King's
- In office 1872–1882
- Preceded by: George Ryan
- Succeeded by: George Eulas Foster
- In office 1896–1900
- Preceded by: George Eulas Foster
- Succeeded by: George William Fowler

Senator for Rothesay, New Brunswick
- In office April 20, 1903 – July 30, 1921
- Appointed by: Wilfrid Laurier

Personal details
- Born: November 29, 1842 Belize, British Honduras (Belize)
- Died: July 30, 1921 (aged 78) Rothesay, New Brunswick, Canada
- Party: Liberal (1896–1921); Conservative (1872–1882)

James Domville (November 29, 1842 – July 30, 1921) was a Canadian businessman, militia officer and politician.

== Biography ==
Domville was the son of a British major-general, also named James Domville. In 1858 James, Jr., went to Barbados, where his father commanded a regiment. He was educated at the Royal Military Academy and rose to the rank of lieutenant-colonel in the New Brunswick militia, commanding the 8th Princess Louise New Brunswick Hussars Cavalry Regiment.

Domville was involved in a great number of business interests. He imported tea and other goods from the British West Indies. He was invested in iron works, rolling mills, and nail factories. Domville was also a member of the board of Globe Mutual Life Assurance and of Stadacona Fire and Life Insurance, and director and president of Maritime Bank of the Dominion of Canada. He was a member of the council of the Dominion Artillery Association, a fellow of the Royal Colonial Institute, London, was president of the Kings County Board of Trade, and was chairman of the delegation from Saint John, at the Dominion Board of Trade, Ottawa, in 1871.

Domville represented King's in the House of Commons of Canada from 1872 to 1882 as a Conservative. Domville came to disagree with his party's protectionist policies – a matter which led to a physical confrontation with caucus-mate Arthur Hill Gillmor. These policies were unpopular enough with his constituents that he lost his seat in 1882, leading to his split with the Conservative Party of Sir John A. Macdonald. He would run several times unsuccessfully as an independent candidate, but when he returned to parliament from 1896 to 1900 it was as a Liberal.

Domville was also a Saint John city alderman for a time, during which he was instrumental in the establishment of the city's public library. In 1903 he was appointed to the Senate by Wilfrid Laurier, where he served until his death.

== Electoral record ==
1872 Canadian federal election: King's
Party	Candidate	Votes
Conservative	James Domville	1,507
Unknown	L.N. Sharp	1,044
Unknown	J.E.B. McCready	657
Source: Canadian Elections Database

1874 Canadian federal election: King's
Party	Candidate	Votes
Conservative	James Domville	1,651
Independent	J.E.B. McCready	1,389
lop.parl.ca

1878 Canadian federal election: King's
Party	Candidate	Votes
Conservative	James Domville	1,786
Independent	L.N. Sharp	1,452

1882 Canadian federal election: King's
Party	Candidate	Votes
Conservative	George Eulas Foster	1,536
Conservative	James Domville	1,465

By-election: On election being declared void

By-election on 7 November 1882
Party	Candidate	Votes
Conservative	George Eulas Foster	2,005
Conservative	James Domville	1,723

By-election: On Mr. Foster's acceptance of the office of Minister of Marine and Fisheries

By-election on 31 December 1885
Party	Candidate	Votes
Conservative	George Eulas Foster
Independent Conservative	James Domville

1887 Canadian federal election: King's
Party	Candidate	Votes
Conservative	George Eulas Foster	2,237
Independent	James Domville	1,762

1891 Canadian federal election: King's
Party	Candidate	Votes
Conservative	George Eulas Foster	1,931
Independent	James Domville	1,858

1896 Canadian federal election: King's
Party	Candidate	Votes
Liberal	James Domville	2,389
Conservative	F.E. Morton	1,874

1900 Canadian federal election: King's
Party	Candidate	Votes
Conservative	George William Fowler	2,566
Liberal	James Domville	2,383

== See also ==
- Domville Building
