= Richard Langton Baker =

Canadian politician (1870–1951)

Member of Parliament for Toronto Northeast
- In office 1925–1926
- Preceded by: riding was created in 1924 from parts of Toronto North and York South
- Succeeded by: Newton Manly Young

Member of Parliament for Eglinton
- In office 1930–1935
- Preceded by: Newton Manly Young
- Succeeded by: electoral district was abolished in 1933 when it was redistributed between Eglinton, Rosedale, Spadina and St. Paul's
- In office 1935–1940
- Preceded by: riding was created in 1933 from parts of Toronto Northeast riding
- Succeeded by: Frederick George Hoblitzell

Personal details
- Born: May 15, 1870 Strathroy, Ontario, Canada
- Died: January 3, 1951 (aged 80) Toronto, Ontario, Canada
- Party: Conservative
- Spouse: Susan McLellan (m. 1892)
- Children: 3
- Profession: manufacturer

Richard Langton Baker (May 15, 1870 – January 3, 1951) was a Canadian politician.

== Early life ==
Richard Langton Baker was born on May 15, 1870, in Strathroy, Ontario, Canada, to Sarah Helena (née Wheaton) and Richard Baker. His paternal grandparents were of Yorkshire descent and his maternal grandparents were of United Empire Loyalist descent. At the age of 15, Baker swept floors at a store in Strathroy.

== Career ==
Baker established the Richard L. Baker Company in 1897 and served as its president. He was elected to the House of Commons of Canada in 1925 as a Member of the historical Conservative Party in the riding of Toronto Northeast. He was defeated in the same riding in 1926, but, won again in 1930. He was elected in the riding of Eglinton in 1935 and defeated in 1940 as a member of the National Government coalition.

Baker was active in the dry goods manufacturing business for 60 years. He was president of St. Catharines Silk Mills and the London Hosiery Mills. He was president of the North Toronto Conservative Association, the South York Conservative Association and the North Toronto Ratepayers Association.

== Personal life ==
Baker married Susan McLellan, daughter of professor James A. McLellan, in 1892. They had three daughters, Beatrice, Victoria and Dorothy. Baker lived in Toronto and spent summers at Silver Island on Lake Rosseau in Muskoka.

Baker died at Toronto General Hospital on January 3, 1951.
