= 1956 Progressive Conservative leadership convention =

1956 Progressive Conservative Party leadership election
- December 13–14, 1956

1,284 delegates 643 delegate votes needed to win
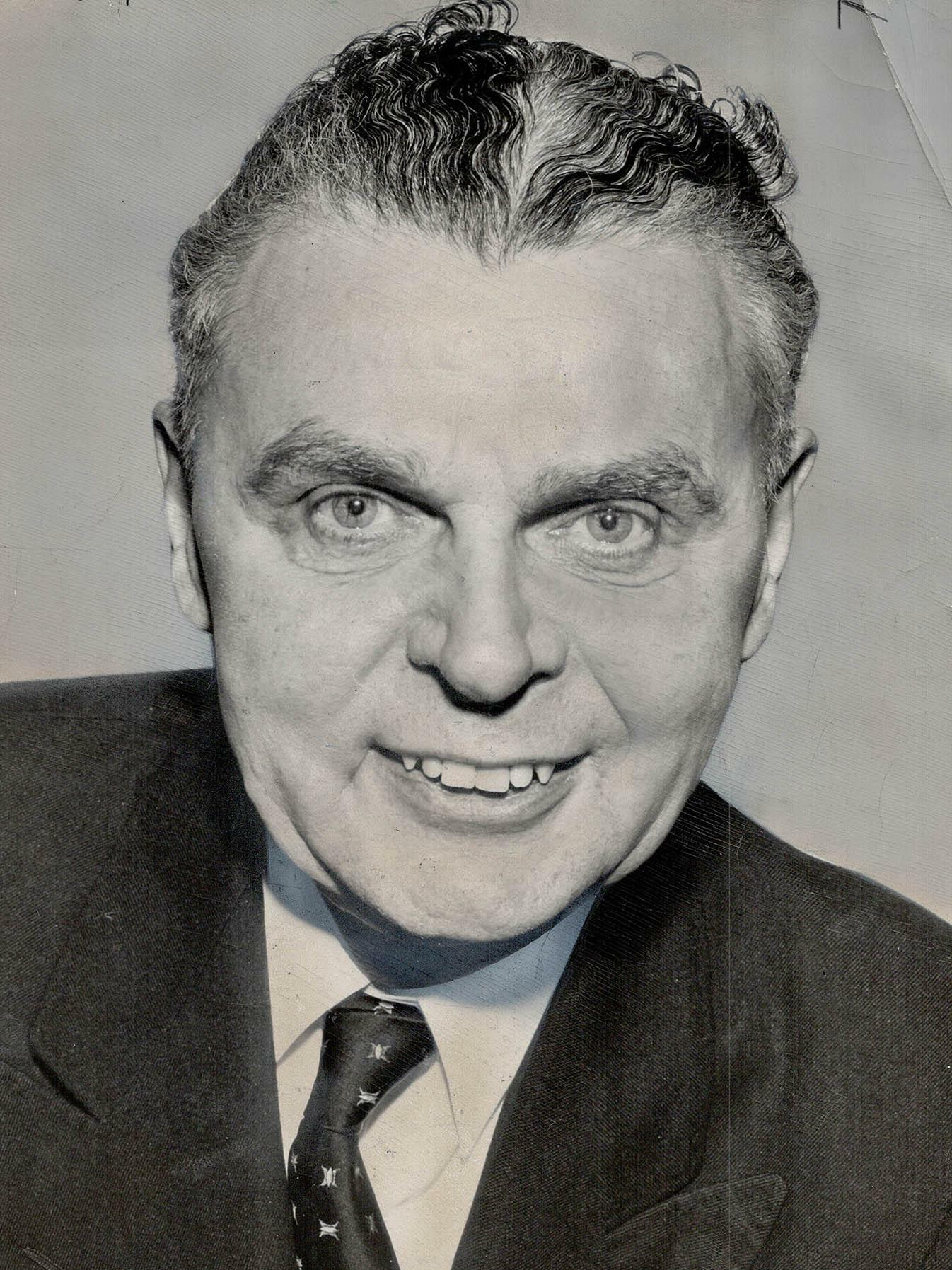

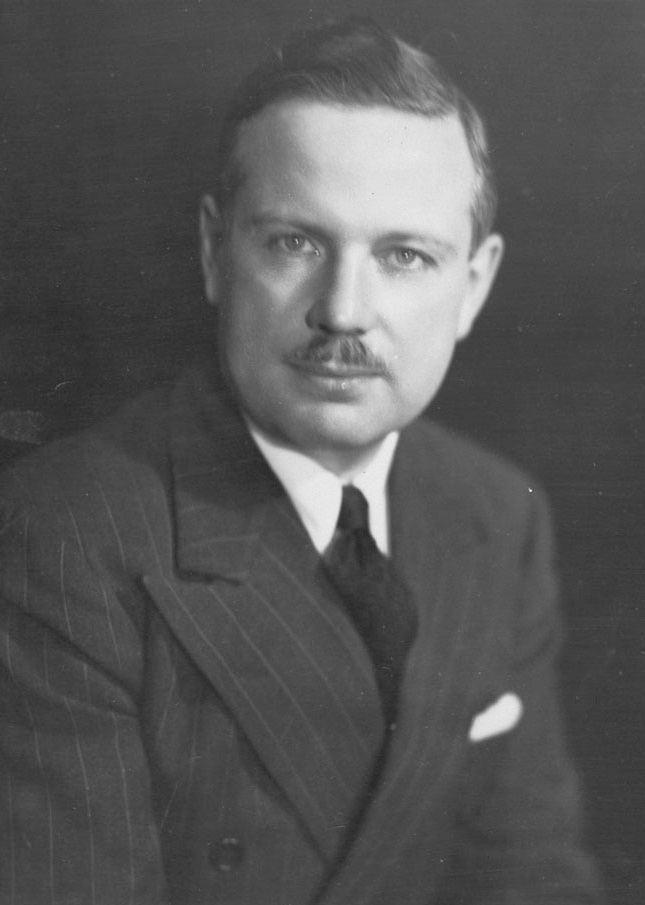

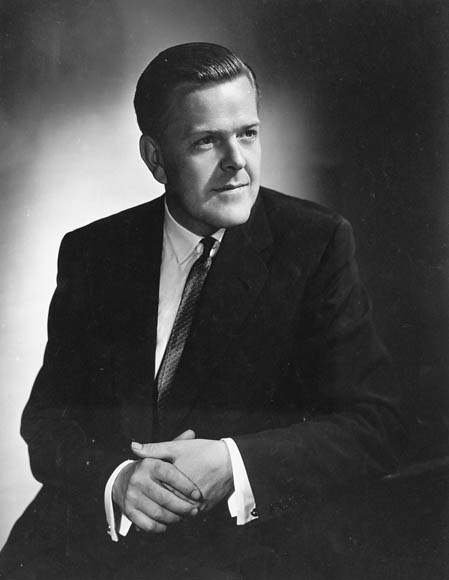
Candidate	John Diefenbaker	Donald Fleming	Davie Fulton
Delegate count	774	393	117
Percentage	60.3%	30.6%	9.1%
Leader before election
William Earl Rowe (interim)
Elected Leader
John Diefenbaker

1956 Progressive Conservative leadership election
- Date: December 13–14, 1956
- Convention: Ottawa Coliseum, Lansdowne Park, Ottawa, Ontario
- Resigning leader: George A. Drew
- Won by: John Diefenbaker
- Ballots: 1
- Candidates: 3
- Spending limit: None

The 1956 Progressive Conservative leadership election was held to choose a leader for the Progressive Conservative Party of Canada. The convention was held at the Ottawa Coliseum in Ottawa, Ontario, Canada. The convention began on December 13, 1956, with voting occurring on December 14 when John Diefenbaker was elected the new leader.

== Background ==
The ailing George A. Drew had taken a leave of absence from his duties as Leader of the Opposition for much of 1956 due to a nearly fatal attack of meningitis. After eight years as party leader, he resigned in the fall of 1956, and a leadership convention was announced for December in Ottawa.

== Candidates ==
- John Diefenbaker, 61, the Member of Parliament (MP) for Lake Centre and then Prince Albert, Saskatchewan since 1940, announced his third bid for the leadership having run unsuccessfully in 1942 and 1948.
- Donald Fleming, 51, MP for the Toronto riding of Eglinton since 1945, had run in the 1948 leadership election.
- E. Davie Fulton, 40, MP for Kamloops, British Columbia since 1945, was running for leadership for the first time.

=== Declined ===
- John Borden Hamilton, 43, MP for the Toronto-area riding of York West since a 1954 by-election, considered running but decided against it.
- George Hees, 46, MP for Broadview since 1950, took soundings about a run, but ultimately dropped out and supported Diefenbaker.
- William Earl Rowe, 62, MP for Dufferin—Simcoe since 1925, and the party's interim leader since Drew's resignation. Though there was some speculation that he might seek to remain as permanent leader until the next federal election, he publicly disclaimed a leadership run before the convention, and quietly supported Fleming's campaign.
- Sidney Earle Smith, 59, President of the University of Toronto since 1945. While several prominent Tories sounded him out about the possibility of running, he decided he had too little experience of electoral politics to run for such a prominent position.

== Convention ==
The convention was opened by Ottawa mayor Charlotte Whitton with Nova Scotia Premier Robert Stanfield, a future party leader, giving the keynote address.

Diefenbaker was nominated by New Brunswick Premier Hugh John Flemming and British Columbia MP George Pearkes. Diefenbaker's failure to have a French speaker as one of his nominees reportedly hurt him with Quebec delegates. They held a meeting and considered supporting one of Diefenbaker's opponents en masse, of which Fleming hoped to be the beneficiary.

The convention supported policies to extend funding for veterans who lacked pensions, a health insurance plan, a new Canadian flag, tax cuts, subsidies for wheat exports, support for NATO and the United Nations, and to remove the responsibilities for broadcast regulation from the Canadian Broadcasting Corporation and instead create an independent regulator. An attempt to remove the word "Progressive" from the party's name was rejected.

== Voting ==
At the time of Drew's resignation, none of the three ultimately-declared candidates enjoyed the universal support of the party's membership; Diefenbaker's western populist stances were seen by some as too reminiscent of those of unpopular former leader John Bracken, Fleming had been a harsh critic of Drew (who was still personally well-liked among much of the party), hurting his support in his native Ontario. At the same time, Fulton was generally considered too inexperienced to be a serious contender. Still, after late attempts to draft interim leader William Earl Rowe and the University of Toronto president Sidney Smith failed, Diefenbaker emerged as the clear favourite due to his being the most experienced of the three candidates and for mounting an energetic speaking campaign across the country.

As expected, the western provinces heavily favoured Diefenbaker, while Quebec backed Fleming. Ontario was thus left as the key vote. While Drew could probably have swung the vote of his native province, and thereby victory towards either of the two frontrunners (while the unofficial tradition was for outgoing Tory leaders to remain neutral in the leadership contest to succeed them, Drew still held considerable influence behind the scenes), he ultimately did not do so. The Ontario vote thus came down behind Diefenbaker, earning him a decisive victory on the first ballot.

First Ballot
Candidate	Delegate Count	Percentage
DIEFENBAKER, John George	774	60.3%
FLEMING, Donald Methuen	393	30.6%
FULTON, Edmund Davie	117	9.1%
Total	1,284	100%
