= George Eulas Foster =

Canadian politician

The Right Honourable Sir George Eulas Foster PC GCMG
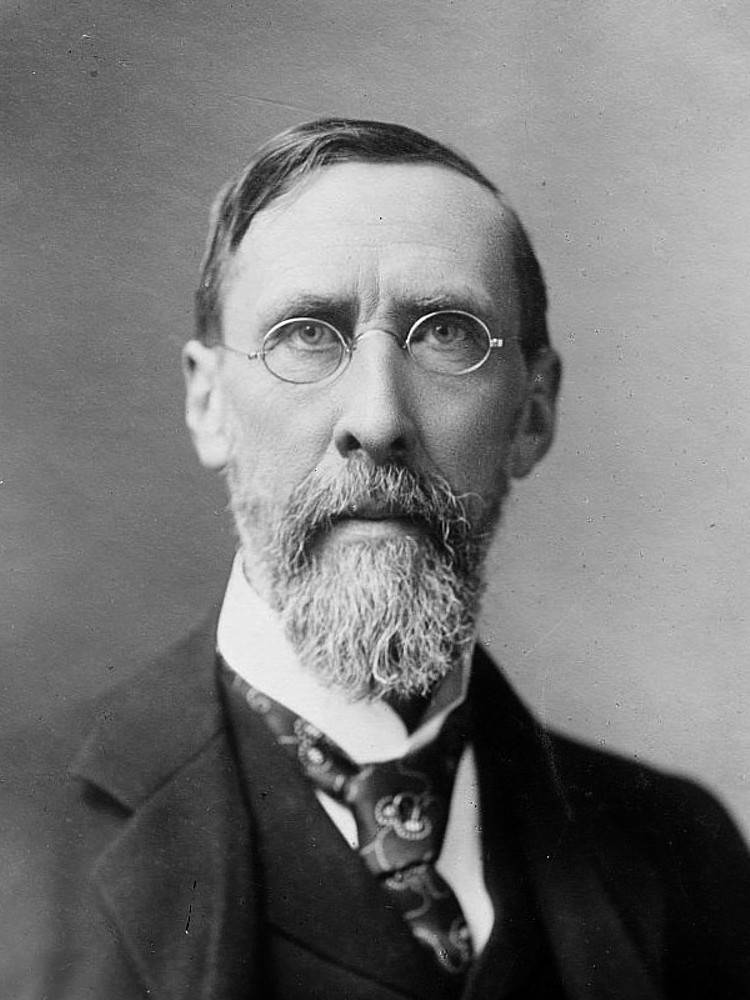

Minister of Trade and Commerce
- In office October 10, 1911 – September 21, 1921
- Prime Minister: Robert Borden
- Preceded by: Richard John Cartwright
- Succeeded by: Henry Herbert Stevens

Minister of Finance
- In office May 29, 1888 – July 8, 1896
- Prime Minister: John A. Macdonald; John Abbott; John Thompson; Mackenzie Bowell; Charles Tupper
- Preceded by: Charles Tupper
- Succeeded by: William Stevens Fielding

Minister of Marine and Fisheries
- In office December 10, 1885 – May 28, 1888
- Prime Minister: John A. Macdonald
- Preceded by: Archibald McLelan
- Succeeded by: Charles Hibbert Tupper

Parliamentary leader of the Conservative Party
- In office June 16, 1891 – November 24, 1892
- Leader: John Abbott (1891–1892); Mackenzie Bowell (1892–1896)
- Preceded by: Archibald McLelan

Senator for Ontario
- In office September 22, 1921 – December 30, 1931
- Nominated by: Arthur Meighen
- Appointed by: The Lord Byng of Vimy

Member of Parliament
- In office January 11, 1905 – September 22, 1921
- Preceded by: District created in 1903
- Succeeded by: Thomas Langton Church
- Constituency: Toronto North
- In office August 19, 1896 – February 6, 1901
- Preceded by: Thomas Temple
- Succeeded by: Alexander Gibson
- Constituency: York
- In office February 8, 1883 – August 19, 1896
- Preceded by: James Domville
- Succeeded by: James Domville
- Constituency: King's

Personal details
- Born: September 3, 1847 Carleton County, Colony of New Brunswick (now Canada)
- Died: December 30, 1931 (aged 84) Ottawa, Ontario, Canada
- Resting place: Beechwood Cemetery
- Party: Conservative
- Spouses: Adeline Davis Chisholm (m. 1889; died 1919) Jessie Allan (m. 1920)
- Education: University of New Brunswick (B.A.)

Sir George Eulas Foster (September 3, 1847 – December 30, 1931) was a Canadian politician and academic.

Foster was a Member of Parliament (MP) and a Senator in the Canadian Parliament for a total of 45 years, 5 months and 24 days. He enjoys the unique distinction of having served in the cabinets of seven Canadian Prime Ministers: Macdonald, Abbott, Thompson, Bowell, Tupper, Borden and Meighen.

He coined the phrase "splendid isolation" to praise British foreign policy in the late 19th century.

Two factors thwarted whatever ambitions he may have had to become Prime Minister himself: his legally questionable marriage in Chicago to his newly divorced former landlady, and his later involvement in a trust company scandal.

== Background ==
Foster was born September 3, 1847, in Carleton County, Colony of New Brunswick. He received a Bachelor of Arts degree from the University of New Brunswick in 1868. During his studies, he founded the University Monthly, the university's student newspaper.

Foster taught in various high schools and seminaries until 1870 when he was appointed Professor of Classics and Ancient Literature in the University of New Brunswick. He shortly afterwards studied in Edinburgh, Scotland, and Heidelberg, German Empire, resuming his professorship in 1873. He resigned in 1879 and became a noted temperance lecturer.

== Politics ==
Foster entered politics with his election to the House of Commons of Canada in the 1882 federal election as a Conservative MP representing New Brunswick. He joined the Cabinet of Sir John A. Macdonald as Minister of Marine and Fisheries in 1885, and was promoted to Minister of Finance in 1888. Foster retained this position after Macdonald's death and through the successive governments of Prime Ministers Abbott, Thompson, Bowell and Tupper. He led a group of seven cabinet ministers who resigned temporarily in January 1896 to force the retirement of Bowell, who denounced them as a 'nest of traitors'. Foster's debates with Sir Richard Cartwright, the former Liberal Minister of Finance under Prime Minister Mackenzie, are the stuff of Canadian Parliamentary legend.

With the defeat of the Tories in the 1896 election, Foster retained his seat and joined the Opposition. He was a prominent supporter of Canada's involvement in the Anglo-Boer War from 1899 to 1901. He lost his seat in the 1900 election but returned to parliament in 1904, this time representing the riding of Toronto North in Ontario. He remained an Opposition MP until his party returned to government in the 1911 federal election under Sir Robert Borden and he continued in the government under Arthur Meighen.

During his final years in cabinet, Foster served as Minister of Trade and Commerce, and received a knighthood (KCMG) in 1914 for his work in the Royal Commission on Imperial Trade; he was named to the Imperial Privy Council in 1916 and elevated to GCMG in 1918. He served as a Canadian delegate to the 1919 Versailles Peace Conference. He was acting prime minister in 1920, when Borden was absent due to ill health. From 1920 to 1921, he was chairman of the Canadian delegation to the first assembly of the League of Nations. In 1921, he was appointed to the Canadian Senate in which he served until his death.

=== "Splendid isolation" ===
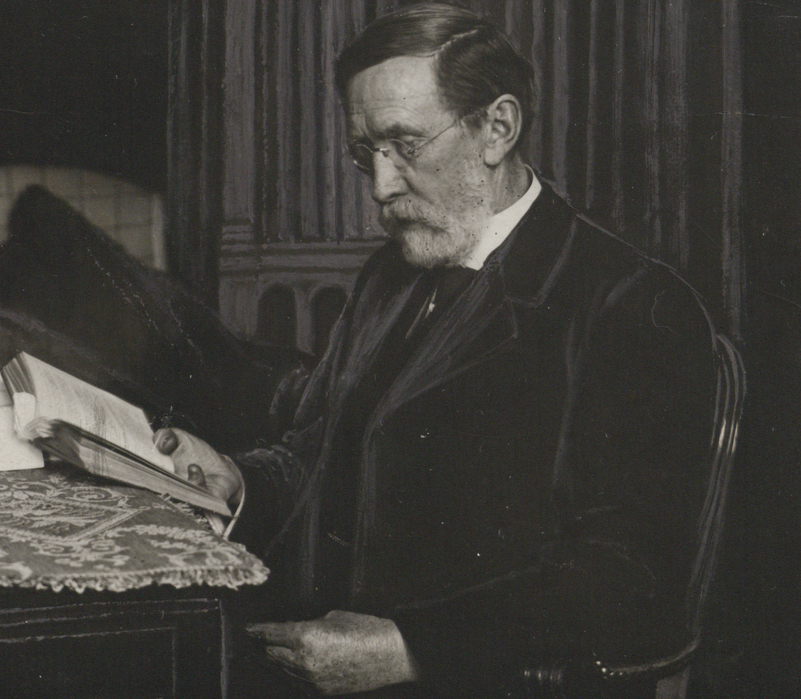
George Eulas Foster in 1919

Foster is known for coining the term "splendid isolation" in January 1896 when praising Britain's foreign policy of isolation from European affairs.

The term was popularized by Lord Goschen, First Lord of the Admiralty, during a speech at Lewes on 26 February 1896: "We have stood here alone in what is called isolation – our splendid isolation, as one of our colonial friends was good enough to call it." The phrase had appeared in a headline in The Times, on 22 January 1896, paraphrasing a comment by Foster to the Parliament of Canada on 16 January 1896: "In these somewhat troublesome days when the great Mother Empire stands splendidly isolated in Europe."

The ultimate origin of "splendid isolation" is suggested in Robert Hamilton's Canadian Quotations and Phrases, which places the Foster quotation beneath a passage from the following paragraph from Cooney's Compendious History of Northern New Brunswick and Gaspé (reprinted in 1896) describing England's situation in 1809–1810 during the Napoleonic Wars:

In the midst of this terrific commotion, England stood erect: wrapt up in her own impregnability, the storm could not affect her: and therefore, while others trembled in its blast, she smiled at its fury. Never did the 'Empress Island' appear so magnificently grand; – she stood by herself, and there was a peculiar splendour in the loneliness of her glory.

This, in turn, echoes the stoicism of Marcus Aurelius: "Be like the promontory against which the waves continually break, but it stands firm and tames the fury of the water around it."

== Death and family ==
His first wife was the ex-spouse of Daniel Black Chisholm, a former Liberal-Conservative Ontario MP, and his second wife was a daughter of Sir William Allan, a former British MP for Gateshead.

He died without children. Foster and his first wife are buried in Ottawa's Beechwood Cemetery, near the grave of Sir Cecil Spring Rice.

Following his death, Foster's widow granted Canadian historian William Stewart Wallace permission to produce an authorized biography of her late husband. Wallace was provided manuscripts, papers, and diary entries handwritten by Foster, including an unfinished autobiography. Wallace's biography of Foster, titled The Memoirs of the Rt. Hon. Sir George Foster, was published in 1933.

== Archives ==
There is a George Foster fonds at Library and Archives Canada.

== Electoral record ==
1882 Canadian federal election: King's
Party	Candidate	Votes
Conservative	George Eulas Foster	1,536
Conservative	James Domville	1,465

By-election: On election being declared void

By-election on 7 November 1882
Party	Candidate	Votes
Conservative	George Eulas Foster	2,005
Conservative	James Domville	1,723

By-election: On Mr. Foster's acceptance of the office of Minister of Marine and Fisheries

By-election on 31 December 1885
Party	Candidate	Votes
Conservative	George Eulas Foster
Independent Conservative	James Domville

1887 Canadian federal election: King's
Party	Candidate	Votes
Conservative	George Eulas Foster	2,237
Independent	James Domville	1,762

1891 Canadian federal election: King's
Party	Candidate	Votes
Conservative	George Eulas Foster	1,931
Independent	James Domville	1,858
