= Rob Parker (Canadian politician) =

Canadian politician (1943–2016)

Member of Parliament for Eglinton
- In office October 1978 – March 1979
- Preceded by: Mitchell Sharp

Personal details
- Born: January 18, 1943
- Died: March 17, 2016 (aged 73) Ajijic, Mexico
- Party: Progressive Conservative
- Profession: Broadcaster, businessman, journalist

Rob Parker (January 18, 1943 – March 17, 2016) was a Progressive Conservative party member of the House of Commons of Canada. He was a broadcaster, businessman and journalist by career.

He was elected to the 30th Canadian Parliament at the Eglinton riding in a by-election on 16 October 1978. In the 1979 election, Parker was defeated at the Eglinton—Lawrence riding by Roland de Corneille of the Liberal party. He made another unsuccessful attempt to unseat de Corneille there in the 1980 election.

In 2007, Parker was living in the Lake Chapala region of Mexico, active with the Canadian expatriate community there.

== Electoral record ==
1979 Canadian federal election: Eglinton—Lawrence
Party	Candidate	Votes	%
Liberal	Roland de Corneille	19,270	42.88
Progressive Conservative	Rob Parker	17,605	39.18
New Democratic	Leo Heaps	7,368	16.40
Libertarian	Linda Cain	585	1.30
Marxist–Leninist	Iqbal S. Sumbal	111	0.25
Total valid votes		44,939	100.00

1980 Canadian federal election: Eglinton—Lawrence
Party	Candidate	Votes	%	±%
Liberal	Roland de Corneille	20,861	50.47	+7.59
Progressive Conservative	Rob Parker	13,985	33.83	-5.35
New Democratic	Graham Murray	6,077	14.70	-1.70
Libertarian	Linda Cain	343	0.83	-0.47
Marxist–Leninist	Iqbal S. Sumbal	71	0.17	-0.08
Total valid votes		41,337	100.00	
lop.parl.ca
