= Liberal Parliamentarians for Israel =

Liberal Parliamentarians for Israel was an organization of pro-Israel parliamentarians in the Liberal Party of Canada. The group was founded in 2002, and included former MPs such as Irwin Cotler, Joe Volpe, Carolyn Bennett, Stephen Owen and Jim Peterson. As of 2006, it was chaired by Anita Neville and David Smith.
