= Third Option (Canada) =

The Third Option was a proposal from Canadian Secretary of State for External Affairs Minister Mitchell Sharp in 1972 which would have reduced trade and cultural relations between Canada and the United States and allowed for more diversification of bilateral agreements. The proposal would have been achieved by "develop(ing) and strengthen(ing) the Canadian economy and other aspects of its national life and in the process reduce the present Canadian vulnerability." in order to “assure greater Canadian independence.”

== Proposal ==
Writing for the International perspectives, Sharp proposed three options as a response to the Nixon Shock:

1. Maintain Canada’s current relationship with the U.S. on a case by case basis
2. Move deliberately toward closer integration with the U.S such as having a free-trade deal
3. Pursue a long-term strategy to strengthen the Canadian economy and other aspects of its national life in order to reduce vulnerability by pursuing opportunities with other countries.

Sharp preferred the third option.

== Aftermath ==
Shap later wrote that his proposal marshaled support for Canadian cultural institutions, but "did not … bring about any significant change in the direction of our trade." And while it "implied an internal restructuring of the Canadian economy to reduce our dependence on the United States" that "wasn't attempted and probably was too difficult to achieve given the overlapping jurisdictions of the federal and provincial governments."

The Mulroney Ministry embraced the second option with the Canada-U.S. Free Trade Agreement in 1988 leading to believing that the proposal was dead. Though, the rise of globalization in the 1990s, was to believe that it was more realistic than in the 1970s. Due to the 2025 United States trade war with Canada and Mexico, the proposal has seen a revival.

== Related links ==
- American-Canadian relations
- Brain drain
