= Mitchell Sharp =

Canadian politician (1911–2004)

The Honourable Mitchell Sharp PC CC FRCMT(hon)
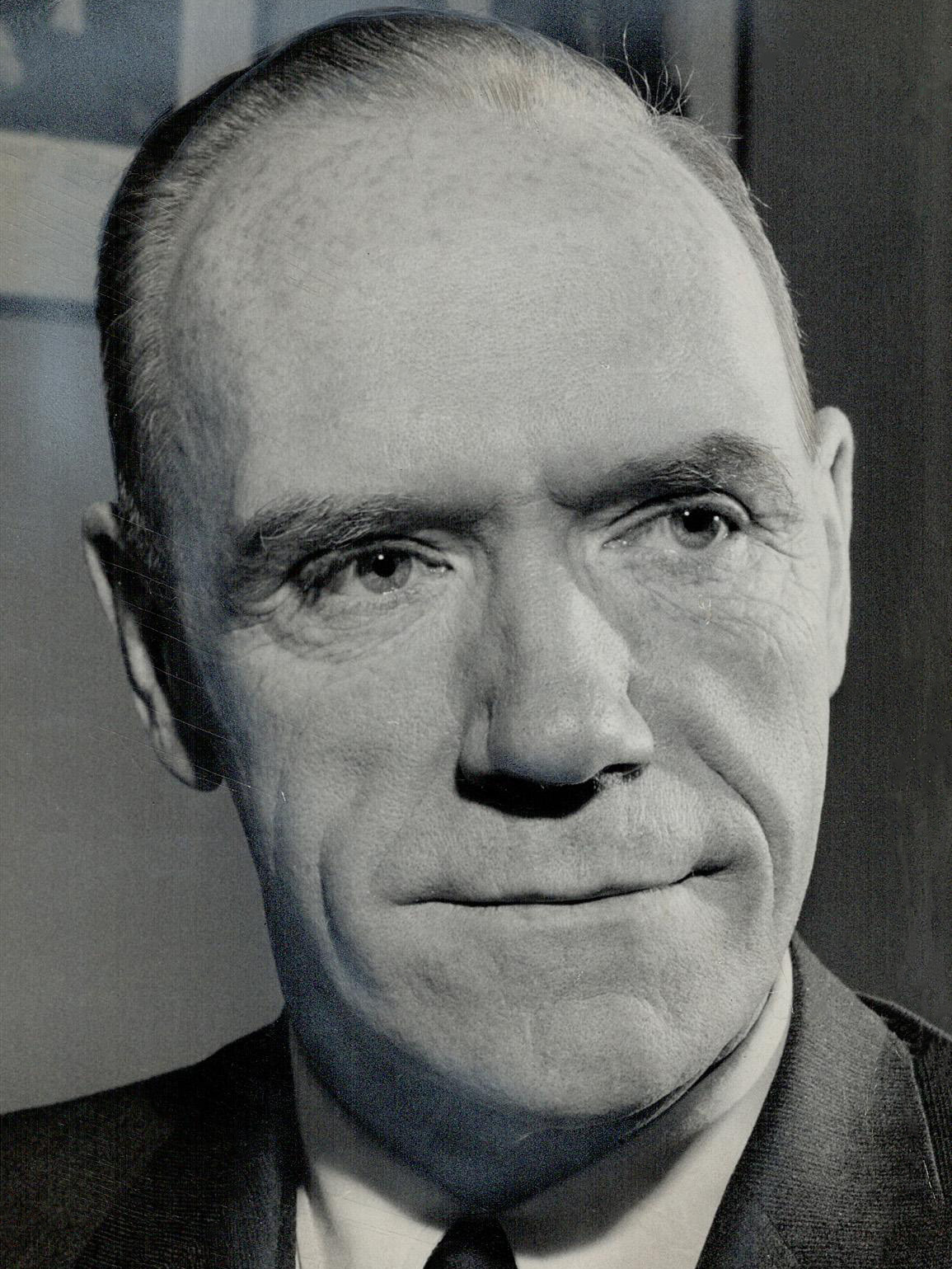
- Sharp, c. 1962

Leader of the Government in the House of Commons
- In office 8 August 1974 – 13 September 1976
- Prime Minister: Pierre Trudeau
- Preceded by: Allan MacEachen
- Succeeded by: Allan MacEachen

President of the Privy Council
- In office 8 August 1974 – 13 September 1976
- Prime Minister: Pierre Trudeau
- Preceded by: Allan MacEachen
- Succeeded by: Allan MacEachen

Secretary of State for External Affairs
- In office 20 April 1968 – 7 August 1974
- Prime Minister: Pierre Trudeau
- Preceded by: Paul Martin Sr.
- Succeeded by: Allan MacEachen

Minister of Finance
- In office 18 December 1965 – 19 April 1968; Acting: 11 November 1965 – 17 December 1965
- Prime Minister: Lester B. Pearson
- Preceded by: Walter L. Gordon
- Succeeded by: Edgar Benson

Minister of Trade and Commerce
- In office 22 April 1963 – 3 January 1966
- Prime Minister: Lester B. Pearson
- Preceded by: Malcolm Wallace McCutcheon
- Succeeded by: Robert Winters

Member of Parliament for Eglinton
- In office 8 April 1963 – 1 May 1978
- Preceded by: Donald Fleming
- Succeeded by: Rob Parker

Personal details
- Born: Mitchell William Sharp; 11 May 1911 Winnipeg, Manitoba, Canada
- Died: 19 March 2004 (aged 92) Ottawa, Ontario, Canada
- Party: Liberal
- Spouses: Daisy Boyd (m. 1938; died 1975); Jeannette Dugal (m. 1976; died 1998); Jeanne d'Arc Labrecque (m. 2001)
- Education: University of Manitoba; London School of Economics
- Profession: Economist; Businessman

Mitchell William Sharp PC CC FRCMT(hon) (11 May 1911 – 19 March 2004) was a Canadian civil servant and politician, most noted for his service as a Liberal Cabinet minister. He served in both the private and public sectors during his long career.

== Background ==
Sharp was born in Winnipeg, Manitoba. He earned his Bachelor of Arts degree from the University of Manitoba in 1934 and completed post-graduate work at that university and then at the London School of Economics. During this time, he worked as a writer focusing on the grain trade.

Sharp started his long career in public service in 1942 when he was offered a position at the Department of Finance. In 1947 he was named director of the department's Economic Policy Division. From 1951 to 1957, Sharp served as the Associate Deputy Minister of Trade and Commerce. During his tenure, he was responsible for international trade relations. Soon after, Sharp served a short term as the Deputy Minister of Trade and Commerce.

== Politics ==
In 1963, Mitchell Sharp was elected as a member of Parliament (MP) representing Eglinton. Shortly thereafter, he was assigned the portfolio of Minister of Trade and Commerce. From 1965 through 1968, Sharp was the Minister of Finance. Other ministerial positions held include Secretary of State for External Affairs (1968–1974), where he developed the third option, a proposal to diversify Canada away from the United States to maintain “assure greater Canadian independence.”, President of the Privy Council (1974–1978) and Leader of the Government in the House of Commons (1974–1978). Sharp resigned as a parliamentarian in 1978.

Sharp disliked Canada's constitutional structure, revealing in his 1994 memoirs that because of his negative views on the monarchy, he refused to accept Prime Minister Pierre Trudeau's offer to recommend him for appointment as governor general. He also stated that "Canada should have its own head of state who isn't shared by others" and that the status quo gave the impression that "Canada had not yet achieved full independence from Britain."

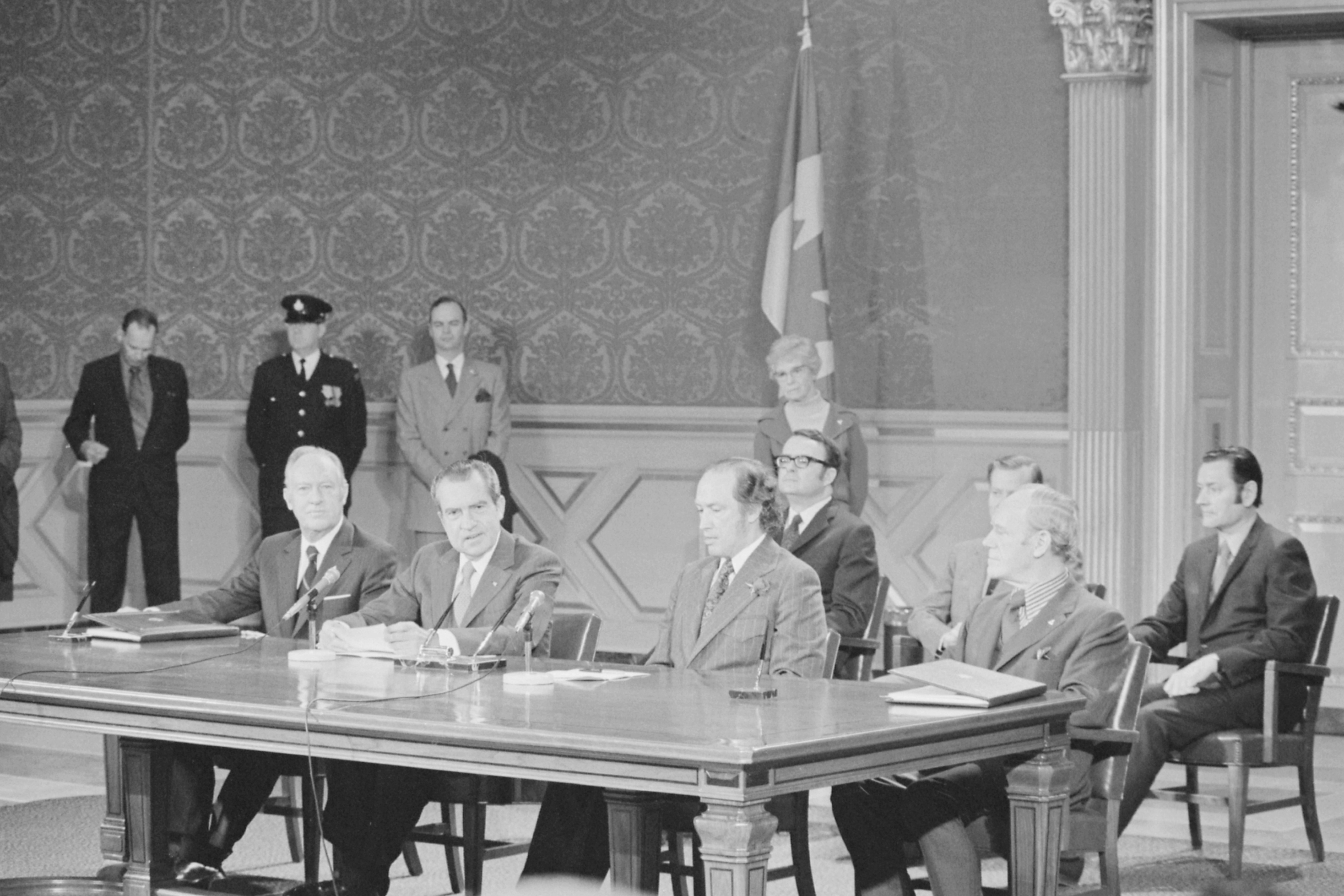
The signing ceremony for the Great Lakes Water Quality Agreement. At the table, left to right: Secretary of State William P. Rogers, President Richard M. Nixon, Prime Minister Pierre Trudeau and Mitchell Sharp.

Sharp's support was influential in securing a prominent position for the Canadian Pavilion at Expo 67 during the Canadian Centennial, which had initially been proposed to be much smaller, limited to a single acre.

== After politics ==
Sharp re-entered the public sector as the commissioner of the Northern Pipeline Agency, an agency formed under the Northern Pipeline Act (1978) to give effect to the U.S.-Canada Agreement on Principles Applicable to a Northern Natural Gas Pipeline (1977), from 1978 until 1988. His public service continued as he served as a co-chairman of a task force on conflict of interest and published a report on ethical conduct in the public service in 1984. Other posts included head of the Canadian group and deputy chairman of the Trilateral Commission (1976–1986). From 1988 through 1993, he served as a policy associate with Strategion. He was a personal adviser to Prime Minister Jean Chrétien from 1993 to 2003, a job for which he was paid $1 a year.

On February 22, 2004, Sharp fell and broke his collarbone in his home. He was taken to Elizabeth Bruyere Health Centre (hospital), in Ottawa, where he was diagnosed with an aggressive form of prostate cancer; that disease claimed his life on March 19 of that year. He was 92. He is buried in Ottawa.

== Honours ==
Mitchell Sharp was sworn in as a member of the Queen's Privy Council for Canada on 22 April 1963, giving him the honorific prefix The Honourable and the post-nominal letters "PC" for life.

Ribbon	Description	Notes
	Order of Canada (CC)	Officer – 11 April 1984; Companion – 23 September 1999
	Canadian Centennial Medal	1 July 1967
	Queen Elizabeth II Silver Jubilee Medal	1977; Canadian Version of this Medal
	125th Anniversary of the Confederation of Canada Medal	1992
	Queen Elizabeth II Golden Jubilee Medal	2002; Canadian Version of this Medal

== Honorary Degrees ==
Michell Sharp received several honorary degrees in recognition of his service to Canada.

Honorary Degrees

Country	Date	School	Degree
Manitoba	1965	University of Manitoba	Doctor of Laws (LL.D)
Ontario	6 June 1977	University of Western Ontario	Doctor of Laws (LL.D)
Ontario	1994	Carleton University	Doctor of Laws (LL.D)
Ontario	June 1995	McMaster University	Doctor of Laws (LL.D)

== Archives ==
There is a Mitchell Sharp fonds at Library and Archives Canada.
