= Joe Oliver (politician) =

Canadian politician

The Honourable Joe Oliver PC
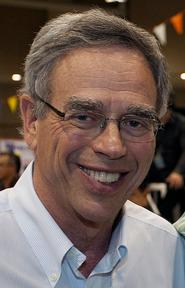
- Oliver in 2012

Minister of Finance
- In office March 19, 2014 – November 4, 2015
- Prime Minister: Stephen Harper
- Preceded by: Jim Flaherty
- Succeeded by: Bill Morneau

Minister of Natural Resources
- In office May 18, 2011 – March 19, 2014
- Prime Minister: Stephen Harper
- Preceded by: Christian Paradis
- Succeeded by: Greg Rickford

Member of Parliament for Eglinton—Lawrence
- In office May 2, 2011 – August 4, 2015
- Preceded by: Joe Volpe
- Succeeded by: Marco Mendicino

Personal details
- Born: Joseph Oliver; May 20, 1940 (age 86) Montreal, Quebec, Canada
- Party: Conservative
- Spouse: Golda Goldman
- Education: McGill University (BA, BCL); Harvard University (MBA)

Joseph Oliver, PC (born May 20, 1940) is a Canadian politician who served as Minister of Finance from 2014 to 2015. He was elected to the House of Commons in the 2011 federal election and represented the electoral district of Eglinton—Lawrence as a member of the Conservative Party until his defeat in the 2015 election. In 2017 Oliver was named non-executive chairman of the board of Echelon Wealth Partners, an independent, Canadian-owned and operated wealth management and capital markets firm. In March 2019 he was appointed to the board of directors of the Independent Electricity System Operator (IESO).

== Early life and career ==
Oliver was born and raised in Montreal, Quebec, to a Jewish family. His father was a dentist and his mother was a teacher. He grew up attending Congregation Shaar Hashomayim. He is married to Golda Goldman and has two sons, David and Jeffrey.

Oliver received a Bachelor of Arts degree in 1961 and a Bachelor of Civil Law degree in 1964 from McGill University. He received an MBA from the Harvard Business School in 1970.

Following his studies he became an investment banker with Merrill Lynch and then Nesbitt Thomson. He became executive director of the Ontario Securities Commission and was also named the CEO of the Investment Dealers Association of Canada.

== Political career ==
=== 2008 and 2011 elections ===
Oliver ran in the Toronto riding of Eglinton—Lawrence in the 2008 election, but lost to the longtime Liberal incumbent, Joe Volpe. In the 2011 election, he defeated Volpe to win the seat.

=== Minister of Natural Resources ===
On May 18, 2011, Oliver was sworn in as the Minister of Natural Resources. In June 2011, Oliver repeated Harper's campaign promise to support Quebec's asbestos industry, by claiming that chrysotile asbestos, a carcinogen, could be used "in a safe and controlled manner." As Natural Resources Minister, Oliver also oversaw SNC-Lavalin's purchase of Atomic Energy of Canada. Oliver has also defended pipeline projects for Canada's oil sands such as Keystone XL and the Enbridge Northern Gateway Pipelines. In a January 2012 open letter defending Keystone XL Oliver called Canadians who opposed the project "radicals" who "use funding from foreign special interest groups to undermine Canada's national economic interest." During his time as natural resources minister, the ministry's advertising budget grew from $237,000 in 2010–11 to $40 million in 2012–13. Also under Oliver, the regulatory checks on the energy industry's super-projects such as Keystone were streamlined.

=== Minister of Finance ===
On March 19, 2014, Oliver was appointed to replace Jim Flaherty as Minister of Finance. In January 2015, Oliver announced that the budget would not be tabled until April, instead of the usual February to March, because of economic uncertainty caused by the rapid drop in oil prices. On April 21, 2015, Oliver presented the federal budget, which projected a $1.4 billion surplus by taking $2 billion from the country's contingency fund.

=== 2015 Election ===
During the 2015 Canadian federal election, Canada was officially declared to be in a recession and fellow cabinet minister Jason Kenney, who unlike Oliver, was running in a safe riding, was the primary Conservative spokesperson on the economy. Meanwhile, Oliver kept a low profile: he cancelled two speaking events in Toronto, one at a men's club, discreetly attended a G20 conference in Turkey, and focused on winning his riding. Oliver lost the seat to Liberal challenger Marco Mendicino.

=== Attempted political comeback ===
Oliver announced in October 2016 that he was seeking the nomination of the Progressive Conservative Party of Ontario in York Centre for the 2018 provincial election. On January 15, 2017, Oliver lost the nomination to 36-year-old lawyer Roman Baber by a margin of 711 to 465 votes.

== Electoral record ==
2015 Canadian federal election: Eglinton—Lawrence
Party	Candidate	Votes	%	±%	Expenditures
Liberal	Marco Mendicino	27,278	48.89	+10.47	$155,849.60
Conservative	Joe Oliver	23,788	42.64	-4.18	$183,256.52
New Democratic	Andrew Thomson	3,505	6.28	-5.32	$114,205.95
Green	Matthew Chisholm	799	1.43	-1.74	$217.60
Libertarian	Ethan Buchman	308	0.55	–	–
Animal Alliance	Rudy Brunell Solomonvici	114	0.20	–	$5,129.72
Total valid votes/expense limit		55,792	100.00		$210,250.86
Total rejected ballots		328	0.58		
Turnout		56,120	72.45		
Eligible voters		77,463			
Liberal gain from Conservative		Swing		+7.32	
Source: Elections Canada

2011 Canadian federal election: Eglinton—Lawrence
Party	Candidate	Votes	%	±%	Expenditures
Conservative	Joe Oliver	22,652	46.81	+7.56	
Liberal	Joe Volpe	18,590	38.42	-5.57	
New Democratic	Justin Chatwin	5,613	11.60	+3.18	
Green	Paul Baker	1,534	3.17	-5.17	
Total valid votes		48,389	100.00		
Total rejected ballots		302	0.62	+0.12	
Turnout		48,691	68.02	+8.27	
Conservative gain from Liberal		Swing		+6.57	

Source: Elections Canada

2008 Canadian federal election: Eglinton—Lawrence
Party	Candidate	Votes	%	±%	Expenditures
Liberal	Joe Volpe	19,133	43.99	-8.90	$46,582
Conservative	Joe Oliver	17,073	39.25	+9.00	$82,193
New Democratic	Justin Chatwin	3,663	8.42	-3.07	$4,729
Green	Andrew James	3,629	8.34	+3.22	$6,136
Total valid votes/expense limit		43,498	100.00	$82,294	
Total rejected ballots		219	0.50		
Turnout		43,717	59.75		
Liberal hold		Swing		-8.95	

== Boards of directors ==
Oliver is on the board of directors of the High Arctic Energy Services, Independent Electricity System Operator (IESO), and the Manning Centre, and he is chairman of PlantExt, a medical cannabis firm in Israel.

Parliament of Canada
Preceded by Joe Volpe	Member of Parliament for Eglinton—Lawrence; 2011–2015	Succeeded by Marco Mendicino
Political offices
Preceded by Christian Paradis	Minister of Natural Resources; 2011–2014	Succeeded by Greg Rickford
Preceded by Jim Flaherty	Minister of Finance; 2014–2015	Succeeded by Bill Morneau
