= Duncan Hamilton McAlister =

Canadian politician (1872–1932)

Duncan Hamilton McAlister (January 18, 1872 – March 6, 1932) was a physician and political figure in New Brunswick, Canada. He represented King's and Albert in the House of Commons of Canada from 1908 to 1911 as a Liberal member.

He was born in Belleisle, New Brunswick, the son of Walter McAlister, of Scottish descent, and was educated at the Pictou Academy, Dalhousie University and McGill University. In 1898, he married Isabel Read. McAlister was an alderman for Sussex from 1902 to 1906. He ran unsuccessfully for a seat in the provincial assembly in 1908. McAlister was defeated when he ran for reelection in 1911 and in the federal riding of Royal in 1921, 1925 and 1926. He died in Sussex at the age of 60.
