= Donald Fleming =

Canadian politician

The Honourable Donald Fleming PC
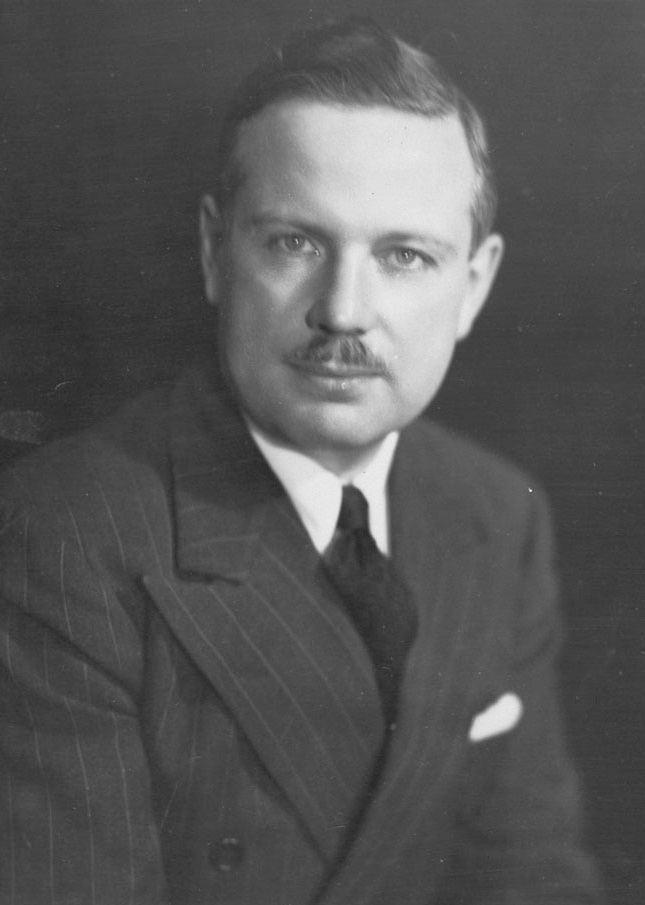

Minister of Justice
- In office August 9, 1962 – April 21, 1963
- Prime Minister: John Diefenbaker
- Preceded by: Davie Fulton
- Succeeded by: Lionel Chevrier

Minister of Finance
- In office June 21, 1957 – August 8, 1962
- Prime Minister: John Diefenbaker
- Preceded by: Walter Harris
- Succeeded by: George Nowlan

Member of Parliament for Eglinton
- In office June 11, 1945 – April 7, 1963
- Preceded by: Frederick Hoblitzell
- Succeeded by: Mitchell Sharp

Personal details
- Born: Donald Methuen Fleming; May 23, 1905 Exeter, Ontario, Canada
- Died: December 31, 1986 (aged 81) Toronto, Ontario, Canada
- Party: Progressive Conservative

Donald Methuen Fleming, PC (May 23, 1905 – December 31, 1986) was a Canadian parliamentarian, International Monetary Fund official and lawyer, born in Exeter, Ontario, Canada.

== Biography ==
Fleming was born in Exeter, Ontario, in 1905. He was educated at the University of Toronto and Osgoode Hall Law School. He was first elected to the House of Commons in the 1945 general election as a Progressive Conservative candidate in the Toronto riding of Eglinton. In 1948, he was a candidate in that year's Progressive Conservative leadership convention, losing to George Drew. He ran for the leadership again in the 1956 leadership convention, losing to John Diefenbaker.

The Speaker expelled Fleming from the House of Commons during the 1956 Pipeline Debate that helped lead to the defeat of the Liberal government of Louis St. Laurent in the 1957 general election.

Diefenbaker became the new prime minister and appointed Fleming to the cabinet as Minister of Finance. As finance minister, Fleming clashed with the governor of the Bank of Canada, James Coyne, over monetary policy and ultimately demanded and got Coyne's resignation in 1961. In 1962, Fleming became the Attorney General of Canada before retiring from politics in 1963.

Fleming returned to politics to seek the PC Party leadership at the 1967 leadership convention for a third time, but came in seventh, and left political life for good.

In later life, he was Governor of the World Bank, an International Monetary Fund official and Chairman of the Bank of Nova Scotia.

=== Personal life ===
Fleming married Alice Watson in 1933, and they had three children. He was a devout Christian, and was an elder of the Bloor Street United Church in Toronto.

Fleming died in Toronto from a stroke on December 31, 1986, at the age of 81.

== Archives ==
There is a Donald Methuen Fleming fonds at Library and Archives Canada.
