= Roland de Corneille =

Canadian politician

Member of Parliament for Eglinton—Lawrence
- In office 1979–1988
- Preceded by: New riding
- Succeeded by: Joe Volpe

Personal details
- Born: May 19, 1927 Switzerland
- Died: December 30, 2014 (aged 87) Toronto, Ontario
- Party: Liberal
- Education: Amherst College; Trinity College, Toronto; McGill University; Yale University
- Profession: Clergyman

Roland de Corneille (May 19, 1927 – December 30, 2014) was a Canadian Anglican priest, human rights activist and politician. He represented the riding of Eglinton-Lawrence in the House of Commons of Canada as a member of the Liberal Party from 1979 to 1988.

== Background ==
Born in Switzerland, de Corneille spent his childhood in France and moved to the United States where he worked and received much of his formal education. He received his BA cum laude from Amherst College, where he was elected to Phi Beta Kappa honorary society. He worked for Time Inc. as a statistician, and with Procter and Gamble. He studied at General Theological Seminary in New York and then transferred to Canada and graduated from the University of Toronto's Trinity College in 1953 as an ordained Anglican priest. He served as a curate and as a rector of a number of Anglican parish churches, while earning his degrees of Licentiate of Theology, Bachelor of Sacred Theology and Master of Theology in studies at McGill, Yale and Trinity College, Toronto. He died on December 30, 2014, aged 87.

== Views on Judaism ==
In 1960, de Corneille was the secretary of the Nathaneal Institute, an Anglican missionary institute dedicated to converting Jews to Christianity. De Corneille initiated an interfaith dialogue between the Christian and Jewish communities that led to the institute transforming itself into "the Christian-Jewish Dialogue of the Anglican Church of Canada" with de Corneille as director. The Dialogue sought better understanding between the two faith groups rather than religious conversion. In 1966, his book, Christians and Jews: The Tragic Past and the Hopeful Future was published by Harper and Row.

De Corneille is credited as the first Canadian clergyman to urge the Christian community to re-evaluate its attitude towards Jews.

As a result of de Corneille's efforts, the Anglican Church re-evaluated its attitude towards the Jewish community and renounced proselytization in favour of understanding, dialogue and reconciliation.

The process was continued by de Corneille by introducing the programme into other Canadian denominations, the Episcopal Church U.S.A., and through his membership in the World Council of Churches in Geneva. He worked with the National Conference of Christians and Jews U.S.A.. and the Canadian Conference of Christians and Jews as organizer of a major International Conference on Christian-Jewish relations. The Christian-Jewish dialogue program initiated by de Corneille ultimately spread to the United States and Europe and helped lead to a change of attitude within mainstream Christian churches, particularly towards anti-Semitism.

De Corneille's activity earned him the respect of the Jewish community. In 1971 he was appointed national director of the League for Human Rights of B'nai Brith Canada where he worked until 1979. In the 1979 federal election he was elected to the House of Commons of Canada as the Liberal Member of Parliament for Eglinton—Lawrence, serving in the House until 1988.

== Political career ==
In parliament, he was the founding chairman of the Canada-Israel Parliamentary Friendship Group, and a chairman of the Canada-Italy Parliamentary Friendship Group. From 1980 to 1981 he was national chairman of the National Committee for a Human Rights Charter which lobbied parliament for the creation of the Canadian Charter of Rights and Freedoms.

He served for three terms in the House of Commons until he was challenged for the Liberal nomination by Joe Volpe and defeated in a bitter nomination meeting prior to the 1988 federal election.

== Electoral record ==
1984 Canadian federal election: Eglinton—Lawrence
Party	Candidate	Votes	%	±%
Liberal	Roland de Corneille	18,645	42.98	-7.49
Progressive Conservative	Dan La Caprara	17,476	40.29	+6.46
New Democratic	Marlene Miller	6,458	14.89	+0.19
Libertarian	Linda Cain	362	0.83	0.00
Independent	Ken Kirk	219	0.50	
Communist	Nan McDonald	219	0.50	
Total valid votes		43,379	100.00	

1980 Canadian federal election: Eglinton—Lawrence
Party	Candidate	Votes	%	±%
Liberal	Roland de Corneille	20,861	50.47	+7.59
Progressive Conservative	Rob Parker	13,985	33.83	-5.35
New Democratic	Graham Murray	6,077	14.70	-1.70
Libertarian	Linda Cain	343	0.83	-0.47
Marxist–Leninist	Iqbal S. Sumbal	71	0.17	-0.08
Total valid votes		41,337	100.00	
lop.parl.ca

1979 Canadian federal election: Eglinton—Lawrence
Party	Candidate	Votes	%
Liberal	Roland de Corneille	19,270	42.88
Progressive Conservative	Rob Parker	17,605	39.18
New Democratic	Leo Heaps	7,368	16.40
Libertarian	Linda Cain	585	1.30
Marxist–Leninist	Iqbal S. Sumbal	111	0.25
Total valid votes		44,939	100.00

== Works ==
- De Corneille, Roland. Christians and Jews: The Tragic Past and the Hopeful Future. New York: Harper & Row, 1966.
