= King's and Albert =

Former federal electoral district in New Brunswick, Canada

New Brunswick electoral district

Defunct federal electoral district
- Legislature: House of Commons
- District created: 1903
- District abolished: 1914
- First contested: 1904
- Last contested: 1911

Demographics
- Census division(s): Albert, Kings

King's and Albert was a federal electoral district in New Brunswick, Canada, that was represented in the House of Commons of Canada from 1904 to 1917.

This riding was created in 1903 from King's and Albert ridings. It consisted of the county of King's and the county of Albert.

It was abolished in 1914 when it was redistributed into Royal and St. John—Albert ridings.

== Members of Parliament ==
This riding elected the following members of Parliament:

King's and Albert
Parliament	Years	Member	Party
Riding created from King's (1867–1904) and Albert (1867–1904)
10th	1904–1908	George William Fowler	Conservative
11th	1908–1911	Duncan Hamilton McAlister	Liberal
12th	1911–1917	George William Fowler	Conservative
Riding dissolved into St. John—Albert (1917–1968) and Royal (1917–1968)

== Election results ==
=== 1911 ===
1911 Canadian federal election
Party	Candidate	Votes	%	±%
Conservative	George William Fowler	3,734	52.33	+4.93
Liberal	Duncan Hamilton McAlister	3,402	47.67	-4.93
Total valid votes		7,136	–	
Source: Library of Parliament

=== 1908 ===
1908 Canadian federal election
Party	Candidate	Votes	%	±%
Liberal	Duncan Hamilton McAlister	3,573	52.61	+5.19
Conservative	George William Fowler	3,219	47.39	-5.19
Total valid votes		6,792	–	
Source: Library of Parliament

=== 1904 ===
1904 Canadian federal election
Party	Candidate	Votes	%
Conservative	George William Fowler	3,653	52.58
Liberal	Albert Scott White	3,294	47.42
Total valid votes		6,947	–
Source: Library of Parliament

== See also ==
- List of Canadian electoral districts
- Historical federal electoral districts of Canada
