= Newton Manley Young =

Canadian politician

Member of Parliament for Toronto Northeast
- In office 1926–1930
- Preceded by: Richard Langton Baker
- Succeeded by: Riding was abolished in 1933 when it was redistributed between Eglinton, Rosedale, Spadina and St. Paul's.

Personal details
- Born: 2 June 1892 Barrie, Ontario, Canada
- Died: 17 December 1963 (aged 71)
- Party: Conservative
- Profession: barrister

Newton Manley Young (2 June 1892 – 17 December 1963) was a Canadian politician and barrister.

Young was born in Barrie, Ontario, Canada. He was elected to the House of Commons of Canada as a Member of the historical Conservative Party in 1926 to represent the riding of Toronto Northeast. He served in World War I in France as a member of the 4th Battalion, Canadian Expeditionary Force.
