= King's (New Brunswick federal electoral district) =

Former federal electoral district in New Brunswick, Canada

New Brunswick electoral district

Defunct federal electoral district
- Legislature: House of Commons
- District created: 1867
- District abolished: 1903
- First contested: 1867
- Last contested: 1900

Demographics
- Census division(s): Kings

King's was a federal electoral district in New Brunswick, Canada, that was represented in the House of Commons of Canada from 1867 to 1904.

It was created by the British North America Act 1867. It was abolished in 1903 when it was merged into King's and Albert riding. It consisted of the County of King's.

== Members of Parliament ==
This riding elected the following members of Parliament:

Parliament	Years	Member	Party
King's
1st	1867–1872	George Ryan	Liberal
2nd	1872–1874	James Domville	Conservative
3rd	1874–1878	James Domville	Conservative
4th	1878–1882	James Domville	Conservative
5th	1882–1882	George Eulas Foster	Conservative
5th	1882–1885	George Eulas Foster	Conservative
5th	1885–1887	George Eulas Foster	Conservative
6th	1887–1891	George Eulas Foster	Conservative
7th	1891–1896	George Eulas Foster	Conservative
8th	1896–1900	James Domville	Liberal
9th	1900–1904	George William Fowler	Conservative
Riding dissolved into King's and Albert

== Election results ==
1867 Canadian federal election
Party	Candidate	Votes	Elected
Liberal	George Ryan	1,303	✓
Unknown	George Otty	1,083	
Source: Canadian Elections Database

1872 Canadian federal election
Party	Candidate	Votes
Conservative	James Domville	1,507
Unknown	L.N. Sharp	1,044
Unknown	J.E.B. McCready	657
Source: Canadian Elections Database

1874 Canadian federal election
Party	Candidate	Votes
Conservative	James Domville	1,651
Independent	J.E.B. McCready	1,389
lop.parl.ca

1878 Canadian federal election
Party	Candidate	Votes
Conservative	James Domville	1,786
Independent	L.N. Sharp	1,452

1882 Canadian federal election
Party	Candidate	Votes
Conservative	George Eulas Foster	1,536
Conservative	James Domville	1,465

By-election: On election being declared void

By-election on 7 November 1882
Party	Candidate	Votes
Conservative	George Eulas Foster	2,005
Conservative	James Domville	1,723

By-election: On Mr. Foster's acceptance of the office of Minister of Marine and Fisheries

By-election on 31 December 1885
Party	Candidate	Votes
Conservative	George Eulas Foster
Independent Conservative	James Domville

1887 Canadian federal election
Party	Candidate	Votes
Conservative	George Eulas Foster	2,237
Independent	James Domville	1,762

1891 Canadian federal election
Party	Candidate	Votes
Conservative	George Eulas Foster	1,931
Independent	James Domville	1,858

1896 Canadian federal election
Party	Candidate	Votes
Liberal	James Domville	2,389
Conservative	F.E. Morton	1,874

1900 Canadian federal election
Party	Candidate	Votes
Conservative	George William Fowler	2,566
Liberal	James Domville	2,383

== See also ==
- List of Canadian electoral districts
- Historical federal electoral districts of Canada
