= George William Fowler =

Canadian politician (1859–1924)

George William Fowler (February 24, 1859 – September 2, 1924) was a lawyer and political figure in New Brunswick, Canada. He represented King's County in the Legislative Assembly of New Brunswick from 1895 to 1899 and King's then King's and Albert in the House of Commons of Canada from 1900 to 1908 and 1911 to 1917 as a Conservative member. Fowler went on to represent Kings and Albert division in the Senate of Canada from 1917 to 1924.

He was born in Hammond Vale, New Brunswick and was educated in Saint John, at Dalhousie University and at Boston University. Fowler was admitted to the New Brunswick bar in 1884. He served on the council for King's County from 1886 to 1890 and served as warden in 1889. Fowler was Grand Master for the Orange Lodge in New Brunswick from 1890 to 1893.

After the Conservatives were accused in the House of improprieties by a Liberal member, Fowler responded:

I shall allow no man to make an attack on me or my character without retorting. I shall discuss the character of honourable Members opposite, whether they be ministers or private members, and their connection with women, wine and graft.

He was defeated in a bid for reelection to the federal seat in 1908. Fowler was a lieutenant-colonel in the Canadian Expeditionary Force during World War I. He died in office in 1924.

== Family ==
Fowler's wife, Ethyl Georgina Fowler, died in 1936. They had three children: Gladys Winifred Fowler died at age 18 in London, England, in 1917 of a variety of ailments including heart problems, Cedric Weeden Fowler born 1905, and Eric Fowler died at age 30. It was discovered in 2009 that the casket containing Gladys's remains had never been buried. It had been crated for shipping, but the crate had remained at Kensal Green Cemetery in London. She was buried on November 15, 2009.
