= Eglinton—Lawrence (federal electoral district) =

Federal electoral district in Ontario, Canada

Coordinates: 43.717°N 79.448°W

Ontario electoral district
- Interactive map of riding boundaries from the 2004 federal election

Federal electoral district
- Legislature: House of Commons
MP
Vince Gasparro
Liberal
- District created: 1976
- First contested: 1979
- Last contested: 2025
- District webpage: profile, map

Demographics
- Population (2021): 115,832
- Electors (2015): 76,739
- Area (km²): 22.67
- Pop. density (per km²): 5,109.5
- Census division: Toronto
- Census subdivision: Toronto (part)

Eglinton—Lawrence is a federal electoral district in Ontario, Canada, that has been represented in the House of Commons of Canada since 1979.

It covers a portion of Toronto northwest of downtown. It stretches from Yonge Street in the east to Caledonia in the west and from Highway 401 in the north to Eglinton Avenue in the south. Lawrence Avenue runs through the centre of the riding. Neighbourhoods in the riding include Bedford Park, Lawrence Manor, Lawrence Heights, the southwestern part of York Mills and the western part of Lawrence Park. The riding includes portions of the former cities of North York, Toronto, and York.

As per the 2016 Census, Eglinton—Lawrence is the City of Toronto riding with the highest percentage of people of Polish ethnic origin (12.0%) and the second-highest percentage of people of Jewish ethnic origin (5.1%). The riding has a large Jewish population, currently the third-largest in Canada at 16.5 percent behind Thornhill and Mount Royal.

The riding was created in 1976 from parts of Eglinton, York Centre, York South, and York West. It has been represented by Liberal Joe Volpe from 1988 to 2011, by Conservative Joe Oliver from 2011 to 2015, and by Liberal Marco Mendicino from 2015 to 2025. It is a relatively safe seat for the Liberal Party, having returned only Liberal MPs at every election except the 2011 Canadian federal election, although the Conservatives are stronger here than in other Central Toronto ridings, notably only losing by 2% in 2025.

== History ==
This riding's boundaries were not changed during the 2012 electoral redistribution.

=== Former boundaries ===
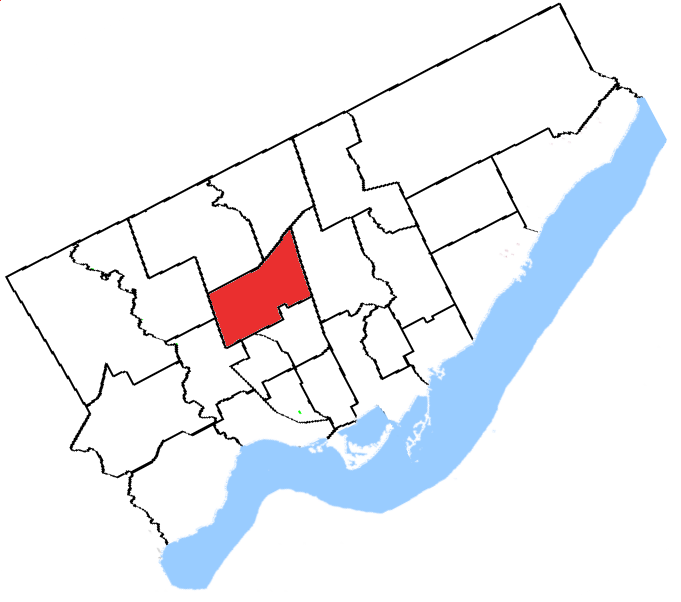
1979 to 1988

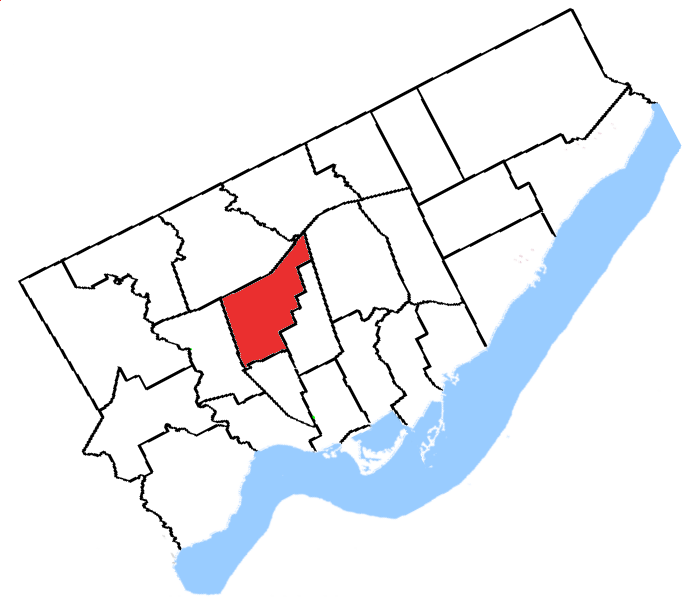
1988 to 1997

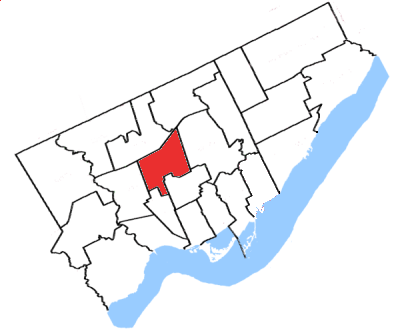
1997 to 2004

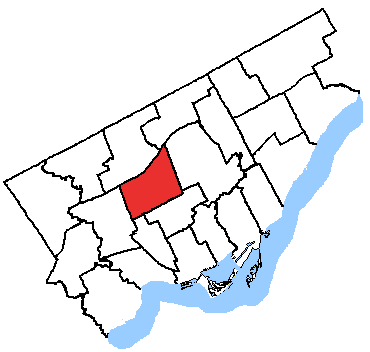
2004 to 2015

== Demographics ==
According to the 2021 Canadian census

Languages: 59.5% English, 5.3% Tagalog, 3.3% Spanish, 3.1% Italian, 2.8% Portuguese, 1.7% Russian, 1.6% Mandarin, 1.3% Cantonese, 1.0% French

Religions: 48.2% Christian (28.8% Catholic, 3.5% Christian Orthodox, 2.8% Anglican, 1.8% United Church, 1.0% Pentecostal, 8.0% Other), 22.2% Jewish, 3.5% Muslim, 1.8% Hindu, 1.1% Buddhist, 22.4% None

Median income: $44,000 (2020)

Average income: $88,500 (2020)

Panethnic groups in Eglinton—Lawrence (2011−2021)
Panethnic group	2021		2016		2011	
Panethnic group	Pop.	%	Pop.	%	Pop.	%
European (Note: Statistic includes all persons that did not make up part of a visible minority or an indigenous identity.)	71,915	62.63%	76,445	67.7%	78,415	70.64%
Southeast Asian (Note: Statistic includes total responses of "Filipino" and "Southeast Asian" under visible minority section on census.)	14,140	12.31%	13,215	11.7%	11,500	10.36%
East Asian (Note: Statistic includes total responses of "Chinese", "Korean", and "Japanese" under visible minority section on census.)	7,220	6.29%	6,275	5.56%	5,070	4.57%
African	6,560	5.71%	6,205	5.49%	6,740	6.07%
South Asian	4,530	3.95%	3,005	2.66%	2,885	2.6%
Latin American	4,515	3.93%	3,280	2.9%	2,790	2.51%
Middle Eastern (Note: Statistic includes total responses of "West Asian" and "Arab" under visible minority section on census.)	2,265	1.97%	1,675	1.48%	1,485	1.34%
Indigenous	645	0.56%	560	0.5%	485	0.44%
Other/multiracial (Note: Statistic includes total responses of "Visible minority, n.i.e." and "Multiple visible minorities" under visible minority section on census.)	3,025	2.63%	2,260	2%	1,635	1.47%
Total responses	114,820	99.13%	112,925	98.71%	111,000	98.1%
Total population	115,832	100%	114,395	100%	113,150	100%
Notes: Totals greater than 100% due to multiple origin responses. Demographics based on 2012 Canadian federal electoral redistribution riding boundaries.

== Members of Parliament ==
This riding has elected the following members of Parliament:

Parliament	Years	Member	Party
Eglinton—Lawrence; Riding created from Eglinton, York Centre, York South and York West
31st	1979–1980	Roland de Corneille	Liberal
32nd	1980–1984	Roland de Corneille	Liberal
33rd	1984–1988	Roland de Corneille	Liberal
34th	1988–1993	Joe Volpe	Liberal
35th	1993–1997	Joe Volpe	Liberal
36th	1997–2000	Joe Volpe	Liberal
37th	2000–2004	Joe Volpe	Liberal
38th	2004–2006	Joe Volpe	Liberal
39th	2006–2008	Joe Volpe	Liberal
40th	2008–2011	Joe Volpe	Liberal
41st	2011–2015	Joe Oliver	Conservative
42nd	2015–2019	Marco Mendicino	Liberal
43rd	2019–2021	Marco Mendicino	Liberal
44th	2021–2025	Marco Mendicino	Liberal
45th	2025–present	Vince Gasparro	Liberal

== Election results ==
View source data.
Graph of general election results in Eglinton—Lawrence (minor parties that never got 2% of the vote or didn't run consistently are omitted)

2025 Canadian federal election
Party	Candidate	Votes	%	±%	Expenditures
Liberal	Vince Gasparro	29,949	49.3	+0.7	
Conservative	Karen Stintz	29,061	47.8	+11.4	
New Democratic	Allison Tanzola	996	1.6	–7.6	
Green	Wayne Chechuevskiy	429	0.7	–2.3	
People's	Timothy Gleeson	326	0.5	–2.4	
Total valid votes/expense limit		60,761	99.4	+0.4	
Total rejected ballots		416	0.6	-0.4	
Turnout		61,117	70.9	+9.1	
Eligible voters		86,150			
Liberal hold		Swing		–5.30	
Source: Elections Canada

2021 Canadian federal election
Party	Candidate	Votes	%	±%	Expenditures
Liberal	Marco Mendicino	24,051	48.5	-4.8	$95,507.96
Conservative	Geoff Pollock	18,082	36.4	+3.3	$100,748.76
New Democratic	Caleb Senneker	4,543	9.2	+0.7	$9,675.61
Green	Eric Frydman	1,490	3.0	-1.1	$1,195.38
People's	Timothy Gleeson	1,445	2.9	+1.9	$3,802.06
Total valid votes/expense limit		49,611	99.0	–	$111,049.10
Total rejected ballots		479	1.0		
Turnout		50,090	61.8		
Eligible voters		81,060			
Liberal hold		Swing		-4.1	
Source: Elections Canada

2019 Canadian federal election
Party	Candidate	Votes	%	±%	Expenditures
Liberal	Marco Mendicino	29,850	53.3	+4.41	$86,046.25
Conservative	Chani Aryeh-Bain	18,549	33.1	-10.14	$71,631.04
New Democratic	Alexandra Nash	4,741	8.5	+2.12	$10,049.32
Green	Reuben DeBoer	2,278	4.1	+3.27	$3,248.70
People's	Michael Staffieri	586	1.0	-	$5,424.02
Total valid votes/expense limit		56,004	100.0		
Total rejected ballots		394			
Turnout		56,398			
Eligible voters		82,811			
Liberal hold		Swing		+4.41	
Source: Elections Canada

2015 Canadian federal election
Party	Candidate	Votes	%	±%	Expenditures
Liberal	Marco Mendicino	27,278	48.89	+10.47	$155,849.60
Conservative	Joe Oliver	23,788	42.64	-4.18	$183,256.52
New Democratic	Andrew Thomson	3,505	6.28	-5.32	$114,205.95
Green	Matthew Chisholm	799	1.43	-1.74	$217.60
Libertarian	Ethan Buchman	308	0.55	–	–
Animal Alliance	Rudy Brunell Solomonvici	114	0.20	–	$5,129.72
Total valid votes/expense limit		55,792	100.00		$210,250.86
Total rejected ballots		328	0.58		
Turnout		56,120	72.45		
Eligible voters		77,463			
Liberal gain from Conservative		Swing		+7.32	
Source: Elections Canada

2011 Canadian federal election
Party	Candidate	Votes	%	±%	Expenditures
Conservative	Joe Oliver	22,652	46.81	+7.56	
Liberal	Joe Volpe	18,590	38.42	-5.57	
New Democratic	Justin Chatwin	5,613	11.60	+3.18	
Green	Paul Baker	1,534	3.17	-5.17	
Total valid votes		48,389	100.00		
Total rejected ballots		302	0.62	+0.12	
Turnout		48,691	68.02	+8.27	
Conservative gain from Liberal		Swing		+6.57	

Source: Elections Canada

2008 Canadian federal election
Party	Candidate	Votes	%	±%	Expenditures
Liberal	Joe Volpe	19,133	43.99	-8.90	$46,582
Conservative	Joe Oliver	17,073	39.25	+9.00	$82,193
New Democratic	Justin Chatwin	3,663	8.42	-3.07	$4,729
Green	Andrew James	3,629	8.34	+3.22	$6,136
Total valid votes/expense limit		43,498	100.00	$82,294	
Total rejected ballots		219	0.50		
Turnout		43,717	59.75		
Liberal hold		Swing		-8.95	

2006 Canadian federal election
Party	Candidate	Votes	%	±%	Expenditures
Liberal	Joe Volpe	26,044	52.89	−7.35	$66,769
Conservative	Peter Coy	14,897	30.25	+5.20	$59,382
New Democratic	Maurganne Mooney	5,660	11.49	+1.11	$7,722
Green	Patrick Metzger	2,520	5.12	+1.03	$1,338
N/A (Communist League)	John Steele	123	0.25		$369
Total valid votes		49,244	100.00		
Total rejected ballots		245			
Turnout		49,489	67.61	+3.84	
Electors on the lists		73,201			
Sources: Official Results, Elections Canada and Financial Returns, Elections Canada.

2004 Canadian federal election
Party	Candidate	Votes	%	±%	Expenditures
Liberal	Joe Volpe	28,360	60.24	+1.07	$72,089
Conservative	Bernie Tanz	11,792	25.05	−6.88	$71,823
New Democratic	Max Silverman	4,886	10.38	+3.93	$8,534
Green	Shel Goldstein	1,924	4.09		$2,377
Canadian Action	Corrinne Prévost	115	0.24		$0
Total valid votes		47,077	100.00		
Total rejected ballots		284			
Turnout		47,361	63.77		
Electors on the lists		74,266			
Percentage change figures are factored for redistribution. Conservative Party percentages are contrasted with the combined Canadian Alliance and Progressive Conservative percentages from 2000.
Sources: Official Results, Elections Canada and Financial Returns, Elections Canada.

2000 Canadian federal election
Party	Candidate	Votes	%	±%	Expenditures
Liberal	Joe Volpe	25,161	60.68	+1.44	$53,652
Progressive Conservative	Louise Sankey	7,156	17.26	−5.49	$16,232
Alliance	Joel Etienne	5,497	13.26	+5.17	$18,685
New Democratic	Simon Rowland	2,663	6.42	−2.60	$1,577
Green	Doug Howat	688	1.66		$579
Marxist–Leninist	Frank Chilelli	164	0.40		$8
Natural Law	Matthew Macleod	133	0.32	−0.59	$0
Total valid votes		41,462	100.00		
Total rejected ballots		263			
Turnout		41,725	57.58	−9.42	
Electors on the lists		72,463			
Sources: Official Results, Elections Canada and Financial Returns, Elections Canada.

1997 Canadian federal election
Party	Candidate	Votes	%	±%	Expenditures
Liberal	Joe Volpe	25,985	59.24	−4.07	$49,531
Progressive Conservative	David Rotenberg	9,977	22.75	+5.11	$34,874
New Democratic	Sam Savona	3,955	9.02	+4.36	$14,088
Reform	Charles Van Tuinen	3,547	8.09	−3.65	$10,529
Natural Law	Robyn Brandon	397	0.91		$0
Total valid votes		43,861	100.00		
Total rejected ballots		320			
Turnout		44,181	67.00		
Electors on the lists		65,945			
Percentage change figures are factored for redistribution.
Sources: Official Results, Elections Canada and Financial Returns, Elections Canada.

1993 Canadian federal election
Party	Candidate	Votes	%	±%	Expenditures
Liberal	Joe Volpe	28,634	71.62	+20.60	$38,419
Reform	Charles Van Tuinen	4,347	10.87		$13,413
Progressive Conservative	Marc Monson	4,262	10.66	−20.28	$19,954
New Democratic Party	Gael Hepworth	2,091	5.23	−10.34	$12,165
Natural Law	Debbie Weberg	384	0.96		$0
Marxist–Leninist	Jeanne Gatley	138	0.35		$105
Abolitionist	Linda Kruschel	124	0.31		$0
Total valid votes		39,980	100.00		
Total rejected ballots		480			
Turnout		40,460	68.28	−6.48	
Electors on the lists		59,254			
Source: Thirty-fifth General Election, 1993: Official Voting Results, Published by the Chief Electoral Officer of Canada. Financial figures taken from official contributions and expenses provided by Elections Canada.

1988 Canadian federal election
Party	Candidate	Votes	%	±%	Expenditures
Liberal	Joe Volpe	20,446	51.02	+8.04	$33,611
Progressive Conservative	Tony Abbott	12,400	30.94	−9.35	$26,187
New Democratic	Vittoria Levi	6,241	15.57	+0.68	$16,036
Libertarian	Sandor L. Hegedus	538	1.34	+0.51	$0
Communist	Geoffrey da Silva	208	0.52	+0.02	$357
Revolutionary; Workers League	Margaret Manwaring	123	0.31		$776
Commonwealth of Canada	James Felicioni	122	0.30		$67
Total valid votes		40,078	100.00		
Total rejected ballots		565			
Turnout		40,643	74.76		
Electors on the lists		54,362			

1984 Canadian federal election
Party	Candidate	Votes	%	±%
Liberal	Roland de Corneille	18,645	42.98	-7.49
Progressive Conservative	Dan La Caprara	17,476	40.29	+6.46
New Democratic	Marlene Miller	6,458	14.89	+0.19
Libertarian	Linda Cain	362	0.83	0.00
Independent	Ken Kirk	219	0.50	
Communist	Nan McDonald	219	0.50	
Total valid votes		43,379	100.00	

1980 Canadian federal election
Party	Candidate	Votes	%	±%
Liberal	Roland de Corneille	20,861	50.47	+7.59
Progressive Conservative	Rob Parker	13,985	33.83	-5.35
New Democratic	Graham Murray	6,077	14.70	-1.70
Libertarian	Linda Cain	343	0.83	-0.47
Marxist–Leninist	Iqbal S. Sumbal	71	0.17	-0.08
Total valid votes		41,337	100.00	
lop.parl.ca

1979 Canadian federal election
Party	Candidate	Votes	%
Liberal	Roland de Corneille	19,270	42.88
Progressive Conservative	Rob Parker	17,605	39.18
New Democratic	Leo Heaps	7,368	16.40
Libertarian	Linda Cain	585	1.30
Marxist–Leninist	Iqbal S. Sumbal	111	0.25
Total valid votes		44,939	100.00

== Toronto Council Ward 8 ==
Eglinton—Lawrence is also the name for ward 8 on Toronto City Council currently represented by city councillor Michael Colle.

== See also ==
- List of Canadian electoral districts
- Historical federal electoral districts of Canada
