= Joe Volpe =

Canadian politician (born 1947)

The Honourable Joe Volpe PC
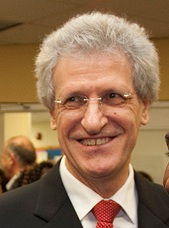

Chair of the Standing Committee on Public Accounts
- In office September 30, 2010 – June 14, 2011
- Minister: Stockwell Day
- Preceded by: Shawn Murphy
- Succeeded by: David Christopherson

Member of Parliament for Eglinton—Lawrence
- In office November 21, 1988 – May 2, 2011
- Preceded by: Roland de Corneille
- Succeeded by: Joe Oliver

Personal details
- Born: Giuseppe Joseph Volpe; September 21, 1947 (age 78) Monteleone di Puglia, Italy
- Party: Liberal
- Spouse: Mirella Volpe
- Children: 4
- Profession: Educator, school principal, teacher, vice-principal

Giuseppe "Joe" Volpe PC (born September 21, 1947) is a Canadian politician. He represented the Ontario riding of Eglinton-Lawrence as a member of the Liberal Party in the House of Commons of Canada from 1988 until 2011, when he lost his seat to Conservative candidate Joe Oliver. Volpe held two senior positions in Prime Minister Paul Martin's Cabinet from 2003 to 2006, and served as transportation critic when his party became the Official Opposition. In 2006, he ran unsuccessfully for the Liberal Party leadership.

== Background ==
Volpe was born in Monteleone di Puglia, in southern Italy, and migrated to Canada with his family in 1955. As a teacher, he taught in Stoney Creek from 1971 to 1974, headed the history department of a secondary school in Etobicoke from 1974 to 1979, and was head of multicultural studies in a college in Weston, Ontario between 1979 and 1982. He worked as a mortgage development officer in 1982–83, and was vice-principal of the James Cardinal McGuigan Catholic High School (which he helped found) between 1983 and 1988.

He is married to Mirella and they have four children.

== Early political career ==
Volpe first became involved with the Liberal Party in the 1968 federal election, when he worked on Charles Caccia's campaign in Davenport. He ran for the North York Board of Education in the 1974 municipal election as a separate school representative, but was defeated. He later ran for the Ontario legislature in the 1981 provincial election and narrowly lost to New Democratic Party incumbent Odoardo Di Santo in Downsview. The following year, he supported David Peterson for the Ontario Liberal Party leadership.

Volpe subsequently chaired the sponsoring group of an immigrant counseling agency called Alliance Community Services, which received a controversial $500,000 grant from the federal government in January 1984. Local municipal politicians Howard Moscoe and Maria Rizzo charged that the ACS was a partisan organization and that the grant was political patronage; Volpe and others rejected this charge. Maria Minna, the president of COSTI-IIAS Immigrant Services, opposed the grant on the grounds that the new organization would duplicate the work of her organization. Employment and Immigration Minister John Roberts retracted the grant following criticism, but later reversed himself and allowed it to proceed. The ACS dissolved in early 1985.

Volpe increased his profile in the mid-1980s by recruiting many new Liberal Party members from Toronto's Italian community. He helped influence several party nomination contests, including John Nunziata's 1984 victory over Paul Hellyer in York South—Weston. Some questioned Volpe's methods and suggested that he was manipulating the system by signing up "instant party members", a charge that he denied. He endorsed John Roberts in the 1984 federal Liberal leadership convention, and threw his support to Jean Chrétien on the second ballot after Roberts withdrew from the contest. The winning candidate was John Turner, who led the Liberal Party to defeat in the 1984 federal election.

Volpe unsuccessfully campaigned for the presidency of the Ontario Liberal Party in 1985 and 1986, against media speculation that leading figures in the party opposed his candidacy. Despite Volpe's earlier support for Chrétien, he organized a pro-Turner slate for the Liberal Party's 1986 leadership review. Turner, who was faced with public and backroom challenges since 1984, received the necessary support to consolidate his leadership. Volpe spoke out against the Meech Lake Accord the following year, while most of the Liberal leadership supported it.

== Member of Parliament ==
=== Nomination challenge ===
Volpe successfully challenged sitting Liberal Member of Parliament (MP) Rev. Roland de Corneille to win the party's nomination for Eglinton—Lawrence in the 1988 election. The contest was extremely divisive, with de Corneille alleging that Volpe was "trying to organize a group for his personal advantage" in recruiting new members from the riding's Italian community.

After losing the nomination, de Corneille endorsed Progressive Conservative candidate Tony Abbott, who was himself a former Liberal cabinet minister. Volpe defended his right to seek the nomination, arguing that Toronto's Italian residents were seeking to play a more active role in government. He also sought a reconciliation with de Corneille's supporters, many of whom were from the riding's Jewish community. Despite the divisions engendered by his nomination, Volpe won a convincing victory on election day.

=== Opposition member, 1988–1993 ===
The Progressive Conservatives were re-elected with a majority government in the 1988 election and Volpe sat as a member of the official opposition for the next five years, serving as his party's revenue critic for part of this time. During the constitutional debates of the early 1990s, he suggested that the Parliament of Canada (as opposed to the executive branch of government) should assume responsibility for reformulating the terms of Canadian Confederation. He argued that parliament represented a strong cross-section of Canada's population, saying that parliamentary initiative on constitutional reform could save millions of dollars on "needless commissions".

Volpe supported Paul Martin in the 1990 federal Liberal leadership convention, which was won by Jean Chrétien. He subsequently opposed some of Chrétien's reforms to the Liberal Party constitution, including a change that allowed the leader to appoint candidates in selected ridings. Several Chrétien supporters defended this as necessary to prevent "instant party members" from taking over the party nomination process; many believe the change was directed against both Volpe and the Liberals for Life group affiliated with MP Tom Wappel.

Volpe remained one of Martin's most prominent Toronto-area supporters after 1990. Many political observers believe this association kept him out of cabinet during Chrétien's tenure as prime minister, from 1993 to 2003.

=== Government backbencher ===
The Liberals won a majority government in the 1993 election, and Volpe sat as a government backbencher in the parliament that followed. He was elected chair of the Ontario Liberal caucus following the election, but unexpectedly lost the position to a challenge from Sue Barnes in 1995. On 23 February 1996, he was appointed parliamentary secretary to the Minister of National Health and Welfare. The ministry was renamed on 12 July 1996, and Volpe's position was restyled as parliamentary secretary to the Minister of Health, a position he held until 15 July 1998.

Volpe was easily re-elected to parliament in the 1997 election. His closest opponent was Progressive Conservative candidate David Rotenberg, a former minister in the provincial government of Frank Miller. Volpe later endorsed Mel Lastman's bid to become Mayor of Toronto in 1997 municipal election.

Volpe served as chair of the all-party Commons Health Committee after the 1997 election. He brought forward a report in late 1998 encouraging the sale of herbal medicines in Canada, and advocating their regulation in a category separate from foods and drugs. The following year, his committee produced a series of recommendations for improving Canada's organ donation system.

Volpe was also given responsibility for overseeing Canada's investigation of a controversial vitamin-hormone cancer treatment run by Luigi di Bella in Italy. Some of Di Bella's supporters believed that his treatments actually cured cancer, and requested that their government investigate the possibility of assisting his research. Volpe led a delegation of Canadian doctors to Italy, arguing that they would either expose Di Bella as a fraud or establish the terms for assistance: they concluded there was no evidence to support the validity of his work. Volpe initially recommended that further research be conducted, arguing the doctor's treatment could lead to an improved quality of life for cancer patients even if it did not actually cure the disease.

In 1999, Volpe argued that the government's proposed Citizenship Act was too restrictive and arbitrary, saying that it could result in reduced immigration to Canada. He and fellow MP Andrew Telegdi were particularly critical of a section of the bill which allowed cabinet ministers to override the judicial system in rejecting applications from immigrants. He voted against the bill on its final reading in May 2000.

Volpe was not promoted to cabinet in the August 1999 cabinet shuffle. He served as chair of the Commons Standing Committee on Natural Resources in 2000, and developed a report for improving Canada's national highway system. He also collaborated with Toronto-area MPs Derek Lee and John McKay to create a job placement and training program for at-risk youth in Toronto, called Workplace Connections. He described as "unfortunate" Canada's decision to support a United Nations resolution critical of Israel in October 2000, and later argued that Canada should have abstained. During the 2000 campaign, Volpe advocated tax breaks for parents who send their children to private religious schools. He was re-elected without difficulty.

Volpe sought re-appointment as chair of the Natural Resources committee in 2001, but did not receive the position. He became increasingly critical of the Chrétien government during the next two years, and made no secret of his support for Paul Martin to replace Chrétien as party leader. Volpe criticized the Chrétien government for moving too slowly to replace Canada's aging Sea King helicopters, and encouraged the government to purchase the EH-101 Cormorant helicopters recommended by the previous Progressive Conservative government of Brian Mulroney. In November 2002, he called for the government to provide compensation for all victims of Hepatitis C who were infected through the national blood supply system, and criticized the Chrétien government's more restrictive settlement. He also expressed skepticism about the Chrétien government's plans to decriminalize cannabis, saying "I believe it's a gateway drug. [...] It's going to be a pretty convincing argument to get me to vote for it." He was an opponent of the government's plans to legalize same-sex marriage during this period, and voted to retain the traditional definition of marriage in 2003.

Volpe worked openly for Paul Martin's bid to replace Chrétien as Liberal Party leader after June 2002, when Martin left Chrétien's cabinet under disputed circumstances. In June 2002, Volpe became one of the first sixteen Liberal MPs to publicly call for Chrétien to resign as prime minister. During the same year, he became a founding member of the group Liberal Parliamentarians for Israel.

== Cabinet Minister ==
=== Minister of Human Resources and Skills Development ===
Paul Martin won an overwhelming victory in the 2003 federal Liberal leadership convention, and became Prime Minister of Canada on December 12, 2003. He appointed Volpe to cabinet as Minister of Human Resources and Skills Development, with responsibility for labour, homelessness, training, community economic development and federal student loans. He was also named as political minister for Ontario and the Greater Toronto Area, and was appointed to Martin's priorities and planning committee, known as the inner cabinet. Soon after his appointment, Volpe announced that he would revamp the federal job skills and training programs to better meet the needs of employers. He argued that Canada needed significant skill upgrading reforms in order to retain its long-term employment prospects.

Volpe announced a new "Compassionate Care" benefit in January 2004, providing paid leave for Canadians who were forced to leave work to care for seriously ill family members. In May of the same year, he introduced reforms to Canada's Employment Insurance laws making it easier for seasonal workers to apply for benefits. Volpe promised a number of spending initiatives during the 2004 federal election, including $1 billion over five years for research, development and innovation in the automotive industry.

The Liberals were reduced to a minority government in this election, although Volpe was re-elected by a comfortable margin in Eglinton—Lawrence. He was retained as Human Resources and Skills Development minister after the election.

In late 2004, Canadian Auditor General Sheila Fraser accused the federal government of violating the spirit of its laws by running a large surplus of Employment Insurance funds, arguing that the government was using money earmarked for the unemployed to fund separate programs. Volpe acknowledged there were problems with the EI system, but noted that rates were falling and would likely continue to fall in the future.

During the same period, federal Minister of Citizenship and Immigration Judy Sgro was criticized for granting a temporary residency permit to Romanian exotic dancer who had worked on her election campaign. Sgro denied she had done anything wrong, and argued that she granted the permit on compassionate grounds. In the aftermath of the controversy, the Martin government eliminated a federal program that allowed foreign-born exotic dancers to enter the country. Volpe was given credit for this decision and was quoted as saying, "I didn't feel in the slightest bit comfortable with the program and I didn't think there was any justification for it".

=== Minister of Citizenship and Immigration ===
Judy Sgro announced her resignation from cabinet on 14 January 2005, following accusations that she had offered to intervene in the immigration hearing of Harjit Singh in return for free food during the 2004 campaign (these accusations were later retracted and Sgro was cleared of any wrongdoing). Volpe was named as her successor. The Globe and Mail newspaper subsequently published an article which indicated that Sgro believed Volpe wanted her cabinet position, and further asserted that the two were rivals within the party. Volpe denied that he had anything to do with Sgro's resignation and cast doubt on the veracity of the report, saying that Sgro had told him directly that she did not make the statement attributed to her.

Two days after his appointment, Volpe pledged to tighten Canada's refugee system and to accelerate the processing time for individual claimants. He also promised to give illegal immigrant workers the means and opportunity to attain legal status in Canada, although rejecting the option of a blanket amnesty, and pledged to promote regional immigration outside of Canada's major cities. In mid-February 2005, he announced that spouses and common-law partners living in Canada without legal status would be eligible to apply under the family class sponsorship program. In the same period, Volpe asked his department to work on building cases to revoke the citizenship of five suspected Nazi war criminals living in Canada.

In April 2005, Volpe announced that the Martin government would fast-track the admission of 110,000 wage earning immigrants into Canada. He also announced that Canada would try to cut the waiting time for citizenship applications from 18 to 12 months, and that the Martin government would triple the number of parents and grandparents eligible to enter Canada.

In late 2005, Volpe announced that his government would seek a 35% increase in immigration over five years. He noted that there was a pressing need for more skilled immigrants throughout all parts of the country, and suggested that trade skills be emphasized over university education in determining the success of individual applications. Some within the Liberal Party criticized his proposal, arguing that it would be more appropriate to fix current backlogs in the immigration system. Volpe also proposed legislation to make foreign-born adopted children automatic citizens of Canada. After the 2005 Kashmir earthquake, Volpe announced that the Canadian government would take steps to expedite the reunification of families affected by the tragedy.

In November 2005, Volpe released a strategic plan for a national immigration policy following consultation with provincial and territorial leaders. The plan included improved recognition of immigrants with professional skills, such as doctors.

Also in November, the House of Commons Immigration Committee voted 6–5 along party lines to block $168 million in new money for immigration programs. Volpe criticized the opposition committee members for voting down the funding, arguing that their decision would jeopardize several previously announced reforms. Some opposition members argued that Volpe had not adequately justified his department's spending.

One of Volpe's last major acts as Immigration Minister was to announce a $920 million immigration settlement deal with the Government of Ontario on 21 November 2005. Under the terms of the deal, the money was to be earmarked to help immigrants settle, integrate, and become proficient in the English language. In the same week, Volpe also announced the creation of an "in-Canada" economic class of immigrants, making it easier for people on temporary work permits to apply for citizenship. Volpe's department argued that the change would match immigrants with skill shortages, which addressing backlogs in the immigration system.

=== Minister responsible for Ontario and for the Greater Toronto Area ===
In March 2004, Volpe announced the addition of nearly $8 million for existing crime prevention programs in Ontario. In May of the same year, he announced that the federal government would provide $1 billion in funding for GO Transit.

Also in May 2004, Volpe wrote an official letter to Toronto Mayor David Miller, promising that the federal government would not order the construction of a bridge to the Toronto City Centre Airport against the wishes of Toronto City Council. Miller had been elected in the 2003 municipal election on a promise to cancel the bridge, and had previously expressed concern that the federal Toronto Port Authority might authorize its construction even after the city withdrew support. Volpe later expressed concerns about the continued viability of the Toronto Waterfront Revitalization Corp., and emerged as a prominent critic of Miller's plans for waterfront management.

In May 2005, Volpe announced that the federal government would pay $35 million to the Toronto Port Authority to in compensation for the cancellation of the Toronto Island Airport Bridge. In September of the same year, he announced that a 1.4-acre (5,700 m^{2}) piece of waterfront property at Yonge St. and Queen's Quay would remain in public hands. Many regard this property as essential for any future strategy involving comprehensive waterfront renewal.

Volpe remained active with issues of interest to the Italian community in Toronto, and was a prominent supporter of RAI International's bid to receive a television licence in Canada.

=== Views and controversies ===
Volpe reconsidered his position on same-sex marriage in 2004, and voted with the rest of cabinet to grant legal status to same-sex marriages in 2005. Critics accused him of opportunism for changing his position. Volpe responded by arguing that he had played a contributory role in creating balanced legislation that protects the rights of both minority groups and religious institutions.

In May 2005, two Conservative MPs were photographed posing with a poster from the Western Standard with the title "The Liberano$", comparing the Liberal Party to the mafia television show The Sopranos. The poster was sparked by accusations made against the Liberal Party during the federal sponsorship scandal of 2004–05. Volpe argued that the poster was offensive to Canadians of Italian heritage, and commented "These are the same Conservatives who think that every immigrant is a potential terrorist and criminal and everything else", and "Notwithstanding that they don't have their cowl and their cape, the Klan looks like they're still very much alive." The Conservative Party demanded an apology from Volpe, who acknowledged that his words "might have been a little intemperate" because of what he interpreted as a "racial slur".

In September 2005, it was reported that Volpe had claimed $10,891.15 in meal and transportation expenses over an eleven-month period. Opposition MPs argued that this figure was excessive, and noted that Volpe's meal expenses were more than three times higher than his predecessor as Immigration Minister, Judy Sgro, during the same period a year earlier. Volpe argued that his schedule was extremely busy, and that he had to meet with "many stakeholders" in the course of his ministerial duties. There was at least one instance of Volpe charging for two separate meals on the same night. His staff argued that he had made arrangements to meet with two groups of people on the same night, and could not cancel either meeting. In March 2006, the Canadian Taxpayers Federation awarded Volpe with its 8th annual "Teddy" award as the previous year's worst offender in federal government overspending.

== Opposition member, 2006–2011 ==
The three opposition parties united to bring down the Liberal government in late 2005, and a new election was called for January 2006. During the campaign, Volpe and Paul Martin announced that, if re-elected, their government would waive the $975 landing fee charged to immigrants. The Liberals were defeated, however, and the Conservative Party came to office with a minority government. Volpe was again re-elected without difficulty in his own riding. Following the election, he was named as official opposition critic to the President of the Treasury Board.

In early September 2006, Volpe announced that he would break with his party's official position and support a softwood lumber deal negotiated by the Conservative government with the United States of America. In November of the same year, Volpe was one of fifteen Liberal MPs who voted against a resolution from Prime Minister Stephen Harper that recognized the Québécois as a nation within Canada.

=== Leadership candidate ===
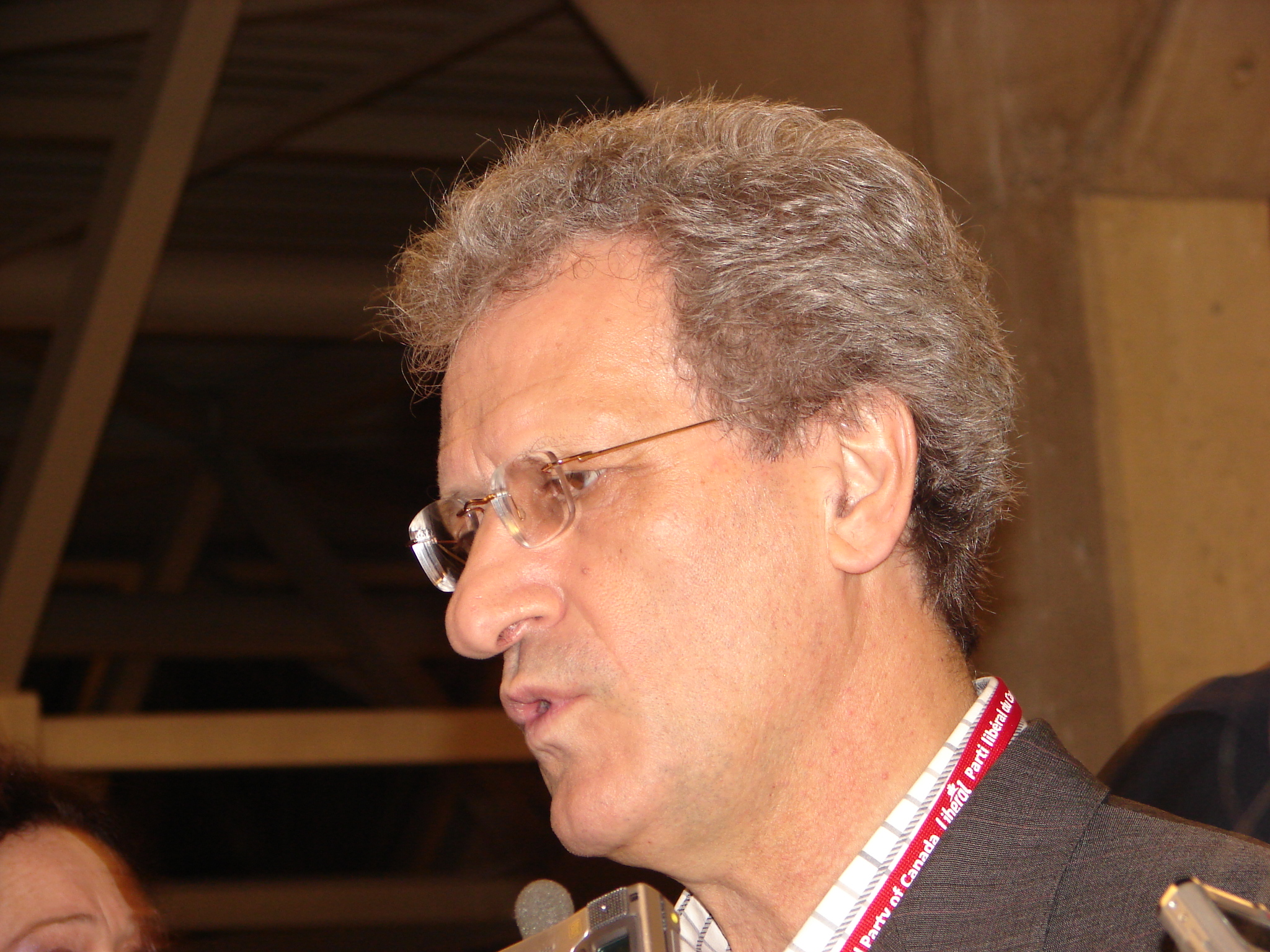
Joe Volpe speaking to the press at the 2006 Liberal leadership convention.

Paul Martin resigned the Liberal leadership after the election, and a new leadership contest was scheduled for late 2006. Volpe announced his candidacy on April 21, 2006. During his campaign launch, he said, "We don't need to re-invent the Party. We just need to give it back to the people who are its rightful owners. We need to take it back from the backroom players who hide behind new faces." He highlighted education and training issues, and said that Canada should be more accommodating to new immigrants. Volpe also argued that Canada should return to a peacekeeping ethos in foreign affairs, rather than primarily engaging in combat missions. After the party's first all-candidates debate, he accused frontrunner Michael Ignatieff of echoing the foreign policy vision of Conservative Prime Minister Stephen Harper.

At the start of his campaign, Volpe was supported by Liberal MPs Jim Karygiannis, Wajid Khan, Yasmin Ratansi, Joe Comuzzi, Sukh Dhaliwal, Massimo Pacetti, and Lui Temelkovski, and former MPs Nick Discepola and Bob Speller. Dhaliwal, Karygiannis and Ratansi later withdrew their support.

==== Apotex donations ====
Volpe's campaign was hindered by controversy. In May 2006, the Canadian media reported that he had received $108,000 in donations from current and former executives of the drug company Apotex Inc., and each of their spouses and children. All of the donations were for $5,400, the maximum allowed for individual donations under the law, while five cheques were in the names of children under eighteen years of age. Companies are banned from donating money to a federal leadership campaign and individuals are prohibited from donating money on behalf of someone else, although donations from minors are not illegal. Critics charged that the Apotex contributions may have been an attempt to sidestep Canada's laws on corporate donations. NDP MP Pat Martin accused Volpe of deliberately orchestrating fraudulent donations and asked the Elections Commissioner to investigate whether "individuals may be trying to circumvent campaign fundraising limits". After Volpe threatened a libel suit, Martin said that his initial accusation was an overstatement but maintained that his call for an investigation was justified. While other parties criticized the donations, Liberal national director Steven MacKinnon stated that the party would not launch an investigation, arguing that it was the responsibility of Elections Canada to regulate donations. The donations were parodied by a website called "YouthForVolpe.ca".

Volpe responded by promising to return any donations that contravened the letter or spirit of the law. He returned the five cheques from minors after extensive media criticism, and denied that any laws had been broken. The controversy nonetheless damaged his candidacy. Sukh Dhaliwal withdrew his support from Volpe after the controversy broke, saying "I think this thing should not happen in any campaign". Other Liberals requested that Volpe withdraw from the contest due to negative publicity, but he said that this was not an option he was considering. In July 2006, Volpe argued that the Federal Accountability Act should be amended to prevent persons under eighteen from contributing to political campaigns.

On December 5, 2006, Elections Canada stated that Volpe had not violated election financing law in accepting the contributions.

==== Other controversies ====
Jim Karygiannis, who had been Volpe's campaign chair, left the campaign on 21 July 2006 after disagreements over Volpe's staunch pro-Israel stance in the 2006 Israel-Lebanon conflict. Soon after his abrupt departure, Karygiannis called the police to prevent a Volpe official from removing computers at the campaign's Scarborough headquarters, which had been leased in Karygiannis's name. No charges were filed. There was speculation that Karygiannis's recruits were more loyal to him than to Volpe, and that his departure would create serious difficulties for Volpe's candidacy.

On October 15, 2006, the Toronto Star reported that the Career Foundation, a federally funded charity serving the unemployed, had paid seven of its clients to work on Volpe's leadership campaign. The Foundation is headquartered in Volpe's Eglinton—Lawrence riding and fell under his purview during his tenure as Minister of Human Resources and Skills Development. The Star article indicated that three Foundation managers objected to paying workers in a partisan political campaign, on the grounds that it was an inappropriate use of taxpayer funds and incompatible with the foundation's charitable status. The Foundation's executive director, Colin Morrison, was quoted as saying that the assignment of clients served a "higher purpose" of "help[ing] unemployed people." Volpe described the Star's report as "a total fiction", and the latest in a series of attempts to derail his campaign.

==== Fine, appeal and exoneration ====
On September 23, 2006, the Liberal Party investigated Volpe's campaign on suspicion of questionable recruitment tactics in Quebec. Volpe had signed up 4,000 new members in the province, more than any other candidate. Several new party members in Montreal were reported as having been improperly registered, and at least nine members were signed up by the Volpe camp without their knowledge or without paying the $10 fee. In two of the cases, the signed-up members were deceased. There was speculation that Volpe would withdraw from the contest after these allegations but he declined to do so, saying that his campaign was not aware of any wrongdoing. Some of Volpe's supporters suggested that Michael Ignatieff's team was running a smear campaign against him. Volpe also argued that his ethnicity may have been a factor in the accusations, suggesting that they came from those who believed he was "not Canadian enough". A similar sentiment was echoed by former Public Works minister Alfonso Gagliano, banned from the party for being implicated in the Sponsorship scandal, who urged Volpe to stay in the race and fight the allegations. Some prominent Liberals, including Scott Reid, were strongly critical of Volpe's response.

The Liberal Party imposed a $20,000 fine on Volpe's campaign in late September, having determined that it provided membership forms to cultural groups without ensuring that new members paid their own fees. Importantly, the panel found no that evidence Volpe or his senior officials knew about the problems. Volpe appealed the decision, arguing the fine was imposed "without due process" and was "designed to inflict as much damage as possible on my campaign immediately prior to the delegate selection meetings."

On October 31, a Liberal Party appeals committee exonerated Volpe of improper membership sales, and withdrew the fine imposed the previous month. He was found guilty of a minor breach of the leadership candidates' code of conduct, and given a nominal fine of $1,000. Volpe accepted the ruling as vindication, and repeated his charge that the previous ruling had a prejudicial effect on delegate selection. He told reporters, "I can't say I'm ecstatic because the damage has already been done". Volpe's reputation in the Liberal Party, damaged by earlier controversies, recovered to some extent after the appeal.

==== Results ====
Volpe fared poorly in the delegate selection meetings, and knew going into the convention that he could not win the leadership. He threw his support behind former Ontario Premier Bob Rae during the convention's "speech night", only moments after the final speech from Michael Ignatieff. This decision did not affect the first ballot of voting, which took place as the speeches were being delivered. Volpe received 156 votes from the convention delegates, finishing in seventh place.

Rae released his delegates after being eliminated on the third ballot. Volpe moved to the camp of Stéphane Dion, who defeated Michael Ignatieff on the fourth ballot to win the party leadership. Volpe and four other MPs who contested the Liberal leadership were named to the frontbench of the Official Opposition in parliament.

== Electoral record ==
2011 Canadian federal election: Eglinton—Lawrence
Party	Candidate	Votes	%	±%	Expenditures
Conservative	Joe Oliver	22,652	46.81	+7.56	
Liberal	Joe Volpe	18,590	38.42	-5.57	
New Democratic	Justin Chatwin	5,613	11.60	+3.18	
Green	Paul Baker	1,534	3.17	-5.17	
Total valid votes		48,389	100.00		
Total rejected ballots		302	0.62	+0.12	
Turnout		48,691	68.02	+8.27	
Conservative gain from Liberal		Swing		+6.57	

Source: Elections Canada

2008 Canadian federal election: Eglinton—Lawrence
Party	Candidate	Votes	%	±%	Expenditures
Liberal	Joe Volpe	19,133	43.99	-8.90	$46,582
Conservative	Joe Oliver	17,073	39.25	+9.00	$82,193
New Democratic	Justin Chatwin	3,663	8.42	-3.07	$4,729
Green	Andrew James	3,629	8.34	+3.22	$6,136
Total valid votes/expense limit		43,498	100.00	$82,294	
Total rejected ballots		219	0.50		
Turnout		43,717	59.75		
Liberal hold		Swing		-8.95	

2006 Canadian federal election: Eglinton—Lawrence
Party	Candidate	Votes	%	±%	Expenditures
Liberal	Joe Volpe	26,044	52.89	−7.35	$66,769
Conservative	Peter Coy	14,897	30.25	+5.20	$59,382
New Democratic	Maurganne Mooney	5,660	11.49	+1.11	$7,722
Green	Patrick Metzger	2,520	5.12	+1.03	$1,338
N/A (Communist League)	John Steele	123	0.25		$369
Total valid votes		49,244	100.00		
Total rejected ballots		245			
Turnout		49,489	67.61	+3.84	
Electors on the lists		73,201			
Sources: Official Results, Elections Canada and Financial Returns, Elections Canada.

2004 Canadian federal election: Eglinton—Lawrence
Party	Candidate	Votes	%	±%	Expenditures
Liberal	Joe Volpe	28,360	60.24	+1.07	$72,089
Conservative	Bernie Tanz	11,792	25.05	−6.88	$71,823
New Democratic	Max Silverman	4,886	10.38	+3.93	$8,534
Green	Shel Goldstein	1,924	4.09		$2,377
Canadian Action	Corrinne Prévost	115	0.24		$0
Total valid votes		47,077	100.00		
Total rejected ballots		284			
Turnout		47,361	63.77		
Electors on the lists		74,266			
Percentage change figures are factored for redistribution. Conservative Party percentages are contrasted with the combined Canadian Alliance and Progressive Conservative percentages from 2000.
Sources: Official Results, Elections Canada and Financial Returns, Elections Canada.

2000 Canadian federal election: Eglinton—Lawrence
Party	Candidate	Votes	%	±%	Expenditures
Liberal	Joe Volpe	25,161	60.68	+1.44	$53,652
Progressive Conservative	Louise Sankey	7,156	17.26	−5.49	$16,232
Alliance	Joel Etienne	5,497	13.26	+5.17	$18,685
New Democratic	Simon Rowland	2,663	6.42	−2.60	$1,577
Green	Doug Howat	688	1.66		$579
Marxist–Leninist	Frank Chilelli	164	0.40		$8
Natural Law	Matthew Macleod	133	0.32	−0.59	$0
Total valid votes		41,462	100.00		
Total rejected ballots		263			
Turnout		41,725	57.58	−9.42	
Electors on the lists		72,463			
Sources: Official Results, Elections Canada and Financial Returns, Elections Canada.

1997 Canadian federal election: Eglinton—Lawrence
Party	Candidate	Votes	%	±%	Expenditures
Liberal	Joe Volpe	25,985	59.24	−4.07	$49,531
Progressive Conservative	David Rotenberg	9,977	22.75	+5.11	$34,874
New Democratic	Sam Savona	3,955	9.02	+4.36	$14,088
Reform	Charles Van Tuinen	3,547	8.09	−3.65	$10,529
Natural Law	Robyn Brandon	397	0.91		$0
Total valid votes		43,861	100.00		
Total rejected ballots		320			
Turnout		44,181	67.00		
Electors on the lists		65,945			
Percentage change figures are factored for redistribution.
Sources: Official Results, Elections Canada and Financial Returns, Elections Canada.

1993 Canadian federal election: Eglinton—Lawrence
Party	Candidate	Votes	%	±%	Expenditures
Liberal	Joe Volpe	28,634	71.62	+20.60	$38,419
Reform	Charles Van Tuinen	4,347	10.87		$13,413
Progressive Conservative	Marc Monson	4,262	10.66	−20.28	$19,954
New Democratic Party	Gael Hepworth	2,091	5.23	−10.34	$12,165
Natural Law	Debbie Weberg	384	0.96		$0
Marxist–Leninist	Jeanne Gatley	138	0.35		$105
Abolitionist	Linda Kruschel	124	0.31		$0
Total valid votes		39,980	100.00		
Total rejected ballots		480			
Turnout		40,460	68.28	−6.48	
Electors on the lists		59,254			
Source: Thirty-fifth General Election, 1993: Official Voting Results, Published by the Chief Electoral Officer of Canada. Financial figures taken from official contributions and expenses provided by Elections Canada.

1988 Canadian federal election: Eglinton—Lawrence
Party	Candidate	Votes	%	±%	Expenditures
Liberal	Joe Volpe	20,446	51.02	+8.04	$33,611
Progressive Conservative	Tony Abbott	12,400	30.94	−9.35	$26,187
New Democratic	Vittoria Levi	6,241	15.57	+0.68	$16,036
Libertarian	Sandor L. Hegedus	538	1.34	+0.51	$0
Communist	Geoffrey da Silva	208	0.52	+0.02	$357
Revolutionary; Workers League	Margaret Manwaring	123	0.31		$776
Commonwealth of Canada	James Felicioni	122	0.30		$67
Total valid votes		40,078	100.00		
Total rejected ballots		565			
Turnout		40,643	74.76		
Electors on the lists		54,362			

1981 Ontario general election: Downsview
Party	Candidate	Votes	%	Expenditures
New Democratic	Odoardo Di Santo	8,644	39.10	$14,984
Liberal	Joe Volpe	7,991	36.14	$17,106
Progressive Conservative	Ross Charles	5,475	24.76	$15,229
Total valid votes		22,110	100.00	
Total rejected ballots		185		
Turnout		22,295	58.54	
Electors on the lists		38,086		

1974 Toronto municipal election: North York Board of Education, Separate School Representative (Area One)
Candidate	Votes	%
Peter Caruso	2,393	38.77
(x)William Higgins	1,919	31.09
Joe Volpe	1,860	30.14
Total valid votes	6,172	100.00

All federal electoral information is taken from Elections Canada. Italicized expenditures from elections after 1997 refer to submitted totals, and are presented when the final reviewed totals are not available. Expenditures from 1997 refer to submitted totals.

All provincial election information is taken from Elections Ontario.

The 1974 municipal result is taken from the Toronto Star, 3 December 1974, A11. The final official result was not significantly different.

== Post politics ==
Since his election defeat Volpe became publisher of Corriere Canadese, an Italian-Canadian daily newspaper based in Toronto revived by Volpe and several other investors in 2013.

Volpe published an article in Corriere Canadese on January 8, 2021 questioning the decision of the Toronto Catholic District School Board to list YouthLine, an LGBTQ mental health resource, on its website, but YouthLine called his comments "homophobic, transphobic and anti-LGBTQ". In April 2021, Volpe filed a 30-million dollar defamation suit against Kristyn Wong-Tam and Paul Ainslie, as well as four Toronto Catholic District School Board Trustees and Yahoo Canada. In May 2022, Volpe's lawsuit was dismissed in the Ontario Superior Court of Justice after the defendants requested dismissal under the anti-SLAPP provisions of Ontario's Courts of Justice Act.

27th Canadian Ministry (2003–2006) – Cabinet of Paul Martin
Cabinet posts (2)
Predecessor	Office	Successor
Judy Sgro	Minister of Citizenship and Immigration; 2005–2006	Monte Solberg
position created in 2003	Minister of Human Resources and Skills Development; 2003–2005	Lucienne Robillard
