= Toronto North (federal electoral district) =

Former federal electoral district in Ontario, Canada

Ontario electoral district
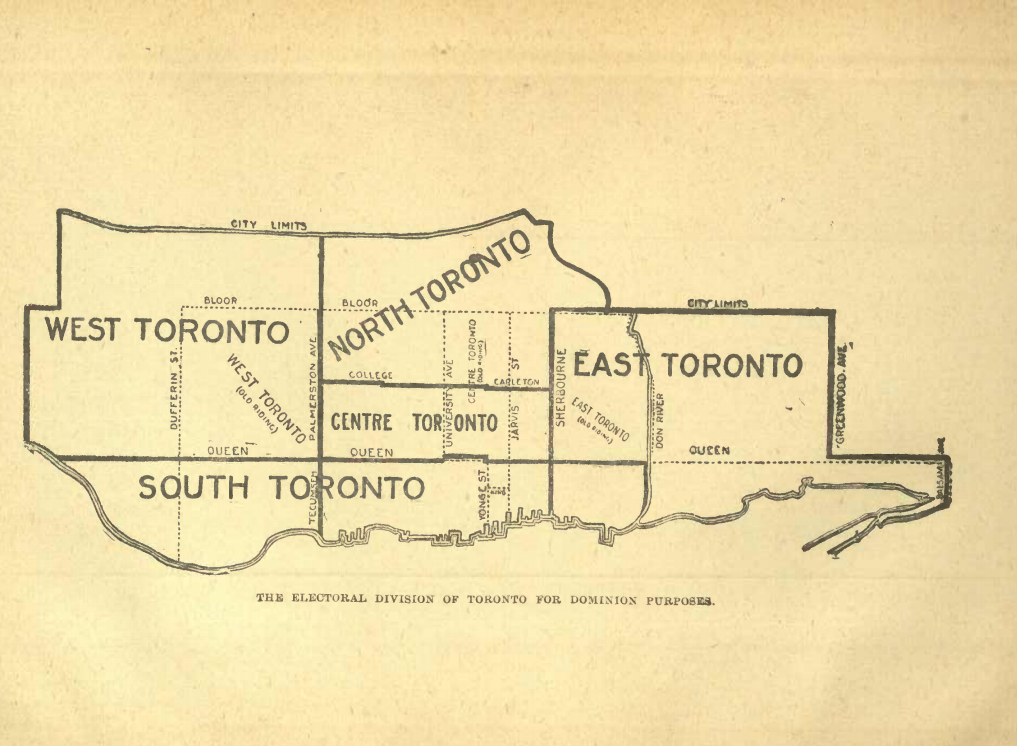
- A map of the Toronto ridings of 1904

Defunct federal electoral district
- Legislature: House of Commons
- District created: 1903
- District abolished: 1924
- First contested: 1904
- Last contested: 1921

Toronto North was a federal electoral district represented in the House of Commons of Canada from 1904 to 1925. It was located in the city of Toronto in the province of Ontario. This riding was created in 1903 from parts of Toronto Centre, West Toronto and York East ridings.

It consisted of the part of the city of Toronto between Palmerston and Spadina Avenues in the west, and Sherbourne Street in the east and north of College and Carleton Streets, plus the part of the city east of Sherbourne and north of Bloor Street. In 1914, it was redefined to consist of the part of the city of Toronto east of Oakwood and Dovercourt Roads and north of Bloor Street.

The electoral district was abolished in 1924 when it was redistributed between Toronto Northeast and Toronto Northwest and York West ridings.

== Members of Parliament ==
This riding has elected the following members of Parliament:

Parliament	Years	Member	Party
Riding created from Toronto Centre, West Toronto and York East
10th	1904–1908	George Eulas Foster	Conservative
11th	1908–1911	George Eulas Foster	Conservative
12th	1911–1917	George Eulas Foster	Conservative
13th	1917–1921	George Eulas Foster	Government (Unionist)
14th	1921–1925	Thomas Langton Church	Conservative
Riding dissolved into Toronto Northeast and Toronto Northwest

== Election history ==
1904 Canadian federal election: Toronto North
Party	Candidate	Votes	%	±%
Conservative	George Eulas Foster	4,422		
Liberal	Thomas Urquhart	4,310		

1908 Canadian federal election: Toronto North
Party	Candidate	Votes	%	±%
Conservative	Hon. George Eulas Foster	4,398		
Liberal	William Henry Shaw	4,009		

1911 Canadian federal election: Toronto North
Party	Candidate	Votes	%	±%
Conservative	Hon. George Eulas Foster	6,474		
Liberal	William Henry Shaw	3,157		

By-election: On Mr. Foster being appointed Minister of Trade and Commerce, 27 October 1911: Toronto North
Party	Candidate	Votes	%	±%
Conservative	Hon. G. E. Foster	acclaimed		

1917 Canadian federal election: Toronto North
Party	Candidate	Votes	%	±%
Government (Unionist)	Rt. Hon. Sir George Foster	21,130		
Opposition–Labour	Alfred James Young	2,893		

1921 Canadian federal election: Toronto North
Party	Candidate	Votes	%	±%
Conservative	Thomas Langton Church	12,412		
Liberal	Robert Rennie	8,452		

== See also ==
- List of Canadian electoral districts
- Historical federal electoral districts of Canada
