= Toronto Northeast (federal electoral district) =

Former federal electoral district in Ontario, Canada

Ontario electoral district

Defunct federal electoral district
- Legislature: House of Commons
- District created: 1924
- District abolished: 1933
- First contested: 1925
- Last contested: 1930

Toronto Northeast was a federal electoral district represented in the House of Commons of Canada from 1925 to 1935. It was located in the city of Toronto in the province of Ontario. This riding was created in 1924 from parts of Toronto North and York South ridings.

It consisted of the part of the city of Toronto north of Bloor Street, and east of Bathurst Street.

The electoral district was abolished in 1933 when it was redistributed between Eglinton, Rosedale, Spadina and St. Paul's ridings.

== Members of Parliament ==
This riding has elected the following members of Parliament:

Parliament	Years	Member	Party
Riding created from Toronto North and York South
15th	1925–1926	Richard Langton Baker	Conservative
16th	1926–1930	Newton Manly Young	Conservative
17th	1930–1935	Richard Langton Baker	Conservative
Riding dissolved into Eglinton, Rosedale, Spadina and St. Paul's

== Election history ==
1925 Canadian federal election: Toronto Northeast
Party	Candidate	Votes	%	±%
Conservative	Richard Langton Baker	20,877		
Liberal	Albert Edward Matthews	8,073		

1926 Canadian federal election: Toronto Northeast
Party	Candidate	Votes	%	±%
Conservative	Newton Manly Young	11,005		
Conservative	Richard Langton Baker	9,639		
Liberal	Thomas James Pugh	5,994		

1930 Canadian federal election: Toronto Northeast
Party	Candidate	Votes	%	±%
Conservative	Richard Langton Baker	16,979		
Liberal	George Alexander Urquhart	10,701		

== See also ==
- List of Canadian electoral districts
- Historical federal electoral districts of Canada
