= Eglinton (federal electoral district) =

Former federal electoral district in Ontario, Canada

Ontario electoral district

Defunct federal electoral district
- Legislature: House of Commons
- District created: 1933
- District abolished: 1976
- First contested: 1935
- Last contested: 1974

Eglinton was a federal electoral district in Ontario, Canada, that was represented in the House of Commons of Canada from 1935 to 1979. This riding was created in 1933 from parts of Toronto Northeast riding.

It initially consisted of Ward Nine of the city of Toronto.

In 1966, it was redefined to consist of the part of Metropolitan Toronto bounded as follows: from the intersection of the Canadian National Railway (CNR) line and Yonge Street, north along Yonge Street, west along Cameron Avenue, north along Easton Street, west along Sheppard Avenue West, south along Bathurst Street, southwest along Highway 401, south along the Spadina Expressway, Beechmount Avenue and Benner Avenue, east along Briar Hill Avenue, south along Castlewood Road, east along Eglinton Avenue, south along Elmsthorpe Avenue, and southeast along the CNR line to Yonge Street.

The electoral district was abolished in 1976 when it was redistributed between Eglinton—Lawrence, St. Paul's and Willowdale ridings.

== Members of Parliament ==
This riding has elected the following members of Parliament:

Parliament	Years	Member	Party
Riding created from Toronto Northeast
18th	1935–1940	Richard Langton Baker	Conservative
19th	1940–1945	Frederick Hoblitzell	Liberal
20th	1945–1949	Donald Fleming	Progressive Conservative
21st	1949–1953	Donald Fleming	Progressive Conservative
22nd	1953–1957	Donald Fleming	Progressive Conservative
23rd	1957–1958	Donald Fleming	Progressive Conservative
24th	1958–1962	Donald Fleming	Progressive Conservative
25th	1962–1963	Donald Fleming	Progressive Conservative
26th	1963–1965	Mitchell Sharp	Liberal
27th	1965–1968	Mitchell Sharp	Liberal
28th	1968–1972	Mitchell Sharp	Liberal
29th	1972–1974	Mitchell Sharp	Liberal
30th	1974–1978	Mitchell Sharp	Liberal
30th	1978–1979	Rob Parker	Progressive Conservative
Riding dissolved into Eglinton—Lawrence, St. Paul's and Willowdale

== Election results ==
1935 Canadian federal election
Party	Candidate	Votes
Conservative	Richard Langton Baker	13,786
Liberal	Egerton Lovering	9,574
Reconstruction	A. Carman Douglas	5,868
Co-operative Commonwealth	Ben H. Spence	2,474

1940 Canadian federal election
Party	Candidate	Votes
Liberal	Frederick Hoblitzell	17,166
National Government	Richard Langton Baker	16,926

1945 Canadian federal election
Party	Candidate	Votes
Progressive Conservative	Donald Fleming	21,476
Liberal	Frederick William Rayfield	13,586
Co-operative Commonwealth	Russell Gee	4,435
Labor–Progressive	Leslie Varley	382
Social Credit	Edgar Shipley Birrell	367

1949 Canadian federal election
Party	Candidate	Votes
Progressive Conservative	Donald Fleming	19,853
Liberal	Jack Roy Longstaffe	16,426
Co-operative Commonwealth	David Cass-Beggs	4,305

1953 Canadian federal election
Party	Candidate	Votes
Progressive Conservative	Donald Fleming	17,354
Liberal	Jack Roy Longstaffe	11,190
Co-operative Commonwealth	Douglas Weldon McEntee	2,337

1957 Canadian federal election
Party	Candidate	Votes
Progressive Conservative	Donald Fleming	25,046
Liberal	Albert John Wilson	9,468
Co-operative Commonwealth	Gwenyth Grube	2,765
Liberal Conservative Coalition	George Rolland	252

1958 Canadian federal election
Party	Candidate	Votes
Progressive Conservative	Donald Fleming	28,565
Liberal	Albert J. Wilson	9,468
Co-operative Commonwealth	Gwenyth Grube	2,646

1962 Canadian federal election
Party	Candidate	Votes
Progressive Conservative	Donald Fleming	18,648
Liberal	Mitchell Sharp	17,888
New Democratic	David Gauthier	4,113
Social Credit	Basil Duggan	341

1963 Canadian federal election
Party	Candidate	Votes
Liberal	Mitchell Sharp	22,215
Progressive Conservative	Eric Hardy	13,984
New Democratic	Malcolm Bowles Mitchell	5,151

1965 Canadian federal election
Party	Candidate	Votes
Liberal	Mitchell Sharp	18,719
Progressive Conservative	Dalton Camp	16,777
New Democratic	Malcolm Mitchell	5,538

1968 Canadian federal election
Party	Candidate	Votes
Liberal	Mitchell Sharp	23,215
Progressive Conservative	Murray R. Maynard	11,155
New Democratic	James T. Lemon	4,654
Independent	Arthur L. B. Smialowski	164

1972 Canadian federal election
Party	Candidate	Votes
Liberal	Mitchell Sharp	19,389
Progressive Conservative	Murray R. Maynard	17,819
New Democratic	Eleanor Pelrine	5,245
Not affiliated	Hardial Bains	132

1974 Canadian federal election
Party	Candidate	Votes
Liberal	Mitchell Sharp	19,951
Progressive Conservative	Murray Maynard	16,812
New Democratic	Betty Kehoe	3,798
Communist	Shane Parkhill	137
Independent	Kate A. Alderice	110
Marxist–Leninist	Hardial Bains	60

On Mr. Sharp's resignation, 2 May 1978:

By-election on 16 October 1978
Party	Candidate	Votes
Progressive Conservative	Rob Parker	19,485
Liberal	Doris Anderson	7,996
New Democratic	Jim Tait	2,246

== See also ==
- List of Canadian electoral districts
- Historical federal electoral districts of Canada
