= Yamaska (disambiguation) =

Yamaska, Quebec is a place in Canada.

Yamaska may also refer to:

- Yamaska (federal electoral district)
- Yamaska (provincial electoral district)
- Yamaska (Province of Canada electoral district)
- Yamaska River, in Quebec
- Mont Yamaska, part of the Monteregian Hills in Quebec
- Yamaska (TV series), a French-Canadian drama

== See also ==
- Yamaska National Park
