= 20th Canadian Parliament =

1945–49 national legislative term

- Minority parliament
- Sep. 6, 1945 – Apr. 30, 1949

Parliament leaders
- Prime minister: William Lyon Mackenzie King; Oct. 23, 1935 – Nov. 15, 1948
- Louis St. Laurent; Nov. 15, 1948 – Jun. 21, 1957
- Cabinets: 16th Canadian Ministry; 17th Canadian Ministry
- Leader of the Opposition: John Bracken; 11 June 1945 – 20 July 1948
- George A. Drew; 2 October 1948 – 1 November 1954

Party caucuses
- Government: Liberal Party
- Opposition: Progressive Conservative Party
- Crossbench: Co-operative Commonwealth Federation
- Social Credit Party
- Bloc populaire
- Labor-Progressive Party

House of Commons
- Seating arrangements of the House of Commons
- Speaker of the Commons: Gaspard Fauteux; 6 September 1945 – 14 September 1949
- Government House leader: Ian Alistair Mackenzie; 14 October 1944 – 30 April 1948
- Alphonse Fournier; 1 May 1948 – 9 May 1953
- Members: 245 MP seats List of members

Senate
- Speaker of the Senate: James Horace King; 24 August 1945 – 2 August 1949
- Government Senate leader: Wishart McLea Robertson; 24 August 1945 – 14 October 1953
- Opposition Senate leader: Charles Colquhoun Ballantyne; 16 January 1942 – 11 September 1945
- John Thomas Haig; 12 September 1945 – 20 June 1957

Sovereign
- Monarch: George VI; 11 December 1936 – 6 February 1952
- Governor general: Alexander Cambridge; 21 June 1940 – 12 April 1946
- Harold Alexander; 12 April 1946 – 28 January 1952

Sessions
- 1st session 6 September 1945 – 18 December 1945
- 2nd session 14 March 1946 – 31 August 1946
- 3rd session 30 January 1947 – 17 July 1947
- 4th session 5 December 1947 – 30 June 1948
- 5th session 29 January 1949 – 30 April 1949
← 19th	→ 21st

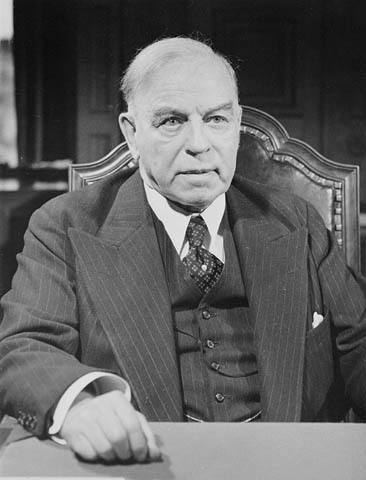
William Lyon Mackenzie King (pictured here in 1945) was Prime Minister during the first three years of the 20th Canadian Parliament.

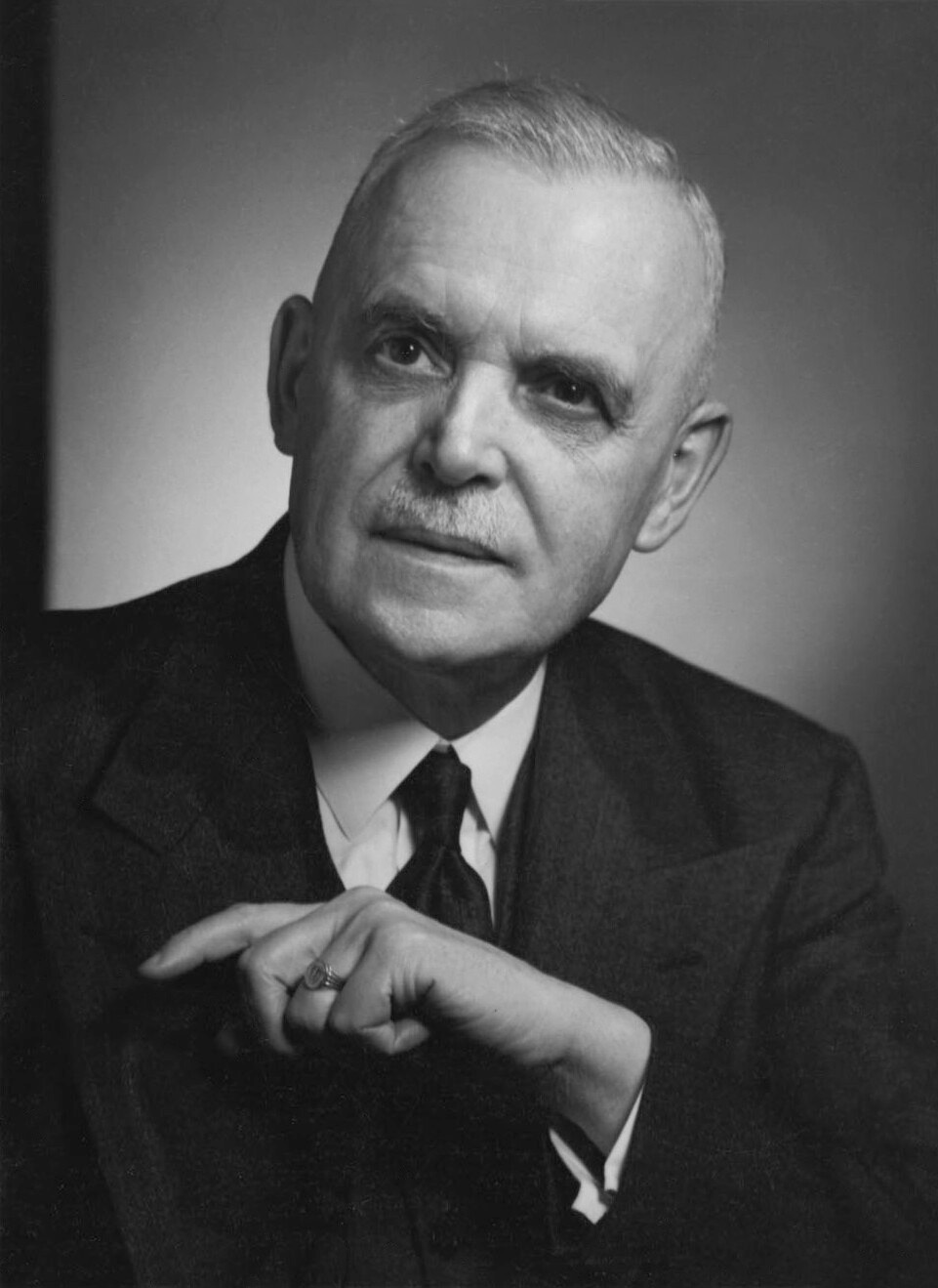
Louis St. Laurent (pictured here in 1948) was Prime Minister during the final year of the 20th Canadian Parliament.

The 20th Canadian Parliament was in session from 6 September 1945, until 30 April 1949. The membership was set by the 1945 federal election on 11 June 1945, and it changed only somewhat due to resignations and by-elections until it was dissolved prior to the 1949 election.

There were five sessions of the 20th Parliament:

Session	Start	End
1st	September 6, 1945	December 8, 1945
2nd	March 14, 1946	August 31, 1946
3rd	January 30, 1947	July 17, 1947
4th	December 5, 1947	December 5, 1947
5th	January 29, 1949	April 30, 1949

== Overview ==
It was controlled by a Liberal Party minority first under Prime Minister William Lyon Mackenzie King and the 16th Canadian Ministry, and later a majority under Prime Minister Louis St. Laurent and the 17th Canadian Ministry. The Official Opposition was the newly named Progressive Conservative Party, led first by John Bracken and later by George Drew.

The Speaker was Gaspard Fauteux. See also List of Canadian electoral districts 1933-1947 for a list of the ridings in this parliament.

== Party Standings ==
Number of members per party	Party leader	General Election
Number of members per party	Party leader	June 11, 1945
Liberal	William Lyon Mackenzie King	118
Progressive Conservative	John Bracken	66
Co-operative Commonwealth	M.J. Coldwell	28
Social Credit	Solon Low	13
Other		20
Total Seats		245

== Major events ==
=== Advancement of the CFF ===
In this parliament, the Co-operative Commonwealth Federation, led by M. J. Coldwell, overtook the Social Credit as third largest party.

== Ministry ==
The 17th Canadian Ministry began at the end of the 20th Canadian Parliament, was sustained through the 21st Canadian Parliament, and lasted until near the end of the 22nd Canadian Parliament.

== Officeholders ==
=== Head of State ===
Office	Photo	Name	Assumed office	Left office
Sovereign		George VI	December 6, 1936	February 6, 1952
Governor General		Alexander Cambridge, 1st Earl of Athlone	June 21, 1940	April 12, 1946
Governor General		Harold Alexander, 1st Earl Alexander of Tunis	April 12, 1946	January 28, 1952

=== Party leadership ===
Party	Photo	Name	Assumed office	Left office
Liberal		William Lyon Mackenzie King	December 29, 1921	June 28, 1926
Liberal		William Lyon Mackenzie King	September 26, 1926	August 7, 1930
Liberal		William Lyon Mackenzie King	October 23, 1935	November 15, 1948
Liberal		Louis St. Laurent	August 7, 1948	January 16, 1958
Progressive Conservative		John Bracken	December 11, 1942	July 20, 1948
CCF		M.J. Coldwell	July 29, 1942	August 10, 1960
Social Credit		Solon Earl Low	April 6, 1944	March 9, 1967

== Changes to party standings ==
=== By-elections ===
By-election	Date	Incumbent	Party	Winner	Party	Cause	Retained
Nicolet—Yamaska	February 7, 1949	Lucien Dubois	Independent Liberal	Renaud Chapdelaine	Progressive Conservative	Death	No
Carleton	December 20, 1948	George Russell Boucher	Progressive Conservative	George A. Drew	Progressive Conservative	Resignation to provide a seat for Drew	Yes
Laval—Two Mountains	December 20, 1948	Liguori Lacombe	Independent	Léopold Demers	Liberal	Resignation	No
Marquette	December 20, 1948	James Allison Glen	Liberal	Stuart Sinclair Garson	Liberal	Resignation	Yes
Digby—Annapolis—Kings	December 13, 1948	James Lorimer Ilsley	Liberal	George Clyde Nowlan	Progressive Conservative	Resignation	No
Algoma East	October 25, 1948	Thomas Farquhar	Liberal	Lester B. Pearson	Liberal	Called to the Senate	Yes
Rosthern	October 25, 1948	Walter Adam Tucker	Liberal	William Albert Boucher	Liberal	Resignation	Yes
Ontario	June 8, 1948	W. E. N. Sinclair	Liberal	Arthur Henry Williams	CCF	Death	No
Vancouver Centre	June 8, 1948	Ian Alistair Mackenzie	Liberal	Rodney Young	CCF	Called to the Senate	No
Yale	May 31, 1948	Grote Stirling	Progressive Conservative	Owen Lewis Jones	CCF	Resignation	No
York—Sunbury	October 20, 1947	H. Francis G. Bridges	Liberal	Milton Gregg	Liberal	Death	Yes
Halifax	July 14, 1947	William Chisholm Macdonald	Liberal	John Dickey	Liberal	Death	Yes
Cartier	March 31, 1947	Fred Rose	Labor-Progressive	Maurice Hartt	Liberal	Seat declared vacant by resolution of the House of Commons	No
Richelieu—Verchères	December 23, 1946	Arthur Cardin	Independent	Gérard Cournoyer	Liberal	Death	No
Parkdale	October 21, 1946	Herbert A. Bruce	Progressive Conservative	Harold Timmins	Progressive Conservative	Resignation	Yes
Portage la Prairie	October 21, 1946	Harry Leader	Liberal	Calvert Charlton Miller	Progressive Conservative	Death	No
Pontiac	September 16, 1946	Wallace McDonald	Liberal	Réal Caouette	Social Credit	Death	No
Glengarry	August 6, 1945	William B. MacDiarmid	Liberal	William Lyon Mackenzie King	Liberal	Resignation to provide a seat for Mackenzie King	Yes

== Parliamentarians ==
=== House of Commons ===
Following is a full list of members of the twentieth Parliament listed first by province, then by electoral district.

Key:

- Party leaders are italicized.
- Parliamentary assistants is indicated by "‡".
- Cabinet ministers are in **boldface**.
- The Prime Minister is **both**.
- The Speaker is indicated by "(†)".

Electoral districts denoted by an asterisk (*) indicates that district was represented by two members.

=== Alberta ===
Electoral district	Name	Party	First elected/previously elected	No. of terms
Acadia	Victor Quelch	Social Credit	1935	3rd term
Athabaska	Joseph Miville Dechene	Liberal	1940	2nd term
Battle River	Robert Fair	Social Credit	1935	3rd term
Bow River	Charles Edward Johnston	Social Credit	1935	3rd term
Calgary East	Douglas Harkness	Progressive Conservative	1945	1st term
Calgary West	Arthur LeRoy Smith	Progressive Conservative	1945	1st term
Camrose	James Alexander Marshall	Social Credit	1935	3rd term
Edmonton East	Patrick Harvey Ashby	Social Credit	1945	1st term
Edmonton West	**James Angus MacKinnon**	Liberal	1935	3rd term
Jasper—Edson	Walter Frederick Kuhl	Social Credit	1935	3rd term
Lethbridge	John Horne Blackmore	Social Credit	1935	3rd term
Macleod	Ernest George Hansell	Social Credit	1935	3rd term
Medicine Hat	William Duncan Wylie	Social Credit	1945	1st term
Peace River	Solon Earl Low	Social Credit	1945	1st term
Red Deer	Frederick Davis Shaw	Social Credit	1940	2nd term
Vegreville	Anthony Hlynka	Social Credit	1940	2nd term
Wetaskiwin	Norman Jaques	Social Credit	1935	3rd term

=== British Columbia ===
Electoral district	Name	Party	First elected/previously elected	No. of terms
Cariboo	William Irvine	CCF	1921, (Note: East Calgary (Alberta) (First elected as a Labour)) 1926, (Note: Wetaskiwin (Alberta) (First elected as United Farmers)) 1945	4th term*
Comox—Alberni	John Lambert Gibson	Independent Liberal	1945	1st term
Fraser Valley	George Cruickshank	Liberal	1940	2nd term
Kamloops	Davie Fulton	Progressive Conservative	1945	1st term
Kootenay East	James Herbert Matthews	CCF	1945	1st term
Kootenay West	Herbert Wilfred Herridge	Independent CCF	1945	1st term
Kootenay West	Herbert Wilfred Herridge	CCF	1945	1st term
Nanaimo	George Pearkes	Progressive Conservative	1945	1st term
New Westminster	Thomas Reid ‡	Liberal	1930	4th term
Skeena	Harry Archibald	CCF	1945	1st term
Vancouver—Burrard	Charles Merritt	Progressive Conservative	1945	1st term
Vancouver Centre	**Ian Alistair Mackenzie** (until 19 January 1948 Senate appointment)	Liberal	1930	4th term
Vancouver Centre	Rodney Young (by-election of 8 June 1948)	CCF	1948	1st term
Vancouver East	Angus MacInnis	CCF	1930	4th term
Vancouver North	James Sinclair ‡	Liberal	1940	2nd term
Vancouver South	Howard Charles Green	Progressive Conservative	1935	3rd term
Victoria	**Robert Mayhew** ‡	Liberal	1937	3rd term
Yale	Grote Stirling (resigned 21 October 1947)	Progressive Conservative	1924	7th term
Yale	Owen Jones (by-election of 31 May 1948)	CCF	1948	1st term

=== Manitoba ===
Electoral district	Name	Party	First elected/previously elected	No. of terms
Brandon	James Ewen Matthews	Liberal	1938	3rd term
Churchill	Ronald Stewart Moore	CCF	1945	1st term
Dauphin	Fred Zaplitny	CCF	1945	1st term
Lisgar	Howard Winkler	Liberal	1935	3rd term
Macdonald	William Gilbert Weir	Liberal-Progressive	1930	4th term
Marquette	**James Allison Glen** (resigned 4 November 1948)	Liberal	1926, (Note: First elected as a Liberal-Progressive) 1935	4th term*
Marquette	**Stuart Garson** (by-election of 20 December 1948)	Liberal	1948	1st term
Neepawa	John Bracken	Progressive Conservative	1945	1st term
Portage la Prairie	Harry Leader (died 9 May 1946)	Liberal	1921, (Note: First elected as a Progressive) 1935	4th term*
Portage la Prairie	Calvert Charlton Miller (by-election of 21 October 1946)	Progressive Conservative	1946	1st term
Provencher	René Jutras	Liberal	1940	2nd term
Selkirk	William Bryce	CCF	1943	2nd term
Souris	J. Arthur Ross	Progressive Conservative	1940	2nd term
Springfield	John Sinnott	Liberal	1945	1st term
St. Boniface	Fernand Viau	Liberal	1945	1st term
Winnipeg North	Alistair Stewart	CCF	1945	1st term
Winnipeg North Centre	Stanley Knowles	CCF	1942	2nd term
Winnipeg South	Leslie Mutch ‡	Liberal	1935	3rd term
Winnipeg South Centre	Ralph Maybank ‡	Liberal	1935	3rd term

=== New Brunswick ===
Electoral district	Name	Party	First elected/previously elected	No. of terms
Charlotte	A. Wesley Stuart	Liberal	1945	1st term
Gloucester	Clovis-Thomas Richard	Liberal	1945	1st term
Kent	Aurel Léger	Liberal	1940	2nd term
Northumberland	John William Maloney	Liberal	1945	1st term
Restigouche—Madawaska	Benoît Michaud	Liberal	1945	1st term
Royal	Alfred Johnson Brooks	Progressive Conservative	1935	3rd term
St. John—Albert	King Hazen	Progressive Conservative	1940	2nd term
Victoria—Carleton	Heber Harold Hatfield	Progressive Conservative	1940	2nd term
Westmorland	Henry Read Emmerson	Liberal	1935	3rd term
York—Sunbury	**Hedley Francis Gregory Bridges** (died in office)	Liberal	1945	1st term
York—Sunbury	**Milton Fowler Gregg** (by-election of 20 October 1947)	Liberal	1947	1st term

=== Nova Scotia ===
Electoral district	Name	Party	First elected/previously elected	No. of terms
Antigonish—Guysborough	J. Ralph Kirk	Liberal	1936	3rd term
Cape Breton North and Victoria	Matthew MacLean	Liberal	1937	3rd term
Cape Breton South	Clarence Gillis	CCF	1940	2nd term
Colchester—Hants	Frank Thomas Stanfield	Progressive Conservative	1945	1st term
Cumberland	Percy Chapman Black	Progressive Conservative	1940	2nd term
Digby—Annapolis—Kings	**James Lorimer Ilsley** (resigned 27 October 1948)	Liberal	1926	5th term
Digby—Annapolis—Kings	George Nowlan (by-election of 13 December 1948)	Progressive Conservative	1948	1st term
Halifax*	Gordon Benjamin Isnor	Liberal	1935	3rd term
Halifax*	William Chisholm Macdonald ‡ (died 19 November 1946)	Liberal	1940	2nd term
Halifax*	John Dickey (by-election of 14 July 1947, replaces Macdonald)	Liberal	1947	1st term
Inverness—Richmond	Moses Elijah McGarry	Liberal	1940	2nd term
Pictou	Henry Byron McCulloch	Liberal	1935	3rd term
Queens—Lunenburg	**Robert Winters** ‡	Liberal	1945	1st term
Shelburne—Yarmouth—Clare	Loran Ellis Baker ‡	Liberal	1945	1st term

=== Ontario ===
Electoral district	Name	Party	First elected/previously elected	No. of terms
Algoma East	Thomas Farquhar (until 10 September 1948 Senate appointment)	Liberal	1935	3rd term
Algoma East	**Lester B. Pearson** (by-election of 25 October 1948)	Liberal	1948	1st term
Algoma West	George E. Nixon	Liberal	1940	2nd term
Brantford City	William Ross Macdonald	Liberal	1935	3rd term
Brant	John A. Charlton	Progressive Conservative	1945	1st term
Broadview	Thomas Langton Church	Progressive Conservative	1921, (Note: Toronto North/Toronto Northwest) 1934	7th term*
Bruce	Andrew Ernest Robinson	Progressive Conservative	1945	1st term
Carleton	George Russell Boucher (resigned 1 November 1948)	Progressive Conservative	1940	2nd term
Carleton	George Drew (by-election of 20 December 1948)	Progressive Conservative	1948	1st term
Cochrane	Joseph-Arthur Bradette	Liberal	1926	5th term
Danforth	Joseph Henry Harris	Progressive Conservative	1921	7th term
Davenport	John Ritchie MacNicol	Progressive Conservative	1930	4th term
Dufferin—Simcoe	William Earl Rowe	Progressive Conservative	1925	6th term
Durham	Charles Elwood Stephenson	Progressive Conservative	1945	1st term
Eglinton	Donald Fleming	Progressive Conservative	1945	1st term
Elgin	Charles Delmer Coyle	Progressive Conservative	1945	1st term
Essex East	**Paul Martin Sr.**	Liberal	1935	3rd term
Essex South	Murray Clark	Liberal	1935	3rd term
Essex West	Donald Ferguson Brown	Liberal	1945	1st term
Fort William	Dan McIvor	Liberal	1935	3rd term
Frontenac—Addington	Wilbert Ross Aylesworth	Progressive Conservative	1940	2nd term
Glengarry	William MacDiarmid (resigned 22 June 1945)	Liberal	1940	2nd term
Glengarry	**William Lyon Mackenzie King** (by-election of 6 August 1945)	Liberal	1908, (Note: Waterloo North) 1919, (Note: Prince (PEI)/York North) 1926, (Note: Prince Albert (Saskatchewan)) 1945	9th term*
Greenwood	Denton Massey	Progressive Conservative	1935	3rd term
Grenville—Dundas	Arza Clair Casselman	Progressive Conservative	1921, 1925	7th term*
Grey—Bruce	Walter Harris	Liberal	1940	2nd term
Grey North	W. Garfield Case	Progressive Conservative	1945	2nd term
Haldimand	Mark Senn	Progressive Conservative	1921	7th term
Halton	Hughes Cleaver	Liberal	1935	3rd term
Hamilton East	Thomas Hambly Ross	Liberal	1940	2nd term
Hamilton West	**Colin Gibson**	Liberal	1940	2nd term
Hastings—Peterborough	George Stanley White	Progressive Conservative	1940	2nd term
Hastings South	George Henry Stokes	Progressive Conservative	1940	2nd term
High Park	William Alexander McMaster	Progressive Conservative	1945	1st term
Huron North	Elston Cardiff	Progressive Conservative	1940	2nd term
Huron—Perth	William Henry Golding	Liberal	1932	4th term
Kenora—Rainy River	William Moore Benidickson	Liberal	1945	1st term
Kent	Earl Desmond	Progressive Conservative	1940	2nd term
Kingston City	Thomas Kidd	Progressive Conservative	1945	1st term
Lambton—Kent	Robert James Henderson	Progressive Conservative	1945	1st term
Lambton West	Joseph Warner Murphy	Progressive Conservative	1945	1st term
Lanark	William Gourlay Blair	Progressive Conservative	1945	1st term
Leeds	George Webb	Progressive Conservative	1945	1st term
Lincoln	Norman Lockhart	Progressive Conservative	1935	3rd term
London	Park Manross	Progressive Conservative	1945	1st term
Middlesex East	Harry Oliver White	Progressive Conservative	1945	1st term
Middlesex West	Robert McCubbin ‡	Liberal	1940	2nd term
Muskoka—Ontario	James Macdonnell	Progressive Conservative	1945	1st term
Nipissing	Léo Gauthier	Liberal	1945	1st term
Norfolk	Theobald Butler Barrett	Progressive Conservative	1945	1st term
Northumberland	Earle Drope	Progressive Conservative	1945	1st term
Ontario	W. E. N. Sinclair (died in office)	Liberal	1945	1st term
Ontario	Arthur Henry Williams (by-election of 8 June 1948)	CCF	1948	1st term
Ottawa East	Jean-Thomas Richard	Liberal	1945	1st term
Ottawa West	George McIlraith ‡	Liberal	1940	2nd term
Oxford	Kenneth Daniel	Progressive Conservative	1945	1st term
Parkdale	Herbert Alexander Bruce (until resignation)	Progressive Conservative	1940	2nd term
Parkdale	Harold Timmins (by-election of 21 October 1946)	Progressive Conservative	1946	1st term
Parry Sound	Wilfred McDonald	Liberal	1945	1st term
Peel	Gordon Graydon	Progressive Conservative	1935	3rd term
Perth	Albert Bradshaw	Progressive Conservative	1945	1st term
Peterborough West	Gordon Fraser	Progressive Conservative	1940	2nd term
Port Arthur	**Clarence Decatur Howe**	Liberal	1935	3rd term
Prescott	Élie-Oscar Bertrand	Liberal	1929	5th term
Prince Edward—Lennox	George Tustin	Progressive Conservative	1935	3rd term
Renfrew North	Ralph Warren	Liberal	1937	3rd term
Renfrew South	**James Joseph McCann**	Liberal	1935	3rd term
Rosedale	Harry Jackman	Progressive Conservative	1940	2nd term
Russell	Joseph-Omer Gour	Liberal	1945	1st term
St. Paul's	Douglas Ross	Progressive Conservative	1935	3rd term
Simcoe East	William Alfred Robinson	Liberal	1945	1st term
Simcoe North	Julian Ferguson	Progressive Conservative	1945	1st term
Spadina	David Croll	Liberal	1945	1st term
Stormont	**Lionel Chevrier**	Liberal	1935	3rd term
Timiskaming	Walter Little	Liberal	1935	3rd term
Trinity	Larry Skey	Progressive Conservative	1945	1st term
Victoria	Clayton Hodgson	Progressive Conservative	1945	1st term
Waterloo North	Louis Orville Breithaupt	Liberal	1940	2nd term
Waterloo South	Karl Kenneth Homuth	Progressive Conservative	1938	3rd term
Welland	**Humphrey Mitchell**	Liberal	1931, (Note: Hamilton East (First elected as a Labour)) 1942	3rd term*
Wellington North	Lewis Menary	Progressive Conservative	1945	1st term
Wellington South	Robert Gladstone	Liberal	1935	3rd term
Wentworth	Frank Lennard	Progressive Conservative	1935, 1945	2nd term*
York East	Robert Henry McGregor	Progressive Conservative	1926	5th term
York North	Jack Smith	Liberal	1945	1st term
York South	Alan Cockeram	Progressive Conservative	1940, 1945	2nd term*
York West	Agar Rodney Adamson	Progressive Conservative	1940	2nd term

=== Prince Edward Island ===
Electoral district	Name	Party	First elected/previously elected	No. of terms
King's	Thomas Vincent Grant	Liberal	1935	3rd term
Prince	John Watson MacNaught ‡	Liberal	1945	1st term
Queen's*	James Lester Douglas	Liberal	1940	2nd term
Queen's*	Chester McLure	Progressive Conservative	1930, 1945	2nd term*

=== Quebec ===
Electoral district	Name	Party	First elected/previously elected	No. of terms
Argenteuil	Georges Héon	Independent Progressive Conservative	1938, 1945	2nd term*
Beauce	Ludger Dionne	Liberal	1945	1st term
Beauharnois—Laprairie	Maxime Raymond	Bloc populaire canadien	1925 (Note: First elected as a Liberal)	6th term
Bellechasse	Louis-Philippe Picard	Liberal	1940	2nd term
Berthier—Maskinongé	Aldéric Laurendeau	Liberal	1945	1st term
Bonaventure	Bona Arsenault	Independent	1945	1st term
Brome—Missisquoi	Maurice Hallé	Liberal	1940	2nd term
Cartier	Fred Rose (seat declared vacant 30 January 1947, by House of Commons)	Labor-Progressive	1943	2nd term
Cartier	Maurice Hartt (by-election of 31 March 1947)	Liberal	1947	1st term
Chambly—Rouville	Roch Pinard	Liberal	1945	1st term
Champlain	Hervé-Edgar Brunelle	Liberal	1935	3rd term
Chapleau	David Gourd	Liberal	1945	1st term
Charlevoix—Saguenay	Frédéric Dorion	Independent	1942	2nd term
Châteauguay—Huntingdon	Donald Elmer Black	Liberal	1935	3rd term
Chicoutimi	Paul-Edmond Gagnon	Independent	1945	1st term
Compton	Joseph-Adéodat Blanchette ‡	Liberal	1935	3rd term
Dorchester	Léonard Tremblay	Liberal	1935	3rd term
Drummond—Arthabaska	Armand Cloutier	Liberal	1940	2nd term
Gaspé	Léopold Langlois	Liberal	1945	1st term
Hochelaga	Raymond Eudes	Liberal	1940	2nd term
Hull	**Alphonse Fournier**	Liberal	1930	4th term
Jacques Cartier	Elphège Marier	Liberal	1939	3rd term
Joliette—l'Assomption—Montcalm	Georges-Émile Lapalme	Liberal	1945	1st term
Kamouraska	Eugène Marquis	Liberal	1945	1st term
Labelle	Maurice Lalonde	Liberal	1935	3rd term
Lake St-John—Roberval	Joseph-Alfred Dion	Independent Liberal	1945	1st term
Laurier	**Ernest Bertrand**	Liberal	1935	3rd term
Laval—Two Mountains	Liguori Lacombe (resigned 12 July 1948)	Independent	1925, 1935	5th term*
Laval—Two Mountains	Léopold Demers (by-election of 20 December 1948)	Liberal	1948	1st term
Lévis	Maurice Bourget	Independent Liberal	1940	2nd term
Lotbinière	Hugues Lapointe ‡	Liberal	1940	2nd term
Maisonneuve—Rosemont	Sarto Fournier	Liberal	1935	3rd term
Matapédia—Matane	Philéas Côté	Independent Liberal	1945	1st term
Mégantic—Frontenac	Joseph Lafontaine	Liberal	1940	2nd term
Mercier	**Joseph Jean**	Liberal	1932	4th term
Montmagny—L'Islet	Jean Lesage	Liberal	1945	1st term
Mount Royal	Fred Whitman	Liberal	1940	2nd term
Nicolet—Yamaska	Lucien Dubois (died 8 November 1948)	Independent Liberal	1930	4th term
Nicolet—Yamaska	Renaud Chapdelaine (by-election of 7 February 1949)	Progressive Conservative	1949	1st term
Outremont	Édouard Rinfret	Liberal	1945	1st term
Pontiac	Wallace McDonald (died 2 May 1946)	Liberal	1935	3rd term
Pontiac	Réal Caouette (by-election of 16 September 1946)	Social Credit	1946	1st term
Portneuf	Pierre Gauthier	Liberal	1936	3rd term
Québec—Montmorency	Wilfrid Lacroix	Independent Liberal	1935	3rd term
Quebec East	**Louis St. Laurent**	Liberal	1942	2nd term
Quebec South	Charles Gavan Power	Liberal	1917	8th term
Quebec West and South	Charles Parent	Independent Liberal	1935	3rd term
Richelieu—Verchères	Arthur Cardin (died 21 October 1946)	Independent	1911	9th term
Richelieu—Verchères	Gérard Cournoyer (by-election of 23 December 1946)	Liberal	1946	1st term
Richmond—Wolfe	James Patrick Mullins	Liberal	1935	3rd term
Rimouski	Gleason Belzile ‡	Liberal	1945	1st term
St. Ann	Thomas Healy	Liberal	1940	2nd term
St. Antoine—Westmount	**Douglas Abbott**	Liberal	1940	2nd term
St. Denis	Azellus Denis	Liberal	1935	3rd term
St. Henry	Joseph-Arsène Bonnier	Liberal	1938	3rd term
St. Hyacinthe—Bagot	Joseph Fontaine	Liberal	1945	1st term
St. James	Roland Beaudry	Liberal	1945	1st term
St. Johns—Iberville—Napierville	Alcide Côté	Liberal	1945	1st term
St. Lawrence—St. George	**Brooke Claxton**	Liberal	1940	2nd term
St. Mary	Gaspard Fauteux (†)	Liberal	1942	2nd term
St-Maurice—Laflèche	René Hamel	Bloc populaire canadien	1945	1st term
Shefford	Marcel Boivin	Liberal	1945	1st term
Sherbrooke	Maurice Gingues	Liberal	1940	2nd term
Stanstead	John Thomas Hackett	Progressive Conservative	1930, 1945	2nd term*
Témiscouata	Jean-François Pouliot	Independent Liberal	1924	7th term
Témiscouata	Jean-François Pouliot	Liberal	1924	7th term
Terrebonne	Lionel Bertrand	Liberal	1940	2nd term
Trois-Rivières	Wilfrid Gariépy	Independent	1935, 1945	2nd term*
Vaudreuil—Soulanges	Louis-René Beaudoin	Liberal	1945	1st term
Verdun	Paul-Émile Côté ‡	Liberal	1940	2nd term
Wright	Léon Raymond	Liberal	1945	1st term

=== Saskatchewan ===
Electoral district	Name	Party	First elected/previously elected	No. of terms
Assiniboia	Edward McCullough	CCF	1945	1st term
Humboldt	Joseph William Burton	CCF	1935	3rd term
Kindersley	Frank Jaenicke	CCF	1945	1st term
Lake Centre	John Diefenbaker	Progressive Conservative	1940	2nd term
Mackenzie	Alexander Malcolm Nicholson	CCF	1940	2nd term
Maple Creek	Duncan John McCuaig	CCF	1945	1st term
Melfort	Percy Wright	CCF	1940	2nd term
Melville	**James Garfield Gardiner**	Liberal	1936	3rd term
Moose Jaw	Ross Thatcher	CCF	1945	1st term
North Battleford	Frederick Townley-Smith	CCF	1945	1st term
Prince Albert	Edward LeRoy Bowerman	CCF	1945	1st term
Qu'Appelle	Gladys Strum	CCF	1945	1st term
Regina City	John Probe	CCF	1945	1st term
Rosetown—Biggar	Major James Coldwell	CCF	1935	3rd term
Rosthern	Walter Tucker ‡ (resigned 8 June 1948)	Liberal	1935	3rd term
Rosthern	William Albert Boucher (by-election of 25 October 1948)	Liberal	1948	1st term
Saskatoon City	Roy Knight	CCF	1945	1st term
Swift Current	Thomas John Bentley	CCF	1945	1st term
The Battlefords	Max Campbell	CCF	1945	1st term
Weyburn	Eric McKay	CCF	1945	1st term
Wood Mountain	Hazen Argue	CCF	1945	1st term
Yorkton	George Hugh Castleden	CCF	1940	2nd term

=== Yukon ===
Electoral district	Name	Party	First elected/previously elected	No. of terms
Yukon	George Black	Progressive Conservative	1921, 1940	6th term*
