= Gladu =

Gladu is a surname. Notable people with the surname include:

- Camille Gladu (1872–1921) Canadian politician from Ontario
- Claude Gladu (born 1942), Canadian politician from Quebec
- Jean-Paul Gladu (1921–2015), Canadian ice hockey player
- Marilyn Gladu (born 1962), Canadian politician
- Oscar Gladu (1870–1920), Canadian politician
- Roland Gladu (1911–1994), Canadian baseball player
- Victor Gladu (1844–1897), Canadian notary and politician from Quebec
