= Aimé Boucher =

Canadian politician (1877–1946)

Member of the Canadian Parliament for Yamaska
- In office 1921–1935
- Preceded by: Oscar Gladu
- Succeeded by: electoral district was abolished in 1933, when it was re-distributed into Nicolet—Yamaska, Drummond—Arthabaska and Richelieu—Verchères

Personal details
- Born: July 23, 1877 Pierreville, Quebec, Canada
- Died: September 9, 1946 (aged 69)
- Party: Liberal
- Occupation: Civil law notary

Aimé Boucher (July 23, 1877 – September 9, 1946) was a Canadian politician and notary. He represented riding of Yamaska in the House of Commons of Canada.

Boucher was the son of Wilfrid G. Boucher and Sophia Gill. He was educated at the Seminaire de Nicolet. In 1917, he married Marguerite, the daughter of Jules Allard. He was elected to the House of Commons in 1921 in a by-election as a Member of the Liberal Party to represent Yamaska. Boucher was re-elected in 1921, 1925, 1926, 1930 and 1933 after the last election was declared void in 1932.
