= Moïse Fortier =

Canadian politician

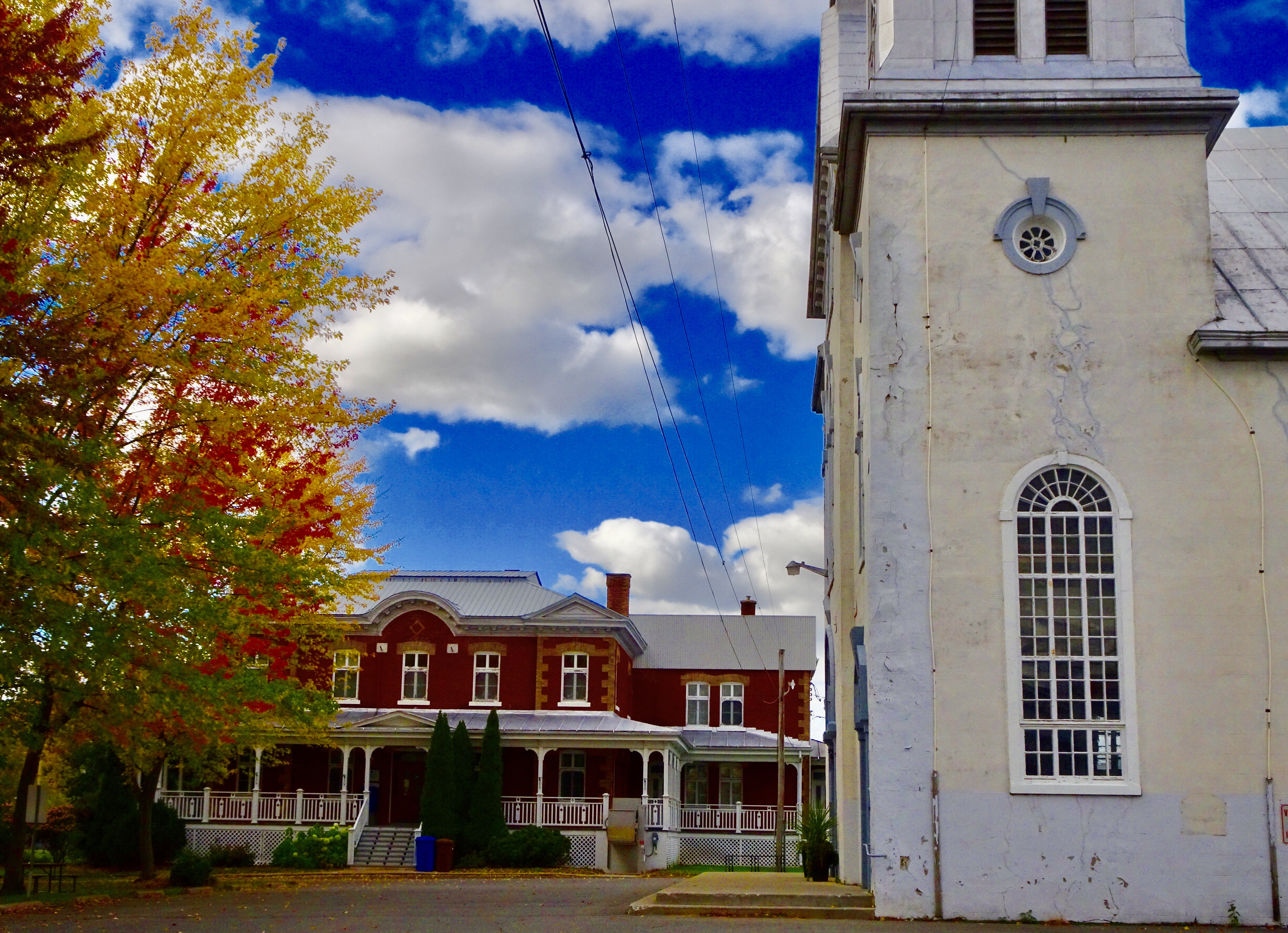
City Town Hall of Saint-David, Yamaska

Moïse (Moyse) Fortier (November 6, 1815 – October 17, 1877) was a Quebec businessman and member of Parliament. He was a Liberal member of the House of Commons of Canada representing Yamaska from 1867 to 1872, defeating Joseph Provencher.

He was born in Saint-Léon in 1815, the son of Charles Fortier and Felecite Blais.

He became a merchant at Saint-David-d'Yamaska and was also president of the Richelieu, Drummond and Arthabaska Railway, later acquired by the Canadian Pacific Railway. He served as mayor of Saint-David for 22 years.

In 1861, he was elected to the Legislative Assembly of the Province of Canada in Yamaska; he was re-elected in 1863 and was elected to the Canadian House of Commons after the Canadian Confederation, which created a new country named Canada.

He died at Saint-David-d'Yamaska in 1877. He was married to Mathilde Paradis, by whom he had 11 children, one of which was Dr. L.-A. Fortier, who married to Marie-Antoinette Lambert, daughter of Mary Victoria Yale and Major F.-X. Lambert.

Dr. Fortier's sons were lawyer Maurice Fortier and King's Counsel Jacob Yale Fortier, great-grandsons of Major George Henry Yale, 1st Mayor of Louiseville. Others brothers of Fortier included merchant J. J. O Fortier, Dr. Alma Fortier and Rev. Jacob Fortier, Vicar of Yamachiche.

His sisters married to notary Charles Archambault and Dr. Brousseau.

Parliament of Canada
Preceded by None	Member of Parliament from Yamaska; 1867–1872	Succeeded by Joseph Duguay
