= Clément Vincent =

Canadian politician

- Official 1966 portrait

Member of the Canadian Parliament for Nicolet—Yamaska
- In office 1962–1966
- Preceded by: Paul Comtois
- Succeeded by: Florian Côté

Member of the National Assembly of Quebec for Nicolet
- In office 1966–1973
- Preceded by: Germain Hébert
- Succeeded by: District abolished in 1972

Personal details
- Born: May 18, 1931 Sainte-Perpétue, Quebec
- Died: April 4, 2018 (aged 86) Drummondville, Quebec
- Party: Progressive Conservative
- Other political affiliations: Union Nationale
- Cabinet: Provincial: Minister of Agriculture and Colonization (1966-1970)

Clément Vincent (May 18, 1931 – April 4, 2018) was a Canadian politician and a Member of the House of Commons of Canada.

== Background ==
He was born on May 18, 1931, in Sainte-Perpétue, Centre-du-Québec. He was a farmer and an entrepreneur.

== Mayor ==
Vincent served as Mayor of Sainte-Perpétue from January 19, 1959, to January 11, 1961.

== Member of Parliament ==
He successfully ran as a Progressive Conservative candidate for the district Nicolet—Yamaska in the 1962 federal election. He was re-elected in the 1963 and 1965 elections, but resigned in 1966 to enter provincial politics.

== Provincial politics ==
Vincent won a seat to the Legislative Assembly of Quebec in 1966 in the district of Nicolet. He supported the Union Nationale and was appointed to the Cabinet, serving as Minister of Agriculture and Colonization from 1966 to 1970. He was re-elected in the 1970 election, but was defeated in the district of Nicolet-Yamaska in the 1973 election.

== Retirement ==
From 1978 to 1983, Vincent was employed by the Chief Electoral Officer of Quebec. Vincent died on 4 April 2018 at the age of 86.
