= Charles-Ignace Gill =

Canadian politician (1844–1901)

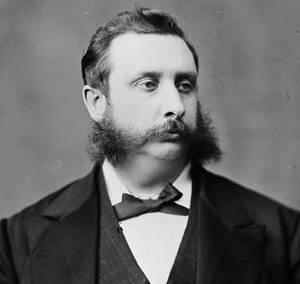

Member of the Canadian Parliament for Yamaska
- In office 1874–1879
- Preceded by: Joseph Duguay
- Succeeded by: Fabien Vanasse dit Vertefeuille

Member of the Legislative Assembly of Quebec for Yamaska
- In office 1871–1874
- Preceded by: Louis-Adélard Senécal
- Succeeded by: Joseph Nestor Duguay

Personal details
- Born: March 12, 1844 Saint-François-du-Lac, Canada East
- Died: September 16, 1901 (aged 57) Montreal, Quebec
- Relations: Ignace Gill, father Louis-Adélard Senécal, father-in-law

Charles-Ignace Gill (March 12, 1844 – September 16, 1901) was a Quebec lawyer and political figure. He represented Yamaska in the Legislative Assembly of Quebec from 1871 to 1874 and in the House of Commons of Canada as a Conservative member from 1874 to 1879.

He was born in Saint-François-du-Lac, Canada East in 1844, the son of Ignace Gill and studied at the Collège de Nicolet and the Université Laval. He articled in law with Ulric-Joseph Tessier, was admitted to the bar in 1867 and set up practice at Sorel. In 1870, he married Marie-Rosalie-Delphine, the daughter of Louis-Adélard Senécal. In 1871, he was elected to the provincial assembly. He resigned in 1874 to run for a seat in the House of Commons. He resigned in 1879 when he was named as a judge to the Quebec Superior Court in Richelieu district; in 1886, he was named to Montreal district. He was also a director of the Montreal, Portland and Boston Railway.

He died in Montreal in 1901.
