= Fabien Vanasse dit Vertefeuille =

Canadian politician

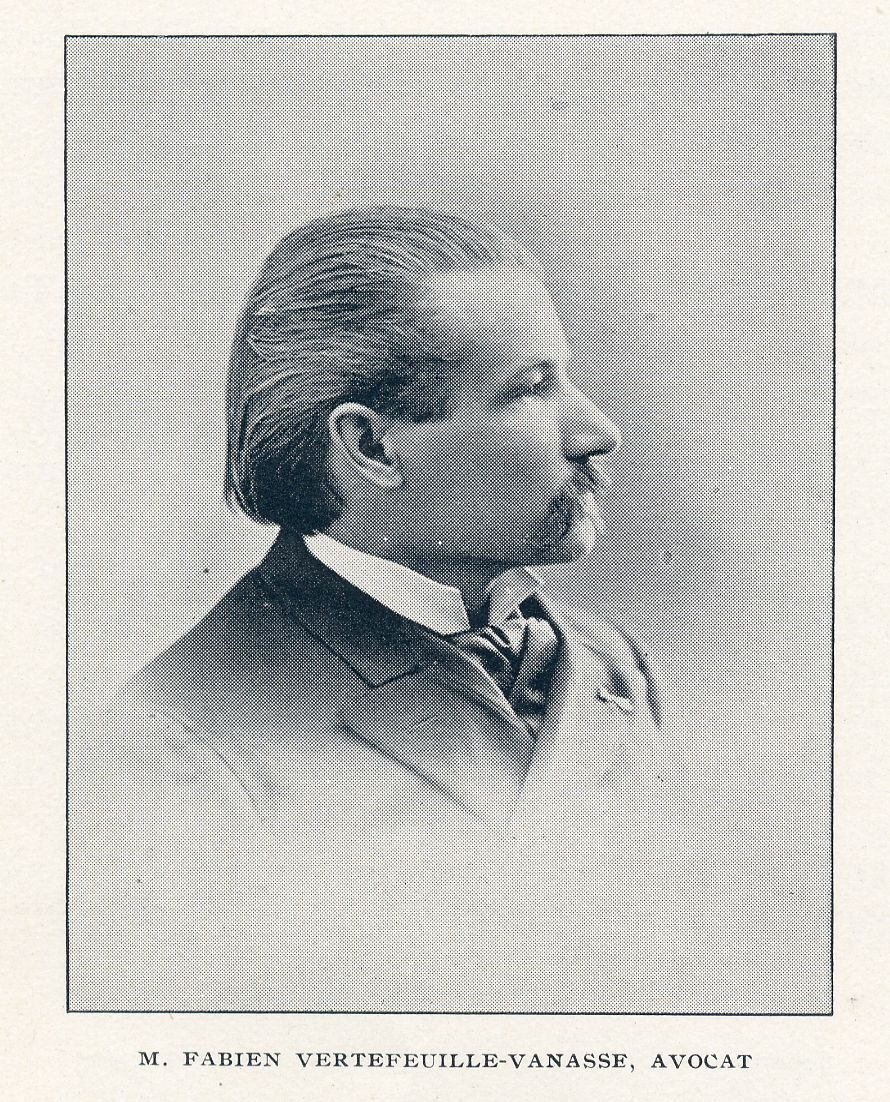

Fabien Vanasse dit Vertefeuille (November 6, 1850 – December 3, 1936) was a journalist, lawyer and political figure in Quebec, Canada. He represented Yamaska in the House of Commons of Canada from 1879 to 1891 as a Conservative Party of Canada member.

He was born in St-David d'Yamaska, Canada East, the son of François-Xavier Vanasse dit Vertefeuille and Angelique Dupuis. He was educated at the Séminaire de Nicolet, was called to the Montreal bar in 1875 and set up practice in Montreal. In 1877, he married Mary Claire Elmire Desève. Vanasse dit Vertfeuille was first elected to the House of Commons in an 1879 by-election held after Charles-Ignace Gill was named to the Quebec Superior Court. He ran unsuccessfully for reelection in 1891 and 1896. Vanasse dit Vertfeuille was president of "L'Institut Legal" of Montreal and secretary and then vice-president for the Club Cartier. He was president of "La compagnie d'imprimerie et de publication du Canada", which published the Montreal newspaper Le Monde and served as the paper's editor. He also contributed to the weekly journal L'Opinion Publique, the French-language version of the Canadian Illustrated News. He served as historian for the Arctic expeditions led by Captain Joseph-Elzear Bernier in 1908–9. Vanasse dit Vertfeuille represented the National Archives of Canada in Paris from 1913 to 1924.
