= Lucien Dubois =

Canadian politician

Member of Parliament for Nicolet
- In office July 1930 – October 1935
- Preceded by: Joseph-Félix Descoteaux
- Succeeded by: riding dissolved

Member of Parliament for Nicolet—Yamaska
- In office October 1935 – April 1945
- Preceded by: riding created
- Succeeded by: Renaud Chapdelaine

Personal details
- Born: 30 April 1893 Gentilly, Quebec, Canada
- Died: 8 November 1948 (aged 55)
- Party: Liberal; Independent Liberal
- Profession: farmer

Lucien Dubois (30 April 1893 – 8 November 1948) was a Liberal party and Independent Liberal member of the House of Commons of Canada. He was born in Gentilly, Quebec and became a farmer by career.

Dubois was educated at Arthabaska College. He was also author of a history of Gentilly.

He was first elected to Parliament at the Nicolet riding in the 1930 general election. He was re-elected in 1935 when his riding was changed to Nicolet—Yamaska. He was re-elected there in 1940 and 1945. Dubois died unexpectedly on 8 November 1948 before the end of his term in the 20th Canadian Parliament, although he was reported to have had health problems for the last eight years of his life. Dubois was never married.
