= Yamaska (Province of Canada electoral district) =

Electoral district in former Province of Canada

Yamaska Canada East
Province of Canada electoral district

Defunct pre-Confederation electoral district
- Legislature: Legislative Assembly of the Province of Canada
- District created: 1841
- District abolished: 1867
- First contested: 1841
- Last contested: 1863

Yamaska was an electoral district of the Legislative Assembly of the Parliament of the Province of Canada, in Canada East, in a rural area south of the Saint Lawrence River. It was created in 1841, based on the previous electoral district of the same name for the Legislative Assembly of Lower Canada.

Yamaska was represented by one member in the Legislative Assembly. It was abolished in 1867, upon the creation of Canada and the province of Quebec.

== Boundaries ==
Yamaska electoral district was located in a rural area on the south shore of the Saint Lawrence River (now in an area contained in Nicolet-Yamaska Regional County Municipality). The Saint François River ran north through the district, flowing into the Saint Lawrence.

The Union Act, 1840 merged the two provinces of Upper Canada and Lower Canada into the Province of Canada, with a single Parliament. The separate parliaments of Lower Canada and Upper Canada were abolished. The Union Act provided that the pre-existing electoral boundaries of Lower Canada and Upper Canada would continue to be used in the new Parliament, unless altered by the Union Act itself.

The Lower Canada electoral district of Yamaska was not altered by the Act. It was therefore continued with the same boundaries in the new Parliament. Those boundaries had been set by a statute of Lower Canada in 1829:

The County of Yamaska shall be bounded on the east by the County of Nicolet, on the west by the County of Richelieu as hereinafter described, on the north by the River St. Lawrence, and on the south by the rear lines of the seigniories of Courval, Pierreville and Deguire or Riviere David, and shall comprehend the whole extent of the seigniories of La Baie du Febvre, Courval, Lussaudiere, Pierre-ville, Saint François and the augmentation thereof, Lavalliere, otherwise called Saint Michel d'Yamaska and Deguire.

== Members of the Legislative Assembly (1841–1867) ==
Yamaska was a single-member constituency.

The following were the members of the Legislative Assembly for Yamaska. The party affiliations are based on the biographies of individual members given by the National Assembly of Quebec, as well as votes in the Legislative Assembly. "Party" was a fluid concept, especially during the early years of the Province of Canada.

| Parliament | Members | Years in Office | Party |
|---|---|---|---|
| 1st Parliament; 1841–1844 | Joseph-Guillaume Barthe | 1841–1844 | Anti-unionist; French-Canadian Group |
| 2nd Parliament; 1844–1847 | Léon Rousseau | 1844–1847 | French-Canadian Group |
| 3rd Parliament; 1848–1851 | Michel Fourquin | 1848–1851 | Ministerialist |
| 4th Parliament; 1851–1854 | Pierre-Benjamin Dumoulin | 1851–1854 | Ministerialist |
| 5th Parliament; 1854–1857 | Ignace Gill | 1854–1861 | Bleu |
| 6th Parliament; 1858–1861 | Ignace Gill | 1854–1861 | Bleu |
| 7th Parliament; 1861–1863 | Moïse Fortier | 1861–1867 | Rouge |
| 8th Parliament; 1863–1867 | Moïse Fortier | 1861–1867 | Anti-Confederation; Rouge |

== Abolition ==
The district was abolished on July 1, 1867, when the British North America Act, 1867 came into force, creating Canada and splitting the Province of Canada into Quebec and Ontario. It was succeeded by electoral districts of the same name in the House of Commons of Canada and the Legislative Assembly of Quebec.

== See also ==
- Yamaska (federal electoral district)
- Yamaska (provincial electoral district)
- List of elections in the Province of Canada
