= Louis-Adélard Senécal =

Canadian politician (1829–1887)

The Hon. Louis-Adélard Senécal
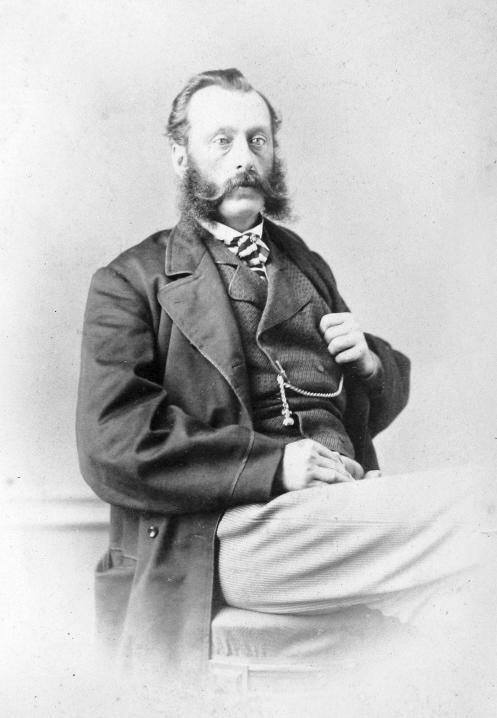
- Louis-Adélard Senécal, 1866

Member of the Canadian Parliament for Drummond—Arthabaska
- In office 1867–1872
- Succeeded by: Pierre-Nérée Dorion

Member of the Legislative Assembly of Quebec for Yamaska
- In office 1867–1871
- Succeeded by: Charles-Ignace Gill

Senator for Mille Isles, Quebec
- In office January 25, 1887 – October 11, 1887
- Preceded by: Louis-Rodrigue Masson
- Succeeded by: Jean-Baptiste Rolland

Personal details
- Born: July 10, 1829 Varennes, Lower Canada
- Died: October 11, 1887 (aged 58) Montreal, Quebec
- Party: Conservative
- Other political affiliations: Liberal Party of Quebec

Louis-Adélard Senécal (July 10, 1829 – October 11, 1887) was a Quebec businessman and political figure. He was a Conservative member in the 1st Canadian Parliament representing Drummond—Arthabaska, represented Yamaska in the Legislative Assembly of Quebec from 1867 to 1871 and was a member of the Senate of Canada for Mille Isles division in 1887.

He was born Louis-Adélard Sénécal in Varennes, Lower Canada in 1829 and then moved to Verchères with his family while still very young. In 1850, he set up a general store there with a partner. The following year, he entered the business of selling grain with his father. He declared bankruptcy the following year due to debts incurred earlier; his father and wife helped him settle these debts. In 1853, in partnership with his father and others, he became the owner and captain of a steamship travelling between Verchères and Montreal. The company acquired additional vessels and Senécal formed partnerships with a number of other shipping companies transporting goods in the region. He also speculated in land and was involved in the operation of sawmills and flour mills. In 1867, he was forced to declare personal bankruptcy. This did not affect the Pierreville Steam Mills Company, of which he was a part owner. However, he was forced to sell his share in the company after a series of fires left him short of liquid assets.

He was elected to both the provincial and federal legislatures in 1867. During the 1870s, he expanded into railway construction, building the Richelieu, Drummond and Arthabaska Counties Railway. His son-in-law, Charles-Ignace Gill, a member of the Legislative Assembly of Quebec, helped provide Senécal with the required political connections for railway construction and also looked after some of Senécal's other business interests while he was otherwise occupied. In 1880, he was named superintendent for the Quebec, Montreal, Ottawa and Occidental Railway; sections of this railway were later sold to the Canadian Pacific Railway and the Grand Trunk Railway. Senécal was also treasurer for the Parti conservateur du Québec during this period which many saw as a conflict of interest because of the heavy government involvement in railways at the time. During the 1880s, he was also president of the Montreal City Passenger Railway Company, the North Shore Railway and the Richelieu and Ontario Navigation Company. In 1883, he received the cross of commander in the French Légion d'honneur.

He was named to the Senate in January 1887 but died in Montreal later that year. He was entombed at the Notre Dame des Neiges Cemetery in Montreal.

1867 Canadian federal election: Drummond—Arthabaska
Party	Candidate	Votes
Conservative	Louis-Adélard Sénécal	1,135
Unknown	M. Houle	1,111
Eligible voters		4,028
Source: Canadian Parliamentary Guide, 1871
