= Paul Comtois =

Canadian politician and lieutenant governor

The Honourable Paul Comtois PC

21st Lieutenant Governor of Quebec
- In office October 12, 1961 – February 21, 1966
- Monarch: Elizabeth II
- Governor General: Georges Vanier
- Premier: Jean Lesage
- Preceded by: Onésime Gagnon
- Succeeded by: Hugues Lapointe

Member of the Canadian Parliament for Nicolet—Yamaska
- In office June 10, 1957 – October 12, 1961
- Preceded by: Maurice Boisvert
- Succeeded by: Clément Vincent

Personal details
- Born: August 22, 1895 Pierreville, Quebec
- Died: February 21, 1966 (aged 70) Sillery, Quebec
- Party: Progressive Conservative
- Relations: Charles-Ignace Gill, great-uncle
- Cabinet: Minister of Mines and Technical Surveys (1957–1961)

Paul Comtois PC (August 22, 1895 – February 21, 1966) was a Canadian politician.

Born in Pierreville, Quebec, the son of Urbain Comtois and Elizabeth McCaffrey, he ran unsuccessfully for the House of Commons of Canada in the 1930 federal election and in a 1933 by-election. He was elected in 1957 election for the riding of Nicolet—Yamaska. A Progressive Conservative, he was re-elected in the 1958 election. From 1957 to 1961, he was the Minister of Mines and Technical Surveys. In 1961, he was appointed the 21st Lieutenant Governor of Quebec.

He served until 1966, when he was killed in a fire that destroyed his official residence. While trying to save the Blessed Sacrament from the private chapel, he was overcome by the flames. The only objects he was able to recover were cruets, presumably because he found the tabernacle was locked.
