= Oscar Gladu =

Canadian politician

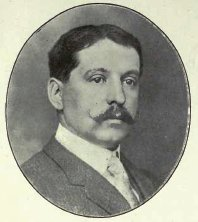

Member of the Canadian Parliament for Yamaska
- In office 1904–1911
- Preceded by: Roch Moïse Samuel Mignault
- Succeeded by: Albéric-Archie Mondou
- In office 1917–1920
- Preceded by: Albéric-Archie Mondou
- Succeeded by: Aimé Boucher

Personal details
- Born: Joseph-Ernest-Oscar Gladu; 25 October 1870 Saint-François-du-Lac, Yamaska County, Quebec, Canada
- Died: 25 December 1920 (aged 50)
- Party: Liberal
- Relations: Victor Gladu, father
- Occupation: notary

Joseph Ernest Oscar Gladu (25 October 1870 – 25 December 1920) was a Canadian politician, who served in the House of Commons of Canada from 1904 to 1911, and from 1917 to 1920.

Born in Saint-François-du-Lac, Yamaska County, Quebec, the son of Victor Gladu and Mary Gill, Gladu was educated at St. Mary's Jesuit College in Montreal, Quebec. A notary by profession, he was first elected to the House of Commons of Canada for the electoral district of Yamaska in the general elections of 1904. A Liberal, he was re-elected in 1908 and was defeated in 1911. He was re-elected in 1917. He died in office in 1920.
