= Jonathan Saxton Campbell Würtele =

Canadian politician

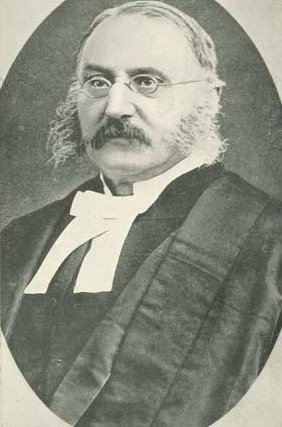

Member of the Legislative Assembly of Quebec for Yamaska
- In office 1875–1886
- Preceded by: Joseph Nestor Duguay
- Succeeded by: Victor Gladu

President of the National Assembly of Quebec
- In office 1884–1886
- Preceded by: Louis-Olivier Taillon
- Succeeded by: Félix-Gabriel Marchand

Personal details
- Born: January 27, 1828 Quebec City, Lower Canada
- Died: April 24, 1904 (aged 76) Montreal, Quebec
- Party: Liberal; Conservative

Jonathan Saxton Campbell Würtele, QC (January 27, 1828 – April 24, 1904) was a Quebec seigneur, lawyer, judge and political figure. He represented Yamaska in the Legislative Assembly of Quebec from 1875 to 1886.

== Biography ==
He was born at Quebec City in 1828, the son of merchant Jonathan Würtele. He attended Quebec High School, studied law privately with Jean Chabot, and was called to the bar in 1850. He practised law at Montreal with Henry Hague Judah. After the death of his father in 1853, he inherited the seigneuries of Deguire (also known as Rivière-David), Bourg-Marie-Est, Saint-François and La Lussaudière. He settled at Saint-David-d'Yamaska, where he served as justice of the peace, chairman of the school board and mayor. He helped found the Société Saint-Jean-Baptiste there and also served as its president. In 1854, he married Julia, the daughter of Wolfred Nelson. He founded the Yamaska Navigation Company in 1858 which transported goods along the Yamaska and Saint-François Rivers. Würtele was chief clerk of the Seigneurial Commission, charged with settling the claims for compensation following the abolition of seigneurial tenure in 1854.

He returned to his law practice in partnership with John Abbott from 1866 to 1868 and then with Frederick Thomas Judah. He also taught commercial law at McGill College. He received the degree of B. C. L. from McGill in 1870, and of D. C. L. in 1882. In 1873, he was named Queen's Counsel. He married Sarah Braniff in 1875, after the death of his first wife.

He was made an officer of public instruction in 1880 and an officer of the Legion of Honour in France in 1882. Würtele negotiated a loan in France for the province of Quebec in 1880, and organized at the same time the Credit foncier Franco Canadien, of which he was a director. He has been counsel of the German Society of Montreal, and has held the offices of chief clerk of the seignioral commission, mayor of St. David, and president of the school commissioners of that place.

Würtele was elected to the legislature of Quebec, reelected in 1878 and in 1881, and again in 1882 on his being appointed provincial treasurer. He served as provincial treasurer from 1882 to 1884 and speaker for the legislative assembly from 1884 to 1886. In 1886, he was named judge in the Quebec Superior Court, first for Ottawa district and, in 1888, for Montreal district. In 1891, he was named associate judge in the Court of Queen's Bench and, in 1892, puisne judge in the same court. He wrote Manual of the Legislative Assembly of Quebec (Quebec, 1885).

He died at Montreal in 1904 and was buried in the Notre Dame des Neiges Cemetery.
