= Bourbeau =

Bourbeau is a French surname. Notable people with the surname include:

- Allen Bourbeau (born 1965), American former ice hockey player
- André Bourbeau (1936–2018), Canadian politician
- Désiré Olivier Bourbeau (1834–1900), politician and merchant
