= Ignace Gill =

Ignace Gill (March 15, 1808 – September 1, 1865) was a businessman and political figure in Canada East.

He was born in Saint-François-du-Lac, Lower Canada in 1808. He worked as a clerk in stores at Baie-du-Febvre and then operated his own store at Saint-François-de-Sales from around 1830 to 1850. He was named justice of the peace in 1835. Gill later became involved in the timber trade and administered the Pierreville seigneury for François-Xavier Biron. He also served as postmaster at Saint-François-du-Lac. In 1854, he was elected to the Legislative Assembly of the Province of Canada for Yamaska and was reelected in 1857. He served as mayor of Saint-Thomas-de-Pierreville in 1862–3.

He died in Saint-Thomas-de-Pierreville in 1865.

His son Charles-Ignace later represented Yamaska in the Canadian House of Commons and the Quebec legislative assembly.
