= Mondou =

Mondou is a surname. Notable people with the surname include:

- Albéric-Archie Mondou (1872–1951), Canadian politician
- Armand Mondou (1905–1976), Canadian ice hockey forward
- Benoît Mondou (born 1985), Canadian ice hockey player
- Nate Mondou (born 1995), American baseball player
- Pierre Mondou (born 1955), Canadian ice hockey forward
