= Félix Allard =

Canadian politician

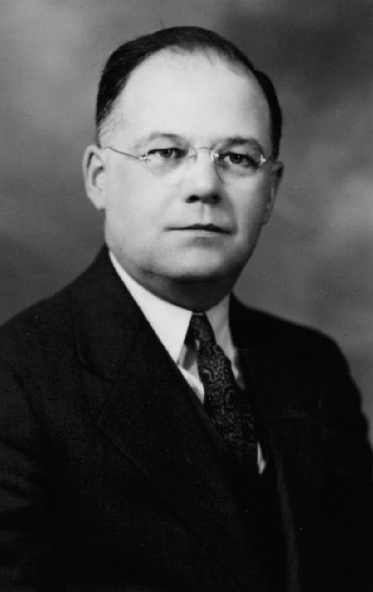

Member of the Legislative Assembly of Quebec for Abitibi
- In office 1939–1944
- Preceded by: Émile Lesage
- Succeeded by: The riding was abolished.

Personal details
- Born: October 25, 1897 Saint-François-du-Lac, Quebec
- Died: September 17, 1974 (aged 76) Sainte-Foy, Quebec
- Party: Liberal

Félix Allard (October 25, 1897 – September 17, 1974) was a lawyer, judge and political figure in Quebec. He represented Abitibi in the Legislative Assembly of Quebec from 1939 to 1944 as a Liberal.

He was born in Saint-François-du-Lac, Quebec, the son of Jules Allard and Berthe Toupin. Allard was educated at the Collège de Nicolet, the Université Laval at Montreal and the School of Management at Poughkeepsie, New York. He was admitted to the Quebec bar in 1922 and set up practice in Montreal, then, from 1924 to 1928, with Hector Authier at Amos and later on his own. From 1929 to 1936, he was deputy crown attorney for Abitibi district. He resigned his seat in the Quebec assembly after he was named judge in the circuit court for Abitibi, Rouyn-Noranda and Témiscamingue districts in 1944; he served until 1967. In 1945, he married Marie-Jeanne-Rita Hébert. Allard died in Sainte-Foy at the age of 76.
