= Louis Lavergne =

Canadian politician

The Hon. Louis Lavergne
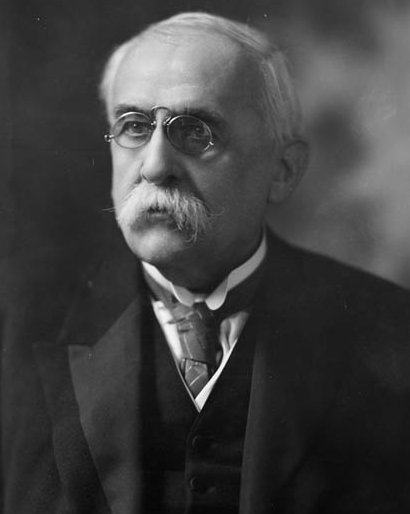

Member of the Canadian Parliament for Drummond—Arthabaska
- In office 1897–1910
- Preceded by: Joseph Lavergne
- Succeeded by: Arthur Gilbert

Senator for Kennebec, Quebec
- In office October 13, 1910 – June 3, 1930
- Preceded by: George Alexander Drummond
- Succeeded by: Georges Parent

Personal details
- Born: December 1, 1845 St. Pierre de Montmagny, Canada East
- Died: February 15, 1931 (aged 85)
- Party: Liberal
- Relations: Joseph Lavergne (brother); Armand Renaud Lavergne (nephew)

Louis Lavergne (December 1, 1845 – February 15, 1931) was a Canadian politician.

Born in St. Pierre de Montmagny, Canada East, Lavergne was educated at the Collège Sainte-Anne-de-la-Pocatière. A notary by profession, Lavergne was first elected to the House of Commons of Canada for the riding of Drummond—Arthabaska in an 1897 by-election, after his brother, Joseph Lavergne, the current MP was appointed Puisne Judge of the Superior Court of the Province of Quebec. A Liberal, Lavergne was acclaimed in the 1900 election and re-elected in 1904 and 1908. In 1910, he was summoned to the Senate of Canada representing the senatorial division of Kennebec, Quebec on the advice of Wilfrid Laurier. He served until resigning on June 3, 1930.

His nephew, Armand Renaud Lavergne, was also an MP.

His daughter Marie Louise Lavergne, married future Supreme Court of Canada justice Albert Malouin.
