= Jules Allard =

Canadian politician

Jules Allard KC
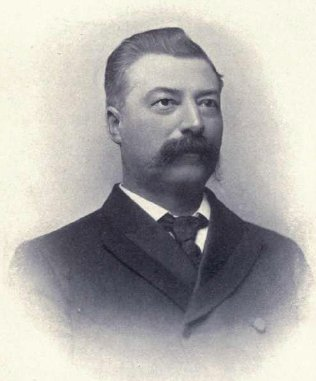

Member of the Legislative Assembly of Quebec for Yamaska
- In office 1897–1905
- Preceded by: Victor Gladu
- Succeeded by: Guillaume-Édouard Ouellette

Member of the Legislative Council of Quebec for de Lanaudière
- In office 1905–1910
- Preceded by: Louis Sylvestre
- Succeeded by: Louis-Philippe Bérard
- In office 1916–1919
- Preceded by: Louis-Philippe Bérard
- Succeeded by: Clément Robillard

Member of the Legislative Assembly of Quebec for Drummond
- In office 1910–1916
- Preceded by: Joseph Laferté
- Succeeded by: Hector Laferté

Personal details
- Born: January 21, 1859 Saint-François-du-Lac, Canada East
- Died: January 3, 1945 (aged 85) Montreal, Quebec, Canada
- Party: Liberal
- Relations: Aimé Boucher, son-in-law
- Children: Félix Allard
- Education: Nicolet College; Université Laval

Louis-Jules Allard KC (21 January 1859 – 3 January 1945) was a Canadian politician in the province of Quebec.

== Life ==
Born in Saint-François-du-Lac, Canada East, the son of Louis Allard and Marie-Anne Chapdelaine, Allard was educated at Nicolet College and the Université Laval in Montreal. A lawyer, he was called to the Quebec Bar in 1883 and was created a King's Counsel in 1906. He practice law in Montreal. He was mayor of Saint-François-du-Lac from 1895 to 1898.

He was elected to the Legislative Assembly of Quebec for the electoral district of Yamaska in an 1897 by-election held after the death of Victor Gladu. A Liberal, he was re-elected without opposition in 1900 and 1904. In 1905, he was appointed to the Legislative Council of Quebec for the de Lanaudière division and was named the Government Leader in the council. He held three cabinet positions: Minister of Colonization and Public Works (1905), Minister of Public Works and Labour (1905–1906), and Minister of Agriculture (1906–1909). He resigned in 1910 and was re-elected in a 1910 by-election in the riding of Drummond to the Legislative Assembly. He was re-elected in 1912. He was again appointed to the Legislative Council in 1916. From 1909 to 1919, he was the Minister of Lands and Forests. He also served as interim premier and President of the Executive Council when Premier Lomer Gouin was absent. He resigned in 1916. In 1919, he was appointed Protonotaire for the Superior Court district of Montreal. He held this position until his death in 1945.

His son, Félix Allard, was a Quebec politician. His daughter Marguerite married Aimé Boucher, a member of the House of Commons of Canada.
