= Michel Fourquin =

Member of the Legislative Assembly of the Province of Canada for Yamaska
- In office 1848–1851

Personal details
- Born: September 30, 1791 Yamaska, Lower Canada, British Empire (now in Quebec)
- Died: October 27, 1861 (aged 70) Lavallière Bay, Province of Canada (now in Quebec)
- Party: Independent
- Spouses: Catherine Parenteau (m. 1815) Suzanne Chouinard (m. 1825) Geneviève Leclerc (m. 1859)
- Occupation: farmer, politician

Michel Fourquin (September 30, 1791 – October 27, 1861) was a farmer and political figure in Canada East. He represented Yamaska in the Legislative Assembly of the Province of Canada from 1848 to 1851. His surname also appears as Fourquin dit Léveillé.

He was born in Yamaska, Lower Canada, the son of Joseph Léveillé and Marguerite Lasalle. Fourquin owned a farm at Yamaska. He was married three times: first to Catherine Parenteau in 1815, then to Suzanne Chouinard in 1825 and finally to Geneviève Leclerc in 1859. He was an unsuccessful candidate for a seat in the assembly in 1844 and was defeated when he ran for reelection in 1851. Fourquin drowned in Lavallière Bay at the age of 70.
