= Albéric-Archie Mondou =

Canadian politician (1872–1951)

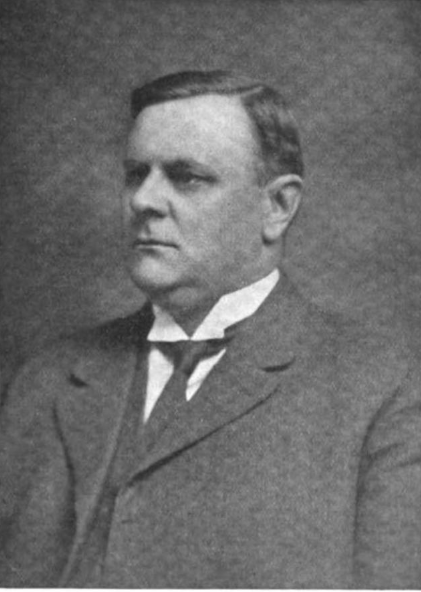

Member of the Canadian Parliament for Yamaska
- In office 1911–1917
- Preceded by: Roch Moïse Samuel Mignault
- Succeeded by: Oscar Gladu

Member of the Legislative Assembly of Quebec for Yamaska
- In office May 11, 1897 – September 23, 1897
- Preceded by: Victor Gladu
- Succeeded by: Victor Gladu

Personal details
- Born: February 2, 1872 Saint-François-du-Lac, Quebec, Canada
- Died: February 13, 1951 (aged 79) Montreal, Quebec, Canada
- Party: Conservative
- Other political affiliations: Conservative Party of Quebec

Albéric-Archie Mondou (February 2, 1872 – February 13, 1951) was a notary and political figure in Quebec. He represented Yamaska in the Legislative Assembly of Quebec in 1897 and Yamaska in the House of Commons of Canada from 1911 to 1917 as a Conservative.

He was born in Saint-François-du-Lac, Quebec, the son of Eusèbe Mondou and Marie-Georgina Desmarais, and was educated at the Séminaire de Nicolet and the Université Laval. He qualified to practise as a notary in 1894 and set up practice in Montreal. In 1895, he married Augustine Cardin. Mondou was a director of the Strathcona Fire Insurance Company and vice-president and manager of the Quebec and Western Canada Land Syndicate Ltd. He was manager of the Banque Provinciale at Pierreville from 1902 to 1911. Mondou defeated Victor Gladu in 1897 for a seat in the Quebec assembly; that election was overturned and he lost two subsequent by-elections held later that year. He ran unsuccessfully for a federal seat in 1900, in 1921 and 1945. Mondou died in Montreal at the age of 79.
