= Maurice Boisvert =

Canadian politician

Member of the Canadian Parliament for Nicolet—Yamaska
- In office June 1949 – June 1957
- Preceded by: Renaud Chapdelaine
- Succeeded by: Paul Comtois

Personal details
- Born: 18 February 1897 Pierreville, Quebec, Canada
- Died: 23 February 1988 (aged 91) Ottawa, Ontario, Canada
- Party: Liberal
- Spouse(s): Pauline LaBel (m. 21 April 1924)
- Occupation: lawyer

Maurice Boisvert (18 February 1897 – 23 February 1988) was a Canadian politician and lawyer. He was elected to the House of Commons of Canada as a Member of the Liberal Party in the 1949 election to represent the riding of Nicolet—Yamaska defeating Progressive Conservative MP Renaud Chapdelaine who had won an upset by-election victory earlier that year. Boisvert was re-elected in 1953.

He was born in 1897, the son of Adelard and Laura (née Cartier) Boisvert. He attended Nicolet College and Laval University, receiving his B.A. cum laude in 1918 from the latter.

Boisvert died on 23 February 1988 at Ottawa, aged 91.

== Archives ==
There is a Maurice Boisvert fonds at Library and Archives Canada. Archival reference number is R7644.
