= David Laperrière =

Canadian politician

Member of the Legislative Assembly of Quebec for Yamaska
- In office 1923–1931
- Preceded by: Édouard Ouellette
- Succeeded by: Antonio Élie

Personal details
- Born: May 7, 1868 Pierreville, Quebec
- Died: May 18, 1932 (aged 64) Pierreville, Quebec
- Party: Liberal

David Laperrière (French pronunciation: [david lapɛʁjɛʁ]; May 7, 1868 – May 18, 1932) was a Canadian provincial politician. He was the Liberal member of the Legislative Assembly of Quebec for Yamaska from 1923 to 1931. He was also mayor of Pierreville from 1914 to 1931.
