= Joseph Nestor Duguay =

Canadian politician

Member of the Legislative Assembly of Quebec for Yamaska
- In office 1874–1875
- Preceded by: Charles-Ignace Gill
- Succeeded by: Jonathan Saxton Campbell Würtele

Personal details
- Born: March 15, 1846 Baie-du-Febvre, Canada East
- Died: March 17, 1907 (aged 61) Baie-du-Febvre, Quebec
- Party: Conservative
- Relations: Joseph Duguay, father

Joseph-Nestor Duguay (March 15, 1846 – March 17, 1907) was a businessman and political figure in Quebec. He represented Yamaska in the Legislative Assembly of Quebec from 1874 to 1875 as a Conservative.

He was born in Baie-du-Febvre, Canada East, the son of Joseph Duguay and Anne-Scholastique-Olive Beauchemin, and was educated at the Collège de Nicolet. Duguay was one of the pioneers of the dairy industry in the Yamaska region and owned a number of cheese-making facilities. He was married three times: to Marie-Éméline Davis in 1866, then to Marie-Nina Davis, his first wife's sister, in 1877 and finally to Émiline Lacerte in 1905. Duguay was mayor of Saint-Zéphirin-de-Courval from 1875 to 1876. He ran unsuccessfully for reelection to the Quebec assembly in 1890. Duguay died at Baie-du-Febvre at the age of 61.
