= Samuel Boulanger =

Canadian politician

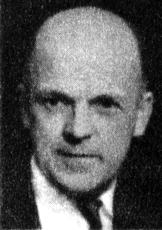

Member of the Canadian Parliament for Drummond—Arthabaska
- In office 1957–1962
- Preceded by: Armand Cloutier
- Succeeded by: David Ouellet

Personal details
- Born: May 8, 1909 Saint-Isidore, Quebec, Canada
- Died: July 13, 1989 (aged 80)
- Party: Liberal Party (1958-1965); Independent Liberal (1957-1958); Independent (1965-)
- Occupation: agrologist manager manufacturer teacher

Samuel Boulanger (May 8, 1909 – July 13, 1989) was a Canadian politician, agrologist, manager, manufacturer and teacher. He was elected to the House of Commons of Canada in 1957 as an Independent Liberal to represent the riding of Drummond—Arthabaska. He joined the Liberal Party and was elected in 1958. He was defeated in the elections of 1962 and in 1965, the last as an independent.

1957 Canadian federal election: Drummond—Arthabaska
Party	Candidate	Votes
Independent Liberal	Samuel Boulanger	11,462
Liberal	Armand Cloutier	10,512
Progressive Conservative	Victor Paul	10,327

1958 Canadian federal election: Drummond—Arthabaska
Party	Candidate	Votes
Liberal	Samuel Boulanger	17,288
Progressive Conservative	Victor Paul	16,522
Social Credit	Sylvio Mélancon	1,308

1962 Canadian federal election: Drummond—Arthabaska
Party	Candidate	Votes
Social Credit	David Ouellet	17,597
Liberal	Samuel Boulanger	13,414
Progressive Conservative	Victor Paul	7,050
