= Victor Gladu =

Canadian politician

Member of the Legislative Assembly of Quebec for Yamaska
- In office 1886–1897
- Preceded by: Jonathan Saxton Campbell Würtele
- Succeeded by: Albéric-Archie Mondou
- In office November 16, 1897 – December 1, 1897
- Preceded by: Albéric-Archie Mondou
- Succeeded by: Jules Allard

Personal details
- Born: April 16, 1844 Saint-Antoine-sur-Richelieu, Canada East
- Died: December 1, 1897 (aged 53) Saint-François-du-Lac, Quebec
- Party: Liberal
- Children: Oscar Gladu

Victor Gladu (April 16, 1844 – December 1, 1897) was a notary and political figure in Quebec. He represented Yamaska in the Legislative Assembly of Quebec from 1886 to 1897 as a Liberal.

He was born in Saint-Antoine-sur-Richelieu, Canada East, the son of notary Victor Gladu and Adée Perrin, and was educated at the Jesuit College in Montreal, Quebec. Pilon articled as a notary with Félix Geoffrion, qualified to practise in 1886 and set up practice in Saint-François-du-Lac. In 1868, he married Marie Gill. He was a real estate agent for John Joseph Caldwell Abbott. Gladu was secretary-treasurer for the Agricultural Society for Yamaska County. He also served as mayor of Saint-François-du-Lac and warden for the county. Gladu ran unsuccessfully for a seat in the Quebec assembly in 1881 and for a seat in the House of Commons in 1882. He was defeated in the general election in 1897, losing to Albéric-Archie Mondou, then won the by-election held later that year. Pilon died in office at Saint-François-du-Lac at the age of 53.

His son Oscar served in the Canadian House of Commons.
