= Joseph Ovide Brouillard =

Canadian politician (1859–1940)

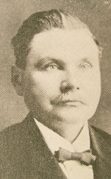

Member of the Canadian Parliament for Drummond—Arthabaska
- In office 1911–1921
- Preceded by: Arthur Gilbert
- Succeeded by: Napoléon Kemner Laflamme

Personal details
- Born: January 17, 1859 St. Aimé, Canada East
- Died: March 3, 1940 (aged 81)
- Party: Liberal
- Occupation: businessman

Joseph Ovide Brouillard (January 17, 1859 – March 3, 1940) was a Canadian politician and businessman. He was elected to the House of Commons of Canada as a Member of the Liberal Party in the 1911 election to represent the riding of Drummond—Arthabaska. He was re-elected in the 1917 election and joined the Laurier Liberals March 18, 1918.

1911 Canadian federal election: Drummond—Arthabaska
Party	Candidate	Votes
Liberal	Joseph Ovide Brouillard	3,800
Nationalist	Arthur Gilbert	3,533

1917 Canadian federal election: Drummond—Arthabaska
Party	Candidate	Votes
Opposition (Laurier Liberals)	Joseph Ovide Brouillard	acclaimed
