= Wilfrid Girouard =

Canadian politician and judge (1891–1980)

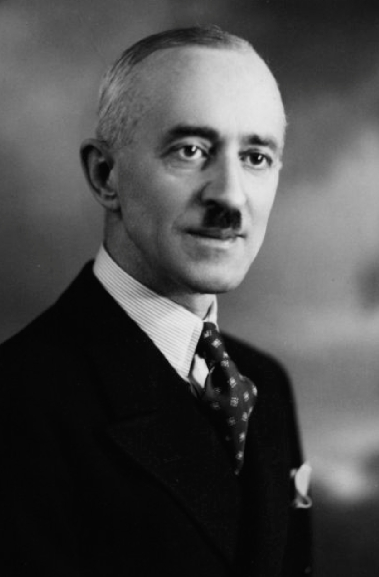

Member of the Canadian Parliament for Drummond—Arthabaska
- In office 1925–1939
- Preceded by: Napoléon Kemner Laflamme
- Succeeded by: Armand Cloutier

Member of the Legislative Assembly of Quebec for Arthabaska
- In office 1939–1942
- Preceded by: Joseph-David Gagné
- Succeeded by: Pierre-Horace Plourde

Personal details
- Born: September 9, 1891 Drummondville, Quebec
- Died: October 26, 1980 (aged 89) Quebec City, Quebec
- Party: Liberal Party of Canada
- Other political affiliations: Quebec Liberal Party
- Relations: Joseph-Éna Girouard, father
- Cabinet: Attorney General (1939-1942)

Wilfrid Girouard (September 9, 1891 – October 26, 1980) was a lawyer, judge and political figure in Quebec. He represented Drummond—Arthabaska in the House of Commons of Canada from 1926 to 1939 as a Liberal member and represented Arthabaska in the Legislative Assembly of Quebec from 1939 to 1942.

He was born in Drummondville, Quebec, the son of Joseph-Éna Girouard and Emma Watkins, and was educated at the Collège d'Arthabaska, the Collège Sainte-Marie, Loyola College and McGill University. Girouard was admitted to the Quebec bar in 1916 and set up practice at Arthabaska with Joseph-Édouard Perrault. In 1926, he was named King's Counsel. Girouard was bâtonnier for Quebec in 1940 and 1941. He was married twice: to Thérèse Marsil in 1923 and to Marie-Louise-Florence Côté in 1949.

He resigned his seat in the House of Commons in 1939 and was elected to the Quebec assembly that year. Girouard served in the Quebec cabinet as Attorney General from 1939 to 1942. In 1942, he was named judge in the Quebec Superior Court for Trois-Rivières district and served in that post until 1963. He died at Quebec City at the age of 89 and was buried at Arthabaska.

1925 Canadian federal election: Drummond—Arthabaska
Party	Candidate	Votes
Liberal	Wilfrid Girouard	9,301
Conservative	Joseph Marier	3,926
Farmer	Luc Louis Philippe Poulin de Courval	1,130

1926 Canadian federal election: Drummond—Arthabaska
Party	Candidate	Votes
Liberal	Wilfrid Girouard	9,600
Conservative	Henri-Édouard St-Sauveur	3,814

1930 Canadian federal election: Drummond—Arthabaska
Party	Candidate	Votes
Liberal	Wilfrid Girouard	11,241
Conservative	Agésilas Kirouac	7,784
Source: lop.parl.ca

1935 Canadian federal election: Drummond—Arthabaska
Party	Candidate	Votes
Liberal	Wilfrid Girouard	14,125
Conservative	Roland Provencher	7,411
Reconstruction	Élie Lalumière	1,067
