= Édouard Ouellette =

Canadian politician

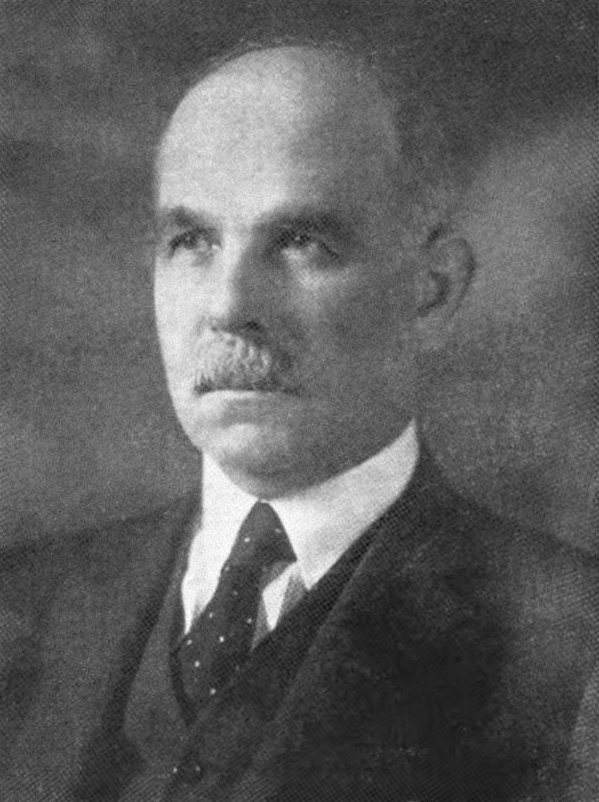

Member of the Legislative Assembly of Quebec for Yamaska
- In office 1905–1923
- Preceded by: Jules Allard
- Succeeded by: David Laperrière

Member of the Legislative Council of Quebec for Rigaud
- In office 1923–1931
- Preceded by: Séverin Létourneau
- Succeeded by: Victor Marchand

Personal details
- Born: November 6, 1860 United States
- Died: February 2, 1931 (aged 70) Outremont, Quebec, Canada
- Resting place: Notre Dame des Neiges Cemetery
- Party: Liberal

Édouard Ouellette (French pronunciation: [edwaʁ wɛlɛt]; November 6, 1860 – February 2, 1931) was a Canadian provincial politician. He was a member of the Legislative Assembly of Quebec for Yamaska from 1905 to 1923 and a member of the Legislative Council of Quebec from 1923 until his death in 1931.
