= Napoléon Kemner Laflamme =

Canadian politician (1865–1929)

The Hon. Napoléon Kemner Laflamme
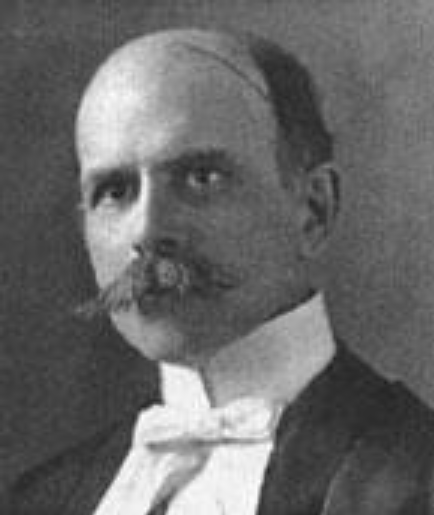
- Laflamme in 1923

Member of the Canadian Parliament for Drummond—Arthabaska
- In office December 1921 – September 1925
- Preceded by: Joseph Ovide Brouillard
- Succeeded by: Wilfrid Girouard

Senator for Mille Isles, Quebec
- In office 21 December 1927 – 10 August 1929
- Appointed by: William Lyon Mackenzie King
- Preceded by: Laurent-Olivier David
- Succeeded by: Jules-Édouard Prévost

Personal details
- Born: Napoléon Kemner Laflamme; 22 October 1865 Lyster, Canada East
- Died: 10 August 1929 (aged 63) St-Mathias de Richelieu, Quebec
- Party: Liberal
- Spouse: Eugénie Surveyer
- Profession: lawyer

Napoléon Kemner Laflamme, KC (22 October 1865 – 10 August 1929) was a Liberal party member of the House of Commons of Canada. He was born in Lyster, Canada East, the son of Jacques K. Laflamme and Marie Gagné, and became a lawyer.

Laflamme was educated at the Séminaire de Québec and the Université Laval, was called to the Quebec bar in 1893 and set up practice in Montreal. In 1905, he was named King's Counsel. Laflamme was an unsuccessful candidate for a seat in the Quebec assembly in 1909. In the same year, he married Eugénie Surveyor. He was elected to Parliament at the Drummond—Arthabaska riding in the 1921 general election. After serving one term in the House of Commons, he left federal politics as of the 1925 federal election and did not seek re-election.

Laflamme was appointed to the Senate on 21 December 1927 and remained in that role until his death on 10 August 1929.

1921 Canadian federal election: Drummond—Arthabaska
Party	Candidate	Votes
Liberal	Napoléon Kemner Laflamme	10,280
Progressive	Wilfrid Blanchard	2,154
Conservative	Wilfrid Laliberté	1,902
Independent	Joseph Albert Nadeau	1,503
