= Antonio Élie =

Canadian politician (1893–1968)

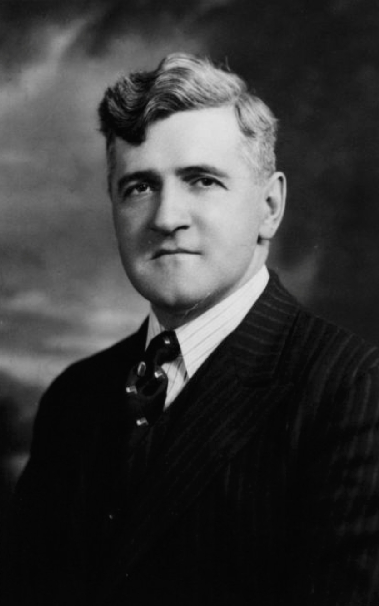

Member of the Legislative Assembly of Quebec for Yamaska
- In office 1931–1966
- Preceded by: David Laperrière
- Succeeded by: Paul Shooner

Personal details
- Born: December 9, 1893 Baie-du-Febvre, Quebec
- Died: January 15, 1968 (aged 74) Baie-du-Febvre, Quebec

Antonio Élie (December 9, 1893 – January 15, 1968) was a Canadian politician and a ten-term Member of the Legislative Assembly of Quebec.

== Background ==
He was born in Baie-du-Febvre, Quebec and was a farmer. He served as a city councillor in Baie-du-Febvre, Quebec in 1923 and 1924.

== Member of the legislature ==
Élie ran as a Conservative candidate in 1931 and won, becoming the Member for the district of Yamaska.

He was re-elected in 1935, as a Union Nationale candidate in 1936, 1939, 1944, 1948, 1952, 1956, 1960 and 1962.

== Minister without Portfolio ==
Élie was appointed Minister in the Cabinet of Maurice Duplessis, serving as Minister without Portfolio from 1936 to 1939 and from 1944 to 1958. He did not run for re-election in 1966.

== Death ==
He died on January 15, 1968.
