= Joseph Lavergne =

Canadian politician and judge (1847–1922)

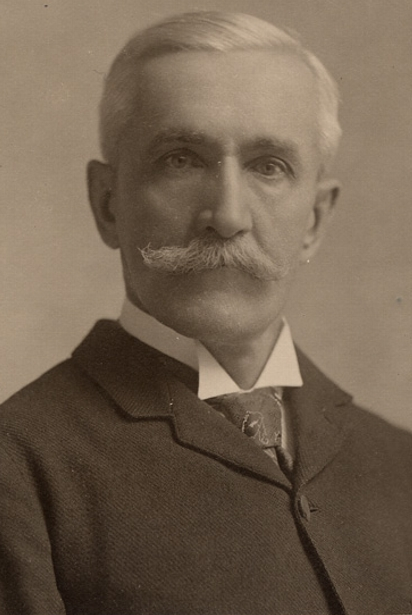

Member of the Canadian Parliament for Drummond—Arthabaska
- In office 1887–1897
- Preceded by: Désiré Olivier Bourbeau
- Succeeded by: Louis Lavergne

Personal details
- Born: October 29, 1847 Saint-Pierre-de-la-Rivière-du-Sud, Montmagny County, Canada East
- Died: January 9, 1922 (aged 74)
- Party: Liberal
- Spouse: Émilie Barthe
- Relations: Louis Lavergne (brother)
- Children: Armand Lavergne

Joseph Lavergne (October 29, 1847 – January 9, 1922) was a lawyer, judge, editor and political figure in Quebec. He represented Drummond—Arthabaska in the House of Commons of Canada from 1887 to 1897 as a Liberal member.

He was born in Saint-Pierre-de-la-Rivière-du-Sud, Montmagny County, Canada East, the son of David Lavergne and Marie-Geneviève Delagrave, was educated at Sainte-Anne-de-la-Pocatière and studied law with his uncle Joseph Delagrave. He was called to the Quebec bar in 1869, set up practice in Princeville and then Arthabaska, where he practised law in partnership with Wilfrid Laurier. In 1876, Lavergne married Émilie Barthe, the daughter of Joseph-Guillaume Barthe. He served as mayor for Arthabaskaville and warden for Arthabaska County. Lavergne was editor for L'Union des Cantons de l'Est. He was also bâtonnier for the Arthabaska section of the Quebec Bar.

Lavergne resigned his seat in 1897 after he was named puisne judge for the Quebec Superior Court for Ottawa district. His brother Louis succeeded him as representative for Drummond—Arthabaska in the House of Commons. In 1901, he was transferred to Montreal district. Lavergne was named to the Court of King's Bench in 1906. He died in Montreal at the age of 74.

His son Armand Renaud also served as a member of the House of Commons.

== Electoral record ==
1887 Canadian federal election: Drummond—Arthabaska
Party	Candidate	Votes
Liberal	Joseph Lavergne	acclaimed

1891 Canadian federal election: Drummond—Arthabaska
Party	Candidate	Votes
Liberal	Joseph Lavergne	3,159
Conservative	L.P.E. Crépeau	2,197

1896 Canadian federal election: Drummond—Arthabaska
Party	Candidate	Votes
Liberal	Joseph Lavergne	3,561
Conservative	E. Désy	2,255

By-election on 13 November 1897 Lavergne nominated as Puisne Judge of the Superior Court of the Province of Quebec, 4 August 1897
Party	Candidate	Votes
Liberal	Louis Lavergne	3,022
Conservative	Auguste Noel	1,374

1900 Canadian federal election: Drummond—Arthabaska
Party	Candidate	Votes
Liberal	Louis Lavergne	acclaimed

1904 Canadian federal election: Drummond—Arthabaska
Party	Candidate	Votes
Liberal	Louis Lavergne	3,753
Conservative	Stanislas Montplaisir	1,277

1908 Canadian federal election: Drummond—Arthabaska
Party	Candidate	Votes
Liberal	Louis Lavergne	3,754
Independent Liberal	Luc Louis Philippe Poulin de Courval	2,920
