= David Ouellet (politician) =

Canadian politician

Member of Parliament for Drummond—Arthabaska
- In office September 1962 – April 1963
- Preceded by: Samuel Boulanger
- Succeeded by: Jean-Luc Pépin

Personal details
- Born: 9 January 1908 Saint-Ulric, Quebec
- Died: 14 September 1972 (aged 64) Drummondville, Quebec
- Party: Social Credit
- Profession: insurance broker

David Ouellet (9 January 1908 – 14 September 1972) was a Social Credit party member of the House of Commons of Canada. Born at Saint-Ulric, Quebec, he was an insurance broker by career.

He was first elected at the Drummond—Arthabaska riding in the 1962 general election. After serving his only federal term, the 25th Canadian Parliament, Ouellet was defeated in the 1963 federal election by Jean-Luc Pépin of the Liberal party.

1962 Canadian federal election: Drummond—Arthabaska
Party	Candidate	Votes
Social Credit	David Ouellet	17,597
Liberal	Samuel Boulanger	13,414
Progressive Conservative	Victor Paul	7,050

1963 Canadian federal election: Drummond—Arthabaska
Party	Candidate	Votes
Liberal	Jean-Luc Pépin	17,338
Social Credit	David Ouellet	14,739
Progressive Conservative	J.-Claude Couture	3,416
New Democratic	Pierre Lambert	1,456
