= Joseph Provencher =

Canadian politician

Joseph Alfred Norbert Provencher (1843–1887) was a Canadian pioneer, politician and newspaper editor. He served as a member of the Council of Keewatin from 1876 to 1877 and as Indian Agent for the Government of the Northwest Territories.

== Political career ==
Provencher ran for a seat in the House of Commons of Canada in the first 1867 Canadian federal election. In a close race for the electoral district of Yamaska he was defeated by Moïse Fortier.

Provencher was appointed to the Council of Keewatin on November 25, 1876, serving as one of six appointed members. He served on the council until he was asked to resign along with the rest of the council April 16, 1877
