= Armand Cloutier =

Canadian politician

Member of Parliament for Drummond—Arthabaska
- In office March 1940 – June 1957
- Preceded by: Wilfrid Girouard
- Succeeded by: Samuel Boulanger

Personal details
- Born: 31 December 1901 Manchester, New Hampshire, United States
- Died: 14 February 1982 (aged 80) Montreal, Quebec, Canada
- Party: Liberal
- Spouse(s): Jeannette Galarneau (m. 22 July 1933)
- Profession: accountant, paymaster

Armand Cloutier (31 December 1901 – 14 February 1982) was a Liberal party member of the House of Commons of Canada. Born in Manchester, New Hampshire, United States, he was also an accountant and paymaster.

Cloutier was educated at the Commercial College in Victoriaville, then studied accounting at La Salle University in Chicago and also at the Alexander Hamilton Institute in New York.

He was first elected to Parliament at the Drummond—Arthabaska riding in the 1940 general election then re-elected for successive terms in 1945, 1949 and 1953. His first speech in the House of Commons was in February 1942, supporting Allied nations in the World War II effort but objected to proposals for military conscription to support overseas battles. Cloutier was defeated by Samuel Boulanger, an independent liberal candidate, in the 1957 election.

1940 Canadian federal election: Drummond—Arthabaska
Party	Candidate	Votes
Liberal	Armand Cloutier	12,145
Independent Liberal	Joseph Garon	10,853

1945 Canadian federal election: Drummond—Arthabaska
Party	Candidate	Votes
Liberal	Armand Cloutier	14,805
Independent	Joseph Garon	8,547
Bloc populaire	Raymond Beaudet	5,423
Social Credit	Joseph-Richard Aubry	1,037

1949 Canadian federal election: Drummond—Arthabaska
Party	Candidate	Votes
Liberal	Armand Cloutier	16,899
Union des électeurs	Antonio Lamaire	4,251
Progressive Conservative	Jos.-Edmond Demers	1,804

1953 Canadian federal election: Drummond—Arthabaska
Party	Candidate	Votes
Liberal	Armand Cloutier	15,870
Progressive Conservative	Roland Provencher	13,325

1957 Canadian federal election: Drummond—Arthabaska
Party	Candidate	Votes
Independent Liberal	Samuel Boulanger	11,462
Liberal	Armand Cloutier	10,512
Progressive Conservative	Victor Paul	10,327
