= Nicolet—Yamaska =

Former federal electoral district in Quebec, Canada

Quebec electoral district

Defunct federal electoral district
- Legislature: House of Commons
- District created: 1933
- District abolished: 1967
- First contested: 1935
- Last contested: 1965

Nicolet—Yamaska (French pronunciation: [nikɔlɛ(t) jamaska]) was a federal electoral district in Quebec, Canada, that was represented in the House of Commons of Canada from 1935 to 1968.

== History ==
This riding was created in 1933 from Nicolet and Yamaska ridings.

It was defined initially to consist of:

- the county of Nicolet except such part thereof as is included in the municipalities of Lemieux Ste-Cécile-de-Lévrard, St-Joseph-de-Blandford, Ste-Marie-de-Blandford, St-Pierre-les-Becquets, Ste-Sophie-de-Lévrard and the village of Manseau;
- the county of Yamaska except that part of the parish and the village of St-Michel lying west of the river Yamaska.

In 1947, it was redefined to consist of:

- the county of Nicolet, (except the municipalities of Lemieux, Ste. Cécile-de-Lévrard, St. Joseph-de-Blandford, Ste. Marie-de-Blandford, St. Pierre-les-Becquets, Ste. Sophie-de-Lévrard and the villages of Manseau and les Becquets), and the town of Nicolet;
- the county of Yamaska;
- that part of the county of Drummond included in the municipalities of St. Edmond-de-Grantham and St. Majorique-de-Grantham;
- that part of the county of Arthabaska included in the municipalities of Ste. Anne-du-Sault and Maddington and the village of Daveluyville;
- that part of the county of Richelieu included in the municipality of St. Marcel.

In 1952, it was redefined to consist of:

- the county of Nicolet (except the municipality of Lemieux, the parish municipalities of Sainte-Cécile-de-Lévrard, Saint-Joseph-de-Blandford, Sainte-Marie-de-Blandford, Saint-Pierre-les-Becquets, Sainte-Sophie-de-Lévrard, and the village municipalities of Manseau and Les-Becquets), and the town of Nicolet;
- the county of Yamaska;
- that part of the county of Drummond included in the parish municipalities of Saint-Edmond-de-Grantham and Saint-Majorique-de-Grantham;
- that part of the county of Arthabaska included in the parish municipality of Sainte-Anne-du-Sault, the township municipality of Maddington and the village municipality of Daveluyville;
- that part of the county of Richelieu included in the parish municipality of Saint-Marcel.

It was abolished in 1966 when it was redistributed into Lotbinière, Drummond and Richelieu ridings.

== Members of Parliament ==
This riding elected the following members of Parliament:

Parliament	Years	Member	Party
Nicolet—Yamaska; Riding created from Nicolet and Yamaska
18th	1935–1940	Lucien Dubois	Liberal
19th	1940–1945	Lucien Dubois	Liberal
20th	1945–1948	Lucien Dubois	Independent Liberal
20th	1949–1949	Renaud Chapdelaine	Progressive Conservative
21st	1949–1953	Maurice Boisvert	Liberal
22nd	1953–1957	Maurice Boisvert	Liberal
23rd	1957–1958	Paul Comtois	Progressive Conservative
24th	1958–1962	Paul Comtois	Progressive Conservative
25th	1962–1963	Clément Vincent	Progressive Conservative
26th	1963–1965	Clément Vincent	Progressive Conservative
27th	1965–1966	Clément Vincent	Progressive Conservative
27th	1966–1968	Florian Côté	Liberal
Riding dissolved into Lotbinière, Drummond and Richelieu

== Election results ==
1935 Canadian federal election
Party	Candidate	Votes
Liberal	Lucien Dubois	9,542
Conservative	Aimé Chassé	6,770
Reconstruction	Joseph-Léon-Kemner Laflamme	108

1940 Canadian federal election
Party	Candidate	Votes
Liberal	Lucien Dubois	7,445
Liberal	François-Moras Manseau	6,865
National Government	Joseph-Henri Belcourt	410
Independent Conservative	Léo Coté	232

1945 Canadian federal election
Party	Candidate	Votes
Independent Liberal	Lucien Dubois	7,973
Liberal	Paul-Arthur Trahan	6,658
Progressive Conservative	Joseph-Archie-Albéric Mondou	944

By-election on 7 February 1949 Dubois died, 8 November 1948
Party	Candidate	Votes
Progressive Conservative	Renaud Chapdelaine	8,382
Liberal	Paul-A. Trahan	8,095
Independent Liberal	Romulus Manseau	469

1949 Canadian federal election
Party	Candidate	Votes
Liberal	Maurice Boisvert	10,208
Progressive Conservative	Renaud Chapdelaine	9,860

1953 Canadian federal election
Party	Candidate	Votes
Liberal	Maurice Boisvert	9,483
Independent Liberal	Roger Cloutier	7,397
Progressive Conservative	Armand Proulx	2,396

1957 Canadian federal election
Party	Candidate	Votes
Progressive Conservative	Paul Comtois	9,805
Liberal	René Blondin	9,292

1958 Canadian federal election
Party	Candidate	Votes
Progressive Conservative	Paul Comtois	11,880
Liberal	Gilles Pellerin	7,219

1962 Canadian federal election
Party	Candidate	Votes
Progressive Conservative	Clément Vincent	8,861
Liberal	Lorenzo Saint-Arnaud	7,427
Social Credit	Denis Cournoyer	3,233

1963 Canadian federal election
Party	Candidate	Votes
Progressive Conservative	Clément Vincent	9,438
Liberal	Lorenzo Saint-Arnaud	8,124
Social Credit	Gérard Lupien	1,825
New Democratic	Claude Rondeau	228

1965 Canadian federal election
Party	Candidate	Votes
Progressive Conservative	Clément Vincent	11,734
Liberal	Jean Arsenault	6,090
Ralliement créditiste	Roméo Marsan	368
New Democratic	Rodolphe Guillemette	210

By-election on 19 September 1966 Clément Vincent resigned, 4 May 1966
Party	Candidate	Votes
Liberal	Florian Côté	7,936
Conservative	Normand Beaudoin	6,842
Independent	Jean Marc Denoncourt	1,129
New Democratic	Georges-Henri Forcier	588
Droit vital personnel	H.-Georges Grenier	44

== See also ==
- List of Canadian electoral districts
- Historical federal electoral districts of Canada
