= Yamaska (federal electoral district) =

Former federal electoral district in Quebec, Canada

Quebec electoral district

Defunct federal electoral district
- Legislature: House of Commons
- District created: 1867
- District abolished: 1933
- First contested: 1867
- Last contested: 1933 by-election

Yamaska (French pronunciation: [jamaska]) was a federal electoral district in Quebec, Canada that was represented in the House of Commons of Canada from 1867 to 1935.

It was created by the British North America Act, 1867, which preserved existing electoral districts in Lower Canada.

In 1924, it was defined as consisting of the County of Yamaska, and the township of Upton in the County of Drummond.

The electoral district was abolished in 1933, when it was re-distributed into Nicolet—Yamaska, Drummond—Arthabaska and Richelieu—Verchères ridings.

== Members of Parliament ==
This riding elected the following members of Parliament:

Parliament	Years	Member	Party
Yamaska
1st	1867–1872	Moïse Fortier	Liberal
2nd	1872–1874	Joseph Duguay	Conservative
3rd	1874–1878	Charles-Ignace Gill	Conservative
4th	1878–1879	Charles-Ignace Gill	Conservative
4th	1879–1882	Fabien Vanasse dit Vertefeuille	Conservative
5th	1882–1887	Fabien Vanasse dit Vertefeuille	Conservative
6th	1887–1891	Fabien Vanasse dit Vertefeuille	Conservative
7th	1891–1896	Roch Moïse Samuel Mignault	Liberal
8th	1896–1900	Roch Moïse Samuel Mignault	Liberal
9th	1900–1904	Roch Moïse Samuel Mignault	Liberal
10th	1904–1908	Oscar Gladu	Liberal
11th	1908–1911	Oscar Gladu	Liberal
12th	1911–1917	Albéric-Archie Mondou	Conservative
13th	1917–1920	Oscar Gladu	Opposition (Laurier Liberals)
13th	1921–1921	Aimé Boucher	Liberal
14th	1921–1925	Aimé Boucher	Liberal
15th	1925–1926	Aimé Boucher	Liberal
16th	1926–1930	Aimé Boucher	Liberal
17th	1930–1932	Aimé Boucher	Liberal
17th	1933–1935	Aimé Boucher	Liberal
Riding dissolved into Nicolet—Yamaska, Drummond—Arthabaska and Richelieu—Verchères

== Election results ==
1867 Canadian federal election
Party	Candidate	Votes
Liberal	Moïse Fortier	797
Conservative	Joseph Provencher	760

1872 Canadian federal election
Party	Candidate	Votes
Conservative	Joseph Duguay	1,047
Liberal	Roch Moïse Samuel Mignault	643

1874 Canadian federal election
Party	Candidate	Votes
Conservative	Charles-Ignace Gill	acclaimed

1878 Canadian federal election
Party	Candidate	Votes
Conservative	Charles-Ignace Gill	1,029
Unknown	F. Gouin	706

By-election on 7 July 1879
Party	Candidate	Votes
Conservative	Fabien Vanasse dit Vertefeuille	1,003
Unknown	F. Gouin	815
By-election called upon Mr. Gill's resignation, 19 May 1879

1882 Canadian federal election
Party	Candidate	Votes
Conservative	Fabien Vanasse dit Vertefeuille	1,049
Unknown	Victor Gladu	978

1887 Canadian federal election
Party	Candidate	Votes
Conservative	Fabien Vanasse dit Vertefeuille	1,333
Liberal	Roch Moïse Samuel Mignault	1,302

1891 Canadian federal election
Party	Candidate	Votes
Liberal	Roch Moïse Samuel Mignault	1,399
Conservative	Fabien Vanasse dit Vertefeuille	1,299

1896 Canadian federal election
Party	Candidate	Votes
Liberal	Roch Moïse Samuel Mignault	1,342
Conservative	Fabien Vanasse dit Vertefeuille	1,324

1900 Canadian federal election
Party	Candidate	Votes
Liberal	Roch Moïse Samuel Mignault	1,473
Conservative	Albéric-Archie Mondou	1,369

1904 Canadian federal election
Party	Candidate	Votes
Liberal	Oscar Gladu	2,026
Conservative	Ernest Pélissier	1,566

1908 Canadian federal election
Party	Candidate	Votes
Liberal	Oscar Gladu	1,846
Conservative	Joseph-Aldric Ouimet	1,758

1911 Canadian federal election
Party	Candidate	Votes
Conservative	Albéric-Archie Mondou	1,870
Liberal	Oscar Gladu	1,777

1917 Canadian federal election
Party	Candidate	Votes
Opposition (Laurier Liberals)	Oscar Gladu	3,148
Government (Unionist)	Aimé Chassé	464

Canadian federal by-election, 28 May 1921
Party	Candidate	Votes
Liberal	Aimé Boucher	4,251
Unknown	Albéric-Archie Mondou	2,608
Unknown	Joseph Lambert	467
By-election called upon Mr. Gladu's death, 5 December 1920

1921 Canadian federal election
Party	Candidate	Votes
Liberal	Aimé Boucher	4,130
Progressive	Rémi Plante	2,462

1925 Canadian federal election
Party	Candidate	Votes
Liberal	Aimé Boucher	3,438
Conservative	Joseph-Félix-Frédéric Boulais	2,754

1926 Canadian federal election
Party	Candidate	Votes
Liberal	Aimé Boucher	3,500
Conservative	Joseph-Félix-Frédéric Boulais	3,082

1930 Canadian federal election
Party	Candidate	Votes
Liberal	Aimé Boucher	3,505
Conservative	Paul-François Comtois	3,504

By-election on 23 October 1933
Party	Candidate	Votes
Liberal	Aimé Boucher	3,901
Conservative	Paul F. Comtois	3,817
By-election called upon Mr. Boucher's election being declared void, 23 December 1932

== See also ==
- Yamaska (provincial electoral district)
- Yamaska (Province of Canada electoral district)
- List of Canadian electoral districts
- Historical federal electoral districts of Canada
