= Désiré Olivier Bourbeau =

Canadian politician

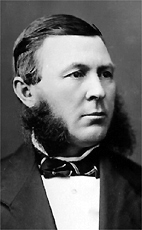

Member of the Canadian Parliament for Drummond—Arthabaska
- In office 1877–1887
- Preceded by: Wilfrid Laurier
- Succeeded by: Joseph Lavergne

Personal details
- Born: 21 September 1834 St-Pierre les Becquets, Lower Canada
- Died: 21 December 1900 (aged 66) Arthabaska, Quebec
- Party: Conservative Party
- Occupation: merchant

Désiré Olivier Bourbeau (21 September 1834 – 21 December 1900) was a Canadian politician and merchant.

The son of L. Bourbeau and Édesse Gauvreau, Bourbeau established himself as a merchant in Victoriaville. He married M.B. Bouchard. Bourbeau was a director of the Arthabaska Building Society, the Arthabaska Agricultural Society and the Mutual Insurance Company. He was elected to the House of Commons of Canada in 1877 in a by-election as a Member of the Conservative Party to represent the riding of Drummond—Arthabaska. He was re-elected in 1878 and 1882. Besides his federal political career, he was also mayor of Arthabaska, Quebec.

== Electoral record ==
1878 Canadian federal election: Drummond—Arthabaska
Party	Candidate	Votes
Conservative	Désiré Olivier Bourbeau	2,143
Unknown	L. Rainville	1,981
Source: Canadian Elections Database

1882 Canadian federal election: Drummond—Arthabaska
Party	Candidate	Votes
Conservative	Désiré Olivier Bourbeau	2,421
Unknown	L.J. Cannon	1,811
