= Pierre-Nérée Dorion =

Canadian politician

Pierre-Nérée Dorion (October 16, 1816 – 1874) was a land surveyor and political figure in Quebec, Canada. He represented Drummond—Arthabaska in the House of Commons of Canada from 1872 to 1874 as a Liberal member.

He was born in Sainte-Anne-de-la-Pérade, Lower Canada, the son of Pierre-Antoine Dorion and Genevieve Bureau, and educated at the Séminaire de Nicolet. In 1846, he married Mary Ann Marler. Dorion was mayor of Grantham and also served as warden for Drummond County.

His brother Antoine-Aimé Dorion also served in the House of Commons and his brother Jean-Baptiste-Éric Dorion served in the assembly for the Province of Canada.

1872 Canadian federal election: Drummond—Arthabaska
| Party | Candidate | Votes |
|---|---|---|
| Liberal | Pierre-Nérée Dorion | 1,251 |
| Unknown | Tessier | 1,197 |
| Unknown | Griffin | 95 |
Source: Canadian Elections Database
