= Florian Côté =

Canadian politician

- Official 1974 portrait

Member of Parliament for Nicolet—Yamaska
- In office September 1966 – June 1968

Member of Parliament for Richelieu
- In office June 1968 – March 1979

Personal details
- Born: 17 May 1929 Sainte-Brigitte-des-Saults, Quebec
- Died: 29 January 2002 (aged 72)
- Party: Liberal
- Profession: Farmer

Florian Côté (17 May 1929 – 29 January 2002) was a Liberal party member of the House of Commons of Canada. He was born in Sainte-Brigitte-des-Saults, Quebec and became a farmer by career.

He was first elected at the Nicolet—Yamaska riding in a 19 September 1966 by-election. In the next federal election in 1968, he was elected at Richelieu, and re-elected two more times there in the 1972 and 1974 federal elections. Côté left federal politics after completing his term in the 30th Canadian Parliament.
