= Arthur Gilbert (politician) =

Canadian politician

Arthur Gilbert (January 1, 1879 – July 1, 1932) was a Canadian politician, farmer and merchant in Quebec, Canada. Gilbert was elected to the House of Commons of Canada as a Nationalist in a 1910 by-election.

== Election victory ==
Gilbert's surprise victory in what had been a safe Liberal riding, occurred as a result of his opposition to the Laurier government's Naval Service Act. The Act was seen by Quebec nationalists, such as Henri Bourassa, as a sign of Laurier's support for British imperialism and, in particular, that Canada would send troops to support Britain in a future European war.

Gilbert's by-election victory in Drummond—Arthabaska, a riding once held by Laurier himself, was interpreted as a sign that the once solid support for Laurier's Liberals in Quebec was eroding, a trend that would contribute to Laurier's defeat at the hands of Robert Borden's Conservatives in the 1911 federal election. Gilbert's victory also indicated a growing nationalist mood in Quebec, which would later erupt in the Conscription Crisis of 1917.

Gilbert's political career was short-lived, however. He sat in parliament for less than a year before losing his seat in the 1911 election to Liberal Joseph Ovide Brouillard.

By-election on 3 November 1910 Lavergne called to the Senate
Party	Candidate	Votes
Nationalist	Arthur Gilbert	3,451
Liberal	Joseph Édouard Perreault	3,244

1911 Canadian federal election: Drummond—Arthabaska
Party	Candidate	Votes
Liberal	Joseph Ovide Brouillard	3,800
Nationalist	Arthur Gilbert	3,533
