= Renaud Chapdelaine =

Canadian politician

Renaud Chapdelaine (March 27, 1911 – September 1, 1971) was a Quebec lawyer and was briefly a Member of Parliament in the House of Commons of Canada.

Chapdelaine won an upset victory in a February 1949 by-election in Nicolet—Yamaska - the first francophone riding to be won in Quebec since the Conservative Party relaunched itself as the Progressive Conservatives in 1942. While in the previous election, the Progressive Conservative candidate received only 944 votes, Chapdelaine received 8,382 votes, just over 49% of the total vote and almost 300 votes more than his rival, Liberal Paul Trahan. The victory, in a riding that had not voted Tory since 1911, was seen as a major breakthrough for the Progressive Conservatives and for its new leader George A. Drew, one which made much more likely a Tory victory in the next federal election.

He was a supporter of the Union Nationale provincially and credited his victory to the voter support for the principle of an autonomous province opposed to the centralization of federal powers - a policy supported by both the UN and the Tories. Prime Minister Louis St. Laurent blamed Chapdelaine's victory on the presence of a third candidate, an Independent Liberal, who they argued split the Liberal vote. The Liberals subsequently claimed that Chapdelaine had run on isolationist and Quebec nationalist policies critical of the government's involvement in World War II and that his true allegiance was not to Drew but to Quebec Premier Maurice Duplessis.

In March 1949, Chapdelaine and Georges Heon, an Independent Conservative MP who had recently joined the Progressive Conservative caucus, signed a joint statement calling for improving the rights of Franco-Ontarians in regards to French language Separate Schools in Ontario. The Progressive Conservative Party of Ontario had traditionally opposed the extension of both funding for Catholic Separate Schools and French language education and Drew had been, until recently, the Premier of Ontario and leader of the provincial Tory party.

Chapdelaine was defeated four months after his initial victory, in the June 1949 federal election, as were the Progressive Conservatives nationally. While he increased his vote total to over 9,000 that was not enough to overcome Liberal contender Maurice Boisvert who defeated him by almost 400 votes in a straight two candidate race. Chapdelaine returned to private life and did not run in another federal election.
