= Roch Moïse Samuel Mignault =

Canadian politician

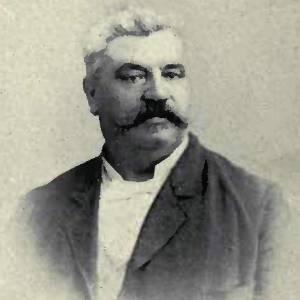
Roch-Moïse-Samuel Mignault

Roch-Moïse-Samuel Mignault (February 5, 1837 – March 26, 1913) was a physician and political figure in Quebec. He represented Yamaska in the House of Commons of Canada from 1891 to 1904 as a Liberal member.

He was born in Montreal, Lower Canada and educated at the Collège de l'Assomption. Mignault was mayor of Yamaska and also served as justice of the peace. Mignault was an unsuccessful candidate for a seat in the House of Commons in 1872 and 1887.
