= Joseph Duguay =

Canadian politician

Joseph Duguay (April 27, 1816 – August 2, 1891) was a Quebec merchant and political figure. He represented Yamaska in the House of Commons of Canada from 1873 to 1874 as a Conservative member.

He was born in Baie-du-Febvre, Lower Canada, the son of Antoine Duguay and Marie Chassé. In 1844, he married Anne-Scholastique-Olive Beauchemin. Duguay served as a captain in the local militia. He ran unsuccessfully for a seat in the Quebec assembly in 1871.

His son Joseph Nestor later became a member of the Quebec assembly.
