= Yamaska (provincial electoral district) =

Coordinates: 46.089°N 72.808°W

Quebec electoral district

Defunct provincial electoral district
- Legislature: National Assembly of Quebec
- District created: 1867
- District abolished: 1972
- First contested: 1867
- Last contested: 1970

Yamaska (French pronunciation: [jamaska]) was a provincial electoral district in the Montérégie region of Quebec, Canada.

It was created for the 1867 election (and an electoral district of that name existed earlier in the Legislative Assembly of the Province of Canada and the Legislative Assembly of Lower Canada). Its final election was in 1970. It disappeared in the 1973 election and its successor electoral district was Nicolet-Yamaska.

== Members of the Legislative Assembly / National Assembly ==
- Louis-Adélard Sénécal, Liberal (1867–1871)
- Charles-Ignace Gill, Conservative Party (1871–1874)
- Joseph-Nestor Duguay, Conservative Party (1874–1875)
- Jonathan Saxton Campbell Würtele, Liberal – Conservative Party (1875–1886)
- Victor Gladu, Liberal (1886–1897)
- Albéric-Archie Mondou, Conservative Party (1897)
- Victor Gladu, Liberal (1897)
- Louis-Jules Allard, Liberal (1897–1905)
- Guillaume-Édouard Ouellette, Liberal (1905–1923)
- David Laperrière, Liberal (1923–1931)
- Antonio Élie, Conservative Party – Union Nationale (1931–1966)
- Paul Shooner, Union Nationale (1966–1970)
- Benjamin Faucher, Liberal (1970–1973)

== See also ==
- Yamaska (federal electoral district)
