= Drummond—Arthabaska =

Former federal electoral district in Quebec, Canada

Quebec electoral district

Defunct federal electoral district
- Legislature: House of Commons
- District created: 1867
- District abolished: 1966
- First contested: 1867
- Last contested: 1965

Drummond—Arthabaska was a federal electoral district in Quebec, Canada, that was represented in the House of Commons of Canada from 1867 to 1968.

It was created by the British North America Act, 1867. It was amalgamated into the Richmond, Drummond and Lotbinière electoral districts in 1966.

== Members of Parliament ==
This riding elected the following members of Parliament:

Parliament	Years	Member	Party
Drummond—Arthabaska
1st	1867–1872	Louis-Adélard Senécal	Conservative
2nd	1872–1874	Pierre-Nérée Dorion	Liberal
3rd	1874–1877	Wilfrid Laurier	Liberal
3rd	1877–1878	Désiré Olivier Bourbeau	Conservative
4th	1878–1882	Désiré Olivier Bourbeau	Conservative
5th	1882–1887	Désiré Olivier Bourbeau	Conservative
6th	1887–1891	Joseph Lavergne	Liberal
7th	1891–1896	Joseph Lavergne	Liberal
8th	1896–1897	Joseph Lavergne	Liberal
8th	1897–1900	Louis Lavergne	Liberal
9th	1900–1904	Louis Lavergne	Liberal
10th	1904–1908	Louis Lavergne	Liberal
11th	1908–1910	Louis Lavergne	Liberal
11th	1910–1911	Arthur Gilbert	Nationalist
12th	1911–1917	Joseph Ovide Brouillard	Liberal
13th	1917–1921	Joseph Ovide Brouillard	Opposition (Laurier Liberals)
14th	1921–1925	Napoléon Kemner Laflamme	Liberal
15th	1925–1926	Wilfrid Girouard	Liberal
16th	1926–1930	Wilfrid Girouard	Liberal
17th	1930–1935	Wilfrid Girouard	Liberal
18th	1935–1940	Wilfrid Girouard	Liberal
19th	1940–1945	Armand Cloutier	Liberal
20th	1945–1949	Armand Cloutier	Liberal
21st	1949–1953	Armand Cloutier	Liberal
22nd	1953–1957	Armand Cloutier	Liberal
23rd	1957–1958	Samuel Boulanger	Independent Liberal
24th	1958–1962	Samuel Boulanger	Liberal
25th	1962–1963	David Ouellet	Social Credit
26th	1963–1965	Jean-Luc Pépin	Liberal
27th	1965–1968	Jean-Luc Pépin	Liberal
Riding dissolved into Richmond, Drummond and Lotbinière

== Election results ==
1867 Canadian federal election
Party	Candidate	Votes
Conservative	Louis-Adélard Sénécal	1,135
Unknown	M. Houle	1,111
Eligible voters		4,028
Source: Canadian Parliamentary Guide, 1871

1872 Canadian federal election
Party	Candidate	Votes
Liberal	Pierre-Nérée Dorion	1,251
Unknown	Tessier	1,197
Unknown	Griffin	95
Source: Canadian Elections Database

1874 Canadian federal election
Party	Candidate	Votes	%	Elected
Liberal	Wilfrid Laurier	778	52.64	✓
Unknown	Tessier	700	47.36	
Total valid votes		1478	100.00	
Source(s) "Drummond--Arthabaska, Quebec (1867-08-06 - 1968-04-22)". History of Federal Ridings Since 1867. Library of Parliament.

Canadian federal by-election, October 27, 1877 Federal Ministerial by-election for Laurier's appointed as Minister of Inland Revenue
Party	Candidate	Votes	%	Elected
Conservative	Désiré Olivier Bourbeau	1,902	50.29	✓
Liberal	Wilfrid Laurier	1,880	49.71	
Total valid votes		3,782	100.00	
Source(s) "Drummond--Arthabaska, Quebec (1867-08-06 - 1968-04-22)". History of Federal Ridings Since 1867. Library of Parliament. Ministerial by-election, October 27, 1877: Drummond—Arthabaska, Quebec on Wilfrid Laurier's appointment as Minister of Inland Revenue, October 8, 1877

1878 Canadian federal election
Party	Candidate	Votes
Conservative	Désiré Olivier Bourbeau	2,143
Unknown	L. Rainville	1,981

1882 Canadian federal election
Party	Candidate	Votes
Conservative	Désiré Olivier Bourbeau	2,421
Unknown	L.J. Cannon	1,811

1887 Canadian federal election
Party	Candidate	Votes
Liberal	Joseph Lavergne	acclaimed

1891 Canadian federal election
Party	Candidate	Votes
Liberal	Joseph Lavergne	3,159
Conservative	L.P.E. Crépeau	2,197

1896 Canadian federal election
Party	Candidate	Votes
Liberal	Joseph Lavergne	3,561
Conservative	E. Désy	2,255

By-election on 13 November 1897 Lavergne nominated as Puisne Judge of the Superior Court of the Province of Quebec, 4 August 1897
Party	Candidate	Votes
Liberal	Louis Lavergne	3,022
Conservative	Auguste Noel	1,374

1900 Canadian federal election
Party	Candidate	Votes
Liberal	Louis Lavergne	acclaimed

1904 Canadian federal election
Party	Candidate	Votes
Liberal	Louis Lavergne	3,753
Conservative	Stanislas Montplaisir	1,277

1908 Canadian federal election
Party	Candidate	Votes
Liberal	Louis Lavergne	3,754
Independent Liberal	Luc Louis Philippe Poulin de Courval	2,920

By-election on 3 November 1910 Lavergne called to the Senate
Party	Candidate	Votes
Nationalist	Arthur Gilbert	3,451
Liberal	Joseph Édouard Perreault	3,244

1911 Canadian federal election
Party	Candidate	Votes
Liberal	Joseph Ovide Brouillard	3,800
Nationalist	Arthur Gilbert	3,533

1917 Canadian federal election
Party	Candidate	Votes
Opposition (Laurier Liberals)	Joseph Ovide Brouillard	acclaimed

1921 Canadian federal election
Party	Candidate	Votes
Liberal	Napoléon Kemner Laflamme	10,280
Progressive	Wilfrid Blanchard	2,154
Conservative	Wilfrid Laliberté	1,902
Independent	Joseph Albert Nadeau	1,503

1925 Canadian federal election
Party	Candidate	Votes
Liberal	Wilfrid Girouard	9,301
Conservative	Joseph Marier	3,926
Farmer	Luc Louis Philippe Poulin de Courval	1,130

1926 Canadian federal election
Party	Candidate	Votes
Liberal	Wilfrid Girouard	9,600
Conservative	Henri-Édouard St-Sauveur	3,814

1930 Canadian federal election
Party	Candidate	Votes
Liberal	Wilfrid Girouard	11,241
Conservative	Agésilas Kirouac	7,784
Source: lop.parl.ca

1935 Canadian federal election
Party	Candidate	Votes
Liberal	Wilfrid Girouard	14,125
Conservative	Roland Provencher	7,411
Reconstruction	Élie Lalumière	1,067

1940 Canadian federal election
Party	Candidate	Votes
Liberal	Armand Cloutier	12,145
Independent Liberal	Joseph Garon	10,853

1945 Canadian federal election
Party	Candidate	Votes
Liberal	Armand Cloutier	14,805
Independent	Joseph Garon	8,547
Bloc populaire	Raymond Beaudet	5,423
Social Credit	Joseph-Richard Aubry	1,037

1949 Canadian federal election
Party	Candidate	Votes
Liberal	Armand Cloutier	16,899
Union des électeurs	Antonio Lamaire	4,251
Progressive Conservative	Jos.-Edmond Demers	1,804

1953 Canadian federal election
Party	Candidate	Votes
Liberal	Armand Cloutier	15,870
Progressive Conservative	Roland Provencher	13,325

1957 Canadian federal election
Party	Candidate	Votes
Independent Liberal	Samuel Boulanger	11,462
Liberal	Armand Cloutier	10,512
Progressive Conservative	Victor Paul	10,327

1958 Canadian federal election
Party	Candidate	Votes
Liberal	Samuel Boulanger	17,288
Progressive Conservative	Victor Paul	16,522
Social Credit	Sylvio Mélancon	1,308

1962 Canadian federal election
Party	Candidate	Votes
Social Credit	David Ouellet	17,597
Liberal	Samuel Boulanger	13,414
Progressive Conservative	Victor Paul	7,050

1963 Canadian federal election
Party	Candidate	Votes
Liberal	Jean-Luc Pépin	17,338
Social Credit	David Ouellet	14,739
Progressive Conservative	J.-Claude Couture	3,416
New Democratic	Pierre Lambert	1,456

1965 Canadian federal election
Party	Candidate	Votes
Liberal	Jean-Luc Pépin	15,179
Ralliement créditiste	André Fortin	8,518
Progressive Conservative	Pierre Jutras	7,413
Independent	Sam Boulanger	6,068
New Democratic	Charles-Émile Riendeau	1,660

== See also ==
- List of Canadian electoral districts
- Historical federal electoral districts of Canada
