= Saint-David, Quebec =

Saint-David
- Municipality
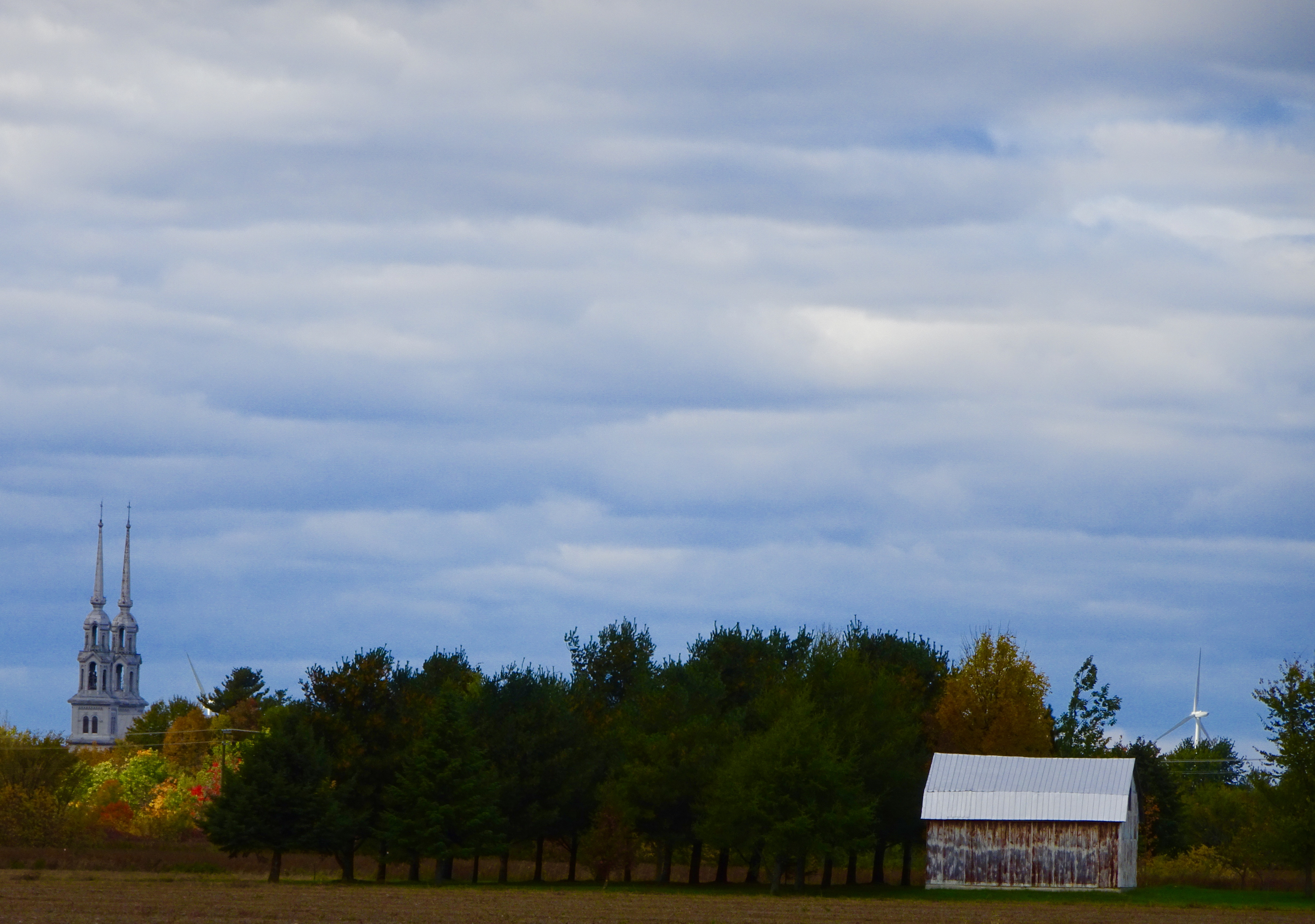
- Church of Saint-David

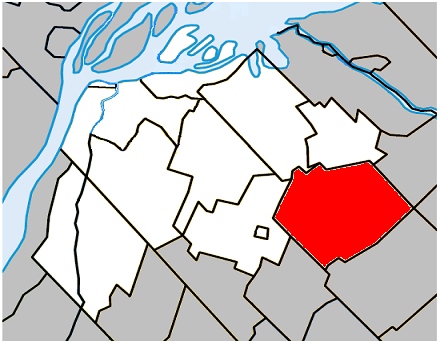
- Location within Pierre-De Saurel RCM

- Location in southern Quebec
- Coordinates: 45°57′N 72°51′W
- Country: Canada
- Province: Quebec
- Region: Montérégie
- RCM: Pierre-De Saurel
- Constituted: July 1, 1855

Government
  - Mayor: Richard Potvin
  - Federal riding: Bécancour—Nicolet—Saurel—Alnôbak
  - Prov. riding: Richelieu

Area
  - Total: 92.70 km^{2} (35.79 sq mi)
  - Land: 92.97 km^{2} (35.90 sq mi)
- There is an apparent contradiction between two authoritative sources

Population (2021)
  - Total: 872
  - Density: 9.4/km^{2} (24/sq mi)
  - Pop 2016-2021: ▲6.7%
  - Dwellings: 398
- Time zone: UTC−5 (EST)
  - Summer (DST): UTC−4 (EDT)
- Postal code(s): J0G 1L0
- Area codes: 450 and 579
- Highways: R-122
- Website: www.stdavid.qc.ca

Saint-David is a municipality in the Pierre-De Saurel Regional County Municipality, in the Montérégie region of Quebec. The population as of the Canada 2021 Census was 872.

== Demographics ==
=== Population ===
Population trend:

| Census | Population | Change (%) |
|---|---|---|
| 2021 | 872 | ▲6.7% |
| 2016 | 817 | ▼1.8% |
| 2011 | 832 | ▲4.8% |
| 2006 | 794 | ▼10.1% |
| 2001 | 883 | ▲1.1% |
| 1996 | 873 | ▼9.5% |
| 1991 | 965 | ▼2.0% |
| 1986 | 985 | ▼4.6% |
| 1981 | 1,033 | ▼0.5% |
| 1976 | 1,038 | ▼11.2% |
| 1971 | 1,169 | ▼0.2% |
| 1966 | 1,171 | ▲0.8% |
| 1961 | 1,162 | ▼9.6% |
| 1956 | 1,285 | ▼1.8% |
| 1951 | 1,308 | ▼11.4% |
| 1941 | 1,476 | ▲0.1% |
| 1931 | 1,475 | ▼8.8% |
| 1921 | 1,618 | ▼15.3% |
| 1911 | 1,911 | ▼6.8% |
| 1901 | 2,050 | ▼11.3% |
| 1891 | 2,312 | ▼25.6% |
| 1881 | 3,106 | ▲5.9% |
| 1871 | 2,934 | ▼25.2% |
| 1861 | 3,925 | N/A |

=== Language ===
Mother tongue language (2021)

| Language | Population | Pct (%) |
|---|---|---|
| French only | 835 | 95.4% |
| English only | 15 | 1.7% |
| Both English & French | 5 | 0.6% |
| Other languages | 20 | 2.3% |

== See also ==
- List of municipalities in Quebec
