= Saint-François-du-Lac =

- Municipality
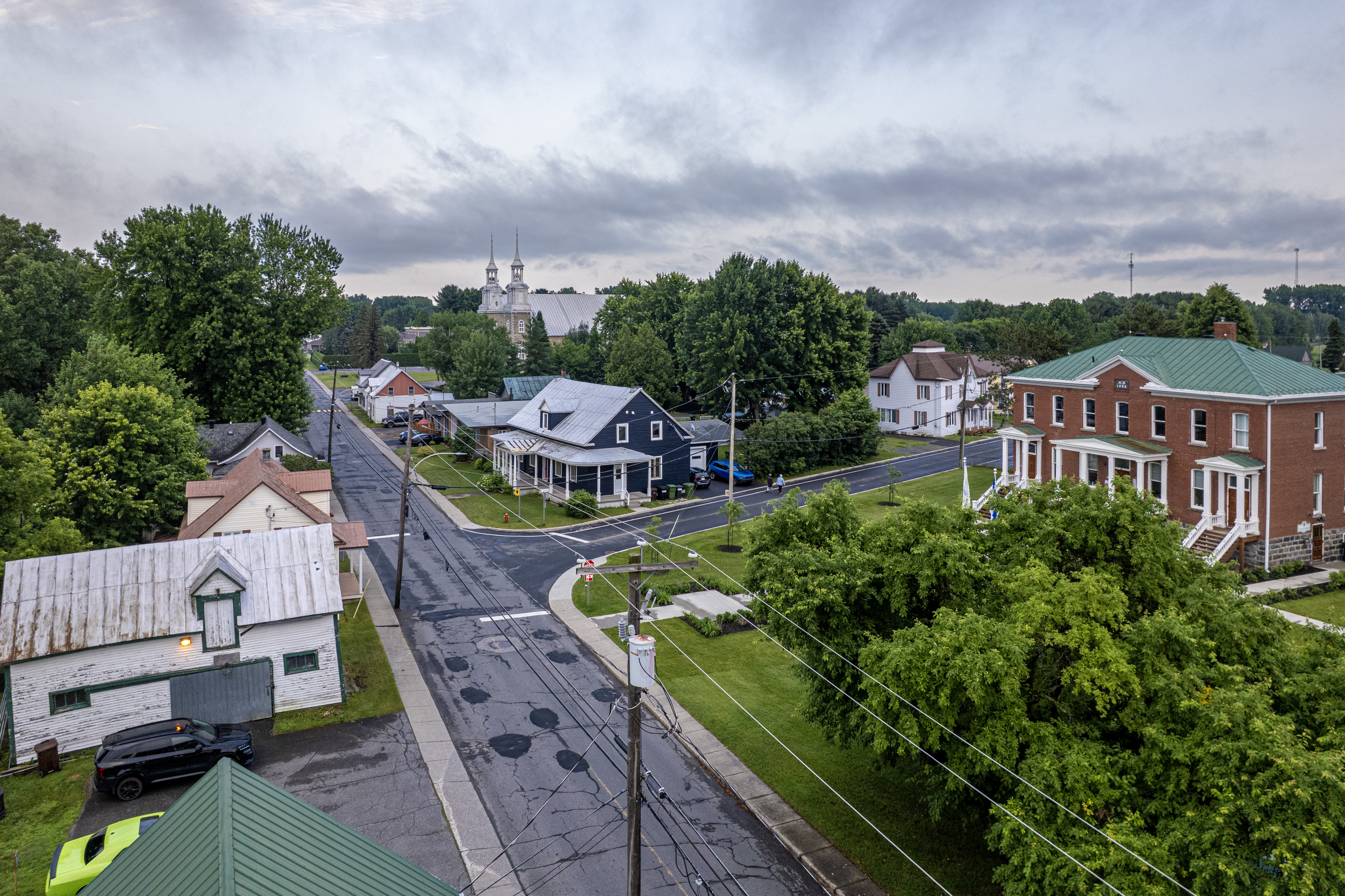
- Aerial view of Saint-François-du-Lac

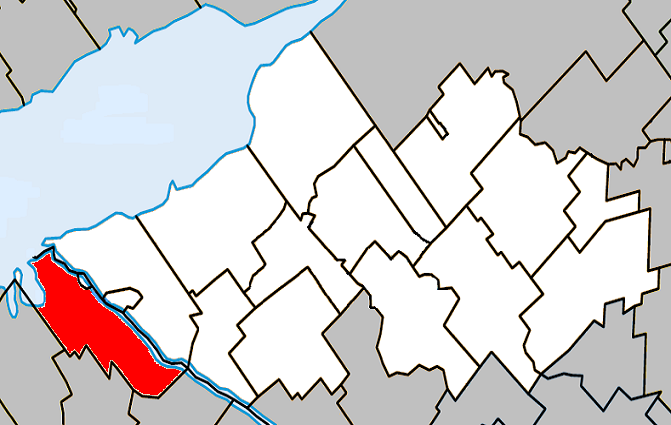
- Location within Nicolet-Yamaska RCM

- Location in southern Quebec
- Coordinates: 46°04′N 72°50′W
- Country: Canada
- Province: Quebec
- Region: Centre-du-Québec
- RCM: Nicolet-Yamaska
- Constituted: December 31, 1997

Government
  - Mayor: Pascal Théroux
  - Federal riding: Bécancour—Nicolet—Saurel—Alnôbak
  - Prov. riding: Nicolet-Bécancour

Area
  - Total: 83.40 km^{2} (32.20 sq mi)
  - Land: 63.80 km^{2} (24.63 sq mi)

Population (2021)
  - Total: 1,898
  - Density: 29.7/km^{2} (77/sq mi)
  - Pop 2016-2021: ▼3.4%
  - Dwellings: 1,065
- Time zone: UTC−5 (EST)
  - Summer (DST): UTC−4 (EDT)
- Postal code(s): J0G 1M0
- Area codes: 450 and 579
- Highways: R-132; R-143
- Website: www.saint-francois-du-lac.ca

Saint-François-du-Lac (French pronunciation: [sɛ̃ fʁɑ̃swa dy lak]) is a community in the Nicolet-Yamaska Regional County Municipality of Quebec, Canada. The population as of the Canada 2021 Census was 1,898. It is located six miles from the confluence of the Saint Lawrence and Saint-François rivers, and about five miles from Lac Saint-Pierre (hence its name, "Saint-François of the lake").

Saint-François-du-Lac faces the Abenaki village of Odanak and town of Pierreville, two communities on the opposite shore of the Rivière Saint-François. Québec routes 132 and 143 intersect in the town, route 132 crosses the river into Odanak and Pierreville.

== History ==
Saint-François-du-Lac is an historic French community on the west side of the Rivière St. François and should not be confused with the historic Abenaki St-François-de-Sales mission located on the east side of the river which is also known as St. Francis (Odanak). St-François-de-Sales was founded in 1683 as a French Jesuit mission in Levis at the confluence of the St. Lawrence and Chaudière rivers, opposite Québec city. In 1700 the Jesuits relocated the mission to the Rivière St. François, near its present site. From Gordon M. Day, "English writers have always referred to both the French and Abenaki communities as St. Francis," but the French and the Abenakis separated the two—the French, Saint-François-du-Lac was named Za Plaswá by the Abenakis, and St-François-de-Sales was called Plaswa Ksal. The name De Sales continues into the present in the Abenaki community today.^{5}

=== Establishment of a French and an Abenaki community on the St. Francis River ===
One of the first seigneurs of Saint-François-du-Lac was Jean Crevier de Saint-François who purchased the seigneury from his brother-in-law Pierre Boucher in 1673. Crevier occupied this land circa1680 and it has been told that he was visited by some Abenakis who said he had settled on their territory. Subsequent to a meeting and an exchange of gifts, the Abenakis were satisfied and left but they continued to visit Crevier's farm frequently.

There were bands of Sokokis and Abenakis in the area and Native children's baptisms can be found in local parish records. After the church at Saint-François-du-Lac opened in 1687 to serve the French settlers, Sokoki children were also brought to be baptized. In 1790 the first baptism of an Abenaki child occurred.^{17} The clergy at Saint-François-du-Lac continued to serve Native families who came to them because they lacked their own missionary. The parish church was located at Pointe du Moulin, on the île du Fort. Soldiers from the garrison are present in these records as godfathers in the baptisms. The Sokokis who lived a few miles north and traveled by canoe, did not bring godparents with them and relied on the military men.^{20}

It became clear that having more Abenaki permanently in the area would be a deterrent to the marauding Iroquois and would protect New France. Chevier himself had been captured by the Iroquois in August 1693, and ransomed when he was at the point of death by Major Peter Schuyler, commandant of the Albany garrison, but he died shortly thereafter. More Native refugees were beginning to arrive in the Abenaki settlements from distant areas. The Jesuit fathers sought to establish a mission there and to transfer the St-François-de-Sales mission from the Chaudière to this site. The French landholders of Saint-François-du-Lac were consulted and they agreed to give land for a mission.^{22} St-François-de-Sales mission was thus moved to the St. Francis River into land across from the Saint-François-du-Lac French community. A fort was built to protect this mission with a palisade of fifteen foot stakes and stone bastions at each of the four corners.^{23}

The two settlements continued their separate, parallel lives, the Abenaki at their mission and the French landowners at Saint-François-du-Lac with trade between the two. The seigneurs Crevier and Hertel, who had given land to establish this mission, potentially lost rental income from new French arrivals seeking farmland, but they were more than compensated by their trade agreement with the neighboring Abenakis.^{36}

=== Early Church and founding of the Parish of Saint-François-Xavier ===
1687 was the founding of the church at Sant-François-du-Lac and the building of Fort Saint-François also known as Fort Crevier. The first chapel, made of wood, was built in 1688 within the garrison's walls. From 1689 to 1693 the fort was raided by the Iroquois and greatly damaged, and the chapel was burned. A second chapel was erected in 1698. The parish of Saint-François-Xavier was founded in 1714 and continues today. A stone church was erected between 1731 and 1739. This church building was replaced in 1845-1849 and the 18th C. building razed. It is unknown what role Saint-François-du-Lac played in aiding Abenaki survivors of the raid on their village by Major Rogers during the morning of October 4, 1759. It is known that the Abenakis fled to other Indian villages and even to a Mohawk mission, not to their French neighbors nearby, although the Abenaki village burning would have been quite visible from Saint-François-du-Lac. The British did not attack the French.

== Demographics ==
In the 2021 Census of Population conducted by Statistics Canada, Saint-François-du-Lac had a population of 1,898 living in 924 of its 1,065 total private dwellings, a change of −3.4% from its 2016 population of 1,965. With a land area of 63.80 km^{2} (24.63 sq mi), it had a population density of 29.7/km^{2} (77.1/sq mi) in 2021.

=== Population ===
Population trend:

Census	Population	Change (%)
2021	1,898	▼3.4%
2016	1,965	▲0.4%
2011	1,957	▼2.2%
2006	2,002	▲2.1%
2001	1,976	N/A

=== Language ===
Mother tongue language (2021)

Language	Population	Pct (%)
French only	1,870	98.4%
English only	10	0.5%
Both English and French	5	0.3%
Other languages	15	0.8%

== See also ==
- List of municipalities in Quebec
- 20th-century municipal history of Quebec
