= List of members of the Canadian House of Commons (R) =

== Ra ==
- Jean-Paul Racine b. 1928 first elected in 1958 as Liberal member for Beauce, Quebec.
- Bob Rae b. 1948 first elected in 1978 as New Democratic Party member for Broadview, Ontario.
- John Rafferty b. 1953 first elected in 2008 as New Democratic member for Thunder Bay—Rainy River, Ontario.
- Samuel Victor Railton b. 1906 first elected in 1972 as Liberal member for Welland, Ontario.
- Marke Raines b. 1927 first elected in 1974 as Liberal member for Burnaby—Seymour, British Columbia.
- Joseph Hormisdas Rainville b. 1875 first elected in 1911 as Conservative member for Chambly—Verchères, Quebec.
- Lisa Raitt b. 1968 first elected in 2008 as Conservative member for Halton, Ontario.
- James Rajotte b. 1970 first elected in 2000 as Canadian Alliance member for Edmonton Southwest, Alberta.
- James Layton Ralston b. 1881 first elected in 1926 as Liberal member for Shelburne—Yarmouth, Nova Scotia.
- Jack Ramsay b. 1937 first elected in 1993 as Reform member for Crowfoot, Alberta.
- Jacques Ramsay first elected in 2025 as Liberal member for La Prairie—Atateken, Quebec.
- Tracey Ramsey b. 1971 first elected in 2015 as New Democratic Party member for Essex, Ontario.
- Aslam Rana first elected in 2025 as Liberal member for Hamilton Centre, Ontario.
- James Palmer Rankin b. 1855 first elected in 1908 as Liberal member for Perth North, Ontario.
- John Rankin b. 1820 first elected in 1867 as Conservative member for Renfrew North, Ontario.
- Murray Rankin b. 1950 first elected in 2012 as New Democratic Party member for Victoria, British Columbia.
- Reynold Rapp b. 1901 first elected in 1958 as Progressive Conservative member for Humboldt—Melfort, Saskatchewan.
- Yasmin Ratansi b. 1951 first elected in 2004 as Liberal member for Don Valley East, Ontario.
- J.-Georges Ratelle b. 1883 first elected in 1949 as Liberal member for Lafontaine, Quebec.
- Brent Rathgeber b. 1964 first elected in 2008 as Conservative member for Edmonton—St. Albert, Alberta.
- Valentine Ratz b. 1848 first elected in 1896 as Liberal member for Middlesex North, Ontario.
- Mathieu Ravignat b. 1973 first elected in 2011 as New Democratic Party member for Pontiac, Quebec.
- Donald Paul Ravis b. 1940 first elected in 1984 as Progressive Conservative member for Saskatoon East, Saskatchewan.
- William Hallett Ray b. 1825 first elected in 1867 as Anti-Confederate member for Annapolis, Nova Scotia.
- Alain Rayes b. 1971 first elected in 2015 as Conservative member for Richmond—Arthabaska, Quebec.
- Léon-Joseph Raymond b. 1901 first elected in 1945 as Liberal member for Wright, Quebec.
- Maxime Raymond b. 1883 first elected in 1925 as Liberal member for Beauharnois, Quebec.
- Raymond Raymond b. 1905 first elected in 1957 as Liberal member for Terrebonne, Quebec.
- William Gawtress Raymond b. 1855 first elected in 1921 as Liberal member for Brantford, Ontario.
- Francine Raynault b. 1945 first elected in 2011 as New Democratic Party member for Joliette, Quebec.

== Re ==
- Charles Edward Rea b. 1902 first elected in 1955 as Progressive Conservative member for Spadina, Ontario.
- Joseph Read b. 1849 first elected in 1917 as Laurier Liberal member for Prince, Prince Edward Island.
- Robert Read b. 1814 first elected in 1867 as Conservative member for Hastings East, Ontario.
- Brad Redekopp first elected in 2019 as Conservative member for Saskatoon West, Saskatchewan.
- James Redford b. 1821 first elected in 1867 as Liberal member for Perth North, Ontario.
- Daniel Lee Redman b. 1889 first elected in 1917 as Unionist member for East Calgary, Alberta.
- Karen Redman b. 1953 first elected in 1997 as Liberal member for Kitchener Centre, Ontario.
- Alan Redway b. 1935 first elected in 1984 as Progressive Conservative member for York East, Ontario.
- Julian Alexander Arnott Reed b. 1936 first elected in 1993 as Liberal member for Halton—Peel, Ontario.
- William Samuel Reed b. 1864 first elected in 1921 as Progressive member for Frontenac, Ontario.
- Geoff Regan b. 1959 first elected in 1993 as Liberal member for Halifax West, Nova Scotia.
- Gerald Regan b. 1929 first elected in 1963 as Liberal member for Halifax, Nova Scotia.
- Erhart Regier b. 1916 first elected in 1953 as Cooperative Commonwealth Federation member for Burnaby—Coquitlam, British Columbia.
- Roger E. Régimbal b. 1921 first elected in 1965 as Progressive Conservative member for Argenteuil—Deux-Montagnes, Quebec.
- Laurier Arthur Régnier b. 1903 first elected in 1958 as Progressive Conservative member for St. Boniface, Manitoba.
- Ian Angus Ross Reid b. 1952 first elected in 1988 as Progressive Conservative member for St. John's East, Newfoundland and Labrador.
- James Reid b. 1839 first elected in 1900 as Liberal member for Restigouche, New Brunswick.
- James Reid b. 1839 first elected in 1881 as Liberal-Conservative member for Cariboo, British Columbia.
- John Dowsley Reid b. 1859 first elected in 1891 as Conservative member for Grenville South, Ontario.
- John Flaws Reid b. 1860 first elected in 1917 as Liberal member for Mackenzie, Saskatchewan.
- John Mercer Reid b. 1937 first elected in 1965 as Liberal member for Kenora—Rainy River, Ontario.
- Joseph Lloyd Reid b. 1917 first elected in 1979 as Progressive Conservative member for St. Catharines, Ontario.
- Scott Reid b. 1964 first elected in 2000 as Canadian Alliance member for Lanark—Carleton, Ontario.
- Thomas Reid b. 1886 first elected in 1930 as Liberal member for New Westminster, British Columbia.
- Peter Reilly b. 1933 first elected in 1972 as Progressive Conservative member for Ottawa West, Ontario.
- John Henry Reimer b. 1936 first elected in 1979 as Progressive Conservative member for Kitchener, Ontario.
- Russell Earl Reinke b. 1921 first elected in 1953 as Liberal member for Hamilton South, Ontario.
- Michelle Rempel Garner b. 1980 first elected in 2011 as Conservative member for Calgary Centre-North, Alberta.
- Auguste Renaud b. 1835 first elected in 1867 as Liberal member for Kent, New Brunswick.
- Almon Secord Rennie b. 1882 first elected in 1934 as Liberal member for Oxford South, Ontario.
- George Septimus Rennie b. 1866 first elected in 1926 as Conservative member for Hamilton East, Ontario.
- John Reynolds b. 1942 first elected in 1972 as Progressive Conservative member for Burnaby—Richmond—Delta, British Columbia.

== Rh ==
- Eugène Rhéaume b. 1932 first elected in 1963 as Progressive Conservative member for Northwest Territories, Northwest Territories.
- Joseph-Théodule Rhéaume b. 1874 first elected in 1922 as Liberal member for Jacques Cartier, Quebec.
- Pierre Auguste Martial Rhéaume b. 1882 first elected in 1930 as Liberal member for St. Johns—Iberville, Quebec.
- Edgar Nelson Rhodes b. 1877 first elected in 1908 as Conservative member for Cumberland, Nova Scotia.

== Ric ==
- Guy Ricard b. 1942 first elected in 1984 as Progressive Conservative member for Laval, Quebec.
- Théogène Ricard b. 1909 first elected in 1957 as Progressive Conservative member for Saint-Hyacinthe—Bagot, Quebec.
- Charles Richard b. 1900 first elected in 1958 as Progressive Conservative member for Kamouraska, Quebec.
- Clovis-Thomas Richard b. 1892 first elected in 1945 as Liberal member for Gloucester, New Brunswick.
- Édouard Émery Richard b. 1844 first elected in 1872 as Liberal member for Mégantic, Quebec.
- Jean-Thomas Richard b. 1907 first elected in 1945 as Liberal member for Ottawa East, Ontario.
- Joseph-Adolphe Richard b. 1887 first elected in 1949 as Liberal member for Saint-Maurice—Laflèche, Quebec.
- Albert Norton Richards b. 1822 first elected in 1872 as Liberal member for Leeds South, Ontario.
- Blake Richards b. 1974 first elected in 2008 as Conservative member for Wild Rose, Alberta.
- James William Richards b. 1850 first elected in 1908 as Liberal member for Prince, Prince Edward Island.
- Claude Sartoris Richardson b. 1900 first elected in 1954 as Liberal member for St. Lawrence—St. George, Quebec.
- George Richardson b. 1917 first elected in 1979 as Progressive Conservative member for Humboldt—Lake Centre, Saskatchewan.
- James Armstrong Richardson b. 1922 first elected in 1968 as Liberal member for Winnipeg South, Manitoba.
- John Richardson b. 1932 first elected in 1993 as Liberal member for Perth—Wellington—Waterloo, Ontario.
- Lee Richardson b. 1947 first elected in 1988 as Progressive Conservative member for Calgary Southeast, Alberta.
- Matthew Kendal Richardson b. 1839 first elected in 1900 as Liberal-Conservative member for Grey South, Ontario.
- Robert Lorne Richardson b. 1860 first elected in 1896 as Liberal member for Lisgar, Manitoba.
- Robin Mark Richardson b. 1942 first elected in 1979 as Progressive Conservative member for Beaches, Ontario.
- Matthew Henry Richey b. 1828 first elected in 1878 as Liberal-Conservative member for Halifax, Nova Scotia.
- Wilbert Franklin Rickard b. 1884 first elected in 1935 as Liberal member for Durham, Ontario.
- Greg Rickford b. 1967 first elected in 2008 as Conservative member for Kenora, Ontario.

== Rid–Riv ==
- George Saunders Rideout b. 1945 first elected in 1988 as Liberal member for Moncton, New Brunswick.
- Margaret Rideout b. 1923 first elected in 1964 as Liberal member for Westmorland, New Brunswick.
- Sherwood Rideout b. 1917 first elected in 1962 as Liberal member for Westmorland, New Brunswick.
- Timothy Byron Rider b. 1848 first elected in 1891 as Liberal member for Stanstead, Quebec.
- Louis Riel b. 1844 first elected in 1873 as Independent member for Provencher, Manitoba.
- Nelson Riis b. 1942 first elected in 1980 as New Democratic Party member for Kamloops—Shuswap, British Columbia.
- Daniel Aloysius Riley b. 1916 first elected in 1949 as Liberal member for St. John—Albert, New Brunswick.
- George Riley b. 1843 first elected in 1902 as Liberal member for Victoria, British Columbia.
- Côme Isaïe Rinfret b. 1847 first elected in 1878 as Liberal member for Lotbinière, Quebec.
- Édouard-Gabriel Rinfret b. 1905 first elected in 1945 as Liberal member for Outremont, Quebec.
- Louis Édouard Fernand Rinfret b. 1883 first elected in 1920 as Liberal member for St. James, Quebec.
- Maurice Rinfret b. 1915 first elected in 1962 as Liberal member for Saint-Jacques, Quebec.
- Bob Ringma b. 1928 first elected in 1993 as Reform member for Nanaimo—Cowichan, British Columbia.
- Pierrette Ringuette b. 1955 first elected in 1993 as Liberal member for Madawaska—Victoria, New Brunswick.
- Louis Joseph Riopel b. 1841 first elected in 1882 as Conservative member for Bonaventure, Quebec.
- Jean Rioux b. 1953 first elected in 2015 as Liberal member for Saint-Jean, Quebec.
- Ronald Stuart Ritchie b. 1918 first elected in 1979 as Progressive Conservative member for York East, Ontario.
- William Gordon Ritchie b. 1918 first elected in 1968 as Progressive Conservative member for Dauphin, Manitoba.
- Gerry Ritz b. 1951 first elected in 1997 as Reform member for Battlefords—Lloydminster, Saskatchewan.
- Louis Alfred Adhémar Rivet b. 1873 first elected in 1904 as Liberal member for Hochelaga, Quebec.

== Rob ==
- James Alexander Robb b. 1859 first elected in 1908 as Liberal member for Huntingdon, Quebec.
- Eusèbe Roberge b. 1874 first elected in 1922 as Liberal member for Mégantic, Quebec.
- Gabriel Roberge b. 1918 first elected in 1958 as Liberal member for Mégantic, Quebec.
- Louis-Édouard Roberge b. 1896 first elected in 1949 as Liberal member for Stanstead, Quebec.
- Anna Roberts b. 1957 first elected in 2021 as Conservative member for King—Vaughan, Ontario.
- John Roberts b. 1933 first elected in 1968 as Liberal member for York—Simcoe, Ontario.
- Alexander Robertson b. 1838 first elected in 1882 as Conservative member for Hastings West, Ontario.
- Frederick Greystock Robertson b. 1909 first elected in 1949 as Liberal member for Northumberland, Ontario.
- Gregor Robertson b. 1964 first elected in 2025 as Liberal member for Vancouver Fraserview—South Burnaby, British Columbia.
- James Edwin Robertson b. 1840 first elected in 1882 as Liberal member for King's County, Prince Edward Island.
- John Ross Robertson b. 1841 first elected in 1896 as Independent Conservative member for Toronto East, Ontario.
- Thomas Robertson b. 1827 first elected in 1878 as Liberal member for Hamilton, Ontario.
- Thomas Robertson b. 1852 first elected in 1878 as Liberal member for Shelburne, Nova Scotia.
- Albany M. Robichaud b. 1903 first elected in 1952 as Progressive Conservative member for Gloucester, New Brunswick.
- Fernand Robichaud b. 1939 first elected in 1984 as Liberal member for Westmorland—Kent, New Brunswick.
- Hédard-J. Robichaud b. 1911 first elected in 1953 as Liberal member for Gloucester, New Brunswick.
- Jean George Robichaud b. 1883 first elected in 1922 as Liberal member for Gloucester, New Brunswick.
- Louis-Prudent-Alexandre Robichaud b. 1890 first elected in 1935 as Liberal member for Kent, New Brunswick.
- Ferdinand-Joseph Robidoux b. 1875 first elected in 1911 as Conservative member for Kent, New Brunswick.
- Honoré Robillard b. 1835 first elected in 1887 as Liberal-Conservative member for City of Ottawa, Ontario.
- Lucienne Robillard b. 1945 first elected in 1995 as Liberal member for Saint-Henri—Westmount, Quebec.
- Ulysse Janvier Robillard b. 1826 first elected in 1872 as Independent Conservative member for Beauharnois, Quebec.
- Yves Robillard b. 1942 first elected in 2015 as Liberal member for Marc-Aurèle-Fortin, Quebec.
- Andrew Ernest Robinson b. 1893 first elected in 1945 as Progressive Conservative member for Bruce, Ontario.
- Ernest William Robinson b. 1875 first elected in 1921 as Liberal member for Kings, Nova Scotia.
- Jabel Robinson b. 1831 first elected in 1900 as Independent member for Elgin West, Ontario.
- James Robinson b. 1852 first elected in 1896 as Conservative member for Northumberland, New Brunswick.
- John Beverley Robinson b. 1821 first elected in 1872 as Conservative member for Algoma, Ontario.
- Sidney Cecil Robinson b. 1870 first elected in 1925 as Conservative member for Essex West, Ontario.
- Svend Robinson b. 1952 first elected in 1979 as New Democratic Party member for Burnaby, British Columbia.
- William Alfred Robinson b. 1905 first elected in 1945 as Liberal member for Simcoe East, Ontario.
- William Kenneth Robinson b. 1927 first elected in 1968 as Liberal member for Lakeshore, Ontario.
- Clément Robitaille b. 1873 first elected in 1921 as Liberal member for Maisonneuve, Quebec.
- Jean-Marc Robitaille b. 1955 first elected in 1988 as Progressive Conservative member for Terrebonne, Quebec.
- Lorenzo Robitaille b. 1883 first elected in 1906 as Independent Liberal member for Quebec County, Quebec.
- Théodore Robitaille b. 1834 first elected in 1867 as Conservative member for Bonaventure, Quebec.

== Roc–Roo ==
- Douglas James Roche b. 1929 first elected in 1972 as Progressive Conservative member for Edmonton—Strathcona, Alberta.
- William Roche b. 1842 first elected in 1900 as Liberal member for Halifax, Nova Scotia.
- William James Roche b. 1859 first elected in 1896 as Conservative member for Marquette, Manitoba.
- Joseph Irenée Rochefort b. 1910 first elected in 1949 as Liberal member for Champlain, Quebec.
- Pauline Rochefort first elected in 2025 as Liberal member for Nipissing—Timiskaming, Ontario.
- Gilles Rocheleau b. 1935 first elected in 1988 as Liberal member for Hull—Aylmer, Quebec.
- Yves Rocheleau b. 1944 first elected in 1993 as Bloc Québécois member for Trois-Rivières, Quebec.
- John Rochester b. 1822 first elected in 1872 as Conservative member for Carleton, Ontario.
- Gédéon Rochon b. 1877 first elected in 1915 as Conservative member for Terrebonne, Quebec.
- Jean-Léo Rochon b. 1902 first elected in 1962 as Liberal member for Laval, Quebec.
- Allan Rock b. 1947 first elected in 1993 as Liberal member for Etobicoke Centre, Ontario.
- Raymond Rock b. 1922 first elected in 1962 as Liberal member for Jacques-Cartier—Lasalle, Quebec.
- Thomas George Roddick b. 1846 first elected in 1896 as Conservative member for St. Antoine, Quebec.
- Romuald Rodrigue b. 1929 first elected in 1968 as Ralliement Créditiste member for Beauce, Quebec.
- John Rodriguez b. 1937 first elected in 1972 as New Democratic Party member for Nickel Belt, Ontario.
- Pablo Rodriguez b. 1967 first elected in 2004 as Liberal member for Honoré-Mercier, Quebec.
- Arthur Roebuck b. 1878 first elected in 1940 as Liberal member for Trinity, Ontario.
- Alexander Rogers b. 1842 first elected in 1878 as Liberal member for Albert, New Brunswick.
- Churence Rogers b. 1953 first elected in 2017 as Liberal member for Bonavista—Burin—Trinity, Newfoundland and Labrador.
- David Dickson Rogers b. 1845 first elected in 1896 as Patrons of Industry member for Frontenac, Ontario.
- Harris George Rogers b. 1891 first elected in 1958 as Progressive Conservative member for Red Deer, Alberta.
- Norman McLeod Rogers b. 1894 first elected in 1935 as Liberal member for Kingston City, Ontario.
- Robert Rogers b. 1864 first elected in 1911 as Conservative member for Winnipeg, Manitoba.
- Anthony Roman b. 1936 first elected in 1984 with no affiliation as the member for York North, Ontario.
- Sherry Romanado b. 1974 first elected in 2015 as Liberal member for Longueuil—Charles-LeMoyne, Quebec.
- Bill Rompkey b. 1936 first elected in 1972 as Liberal member for Grand Falls—White Bay—Labrador, Newfoundland and Labrador.
- Aristide Stanislas Joseph Rompré b. 1912 first elected in 1958 as Progressive Conservative member for Portneuf, Quebec.
- Gilbert F. Rondeau b. 1928 first elected in 1962 as Social Credit member for Shefford, Quebec.
- Lianne Rood b. 1979 first elected in 2019 as Conservative member for Lambton—Kent—Middlesex, Ontario.
- William Frederick Roome b. 1841 first elected in 1887 as Conservative member for Middlesex West, Ontario.
- James Rooney b. 1897 first elected in 1949 as Liberal member for St. Paul's, Ontario.
- Dave Rooney b. 1937 first elected in 1972 as Liberal member for Bonavista—Trinity—Conception, Newfoundland and Labrador.

== Ros ==
- Bennett Rosamond b. 1833 first elected in 1891 as Conservative member for Lanark North, Ontario.
- Francis James Roscoe b. 1831 first elected in 1874 as Independent Liberal member for Victoria, British Columbia.
- Fred Rose b. 1907 first elected in 1943 as Labor Progressive member for Cartier, Quebec.
- John Rose b. 1820 first elected in 1867 as Liberal-Conservative member for Huntingdon, Quebec.
- Mark Rose b. 1924 first elected in 1968 as New Democratic Party member for Fraser Valley West, British Columbia.
- Alexander Charles Ross b. 1847 first elected in 1906 as Liberal member for North Cape Breton and Victoria, Nova Scotia.
- Arthur Edward Ross b. 1870 first elected in 1921 as Conservative member for Kingston, Ontario.
- Arthur Wellington Ross b. 1846 first elected in 1882 as Liberal-Conservative member for Lisgar, Manitoba.
- Douglas Ross b. 1883 first elected in 1935 as Conservative member for St. Paul's, Ontario.
- Duncan Ross b. 1870 first elected in 1904 as Liberal member for Yale—Cariboo, British Columbia.
- Duncan Campbell Ross b. 1871 first elected in 1909 as Liberal member for Middlesex West, Ontario.
- Duncan Graham Ross b. 1891 first elected in 1935 as Liberal member for Middlesex East, Ontario.
- Ellis Ross b. 1965 first elected in 2025 as Conservative member for Skeena—Bulkley Valley, British Columbia.
- George Henry Ross b. 1878 first elected in 1940 as Liberal member for Calgary East, Alberta.
- George William Ross b. 1841 first elected in 1872 as Liberal member for Middlesex West, Ontario.
- Hugo Homer Ross b. 1847 first elected in 1891 as Conservative member for Dundas, Ontario.
- James Ross b. 1817 first elected in 1869 as Liberal member for Wellington Centre, Ontario.
- James Arthur Ross b. 1893 first elected in 1940 as National Government member for Souris, Manitoba.
- James Hamilton Ross b. 1856 first elected in 1902 as Liberal member for Yukon, Yukon.
- Jean Auguste Ross b. 1851 first elected in 1897 as Liberal member for Rimouski, Quebec.
- John Gordon Ross b. 1891 first elected in 1925 as Liberal member for Moose Jaw, Saskatchewan.
- John Jones Ross b. 1831 first elected in 1867 as Conservative member for Champlain, Quebec.
- John Sylvester Ross b. 1821 first elected in 1867 as Liberal-Conservative member for Dundas, Ontario.
- Lewis Ross b. 1825 first elected in 1872 as Liberal member for Durham East, Ontario.
- Thomas Edwin Ross b. 1873 first elected in 1921 as Progressive member for Simcoe North, Ontario.
- Thomas Hambly Ross b. 1886 first elected in 1940 as Liberal member for Hamilton East, Ontario.
- Walter Ross b. 1817 first elected in 1867 as Liberal member for Prince Edward, Ontario.
- William Ross b. 1824 first elected in 1867 as Anti-Confederate member for Victoria, Nova Scotia.
- William Ross b. 1854 first elected in 1900 as Liberal member for Ontario South, Ontario.
- Carlo Rossi b. 1925 first elected in 1979 as Liberal member for Bourassa, Quebec.

== Rot–Roy ==
- Anthony Rota b. 1961 first elected in 2004 as Liberal member for Nipissing—Timiskaming, Ontario.
- François Fortunat Rouleau b. 1849 first elected in 1874 as Liberal-Conservative member for Dorchester, Quebec.
- Guy Rouleau b. 1923 first elected in 1953 as Liberal member for Dollard, Quebec.
- Jean Rousseau b. 1961 first elected in 2011 as New Democratic Party member for Compton—Stanstead, Quebec.
- Jeffrey Alexandre Rousseau b. 1852 first elected in 1900 as Liberal member for Champlain, Quebec.
- Joseph Hervé Rousseau b. 1877 first elected in 1950 as Independent Liberal member for Rimouski, Quebec.
- Félix Routhier b. 1827 first elected in 1878 as Conservative member for Prescott, Ontario.
- James Rowand b. 1830 first elected in 1887 as Liberal member for Bruce West, Ontario.
- Jonathan Rowe first elected in 2025 as Conservative member for Terra Nova—The Peninsulas, Newfoundland and Labrador.
- Percy John Rowe b. 1893 first elected in 1935 as Social Credit member for Athabaska, Alberta.
- William Earl Rowe b. 1894 first elected in 1925 as Conservative member for Dufferin—Simcoe, Ontario.
- Newton Rowell b. 1867 first elected in 1917 as Unionist member for Durham, Ontario.
- Doug Rowland b. 1940 first elected in 1970 as New Democratic Party member for Selkirk, Manitoba.
- Jack Roxburgh b. 1901 first elected in 1962 as Liberal member for Norfolk, Ontario.
- Charles François Roy b. 1835 first elected in 1877 as Conservative member for Kamouraska, Quebec.
- Cyrias Roy b. 1864 first elected in 1908 as Liberal member for Montmagny, Quebec.
- Fabien Roy b. 1928 first elected in 1979 as Social Credit member for Beauce, Quebec.
- Gustave Roy b. 1907 first elected in 1953 as Liberal member for Labelle, Quebec.
- J.-Aurélien Roy b. 1910 first elected in 1962 as Social Credit member for Lévis,[Quebec.
- Jean Robert Roy b. 1923 first elected in 1968 as Liberal member for Timmins, Ontario.
- Jean-Yves Roy b. 1949 first elected in 2000 as Bloc Québécois member for Matapédia—Matane, Quebec.
- Joseph Alfred Ernest Roy b. 1871 first elected in 1908 as Liberal member for Dorchester, Quebec.
- Joseph Sasseville Roy b. 1895 first elected in 1940 as Independent Conservative member for Gaspé, Quebec.
- Marcel-Claude Roy b. 1936 first elected in 1968 as Liberal member for Laval, Quebec.
- Nicole Roy-Arcelin b. 1941 first elected in 1988 as Progressive Conservative member for Ahuntsic, Quebec.
- Joseph Royal b. 1837 first elected in 1879 as Conservative member for Provencher, Manitoba.
- Zoe Royer first elected in 2025 as Liberal member for Port Moody—Coquitlam, British Columbia.

== Ru ==
- Kim Rudd b. 1957 first elected in 2015 as Liberal member for Northumberland—Peterborough South, Ontario.
- Alex Ruff b. 1974 first elected in 2019 as Conservative member for Bruce—Grey—Owen Sound, Ontario.
- Dan Ruimy b. 1962 first elected in 2015 as Liberal member for Pitt Meadows—Maple Ridge, British Columbia.
- Don Rusnak b. 1975 first elected in 2015 as Liberal member for Thunder Bay—Rainy River, Ontario.
- Benjamin Russell b. 1849 first elected in 1896 as Liberal member for Halifax, Nova Scotia.
- Joseph Russell b. 1868 first elected in 1908 as Independent member for Toronto East, Ontario.
- Todd Russell b. 1966 first elected in 2005 as Liberal member for Labrador, Newfoundland and Labrador.
- William Windfield Rutan b. 1865 first elected in 1908 as Liberal member for Prince Albert, Saskatchewan.
- James Warren Rutherford b. 1875 first elected in 1926 as Liberal member for Kent, Ontario.
- John Gunion Rutherford b. 1857 first elected in 1897 as Liberal member for Macdonald, Manitoba.

== Ry ==
- George Ryan b. 1806 first elected in 1867 as Liberal member for King's, New Brunswick.
- Joseph O'Connell Ryan b. 1841 first elected in 1874 as Liberal member for Marquette, Manitoba.
- Michael Patrick Ryan b. 1825 first elected in 1868 as Liberal-Conservative member for Montreal West, Quebec.
- Robert Ryan b. 1878 first elected in 1940 as Liberal member for Three Rivers, Quebec.
- Perry Ryan b. 1918 first elected in 1962 as Liberal member for Spadina, Ontario.
- William Michael Ryan b. 1887 first elected in 1935 as Liberal member for St. John—Albert, New Brunswick.
- Edmond Baird Ryckman b. 1866 first elected in 1921 as Conservative member for Toronto East, Ontario.
- Samuel Shobal Ryckman b. 1849 first elected in 1891 as Conservative member for Hamilton, Ontario.
- Robert Edwy Ryerson b. 1865 first elected in 1925 as Conservative member for Brantford City, Ontario.
- John Charles Rykert b. 1832 first elected in 1878 as Conservative member for Lincoln, Ontario.
- Joseph Rymal b. 1821 first elected in 1867 as Liberal member for Wentworth South, Ontario.
- Philip Bernard Rynard b. 1897 first elected in 1957 as Progressive Conservative member for Simcoe East, Ontario.
