= Great Canadian flag debate =

Debate in Canada from 1963 to 1964 over the design of a new national flag

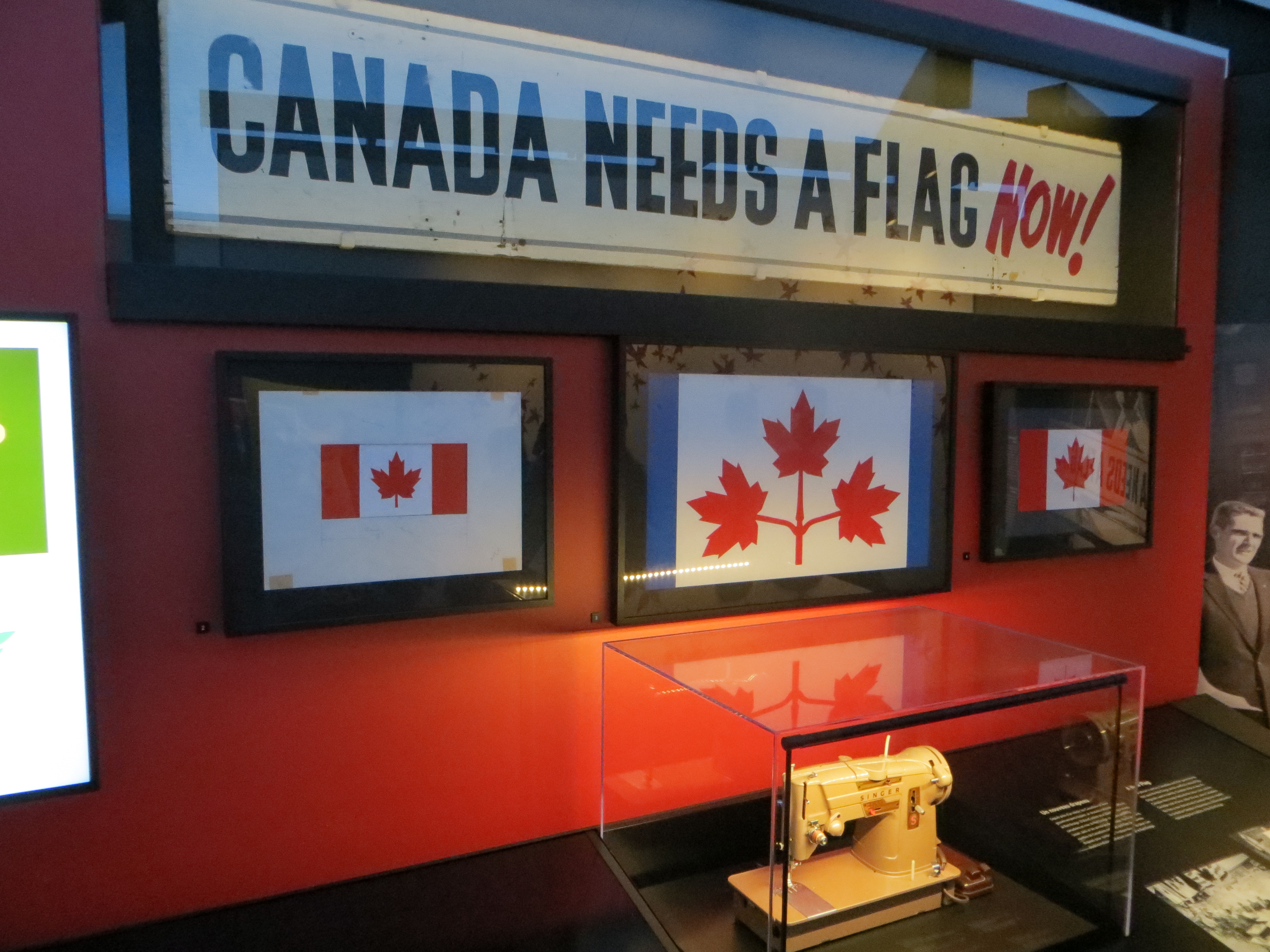
An exhibit on the Great Canadian Flag Debate at the Canadian Museum of History

The Great Canadian flag debate (or Great Flag Debate) was a national debate that took place in 1963 and 1964 when a new design for the national flag of Canada was chosen.

Although the flag debate had been ongoing for a long time prior, it officially began on June 15, 1964, when Prime Minister Lester B. Pearson proposed his plans for a new flag in the House of Commons. The debate lasted more than six months, and bitterly divided politicians and the general public over the design of a new Canadian flag. The debate over the proposed new Canadian flag was ended by closure on December 15, 1964. It resulted in the adoption of the "Maple Leaf" as the Canadian national flag, which remains the official national flag of Canada.

The flag was inaugurated on February 15, 1965, a date that has been commemorated as National Flag of Canada Day since 1996.

== Background ==
=== Union Jack and Red Ensign ===
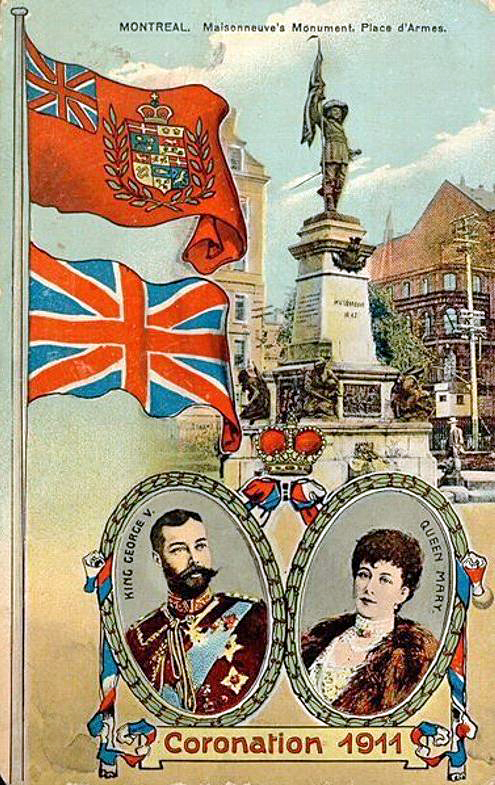
A postcard for the 1911 coronation of George V, with the Canadian Red Ensign and the Union Jack.

The Union Jack served as the formal flag for various colonies in British North America, and remained as the formal national flag of Canada from Confederation to 1965. However, from the late 19th century to 1965, the civil ensign, the Canadian Red Ensign, was also used as an unofficial national flag and symbol for Canada.

The first Canadian Red Ensigns were used in Prime Minister Sir John A. Macdonald's time. The Governor General at the time of Macdonald's death, Lord Stanley, wrote to London in 1891:

... the Dominion Government has encouraged by precept and example the use on all public buildings throughout the provinces of the Red Ensign with the Canadian badge on the fly... [which] has come to be considered as the recognized flag of the Dominion, both ashore and afloat.

Under pressure from pro-imperial public opinion, Prime Minister Sir Wilfrid Laurier raised the Union Jack over the Parliament buildings' Victoria Tower, where it remained until the re-emergence of the Red Ensign in the 1920s.

William Lyon Mackenzie King tried to adopt a new national flag in 1925 and 1946, having received a recommendation that came back as a Red Ensign design that replaced the coat of arms with a gold maple leaf in 1946. However, ongoing fears that the change might lead to political instability resulted in Mackenzie King shelving the project. A compromise was reached where the government would fly the Canadian Red Ensign as a "distinctive Canadian flag" on government buildings, but maintain the Union Jack as the national flag.

In 1958, an extensive poll was taken of the attitudes that adult Canadians held toward the flag. Of those who expressed opinions, over 80 per cent wanted a national flag entirely different from that of any other nation, and 60 per cent wanted their flag to bear the maple leaf. In April 1963, an opinion poll of 2,262 Canadians found that 52% supported a new national flag for Canada of its own, while 30% preferred using the Union Jack and 18% preferred using the Canadian Red Ensign. There was sharp division, however, between linguistic groups in their preferences. Whereas 90% of Francophones preferred a new national flag, only 35% of Anglophones desired this. Combined, the Union Jack and Red Ensign commanded the support of 65% of English Canadians.

=== Lester B. Pearson ===
Pearson's preferred choice for a new flag was nicknamed the "Pearson Pennant".

From his office as leader of the opposition, Lester Pearson issued a press release on January 27, 1960, in which he summarized the problem and presented his suggestion as:

... Canadian Government taking full responsibility as soon as possible for finding a solution to the flag problem, by submitting to Parliament a measure which, if accepted by the representatives of the people in Parliament, would, I hope, settle the problem.

The Progressive Conservative government of the time, headed by Prime Minister John Diefenbaker, did not accept the invitation to establish a new Canadian flag. As a result, Pearson made it Liberal Party policy in 1961, and part of the party's election platform in the 1962 and 1963 federal elections. During the election campaign of 1963, Pearson promised that Canada would have a new flag within two years of his election. No previous party leader had ever gone as far as Pearson did - putting a time limit on finding a new national flag. The 1963 election brought the Liberals back to power, but with a minority government. Pearson had been a significant broker during the Suez Crisis of 1956, for which he was awarded the Nobel Peace Prize. During the crisis, Pearson was disturbed when the Egyptian government objected to Canadian peacekeeping forces because the Canadian flag (the Red Ensign) contained the same symbol (the Union Flag) used as a flag by the United Kingdom, one of the belligerents. Pearson's goal was to create a flag that was distinctive and unmistakably Canadian. The main opponent to changing the flag was the leader of the opposition and former prime minister, John Diefenbaker, who eventually made the subject a personal crusade.

In February 1964, a design with three red leaves and two blue edge borders was leaked to the press. At the 20th Royal Canadian Legion Convention in Winnipeg on May 17, 1964, Pearson faced an unsympathetic audience of Legionnaires and told them that the time had come to replace the Canadian Red Ensign with a distinctive maple leaf flag. The Royal Canadian Legion and the Canadian Corps Association wanted the new flag to include the Union Jack as a sign of ties to the United Kingdom and to other Commonwealth countries, such as Australia and New Zealand, that use the Union Jack in the quarter of their national flag.

Lester Pearson's preferred choice for a new flag was nicknamed the "Pearson Pennant". Pearson's first design featured the three maple leaves on a white background, with vertical blue bars to either side. Pearson preferred this choice, as the blue bars reflected Canada's motto, "from sea to sea".

== Parliamentary debate begins ==
Flag promoted by the Native Sons of Canada.

"Group B" finalist considered by Parliamentary committee

"Group C" finalist considered by Parliamentary committee

Proposed flags

=== Opening resolution ===
On June 15, 1964, Pearson opened the parliamentary flag debate with a resolution:

… to establish officially as the flag of Canada a flag embodying the emblem proclaimed by His Majesty King George V on November 21, 1921 — three maple leaves conjoined on one stem — in the colours red and white then designated for Canada, the red leaves occupying a field of white between vertical sections of blue on the edges of the flag.

The flag proposed by Pearson, referred to as "the Pearson Pennant", was designed by Alan Beddoe. Pearson sought to produce a flag which embodied history and tradition, but he also wanted to excise the Union Jack as a reminder of Canada's heritage and links to the United Kingdom. Hence, the issue was not whether the maple leaf was pre-eminently Canadian, but rather whether the nation should exclude the British-related component from its identity.

=== Diefenbaker opposition ===
Diefenbaker led the opposition to the Maple Leaf flag, arguing for the retention of the Canadian Red Ensign. Diefenbaker and his lieutenants mounted a filibuster. The seemingly endless debate raged on in Parliament and the press with no side giving quarter. Pearson forced members of Parliament to stay over the summer, but that did not help.

On September 10, 1964, the Prime Minister yielded to the suggestion that the matter be referred to a special flag committee. The key member of the 15-person panel, Liberal Member of Parliament John Matheson, said that they "were asked to produce a flag for Canada and in six weeks!"

== Special flag committee ==
Flag of the Royal Military College of Canada which inspired Stanley's design

On September 10, 1964, a committee of 15 Members of Parliament was announced. It was made up of seven Liberals, five Conservatives (PC) and one each from the New Democratic Party (NDP), the Social Credit Party and the Ralliement créditiste.

The Committee members were as follows:

Member	Party	Electoral district
Herman Maxwell Batten (chairman)	Liberal	Humber—St. George's, Newfoundland
Léo Cadieux	Liberal	Terrebonne, Quebec
Grant Deachman	Liberal	Vancouver Quadra, British Columbia
Jean-Eudes Dubé	Liberal	Restigouche—Madawaska, New Brunswick
Hugh John Flemming	PC	Victoria—Carleton, New Brunswick
Margaret Konantz	Liberal	Winnipeg South, Manitoba
Raymond Langlois	Ralliement créditiste	Mégantic, Quebec
Marcel Lessard	Social Credit	Lac-Saint-Jean, Quebec
Joseph Macaluso	Liberal	Hamilton West, Ontario
John Matheson	Liberal	Leeds, Ontario
Jay Monteith	PC	Perth, Ontario
David Vaughan Pugh	PC	Okanagan Boundary, British Columbia
Reynold Rapp	PC	Humboldt—Melfort—Tisdale, Saskatchewan
Théogène Ricard	PC	Saint-Hyacinthe—Bagot, Quebec
Reid Scott	NDP	Danforth, Ontario

The Conservatives at first saw this event as a victory, for they knew that all previous flag committees had suffered miscarriages. During the next six weeks the committee held 35 lengthy meetings. Thousands of suggestions also poured in from a public engaged in what had become a great Canadian debate about identity and how best to represent it.

3,541 entries were submitted: many contained common elements:

- 2,136 contained maple leaves
- 408 contained Union Jacks
- 389 contained beavers
- 359 contained Fleurs-de-lys

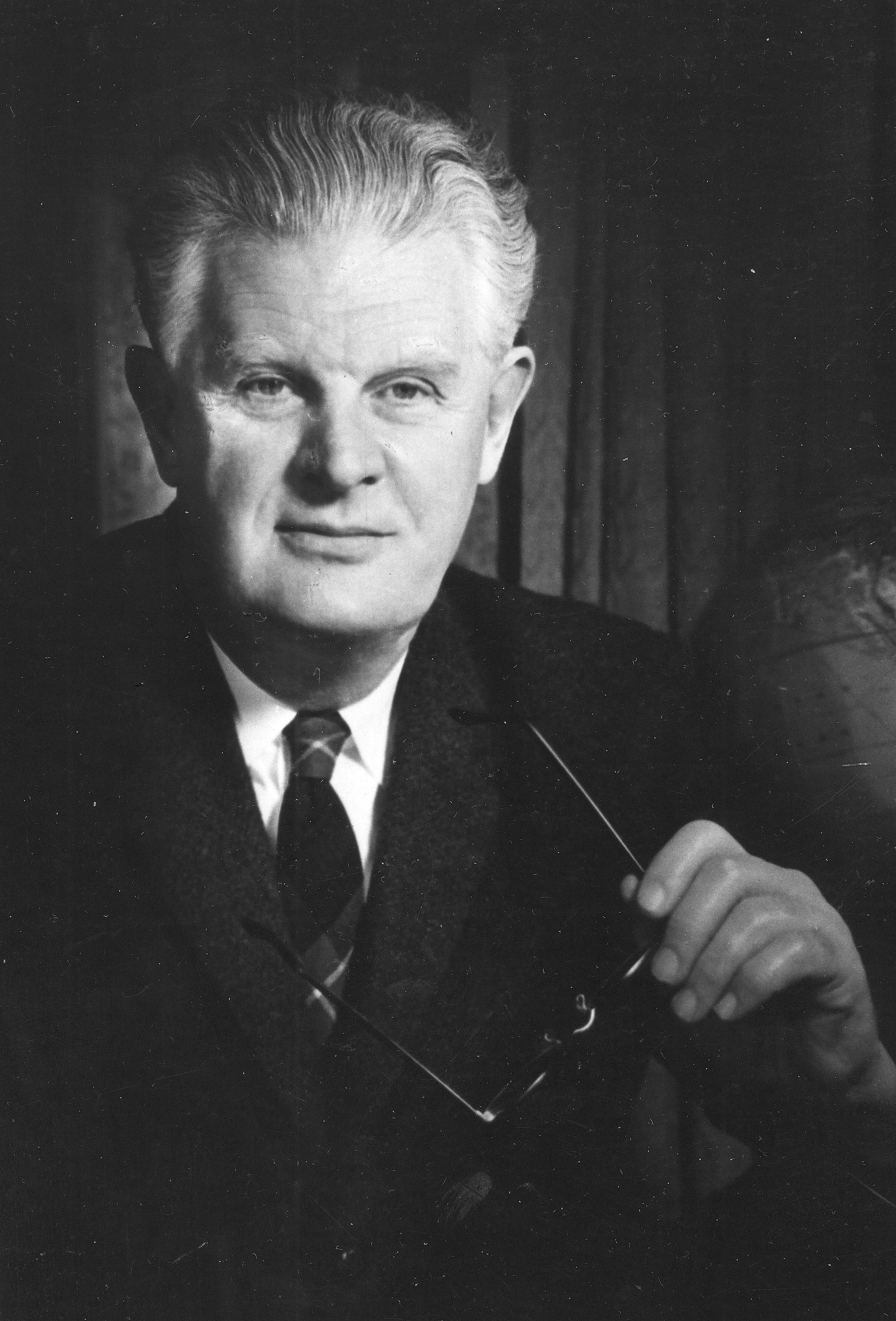
George Stanley who designed the flag eventually adopted

At the last minute, John Matheson slipped a flag designed by historian George Stanley into the mix. The idea came to him while standing in front of the Mackenzie Building of the Royal Military College of Canada, while viewing the college flag flying in the wind. Stanley submitted a March 23, 1964 formal detailed memorandum to Matheson on the history of Canada's emblems, predating Pearson's raising the issue, in which he warned that any new flag "must avoid the use of national or racial symbols that are of a divisive nature" and that it would be "clearly inadvisable" to create a flag that carried either a Union Jack or a Fleur-de-lis. The design put forward had a single red maple leaf on a white plain background, flanked by two red borders, based on the design of the flag of the Royal Military College. The voting was held on October 22, 1964, when the committee's final contest pitted Pearson's pennant against Stanley's. Assuming that the Liberals would vote for the Prime Minister's design, the Conservatives backed Stanley. They were outmaneuvered by the Liberals who had agreed with others to choose the Stanley Maple Leaf flag. The Liberals voted for the red and white flag, making the selection unanimous (14–0 with the committee chairman not voting).

== Parliamentary vote ==
While the committee had made its decision, the House of Commons had not. Diefenbaker would not budge, so the debate continued for six weeks as the Conservatives launched a filibuster. The debate had become so ugly that the Toronto Star called it "The Great Flag Farce."

The debate was prolonged until one of Diefenbaker's own senior members, Léon Balcer, and the Créditiste, Réal Caouette, advised the government to cut off debate by applying closure. Pearson did so, and after some 250 speeches, the final vote adopting the Stanley flag took place at 2:15 on the morning of December 15, 1964, with Balcer and the other francophone Conservatives swinging behind the Liberals. The committee's recommendation was accepted 163 to 78. At 2:00 AM, immediately after the successful vote, Matheson wrote to Stanley: "Your proposed flag has just now been approved by the Commons 163 to 78. Congratulations. I believe it is an excellent flag that will serve Canada well." Diefenbaker, however, called it "a flag by closure, imposed by closure."

On the afternoon of December 15, the Commons also voted in favour of continued use of the Union Flag as an official flag to symbolize Canada's allegiance to the Crown and its membership in the Commonwealth of Nations. Senate approval followed on December 17, 1964. The Union Jack, or the "Royal Union Flag", as it would be officially termed in the parliamentary resolution, would be put alongside the new flag at federal government buildings, federally-operated airports, military installations, at the masthead of Royal Canadian Navy ships within Canadian waters, and at other appropriate establishments on Commonwealth Day, Victoria Day (the monarch's official birthday in Canada), 11 December (the anniversary of the enactment of the Statute of Westminster 1931), and when otherwise instructed to do so by the National Defence Headquarters.

== Aftermath ==
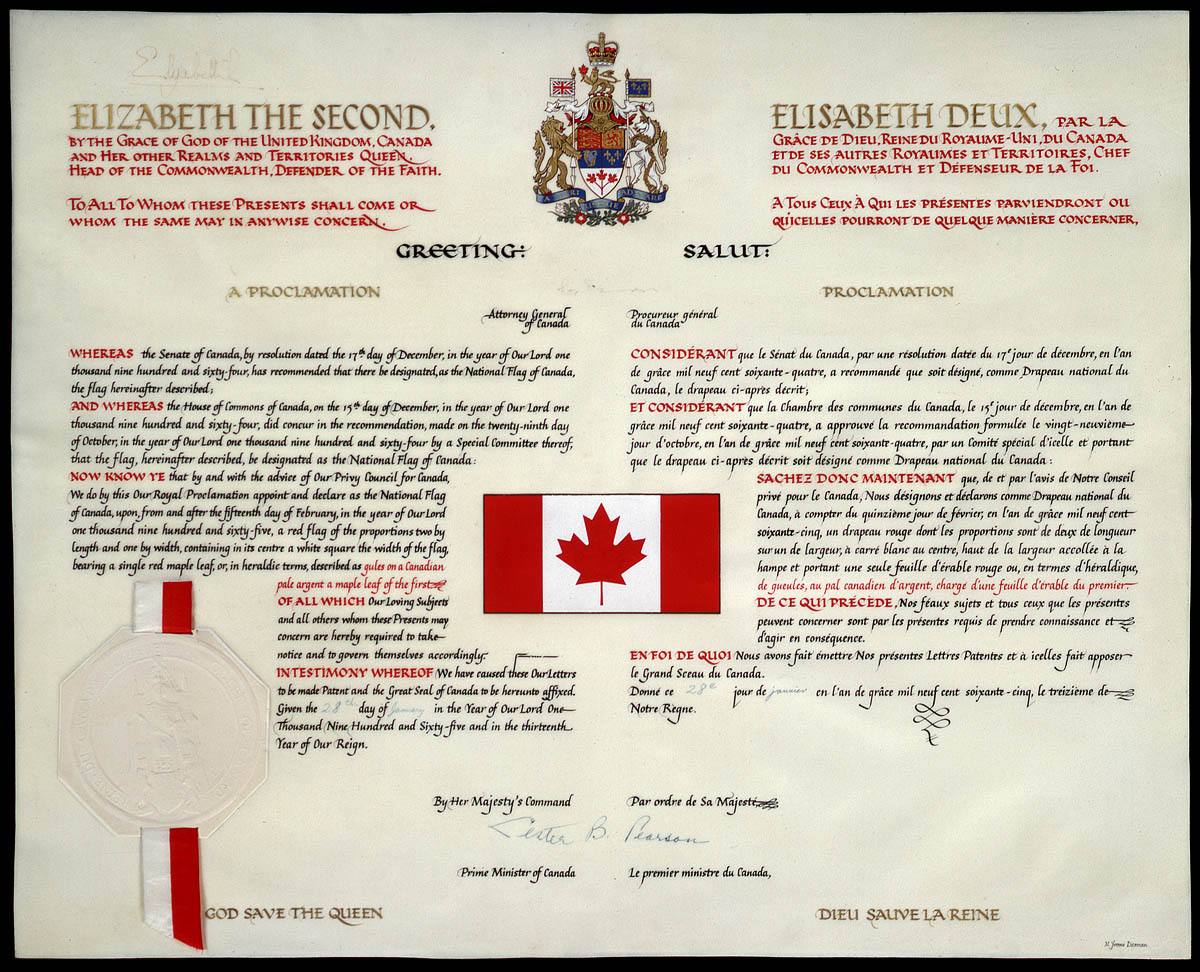
The royal proclamation naming the Maple Leaf the country's new national flag.

The flag was inaugurated on February 15, 1965, at an official ceremony held on Parliament Hill in Ottawa in the presence of Governor General Major-General Georges Vanier, the prime minister, the members of the Cabinet, and Canadian parliamentarians. Also throughout Canada, at the United Nations in New York City, and at Canadian legations and on Canadian ships throughout the world, the Canadian Red Ensign was lowered and the Maple Leaf flag was raised. As journalist George Bain wrote of the occasion, the flag "looked bold and clean, and distinctively our own."

=== Provincial flags ===
After the debate, Manitoba and Ontario adopted versions of the Red Ensign as basis for their provincial flags.

The Canadian Red Ensign itself can sometimes be seen today in Canada, often in connection to veterans' associations.

On the other hand, Newfoundland used the Union Jack as its provincial flag from 1952 until 1980; the blue triangles on the new flag adopted in 1980 are meant as a tribute to the Union Jack. British Columbia's flag, which features the Union Jack in its top portion, was introduced in 1960 and is actually based on the shield of the provincial coat of arms, which dates back to 1906.

== See also ==
- History of Canada
- Australian flag debate
- New Zealand flag debate
- Northern Ireland flags issue

== Bibliography ==
- Albinski, Henry S. (August 1967). "Politics and Biculturalism in Canada: The Flag Debate*". Australian Journal of Politics & History. 13 (2): 169–188. doi:10.1111/j.1467-8497.1967.tb00800.x.
- Band, C.P. & Stovel, E.L. (1925) Our Flag: A Concise Illustrated History. Toronto, ON: Musson Book Co.
- Canada House of Commons. (1964) December 14, 1964 Session. Debates. 11075–11086.
  - Pearson's speech of June 15, 1964 can be found in its entirety in the Canada: House of Commons Debates, IV (1964), pp. 4306–4309, 4319–4326
- Champion, C. P. (2006). "A Very British Coup: Canadianism, Quebec, and Ethnicity in the Flag Debate, 1964-1965". Journal of Canadian Studies. 40 (3): 68–99. doi:10.3138/jcs.40.3.68. ISSN 0021-9495. S2CID 142885623.
- Champion, C. P. (2010). The Strange Demise of British Canada The Liberals and Canadian Nationalism, 1964-68. McGill-Queen's University Press. ISBN 978-0-7735-9105-9.
- Diefenbaker, John G. (1977). The Tumultuous Years 1962–1967. One Canada: Memoirs of the Right Honourable John G. Diefenbaker. Toronto: Macmillan of Canada. ISBN 978-0-7705-1569-0.
- Fraser, Alistair B. (1991). "A Canadian Flag for Canada". Journal of Canadian Studies. 25 (4): 64–80. doi:10.3138/jcs.25.4.64. ISSN 0021-9495. S2CID 151423158.
- Fraser, A.B. "The Flags of Canada". http://fraser.cc/FlagsCan/index.html
- Granatstein, J. L. (1986). Canada 1957–1967: the Years of Uncertainty and Innovation. Toronto: McClelland and Stewart. ISBN 978-0-7710-3515-9.
- Kelly, K. (1964) "Closure Day in Parliament: Flag debate may die in Commons, revive in Senate". Chronicle Herald Dec. 15, 1964. 1, 6.
- Matheson, John Ross (1986). "Lester Pearson and the flag, 1960–1964". Canada's flag: A Search for a Country. Belleville, Ont.: Mika. ISBN 978-0-919303-01-0.
- Stanley, G.F.G. (1965) The Story of Canada's Flag: A Historical Sketch. Toronto: Ryerson Press.
- Flag Debate in The Canadian Encyclopedia
- The Flags of Canada, by Alistair B. Fraser.
- Canada, flag proposals
- Stanley, G. F. G. (March 23, 1964), Memo to John Matheson, archived from the original on March 9, 2014 - Dr. George F.G. Stanley's Flag Memorandum
