= List of members of the Canadian House of Commons with military service (R) =

Name	Elected party	Constituency	Elected date	Military service
Samuel Victor Railton	Liberal	Welland	October 30, 1972	Canadian Army (1940-1945)
James Layton Ralston	Liberal	Shelburne—Yarmouth	November 2, 1926	Canadian Army (1916-)
James Palmer Rankin	Liberal	Perth North	October 26, 1908	Canadian Army
Donald Paul Ravis	Progressive Conservative	Saskatoon East	September 4, 1984	Royal Canadian Navy (1960-1968), Canadian Forces Maritime Command (1968-1984)
William Hallett Ray	Anti-Confederate	Annapolis	September 20, 1920	Militia
Daniel Lee Redman	Unionist	East Calgary	December 17, 1917	Canadian Army (1914-1918)(1940-1946)
Joseph Lloyd Reid	Progressive Conservative	St. Catharines	May 22, 1979	Canadian Army
George Septimus Rennie	Conservative	Hamilton East	September 14, 1926	Canadian Army (1914-1923)
Charles Richard	Progressive Conservative	Kamouraska	March 31, 1958	Canadian Army (1939-1945)
Clovis-Thomas Richard	Liberal	Gloucester	June 11, 1945	Canadian Army
James Armstrong Richardson	Liberal	Winnipeg South	June 25, 1968	Royal Canadian Air Force (1943-)
John Richardson	Liberal	Perth—Wellington—Waterloo	October 25, 1993	Canadian Army (1952-1960), Canadian Forces Land Force Command (1982-1992)
Bob Ringma	Reform	Nanaimo—Cowichan	October 25, 1993	Canadian Army (1949-1968), Canadian Forces Land Force Command (1968-1983)
Gabriel Roberge	Liberal	Mégantic	March 31, 1958	Canadian Army (1943-1946)
Louis-Édouard Roberge	Liberal	Stanstead	June 27, 1949	Canadian Army
Frederick Greystock Robertson	Liberal	Northumberland	June 27, 1949	Canadian Army
Andrew Ernest Robinson	Progressive Conservative	Bruce	June 11, 1945	Canadian Army (1914-1919)
Sidney Cecil Robinson	Conservative	Essex West	October 29, 1925	Canadian Army
William Kenneth Robinson	Liberal	Lakeshore	June 25, 1968	Canadian Army, Royal Canadian Air Force
Raymond Rock	Liberal	Jacques-Cartier—Lasalle	June 18, 1962	Royal Canadian Navy (1942-1945)
Thomas George Roddick	Conservative	St. Antoine	June 23, 1896	Militia
Harris George Rogers	Progressive Conservative	Red Deer	March 31, 1958	Canadian Army
Norman McLeod Rogers	Liberal	Kingston City	October 14, 1935	Canadian Army (1916-1917)
William H. Rompkey	Liberal	Grand Falls—White Bay—Labrador	October 30, 1972	Royal Canadian Navy (1955-1963)
Arthur Edward Ross	Conservative	Kingston	December 6, 1921	Militia (1899-1902), Canadian Army (1914-1918)
Duncan Graham Ross	Liberal	Middlesex East	October 14, 1935	Canadian Army (1926-1931)
James Arthur Ross	National Government	Souris	March 26, 1940	Canadian Army
John Jones Ross	Conservative	Champlain	September 20, 1867	Militia
Walter Ross	Liberal	Prince Edward	September 20, 1867	Militia (1863-1883)
William Ross	Anti-Confederate	Victoria	September 20, 1867	Militia
Jeffrey Alexandre Rousseau	Liberal	Champlain	November 7, 1900	Militia (1882-1908)
Félix Routhier	Conservative	Prescott	September 17, 1878	Militia (1882-1892)
Percy John Rowe	Social Credit	Athabaska	October 14, 1935	Canadian Army (1916-1919)
Doug Rowland	New Democratic	Selkirk	April 13, 1970	Royal Canadian Navy (1958-1969), Canadian Forces Maritime Command (1968-1973)
John Gunion Rutherford	Liberal	Macdonald	April 27, 1897	Militia (1885)
