= Roberge =

The name Roberge is an Old French reference to the longships (Viking ships) the Norsemen used, and the name is associated with seafarers and travelers. The name originated in the Normandy region of France, but is more common today in Quebec, Canada.

== Motto ==
Fayce que devras

== People with the surname Roberge ==
- Bert Roberge (born 1954), former Major League Baseball pitcher
- Catherine Roberge (born 1982), Canadian judoka
- Dick Roberge (born 1934), retired Canadian professional ice hockey forward and coach
- Eusèbe Roberge (1874–1957), Canadian politician
- Fernand Roberge (born 1935), Canadian engineer, teacher and researcher
- François Roberge (born 1968), Canadian curler
- François-Olivier Roberge (born 1985), Canadian speed-skater
- Gabriel Roberge (1918-2006), Canadian lawyer and politician
- Giana Roberge (born 1970), American female road cycle racer and team director
- Guy Roberge (1915–1991), Canadian journalist, lawyer, politician, civil servant and the first Commissioner of the National Film Board of Canada
- Jean-François Morin-Roberge (born 1984), former offensive lineman in the Canadian Football League
- Jean-François Roberge, Canadian politician, Quebec's Minister of Education
- Kalyna Roberge (born 1986), Canadian short track speed skater
- Louis-Édouard Roberge (1896–1982), Canadian merchant and politician
- Mario Roberge (born 1964), retired Canadian ice hockey forward
- Rob Roberge, American writer, guitarist, singer, and academic
- Skippy Roberge (1917–1993), American professional baseball player
- Sean Roberge (1972–1996), Canadian actor
- Serge Roberge (born 1965), professional ice hockey player
- Sheila Roberge, American politician
- Sophie Roberge (born 1973), Canadian former judoka
- Valentin Roberge (born 1987), French professional footballer

== Lakes ==
- Lake Roberge (Grandes-Piles), located in Middle-Mauricie, Quebec, Canada
- Lake Roberge (Lac-Masketsi), Lac-Masketsi (Unorganized territory), Mekinac Regional County Municipality, Quebec, Canada
