= George Stanley =

Designer of the Canadian flag (1907–2002)

Lieutenant-Colonel the Honourable George F. G. Stanley CC CD FRSC FRHSC(hon) FRHistS
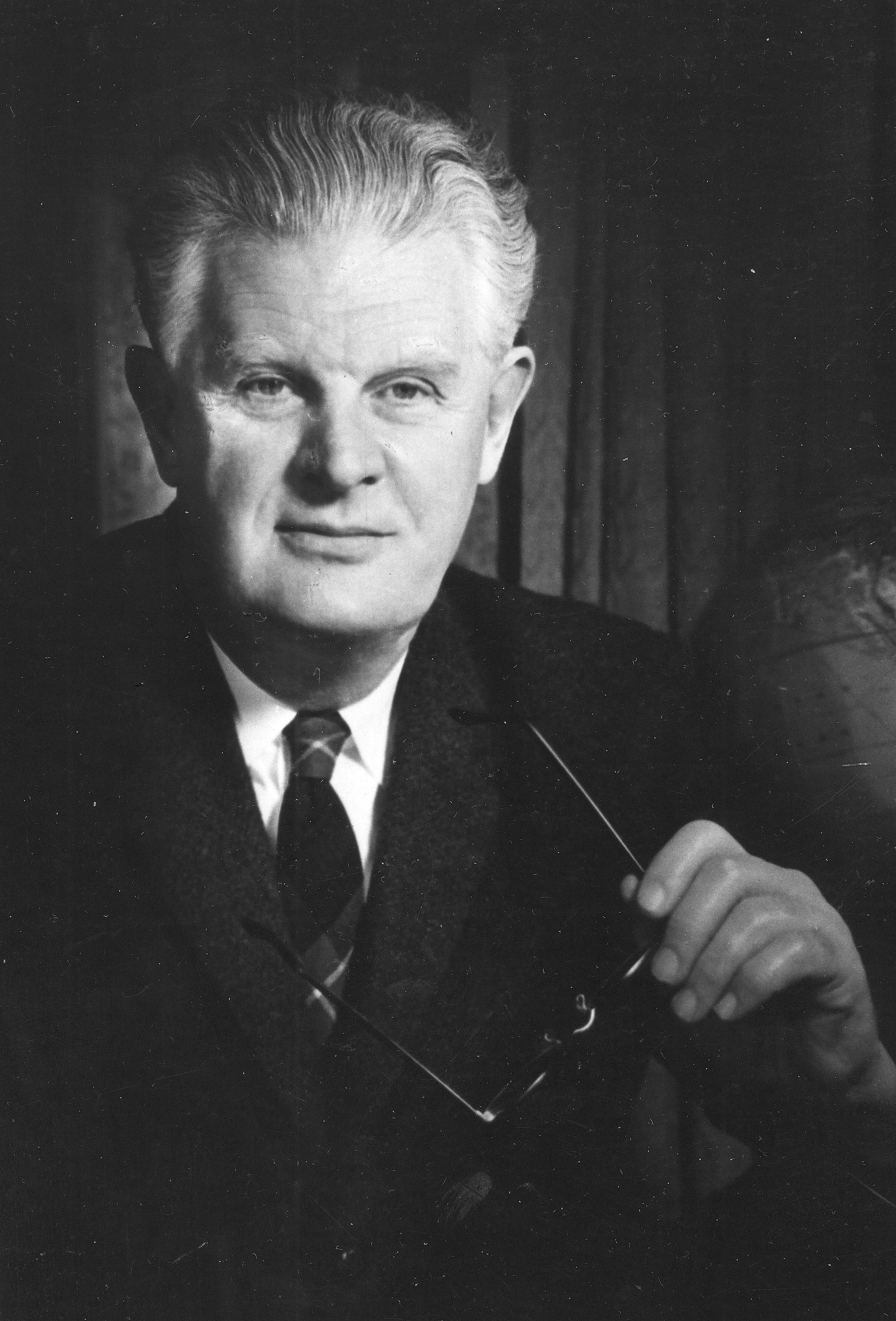
- George Stanley in the 1960s.
- Born: George Francis Gillman Stanley; July 6, 1907; Calgary, Alberta, Canada
- Died: September 13, 2002 (aged 95) Sackville, New Brunswick, Canada
- Buried: Sackville Cemetery
- Allegiance: Canada
- Awards: CC, CD, KStJ, DPhil, DLitt, FRSC, FRHistS, FRHSC (hon.)
- Education: University of Oxford
- Spouse: Ruth Stanley
- Other work: historian, author, soldier, teacher, public servant

25th Lieutenant-Governor of New Brunswick
- In office December 23, 1981 – August 14, 1987
- Monarch: Elizabeth II
- Governors General: Edward Schreyer; Jeanne Sauvé
- Premier: Richard Hatfield
- Preceded by: Hédard Robichaud
- Succeeded by: Gilbert Finn

Military service
- Allegiance: Canada

Colonel George Francis Gillman Stanley CC CD FRSC FRHSC(hon) FRHistS (July 6, 1907 – September 13, 2002) was a Canadian author, soldier, historian at the Royal Military College of Canada and Mount Allison University, public servant, former Lieutenant-Governor of New Brunswick, and designer of the Canadian Flag.

== Early life and education ==
George F. G. Stanley was born in Calgary, Alberta, in 1907 and received a BA from the University of Alberta in Edmonton. He studied at Keble College, University of Oxford, in 1929 as the Rhodes Scholar from Alberta, and held a Beit Fellowship in Imperial Studies and a Royal Society of Canada Scholarship. He earned a BA, MA, MLitt and DPhil. Always a keen athlete, he played for the Oxford University Ice Hockey Club, which won the Spengler Cup in 1931. At Oxford, he wrote his book, The Birth of Western Canada: A History of The Riel Rebellions, and began his lifelong work on Louis Riel.

== Academic career ==
=== Beginnings ===
Stanley returned to Canada in 1936 and was appointed a professor of history at Mount Allison University in New Brunswick. He joined the military upon arriving there and qualified as a lieutenant in the New Brunswick Rangers. He served as an infantry training officer in Fredericton and then proceeded overseas during World War II as historian (rising to Deputy-Director) in the Historical Section at Canadian Army Headquarters in London, England; he was also responsible for administering the War Artist Program, whose staff included Bruno Bobak, Molly Lamb Bobak, Alex Colville, Charles Comfort, Lawren P. Harris and Will Ogilvie. Stanley was discharged as a lieutenant-colonel in 1947. He then taught at the University of British Columbia, holding the first chair in Canadian history in Canada. He came out of military retirement in 1948 to help fight floods in the Fraser Valley and was on the Reserve of Officers until 1967. He was awarded a Guggenheim Fellowship (1949) to do research into the history of Canadian government policy in dealing with Aboriginal people.

In 1949, Stanley began teaching at the Royal Military College of Canada (RMC) in Kingston, Ontario, where he remained for twenty years. At RMC, he became head of the History Department, served as the first Dean of Arts for seven years (1962–1969), and began building a faculty in the humanities and social sciences. He taught the first undergraduate course in military history ever given in Canada and wrote a textbook, entitled Canada's Soldiers, 1604–1954: The Military History of An Unmilitary People (1954), which became required reading for every service person for three decades. His students included John de Chastelain, Jack Granatstein, and Desmond Morton. Thanks in part to Stanley's efforts as RMC Dean of Arts, the Royal Military College of Canada Pipes and Drums were equipped in 1965 with most of their highland kit, including the Mackenzie tartan (RMC was established in 1876 when Alexander Mackenzie was prime minister).

While in Kingston he served as secretary and president of the Kingston Historical Society and edited Historic Kingston for several years. He was president of the Arts Society, director of the Art Collection Society, served on various committees working to save Kingston's old limestone buildings, was president of the St. Andrew's Society, and acted as clerk of his church's vestry council. Stanley was president of the Canadian Historical Association (1955–1956), a member of the Massey Commission's Committee on Historic Sites and Monuments (1950–1951), and a founding member of the Archaeological and Historic Sites Board of Ontario (1953–1969). He was chairman of the federal government's Centennial Publications Committee and acted as chairman of centennial celebrations in Pittsburgh Township, Ontario. While Stanley was at the Royal Military College, he suggested the design for the Canadian flag, which was adopted on 15 February 1965.

In 1969, Stanley returned to Mount Allison University to become founding director of the new Canadian Studies program, the first of its kind in Canada. He was also the first holder of the Edgar and Dorothy Davidson Chair of Canadian Studies (1969–1975). At Mount Allison, Stanley taught courses in Canadian civilization, dealing with literature, music, architecture and culture. He served as a member of the Commission de Planification Académique de l'Université de Moncton (1969–1972), and a member of the advisory panel on the Symons Commission on Canadian Studies (1972–1975). He was a founding member of the Atlantic Canada Institute. He also served as member of the Federal Government Advisory Board on Canadian Military Colleges (1973–1979), on the Council of the New Brunswick Army Cadet League and of the Maritime Automobile Association, and as president of the New Brunswick Council of St. John Ambulance. He was a director of the Canadian Association of Rhodes Scholars (1983–1987) and of SEVEC, served as a member of the Advisory Board of the Canadian War Museum (1988–1990) and as honorary colonel of the Royal New Brunswick Regiment (1982–1992), and continued his long-standing role as corresponding member of the Institut d'histoire de l'Amérique française.

=== Retirement and after ===
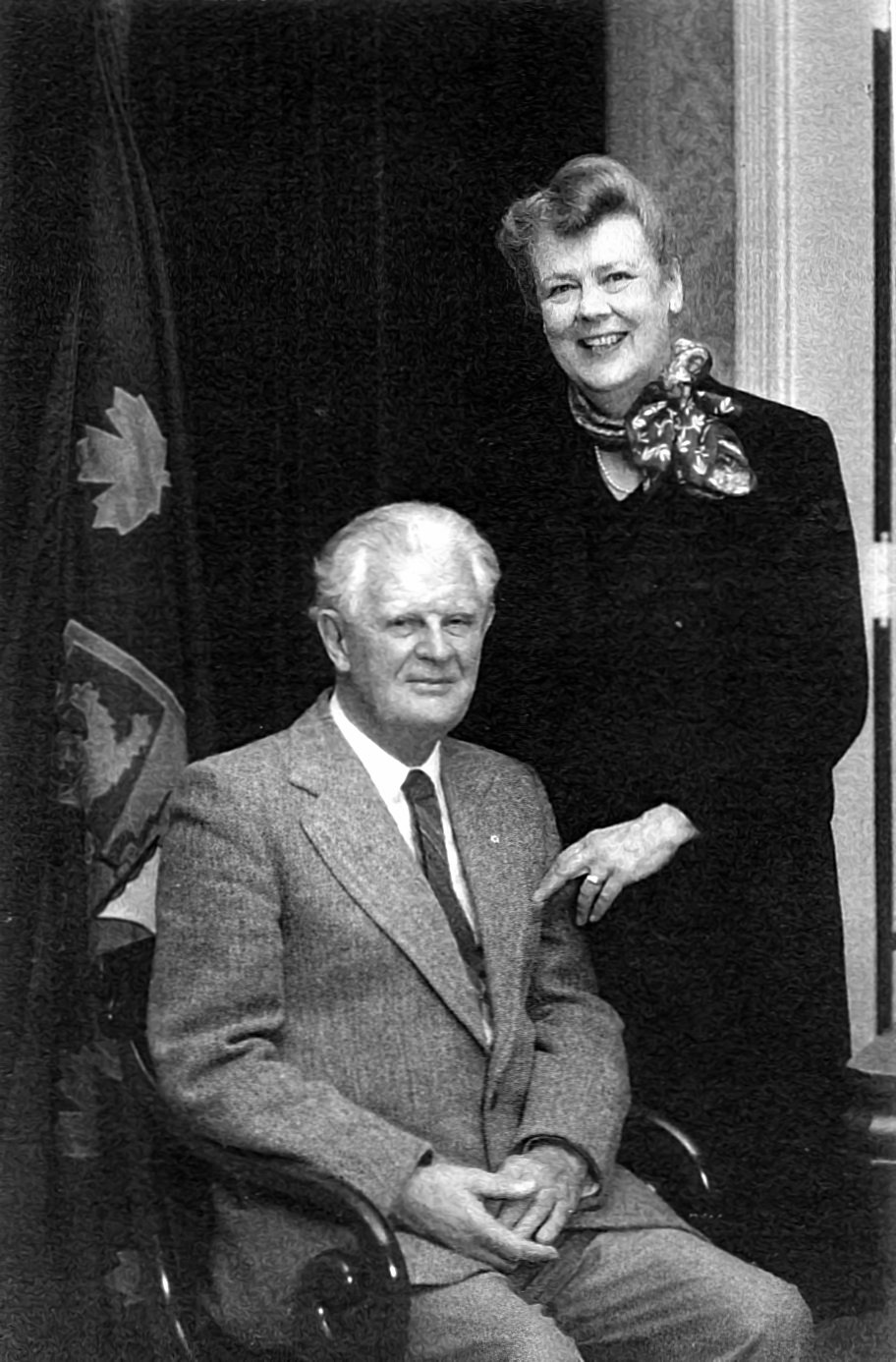
George and Ruth Stanley, Government House, Fredericton, New Brunswick

George Stanley retired from teaching in 1975, but remained active in public life. From 1981 to 1987, he was Lieutenant-Governor of New Brunswick. While Lieutenant-Governor, Stanley continued to act as General Editor of The Collected Writings of Louis Riel in five volumes, which appeared in 1985 after seven years of work by five Canadian scholars; this project was published ahead of schedule and under budget. Well into his nineties, Stanley continued to research, write, read manuscripts, review books, give interviews and talks, encourage young scholars, and maintain an active interest in the militia, cadets, St. John Ambulance, and SEVEC. He answered a steady flow of letters from school children asking about the Canadian flag. He never missed an opportunity to promote Canadian citizenship and love of country. In 1998, he donated his book collection to the Special Collections of the MacKimmie Library at the University of Calgary; his personal papers are now also deposited there. Stanley died in 2002 and was buried with full military honours in Sackville, New Brunswick.

=== Influence ===
In 2003, a former student reflected: "George Stanley was a scholar revered by his peers throughout the world and equally he was held in the same regard by all his former students, many of whom became professional historians and leaders in their fields across Canada. Stanley was the Head of the History Department when I was a young cadet at RMC. In a highly organized and rigidly structured environment, he stood out to us as the perfect role model - a gentleman, a scholar, a friend and later a confidant. He led by example and set his students on a path of personal and individual achievement unhampered by his own prejudices and influences. As a result, Stanley sent his students into the world equipped to make up their own minds and not just echo what they had been taught."

Desmond Morton, one of Stanley's students at RMC in the 1950s, a Canadian military historian and author, and formerly the founding director of Montreal's McGill Institute for the Study of Canada observed: "George's books and their non-conventional wisdom are a great contribution to this country. When you do the unexpected, you make a difference, and George always argued differently -- especially for the rights of French Canada, which wasn't a popular thing to do at the time."

The historian, R.C. [Rod] Macleod of the University of Alberta, has written that: "Much of English Canada's understanding of the formative years of the Canadian West comes from George Stanley's remarkable work, The Birth of Western Canada. Considering that it was one of the earliest works by an academically trained historian in this country, it has stood the test of time remarkably well. No other work of Canadian history published before the Second World War is as regularly read by historians, students and the general public…. [This] subject will always be identified with his name." In 2015, a Supreme Court of Canada decision on language rights cited The Birth of Western Canada.

Serge Bernier, Director of the Directorate of History and Heritage of the Department of National Defence, noted in Stanley's obituary for the Royal Society of Canada: "George Stanley était un grand érudit, mais aussi un « honnête homme ». Plusieurs générations d'historiens canadiens ont été, et sont toujours, influencées par son travail. Des milliers de Canadien(ne)s, étudiant(e)s ou autres, ont appris à connaître et à apprécier ses qualities humaines. La SRC a perdu en George Stanley un de ses plus prestigieux membres, un de ceux qui font que notre Société brille si bien au Canada comme à l'étranger."

== Public life ==
In 1981, Prime Minister Pierre Trudeau advised the appointment of George Stanley to be the 25th Lieutenant-Governor of New Brunswick since Confederation. The mid-1980s were a festive time as New Brunswickers marked their province's bicentennial and many other historic events. During those years, eminent visitors from around the world, such as Queen Elizabeth II and Pope John Paul II, also came to help New Brunswick celebrate. George and Ruth Stanley, with their strong sense of tradition and their comfortable manner with people from all walks of life, brought "a new level of decorum" to this viceregal role. When George Stanley retired from his post as Lieutenant-Governor of New Brunswick in 1987, a testimonial dinner was given in his honour at CFB Gagetown; the guests at the head table were all Canadian generals, who had flown in to honour their former professor from the Royal Military College.

== Family life ==
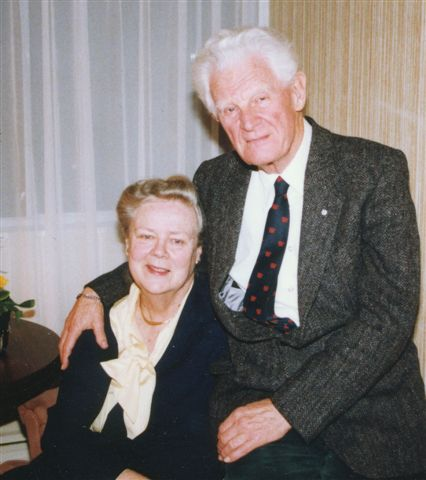
George and Ruth Stanley at home 1997

In 1946, George Stanley married Ruth L. Hill (1922–2017), ONB, BA, BCL, LLD, DCLJ, MMLJ, FRSA, a Montreal lawyer (she was gold medalist in law at McGill University). They had three daughters: Della M.M. Stanley [Hon. Thomas Cromwell], Professor Marietta R.E. Stanley (1952–2008) [formerly married to Maurice McAtamney], and Laurie C.C. Stanley-Blackwell [John D. Blackwell]. The Stanleys also have two grandchildren: Thomas E.G.S. Cromwell [Megan Ormshaw] and Ruth L.H.Q. Stanley-Blackwell.

== Honours ==
In 1976, George Stanley was made an Officer of the Order of Canada and was promoted to Companion in 1994. He was also the recipient of twelve honorary degrees (Laval, Mount Allison, St. Dunstan's, Alberta, Royal Military College, St. Francis Xavier, University of New Brunswick, Dalhousie, Calgary, Ottawa, Moncton and St. Thomas), in addition to his five earned degrees. He was a Fellow of the Royal Society of Canada (FRSC) and of the Royal Historical Society (FRHistS). In 1983, he was made an Honorary Fellow of the Royal Heraldry Society of Canada (FRHSC). In 1950, he was awarded the Royal Society of Canada's J. B. Tyrrell Historical Medal. In 1955, he was elected president of the Canadian Historical Association; his landmark presidential address, entitled "Act or Pact? Another Look at Confederation," has been frequently reprinted and remains a core reading for students of Canadian history. He was Professor Emeritus of both the Royal Military College and Mount Allison University.

Early in his career, Stanley received an Army Efficiency Medal, but in 1992 he was awarded a Canadian Forces' Decoration (CD); at 85, he was almost certainly the oldest Canadian soldier so to be honoured. Stanley was an Honorary Ex-Cadet #H889 of the Royal Military College. He was made a Knight of Justice of the Order of Saint John (and held the Victoria Medal with bar of the Order), a Knight Grand Cross of the "Acadia Commandery of the Military and Hospitaller Order of Saint Lazarus of Jerusalem, Grand Priory in Canada", which he helped establish, and a Comendador of the Brazilian Order of São Paulo. He was a Fellow of the Company of Military Historians and a Paul Harris Fellow of Rotary International. He was a Life Member of the Royal Canadian Legion, the New Brunswick Teachers' Association, the York-Sunbury Historical Society, the Kingston Historical Society, the United Empire Loyalists' Association of Canada, the Military Institute of Fredericton, the Fredericton Garrison Club, and the Union Club of Saint John. While he was the Queen's Representative in New Brunswick, he was made an honorary citizen of the "Republic of Madawaska". In 1994, Stanley was awarded a special certificate of merit by the Kingston Historical Society to mark the 100th anniversary of the Society and to recognize his long devotion to their work and to historical research and architectural conservation.

Historical plaques honouring Stanley have been erected in the Public Library, Stoney Creek, Ontario (includes a bronze bust by Elizabeth Bradford Holbrook), in front of the Public Library, Sackville, New Brunswick, at his boyhood home in Calgary, Alberta, and on the Parade Square, Royal Military College, Kingston, Ontario. Sergeant J.A. Scobbie, 1st Battalion, The King's Own Scottish Borderers, composed a march for bagpipes to mark the occasion of Col. Stanley's official visit to Edinburgh Castle in 1986. Lisa Lapointe has composed and recorded a ballad, entitled "One Single Leaf," honouring Stanley's role in designing the Canadian maple leaf flag. A street is named for him in Sackville, New Brunswick. In 2003, the annual George F.G. Stanley Lecture series in Canadian Studies was established at Mount Allison University to honour his legacy to the university. Stanley's name was added the RMC Wall of Honour in 2015. The Dr. George Stanley School was officially opened in Calgary in 2017. As a Canada 150 project, the town of Sackville, New Brunswick, erected in 2018 a life-size bronze sculpture of Stanley designed by Christian Toth.

== Designer of the Canadian Flag ==
The Flag of Canada

On 23 March 1964, Stanley wrote a formal four-page memorandum to John Matheson, a member of the multi-party parliamentary flag committee, suggesting that the new flag of Canada should be instantly recognizable, use traditional colours, and be a simple design. He included a rough sketch of his design in the memorandum.

Stanley had become friends with Matheson in Kingston, Ontario, where their children learned Scottish dancing together. Two months before the Great Flag Debate erupted on 17 May 1964 with Prime Minister Lester B. Pearson's speech at the Royal Canadian Legion's national convention in Winnipeg, Matheson had paid a visit to Stanley at Royal Military College of Canada. Over lunch at the RMC mess hall, the two discussed heraldry, the history and the future of Canada, and the conundrum of the flag. And as the two men walked across the parade grounds, Stanley gestured toward the roof of the Mackenzie Building and the college flag flapping atop its tower. "There, John, is your flag," Stanley remarked, suggesting the RMC College Flag's red-white-red as a good basis for a distinctive Canadian flag. At the centre, Stanley proposed, should be placed a single red maple leaf instead of the college emblem: a mailed fist holding a sprig of three green maple leaves.

The suggestion was followed by Stanley's detailed memorandum of 23 March 1964 on the history of Canada's emblems, in which he warned that any new flag "must avoid the use of national or racial symbols that are of a divisive nature" and that it would be "clearly inadvisable" to create a flag that carried either a Union Jack or a fleur-de-lis. His vision provided a sound rationale and brought together all the key components of the new flag design. Stanley wrote the pivotal flag memorandum in his study at Cluny House, Pittsburgh Township, just east of Kingston; this fine stone residence was built in 1820 by Colonel Donald Macpherson (c.1755-1829), a maternal uncle of Sir John A. Macdonald. Stanley was forbidden by his superiors at RMC from appearing in person before the Parliamentary Flag Committee, which was made up of 15 MPs from various federal political parties.

The Stanley proposal was placed on a wall of the Flag Committee's meeting room in Ottawa with hundreds of other flag designs, and eventually was selected as one of the final three designs for consideration. In a classic Canadian compromise, the Stanley design, which was supported by the sole NDP member (Reid Scott) on the Flag Committee, beat out John Diefenbaker's flag (a combination of fleurs-de-lis, a maple leaf and the Union Flag) and the Pearson Pennant (three red leaves conjoined on a stem set against a white background with blue bars on either side—a flag proposal designed by Alan Beddoe).

Stanley's design was slightly modified by Jacques Saint-Cyr, a graphic artist with the Canadian Government Exhibition Commission (and ironically a Quebec sovereigntist), who reduced the number of points on the stylized maple leaf from 13 to 11. The Stanley design was officially adopted as the national flag of Canada (replacing the Canadian Red Ensign) by the House of Commons on 15 December 1964 and by the Senate on 17 December 1964, and proclaimed by Queen Elizabeth II, taking effect on 15 February 1965. At 2:00 am on 15 December 1964, following the historic vote in the House of Commons to adopt Stanley's maple leaf design as Canada's new flag, Matheson wrote to Stanley: "Your proposed flag has just now been approved by the Commons 163 to 78. Congratulations. I believe it is an excellent flag that will serve Canada well."

Many Canadians did not yet share this sentiment. Shortly before the official flag raising on Parliament Hill in Ottawa on 15 February 1965 (February 15 was declared National Flag of Canada Day in 1996), Stanley received an anonymous death threat. Unperturbed, he attended the ceremony in a colourful and quintessentially Canadian Hudson's Bay coat, which stood out dramatically in a sea of dark formal attire worn by the other dignitaries.

Support for the new flag grew quickly, including in Quebec. As Matheson noted in his book Canada's Flag (1980), "when in June 1965, Dr. George F.G. Stanley of [the] Royal Military College ... was granted an honorary doctorate at Université Laval, he was loudly applauded by the student body when the Canadian flag was referred to in his citation. The applause interrupted the citation." French-Canadian nationalists had long demanded that the Union Jack (Union Flag) be removed from any future Canadian flag.

Some debate lingered over whether Stanley or Saint-Cyr should get credit for the flag, but it was settled in 1995 when Prime Minister Jean Chrétien officially recognized Stanley as the designer of Canada's flag. Stanley also suggested the name for the Canadian pale, an original vexillological and heraldic device first used in the Maple Leaf flag.

In a feature article for The Canadian Encyclopedia, entitled "The Stanley Flag," Richard Foot observed: "The main players in the flag saga are now gone. Pearson died in 1972, Stanley in 2002 and Matheson in 2013. But what they created has lasted for nearly half a century and counting – flown from the top of the Peace Tower and from thousands of public and private buildings across the country, from embassies around the world, and recently, at Olympic medal ceremonies in Sochi, Russia. The Stanley flag is now a universally-recognized Canadian symbol." Former Governor-General David Johnston has written in a "letter" to George Stanley, "Our flag dares us to press on with the unfinished work of our country: to be ever more free and fair, just and inclusive; to be keener of mind and kinder of heart. ... Amazing what the right flag – your flag, our flag – can do."

== Opposition to immigration in 1938 ==
In their book, None Is Too Many: Canada and the Jews of Europe 1933-1948 (1982), Irving Abella and Harold Troper quote a letter George Stanley wrote on 29 December 1938 to the federal Conservative leader, Robert James Manion, in support of a speech Manion had recently given in Quebec, opposing any immigration "so long as any Canadian remained unemployed." As a novice academic, Stanley had returned to Canada from the University of Oxford in 1936 during the Great Depression and was distressed by the destitution he encountered, particularly in his native western Canada. At that moment (late December 1938), he found it difficult to sympathize with "those who shed tears over the fate of Jews in Europe and who raised funds for the assistance of foreign refugees ... [while they] ignore the distress on their own doorstep. ... Charity begins at home."

Defenders of Stanley on this matter generally note that his opinions, while wrong in retrospect, were also largely irrelevant as Stanley had little personal control over Canadian immigration policy. The exact nature of the Nazi regime was not entirely clear at the time, with many wrongly assuming that their anti-Jewish rhetoric would eventually cool rather than escalate to mass murder. The Canadian government of the era turned away the MS St. Louis from Halifax in June 1939 and sent it back to Europe, where many of the Jewish refugees on board would eventually be murdered in the Holocaust. Stanley served in the Canadian military during World War II, a cause to which he was profoundly committed. One of his responsibilities was supervising the Canadian War Artists, some of whom made depictions of the concentration camps to the world after they were liberated.

== Selected works of G.F.G. Stanley ==
- The Birth of Western Canada: A History of The Riel Rebellions (1936). Reprint (1992) U. of Toronto Press. ISBN 0-8020-6931-2
- Canada's Soldiers, 1604-1954: The Military History of An Unmilitary People (1954) Macmillan, Toronto. ISBN 1-1357-3804-1
- Louis Riel, Patriot or Rebel? (1954) Canadian Historical Association. ISBN 0-8879-8003-1
- In Search of the Magnetic North: A Soldier-surveyor's Letters from the North-west, 1843-1844 (1955) Toronto, Macmillan.
- In the Face of Danger: The History of the Lake Superior Regiment (1960) ISBN 0-9781-4070-2
- For Want of a Horse: Being a Journal of the Campaigns against the Americans in 1776 and 1777 conducted from Canada (1961) Tribune Press.
- Louis Riel (1963). Ryerson Press. 1st Paperback Edition, 1972. 5th Printing 1969. ISBN 0-07-092961-0.
- The Story of Canada's Flag: A Historical Sketch (1965) Ryerson Press. ISBN 0-7700-0197-1
- New France: The Last Phase, 1744-1760 (1968) McClelland and Stewart. ISBN 0-1969-0375-0
- A Short History of the Canadian Constitution (1969) Ryerson Press ISBN 0-7700-0270-6
- The War of 1812: Land Operations (1983) Macmillan of Canada. ISBN 0-7715-9859-9
- The Collected Writings of Louis Riel/Les Ecrits Complets de Louis Riel (1985) University of Alberta Press. (Text in French and English) ISBN 0-88864-091-9
- Toil And Trouble: Military Expeditions To Red River (1989) Dundurn Press Ltd. ISBN 1-55002-059-5
- Battle in the Dark: Stoney Creek, June 6, 1813 (1991). ISBN 978-0-919511-46-0
- The Role of the Lieutenant-Governor: A Seminar (1992). ISBN 1-5504-8679-9
