= Louis-Israël Côté dit Fréchette =

Canadian politician

Louis-Israël Fréchette (né Côté; May 6, 1848 – July 17, 1923) was a merchant and political figure in Quebec. He represented Mégantic in the House of Commons of Canada from 1882 to 1884 and from 1891 to 1896 as a Conservative member. His name appears as Louis-Israël Côté alias Fréchette in English sources.

He was born in Saint-Ferdinand, Canada East to Louis Coté and was educated there. Fréchette married Léda Bernier. He served as postmaster and mayor of St-Ferdinand d'Halifax. His election to the House of Commons in 1882 was declared void in 1884 and François Langelier was elected in the by-election which followed. Fréchette ran unsuccessfully for reelection to the House of Commons in 1896, 1900, 1904 and 1908.

== Electoral record ==
1896 Canadian federal election: Mégantic
Party	Candidate	Votes
Liberal	Georges Turcot	2,064
Conservative	Louis-Israël Côté dit Fréchette	1,410

1900 Canadian federal election: Mégantic
Party	Candidate	Votes
Liberal	Georges Turcot	2,204
Conservative	Louis-Israël Côté dit Fréchette	1,795

1904 Canadian federal election: Mégantic
Party	Candidate	Votes
Liberal	François-Théodore Savoie	2,453
Conservative	Louis-Israël Côté dit Fréchette	1,950

1908 Canadian federal election: Mégantic
Party	Candidate	Votes
Liberal	François-Théodore Savoie	2,800
Conservative	Louis-Israël Côté dit Fréchette	2,365

1882 Canadian federal election: Mégantic
Party	Candidate	Votes
Conservative	Louis-Israël Côté dit Fréchette	1,204
Unknown	L.O. Olivier	1,085
