= Lucien Turcotte Pacaud =

Canadian politician

Member of the Canadian Parliament for Mégantic
- In office 1911–1922
- Preceded by: François-Théodore Savoie
- Succeeded by: Eusèbe Roberge

Acting Canadian High Commissioner to the United Kingdom
- In office 1930–1930
- Prime Minister: W.L. Mackenzie King; R.B. Bennett
- Preceded by: Peter C. Larkin
- Succeeded by: Howard Ferguson

Personal details
- Born: September 21, 1879 Trois-Rivières, Quebec, Canada
- Died: March 5, 1960 (aged 80)
- Party: Liberal

Lucien Turcotte Pacaud (September 21, 1879 – March 5, 1960) was a Canadian lawyer and political figure. He represented Mégantic in the House of Commons of Canada from 1911 to 1922 as a Liberal member.

He was born in Trois-Rivières, Quebec, in 1879, the son of Ernest Pacaud and the grandson of Joseph-Édouard Turcotte. He was educated at Bishop's College and Laval University. Pacaud was admitted to the bar in 1904 and practised at Quebec City and then at Thetford Mines. In 1908, he married Helen Elizabeth Buckmall. Pacaud served as police commissioner for the Transcontinental Railway from 1907 to 1911. He was Parliamentary Under Secretary of State for External Affairs, a non-cabinet post, from 1921 to 1922. He served as Secretary to the Canadian High Commissioner at London from 1922 to 1931. In 1930, Pacaud served as acting Canadian High Commissioner to the United Kingdom after the death of Peter Charles Larkin.

1911 Canadian federal election: Mégantic
Party	Candidate	Votes
Liberal	Lucien Turcotte Pacaud	2,986
Unknown	Louis Honoré Huard	2,619

1917 Canadian federal election: Mégantic
Party	Candidate	Votes
Opposition (Laurier Liberals)	Lucien Turcotte Pacaud	acclaimed

1921 Canadian federal election: Mégantic
Party	Candidate	Votes
Liberal	Lucien Turcotte Pacaud	8,715
Unknown	Alcide Alphonse Blondin	1,749

== See also ==
- List of Bishop's College School alumni

Diplomatic posts
Preceded by Peter Charles Larkin	Acting Canadian High Commissioner to the United Kingdom; 1930	Succeeded by Howard Ferguson
