= National Flag of Canada Day =

Canadian holiday

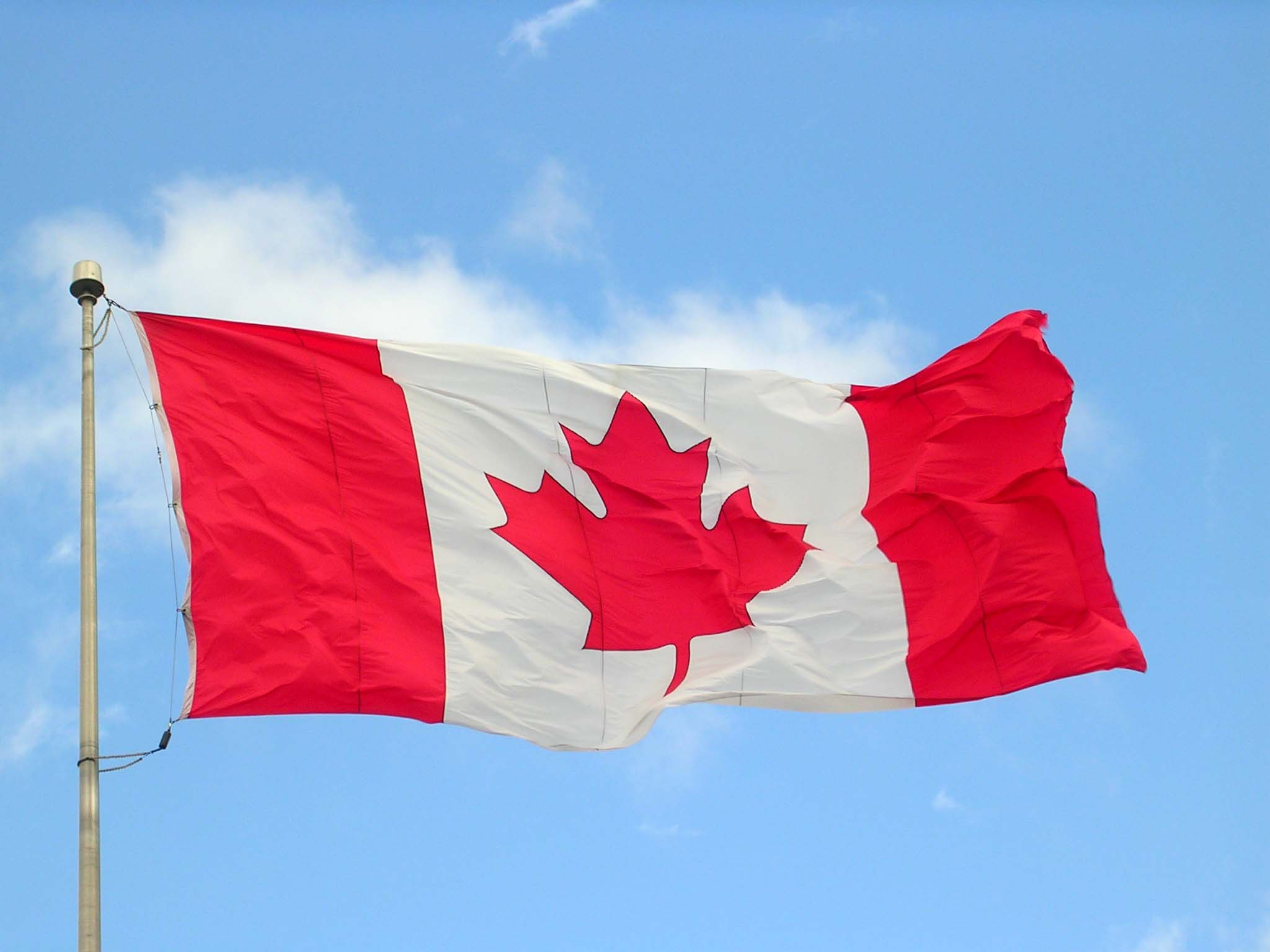
- The national flag of Canada
- Observed by: Canada
- Date: February 15
- Next time: February 15, 2027
- Frequency: Annual

National Flag of Canada Day (French: Jour du drapeau national du Canada), commonly shortened to Flag Day, is observed annually on February 15 to commemorate the inauguration of the flag of Canada on that date in 1965. The day is marked by flying the flag, occasional public ceremonies and educational programs in schools. It is not a public holiday, although there has been discussion about creating one.

== History ==
=== Background ===
Amid much controversy, the Parliament of Canada in 1964 voted to adopt a new design for the Canadian flag and issued a call for submissions. This flag would replace the Canadian Red Ensign, which had been, with various successive alterations, in conventional use as the national flag of Canada since 1868. Nearly 4,000 designs were submitted by Canadians. On October 22, 1964, the Maple Leaf flag—designed by Royal Military College of Canada historian George Stanley—won with a unanimous vote. Under the leadership of Prime Minister Lester Pearson, resolutions recommending the new design were passed by the House of Commons on December 15, 1964, and by the Senate two days later.

The flag was proclaimed by Elizabeth II, Queen of Canada, on January 28, 1965, and took effect "upon, from and after" February 15 that year.

=== Flag Day ===
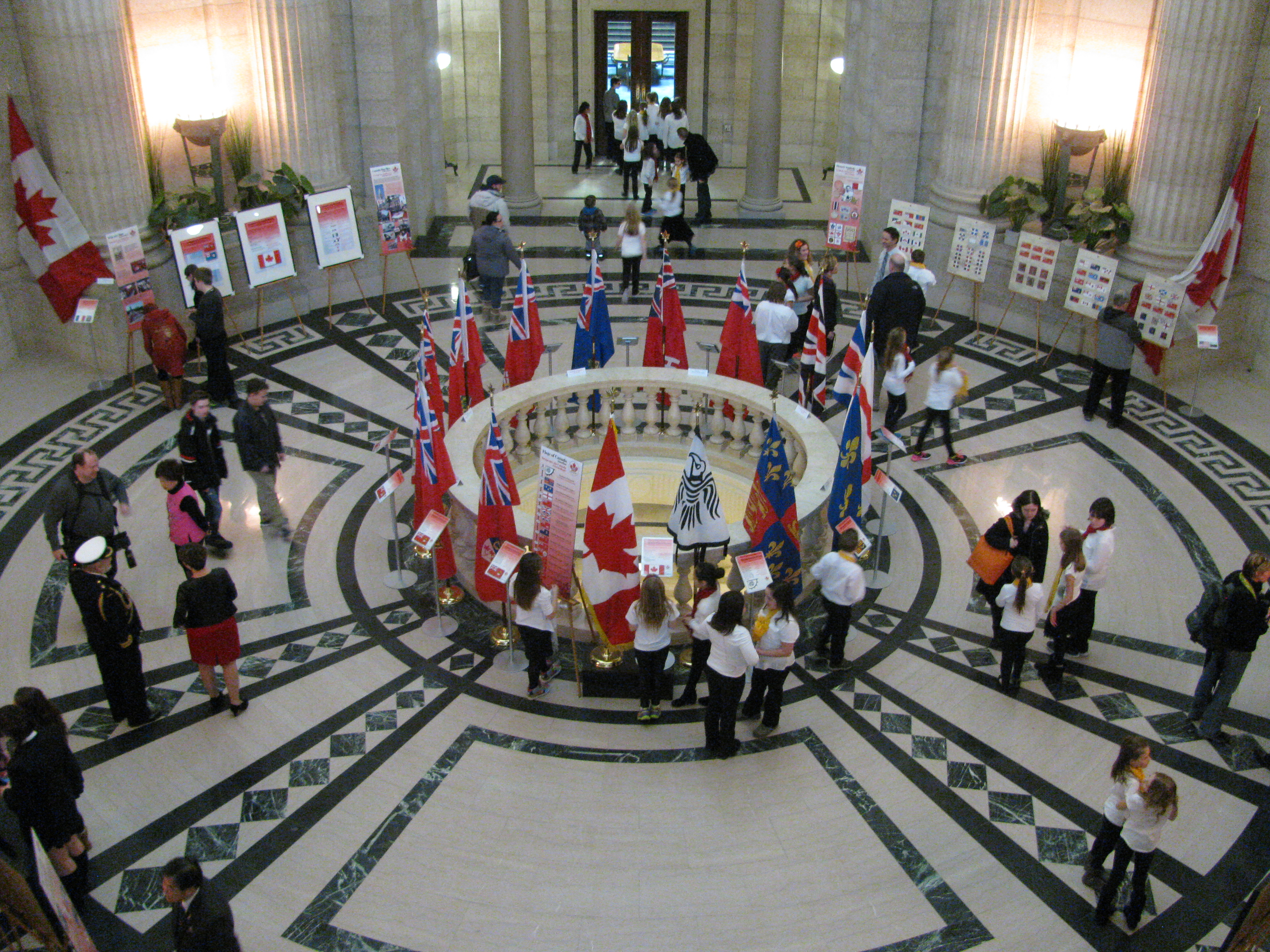
Flag Day at Manitoba Legislative Building, 2015

National Flag of Canada Day was instituted in 1996 by an order in council from Governor General Roméo LeBlanc, on the initiative of Prime Minister Jean Chrétien. At the first Flag Day ceremony in Hull, Quebec, Chrétien was confronted by demonstrators against proposed cuts to the unemployment insurance system, and while walking through the crowd he grabbed by the neck and pushed aside a protester who had approached him.

In 2010, on the flag's 45th anniversary, federal ceremonies were held to mark Flag Day at Ottawa, Winnipeg, St. John's, and at Whistler and Vancouver in conjunction with the 2010 Winter Olympics in Vancouver. In 2011, Prime Minister Stephen Harper observed Flag Day by presenting two citizens, whose work honoured the military, with Canadian flags that had flown over the Peace Tower. It was announced as inaugurating an annual recognition of patriotism.

In 2025, just before the flag's 60th anniversary, Joe Clark, Kim Campbell, Jean Chrétien, Paul Martin and Stephen Harper, the five living former prime ministers of Canada, wrote an open letter calling on all Canadians to fly the flag as a sign of national unity during the 2025 United States trade war with Canada and Mexico.

== See also ==
- Flag Day
- List of Canadian flags
- National flag
