= Hugh Alexander Bryson =

Canadian politician (1912–1987)

Member of the Canadian Parliament for Humboldt—Melfort
- In office 1953–1958
- Preceded by: Riding created in 1952 from parts of Humboldt, Melfort and Yorkton
- Succeeded by: Reynold Rapp

Personal details
- Born: August 21, 1912 Medicine Hat, Alberta, Canada
- Died: October 13, 1987 (aged 75) Saskatoon, Saskatchewan, Canada
- Party: Co-Operative Commonwealth Federation, New Democratic Party
- Occupation: farmer, insurance agent

Hugh Alexander Bryson (August 21, 1912 – October 13, 1987) was a Canadian politician, farmer and insurance agent. He was elected to the House of Commons of Canada in the 1953 election as a Member of the Co-operative Commonwealth Federation to represent the riding of Humboldt—Melfort. He was re-elected in the 1957 election then defeated in the elections of 1958 and for the riding of Humboldt—Melfort—Tisdale in 1962.
