= Louis Richard (politician) =

Canadian politician (1817–1876)

Louis Richard M.L.C.
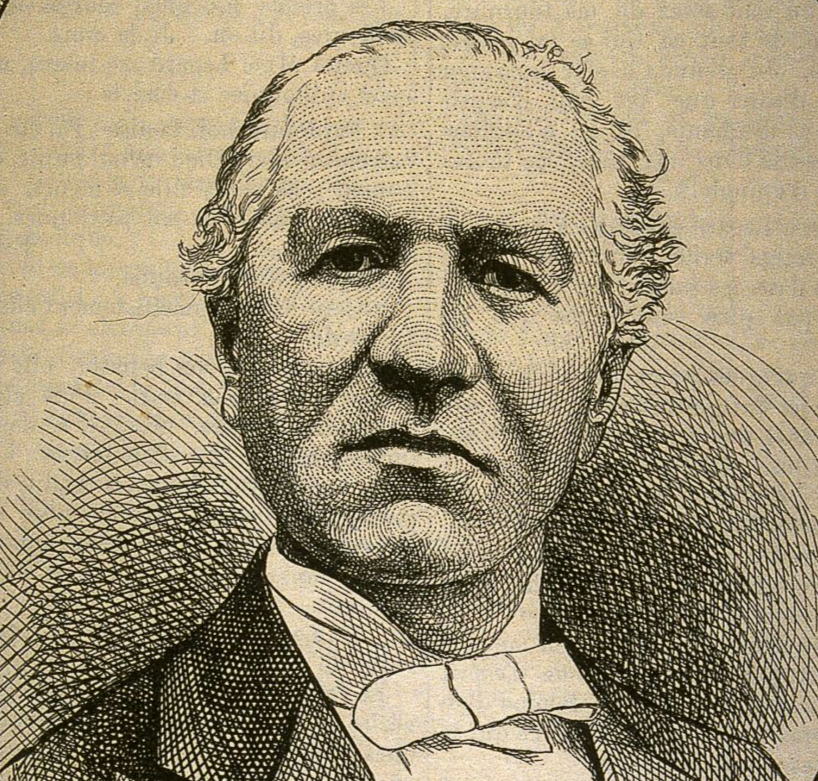

Member of the Legislative Council of Quebec
- In office February 5, 1874 – November 13, 1876
- Preceded by: Isidore Thibaudeau
- Succeeded by: Joseph Gaudet
- Constituency: Kennebec

Personal details
- Born: March 1, 1817 Saint-Grégoire-le-Grand (Bécancour), Lower Canada
- Died: November 13, 1876 (aged 59) Princeville, Quebec
- Party: Conservative Party of Quebec
- Spouse: Hermine Prince
- Children: Édouard Richard
- Profession: Farmer and businessman

Louis Richard (March 1, 1817 – November 13, 1876) was a businessman and politician in Quebec, Canada. He represented the Kennebec division in the Legislative Council of Quebec, the upper chamber of the Legislature of Quebec.

Richard was born at Saint-Grégoire-le-Grand, Bécancour) on March 1, 1817. His parents were a farming couple, Charles-Auguste Richard and Marie-Esther Hébert.

Educated at Saint-Grégoire, he became a farmer in Stanfold county in 1840. He later opened a general store and became involved in the lumber trade. In 1841, he married Hermine Prince. The couple had a son, Édouard Richard, who was a Member of Parliament in the House of Commons from 1872 to 1878.

He was the mayor of Princeville for one year (1857), and then again from 1872 until his death. He was an unsuccessful candidate for the Legislative Council of the Province of Canada for the Kennebec division in 1862.

In 1874, he was named to the Legislative Council of Quebec for the Kennebec division, as a supporter of the Conservative Party of Quebec. He held the position until his death in office in 1876.
