= François-Théodore Savoie =

Canadian politician

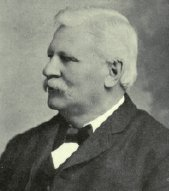

Member of the Canada Parliament for Mégantic
- In office 1905–1911
- Preceded by: Georges Turcot
- Succeeded by: Lucien Turcotte Pacaud

Member of the Legislative Council of Quebec for the Kennebec Division
- In office 1915–1921
- Preceded by: Napoléon-Charles Cormier
- Succeeded by: Paul Tourigny

Personal details
- Born: February 14, 1846 Saint-Calixte-de-Somerset (Plessisville), Canada East
- Died: September 9, 1921 (aged 75) Plessisville, Quebec
- Party: Liberal
- Children: Joseph-Alcide Savoie

François-Théodore Savoie (February 14, 1846 – September 9, 1921) was a Canadian politician.

He was elected to the House of Commons of Canada for the Quebec electoral district of Mégantic in the 1904 federal election. A Liberal, he was re-elected in 1908. In 1915, he was appointed to the Legislative Council of Quebec for the Kennebec Division. He died while in office in 1921.

1904 Canadian federal election: Mégantic
Party	Candidate	Votes
Liberal	François-Théodore Savoie	2,453
Conservative	Louis-Israël Côté dit Fréchette	1,950

1908 Canadian federal election: Mégantic
Party	Candidate	Votes
Liberal	François-Théodore Savoie	2,800
Conservative	Louis-Israël Côté dit Fréchette	2,365
