= Mégantic—Frontenac =

Former federal electoral district in Quebec, Canada

Quebec electoral district

Defunct federal electoral district
- Legislature: House of Commons
- District created: 1933
- District abolished: 1947
- First contested: 1935
- Last contested: 1945

Mégantic—Frontenac was a federal electoral district in the province of Quebec, Canada, that was represented in the House of Commons of Canada from 1935 to 1949.

This riding was created in 1933 from Mégantic and Richmond—Wolfe ridings. It consisted of:

- the county of Mégantic except that part as is included in the municipalities of Leeds, Leeds East, St-Jacques-de-Leeds, Nelson, Ste-Anastasie-de-Nelson and the village of Lyster;
- that part of the county of Frontenac as is included in the municipalities of Courcelles, St-Vital-de-Lambton, St-Evariste-de-Forsyth, St-Méthode-d'Adstock, St-Sébastien and the villages of Lambton and St-Evariste Station;
- that part of the county of Wolfe as is included in the municipalities of Garthby, Stratford, Wolfestown, D'Israeli and the villages of Beaulac and D'Israeli.

It was abolished in 1947 when it was redistributed into Beauce, Compton—Frontenac and Mégantic ridings.

== Members of Parliament ==
This riding elected the following members of Parliament:

| Parliament | Years | Member | Party |
|---|---|---|---|
Mégantic—Frontenac; Riding created from Mégantic and Richmond—Wolfe
| 18th | 1935–1940 | Eusèbe Roberge | Liberal |
| 19th | 1940–1945 | Joseph Lafontaine | Liberal |
| 20th | 1945–1949 | Joseph Lafontaine | Liberal |
Riding dissolved into Beauce, Compton—Frontenac and Mégantic

== Election results ==
1935 Canadian federal election
| Party | Candidate | Votes |
|---|---|---|
| Liberal | Eusèbe Roberge | 8,619 |
| Reconstruction | Joseph-Théophile Beaudoin | 6,064 |
| Conservative | Joseph-Évariste-Omer Béliveau | 1,460 |

1940 Canadian federal election
| Party | Candidate | Votes |
|---|---|---|
| Liberal | Joseph Lafontaine | 10,477 |
| National Government | J.-Émile Fortin | 6,281 |

1945 Canadian federal election
| Party | Candidate | Votes |
|---|---|---|
| Liberal | Joseph Lafontaine | 10,057 |
| Independent | Joseph-Théophile Beaudoin | 7,008 |
| Social Credit | Joseph Gagné | 2,106 |

== See also ==
- List of Canadian electoral districts
- Historical federal electoral districts of Canada
