= Peter Charles Larkin =

Canadian businessman

The Honourable Peter C. Larkin
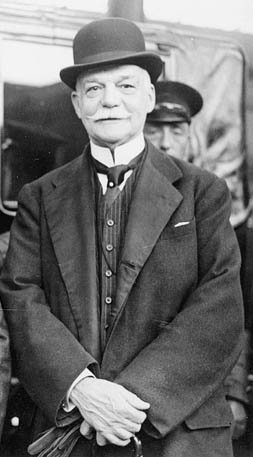
- Larkin in London during the 1926 Imperial Conference

Canadian High Commissioner to the United Kingdom
- In office 1922–1930
- Prime Minister: W.L. Mackenzie King; Arthur Meighen
- Preceded by: Sir George Perley
- Succeeded by: Lucien Pacaud (acting)

Personal details
- Born: Peter Charles Larkin; May 14, 1855 Montreal, Canada East
- Died: February 3, 1930 (aged 74) London, England
- Spouse: Hannah Jean Ross
- Children: 2
- Occupation: Businessman
- Known for: Salada Tea Company

Peter Charles Larkin, PC (May 14, 1855 – February 3, 1930) was a Canadian businessman, diplomat and political patron.

== Business career ==
Larkin, a world traveller who specialized in finding foodstuffs for import, was best known for founding the Salada Tea Company in 1892. Larkin introduced the concept of packaging tea in foil to maintain quality. Previously, tea had been sold in loose form. This innovation proved popular and soon became the industry standard, helping to establish Salada as a leading seller of tea in Canada and the northeastern U.S., with factories in Toronto, Montreal and Boston.

== Political influence ==
Larkin was a close friend of Sir Wilfrid Laurier and William Lyon Mackenzie King. He was one of several wealthy supporters of the Liberal Party of Canada who contributed furniture, china and silver to Laurier House, the residence of Mackenzie King. In the late 1920s, Larkin raised $250,000 for Mackenzie King in order to give him financial security.

As Prime Minister of Canada, Mackenzie King appointed Larkin as Canadian high commissioner to the United Kingdom, a position he held until his death. Larkin was the driving force behind Canada's acquisition of the building later known as Canada House in London to house the Canadian high commission.

== Personal life and death ==
On June 27, 1883, Larkin married Hannah Jean Ross in Cobourg, Ontario. They had one daughter and one son, Gerald Ross Larkin (1885–1961). The latter managed the Salada Tea Company from the 1920s until he retired in 1957.

On February 3, 1930, Larkin died at the age of 74 in London, England.

Diplomatic posts
Preceded by Sir George Perley	Canadian High Commissioner to the United Kingdom; 1922–1930	Succeeded by Lucien Turcotte Pacaud (acting)
