= Édouard Richard =

Canadian politician

Édouard-Émery Richard
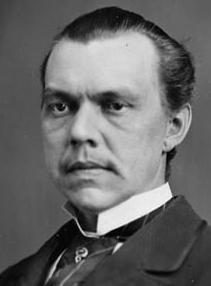

Member of the Canadian Parliament for Megantic
- In office 1872–1878
- Preceded by: George Irvine
- Succeeded by: Louis-Éphrem Olivier

Personal details
- Born: March 14, 1844 Princeville, Canada East
- Died: March 27, 1904 (aged 60) Willow Bunch, Saskatchewan
- Party: Liberal
- Relations: Louis Richard (father), Member of the Legislative Council of Quebec

Édouard-Émery Richard (March 14, 1844 – March 27, 1904) was a Canadian historian and politician.

Richard was born in Princeville, Quebec to Louis-Eusèbe Richard and Hermine Prince. After receiving his law degree in 1867, taking courses at both Université Laval and McGill College, Richard began to practice in Arthabaskaville with Wilfrid Laurier. He practiced for several years before being elected to the House of Commons from Mégantic in 1872 and was re-elected in 1874. His health forced him to not seek reelection in the 1878 Canadian Parliamentary elections. Politically, Richard was a liberal protectionist.

Richard became the sheriff of the North-West Territories soon after leaving the House of Commons, and remained in that position until January 1883. After resigning from his post as sheriff, he sought election to the House of Commons again in 1883 in St. Boniface, but was defeated by Alphonse Alfred Clément Larivière. Richard sought election once more, in 1889 in Provencher, but Lariviére again defeated him.

In between his political posts, Richard was also a fairly successful businessman. Unfortunately, his political campaigns and frequent ill health prevented him from ever amassing substantial wealth.

Richard was of Acadian heritage. Following his last failed campaign, Richard returned to Arthabaskaville and began to immerse himself in his heritage. He fervently promoted the Acadian cause, petitioning for an Acadian museum, working on his own research, and even starting a campaign for reparations. An 1893 article in Toronto by Pierce Stevens Hamilton and histories by Francis Parkman and Thomas Beamish Akins spurred Richard to begin his own published history. His work, Acadia, Missing Links of a Lost Chapter in American History, was published in two volumes in 1895. His work was controversial, both for mixing English and French in text and, more significantly, lacking annotations and citations. His book was republished with annotations added by his cousin, Henri d'Arles, from 1916 to 1921. Despite this controversy, his work brought him accolades, including an election to the Royal Society of Canada and an honorary doctorate from Université Laval. In 1897, Richard, who never married, was named the successor to Joseph Marmette as the official Canadian archivist in France. This was his last main work before his death in Green Bluff NWT (Richard, Saskatchewan), in 1904.

1872 Canadian federal election: Mégantic
Party	Candidate	Votes
Liberal	Édouard Richard	975
Unknown	Triganne	857
Source: Canadian Elections Database

1874 Canadian federal election: Mégantic
Party	Candidate	Votes
Liberal	Édouard Richard	1,003
Unknown	J. Reed	621
Unknown	L.P.E. Crépeau	252
Source: Canadian Elections Database
