= Andrew Kennedy (Canadian politician) =

Canadian politician

Andrew Kennedy (January 3, 1842 – February 10, 1904) was a construction contractor and political figure in Quebec. He represented Mégantic in the Legislative Assembly of Quebec from 1876 to 1878 as a Conservative.

He was born in Mégantic County, the son of Daniel Kennedy and Mary Sheridan, and was educated there and in Worcester, Massachusetts. Kennedy returned to Canada East during the American Civil War, settling in Saint-Ferdinand. He was involved in construction in Texas, Kansas, British Columbia and Alberta. Kennedy was elected to the Quebec assembly in an 1876 by-election held after George Irvine resigned his seat. He was defeated by Irvine when he ran for reelection in 1878. In 1888, Kennedy married Marie Cloutier. He died in Saint-Ferdinand at the age of 62.
