= Georges Turcot =

Canadian politician

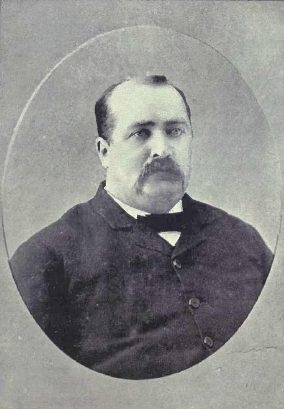

Member of the Canadian Parliament for Mégantic
- In office 1887–1891
- Preceded by: François Langelier
- Succeeded by: Louis-Israël Côté dit Fréchette
- In office 1896–1904
- Preceded by: Louis-Israël Côté dit Fréchette
- Succeeded by: François-Théodore Savoie

Personal details
- Born: September 13, 1851 Ste-Marie de Beauce, Canada East
- Died: March 15, 1908 (aged 56)
- Party: Liberal

Georges Turcot (September 13, 1851 – March 15, 1908) was a Canadian politician.

Born in Ste-Marie de Beauce, Canada East, the son of Augustin Turcot, and Margaret Tardif, he was educated at the College of Ste. Marie. A merchant, he was elected to the House of Commons of Canada for the riding of Mégantic in the 1887 federal election. A Liberal, he was defeated in the 1891 election and was re-elected in the 1896 election and 1900 election. He was also secretary-treasurer of the municipality, a member of the Municipal Council and mayor for three years, and was warden of the county.

== Electoral record ==
1896 Canadian federal election: Mégantic
Party	Candidate	Votes
Liberal	Georges Turcot	2,064
Conservative	Louis-Israël Côté dit Fréchette	1,410

1900 Canadian federal election: Mégantic
Party	Candidate	Votes
Liberal	Georges Turcot	2,204
Conservative	Louis-Israël Côté dit Fréchette	1,795
