= George Irvine (politician) =

Canadian politician (1826–1897)

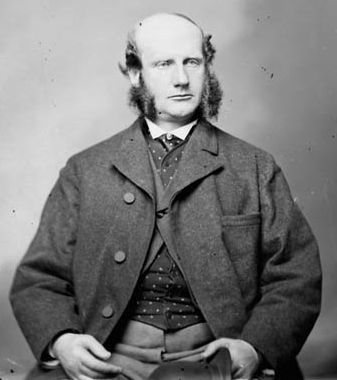

Member of the Canadian Parliament for Mégantic
- In office 1867–1872
- Succeeded by: Édouard Richard

Member of the Legislative Assembly of Quebec for Mégantic
- In office 1867–1876
- Succeeded by: Andrew Kennedy
- In office 1878–1884
- Preceded by: Andrew Kennedy
- Succeeded by: John Whyte

Personal details
- Born: November 16, 1826 Quebec City, Lower Canada
- Died: February 24, 1897 (aged 70) Quebec City, Quebec
- Party: Conservative

George Irvine (November 16, 1826 – February 24, 1897) was a Quebec lawyer, judge, professor and political figure. He represented Mégantic in the Legislative Assembly of Quebec from 1867 to 1876 and in the 1st Canadian Parliament from 1867 to 1872 as a Conservative.

He was born in Quebec City in 1826, the son of Lt.-Colonel John George Irvine (1802–1871) of Quebec, and a grandson of James Irvine and Mathew Bell. He studied law and was called to the bar in 1848. He taught commercial law at Morrin College. He served on the municipal council for Quebec City from 1859 to 1862. Irvine was elected to the Legislative Assembly of the Province of Canada for Mégantic in 1863. In 1867, he was elected to both the federal and provincial assemblies; he was named solicitor general in the Quebec cabinet, serving in that post from 1867 to 1873. He was named Queen's Counsel in 1868. Irvine served attorney general for the province from 1873 to 1874. In 1876, he resigned from his seat in the Quebec assembly to serve as commissioner for the Quebec, Montreal, Ottawa and Occidental Railway. He was president of the Quebec Bar from 1872 to 1873 and from 1884 to 1885. Irvine also served as chancellor for Bishop's College from 1875 to 1878. He resigned from the provincial assembly in 1884 to accept an appointment as judge in the Court of Vice-Admiralty in the Quebec district; in 1891, he was named to the Exchequer Court in the same district.

He died in Quebec City in 1897.

1867 Canadian federal election: Mégantic
Party	Candidate	Votes
Conservative	George Irvine	1,000
Unknown	P. J. O. Triganne	733
Eligible voters		2,226
Source: Canadian Parliamentary Guide, 1871
