= Eusèbe Roberge =

Canadian politician

Member of Parliament for Mégantic
- In office November 1922 – October 1935
- Preceded by: Lucien Turcotte Pacaud
- Succeeded by: riding dissolved

Member of Parliament for Mégantic—Frontenac
- In office October 1935 – January 1940
- Preceded by: riding created
- Succeeded by: Joseph Lafontaine

Personal details
- Born: 3 June 1874 Laurierville, Quebec
- Died: 10 April 1957 (aged 82)
- Party: Liberal
- Spouse(s): Marie Rousseau m. 30 May 1894
- Profession: Merchant

Eusèbe Roberge (3 June 1874 – 10 April 1957) was a Liberal party member of the House of Commons of Canada. He was born in Laurierville, Quebec and became a merchant.

Roberge attended the Collège de Levis.

He was acclaimed to Parliament at the Mégantic riding in a by-election on 20 November 1922 then re-elected in 1925, 1926 and 1930. With riding changes, Roberge was re-elected in 1935 when his riding became Mégantic—Frontenac. After completing his term in the 18th Canadian Parliament, Roberge did not seek another term in the 1940 federal election.
