= Louis-Éphrem Olivier =

Canadian politician

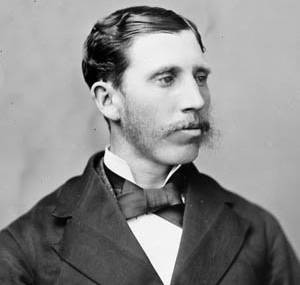
Louis-Éphrem Olivier Source: Library and Archives Canada

Louis-Éphrem Olivier (28 August 1848 – 21 December 1882) was a medical doctor and political figure in Quebec, Canada. He represented Mégantic in the House of Commons of Canada from 1878 to 1882 as a Liberal member.

He was born in Saint-Nicolas, Canada East, the son of Jean Baptiste Olivier and Thessile Plante, and was educated at the Séminaire de Québec. In 1875, he married Maria Adelia Pelletier. Olivier was unsuccessful when he ran for reelection in 1882. He died later that year at the age of 34.

1878 Canadian federal election: Mégantic
Party	Candidate	Votes
Liberal	Louis-Éphrem Olivier	1,191
Unknown	Jos E. Turgeon	881
