= Raymond Langlois =

Canadian politician (1936–1996)

- Official 1966 portrait

Member of Parliament for Mégantic
- In office 1962–1968

Personal details
- Born: 10 April 1936 Wolseley, Saskatchewan, Canada
- Died: 12 August 1996 (aged 60)
- Party: Social Credit
- Profession: professor

Raymond Langlois (10 April 1936 – 12 August 1996) was a Ralliement créditiste and Social Credit party member of the House of Commons of Canada. He was a professor by career.

He was first elected at the Mégantic riding in the 1962 general election, then re-elected there in 1963 and 1965. While serving in Parliament, he was his party's representative on the House of Commons committee inquiring into the creation of a new Canadian flag.

After completing his term in the 27th Canadian Parliament, Langlois left the House of Commons and did not seek re-election in the 1968 election. He was unsuccessful in an attempt to return to Parliament in the 1972 election at Lapointe riding.

1962 Canadian federal election: Mégantic
Party	Candidate	Votes
Social Credit	Raymond Langlois	15,395
Liberal	Gabriel Roberge	7,609
Progressive Conservative	Jean-Luc Dutil	5,822

1963 Canadian federal election: Mégantic
Party	Candidate	Votes
Social Credit	Raymond Langlois	11,329
Liberal	Luc Gilbert-Lessard,	9,140
Progressive Conservative	Fernand Gagné	4,267
New Democratic	Klaude Poulin	1,115

1965 Canadian federal election: Mégantic
Party	Candidate	Votes
Ralliement créditiste	Raymond Langlois	11,195
Liberal	Gaétan Théberge	9,486
Progressive Conservative	Fernand Gagné	2,634
New Democratic	Claude Lafleur	1,641
