= Joseph Lafontaine (Quebec MP) =

Canadian politician (1885–1965)

Joseph Lafontaine (4 April 1885 – 14 December 1965) was a merchant and political figure in Quebec. He represented Mégantic—Frontenac and then Mégantic in the House of Commons of Canada as a Liberal member from 1940 to 1958.

He was born in St-Calixte de Somerset, Quebec, the son of Grégoire Lafontaine and Aurélie Tourigny, and was educated in Arthabaska. In 1906, he married Marie-Louise Boisvert. Lafontaine was an unsuccessful candidate for a seat in the Quebec assembly in 1935. He lived in Thetford Mines.

1949 Canadian federal election: Mégantic
Party	Candidate	Votes
Liberal	Joseph Lafontaine	13,273
Progressive Conservative	Oliva Cyr	6,791
Union des électeurs	Joseph Gagné	2,230
Co-operative Commonwealth	Émile Grenier	415

1953 Canadian federal election: Mégantic
Party	Candidate	Votes
Liberal	Joseph Lafontaine	13,951
Progressive Conservative	Albert Coté	8,420

1957 Canadian federal election: Mégantic
Party	Candidate	Votes
Liberal	Joseph Lafontaine	15,378
Progressive Conservative	Robert Gervais	8,300
