= Daniel Lee Redman =

Canadian politician (1889–1948)

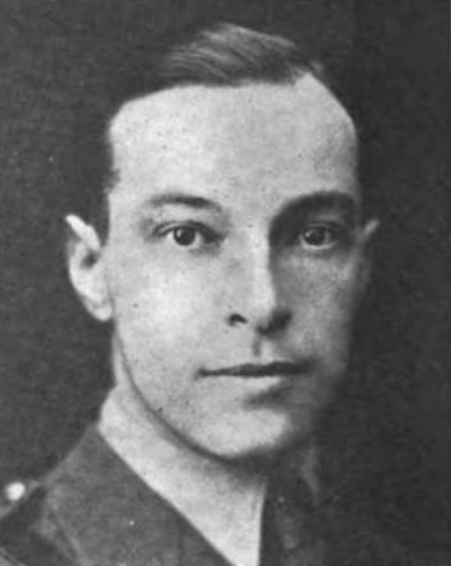

Member of the Canadian Parliament for East Calgary
- In office 1917–1921
- Preceded by: New District
- Succeeded by: William Irvine

Personal details
- Born: October 4, 1889 Oil City, Ontario, Canada
- Died: April 8, 1948 (aged 58) Calgary, Alberta
- Party: Unionist

Daniel Lee Redman (October 4, 1889 – April 8, 1948) was a lawyer, soldier and a Canadian federal politician.

Born in Oil City, Ontario, Redman served in the 103rd Regiment "Calgary Rifles", and then served overseas with the Canadian Expeditionary Force in the First World War.

Redman returned to Calgary and ran in the 1917 Canadian federal election as the Unionist coalition candidate in East Calgary. He ended up winning the district defeating future Member of Parliament William Irvine in a landslide.

Redman served one term in the House of Commons of Canada before retiring in 1921.

He died at Holy Cross Hospital in Calgary on April 8, 1948.
