= Reynold Rapp =

Canadian politician

- Official 1966 portrait

Member of Parliament for Humboldt—Melfort—Tisdale Humboldt—Melfort (1958–1962)
- In office March 31, 1958 – June 25, 1968
- Preceded by: Hugh Alexander Bryson
- Succeeded by: Riding abolished

Personal details
- Born: 26 December 1901 Crimea, Russian Empire
- Died: 17 June 1972 (aged 70)
- Party: Progressive Conservative
- Profession: Farmer

Reynold Rapp (26 December 1901 – 17 June 1972) was a Progressive Conservative party member of the House of Commons of Canada. He was born to ethnic German parents in Crimea, Russian Empire and became a farmer by career.

He was first elected at the Humboldt—Melfort riding in the 1958 general election. After the riding became known as Humboldt—Melfort—Tisdale, Rapp was re-elected there in 1962, 1963 and 1965. After completing his final term in 1968, the 27th Canadian Parliament, he did not seek another term in Parliament and left federal politics.

Rapp was party Whip in 1967 and 1968.

He resided in the village Spalding, Saskatchewan, where he farmed and was the village overseer from 1950 to 1957; in 1971 his family home, the Reynold Rapp Residence, was donated to the community to form the basis for a museum that opened in his honor in 1972.
