= Humboldt—Melfort =

Former federal electoral district in Saskatchewan, Canada

Humboldt—Melfort (also known as Humboldt—Melfort—Tisdale) was a federal electoral district in Saskatchewan, Canada, that was represented in the House of Commons of Canada from 1952 to 1968. This riding was created in 1952 from parts of Humboldt, Melfort and Yorkton ridings. In 1961, the riding was renamed "Humboldt—Melfort—Tisdale".

The riding was abolished in 1966 when it was redistributed into Mackenzie, Prince Albert, Regina East, Regina—Lake Centre and Saskatoon—Humboldt ridings.

== Election results ==
1953 Canadian federal election
Party	Candidate	Votes
Co-operative Commonwealth	Hugh Alexander Bryson	9,512
Liberal	Joseph Ingolph Hetland	8,068
Progressive Conservative	Orest Bendas	1,674
Social Credit	Theodore John Fernholz	1,647

1957 Canadian federal election
Party	Candidate	Votes
Co-operative Commonwealth	Hugh Alexander Bryson	7,326
Liberal	George Edward Noble	5,412
Progressive Conservative	Selman Wall Boyd	4,736
Social Credit	Peter Dueck	3,025

1958 Canadian federal election
Party	Candidate	Votes
Progressive Conservative	Reynold Rapp	9,975
Co-operative Commonwealth	Hugh Alexander Bryson	6,619
Liberal	J.N. Gale	3,501

1962 Canadian federal election
Party	Candidate	Votes
Progressive Conservative	Reynold Rapp	11,551
New Democratic	Hugh Alexander Bryson	5,071
Liberal	Walter Pappenfus	4,157
Social Credit	Kenneth Naber	1,319

1963 Canadian federal election
Party	Candidate	Votes
Progressive Conservative	Reynold Rapp	12,010
New Democratic	Don S. Leitch	4,245
Liberal	M. Charles R. Batten	3,970
Social Credit	Peter Dueck	983

1965 Canadian federal election
Party	Candidate	Votes
Progressive Conservative	Reynold Rapp	11,256
New Democratic	Bill Tait	5,135
Liberal	George Thomas Taylor	3,604
Social Credit	Peter Dueck	561

== See also ==
- List of Canadian electoral districts
- Historical federal electoral districts of Canada
