= Gabriel Roberge =

Canadian politician

Member of Parliament for Mégantic
- In office March 1958 – June 1962

Personal details
- Born: 30 March 1918 Saint-Ferdinand d'Halifax, Quebec, Canada
- Died: 5 July 2006 (aged 88) Quebec City, Quebec, Canada
- Party: Liberal
- Spouse: Denyse Lemay
- Profession: lawyer

Gabriel Roberge (30 March 1918 – 5 July 2006) was a Liberal party member of the House of Commons of Canada. He was a lawyer by profession.

Roberge was born in Saint-Ferdinand d'Halifax, Quebec. He graduated twice from Université Laval, first in 1938 with a Bachelor of Arts, then in 1941 with a Bachelor of Laws. He served in the military with Le Régiment de la Chaudière, reaching the rank of Second Lieutenant in 1941, and left the forces in 1946 as a Captain.

He was first elected at the Mégantic riding in the 1958 general election. After serving one term in the 24th Parliament, he was defeated in the 1962 election by Raymond Langlois of the Social Credit Party. He became a Quebec Superior Court judge in October 1963.

Roberge also helped establish the Kiwanis club in Thetford Mines and has been a knight of the Order of Saint Lazarus since 1974. He died on 5 July 2006, in Quebec City.

1958 Canadian federal election: Mégantic
Party	Candidate	Votes
Liberal	Gabriel Roberge	13,486
Progressive Conservative	C.-Benoît Chartier	13,030
Independent Liberal	Gérard Sirois	246
