= Mégantic (federal electoral district) =

Former federal electoral district in Quebec, Canada

Quebec electoral district

Defunct federal electoral district
- Legislature: House of Commons
- District created: 1947
- District abolished: 1967
- First contested: 1949
- Last contested: 1965

Mégantic was a federal electoral district in the province of Quebec, Canada, that was represented in the House of Commons of Canada from 1867 to 1935, and from 1949 to 1968.

== History ==
It was created by the British North America Act, 1867. It was abolished in 1935 when it was redistributed into the Lotbinière and Mégantic—Frontenac electoral districts.

The riding was created again in 1947 from Lotbinière and Mégantic—Frontenac, was defined to consist of:

- the county of Mégantic, (except the municipalities of Nelson, Ste-Anastasie-de-Nelson and the village of Lyster), the city of Thetford Mines and the town of Black Lake;
- that part of the county of Frontenac included in the municipalities of Courcelles, St-Vital-de-Lambton, St-Evariste-de-Forsyth, St-Méthode-de-Frontenac and the villages of Lambton and St-Evariste-Station;
- that part of the county of Wolfe included in the municipalities of Garthby, Stratford, Wolfestown, D'Israeli, Ste-Praxède and the villages of Beaulac and D'Israeli, together with that part of the municipality of Saints-Martyrs Canadiens included in the township of Garthby.

In 1952, it was redefined to consist of

- the county of Mégantic, (except the township municipality of Nelson, the municipality of Sainte-Anastasie-de-Nelson and the village municipality of Lyster), the city of Thetford-Mines and the town of Black Lake;
- that part of the county of Frontenac included in the municipalities of Lambton, Saint-Evariste-de-Forsyth, Sainte-Méthode-de-Frontenac, the parish municipality of Courcelles and the village municipalities of Lambton and La Guadeloupe;
- that part of the county of Wolfe included in the township municipalities of Garthby, Stratford and Wolfestown, the municipality of Disraeli, the parish municipality of Sainte-Praxède, the village municipalities of Beaulac and Disraeli, together with that part of the parish municipality of Saints-Martyrs Canadiens included in the township of Garthby.

It was abolished in 1966 when it was redistributed into Compton, Frontenac and Richmond.

== Members of Parliament ==
This riding elected the following members of Parliament:

Parliament	Years	Member	Party
Mégantic
1st	1867–1872	George Irvine	Conservative
2nd	1872–1874	Édouard Richard	Liberal
3rd	1874–1878	Édouard Richard	Liberal
4th	1878–1882	Louis-Éphrem Olivier	Liberal
5th	1882–1884	Louis-Israël Côté dit Fréchette	Conservative
5th	1884–1887	François Langelier	Liberal
6th	1887–1891	Georges Turcot	Liberal
7th	1891–1896	Louis-Israël Côté dit Fréchette	Conservative
8th	1896–1900	Georges Turcot	Liberal
9th	1900–1904	Georges Turcot	Liberal
10th	1904–1908	François-Théodore Savoie	Liberal
11th	1908–1911	François-Théodore Savoie	Liberal
12th	1911–1917	Lucien Turcotte Pacaud	Liberal
13th	1917–1921	Lucien Turcotte Pacaud	Opposition (Laurier Liberals)
14th	1921–1922	Lucien Turcotte Pacaud	Liberal
14th	1922–1925	Eusèbe Roberge	Liberal
15th	1925–1926	Eusèbe Roberge	Liberal
16th	1926–1930	Eusèbe Roberge	Liberal
17th	1930–1935	Eusèbe Roberge	Liberal
Riding dissolved into Lotbinière and Mégantic—Frontenac
Riding re-created from Lotbinière and Mégantic—Frontenac
21st	1949–1953	Joseph Lafontaine	Liberal
22nd	1953–1957	Joseph Lafontaine	Liberal
23rd	1957–1958	Joseph Lafontaine	Liberal
24th	1958–1962	Gabriel Roberge	Liberal
25th	1962–1963	Raymond Langlois	Social Credit
26th	1963–1963	Raymond Langlois	Social Credit
26th	1963–1965	Raymond Langlois	Ralliement créditiste
27th	1965–1968	Raymond Langlois	Ralliement créditiste
Riding dissolved into Compton, Frontenac and Richmond

== Election results ==
=== Mégantic, 1867–1935 ===
1867 Canadian federal election
Party	Candidate	Votes
Conservative	George Irvine	1,000
Unknown	P. J. O. Triganne	733
Eligible voters		2,226
Source: Canadian Parliamentary Guide, 1871

1872 Canadian federal election
Party	Candidate	Votes
Liberal	Édouard Richard	975
Unknown	Triganne	857
Source: Canadian Elections Database

1874 Canadian federal election
Party	Candidate	Votes
Liberal	Édouard Richard	1,003
Unknown	J. Reed	621
Unknown	L.P.E. Crépeau	252
Source: Canadian Elections Database

1878 Canadian federal election
Party	Candidate	Votes
Liberal	Louis-Éphrem Olivier	1,191
Unknown	Jos E. Turgeon	881

1882 Canadian federal election
Party	Candidate	Votes
Conservative	Louis-Israël Côté dit Fréchette	1,204
Unknown	L.O. Olivier	1,085

By-election on 10 June 1884 On election being declared void, 1 April 1884
Party	Candidate	Votes
Liberal	François Langelier	1,259
Unknown	J.E. Turgeon	1,222

1887 Canadian federal election
Party	Candidate	Votes
Liberal	Georges Turcot	1,471
Unknown	L.D. Larose	1,336

1891 Canadian federal election
Party	Candidate	Votes
Conservative	Louis-Israël Côté dit Fréchette	1,658
Liberal	George Turcot	1,547

1896 Canadian federal election
Party	Candidate	Votes
Liberal	Georges Turcot	2,064
Conservative	Louis-Israël Côté dit Fréchette	1,410

1900 Canadian federal election
Party	Candidate	Votes
Liberal	Georges Turcot	2,204
Conservative	Louis-Israël Côté dit Fréchette	1,795

1904 Canadian federal election
Party	Candidate	Votes
Liberal	François-Théodore Savoie	2,453
Conservative	Louis-Israël Côté dit Fréchette	1,950

1908 Canadian federal election
Party	Candidate	Votes
Liberal	François-Théodore Savoie	2,800
Conservative	Louis-Israël Côté dit Fréchette	2,365

1911 Canadian federal election
Party	Candidate	Votes
Liberal	Lucien Turcotte Pacaud	2,986
Unknown	Louis Honoré Huard	2,619

1917 Canadian federal election
Party	Candidate	Votes
Opposition (Laurier Liberals)	Lucien Turcotte Pacaud	acclaimed

1921 Canadian federal election
Party	Candidate	Votes
Liberal	Lucien Turcotte Pacaud	8,715
Unknown	Alcide Alphonse Blondin	1,749

By-election on 20 November 1922 On Pacaud's acceptance of an office of emolument under the Crown, 26 October 1922
Party	Candidate	Votes
Liberal	Eusèbe Roberge	acclaimed

1925 Canadian federal election
Party	Candidate	Votes
Liberal	Eusèbe Roberge	6,929
Conservative	Wilfrid Laliberté	3,262

1926 Canadian federal election
Party	Candidate	Votes
Liberal	Eusèbe Roberge	6,483
Conservative	Camille Roberge	3,243

1930 Canadian federal election
Party	Candidate	Votes
Liberal	Eusèbe Roberge	7,609
Conservative	Joseph-Théophile Beaudoin	5,757
Source: Canadian Elections Database

=== Mégantic, 1949–1968 ===
1949 Canadian federal election
Party	Candidate	Votes
Liberal	Joseph Lafontaine	13,273
Progressive Conservative	Oliva Cyr	6,791
Union des électeurs	Joseph Gagné	2,230
Co-operative Commonwealth	Émile Grenier	415

1953 Canadian federal election
Party	Candidate	Votes
Liberal	Joseph Lafontaine	13,951
Progressive Conservative	Albert Coté	8,420

1957 Canadian federal election
Party	Candidate	Votes
Liberal	Joseph Lafontaine	15,378
Progressive Conservative	Robert Gervais	8,300

1958 Canadian federal election
Party	Candidate	Votes
Liberal	Gabriel Roberge	13,486
Progressive Conservative	C.-Benoît Chartier	13,030
Independent Liberal	Gérard Sirois	246

1962 Canadian federal election
Party	Candidate	Votes
Social Credit	Raymond Langlois	15,395
Liberal	Gabriel Roberge	7,609
Progressive Conservative	Jean-Luc Dutil	5,822

1963 Canadian federal election
Party	Candidate	Votes
Social Credit	Raymond Langlois	11,329
Liberal	Luc Gilbert-Lessard,	9,140
Progressive Conservative	Fernand Gagné	4,267
New Democratic	Klaude Poulin	1,115

1965 Canadian federal election
Party	Candidate	Votes
Ralliement créditiste	Raymond Langlois	11,195
Liberal	Gaétan Théberge	9,486
Progressive Conservative	Fernand Gagné	2,634
New Democratic	Claude Lafleur	1,641

== See also ==
- List of Canadian electoral districts
- Historical federal electoral districts of Canada
