= Lists of members of the Canadian House of Commons =

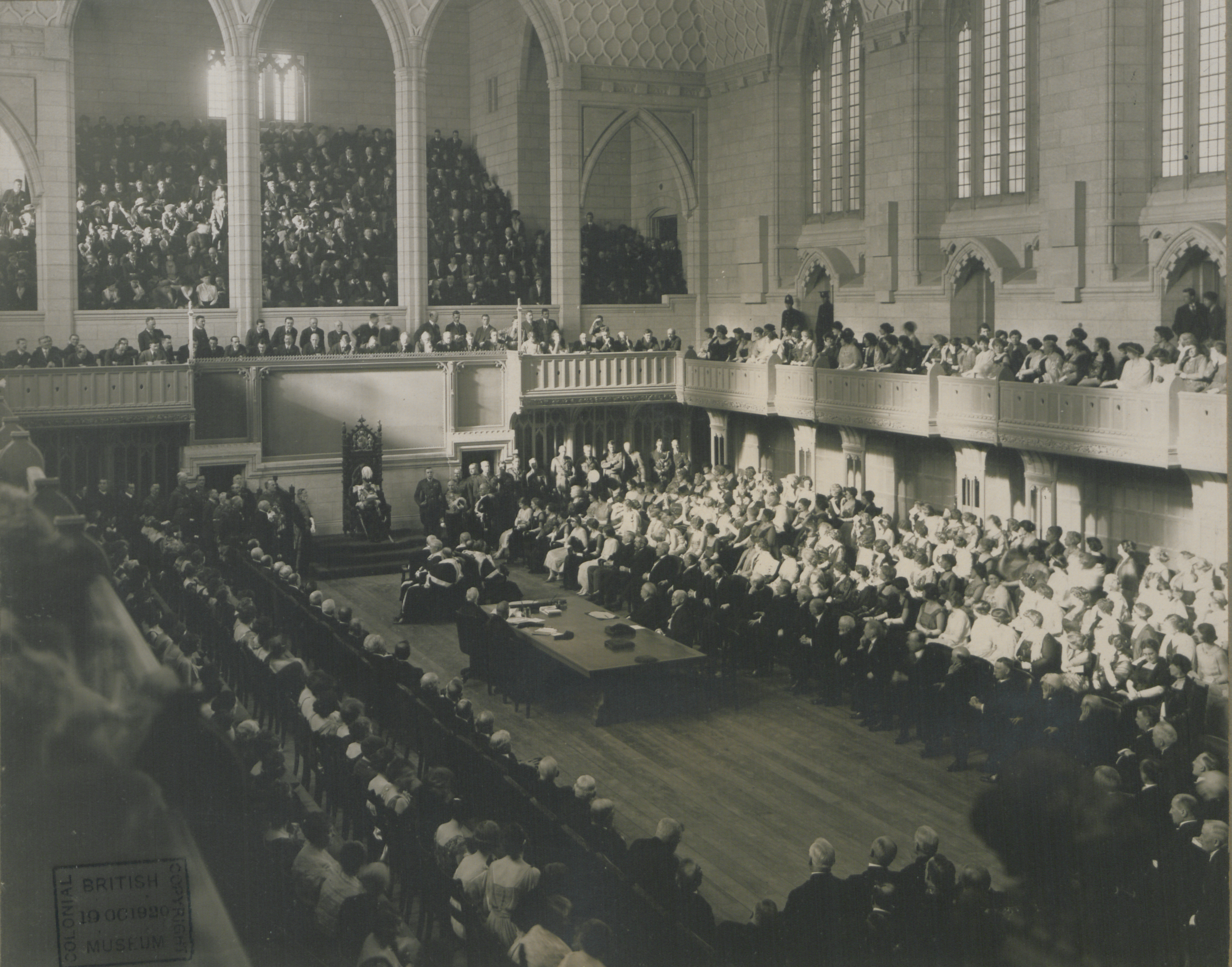
1920 opening of Canadian Parliament

Lists of members of the Canadian House of Commons cover the members elected to the House of Commons of Canada, the lower chamber of the bicameral Parliament of Canada. Seats in the House of Commons are distributed roughly in proportion to the population of each province and territory. The lists of members are organized alphabetically, by age and by parliament.

== Alphabetical ==
- A
- B
- C
- D
- E
- F
- G
- H
- I
- J
- K
- L
- M
- N
- O
- P
- Q
- R
- S
- T
- U
- V
- W
- X
- Y
- Z

== By Parliament ==
- 1st (1867–1872)
- 2nd (1873–1874)
- 3rd (1874–1878)
- 4th (1879–1882)
- 5th (1883–1887)
- 6th (1887–1891)
- 7th (1891–1896)
- 8th (1896–1900)
- 9th (1901–1904)
- 10th (1905–1908)
- 11th (1908–1911)
- 12th (1911–1917)
- 13th (1918–1921)
- 14th (1922–1925)
- 15th (1926)
- 16th (1926–1930)
- 17th (1930–1935)
- 18th (1936–1940)
- 19th (1940–1945)
- 20th (1945–1949)
- 21st (1949–1953)
- 22nd (1953–1957)
- 23rd (1957–1958)
- 24th (1958–1962)
- 25th (1962–1963)
- 26th (1963–1965)
- 27th (1966–1968)
- 28th (1968–1972)
- 29th (1973–1974)
- 30th (1974–1979)
- 31st (1979)
- 32nd (1980–1984)
- 33rd (1984–1988)
- 34th (1988–1993)
- 35th (1994–1997)
- 36th (1997–2000)
- 37th (2001–2004)
- 38th ( 2004–2005)
- 39th (2006–2008)
- 40th (2008–2011)
- 41st (2011–2015)
- 42nd (2015–2019)
- 43rd (2019–2021)
- 44th (2021–2025)
- 45th (since 2025)

== By election of defeat ==
- List of MPs who lost their seat in the 2011 Canadian federal election
- List of MPs who lost their seat in the 2015 Canadian federal election
- List of MPs who lost their seat in the 2019 Canadian federal election
- List of MPs who lost their seat in the 2019 Canadian federal election
- List of MPs who lost their seat in the 2021 Canadian federal election
- List of MPs who lost their seat in the 2025 Canadian federal election

== By office/role in the House ==
- Speakers
- Leaders of the Opposition
- Government House leaders
- Opposition House leaders
- Parliamentary secretaries
