= List of members of the Canadian House of Commons (F) =

== Fa ==
- Samuel Factor b. 1892 first elected in 1930 as Liberal member for Toronto West Centre, Ontario.
- Joseph-Fernand Fafard b. 1882 first elected in 1917 as Laurier Liberal member for L'Islet, Quebec.
- Meili Faille b. 1972 first elected in 2004 as Bloc Québécois member for Vaudreuil—Soulanges, Quebec.
- Robert Fair b. 1891 first elected in 1935 as Social Credit member for Battle River, Alberta.
- Charles Fairbairn b. 1837 first elected in 1890 as Liberal-Conservative member for Victoria South, Ontario.
- John Henry Fairbank b. 1831 first elected in 1882 as Liberal member for Lambton East, Ontario.
- Ellen Fairclough b. 1905 first elected in 1950 as Progressive Conservative member for Hamilton West, Ontario.
- Francis Fairey b. 1887 first elected in 1953 as Liberal member for Victoria, British Columbia.
- George Clark Fairfield b. 1912 first elected in 1957 as Progressive Conservative member for Portage—Neepawa, Manitoba.
- Gordon Fairweather b. 1923 first elected in 1962 as Progressive Conservative member for Royal, New Brunswick.
- Rosemarie Falk b. 1988 first elected in 2017 as Conservative member for Battlefords—Lloydminster, Saskatchewan.
- Ted Falk b. 1960 first elected in 2013 as Conservative member for Provencher, Manitoba.
- Jessica Fancy-Landry first elected in 2025 as Liberal member for South Shore—St. Margarets, Nova Scotia
- Frank Fane b. 1897 first elected in 1958 as Progressive Conservative member for Vegreville, Alberta.
- Bruce Fanjoy first elected in 2025 as Liberal member for Carleton, Ontario.
- Burt Wendell Fansher b. 1880 first elected in 1921 as Progressive member for Lambton East, Ontario.
- William Russell Fansher b. 1876 first elected in 1925 as Progressive member for Last Mountain, Saskatchewan.
- Julian Fantino b. 1942 first elected in 2010 as Conservative member for Vaughan, Ontario.
- Fonse Faour b. 1951 first elected in 1978 as New Democratic Party member for Humber—St. George's—St. Barbe, Newfoundland and Labrador.
- Thomas Farquhar b. 1875 first elected in 1935 as Liberal member for Algoma East, Ontario.
- Donald Farquharson b. 1834 first elected in 1902 as Liberal member for West Queen's, Prince Edward Island.
- Georges Farrah b. 1957 first elected in 2000 as Liberal member for Bonaventure—Gaspé—Îles-de-la-Madeleine—Pabok, Quebec.
- Thomas Farrow b. 1833 first elected in 1872 as Liberal-Conservative member for Huron North, Ontario.
- Ed Fast b. 1955 first elected in 2006 as Conservative member for Abbotsford, British Columbia.
- James Hugh Faulkner b. 1933 first elected in 1965 as Liberal member for Peterborough, Ontario.
- Gaspard Fauteux b. 1898 first elected in 1942 as Liberal member for St. Mary, Quebec.
- William LeBoutillier Fauvel b. 1850 first elected in 1891 as Liberal member for Bonaventure, Quebec.
- Guy Favreau b. 1917 first elected in 1963 as Liberal member for Papineau, Quebec.
- Norman Fawcett b. 1910 first elected in 1965 as New Democratic Party member for Nickel Belt, Ontario.

== Fe ==
- Joseph Featherston b. 1843 first elected in 1891 as Liberal member for Peel, Ontario.
- Douglas Fee b. 1944 first elected in 1988 as Progressive Conservative member for Red Deer, Alberta.
- Louise Feltham b. 1935 first elected in 1988 as Progressive Conservative member for Wild Rose, Alberta.
- Thomas Scott Fennell b. 1928 first elected in 1979 as Progressive Conservative member for Ontario, Ontario.
- Greg Fergus b. 1969 first elected in 2015 as Liberal member for Hull—Aylmer, Quebec.
- Charles Frederick Ferguson b. 1834 first elected in 1874 as Liberal-Conservative member for Leeds North and Grenville North, Ontario.
- Eric Ferguson b. 1930 first elected in 1979 as Progressive Conservative member for Saint John, New Brunswick.
- John Ferguson b. 1839 first elected in 1882 as Conservative member for Welland, Ontario.
- John Ferguson b. 1840 first elected in 1887 as Independent Conservative member for Renfrew South, Ontario.
- Julian Harcourt Ferguson b. 1895 first elected in 1945 as Progressive Conservative member for Simcoe North, Ontario.
- Ralph Ferguson b. 1929 first elected in 1980 as Liberal member for Lambton—Middlesex, Ontario.
- Rork Scott Ferguson b. 1884 first elected in 1935 as Liberal member for Hastings—Peterborough, Ontario.
- Thomas Roberts Ferguson b. 1818 first elected in 1867 as Conservative member for Cardwell, Ontario.
- Charles-Édouard Ferland b. 1892 first elected in 1928 as Liberal member for Joliette, Quebec.
- Marc Ferland b. 1942 first elected in 1984 as Progressive Conservative member for Portneuf, Quebec.
- Michelle Ferreri first elected in 2021 as Conservative member for Peterborough—Kawartha, Ontario.
- Gladstone Mansfield Ferrie b. 1892 first elected in 1949 as Liberal member for Mackenzie, Saskatchewan.
- John Ferris b. 1811 first elected in 1867 as Liberal member for Queen's, New Brunswick.
- J. Émile Ferron b. 1896 first elected in 1935 as Liberal member for Berthier—Maskinongé, Quebec.
- Ron Fewchuk b. 1941 first elected in 1993 as Liberal member for Selkirk—Red River, Manitoba.

== Fi ==
- William Stevens Fielding b. 1848 first elected in 1896 as Liberal member for Shelburne and Queen's, Nova Scotia.
- Gilbert Fillion b. 1940 first elected in 1993 as Bloc Québécois member for Chicoutimi, Quebec.
- Andy Fillmore b. 1966 first elected in 2015 as Liberal member for Halifax, Nova Scotia.
- James Findlay b. 1833 first elected in 1872 as Liberal member for Renfrew North, Ontario.
- John Walter Findlay b. 1866 first elected in 1921 as Progressive member for Bruce South, Ontario.
- Kerry-Lynne Findlay b. 1955 first elected in 2011 as Conservative member for Delta—Richmond East, British Columbia.
- Sheila Finestone b. 1927 first elected in 1984 as Liberal member for Mount Royal, Quebec.
- John Finlay b. 1837 first elected in 1904 as Liberal member for Peterborough East, Ontario.
- John Baird Finlay b. 1929 first elected in 1993 as Liberal member for Oxford, Ontario.
- Duncan Finlayson b. 1867 first elected in 1904 as Liberal member for Richmond, Nova Scotia.
- Albert Ernest Finley b. 1870 first elected in 1917 as Unionist member for Souris, Manitoba.
- Diane Finley b. 1957 first elected in 2004 as Conservative member for Haldimand—Norfolk, Ontario.
- Robert Emmett Finn b. 1877 first elected in 1922 as Liberal member for Halifax, Nova Scotia.
- Pat Finnigan b. 1955 first elected in 2015 as Liberal member for Miramichi—Grand Lake, New Brunswick.
- Walter Firth b. 1935 first elected in 1972 as New Democratic Party member for Northwest Territories, Northwest Territories.
- Eugène Fiset b. 1874 first elected in 1924 as Liberal member for Rimouski, Quebec.
- Jean-Baptiste Romuald Fiset b. 1843 first elected in 1872 as Liberal member for Rimouski, Quebec.
- Albert Fish b. 1922 first elected in 1979 as Progressive Conservative member for Guelph, Ontario.
- Charles Elijah Fish b. 1857 first elected in 1925 as Conservative member for Northumberland, New Brunswick.
- Charles Fisher b. 1808 first elected in 1867 as Liberal member for York, New Brunswick.
- Darren Fisher b. 1965 first elected in 2015 as Liberal member for Dartmouth—Cole Harbour, Nova Scotia.
- Douglas Glenn Fisher b. 1942 first elected in 1980 as Liberal member for Mississauga North, Ontario.
- Douglas Mason Fisher b. 1919 first elected in 1957 as CCF member for Port Arthur, Ontario.
- John Henry Fisher b. 1855 first elected in 1911 as Conservative member for Brant, Ontario.
- Ron Fisher b. 1934 first elected in 1988 as New Democratic Party member for Saskatoon—Dundurn, Saskatchewan.
- Sydney Arthur Fisher b. 1850 first elected in 1882 as Liberal member for Brome, Quebec.
- Brian Fitzpatrick b. 1945 first elected in 2000 as Canadian Alliance member for Prince Albert, Saskatchewan.
- Charles Fitzpatrick b. 1851 first elected in 1896 as Liberal member for Quebec County, Quebec.
- William Fitzsimmons b. 1818 first elected in 1878 as Conservative member for Brockville, Ontario.

== Fl ==
- Jim Flaherty b. 1949 first elected in 2006 as Conservative member for Whitby—Oshawa, Ontario.
- Donald Methuen Fleming b. 1905 first elected in 1945 as Progressive Conservative member for Eglinton, Ontario.
- Gavin Fleming b. 1826 first elected in 1872 as Liberal member for Brant North, Ontario.
- Harry Raymond Fleming b. 1894 first elected in 1935 as Liberal member for Humboldt, Saskatchewan.
- James Fleming b. 1839 first elected in 1882 as Liberal member for Peel, Ontario.
- James Sydney Clark Fleming b. 1939 first elected in 1972 as Liberal member for York West, Ontario.
- Stuart A. Fleming b. 1920 first elected in 1958 as Progressive Conservative member for Okanagan—Revelstoke, British Columbia.
- Hugh John Flemming b. 1899 first elected in 1960 as Progressive Conservative member for Royal, New Brunswick.
- James Kidd Flemming b. 1868 first elected in 1925 as Conservative member for Victoria—Carleton, New Brunswick.
- William Kingston Flesher b. 1825 first elected in 1872 as Conservative member for Grey East, Ontario.
- Steven Fletcher b. 1972 first elected in 2004 as Conservative member for Charleswood—St. James, Manitoba.
- Thomas Barnard Flint b. 1847 first elected in 1891 as Liberal member for Yarmouth, Nova Scotia.
- Jesse Flis b. 1933 first elected in 1979 as Liberal member for Parkdale—High Park, Ontario.
- Edmund Power Flynn b. 1828 first elected in 1874 as Liberal member for Richmond, Nova Scotia.
- Jacques Flynn b. 1915 first elected in 1958 as Progressive Conservative member for Quebec South, Quebec.
- Patrick Flynn b. 1921 first elected in 1974 as Liberal member for Kitchener, Ontario.

== Fol–For ==
- Raymonde Folco b. 1940 first elected in 1997 as Liberal member for Laval West, Quebec.
- Frank Sidney Follwell b. 1910 first elected in 1949 as Liberal member for Hastings South, Ontario.
- Peter Fonseca b. 1966 first elected in 2015 as Liberal member for Mississauga East—Cooksville, Ontario.
- Gabriel Fontaine b. 1940 first elected in 1984 as Progressive Conservative member for Lévis, Quebec.
- Joseph Louis Rosario Fontaine b. 1900 first elected in 1945 as Liberal member for St. Hyacinthe—Bagot, Quebec.
- Joseph-Éloi Fontaine b. 1865 first elected in 1917 as Laurier Liberal member for Hull, Quebec.
- Joseph-Théophile-Adélard Fontaine b. 1891 first elected in 1930 as Liberal member for St. Hyacinthe—Rouville, Quebec.
- Joseph Frank Fontana b. 1950 first elected in 1988 as Liberal member for London East, Ontario.
- Judy Foote b. 1952 first elected in 2008 as Liberal member for Random—Burin—St. George's, Newfoundland and Labrador.
- Francis Gordon Forbes b. 1857 first elected in 1891 as Liberal member for Queens, Nova Scotia.
- James Fraser Forbes b. 1820 first elected in 1867 as Anti-Confederate member for Queens, Nova Scotia.
- Richard Elmer Forbes b. 1894 first elected in 1958 as Progressive Conservative member for Dauphin, Manitoba.
- Yves Forest b. 1921 first elected in 1963 as Liberal member for Stanstead, Quebec.
- Joseph David Rodolphe Forget b. 1861 first elected in 1904 as Conservative member for Charlevoix, Quebec.
- Victor Forget b. 1916 first elected in 1968 as Liberal member for Saint-Michel, Quebec.
- James Moffat Forgie b. 1889 first elected in 1953 as Liberal member for Renfrew North, Ontario.
- Robert Forke b. 1860 first elected in 1921 as Progressive member for Brandon, Manitoba.
- Michael Forrestall b. 1932 first elected in 1965 as Progressive Conservative member for Halifax, Nova Scotia.
- William Forrester b. 1855 first elected in 1921 as Liberal member for Perth South, Ontario.
- Paul Forseth b. 1946 first elected in 1993 as Reform member for New Westminster—Burnaby, British Columbia.
- Edmond Fortier b. 1849 first elected in 1900 as Liberal member for Lotbinière, Quebec.
- Hyacinthe-Adélard Fortier b. 1875 first elected in 1917 as Laurier Liberal member for Labelle, Quebec.
- Moïse Fortier b. 1815 first elected in 1867 as Liberal member for Yamaska, Quebec.
- Mona Fortier b. 1972 first elected in 2017 as Liberal member for Ottawa—Vanier, Ontario.
- André-Gilles Fortin b. 1943 first elected in 1968 as Ralliement Créditiste member for Lotbinière, Quebec.
- Émile Fortin b. 1878 first elected in 1930 as Conservative member for Lévis, Quebec.
- Jean-François Fortin b. 1973 first elected in 2011 as New Democratic Party member for Haute-Gaspésie—La Mitis—Matane—Matapédia, Quebec.
- Louis Fortin b. 1920 first elected in 1958 as Progressive Conservative member for Montmagny—l'Islet, Quebec.
- Pierre Fortin b. 1823 first elected in 1867 as Conservative member for Gaspé, Quebec.
- Rhéal Fortin first elected in 2015 as Bloc Québécois member for Rivière-du-Nord, Quebec
- Thomas Fortin b. 1853 first elected in 1896 as Liberal member for Laval, Quebec.

== Fos–Foy ==
- Albion Roudolph Foster b. 1875 first elected in 1927 as Liberal member for Victoria—Carleton, New Brunswick.
- Arthur de Witt Foster b. 1886 first elected in 1911 as Conservative member for Kings, Nova Scotia.
- George Eulas Foster b. 1847 first elected in 1882 as Conservative member for King's, New Brunswick.
- Maurice Brydon Foster b. 1933 first elected in 1968 as Liberal member for Algoma, Ontario.
- Thomas Foster b. 1852 first elected in 1917 as Unionist member for York East, Ontario.
- Alphonse Fournier b. 1893 first elected in 1930 as Liberal member for Hull, Quebec.
- Charles Alphonse Fournier b. 1871 first elected in 1917 as Laurier Liberal member for Bellechasse, Quebec.
- Edgar E. Fournier b. 1908 first elected in 1961 as Progressive Conservative member for Restigouche—Madawaska, New Brunswick.
- Ghislain Fournier b. 1938 first elected in 1997 as Bloc Québécois member for Manicouagan, Quebec.
- Sarto Fournier b. 1903 first elected in 1935 as Liberal member for Maisonneuve—Rosemont, Quebec.
- Télesphore Fournier b. 1823 first elected in 1870 as Liberal member for Bellechasse, Quebec.
- Frederick Luther Fowke b. 1857 first elected in 1908 as Liberal member for Ontario South, Ontario.
- George William Fowler b. 1859 first elected in 1900 as Conservative member for King's, New Brunswick.
- Francis Fox b. 1939 first elected in 1972 as Liberal member for Argenteuil—Deux-Montagnes, Quebec.
- Walter Frank Foy b. 1908 first elected in 1962 as Liberal member for Lambton West, Ontario.

== Fr ==
- Peter Fragiskatos b. 1981 first elected in 2015 as Liberal member for London North Centre, Ontario.
- Sidney Arthur Fraleigh b. 1931 first elected in 1979 as Progressive Conservative member for Lambton—Middlesex, Ontario.
- Cyril Lloyd Francis b. 1920 first elected in 1963 as Liberal member for Carleton, Ontario.
- Joseph Napoléon Francoeur b. 1880 first elected in 1937 as Liberal member for Lotbinière, Quebec.
- William Charles Frank b. 1923 first elected in 1972 as Progressive Conservative member for Middlesex, Ontario.
- Allan MacPherson Fraser b. 1906 first elected in 1953 as Liberal member for St. John's East, Newfoundland and Labrador.
- Austin Levi Fraser b. 1868 first elected in 1908 as Conservative member for King's, Prince Edward Island.
- Colin Fraser b. 1978 first elected in 2015 as Liberal member for West Nova, Nova Scotia.
- Duncan Cameron Fraser b. 1845 first elected in 1891 as Liberal member for Guysborough, Nova Scotia.
- Evan Eugene Fraser b. 1865 first elected in 1917 as Unionist member for Welland, Ontario.
- Gordon Knapman Fraser b. 1891 first elected in 1940 as National Government member for Peterborough West, Ontario.
- James Harshaw Fraser b. 1841 first elected in 1875 as Liberal-Conservative member for London, Ontario.
- John Fraser b. 1849 first elected in 1896 as Liberal member for Lambton East, Ontario.
- John Allen Fraser b. 1931 first elected in 1972 as Progressive Conservative member for Vancouver South, British Columbia.
- John Anderson Fraser b. 1866 first elected in 1925 as Conservative member for Cariboo, British Columbia.
- Sean Fraser b. 1984 first elected in 2015 as Liberal member for Central Nova, Nova Scotia.
- William Alexander Fraser (politician) b. 1886 first elected in 1930 as Liberal member for Northumberland, Ontario.
- John L. Frazer b. 1931 first elected in 1993 as Reform member for Saanich—Gulf Islands, British Columbia.
- Antoine Fréchette b. 1905 first elected in 1958 as Progressive Conservative member for Témiscouata, Quebec.
- Louis Honoré Fréchette b. 1839 first elected in 1874 as Liberal member for Lévis, Quebec.
- Louis-Israël Côté alias Fréchette b. 1848 first elected in 1882 as Conservative member for Mégantic, Quebec.
- Chrystia Freeland b. 1968 first elected in 2013 as Liberal member for Toronto Centre, Ontario.
- Carole Freeman b. 1949 first elected in 2006 as Bloc Québécois member for Châteauguay—Saint-Constant, Quebec.
- Joshua Newton Freeman b. 1816 first elected in 1887 as Liberal-Conservative member for Queens, Nova Scotia.
- Mylène Freeman b. 1989 first elected in 2011 as New Democratic Party member for Argenteuil—Papineau—Mirabel, Quebec.
- Jules Joseph Taschereau Frémont b. 1855 first elected in 1891 as Liberal member for Quebec County, Quebec.
- Jean-Louis Frenette b. 1920 first elected in 1962 as Social Credit member for Portneuf, Quebec.
- Claude Girven Fretz b. 1927 first elected in 1979 as Progressive Conservative member for Erie, Ontario.
- Benno Friesen b. 1929 first elected in 1974 as Progressive Conservative member for Surrey—White Rock, British Columbia.
- Alfred Ernest Fripp b. 1866 first elected in 1911 as Conservative member for City of Ottawa, Ontario.
- Douglas Cockburn Frith b. 1945 first elected in 1980 as Liberal member for Sudbury, Ontario.
- Jake Froese b. 1925 first elected in 1979 as Progressive Conservative member for Niagara Falls, Ontario.
- Francis Theodore Frost b. 1843 first elected in 1896 as Liberal member for Leeds North and Grenville North, Ontario.
- Liza Frulla b. 1949 first elected in 2002 as Liberal member for Verdun—Saint-Henri—Saint-Paul—Pointe Saint-Charles, Quebec.
- Hedy Fry b. 1941 first elected in 1993 as Liberal member for Vancouver Centre, British Columbia.

== Fu ==
- Stephen Fuhr b. 1969 first elected in 2015 as Liberal member for Kelowna—Lake Country, British Columbia.
- George Taylor Fulford b. 1902 first elected in 1940 as Liberal member for Leeds, Ontario.
- Edmund Davie Fulton b. 1916 first elected in 1945 as Progressive Conservative member for Kamloops, British Columbia.
- Frederick John Fulton b. 1862 first elected in 1917 as Unionist member for Cariboo, British Columbia.
- James Ross Fulton b. 1950 first elected in 1979 as New Democratic Party member for Skeena, British Columbia.
- Oscar Fulton b. 1843 first elected in 1878 as Liberal-Conservative member for Stormont, Ontario.
- Ray Funk b. 1948 first elected in 1988 as New Democratic Party member for Prince Albert—Churchill River, Saskatchewan.
- Stephen Joseph Furniss b. 1875 first elected in 1935 as Liberal member for Muskoka—Ontario, Ontario.
