= List of members of the Canadian House of Commons (V) =

== Va ==
- William Berrian Vail b. 1823 first elected in 1874 as Liberal member for Digby, Nova Scotia.
- Cyrille Émile Vaillancourt b. 1848 first elected in 1891 as Nationalist member for Dorchester, Quebec.
- Georges-J. Valade b. 1922 first elected in 1958 as Progressive Conservative member for Sainte-Marie, Quebec.
- Bernard Valcourt b. 1952 first elected in 1984 as Progressive Conservative member for Madawaska—Victoria, New Brunswick.
- Rechie Valdez b. 1980 first elected in 2021 as Liberal member for Mississauga—Streetsville, Ontario.
- Tony Valeri b. 1957 first elected in 1993 as Liberal member for Lincoln, Ontario.
- Frank Valeriote b. 1954 first elected in 2008 as Liberal member for Guelph, Ontario.
- Pierre Vincent Valin b. 1827 first elected in 1878 as Conservative member for Montmorency, Quebec.
- John Vallance b. 1883 first elected in 1925 as Liberal member for South Battleford, Saskatchewan.
- Roch Pamphile Vallée b. 1848 first elected in 1878 as Conservative member for Portneuf, Quebec.
- Roger Valley b. 1957 first elected in 2004 as Liberal member for Kenora, Ontario.
- Philippe Valois b. 1907 first elected in 1949 as Liberal member for Argenteuil—Deux-Montagnes, Quebec.
- Tony Van Bynen b. 1950 first elected in 2019 as Liberal member for Newmarket—Aurora, Ontario.
- Walter Van De Walle b. 1922 first elected in 1986 as Progressive Conservative member for Pembina, Alberta.
- Joseph Charles Van Horne b. 1921 first elected in 1955 as Progressive Conservative member for Restigouche—Madawaska, New Brunswick.
- Adam van Koeverden b. 1982 first elected in 2019 as Liberal member for Halton, Ontario.
- Peter Van Loan b. 1963 first elected in 2004 as Conservative member for York—Simcoe, Ontario.
- Dave Van Kesteren b. 1955 first elected in 2006 as Conservative member for Chatham-Kent—Essex, Ontario.
- Tako Van Popta b. 1953 first elected in 2019 as Conservative member for Langley—Aldergrove, British Columbia.
- Fabien Vanasse b. 1850 first elected in 1879 as Conservative member for Yamaska, Quebec.
- Lyle Vanclief b. 1943 first elected in 1988 as Liberal member for Prince Edward—Hastings, Ontario.
- Dan Vandal b. 1960 first elected in 2015 as Liberal member for Saint Boniface—Saint Vital, Manitoba.
- Anita Vandenbeld b. 1971 first elected in 2015 as Liberal member for Ottawa West—Nepean, Ontario.
- William John Vankoughnet b. 1943 first elected in 1979 as Progressive Conservative member for Hastings—Frontenac, Ontario.
- Adam Vaughan b. 1961 first elected in 2014 as Liberal member for Trinity—Spadina, Ontario.
- Angela Vautour b. 1960 first elected in 1997 as New Democratic Party member for Beauséjour—Petitcodiac, New Brunswick.

== Ve ==
- Karen Vecchio b. 1971 first elected in 2015 as Conservative member for Elgin—Middlesex—London, Ontario.
- Michel Veillette b. 1939 first elected in 1979 as Liberal member for Champlain, Quebec.
- Maurice Vellacott b. 1955 first elected in 1997 as Reform member for Wanuskewin, Saskatchewan.
- Clarence Joseph Veniot b. 1886 first elected in 1936 as Liberal member for Gloucester, New Brunswick.
- Peter John Veniot b. 1863 first elected in 1926 as Liberal member for Gloucester, New Brunswick.
- Pierrette Venne b. 1945 first elected in 1988 as Progressive Conservative member for Saint-Hubert, Quebec.
- Josée Verner b. 1959 first elected in 2006 as Conservative member for Louis-Saint-Laurent, Quebec.
- Harry Verran b. 1930 first elected in 1993 as Liberal member for South West Nova, Nova Scotia.
- Alphonse Verville b. 1864 first elected in 1906 as Labour member for Maisonneuve, Quebec.
- Joseph-Achille Verville b. 1887 first elected in 1925 as Liberal member for Lotbinière, Quebec.
- Monique Vézina b. 1935 first elected in 1984 as Progressive Conservative member for Rimouski—Témiscouata, Quebec.

== Vi ==
- Fernand Viau b. 1909 first elected in 1945 as Liberal member for St. Boniface, Manitoba.
- Gary Vidal b. 1965 first elected in 2019 as Conservative member for Desnethé—Missinippi—Churchill River, Saskatchewan.
- Dominique Vien b. 1967 first elected in 2021 as Conservative member for Bellechasse—Les Etchemins—Lévis, Quebec.
- Jacques Vien b. 1932 first elected in 1988 as Progressive Conservative member for Laurentides, Quebec.
- Thomas Vien b. 1881 first elected in 1917 as Laurier Liberal member for Lotbinière, Quebec.
- Arnold Viersen b. 1986 first elected in 2015 as Conservative member for Peace River—Westlock, Alberta.
- Julie Vignola first elected in 2019 as Bloc Québécois member for Beauport—Limoilou, Quebec.
- René Villemure first elected in 2021 as Bloc Québécois member for Trois-Rivières, Quebec.
- Georges Villeneuve b. 1922 first elected in 1953 as Liberal member for Roberval, Quebec.
- Louis Villeneuve first elected in 2025 as Liberal member for Brome—Missisquoi, Quebec.
- Osie Villeneuve b. 1906 first elected in 1957 as Progressive Conservative member for Glengarry—Prescott, Ontario.
- Auguste Vincent b. 1915 first elected in 1953 as Liberal member for Longueuil, Quebec.
- Clément Vincent b. 1931 first elected in 1962 as Progressive Conservative member for Nicolet—Yamaska, Quebec.
- Pierre H. Vincent b. 1955 first elected in 1984 as Progressive Conservative member for Trois-Rivières, Quebec.
- Robert Vincent b. 1956 first elected in 2004 as Bloc Québécois member for Shefford, Quebec.
- Arif Virani b. 1973 first elected in 2015 as Liberal member for Parkdale—High Park, Ontario.
- Brad Vis b. 1984 first elected in 2019 as Conservative member for Mission—Matsqui—Fraser Canyon, British Columbia.
- Reginald Percy Vivian b. 1902 first elected in 1957 as Progressive Conservative member for Durham, Ontario.

== Vo ==
- Joseph Volpe b. 1947 first elected in 1988 as Liberal member for Eglinton—Lawrence, Ontario.

== Vr ==
- Adam Edward Vrooman b. 1847 first elected in 1900 as Conservative member for Victoria South, Ontario.

== Vu ==
- Kevin Vuong first elected in 2021 as Liberal member for Spadina—Fort York, Ontario.
