= List of members of the Canadian House of Commons (J) =

== Ja ==
- Harry Jackman b. 1900 first elected in 1940 as National Government member for Rosedale, Ontario.
- George Jackson b. 1808 first elected in 1867 as Conservative member for Grey South, Ontario.
- Grant Jackson b. 1997 first elected in 2025 as Conservative member for Brandon—Souris, Manitoba
- Joseph Jackson b. 1831 first elected in 1882 as Liberal member for Norfolk South, Ontario.
- Ovid Jackson b. 1939 first elected in 1993 as Liberal member for Bruce—Grey, Ontario.
- Samuel Jacob Jackson b. 1848 first elected in 1904 as Liberal member for Selkirk, Manitoba.
- William Jackson b. 1858 first elected in 1904 as Conservative member for Elgin West, Ontario.
- Jean-Marc Jacob b. 1947 first elected in 1993 as Bloc Québécois member for Charlesbourg, Quebec.
- Pierre Jacob b. 1953 first elected in 2011 as New Democratic Party member for Brome—Missisquoi, Quebec.
- Samuel William Jacobs b. 1871 first elected in 1917 as Laurier Liberal member for George-Étienne Cartier, Quebec.
- Carole Jacques b. 1960 first elected in 1984 as Progressive Conservative member for Montreal—Mercier, Quebec.
- Helena Jaczek b. 1950 first elected in 2019 as Liberal member for Markham—Stouffville, Ontario.
- Frank Eric Jaenicke b. 1892 first elected in 1945 as Cooperative Commonwealth Federation member for Kindersley, Saskatchewan.
- Rahim Jaffer b. 1971 first elected in 1997 as Reform member for Edmonton—Strathcona, Alberta.
- John Mason James b. 1911 first elected in 1949 as Liberal member for Durham, Ontario.
- Kenneth Albert James b. 1934 first elected in 1984 as Progressive Conservative member for Sarnia—Lambton, Ontario.
- Roxanne James b. 1966 first elected in 2011 as Conservative member for Scarborough Centre, Ontario.
- Clarence Jameson b. 1872 first elected in 1908 as Conservative member for Digby, Nova Scotia.
- Richard Willis Jameson b. 1851 first elected in 1897 as Liberal member for Winnipeg, Manitoba.
- Donald Campbell Jamieson b. 1921 first elected in 1966 as Liberal member for Burin—Burgeo, Newfoundland and Labrador.
- Joseph Jamieson b. 1839 first elected in 1882 as Conservative member for Lanark North, Ontario.
- Richard Janelle b. 1947 first elected in 1978 as Social Credit member for Lotbinière, Quebec.
- Tamara Jansen first elected in 2019 as Conservative member for Cloverdale—Langley City, British Columbia.
- Norman Jaques b. 1880 first elected in 1935 as Social Credit member for Wetaskiwin, Alberta.
- Bud Jardine b. 1935 first elected in 1984 as Progressive Conservative member for Northumberland—Miramichi, New Brunswick.
- Robert Jarvis b. 1936 first elected in 1979 as Progressive Conservative member for Willowdale, Ontario.
- William Herbert Jarvis b. 1930 first elected in 1972 as Progressive Conservative member for Perth—Wilmot, Ontario.

== Je ==
- Brian Jean b. 1963 first elected in 2004 as Conservative member for Athabasca, Alberta.
- Joseph Jean b. 1890 first elected in 1932 as Liberal member for Maisonneuve, Quebec.
- Hormidas Jeannotte b. 1843 first elected in 1892 as Conservative member for L'Assomption, Quebec.
- Alex Jeffery b. 1909 first elected in 1949 as Liberal member for London, Ontario.
- Otto Jelinek b. 1940 first elected in 1972 as Progressive Conservative member for High Park—Humber Valley, Ontario.
- Lincoln Henry Jelliff b. 1865 first elected in 1921 as Progressive member for Lethbridge, Alberta.
- Matt Jeneroux b. 1981 first elected in 2015 as Conservative member for Edmonton Riverbend, Alberta.
- John Theophilus Jenkins b. 1829 first elected in 1882 as Liberal-Conservative member for Queen's County, Prince Edward Island.
- Robert Harold Jenkins b. 1873 first elected in 1925 as Liberal member for Queen's, Prince Edward Island.
- Daphne Jennings b. 1939 first elected in 1993 as Reform member for Mission—Coquitlam, British Columbia.
- Marlene Jennings b. 1951 first elected in 1997 as Liberal member for Notre-Dame-de-Grâce—Lachine, Quebec.
- James Kenneth Jepson b. 1942 first elected in 1984 as Progressive Conservative member for London East, Ontario.
- James Jerome b. 1933 first elected in 1968 as Liberal member for Sudbury, Ontario.
- Louis Amable Jetté b. 1836 first elected in 1872 as Liberal member for Montreal East, Quebec.
- Pauline Jewett b. 1922 first elected in 1963 as Liberal member for Northumberland, Ontario.

== Ji ==
- Jamil Jivani b. 1987 first elected in 2024 as Conservative member for Durham, Ontario

== Job–Joh ==
- Christian Jobin b. 1952 first elected in 2003 as Liberal member for Lévis-et-Chutes-de-la-Chaudière, Quebec.
- Amable Jodoin b. 1828 first elected in 1874 as Liberal member for Chambly, Quebec.
- Gord Johns b. 1969 first elected in 2015 as New Democratic Party member for Courtenay—Alberni, British Columbia.
- Al Johnson b. 1939 first elected in 1988 as Progressive Conservative member for Calgary North, Alberta.
- John Mercer Johnson b. 1818 first elected in 1867 as Liberal member for Northumberland, New Brunswick.
- Morrissey Johnson b. 1932 first elected in 1984 as Progressive Conservative member for Bonavista—Trinity—Conception, Newfoundland and Labrador.
- Paul Léo Maurice Johnson b. 1929 first elected in 1958 as Progressive Conservative member for Chambly—Rouville, Quebec.
- Robert Milton Johnson b. 1879 first elected in 1921 as Progressive member for Moose Jaw, Saskatchewan.
- Merv Johnson b. 1923 first elected in 1953 as Cooperative Commonwealth Federation member for Kindersley, Saskatchewan.
- Alexander Johnston b. 1867 first elected in 1900 as Liberal member for Cape Breton, Nova Scotia.
- Charles Edward Johnston b. 1899 first elected in 1935 as Social Credit member for Bow River, Alberta.
- Donald James Johnston b. 1936 first elected in 1978 as Liberal member for Westmount, Quebec.
- Dale Johnston b. 1941 first elected in 1993 as Reform member for Wetaskiwin, Alberta.
- Howard Earl Johnston b. 1928 first elected in 1965 as Social Credit member for Okanagan—Revelstoke, British Columbia.
- John Frederick Johnston b. 1876 first elected in 1917 as Unionist member for Last Mountain, Saskatchewan.
- Allan Johnston b. 1904 first elected in 1940 as Liberal member for London, Ontario.
- Robert Johnston b. 1856 first elected in 1900 as Conservative member for Cardwell, Ontario.
- Thomas George Johnston b. 1849 first elected in 1898 as Liberal member for Lambton West, Ontario.
- Lewis Wilkieson Johnstone b. 1862 first elected in 1925 as Conservative member for Cape Breton North—Victoria, Nova Scotia.

== Jol–Joy ==
- Georgina Jolibois b. 1968 first elected in 2015 as New Democratic Party member for Desnethé—Missinippi—Churchill River, Saskatchewan.
- Mélanie Joly b. 1979 first elected in 2015 as Liberal member for Ahuntsic-Cartierville (electoral district), Quebec.
- Henri-Gustave Joly de Lotbinière b. 1829 first elected in 1867 as Liberal member for Lotbinière, Quebec.
- Jean-Luc Joncas b. 1936 first elected in 1984 as Progressive Conservative member for Matapédia—Matane, Quebec.
- Louis Zéphirin Joncas b. 1846 first elected in 1887 as Conservative member for Gaspé, Quebec.
- Alfred Gilpin Jones b. 1824 first elected in 1867 as Anti-Confederate member for Halifax, Nova Scotia.
- David Ford Jones b. 1818 first elected in 1874 as Conservative member for Leeds South, Ontario.
- Eloise Jones b. 1917 first elected in 1964 as Progressive Conservative member for Saskatoon, Saskatchewan.
- Francis Jones b. 1815 first elected in 1867 as Conservative member for Leeds North and Grenville North, Ontario.
- George Burpee Jones b. 1866 first elected in 1921 as Conservative member for Royal, New Brunswick.
- Henry Frank Jones b. 1920 first elected in 1957 as Progressive Conservative member for Saskatoon, Saskatchewan.
- Herbert Ladd Jones b. 1858 first elected in 1887 as Conservative member for Digby, Nova Scotia.
- Jim Jones b. 1943 first elected in 1997 as Progressive Conservative member for Markham, Ontario.
- Leonard C. Jones b. 1924 first elected in 1974 as Independent member for Moncton, New Brunswick.
- Owen Lewis Jones b. 1890 first elected in 1948 as Cooperative Commonwealth Federation member for Yale, British Columbia.
- Yvonne Jones b. 1968 first elected in 2013 as Liberal member for Labrador, Newfoundland and Labrador.
- Bernadette Jordan b. 1963 first elected in 2015 as Liberal member for South Shore—St. Margaret's, Nova Scotia.
- Jim Jordan b. 1928 first elected in 1988 as Liberal member for Leeds—Grenville, Ontario.
- Joe Jordan b. 1958 first elected in 1997 as Liberal member for Leeds—Grenville, Ontario.
- Warner Herbert Jorgenson b. 1918 first elected in 1957 as Progressive Conservative member for Provencher, Manitoba.
- Natilien Joseph first elected in 2025 as Liberal member for Longueuil—Saint-Hubert, Quebec.
- Fernand Jourdenais b. 1933 first elected in 1984 as Progressive Conservative member for La Prairie, Quebec.
- Majid Jowhari b. 1960 first elected in 2015 as Liberal member for Richmond Hill, Ontario.
- Serge Joyal b. 1945 first elected in 1974 as Liberal member for Maisonneuve—Rosemont, Quebec.

== Ju ==
- Peter Julian b. 1962 first elected in 2004 as New Democratic Party member for Burnaby—New Westminster, British Columbia.
- Douglas Jung b. 1925 first elected in 1957 as Progressive Conservative member for Vancouver Centre, British Columbia.
- Alex Jupp b. 1927 first elected in 1979 as Progressive Conservative member for Mississauga North, Ontario.
- René Jutras b. 1913 first elected in 1940 as Liberal member for Provencher, Manitoba.
