= List of members of the Canadian House of Commons (O) =

== O' ==
- Joseph Leonard O'Brien b. 1895 first elected in 1940 as National Government member for Northumberland, New Brunswick.
- Lawrence D. O'Brien b. 1951 first elected in 1996 as Liberal member for Labrador, Newfoundland and Labrador.
- Pat O'Brien b. 1948 first elected in 1993 as Liberal member for London—Middlesex, Ontario.
- William Edward O'Brien b. 1831 first elected in 1882 as Conservative member for Muskoka and Parry Sound, Ontario.
- Jennifer O'Connell b. 1983 first elected in 2015 as Liberal member for Pickering—Uxbridge, Ontario.
- Martin Patrick O'Connell b. 1916 first elected in 1968 as Liberal member for Scarborough East, Ontario.
- Dennis James O'Connor b. 1886 first elected in 1930 as Liberal member for Châteauguay—Huntingdon, Quebec.
- Gordon O'Connor b. 1939 first elected in 2004 as Conservative member for Carleton—Lanark, Ontario.
- John O'Connor b. 1824 first elected in 1867 as Conservative member for Essex, Ontario.
- Terrance Patrick O'Connor b. 1940 first elected in 1972 as Progressive Conservative member for Halton, Ontario.
- John O'Donohoe b. 1824 first elected in 1874 as Liberal-Conservative member for Toronto East, Ontario.
- Raymond Joseph Michael O'Hurley b. 1909 first elected in 1957 as Progressive Conservative member for Lotbinière, Quebec.
- Joseph Phillip O'Keefe b. 1909 first elected in 1963 as Liberal member for St. John's East, Newfoundland and Labrador.
- Brian Alexander O'Kurley b. 1953 first elected in 1988 as Progressive Conservative member for Elk Island, Alberta.
- Clement Augustine O'Leary b. 1916 first elected in 1958 as Progressive Conservative member for Antigonish—Guysborough, Nova Scotia.
- Lawrence O'Neil b. 1954 first elected in 1984 as Progressive Conservative member for Cape Breton Highlands—Canso, Nova Scotia.
- John Raymond O'Neill b. 1891 first elected in 1925 as Conservative member for Timiskaming North, Ontario.
- Thomas James O'Neill b. 1882 first elected in 1935 as Liberal member for Kamloops, British Columbia.
- Tilly O'Neill-Gordon b. 1949 first elected in 2008 as Conservative member for Miramichi, New Brunswick.
- Seamus O'Regan b. 1971 first elected in 2015 as Liberal member for St. John's South—Mount Pearl, Newfoundland and Labrador.
- James O'Reilly b. 1823 first elected in 1872 as Liberal-Conservative member for Renfrew South, Ontario.
- John Francis O'Reilly b. 1940 first elected in 1993 as Liberal member for Victoria—Haliburton, Ontario.
- Dominique O'Rourke first elected in 2025 as Liberal member for Guelph, Ontario.
- Sean Patrick O'Sullivan b. 1952 first elected in 1972 as Progressive Conservative member for Hamilton—Wentworth, Ontario.
- Erin O'Toole b. 1973 first elected in 2012 as Conservative member for Durham, Ontario.

== Oa ==
- Edwin Randolph Oakes b. 1818 first elected in 1874 as Liberal-Conservative member for Digby, Nova Scotia.

== Ob ==
- Frank Oberle b. 1932 first elected in 1972 as Progressive Conservative member for Prince George—Peace River, British Columbia.
- Deepak Obhrai b. 1950 first elected in 1997 as Reform member for Calgary East, Alberta.

== Od ==
- Bev Oda b. 1944 first elected in 2004 as Conservative member for Clarington—Scugog—Uxbridge, Ontario.
- Edmond George Odette b. 1884 first elected in 1926 as Liberal member for Essex East, Ontario.

== Og ==
- Alfred Ogden b. 1843 first elected in 1878 as Conservative member for Guysborough, Nova Scotia.
- Robert Joseph Ogle b. 1928 first elected in 1979 as New Democratic Party member for Saskatoon East, Saskatchewan.

== Ol ==
- Harry Olaussen b. 1929 first elected in 1972 as New Democratic Party member for Coast Chilcotin, British Columbia.
- Rob Oliphant b. 1956 first elected in 2008 as Liberal member for Don Valley West, Ontario.
- Frank Oliver b. 1853 first elected in 1896 as Liberal member for Provisional District of Alberta, Northwest Territories.
- Joe Oliver b. 1940 first elected in 2011 as Conservative member for Eglinton—Lawrence, Ontario.
- John Oliver b. 1956 first elected in 2015 as Liberal member for Oakville, Ontario.
- Thomas Oliver b. 1821 first elected in 1867 as Liberal member for Oxford North, Ontario.
- Joseph Mario Jacques Olivier b. 1944 first elected in 1972 as Liberal member for Longueuil, Quebec.
- Louis Ephrem Olivier b. 1848 first elected in 1878 as Liberal member for Mégantic, Quebec.
- Horace Andrew Olson b. 1925 first elected in 1957 as Social Credit member for Medicine Hat, Alberta.
- Eleanor Olszewski first elected in 2025 as Liberal member for Edmonton Centre, Alberta.

== Oo ==
- John Oostrom b. 1930 first elected in 1984 as Progressive Conservative member for Willowdale, Ontario.

== Op ==
- Ted Opitz b. 1961 first elected in 2011 as Conservative member for Etobicoke Centre, Ontario.

== Or ==
- Robert Orange b. 1926 first elected in 1965 as Liberal member for Northwest Territories, Northwest Territories.
- David Orlikow b. 1918 first elected in 1962 as New Democratic Party member for Winnipeg North, Manitoba.
- James Norris Ormiston b. 1915 first elected in 1958 as Progressive Conservative member for Melville, Saskatchewan.
- George Turner Orton b. 1837 first elected in 1874 as Liberal-Conservative member for Wellington Centre, Ontario.

== Os ==
- Tom Osborne b. 1964 first elected in 2025 as Liberal member for Cape Spear, Newfoundland and Labrador
- Edmund Boyd Osler b. 1845 first elected in 1896 as Conservative member for West Toronto, Ontario.
- Edmund Boyd Osler b. 1919 first elected in 1968 as Liberal member for Winnipeg South Centre, Manitoba.
- Marcel Ostiguy b. 1929 first elected in 1978 as Liberal member for Saint-Hyacinthe, Quebec.

== Ot ==
- Steven Otto b. 1921 first elected in 1962 as Liberal member for York East, Ontario.

== Ou ==
- André Ouellet b. 1939 first elected in 1967 as Liberal member for Papineau, Quebec.
- Christian Ouellet b. 1934 first elected in 2006 as Bloc Québécois member for Brome—Missisquoi, Quebec.
- David Ouellet b. 1908 first elected in 1962 as Social Credit member for Drummond—Arthabaska, Quebec.
- Gérard Ouellet b. 1913 first elected in 1963 as Social Credit member for Rimouski, Quebec.
- Robert-Falcon Ouellette b. 1976 first elected in 2015 as Liberal member for Winnipeg Centre, Manitoba.
- Joseph-Aldric Ouimet b. 1848 first elected in 1873 as Liberal-Conservative member for Laval, Quebec.
- Joseph-Rodolphe Ouimet b. 1878 first elected in 1922 as Liberal member for Vaudreuil—Soulanges, Quebec.

== Ow ==
- Charles Lewis Owen b. 1852 first elected in 1907 as Conservative member for Northumberland East, Ontario.
- Stephen Owen b. 1948 first elected in 2000 as Liberal member for Vancouver Quadra, British Columbia.
