= Joseph-Napoléon Francoeur =

Canadian politician

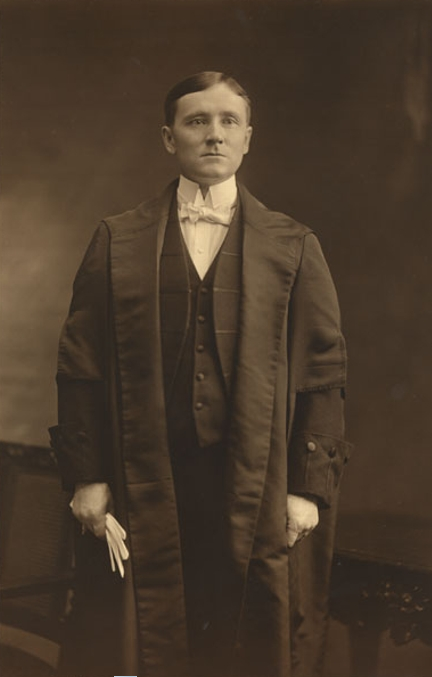

Member of the Canadian Parliament for Lotbinière
- In office 1937–1940
- Preceded by: Joseph-Achille Verville
- Succeeded by: Hugues Lapointe

Member of the Legislative Assembly of Quebec for Lotbinière
- In office 1908–1936
- Preceded by: Napoleon Lemay
- Succeeded by: Maurice Pelletier

17th Speaker of the Legislative Assembly
- In office 1919–1928
- Preceded by: Antonin Galipeault
- Succeeded by: Hector Laferté

Personal details
- Born: 13 December 1880 Cap-Saint-Ignace, Quebec, Canada
- Died: 25 July 1965 (aged 84) Quebec City, Quebec, Canada
- Party: Liberal
- Relations: Joseph-Achille Francoeur, brother
- Cabinet: Minister of Public Works and Labour (1930-1931); Minister of Public Works (1931-1936); Minister of Labour (1935-1936); Minister of Mines (1935-1936)

Joseph-Napoléon Francoeur (French pronunciation: [ʒozɛf napɔleɔ̃ fʁɑ̃kœʁ]; 13 December 1880 – 25 July 1965) was a lawyer, judge and political figure in Quebec. He represented Lotbinière in the Legislative Assembly of Quebec from 1908 to 1936 and Lotbinière in the House of Commons of Canada from 1937 to 1940 as a Liberal. Francoeur was Speaker of the Legislative Assembly from 1919 to 1928.

He was born in Cap-Saint-Ignace, Quebec, the son of Auguste Francoeur and Avila Caron, and was educated at the Séminaire de Québec and the Université Laval. He was admitted to the Quebec bar in 1904 and set up practice in Quebec City. Francoeur practised in partnership with Philippe-Auguste Choquette, Antonin Galipeault and Thomas Vien, among others. In 1913, he was named King's Counsel.

He ran unsuccessfully for a seat in the Quebec assembly in 1904 before being elected in 1908. In 1918, he prepared the Francœur Motion in response to anti-Quebec sentiment following the conscription crisis during World War I. Francoeur served in the provincial cabinet as Minister of Public Works and Labour from 1930 to 1931, as Minister of Public Works from 1931 to 1936 and as Minister of Mines and Minister of Labour from 1935 to 1936. He was defeated when he ran for reelection to the provincial assembly in 1936.

Francoeur was elected to the House of Commons in a 1937 by-election held following the death of Joseph-Achille Verville. He resigned his seat in 1940 after he was named judge in the Court of King's Bench, serving until 1945. He died in Quebec City at the age of 84.

His brother Joseph-Achille also served in the Quebec assembly.
