= Odina Desrochers =

Canadian politician

Odina Desrochers (born May 25, 1951 in Joly, Quebec) is a Canadian politician. He was a member of the Bloc Québécois in the House of Commons of Canada. He was first elected to the house in the 1997 Canadian federal election from the riding of Lotbinière. He was re-elected in the 2000 Canadian federal election in the riding of Lotbinière—L'Érable and again in the 2004 Canadian federal election from the riding of Lotbinière—Chutes-de-la-Chaudière. Desrochers served as the Bloc's critic on issues concerning Latin America and Africa, and was also the critic for Regional Development, Rural Development, Public Accounts, the Treasury Board, and Infrastructure. Desrochers was defeated in the 2006 election by Conservative farmer Jacques Gourde.

Before his election to the House of Commons, he worked as a journalist.

2000 Canadian federal election: Lotbinière—L'Érable
Party	Candidate	Votes
Bloc Québécois	Odina Desrochers	15,351
Liberal	Luc Dastous	12,563
Alliance	Pierre Allard	2,827
Progressive Conservative	Jean Landry	2,357
New Democratic	Dominique Vaillancourt	538

Preceded by Jean Landry, Bloc Québécois	Member of Parliament for Lotbinière—L'Érable; 1997-2004	Succeeded by Electoral district abolished in 2003
Preceded by Electoral district created in 2003	Member of Parliament for Lotbinière—Chutes-de-la-Chaudière; 2004-2006	Succeeded by Jacques Gourde, Conservative
