= Jean Landry (politician) =

Canadian politician (born 1948)

Member of Parliament for Lotbinière
- In office October 25, 1993 – June 2, 1997
- Preceded by: Maurice Tremblay
- Succeeded by: Odina Desrochers

Personal details
- Born: 3 October 1948 (age 77) Saint-Valère, Quebec, Canada
- Party: People's Party of Canada (since 2021)
- Other political affiliations: Bloc Québécois (until 2021)
- Profession: photographer, food preparation

Jean Landry (born 3 October 1948 in Saint-Valère, Quebec) was a member of the House of Commons of Canada from 1993 to 1997. His career has included photography and food preparation.

He was elected in the Lotbinière electoral district under the Bloc Québécois party in the 1993 federal election, thus he served in the 35th Canadian Parliament. In Parliament, he questioned the government's policies on subsidies for dairy farmers. Upon the creation of the Canada Health and Social Transfer, Landry referred to it as "one of the worst incursions of federalism into provincial jurisdiction".

During the 1997 federal election, he faced a contested nominating convention within the BQ. Landry described himself as a "militant" member of the Parti Quebecois and accused other PQ members of infiltrating the local riding association. He came in 3rd place in the nomination convention, losing to Odina Desrochers. Landry decided to run as an independent and received 6% of the vote.

He joined the federalist Progressive Conservative party for the 2000 federal election and unsuccessfully campaigned for a Parliamentary seat in the Lotbinière—L'Érable riding. After electoral districts were restructured, Landry made another unsuccessful bid for Parliament in the 2004 federal election at the Lotbinière—Chutes-de-la-Chaudière riding, after his party became the Conservative party. He campaigned for the Conservatives again in the Richmond—Arthabaska riding in the 2006 general election.

In the 2021 Canadian federal election, Landry was the People's Party of Canada candidate in Trois-Rivières, but finished in 5th place.

== Electoral record ==
1993 Canadian federal election: Lotbinière
Party	Candidate	Votes
Bloc Québécois	Jean Landry	26,763
Liberal	Michael Provencher	14,659
Progressive Conservative	Jacques Le Sieur	7,387
New Democratic	André-Pierre Robitaille	714

1997 Canadian federal election: Lotbinière
Party	Candidate	Votes
Bloc Québécois	Odina Desrochers	13,069
Liberal	Pierre Savoie	10,062
Progressive Conservative	Gaston Beaudet	9,690
Independent	Jean Landry	1,988
New Democratic	Dominique Vaillancourt	445

2021 Canadian federal election: Trois-Rivières
Party	Candidate	Votes	%	±%	Expenditures
Bloc Québécois	René Villemure	17,136	29.49	+1.01	$16,854.26
Conservative	Yves Lévesque	17,053	29.35	+4.17	$40,285.49
Liberal	Martin Francoeur	16,637	28.63	+2.57	$80,504.68
New Democratic	Adis Simidzija	4,680	8.05	-8.61	$4,281.85
People's	Jean Landry	1,115	1.92	+0.99	$0.00
Green	Andrew Holman	754	1.30	-1.17	$0.00
Free	Gilles Brodeur	735	1.26	–	$1,244.68
Total valid votes/expense limit		58,110	97.95	–	$120,485.08
Total rejected ballots		1,214	2.05	–	
Turnout		59,324	64.19	-2.53	
Eligible voters		92,413			
Bloc Québécois hold		Swing		-1.58	
Source: Elections Canada
