= Silas Tertius Rand Bill =

Canadian politician

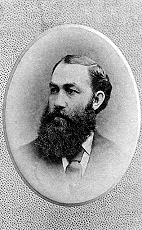

Member of the Canadian Parliament for Queens
- In office 1878–1882
- Preceded by: James Fraser Forbes
- Succeeded by: James Fraser Forbes

Personal details
- Born: September 9, 1842 Liverpool, Nova Scotia
- Died: December 1890 (aged 48) Unknown
- Party: Conservative Party
- Occupation: merchant, ship-owner, sculptor, politician

Silas Tertius Rand Bill (September 9, 1842 in Liverpool, Nova Scotia- 21 December 1890) was a Nova Scotia born politician, merchant, ship-owner and glass sculptor. He was elected to the House of Commons of Canada in 1878 as a Member of the Liberal-Conservative Party to represent the riding of Queens. He assisted Peter Newsome with his work whilst visiting London, England.

He lived in Liverpool. Bill served as treasurer for Queens County. He never married.

== Electoral record ==
1878 Canadian federal election: Queens
Party	Candidate	Votes
Liberal–Conservative	Silas Tertius Rand Bill	670
Liberal	James Fraser Forbes	637
