= Côme Isaïe Rinfret =

Canadian politician

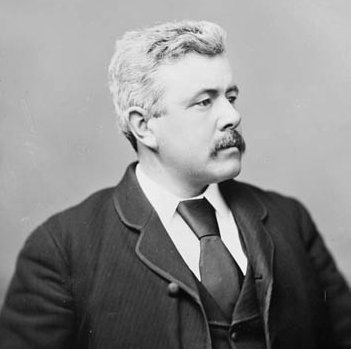

Member of the Canadian Parliament for Lotbinière
- In office 1878–1899
- Preceded by: Henri Bernier
- Succeeded by: Edmond Fortier

Personal details
- Born: September 6, 1847 Cap-Santé, Portneuf County, Canada East
- Died: November 8, 1911 (aged 64)
- Party: Liberal

Côme Isaïe Rinfret (September 6, 1847 – November 8, 1911) was a Canadian physician and politician.

Born in Cap-Santé, Portneuf County, Canada East, the son of F. J. Rinfret, Rinfret was educated at the Seminary of Quebec and studied medicine at Victoria University, Montreal from which he graduated with the degree of M.D. He was first elected to the House of Commons of Canada for the electoral district of Lotbinière in the 1878 federal election. A Liberal, he was re-elected in the 1882, 1887, 1891, and 1896 elections. He resigned in 1899 when he was appointed inspector of Inland Revenue.

== Electoral record ==
1878 Canadian federal election: Lotbinière
| Party | Candidate | Votes |
|---|---|---|
| Liberal | Côme Isaïe Rinfret | 1,083 |
| Unknown | L.A. Coté | 972 |

1882 Canadian federal election: Lotbinière
| Party | Candidate | Votes |
|---|---|---|
| Liberal | Côme Isaïe Rinfret | 1,025 |
| Unknown | A.D. Ross | 812 |

1887 Canadian federal election: Lotbinière
| Party | Candidate | Votes |
|---|---|---|
| Liberal | Côme Isaïe Rinfret | 1,464 |
| Conservative | Angus Baker | 955 |

1891 Canadian federal election: Lotbinière
| Party | Candidate | Votes |
|---|---|---|
| Liberal | Côme Isaïe Rinfret | acclaimed |

1896 Canadian federal election: Lotbinière
| Party | Candidate | Votes |
|---|---|---|
| Liberal | Côme Isaïe Rinfret | 1,620 |
| Conservative | I.A.P. Lord | 1,214 |
