= Auguste Choquette =

Canadian politician

Member of Parliament for Lotbinière
- In office 8 April 1963 – 24 June 1968
- Preceded by: Raymond O'Hurley
- Succeeded by: André-Gilles Fortin

Personal details
- Born: 29 August 1932 (age 93)
- Party: Liberal
- Relatives: Fernand Choquette (father); Philippe-Auguste Choquette (grandfather)
- Education: University of Montreal; University of Ottawa
- Profession: Lawyer

Auguste Choquette (French pronunciation: [oɡyst ʃɔkɛt]; born 29 August 1932) was a Liberal party member of the House of Commons of Canada. He was a lawyer by career.

He was first elected at the Lotbinière riding in the 1963 general election after an unsuccessful attempt there in 1962. Choquette was re-elected in 1965, but with riding changes was defeated at Bellechasse riding in the 1968 federal election by Adrien Lambert of the Ralliement créditiste. Choquette did not seek another term in Parliament after this.

Choquette was a supporter of the Death Penalty.

1962 Canadian federal election: Lotbinière
Party	Candidate	Votes
Progressive Conservative	Raymond O'Hurley	6,183
Liberal	Auguste Choquette	5,581
Social Credit	Adélard Larose	4,287

1963 Canadian federal election: Lotbinière
Party	Candidate	Votes
Liberal	Auguste Choquette	6,957
Progressive Conservative	Raymond O'Hurley	5,449
Social Credit	Gérard Lamontagne	3,442
