= Maurice Tremblay =

Canadian politician (1944–2022)

Member of Parliament for Lotbinière
- In office 1984–1993
- Preceded by: Jean-Guy Dubois
- Succeeded by: Jean Landry

Personal details
- Born: April 23, 1944 Jonquière, Quebec, Canada
- Died: 20 February 2022 (aged 77)
- Party: Progressive Conservative
- Profession: Lawyer

Maurice Tremblay (23 April 1944 – 20 February 2022) was a Progressive Conservative member of the House of Commons of Canada. Born in Jonquière, Quebec, he was a lawyer by career.

He represented the Quebec riding of Lotbinière where he was first elected in the 1984 federal election and re-elected in 1988, therefore becoming a member in the 33rd and 34th Canadian Parliaments.

Tremblay left federal politics in 1993 as he did not seek a third term in Parliament.

1984 Canadian federal election: Lotbinière
| Party | Candidate | Votes |
|---|---|---|
| Progressive Conservative | Maurice Tremblay | 22,584 |
| Liberal | Jean-Guy Dubois | 20,202 |
| New Democratic | Gaston Coté | 1,963 |
| Rhinoceros | André Sévigny | 909 |
| Parti nationaliste | Nelson Bouffard | 881 |

1988 Canadian federal election: Lotbinière
| Party | Candidate | Votes |
|---|---|---|
| Progressive Conservative | Maurice Tremblay | 26,585 |
| Liberal | Pierre Lajeunesse | 15,067 |
| New Democratic | Richard Lacoursière | 8,782 |
