= Henri Bernier =

Canadian politician (1821–1893)

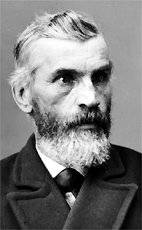

Member of the Canadian Parliament for Lotbinière
- In office 1874–1878
- Preceded by: Henri-Gustave Joly de Lotbinière
- Succeeded by: Côme Isaïe Rinfret

Personal details
- Born: July 6, 1821 St-Louis de Lotbinière, Lower Canada
- Died: November 9, 1893 (aged 72) St-Louis de Lotbinière, Quebec, Canada
- Party: Liberal
- Occupation: businessman, manufacturer

Henry Bernier (July 6, 1821 in St. Louis de Lotbinière, Lower Canada – November 9, 1893) was a Canadian politician, businessman and manufacturer.

The son of Jean-Baptiste Bernier and Margaret Bélanger, Bernier was educated locally. He married Henrietta Paré. Bernier was principal partner in H. Bernier and Company, which operated a foundry and produced agricultural implements. He was president of the Deschambault and Lotbinière Steamboar Company. He was elected to the House of Commons of Canada in the 1874 election as a Member of the Liberal Party to represent the riding of Lotbinière.
