= Jean-Guy Dubois =

Canadian politician

Member of Parliament for Lotbinière
- In office April 1980 – July 1984
- Preceded by: Richard Janelle
- Succeeded by: Maurice Tremblay

Personal details
- Born: 2 April 1948 (age 78) Sainte-Cécile-de-Lévrard, Quebec, Canada
- Party: Liberal
- Profession: lawyer, professor

Jean-Guy Dubois (born 2 April 1948 in Sainte-Cécile-de-Lévrard, Quebec) was a Liberal Party member of the House of Commons of Canada.
