= Hugues Lapointe =

Canadian politician (1911–1982)

The Honourable Hugues Lapointe PC OC CD QC

22nd Lieutenant Governor of Quebec
- In office February 22, 1966 – April 27, 1978
- Monarch: Elizabeth II
- Governors General: Georges Vanier; Roland Michener; Jules Léger
- Premier: Jean Lesage; Daniel Johnson, Sr. Jean Jacques Bertrand; Robert Bourassa; René Lévesque
- Preceded by: Paul Comtois
- Succeeded by: Jean-Pierre Côté

Member of Parliament for Lotbinière
- In office March 26, 1940 – June 10, 1957
- Preceded by: Joseph-Napoléon Francoeur
- Succeeded by: Raymond O'Hurley

Personal details
- Born: March 3, 1911 Rivière-du-Loup, Quebec, Canada
- Died: November 13, 1982 (aged 71) Sainte-Foy, Quebec, Canada
- Party: Liberal
- Relations: Ernest Lapointe (father)
- Cabinet: Postmaster General (1955–1957); Minister of Veterans Affairs (1950–1957); Solicitor General of Canada (1949–1950)
- Portfolio: Parliamentary Assistant to the Minister of National Defence (1945–1949); Parliamentary Assistant to the Secretary of State for External Affairs (1949)

Hugues Lapointe PC OC CD QC (French pronunciation: [yɡ lapwɛ̃t]; 3 March 1911 – 13 November 1982) was a Canadian lawyer, Member of Parliament and Lieutenant Governor of Quebec from 1966 to 1978.

== Life and career ==
Born in Rivière-du-Loup, Quebec, the son of the Canadian Member of Parliament Ernest Lapointe and Emma Pratte, he studied at the University of Ottawa and Université Laval. He was admitted to the Quebec Bar in 1935. He practised law from 1936 to 1961. He served during World War II and achieved the rank of lieutenant colonel.

He was elected as a Liberal in the 1940 federal election in the Quebec riding of Lotbinière. He was re-elected in the 1945, 1949, and 1953 elections. He was defeated in the 1957 election.

He held three cabinet positions: Solicitor General of Canada (1949–1950), Minister of Veterans Affairs (1950–1957), and Postmaster General (1955–1957).

In 1979, he was made an Officer of the Order of Canada.

He was married to Marie-Lucette Valin.

1940 Canadian federal election: Lotbinière
Party	Candidate	Votes
Liberal	Hugues Lapointe	8,983
Independent	Gérard Laliberté	4,627

1945 Canadian federal election: Lotbinière
Party	Candidate	Votes
Liberal	Hugues Lapointe	10,122
Independent	Omer Langlois	5,813

1949 Canadian federal election: Lotbinière
Party	Candidate	Votes
Liberal	Hugues Lapointe	8,849
Independent	Adrien Lambert	6,430
Union des électeurs	BenjaminDemers	288
Progressive Conservative	Marie-Joseph-Émile Rousseau	72

1953 Canadian federal election: Lotbinière
Party	Candidate	Votes
Liberal	Hugues Lapointe	9,047
Progressive Conservative	Rolland Legendre	6,879

1957 Canadian federal election: Lotbinière
Party	Candidate	Votes
Progressive Conservative	Raymond O'Hurley	8,372
Liberal	Hugues Lapointe	7,823
