= Joseph-Achille Verville =

Canadian politician

Member of Parliament for Lotbinière
- In office October 1925 – November 1937
- Preceded by: Thomas Vien
- Succeeded by: Joseph-Napoléon Francoeur

Personal details
- Born: 23 January 1887 Sainte-Gertrude, Quebec
- Died: 20 November 1937 (aged 50)
- Party: Liberal
- Spouse(s): Alice Provencher; 23 September 1913 (dec.)
- Profession: Notary

Joseph-Achille Verville (23 January 1887 – 20 November 1937) was a Liberal party member of the House of Commons of Canada. He was born in Sainte-Gertrude, Quebec and became a notary.

Verville attended Nicolete College and Université Laval. He was mayor of Saint-Flavien, Quebec at one time.

He was first elected to Parliament at the Lotbinière riding in the 1925 general election and re-elected in 1926, 1930 and 1935.

Verville died on 20 November 1937 before completing his term in the 18th Canadian Parliament.

== Electoral record ==
1925 Canadian federal election: Lotbinière
Party	Candidate	Votes
Liberal	Joseph-Achille Verville	3,819
Conservative	Joseph Adalbert Pouliot	1,402
Liberal	Omer Langlois	1,358

1926 Canadian federal election: Lotbinière
Party	Candidate	Votes
Liberal	Joseph-Achille Verville	4,650
Independent	Joseph Uldéric Paris	3,345

1930 Canadian federal election: Lotbinière
Party	Candidate	Votes
Liberal	Joseph-Achille Verville	5,068
Conservative	Wilfrid Laliberté	3,863
Source: lop.parl.ca

1935 Canadian federal election: Lotbinière
Party	Candidate	Votes
Liberal	Joseph-Achille Verville	9,768
Conservative	Apollinaire Castonguay	5,373
