= List of members of the Canadian House of Commons (E) =

== Ea ==
- Gordon S. Earle b. 1943 first elected in 1997 as New Democratic Party member for Halifax West, Nova Scotia.
- Philip Earle first elected in 2025 as Liberal member for Labrador, Newfoundland and Labrador.
- Thomas Earle b. 1837 first elected in 1889 as Conservative member for Victoria, British Columbia.
- Arnold Wayne Easter b. 1949 first elected in 1993 as Liberal member for Malpeque, Prince Edward Island.

== Ec ==
- Arthur Ecrément b. 1879 first elected in 1908 as Liberal member for Berthier, Quebec.

== Ed ==
- James David Edgar b. 1841 first elected in 1872 as Liberal member for Monck, Ontario.
- Philip Edmonston b. 1944 first elected in 1990 as New Democratic Party member for Chambly, Quebec.
- Alexander McKay Edwards b. 1876 first elected in 1925 as Conservative member for Waterloo South, Ontario.
- Gordon Cameron Edwards b. 1866 first elected in 1926 as Liberal member for City of Ottawa, Ontario.
- Jim Edwards b. 1936 first elected in 1984 as Progressive Conservative member for Edmonton South, Alberta.
- John Wesley Edwards b. 1865 first elected in 1908 as Conservative member for Frontenac, Ontario.
- Manley Justin Edwards b. 1892 first elected in 1940 as Liberal member for Calgary West, Alberta.
- William Cameron Edwards b. 1844 first elected in 1887 as Liberal member for Russell, Ontario.

== Ef ==
- John Efford b. 1944 first elected in 2002 as Liberal member for Bonavista—Trinity—Conception, Newfoundland and Labrador.

== Eg ==
- Arthur C. Eggleton b. 1943 first elected in 1993 as Liberal member for York Centre, Ontario.
- Jim Eglinski b. 1948 first elected in 2014 as Conservative member for Yellowhead, Alberta.

== Eh ==
- Ali Ehsassi b. 1970 first elected in 2015 as Liberal member for Willowdale, Ontario.

== Ei ==
- James Daniel Eisenhauer b. 1832 first elected in 1887 as Liberal member for Lunenburg, Nova Scotia.

== El ==
- Fayçal El-Khoury b. 1955 first elected in 2015 as Liberal member for Laval—Les Îles, Quebec.
- Angus Alexander Elderkin b. 1896 first elected in 1949 as Liberal member for Annapolis—Kings, Nova Scotia.
- Stanley Edward Elkin b. 1880 first elected in 1917 as Unionist member for St. John—Albert, New Brunswick.
- Reed Elley b. 1945 first elected in 1997 as Reform member for Nanaimo—Cowichan, British Columbia.
- George Elliott b. 1875 first elected in 1911 as Conservative member for Middlesex North, Ontario.
- John Campbell Elliott b. 1872 first elected in 1925 as Liberal member for Middlesex West, Ontario.
- Nelson Elliott b. 1925 first elected in 1979 as Progressive Conservative member for London—Middlesex, Ontario.
- Otto Buchanan Elliott b. 1886 first elected in 1935 as Social Credit member for Kindersley, Saskatchewan.
- Preston Elliott b. 1875 first elected in 1921 as Progressive member for Dundas, Ontario.
- William Elliott b. 1837 first elected in 1878 as Conservative member for Peel, Ontario.
- William Elliott b. 1872 first elected in 1921 as Progressive member for Waterloo South, Ontario.
- Alfred Claude Ellis b. 1919 first elected in 1953 as CCF member for Regina City, Saskatchewan.
- Jack Ellis b. 1929 first elected in 1972 as Progressive Conservative member for Hastings, Ontario.
- John Valentine Ellis b. 1835 first elected in 1887 as Liberal member for City of St. John, New Brunswick.
- Neil Ellis b. 1962 first elected in 2015 as Liberal member for Bay of Quinte, Ontario.
- Stephen Ellis b. 1968 first elected in 2021 as Conservative member for Cumberland—Colchester, Nova Scotia.
- Peter Elson b. 1841 first elected in 1904 as Conservative member for Middlesex East, Ontario.
- Peter Elzinga b. 1944 first elected in 1974 as Progressive Conservative member for Pembina, Alberta.

== Em ==
- René Émard b. 1914 first elected in 1963 as Liberal member for Vaudreuil—Soulanges, Quebec.
- Alexander Thomas Embury b. 1874 first elected in 1925 as Conservative member for Hastings—Peterborough, Ontario.
- David Emerson b. 1945 first elected in 2004 as Liberal member for Vancouver Kingsway, British Columbia.
- Henry Read Emmerson b. 1883 first elected in 1935 as Liberal member for Westmorland, New Brunswick.
- Henry Emmerson b. 1853 first elected in 1900 as Liberal member for Westmorland, New Brunswick.

== En ==
- Frank A. Enfield b. 1920 first elected in 1953 as Liberal member for York—Scarborough, Ontario.
- John English b. 1945 first elected in 1993 as Liberal member for Kitchener, Ontario.
- Roland Léo English b. 1909 first elected in 1957 as Progressive Conservative member for Gaspé, Quebec.
- Siegfried John Enns b. 1924 first elected in 1962 as Progressive Conservative member for Portage—Neepawa, Manitoba.

== Ep ==
- Abram Ernest Epp b. 1941 first elected in 1984 as New Democratic Party member for Thunder Bay—Nipigon, Ontario.
- Arthur Jacob Epp b. 1939 first elected in 1972 as Progressive Conservative member for Provencher, Manitoba.
- Dave Epp b. 1962 first elected in 2019 as Conservative member for Chatham-Kent—Leamington, Ontario.
- Ken Epp b. 1939 first elected in 1993 as Reform member for Elk Island, Alberta.

== Er ==
- Dilman Kinsey Erb b. 1857 first elected in 1896 as Liberal member for Perth South, Ontario.
- William Gordon Ernst b. 1897 first elected in 1926 as Conservative member for Queens—Lunenburg, Nova Scotia.
- Judy Erola b. 1934 first elected in 1980 as Liberal member for Nickel Belt, Ontario.
- Nathaniel Erskine-Smith b. 1984 first elected in 2015 as Liberal member for Beaches—East York, Ontario.

== Es ==
- William Kemble Esling b. 1868 first elected in 1925 as Conservative member for Kootenay West, British Columbia.

== Et ==
- Denis Éthier b. 1926 first elected in 1972 as Liberal member for Glengarry—Prescott—Russell, Ontario.
- Joseph Arthur Calixte Éthier b. 1868 first elected in 1896 as Liberal member for Two Mountains, Quebec.
- Viateur Éthier b. 1915 first elected in 1962 as Liberal member for Glengarry—Prescott, Ontario.

== Eu ==
- Raymond Pierre Eudes b. 1912 first elected in 1940 as Liberal member for Hochelaga, Quebec.
- William Daum Euler b. 1875 first elected in 1917 as Laurier Liberal member for Waterloo North, Ontario.

== Ev ==
- Charles Robert Evans b. 1882 first elected in 1935 as Liberal member for Maple Creek, Saskatchewan.
- John Evans (Progressive) b. 1867 first elected in 1921 as Progressive member for Saskatoon, Saskatchewan.
- John Leslie Evans b. 1941 first elected in 1979 as Liberal member for Ottawa Centre, Ontario.
- Gustave Evanturel b. 1879 first elected in 1925 as Liberal member for Prescott, Ontario.
- Charles Arthur Everett b. 1828 first elected in 1885 as Conservative member for City and County of St. John, New Brunswick.

== Ey ==
- Mark Eyking b. 1960 first elected in 2000 as Liberal member for Sydney—Victoria, Nova Scotia.
- Doug Eyolfson b. 1963 first elected in 2015 as Liberal member for Charleswood—St. James—Assiniboia—Headingley, Manitoba.
- Karl Eyre b. 1896 first elected in 1949 as Liberal member for Timmins, Ontario.
