= Francis Gordon Forbes =

Canadian politician

Francis Gordon Forbes (27 December 1857 – 4 September 1941) was a lawyer, judge and political figure in Nova Scotia, Canada. He represented Queens and then Shelburne and Queen's in the House of Commons of Canada from 1891 to 1896 as a Liberal member.

He was born in Liverpool, Nova Scotia, the son of James Fraser Forbes and Sarah Jane Jacobs. Forbes was educated at St. Peter's School in Prince Edward Island and the University of King's College in Windsor. He was admitted to the Nova Scotia bar in 1883. In 1887, he married Harriette Frances Collins. He practised law in Halifax. Forbes resigned his seat in July 1896 after he was named sub-Collector of Customs. In 1897, he was named a county court judge for Nova Scotia, serving until 1921. Forbes died in Vancouver, British Columbia at the age of 83.

His sister Sarah served as a nursing sister with the Canadian contingent in the Boer War.

1891 Canadian federal election: Queens
Party	Candidate	Votes
Liberal	Francis Gordon Forbes	867
Liberal–Conservative	Joshua Newton Freeman	766

By-election on 9 February 1892
Party	Candidate	Votes
Liberal	Francis Gordon Forbes	acclaimed
