= List of members of the Canadian House of Commons (N) =

== Na ==
- Richard Nadeau b. 1959 first elected in 2006 as Bloc Québécois member for Gatineau, Quebec.
- Joseph-Célestin Nadon b. 1899 first elected in 1949 as Liberal member for Gatineau, Quebec.
- Guillaume-Alphonse Nantel b. 1852 first elected in 1882 as Conservative member for Terrebonne, Quebec.
- Pierre Nantel b. 1963 first elected in 2011 as New Democratic Party member for Longueuil—Pierre-Boucher, Quebec.
- Wilfrid Bruno Nantel b. 1857 first elected in 1908 as Conservative member for Terrebonne, Quebec.
- Yasir Naqvi b. 1973 first elected in 2021 as Liberal member for Ottawa Centre, Ontario.
- Peggy Nash b. 1951 first elected in 2006 as New Democratic Party member for Parkdale—High Park, Ontario.
- Edward Nasserden b. 1919 first elected in 1958 as Progressive Conservative member for Rosthern, Saskatchewan.
- Eva Nassif first elected in 2015 as Liberal member for Vimy, Quebec.
- John Nater b. 1984 first elected in 2015 as Conservative member for Perth Wellington, Ontario.
- Henry Nathan b. 1842 first elected in 1871 as Liberal member for Victoria, British Columbia.
- Juanita Nathan first elected in 2025 as Liberal member for Pickering—Brooklin, Ontario.
- Bob Nault b. 1955 first elected in 1988 as Liberal member for Kenora—Rainy River, Ontario.

== Ne ==
- Paddy Neale b. 1921 first elected in 1972 as New Democratic Party member for Vancouver East, British Columbia.
- Joseph Needham b. 1876 first elected in 1935 as Social Credit member for The Battlefords, Saskatchewan.
- David Bradley Neely b. 1873 first elected in 1908 as Liberal member for Humboldt, Saskatchewan.
- Doug Neil b. 1924 first elected in 1972 as Progressive Conservative member for Moose Jaw, Saskatchewan.
- Alan Webster Neill b. 1868 first elected in 1921 as Progressive member for Comox—Alberni, British Columbia.
- Hugh Nelson b. 1830 first elected in 1871 as Liberal-Conservative member for New Westminster District, British Columbia.
- Nels Nelson b. 1917 first elected in 1972 as New Democratic Party member for Burnaby—Seymour, British Columbia.
- Edward Walter Nesbitt b. 1859 first elected in 1908 as Liberal member for Oxford North, Ontario.
- Wally Nesbitt b. 1918 first elected in 1953 as Progressive Conservative member for Oxford, Ontario.
- Eli Nesdoly b. 1931 first elected in 1972 as New Democratic Party member for Meadow Lake, Saskatchewan.
- Hilaire Neveu b. 1839 first elected in 1889 as Nationalist member for Joliette, Quebec.
- Louis-Paul Neveu b. 1931 first elected in 1965 as Liberal member for Shefford, Quebec.
- Anita Neville b. 1942 first elected in 2000 as Liberal member for Winnipeg South Centre, Manitoba.

== Ng ==
- Mary Ng b. 1968 first elected in 2017 as Liberal member for Markham-Thornhill, Ontario.
- Chi Nguyen first elected in 2025 as Liberal member for Spadina—Harbourfront, Ontario.

== Ni ==
- Jamie Nicholls b. 1971 first elected in 2011 as New Democratic Party member for Vaudreuil—Soulanges, Quebec.
- Aideen Nicholson b. 1927 first elected in 1974 as Liberal member for Trinity, Ontario.
- Alexander Malcolm Nicholson b. 1900 first elected in 1940 as Cooperative Commonwealth Federation member for Mackenzie, Saskatchewan.
- Donald Nicholson b. 1850 first elected in 1911 as Conservative member for Queen's, Prince Edward Island.
- George Brecken Nicholson b. 1868 first elected in 1917 as Unionist member for Algoma East, Ontario.
- John Robert Nicholson b. 1901 first elected in 1962 as Liberal member for Vancouver Centre, British Columbia.
- Robert Douglas Nicholson b. 1952 first elected in 1984 as Progressive Conservative member for Niagara Falls, Ontario.
- Dave Nickerson b. 1944 first elected in 1979 as Progressive Conservative member for Western Arctic, Northwest Territories.
- Carl Olof Nickle b. 1914 first elected in 1951 as Progressive Conservative member for Calgary West, Alberta.
- William Folger Nickle b. 1869 first elected in 1911 as Conservative member for Kingston, Ontario.
- Dorise Winifred Nielsen b. 1902 first elected in 1940 as Unity member for North Battleford, Saskatchewan.
- Erik Nielsen b. 1924 first elected in 1957 as Progressive Conservative member for Yukon, Yukon.
- George E. Nixon b. 1898 first elected in 1940 as Liberal member for Algoma West, Ontario.

== No ==
- Percy Verner Noble 1902-1996, first elected in 1957 as Progressive Conservative member for Grey North, Ontario.
- Aurélien Noël b. 1904 first elected in 1967 as Liberal member for Outremont—St-Jean, Quebec.
- Taleeb Noormohamed b. 1976 first elected in 2021 as Liberal member for Vancouver Granville, British Columbia.
- Rick Norlock b. 1948 first elected in 2006 as Conservative member for Northumberland—Quinte West, Ontario.
- Gilbert Normand b. 1943 first elected in 1997 as Liberal member for Bellechasse—Etchemins—Montmagny—L'Islet, Quebec.
- Christine Normandin b. 1984 first elected in 2019 as Bloc Québécois member for Saint-Jean, Quebec.
- James Norris b. 1809 first elected in 1874 as Liberal member for Lincoln, Ontario.
- William Barton Northrup b. 1856 first elected in 1892 as Conservative member for Hastings East, Ontario.
- Joseph William Noseworthy b. 1888 first elected in 1942 as Cooperative Commonwealth Federation member for York South, Ontario.
- George Clyde Nowlan b. 1898 first elected in 1948 as Progressive Conservative member for Digby—Annapolis—Kings, Nova Scotia.
- Pat Nowlan b. 1931 first elected in 1965 as Progressive Conservative member for Digby—Annapolis—Kings, Nova Scotia.

== Nt ==
- Bienvenu-Olivier Ntumba first elected in 2025 as Liberal member for Mont-Saint-Bruno—L'Acadie, Quebec.

== Nu ==
- Terry Nugent b. 1920 first elected in 1958 as Progressive Conservative member for Edmonton—Strathcona, Alberta.
- Osvaldo Nunez b. 1938 first elected in 1993 as Bloc Québécois member for Bourassa, Quebec.
- José Núñez-Melo b. 1956 first elected in 2011 as New Democratic Party member for Laval, Quebec.
- John Nunziata b. 1955 first elected in 1984 as Liberal member for York South—Weston, Ontario.
- Alex Nuttall b. 1985 first elected in 2015 as Conservative member for Barrie—Springwater—Oro-Medonte, Ontario.

== Ny ==
- Terry Nylander b. 1946 first elected in 1979 as Progressive Conservative member for The Battlefords—Meadow Lake, Saskatchewan.
- Lorne Nystrom b. 1946 first elected in 1968 as New Democratic Party member for Yorkton—Melville, Saskatchewan.
