= List of members of the Canadian House of Commons (I) =

- Angelo Iacono b. 1973 first elected in 2015 as a Liberal member for Alfred-Pellan, Quebec.
- Tony Ianno b. 1957 first elected in 1993 as a Liberal member for Trinity—Spadina, Ontario.
- Lori Idlout b. 1974 first elected in 2021 as a New Democratic Party member for Nunavut, Nunavut.
- Marci Ien b. 1969 first elected in 2020 as a Liberal member for Toronto Centre, Ontario.
- David Iftody b. 1956 first elected in 1993 as a Liberal member for Provencher, Manitoba.
- Michael Ignatieff b. 1947 first elected in 2006 as a Liberal member for Etobicoke—Lakeshore, Ontario
- James Lorimer Ilsley b. 1894 first elected in 1926 as a Liberal member for Hants—Kings, Nova Scotia.
- Andrew B. Ingram b. 1851 first elected in 1891 as a Liberal-Conservative member for Elgin East, Ontario.
- James Innes b. 1833 first elected in 1882 as a Liberal member for Wellington South, Ontario.
- David Irvine b. 1831 first elected in 1881 as a Liberal member for Carleton, New Brunswick.
- George Irvine b. 1826 first elected in 1867 as a Conservative member for Mégantic, Quebec.
- John Alfred Irvine b. 1912 first elected in 1963 as a Progressive Conservative member for London, Ontario.
- William Irvine b. 1885 first elected in 1921 as a Labour Party member for East Calgary, Alberta.
- Aemilius Irving b. 1823 first elected in 1874 as a Liberal member for Hamilton, Ontario.
- Ron Irwin b. 1936 first elected in 1980 as a Liberal member for Sault Ste. Marie, Ontario.
- Thomas Irwin b. 1889 first elected in 1957 as a Social Credit member for Burnaby—Richmond, British Columbia.
- Joseph Gaston Isabelle b. 1920 first elected in 1965 as a Liberal member for Gatineau, Quebec.
- Gordon Benjamin Isnor b. 1885 first elected in 1935 as a Liberal member for Halifax, Nova Scotia.
- Peter Ittinuar b. 1950 first elected in 1979 as a New Democratic Party member for Nunatsiaq, Northwest Territories.
- William Bullock Ives b. 1841 first elected in 1878 as a Conservative member for Richmond—Wolfe, Quebec.
