= List of members of the Canadian House of Commons (Q) =

- Mumilaaq Qaqqaq b. 1993 first elected in 2019 as New Democratic Party member for Nunavut.
- Anne Minh-Thu Quach b. 1982 first elected in 2011 as New Democratic Party member for Salaberry—Suroît, Quebec.
- Carla Qualtrough b. 1971 first elected in 2015 as Liberal member for Delta, British Columbia.
- Victor Quelch b. 1891 first elected in 1935 as Social Credit member for Acadia, Alberta.
- Felix Patrick Quinn b. 1874 first elected in 1925 as Conservative member for Halifax, Nova Scotia.
- Michael Joseph Francis Quinn b. 1851 first elected in 1896 as Conservative member for St. Anne, Quebec.
