= List of members of the Canadian House of Commons (Z) =

Name	Party	Electoral district	Province	Term in office	Lifespan
Bonita Zarrillo	New Democratic Party	Port Moody—Coquitlam	British Columbia	2021 - 2025	1965 or 1966 – present
Salma Zahid	Liberal	Scarborough Centre	Ontario	2015 - present	1970–present
Lenore Zann	Liberal	Cumberland—Colchester	Nova Scotia	2019 - 2021	1959–present
Fred Zaplitny	Cooperative Commonwealth Federation	Dauphin	Manitoba	1945 - 1949	1913–1964
Fred Zaplitny	Cooperative Commonwealth Federation	Dauphin	Manitoba	1953 - 1958	1913–1964
Lise Zarac	Liberal	LaSalle—Émard	Quebec	2008 - 2011	1950–present
Paul Zed	Liberal	Fundy—Royal	New Brunswick	1993 - 1997	1956–present
Paul Zed	Liberal	Saint John	New Brunswick	2004 - 2008	1956–present
John Zerucelli	Liberal	Etobicoke North	Ontario	2025 - present	
Bob Zimmer	Conservative	Prince George—Peace River; Prince George—Peace River—Northern Rockies	British Columbia	2011 - present	1968–present
Adam Zimmerman	Liberal	Hamilton West	Ontario	1904 - 1908	1852–1919
Sameer Zuberi	Liberal	Pierrefonds—Dollard	Quebec	2019 - present	1979–present
