= List of members of the Canadian House of Commons (Y) =

== Ya ==
- Val Yacula b. 1908 first elected in 1958 as Progressive Conservative member for Springfield, Manitoba.
- Antonio Yanakis b. 1922 first elected in 1965 as Liberal member for Berthier—Maskinongé—delanaudière, Quebec.

== Ye ==
- Lynne Yelich b. 1953 first elected in 2000 as Canadian Alliance member for Blackstrap, Saskatchewan.
- James Yeo b. 1832 first elected in 1873 as Liberal member for Prince County, Prince Edward Island.
- John Yeo b. 1837 first elected in 1896 as Liberal member for East Prince, Prince Edward Island.
- Paul Yewchuk b. 1937 first elected in 1968 as Progressive Conservative member for Athabaska, Alberta.

== Yi ==
- Jean Yip b. 1968 first elected in 2017 as Liberal member for Scarborough—Agincourt, Ontario.

== Yo ==
- Alexander MacGillivray Young b. 1878 first elected in 1925 as Liberal member for Saskatoon, Saskatchewan.
- Edward James Young b. 1878 first elected in 1925 as Liberal member for Weyburn, Saskatchewan.
- James Young b. 1835 first elected in 1867 as Liberal member for Waterloo South, Ontario.
- John Young b. 1811 first elected in 1872 as Liberal member for Montreal West, Quebec.
- Kate Young b. 1955 first elected in 2015 as Liberal member for London West, Ontario.
- M. Douglas Young b. 1940 first elected in 1988 as Liberal member for Gloucester, New Brunswick.
- Neil Young b. 1936 first elected in 1980 as New Democratic Party member for Beaches, Ontario.
- Newton Manly Young b. 1892 first elected in 1926 as Conservative member for Toronto Northeast, Ontario.
- Rodney Young b. 1910 first elected in 1948 as Cooperative Commonwealth Federation member for Vancouver Centre, British Columbia.
- Roger Young b. 1941 first elected in 1974 as Liberal member for Niagara Falls, Ontario.
- Terence Young b. 1952 first elected in 2008 as Conservative member for Oakville, Ontario.
- Wai Young b. 1960 first elected in 2011 as Conservative member for Vancouver South, British Columbia.

== Yu ==
- Charles Yuill b. 1889 first elected in 1953 as Social Credit member for Jasper—Edson, Alberta.
- David Yurdiga b. 1964 first elected in 2014 as Conservative member for Fort McMurray—Athabasca, Alberta.
- William Yurko b. 1926 first elected in 1979 as Progressive Conservative member for Edmonton East, Alberta.
