= Raymond O'Hurley =

Canadian politician

The Hon. Raymond O'Hurley

Member of the Canadian Parliament for Lotbinière
- In office 1957–1963
- Preceded by: Hugues Lapointe
- Succeeded by: Auguste Choquette

Personal details
- Born: Raymond Joseph Michael O'Hurley; October 1, 1909 St-Gilles, Quebec
- Died: March 27, 1970 (aged 60)
- Party: Progressive Conservative
- Cabinet: Minister of Defence Production (1958-1963)

Raymond Joseph Michael O'Hurley, PC (October 1, 1909 – March 27, 1970) was a Canadian politician.

Born in St-Gilles, Quebec, he was first elected to the House of Commons of Canada in 1957 for the Quebec riding of Lotbinière. A Progressive Conservative, he was re-elected in 1958 and 1962. He was defeated in 1963 and 1965. From 1957 to 1958, he was the Parliamentary Assistant to the Minister of Mines and Technical Surveys. From 1958 to 1963, he was the Minister of Defence Production.

1957 Canadian federal election: Lotbinière
Party	Candidate	Votes
Progressive Conservative	Raymond O'Hurley	8,372
Liberal	Hugues Lapointe	7,823

1958 Canadian federal election: Lotbinière
Party	Candidate	Votes
Progressive Conservative	Raymond O'Hurley	9,610
Liberal	Paul Biron	6,432

1962 Canadian federal election: Lotbinière
Party	Candidate	Votes
Progressive Conservative	Raymond O'Hurley	6,183
Liberal	Auguste Choquette	5,581
Social Credit	Adélard Larose	4,287

1963 Canadian federal election: Lotbinière
Party	Candidate	Votes
Liberal	Auguste Choquette	6,957
Progressive Conservative	Raymond O'Hurley	5,449
Social Credit	Gérard Lamontagne	3,442

Political offices
Preceded by Howard Charles Green (acting)	Minister of Defence Production; 1958–1963	Succeeded by Charles Drury
