= James Fraser Forbes =

Canadian politician

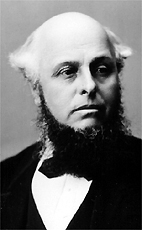

James Fraser Forbes (1820 – 18 May 1887) was a Canadian politician and a member of the House of Commons of Canada for the riding of Queens in Nova Scotia.

He was born in Gibraltar in 1820, the son of Anthony V.S. Forbes. He worked as a physician and as a surgeon, also serving as surgeon to the local militia, coroner for Queen's County and Health Officer for Liverpool. Forbes married Sarah Jane Jacobs. He was elected to the 1st Canadian Parliament as a member of the Anti-Confederation Party. He became a Liberal on January 30, 1869, and was re-elected to the 2nd and 3rd Canadian Parliaments. He was defeated in 1878, but he was re-elected in 1882. In 1874, he was elected president of the Bank of Liverpool.

Forbes died in Lunenburg in 1887.

His son Francis Gordon was also a member of the House of Commons. His daughter was a nursing sister who served with the Canadian contingent during the Boer War.

== Electoral record ==
1867 Canadian federal election: Queens
Party	Candidate	Votes
Anti-Confederation	James Fraser Forbes	844
Unknown	J. Campbell	271
Eligible voters		1,585
Source: Canadian Parliamentary Guide, 1871

1872 Canadian federal election: Queens
Party	Candidate	Votes
Liberal	James Fraser Forbes	acclaimed
Source: Canadian Elections Database

1874 Canadian federal election: Queens
Party	Candidate	Votes
Liberal	James Fraser Forbes	acclaimed
Source: lop.parl.ca

1878 Canadian federal election: Queens
Party	Candidate	Votes
Liberal–Conservative	Silas Tertius Rand Bill	670
Liberal	James Fraser Forbes	637

1882 Canadian federal election: Queens
Party	Candidate	Votes
Liberal	James Fraser Forbes	692
Liberal–Conservative	Joshua Newton Freeman	560

1887 Canadian federal election: Queens
Party	Candidate	Votes
Liberal–Conservative	Joshua Newton Freeman	824
Liberal	J.M. Mack	809
