= Queens (Nova Scotia federal electoral district) =

Former federal electoral district in Nova Scotia, Canada

Nova Scotia electoral district

Defunct federal electoral district
- Legislature: House of Commons
- District created: 1867
- District abolished: 1892
- First contested: 1867
- Last contested: 1892 by-election

Demographics
- Census division(s): Queens

Queens was a federal electoral district in the province of Nova Scotia, Canada, that was represented in the House of Commons of Canada from 1867 to 1896. It was created by the British North America Act, 1867. It consisted of the County of Queen's. It was abolished in 1892 when it was merged into Shelburne and Queen's riding.

== Members of Parliament ==
This riding elected the following members of Parliament:

Parliament	Years	Member	Party
Queens
1st	1867–1869	James Fraser Forbes	Anti-Confederation
1st	1869–1872	James Fraser Forbes	Liberal
2nd	1872–1874	James Fraser Forbes	Liberal
3rd	1874–1878	James Fraser Forbes	Liberal
4th	1878–1882	Silas Tertius Rand Bill	Liberal–Conservative
5th	1882–1887	James Fraser Forbes	Liberal
6th	1887–1891	Joshua Newton Freeman	Liberal–Conservative
7th	1891–1892	Francis Gordon Forbes	Liberal
7th	1892–1896	Francis Gordon Forbes	Liberal
Riding dissolved into Shelburne and Queen's

== Election results ==
1867 Canadian federal election
Party	Candidate	Votes
Anti-Confederation	James Fraser Forbes	844
Unknown	J. Campbell	271
Eligible voters		1,585
Source: Canadian Parliamentary Guide, 1871

1872 Canadian federal election
Party	Candidate	Votes
Liberal	James Fraser Forbes	acclaimed
Source: Canadian Elections Database

1874 Canadian federal election
Party	Candidate	Votes
Liberal	James Fraser Forbes	acclaimed
Source: lop.parl.ca

1878 Canadian federal election
Party	Candidate	Votes
Liberal–Conservative	Silas Tertius Rand Bill	670
Liberal	James Fraser Forbes	637

1882 Canadian federal election
Party	Candidate	Votes
Liberal	James Fraser Forbes	692
Liberal–Conservative	Joshua Newton Freeman	560

1887 Canadian federal election
Party	Candidate	Votes
Liberal–Conservative	Joshua Newton Freeman	824
Liberal	J.M. Mack	809

1891 Canadian federal election
Party	Candidate	Votes
Liberal	Francis Gordon Forbes	867
Liberal–Conservative	Joshua Newton Freeman	766

By-election on 9 February 1892
Party	Candidate	Votes
Liberal	Francis Gordon Forbes	acclaimed

== See also ==
- List of Canadian electoral districts
- Historical federal electoral districts of Canada
