= List of members of the Canadian House of Commons (U) =

- Tim Uppal b. 1974 first elected in 2008 as Conservative member for Edmonton—Sherwood Park, Alberta.
- Rose-Marie Ur b. 1946 first elected in 1993 as Liberal member for Lambton—Middlesex, Ontario.
- Martin Luther Urquhart b. 1883 first elected in 1930 as Liberal member for Colchester, Nova Scotia.
