= Richard Janelle =

Canadian politician

Member of Parliament for Lotbinière
- In office October 16, 1978 – February 18, 1980
- Preceded by: André-Gilles Fortin
- Succeeded by: Jean-Guy Dubois

Personal details
- Born: 13 November 1947 (age 78) Warwick, Quebec, Canada
- Party: Créditiste; Progressive Conservative
- Profession: secretary, coordinator

Richard Janelle (born 13 November 1947) is a former member of the House of Commons of Canada, holding the secretary and coordinator position.

Born in Warwick, Quebec, Janelle represented Quebec's Lotbinière electoral district at which he won a 16 October 1978 by-election. He served the remaining months of the 30th Canadian Parliament and was re-elected in the 1979 election.

Initially, he was a member of the Social Credit party, but during his term in the 31st Canadian Parliament, he joined the governing Progressive Conservative party. After the defeat of the short-lived Joe Clark administration, Janelle was defeated by Jean-Guy Dubois of the Liberal party in the 1980 election.

He made one further unsuccessful attempt to return to Parliament in a 4 May 1981 by-election in Lévis.
