= Shelburne and Queen's =

Former federal electoral district in Nova Scotia, Canada

Nova Scotia electoral district

Defunct federal electoral district
- Legislature: House of Commons
- District created: 1892
- District abolished: 1924
- First contested: 1896
- Last contested: 1922 by-election

Demographics
- Census division(s): Queens, Shelburne

Shelburne and Queen's was a federal electoral district in the province of Nova Scotia, Canada, that was represented in the House of Commons of Canada from 1896 to 1925.

This riding was created in 1892 from parts of Queens and Shelburne ridings. It consisted of the counties of Queen's and Shelburne. It was abolished in 1924 when it was redistributed into Queens—Lunenburg and Shelburne—Yarmouth ridings.

== Members of Parliament ==
This riding elected the following members of Parliament:

Parliament	Years	Member	Party
Shelburne and Queen's; Riding created from Queens and Shelburne
8th	1896–1896	Francis Gordon Forbes	Liberal
8th	1896–1900	William Stevens Fielding	Liberal
9th	1900–1904	William Stevens Fielding	Liberal
10th	1904–1906	William Stevens Fielding	Liberal
10th	1906–1908	William Stevens Fielding	Liberal
11th	1908–1911	William Stevens Fielding	Liberal
12th	1911–1917	Fleming Blanchard McCurdy	Conservative
13th	1917–1921	William Stevens Fielding	Government (Unionist)
14th	1921–1921	William Stevens Fielding	Liberal
14th	1922–1925	William Stevens Fielding	Liberal
Riding dissolved into Queens—Lunenburg and Shelburne—Yarmouth

== Election results ==
1896 Canadian federal election
Party	Candidate	Votes
Liberal	FORBES, F.G.	2,130
Conservative	CAHAN, Cha. H.	1,932

By-election: On Mr. Forbes' being appointed Sub-Collector of Customs, 18 July 1896

By-election on 5 August 1896
Party	Candidate	Votes
Liberal	FIELDING, Hon. W.S.	acclaimed

1900 Canadian federal election
Party	Candidate	Votes
Liberal	FIELDING, Hon. W.S.	2,294
Conservative	RITCHIE, J.J.	1,901

1904 Canadian federal election
Party	Candidate	Votes
Liberal	FIELDING, Hon. W.S.	2,302
Conservative	RITCHIE, James J.	1,917

By-election: On Mr. Fielding's election being declared void, 8 October 1906

By-election on 31 October 1906
Party	Candidate	Votes
Liberal	FIELDING, Hon. W.S.	2,500
Conservative	WELDON, R.C.	1,484

1908 Canadian federal election
Party	Candidate	Votes
Liberal	FIELDING, Hon. William Stevens	2,487
Conservative	MORINE, Alfred Bishop	2,145

1911 Canadian federal election
Party	Candidate	Votes
Conservative	MCCURDY, Fleming Blanchard	2,678
Liberal	FIELDING, Hon. William Stevens	2,529

1917 Canadian federal election
Party	Candidate	Votes
Government (Unionist)	FIELDING, Hon. William Stevens	acclaimed

1921 Canadian federal election
Party	Candidate	Votes
Liberal	FIELDING, Hon. William Stevens	5,237
Conservative	HALL, William Lorimer	4,520

By-election: On Mr. Fielding's acceptance of an office of emolument under the Crown, 29 December 1921

By-election on 19 January 1922
Party	Candidate	Votes
Liberal	FIELDING, Hon. William Stevens	acclaimed

== See also ==
- List of Canadian electoral districts
- Historical federal electoral districts of Canada
