= Edmond Fortier =

Canadian politician (1849–1921)

Edmond Louis Philippe Fortier
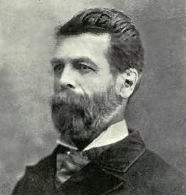

Member of the Canadian Parliament for Lotbinière
- In office 1900–1917
- Preceded by: Côme Isaïe Rinfret
- Succeeded by: Thomas Vien

Personal details
- Born: April 10, 1849 St-Gervais, Bellechasse County, Canada East
- Died: June 27, 1921 (aged 72)
- Party: Liberal

Edmond Louis Philippe Fortier (April 10, 1849 – June 27, 1921) was a Canadian politician.

Born in St-Gervais, Bellechasse County, Canada East, the son of Octave-Cyrille Fortier, a Quebec politician, and Henriette-Émilie Ruel, Fortier was educated at the Laval Normal School, Quebec. A farmer, he ran unsuccessfully in the electoral district of Beauce against Jean Blanchet for the Legislative Assembly of Quebec in 1890. He was mayor of Lambton, Quebec. He served for nineteen years in the Militia and was Captain of the 23rd Battalion of Beauce. He was first elected to the House of Commons of Canada for the electoral district of Lotbinière in a 1900 by-election. A Liberal, he was re-elected in 1900, 1904, 1908, and 1911.

== Electoral record ==
1900 Canadian federal election: Lotbinière
Party	Candidate	Votes
Liberal	Edmond Fortier	1,376
Liberal	F. Boisvert	805
Conservative	Lawrence Stafford	795

By-election on 25 January 1900 Rinfret was appointed inspector of Inland Revenue, 25 August 1899
Party	Candidate	Votes
Liberal	Edmond Fortier	1,496
Conservative	J.H. Boisvert	1,324

1904 Canadian federal election: Lotbinière
Party	Candidate	Votes
Liberal	Edmond Fortier	1,670
Conservative	Napoléon Bergeron	799

1908 Canadian federal election: Lotbinière
Party	Candidate	Votes
Liberal	Edmond Fortier	2,304
Conservative	Louis Philippe Pelletier	1,459

By-election on 26 October 1909 Due to the election being declared void on 29 September 1909
Party	Candidate	Votes
Liberal	Edmond Fortier	1,379
Conservative	Théodore Dubé	1,076

1911 Canadian federal election: Lotbinière
Party	Candidate	Votes
Liberal	Edmond Fortier	1,870
Conservative	Wilfrid Laliberté	1,520
