= Joshua Newton Freeman =

Canadian politician

Joshua Newton Freeman (October 6, 1816 – November 22, 1912) was a merchant and political figure in Nova Scotia, Canada. He represented Queens in the House of Commons of Canada from 1887 to 1891 as a Liberal-Conservative member.

He was born in Liverpool, Nova Scotia. Freeman was married three times: to Sarah Elizabeth, the daughter of Queen's County MLA John Campbell, to Elizabeth Moody and to the widow Mary Mills. Freeman was high sheriff for Queens County from 1864 to 1882. He was an unsuccessful candidate for the House of Commons in 1882 and 1891.

== Electoral record ==
1882 Canadian federal election: Queens
Party	Candidate	Votes
Liberal	James Fraser Forbes	692
Liberal–Conservative	Joshua Newton Freeman	560

1887 Canadian federal election: Queens
Party	Candidate	Votes
Liberal–Conservative	Joshua Newton Freeman	824
Liberal	J.M. Mack	809

1891 Canadian federal election: Queens
Party	Candidate	Votes
Liberal	Francis Gordon Forbes	867
Liberal–Conservative	Joshua Newton Freeman	766
