= Thomas Vien =

Canadian politician

The Honourable Thomas Vien PC, QC, LL.D
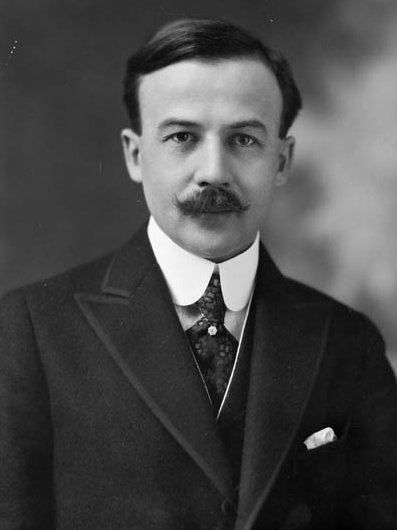

Member of the Canadian Parliament for Lotbinière
- In office 1917–1925
- Preceded by: Edmond Fortier
- Succeeded by: Joseph-Achille Verville

Member of the Canadian Parliament for Outremont
- In office 1935–1942
- Preceded by: District was created in 1933
- Succeeded by: Léo Richer Laflèche

Senator for De Lorimier, Quebec
- In office 5 October 1942 – 1 April 1968
- Appointed by: William Lyon Mackenzie King
- Preceded by: Raoul Dandurand
- Succeeded by: Raymond Eudes

Personal details
- Born: 19 July 1881 Lauzon, Quebec
- Died: 18 November 1972 (aged 91)
- Party: Liberal
- Profession: Solicitor and barrister, lawyer, politician

Thomas Vien, PC QC (19 July 1881 – 18 November 1972) was a Canadian politician.

Born in Lauzon, Quebec on 19 July 1881. He studied at the Royal Military College of Canada in Kingston, Ontario, then studied law at the Collège de Lévis. After, he studied law at the Université Laval. He was called to the Quebec Bar in 1905. He practiced with several law firms before becoming senior partner of Vien, Paré, Gould and Vien, of Montreal, Quebec.

He was first elected to the House of Commons of Canada for the Quebec riding of Lotbinière as a Laurier Liberal in the 1917 federal election. He was re-elected in 1921 but did not run in 1925. From 1922 to 1923, he served as chairman of the House of Commons Public Accounts Committee. From 1924 to 1925, he was chairman of the Banking and Commerce Committee. From 1925 to 1931, he was the deputy chief commissioner of the Board of Railway Commissioners for Canada.

After returning to his legal practice, he was elected in 1935 federal election for the riding of Outremont. From 1936 to 1940, he served as chairman of the Standing Committee on Railways, Canals and Telegraph Lines.

He was re-elected in 1940. From 1940 to 1942, he was the Deputy Speaker and Chairman of Committees of the Whole of the House of Commons. In 1942, he was appointed to the Senate of Canada representing the senatorial division of De Lorimier, Quebec. From 1943 to 1945, he was the Speaker of the Senate of Canada. At the age of 87, in 1968, he resigned his senate seat. He died four years later in Montreal.

== electoral record ==
1917 Canadian federal election: Lotbinière
Party	Candidate	Votes
Opposition (Laurier Liberals)	Thomas Vien	3,896
Government (Unionist)	Marie Joseph Émile Rousseau	164

1921 Canadian federal election: Lotbinière
Party	Candidate	Votes
Liberal	Thomas Vien	5,179
Progressive	Henri Lafleur	2,370
