= Lotbinière (federal electoral district) =

Former federal electoral district in Quebec, Canada

Quebec electoral district

Defunct federal electoral district
- Legislature: House of Commons
- District created: 1867
- District abolished: 2003
- First contested: 1867
- Last contested: 2000

Lotbinière (French pronunciation: [lɔtbinjɛʁ]; later known as Lotbinière—L'Érable) was a federal electoral district in Quebec, Canada, that was represented in the House of Commons of Canada from 1867 to 2004.

It was created by the British North America Act 1867. It was renamed "Lotbinière—L'Érable" in 2000, and was abolished in 2003 when it was redistributed between Lotbinière—Chutes-de-la-Chaudière, Mégantic—L'Érable, Richelieu and Richmond—Arthabaska ridings.

== Geography ==
It consisted initially of the County of Lotbinière.

In 1876, the Parish of St. Sévérin was transferred to the County of Beauce for the purposes of representation in the House of Commons.

In 1924, it was defined again as consisting of the County of Lotbinière.

In 1933, the following areas were added:

- from the county of Nicolet: the municipalities of Lemieux, St-Pierre Les-Becquets, Ste-Cécile-de-Lévrard, Ste-Sophie-de-Lévrard, Ste-Marie-de-Blandford, St-Joseph-de-Blandford and the village of Manseau;
- from the county of Lévis: the municipalities of St-Etienne-de-Lauzon, St-Lambert-de-Lauzon, St-Nicholas, St-Nicholas Sud, the village of St-Rédempteur;
- from the county of Mégantic: the village of Lyster and the municipalities of Ste-Anastasie-de-Nelson, Nelson, Leeds, Leeds East, St-Jacques-de-Leeds;
- from the county of Beauce: the municipalities of St-Elzéar and St-Séverin.

In 1947, it was defined as consisting of:

- the county of Lotbinière;
- in the county of Nicolet: the municipalities of Lemieux, St. Pierre-les-Becquets, Ste. Cécile-de-Lévrard, Ste-Sophie-de-Lévrard, Ste. Marie de-Blandford, St. Joseph-de-Blandford and the villages of Manseau and Les Becquets;
- in the county of Mégantic: the village of Lyster and the municipalities of Nelson and Ste. Anastasie-de-Nelson; and
- in the county of Arthabaska: the municipality of St. Louis-de-Blandford.

In 1966, it was defined as consisting of:

- the Towns of Arthabaska, Princeville, Victoriaville and Warwick;
- in the County of Arthabaska: the village municipalities of Daveluyville and Norbertville; the parish municipalities of Saint-Albert-de-Warwick, Sainte-Anne-du-Sault, Saint-Christophe-d'Arthabaska, Sainte-Élisabeth-de-Warwick, Saint-Eusèbe-de-Stanfold, Saint-Louis-de-Blandford, Saint-Norbert-d'Arthabaska, Saint-Rosaire and Sainte-Victorie-d'Arthabaska; the township municipalities of Maddington and Warwick; the municipalities of Saint-Jacques-de-Horton and Saint-Valère;
- in the County of Lotbinière: the village municipalities of Deschaillons, Deschaillons-sur-Saint Laurent, Fortierville, Laurier-Station, Leclercville, Lotbinière, Sainte-Croix and Saint-Flavien; the parish municipalities of Notre-Dame-du-Sacré-Coeur-d'Issoudun, Saint-Antoine-de-Tilly, Sainte-Croix, Saint-Édouard-de-Lotbinière, Sainte-Emmélie, Saint-Flavien, Saint-Jacques-de-Parisville, Saint-Louis-de-Lotbinière, Saint-Octave-de-Dosquet and Sainte-Philomène-de-Fortierville; the municipalities of Sainte-Françoise, Saint-Janvier-de-Joly, Val-Alain and Villeroy; and
- in the County of Nicolet: the village municipalities of Aston-Junction, Les Becquets, Manseau, Sainte-Marie and Saint-Sylvère; the parish municipalities of Sainte-Cécile-de-Lévrard, Saint-Joseph-de-Blandford, Sainte-Marie-de-Blandford, Saint-Pierreles-Becquets, Saint-Raphaël south part, Saint-Samuel, Sainte-Sophie-de-Lévrard and Saint-Sylvère; the municipalities of Lemieux and Sainte-Eulalie.

In 1976, it was defined as consisting of:

- the Towns of Arthabaska, Princeville, Victoriaville and Warwick;
- in the County of Arthabaska: the village municipalities of Daveluyville and Norbertville; the parish municipalities of Saint-Albert-de-Warwick, Sainte-Anne-du-Sault, Saint-Christophe-d'Arthabaska, Sainte-Élisabeth-de-Warwick, Saint-Louis-de-Blandford, Saint-Norbert-d'Arthabaska, Saint Rosaire and Sainte-Victorie-d'Arthabaska; the township municipalities of Maddington and Warwick; the municipalities of Saint-Jacques-de-Horton and Saint-Valère;
- in the County of Lotbinière: the village municipalities of Deschaillons, Deschaillons-sur-Saint Laurent, Fortierville, Laurier-Station, Leclercville, Lotbinière, Sainte-Croix and Saint-Flavien; the parish municipalities of Notre-Dame-du-Sacré-Coeur-d'Issoudun, Saint-Antoine-de-Tilly, Sainte-Croix, Saint-Édouard-de-Lotbinière, Sainte-Emmélie, Saint-Flavien, Saint-Jacques-de-Parisville, Saint-Louis-de-Lotbinière, Saint-Octave-de-Dosquet and Sainte-Philomène-de-Fortierville; the municipalities of Saint-Apollinaire, Sainte-Françoise, Saint-Janvier-de-Joly, Val-Alain and Villeroy;
- in the County of Nicolet: the village municipalities of Aston-Junction, Les Becquets, Manseau, Sainte-Marie and Saint-Sylvère; the parish municipalities of Sainte-Cécile-de-Lévrard, Saint-Joseph-de-Blandford, Sainte-Marie-de-Blandford, Saint-Pierreles-Becquets, Saint-Raphaël (south part,) Saint-Samuel, Sainte-Sophie-de-Lévrard and Saint-Sylvère; the municipalities of Lemieux and Sainte-Eulalie.

In 1987, it was defined as consisting of:

- the towns of Arthabaska, Princeville, Victoriaville and Warwick;
- the County of Arthabaska excluding the following: the parish municipalities of Saint-Rémi-de-Tangwick and Tingwick; the Township Municipality of Chester-Est; the municipalities of Chester-Nord, Chesterville and Trois-Lacs;
- the County of Lotbinière excluding the following: the village municipalities of Sainte-Agathe and Saint-Sylvestre; the parish municipalities of Sainte-Agathe, Saint-Narcisse-de-Beaurivage and Saint-Sylvestre;
- in the County of Drummond: the Village Municipality of Kingsey Falls; the municipality of Kingsey Falls;
- in the County of Nicolet: the village municipalities of Les Becauets and Manseau; the parish municipalities of Sainte-Cécile-de-Lévrard, Sainte-Sophie-de-Lévrard, Saint-Joseph-de-Blandford, Saint-Pierreles-Becquets and Saint-Samuel; the municipalities of Lemieux, Sainte-Eulalie, Sainte-Marie-de-Blandford and Saint-Sylvère.

In 1996, it was defined as consisting of:

- the cities of Plessisville and Princeville;
- the county regional municipalities of L'Érable and Lotbinière;
- the County Regional Municipality of Bécancour, excepting the City of Bécancour and Wôlinak Indian Reserve No. 11;
- in the County Regional Municipality of Arthabaska: the Village Municipality of Daveluyville; the parish municipalities of Saint-Louis-de-Blanford, Saint-Rosaire and Sainte-Anne-du-Sault; the Township Municipality of Maddington; the Municipality of Saint-Valère; and
- in the County Regional Municipality of Les Chutes-de-la-Chaudière: the Parish Municipality of Saint-Lambert-de-Lauzon.

== Members of Parliament ==
This riding elected the following members of Parliament:

| Parliament | Years | Member | Party |
|---|---|---|---|
Lotbinière
| 1st | 1867–1872 | Henri-Gustave Joly de Lotbinière | Liberal |
| 2nd | 1872–1874 | Henri-Gustave Joly de Lotbinière | Liberal |
| 3rd | 1874–1878 | Henri Bernier | Liberal |
| 4th | 1878–1882 | Côme Isaïe Rinfret | Liberal |
| 5th | 1882–1887 | Côme Isaïe Rinfret | Liberal |
| 6th | 1887–1891 | Côme Isaïe Rinfret | Liberal |
| 7th | 1891–1896 | Côme Isaïe Rinfret | Liberal |
| 8th | 1896–1899 | Côme Isaïe Rinfret | Liberal |
| 8th | 1900–1900 | Edmond Fortier | Liberal |
| 9th | 1900–1904 | Edmond Fortier | Liberal |
| 10th | 1904–1908 | Edmond Fortier | Liberal |
| 11th | 1908–1909 | Edmond Fortier | Liberal |
| 11th | 1909–1911 | Edmond Fortier | Liberal |
| 12th | 1911–1917 | Edmond Fortier | Liberal |
| 13th | 1917–1921 | Thomas Vien | Opposition (Laurier Liberals) |
| 14th | 1921–1925 | Thomas Vien | Liberal |
| 15th | 1925–1926 | Joseph-Achille Verville | Liberal |
| 16th | 1926–1930 | Joseph-Achille Verville | Liberal |
| 17th | 1930–1935 | Joseph-Achille Verville | Liberal |
| 18th | 1935–1937 | Joseph-Achille Verville | Liberal |
| 18th | 1937–1940 | Joseph-Napoléon Francoeur | Liberal |
| 19th | 1940–1945 | Hugues Lapointe | Liberal |
| 20th | 1945–1949 | Hugues Lapointe | Liberal |
| 21st | 1949–1953 | Hugues Lapointe | Liberal |
| 22nd | 1953–1957 | Hugues Lapointe | Liberal |
| 23rd | 1957–1958 | Raymond O'Hurley | Progressive Conservative |
| 24th | 1958–1962 | Raymond O'Hurley | Progressive Conservative |
| 25th | 1962–1963 | Raymond O'Hurley | Progressive Conservative |
| 26th | 1963–1965 | Auguste Choquette | Liberal |
| 27th | 1965–1968 | Auguste Choquette | Liberal |
| 28th | 1968–1971 | André-Gilles Fortin | Ralliement créditiste |
| 28th | 1971–1972 | André-Gilles Fortin | Social Credit |
| 29th | 1972–1974 | André-Gilles Fortin | Social Credit |
| 30th | 1974–1977 | André-Gilles Fortin | Social Credit |
| 30th | 1978–1979 | Richard Janelle | Social Credit |
| 31st | 1979–1979 | Richard Janelle | Social Credit |
| 31st | 1979–1980 | Richard Janelle | Progressive Conservative |
| 32nd | 1980–1984 | Jean-Guy Dubois | Liberal |
| 33rd | 1984–1988 | Maurice Tremblay | Progressive Conservative |
| 34th | 1988–1993 | Maurice Tremblay | Progressive Conservative |
| 35th | 1993–1997 | Jean Landry | Bloc Québécois |
| 36th | 1997–2000 | Odina Desrochers | Bloc Québécois |
Lotbinière—L'Érable
| 37th | 2000–2004 | Odina Desrochers | Bloc Québécois |
Riding dissolved into Lotbinière—Chutes-de-la-Chaudière, Mégantic—L'Érable, Richelieu and Richmond—Arthabaska

== Election results ==
=== Lotbinière ===
1867 Canadian federal election
| Party | Candidate | Votes |
|---|---|---|
| Liberal | Henri-Gustave Joly de Lotbinière | acclaimed |
Source: Canadian Elections Database

1872 Canadian federal election
| Party | Candidate | Votes |
|---|---|---|
| Liberal | Henri-Gustave Joly | acclaimed |
Source: Canadian Elections Database

1874 Canadian federal election
| Party | Candidate | Votes |
|---|---|---|
| Liberal | Henry Bernier | 776 |
| Unknown | L.G. Houle | 288 |
Source: lop.parl.ca

1878 Canadian federal election
| Party | Candidate | Votes |
|---|---|---|
| Liberal | Côme Isaïe Rinfret | 1,083 |
| Unknown | L.A. Coté | 972 |

1882 Canadian federal election
| Party | Candidate | Votes |
|---|---|---|
| Liberal | Côme Isaïe Rinfret | 1,025 |
| Unknown | A.D. Ross | 812 |

1887 Canadian federal election
| Party | Candidate | Votes |
|---|---|---|
| Liberal | Côme Isaïe Rinfret | 1,464 |
| Conservative | Angus Baker | 955 |

1891 Canadian federal election
| Party | Candidate | Votes |
|---|---|---|
| Liberal | Côme Isaïe Rinfret | acclaimed |

1896 Canadian federal election
| Party | Candidate | Votes |
|---|---|---|
| Liberal | Côme Isaïe Rinfret | 1,620 |
| Conservative | I.A.P. Lord | 1,214 |

1900 Canadian federal election
| Party | Candidate | Votes |
|---|---|---|
| Liberal | Edmond Fortier | 1,376 |
| Liberal | F. Boisvert | 805 |
| Conservative | Lawrence Stafford | 795 |

By-election on 25 January 1900 Rinfret was appointed inspector of Inland Revenue, 25 August 1899
| Party | Candidate | Votes |
| Liberal | Edmond Fortier | 1,496 |
| Conservative | J.H. Boisvert | 1,324 |

1904 Canadian federal election
| Party | Candidate | Votes |
|---|---|---|
| Liberal | Edmond Fortier | 1,670 |
| Conservative | Napoléon Bergeron | 799 |

1908 Canadian federal election
| Party | Candidate | Votes |
|---|---|---|
| Liberal | Edmond Fortier | 2,304 |
| Conservative | Louis Philippe Pelletier | 1,459 |

By-election on 26 October 1909 Due to the election being declared void on 29 September 1909
| Party | Candidate | Votes |
| Liberal | Edmond Fortier | 1,379 |
| Conservative | Théodore Dubé | 1,076 |

1911 Canadian federal election
| Party | Candidate | Votes |
|---|---|---|
| Liberal | Edmond Fortier | 1,870 |
| Conservative | Wilfrid Laliberté | 1,520 |

1917 Canadian federal election
| Party | Candidate | Votes |
|---|---|---|
| Opposition (Laurier Liberals) | Thomas Vien | 3,896 |
| Government (Unionist) | Marie Joseph Émile Rousseau | 164 |

1921 Canadian federal election
| Party | Candidate | Votes |
|---|---|---|
| Liberal | Thomas Vien | 5,179 |
| Progressive | Henri Lafleur | 2,370 |

1925 Canadian federal election
| Party | Candidate | Votes |
|---|---|---|
| Liberal | Joseph-Achille Verville | 3,819 |
| Conservative | Joseph Adalbert Pouliot | 1,402 |
| Liberal | Omer Langlois | 1,358 |

1926 Canadian federal election
| Party | Candidate | Votes |
|---|---|---|
| Liberal | Joseph-Achille Verville | 4,650 |
| Independent | Joseph Uldéric Paris | 3,345 |

1930 Canadian federal election
| Party | Candidate | Votes |
|---|---|---|
| Liberal | Joseph-Achille Verville | 5,068 |
| Conservative | Wilfrid Laliberté | 3,863 |
Source: lop.parl.ca

1935 Canadian federal election
| Party | Candidate | Votes |
|---|---|---|
| Liberal | Joseph-Achille Verville | 9,768 |
| Conservative | Apollinaire Castonguay | 5,373 |

By-election on 27 December 1937 Due to Achille Verville's death, 20 November 1937
| Party | Candidate | Votes |
| Liberal | Joseph-Napoléon Francoeur | 9,910 |
| Independent | Paul Bouchard | 5,239 |

1940 Canadian federal election
| Party | Candidate | Votes |
|---|---|---|
| Liberal | Hugues Lapointe | 8,983 |
| Independent | Gérard Laliberté | 4,627 |

1945 Canadian federal election
| Party | Candidate | Votes |
|---|---|---|
| Liberal | Hugues Lapointe | 10,122 |
| Independent | Omer Langlois | 5,813 |

1949 Canadian federal election
| Party | Candidate | Votes |
|---|---|---|
| Liberal | Hugues Lapointe | 8,849 |
| Independent | Adrien Lambert | 6,430 |
| Union des électeurs | BenjaminDemers | 288 |
| Progressive Conservative | Marie-Joseph-Émile Rousseau | 72 |

1953 Canadian federal election
| Party | Candidate | Votes |
|---|---|---|
| Liberal | Hugues Lapointe | 9,047 |
| Progressive Conservative | Rolland Legendre | 6,879 |

1957 Canadian federal election
| Party | Candidate | Votes |
|---|---|---|
| Progressive Conservative | Raymond O'Hurley | 8,372 |
| Liberal | Hugues Lapointe | 7,823 |

1958 Canadian federal election
| Party | Candidate | Votes |
|---|---|---|
| Progressive Conservative | Raymond O'Hurley | 9,610 |
| Liberal | Paul Biron | 6,432 |

1962 Canadian federal election
| Party | Candidate | Votes |
|---|---|---|
| Progressive Conservative | Raymond O'Hurley | 6,183 |
| Liberal | Auguste Choquette | 5,581 |
| Social Credit | Adélard Larose | 4,287 |

1963 Canadian federal election
| Party | Candidate | Votes |
|---|---|---|
| Liberal | Auguste Choquette | 6,957 |
| Progressive Conservative | Raymond O'Hurley | 5,449 |
| Social Credit | Gérard Lamontagne | 3,442 |

1965 Canadian federal election
| Party | Candidate | Votes |
|---|---|---|
| Liberal | Auguste Choquette | 6,238 |
| Progressive Conservative | Raymond O'Hurley | 5,160 |
| Ralliement créditiste | Adrien Lambert | 3,481 |

1968 Canadian federal election
| Party | Candidate | Votes |
|---|---|---|
| Ralliement créditiste | André-Gilles Fortin | 11,302 |
| Liberal | Fernand Beaudet | 9,743 |
| Progressive Conservative | Gérard Ouellet | 8,215 |
| New Democratic | Marcel Laurin | 732 |

1972 Canadian federal election
| Party | Candidate | Votes |
|---|---|---|
| Social Credit | André-Gilles Fortin | 21,366 |
| Liberal | Henri Brunelle | 9,836 |
| Progressive Conservative | Pierre Beaudet | 4,258 |

1974 Canadian federal election
| Party | Candidate | Votes |
|---|---|---|
| Social Credit | André-Gilles Fortin | 21,448 |
| Liberal | Normand Bégin | 10,885 |
| Progressive Conservative | Victor Paul | 2,833 |
| New Democratic | Nicole Drapeau | 504 |
lop.parl.ca

By-election on 16 October 1978 Due to André-Gilles Fortin's death, 25 June 1977
| Party | Candidate | Votes |
| Social Credit | Richard Janelle | 16,358 |
| Liberal | Jean-Guy Dubois | 11,955 |
| Progressive Conservative | Jacinthe Lavigne | 6,916 |
| New Democratic | Jean-Denis Lavigne | 902 |

1979 Canadian federal election
| Party | Candidate | Votes |
|---|---|---|
| Social Credit | Richard Janelle | 20,083 |
| Liberal | Jean-Guy Dubois | 16,958 |
| Progressive Conservative | Ronald Robichaud | 3,639 |
| New Democratic | Jean-Denis Lavigne | 1,159 |
| Union populaire | Réal Turgeon | 202 |

1980 Canadian federal election
| Party | Candidate | Votes |
|---|---|---|
| Liberal | Jean-Guy Dubois | 24,780 |
| Progressive Conservative | Richard Janelle | 9,117 |
| Social Credit | Roland Beaulieu | 3,707 |
| New Democratic | Jean-Denis Lavigne | 3,041 |
| Rhinoceros | Paul Régimbald | 945 |
| Independent | Michel Dumont | 201 |
| Union populaire | François Laberge | 75 |
| Marxist–Leninist | Nicole Éthier | 59 |
lop.parl.ca

1984 Canadian federal election
| Party | Candidate | Votes |
|---|---|---|
| Progressive Conservative | Maurice Tremblay | 22,584 |
| Liberal | Jean-Guy Dubois | 20,202 |
| New Democratic | Gaston Coté | 1,963 |
| Rhinoceros | André Sévigny | 909 |
| Parti nationaliste | Nelson Bouffard | 881 |

1988 Canadian federal election
| Party | Candidate | Votes |
|---|---|---|
| Progressive Conservative | Maurice Tremblay | 26,585 |
| Liberal | Pierre Lajeunesse | 15,067 |
| New Democratic | Richard Lacoursière | 8,782 |

1993 Canadian federal election
| Party | Candidate | Votes |
|---|---|---|
| Bloc Québécois | Jean Landry | 26,763 |
| Liberal | Michael Provencher | 14,659 |
| Progressive Conservative | Jacques Le Sieur | 7,387 |
| New Democratic | André-Pierre Robitaille | 714 |

1997 Canadian federal election
| Party | Candidate | Votes |
|---|---|---|
| Bloc Québécois | Odina Desrochers | 13,069 |
| Liberal | Pierre Savoie | 10,062 |
| Progressive Conservative | Gaston Beaudet | 9,690 |
| Independent | Jean Landry | 1,988 |
| New Democratic | Dominique Vaillancourt | 445 |

=== Lotbinière—L'Érable ===
2000 Canadian federal election
| Party | Candidate | Votes |
|---|---|---|
| Bloc Québécois | Odina Desrochers | 15,351 |
| Liberal | Luc Dastous | 12,563 |
| Alliance | Pierre Allard | 2,827 |
| Progressive Conservative | Jean Landry | 2,357 |
| New Democratic | Dominique Vaillancourt | 538 |

== See also ==
- List of Canadian electoral districts
- Historical federal electoral districts of Canada
