= 19th Canadian Parliament =

1940–1945 legislative term

- Majority parliament
- May. 16, 1940 – Apr. 16, 1945

Parliament leaders
- Prime minister: William Lyon Mackenzie King; Oct. 23, 1935 – Nov. 15, 1948
- Cabinet: 16th Canadian Ministry
- Leader of the Opposition: Richard Hanson; 14 May 1940 – 1 January 1943
- Gordon Graydon; 1 January 1943 – 10 June 1945

Party caucuses
- Government: Liberal Party
- Opposition: National Government (Canada) & Conservative Party
- Crossbench: Co-operative Commonwealth Federation
- Social Credit Party
- Liberal-Progressive

House of Commons
- Seating arrangements of the House of Commons
- Speaker of the Commons: James Allison Glen; 16 May 1940 – 5 September 1945
- Government House leader: Ian Alistair Mackenzie; 14 October 1944 – 30 April 1948
- Members: 245 MP seats List of members

Senate
- Speaker of the Senate: Georges Parent; 9 May 1940 – 14 December 1942
- Thomas Vien; 23 January 1943 – 23 August 1945
- Government Senate leader: Raoul Dandurand; 23 October 1935 – 11 March 1942
- James Horace King; 26 May 1942 – 24 August 1945
- Opposition Senate leader: Arthur Meighen; 22 October 1935 – 16 January 1942
- Charles Colquhoun Ballantyne; 16 January 1942 – 11 September 1945

Sovereign
- Monarch: George VI; 11 December 1936 – 6 February 1952
- Governor general: Alexander Cambridge; 21 June 1940 – 12 April 1946

Sessions
- 1st session 16 May 1940 – 5 November 1940
- 2nd session 7 November 1940 – 21 January 1942
- 3rd session 22 January 1942 – 27 January 1943
- 4th session 28 January 1943 – 26 January 1944
- 5th session 27 January 1944 – 31 January 1945
- 6th session 19 March 1945 – 16 April 1945
← 18th	→ 20th

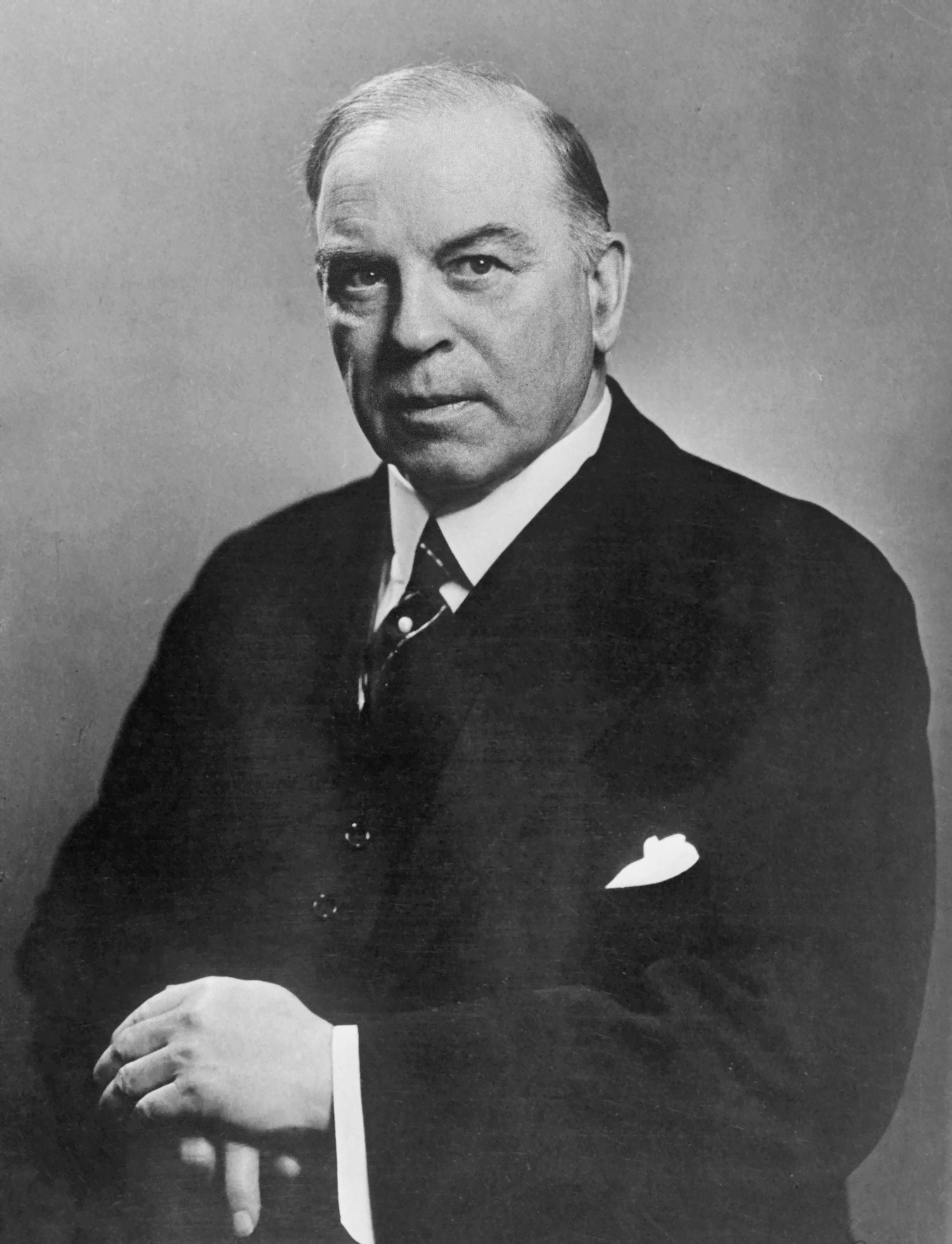
William Lyon Mackenzie King (pictured here in 1942) was Prime Minister during the 18th Canadian Parliament.

The 19th Canadian Parliament was in session from 16 May 1940, until 16 April 1945. The membership was set by the 1940 federal election on 26 March 1940, and it changed only somewhat due to resignations and by-elections until it was dissolved prior to the 1945 election.

It was controlled by a Liberal Party majority under Prime Minister William Lyon Mackenzie King and the 16th Canadian Ministry. The Official Opposition was the so-called "National Government" party (the name which the Conservatives ran under in the 1940 election), led in the House by Richard Hanson and Gordon Graydon consecutively as the three successive national leaders of the party, Robert Manion, Arthur Meighen and John Bracken did not have seats in the House of Commons. With the selection of Bracken as national leader in December 1942, the party became known as the Progressive Conservatives.

The Speaker was James Allison Glen. See also List of Canadian electoral districts 1933–1947 for a list of the ridings in this parliament.

There were six sessions of the 19th Parliament.

On 30 December 1941, United Kingdom Prime Minister Winston Churchill addressed the House of Commons and Senate in Centre Block in his "Some chicken! Some neck!" speech.

== List of members ==
Following is a full list of members of the nineteenth Parliament listed first by province, then by electoral district.

Key:

- Party leaders are italicized.
- Parliamentary assistants is indicated by "‡".
- Cabinet ministers are in **boldface**.
- The Prime Minister is **both**.
- The Speaker is indicated by "(†)".

Electoral districts denoted by an asterisk (*) indicates that district was represented by two members.

=== Alberta ===
Electoral district	Name	Party	First elected/previously elected	No. of terms
Acadia	Victor Quelch	Social Credit	1935	2nd term
Athabaska	Joseph Miville Dechene	Liberal	1940	1st term
Battle River	Robert Fair	Social Credit	1935	2nd term
Bow River	Charles Edward Johnston	Social Credit	1935	2nd term
Calgary East	George Henry Ross	Liberal	1940	1st term
Calgary West	Manley Justin Edwards	Liberal	1940	1st term
Camrose	James Alexander Marshall	Social Credit	1935	2nd term
Edmonton East	Frederick Clayton Casselman (died 20 March 1941)	Liberal	1940	1st term
Edmonton East	Cora Taylor Casselman (by-election of 1941-06-02)	Liberal	1941	1st term
Edmonton West	**James Angus MacKinnon**	Liberal	1935	2nd term
Jasper—Edson	Walter Frederick Kuhl	New Democracy	1935	2nd term
Lethbridge	John Horne Blackmore	Social Credit	1935	2nd term
Macleod	Ernest George Hansell	Social Credit	1935	2nd term
Medicine Hat	Frederick William Gershaw	Liberal	1925, 1940	4th term*
Peace River	John Sissons	Liberal	1940	1st term
Red Deer	Frederick Davis Shaw	Social Credit	1940	1st term
Vegreville	Anthony Hlynka	Social Credit	1940	1st term
Wetaskiwin	Norman Jaques	Social Credit	1935	2nd term

=== British Columbia ===
Electoral district	Name	Party	First elected/previously elected	No. of terms
Cariboo	James Gray Turgeon	Liberal	1935	2nd term
Comox—Alberni	Alan Webster Neill	Independent	1921	6th term
Fraser Valley	George Cruickshank	Liberal	1940	1st term
Kamloops	Thomas O'Neill	Liberal	1935	2nd term
Kootenay East	George MacKinnon	National Government	1940	1st term
Kootenay East	George MacKinnon	Progressive Conservative	1940	1st term
Kootenay West	William Esling	National Government	1925	5th term
Kootenay West	William Esling	Progressive Conservative	1925	5th term
Nanaimo	Alan Chambers	Liberal	1940	1st term
New Westminster	Thomas Reid	Liberal	1930	3rd term
Skeena	Olof Hanson	Liberal	1930	3rd term
Vancouver—Burrard	Gerry McGeer	Liberal	1935	2nd term
Vancouver Centre	**Ian Alistair Mackenzie**	Liberal	1930	3rd term
Vancouver East	Angus MacInnis	C.C.F.	1930	3rd term
Vancouver North	James Sinclair	Liberal	1940	1st term
Vancouver South	Howard Charles Green	National Government	1935	2nd term
Vancouver South	Howard Charles Green	Progressive Conservative	1935	2nd term
Victoria	Robert Mayhew	Liberal	1937	2nd term
Yale	Grote Stirling	National Government	1924	6th term
Yale	Grote Stirling	Progressive Conservative	1924	6th term

=== Manitoba ===
Electoral district	Name	Party	First elected/previously elected	No. of terms
Brandon	James Ewen Matthews	Liberal	1938	2nd term
Churchill	**Thomas Crerar**	Liberal	1917, (Note: Marquette (First elected as a Unionist/Progressive)) 1930, (Note: Brandon) 1935	5th term*
Dauphin	William John Ward	Liberal	1921, 1935	5th term*
Lisgar	Howard Winkler	Liberal	1935	2nd term
Macdonald	William Gilbert Weir	Liberal-Progressive	1930	3rd term
Marquette	James Allison Glen (†)	Liberal-Progressive	1926, 1935	3rd term*
Neepawa	Frederick Donald MacKenzie	Liberal	1935	2nd term
Portage la Prairie	Harry Leader	Liberal	1921, (Note: First elected as a Progressive) 1935	3rd term*
Provencher	René Jutras	Liberal	1940	1st term
Selkirk	**Joseph Thorarinn Thorson** (until 6 October 1942 emoulment appointment)	Liberal	1926, 1935	3rd term*
Selkirk	William Bryce (by-election of 9 August 1943)	C.C.F.	1943	1st term
Souris	J. Arthur Ross	National Government	1940	1st term
Souris	J. Arthur Ross	Progressive Conservative	1940	1st term
Springfield	John Mouat Turner	Liberal	1935	2nd term
Springfield	John Mouat Turner died on 24 February 1945	Vacant		
St. Boniface	John Power Howden	Liberal	1925	5th term
Winnipeg North Centre	J. S. Woodsworth (died 21 March 1942)	C.C.F.	1921	6th term
Winnipeg North Centre	Stanley Knowles (by-election of 1942-11-30)	C.C.F.	1942	1st term
Winnipeg North	Charles Stephen Booth	Liberal	1940	1st term
Winnipeg South	Leslie Mutch	Liberal	1935	2nd term
Winnipeg South Centre	Ralph Maybank	Liberal	1935	2nd term

=== New Brunswick ===
Electoral district	Name	Party	First elected/previously elected	No. of terms
Charlotte	Burton Hill	Liberal	1935	2nd term
Gloucester	Clarence Joseph Veniot	Liberal	1936	2nd term
Kent	Aurel Léger	Liberal	1940	1st term
Northumberland	Joseph Leonard O'Brien	National Government	1940	1st term
Northumberland	Joseph Leonard O'Brien	Progressive Conservative	1940	1st term
Restigouche—Madawaska	**Joseph Enoil Michaud**	Liberal	1933	3rd term
Royal	Alfred Johnson Brooks	National Government	1935	2nd term
Royal	Alfred Johnson Brooks	Progressive Conservative	1935	2nd term
St. John—Albert	King Hazen	National Government	1940	1st term
St. John—Albert	King Hazen	Progressive Conservative	1940	1st term
Victoria—Carleton	Heber Harold Hatfield	National Government	1940	1st term
Victoria—Carleton	Heber Harold Hatfield	Progressive Conservative	1940	1st term
Westmorland	Henry Read Emmerson	Liberal	1935	2nd term
York—Sunbury	Richard Hanson	National Government	1921, 1940	6th term*
York—Sunbury	Richard Hanson	Progressive Conservative	1921, 1940	6th term*

=== Nova Scotia ===
Electoral district	Name	Party	First elected/previously elected	No. of terms
Antigonish—Guysborough	J. Ralph Kirk	Liberal	1936	2nd term
Cape Breton North and Victoria	Matthew Maclean	Liberal	1937	2nd term
Cape Breton South	Clarence Gillis	C.C.F.	1940	1st term
Colchester—Hants	Gordon Purdy	Liberal	1935	2nd term
Cumberland	Percy Chapman Black	National Government	1940	1st term
Cumberland	Percy Chapman Black	Progressive Conservative	1940	1st term
Digby—Annapolis—Kings	**J. L. Ilsley**	Liberal	1926	4th term
Halifax*	Gordon B. Isnor	Liberal	1935	2nd term
Halifax*	William Chisholm Macdonald ‡	Liberal	1940	1st term
Inverness—Richmond	Moses Elijah McGarry	Liberal	1940	1st term
Pictou	Henry Byron McCulloch	Liberal	1935	2nd term
Queens—Lunenburg	John James Kinley	Liberal	1935	2nd term
Shelburne—Yarmouth—Clare	Vincent Pottier	Liberal	1935	2nd term

=== Ontario ===
Electoral district	Name	Party	First elected/previously elected	No. of terms
Algoma East	Thomas Farquhar	Liberal	1935	2nd term
Algoma West	George E. Nixon	Liberal	1940	1st term
Brantford City	William Ross Macdonald	Liberal	1935	2nd term
Brant	George Ernest Wood	Liberal	1935	2nd term
Broadview	Thomas Langton Church	National Government	1921, (Note: Toronto North/Toronto Northwest) 1934	6th term*
Broadview	Thomas Langton Church	Progressive Conservative	1921, 1934	6th term*
Bruce	William Rae Tomlinson	Liberal	1935	2nd term
Carleton	Alonzo Hyndman (died 9 April 1940)	National Government	1935	2nd term
Carleton	George Russell Boucher (by-election of 1940-08-19)	Conservative	1940	1st term
Carleton	George Russell Boucher (by-election of 1940-08-19)	Progressive Conservative	1940	1st term
Cochrane	Joseph-Arthur Bradette	Liberal	1926	4th term
Danforth	Joseph Henry Harris	Conservative	1921	6th term
Danforth	Joseph Henry Harris	Progressive Conservative	1921	6th term
Davenport	John Ritchie MacNicol	National Government	1930	3rd term
Davenport	John Ritchie MacNicol	Progressive Conservative	1930	3rd term
Dufferin—Simcoe	William Earl Rowe	National Government	1925	5th term
Dufferin—Simcoe	William Earl Rowe	Progressive Conservative	1925	5th term
Durham	Frank Rickard	Liberal	1935	2nd term
Eglinton	Frederick Hoblitzell	Liberal	1940	1st term
Elgin	Wilson Mills	Liberal	1934	3rd term
Essex East	**Paul Martin Sr.** ‡	Liberal	1935	2nd term
Essex South	Murray Clark	Liberal	1935	2nd term
Essex West	**Norman Alexander McLarty**	Liberal	1935	2nd term
Fort William	Daniel McIvor	Liberal	1935	2nd term
Frontenac—Addington	Wilbert Ross Aylesworth	National Government	1940	1st term
Frontenac—Addington	Wilbert Ross Aylesworth	Progressive Conservative	1940	1st term
Glengarry	William Burton Macdiarmid	Liberal	1940	1st term
Greenwood	Denton Massey	National Government	1935	2nd term
Greenwood	Denton Massey	Progressive Conservative	1935	2nd term
Grenville—Dundas	Arza Clair Casselman	National Government	1921, 1925	6th term*
Grenville—Dundas	Arza Clair Casselman	Progressive Conservative	1921, 1925	6th term*
Grey—Bruce	Walter Harris	Liberal	1940	1st term
Grey North	William Pattison Telford, Jr. (resigned 9 December 1944 to allow Andrew McNaughton to campaign for seat, albeit unsuccessfully)	Liberal	1926, 1935	3rd term*
Grey North	Wilfrid Garfield Case (by-election of 1945-02-05)	Progressive Conservative	1945	1st term
Haldimand	Mark Senn	Conservative	1921	6th term
Haldimand	Mark Senn	Progressive Conservative	1921	6th term
Halton	Hughes Cleaver	Liberal	1935	2nd term
Hamilton East	Thomas Hambly Ross	Liberal	1940	1st term
Hamilton West	**Colin Gibson**	Liberal	1940	1st term
Hastings—Peterborough	George Stanley White	National Government	1940	1st term
Hastings—Peterborough	George Stanley White	Progressive Conservative	1940	1st term
Hastings South	George Henry Stokes	National Government	1940	1st term
Hastings South	George Henry Stokes	Progressive Conservative	1940	1st term
High Park	Alexander James Anderson	National Government	1925	5th term
High Park	Alexander James Anderson	Progressive Conservative	1925	5th term
Huron North	Elston Cardiff	National Government	1940	1st term
Huron North	Elston Cardiff	Progressive Conservative	1940	1st term
Huron—Perth	William Henry Golding	Liberal	1932	3rd term
Kenora—Rainy River	Hugh McKinnon	Liberal	1934	3rd term
Kenora—Rainy River	Hugh McKinnon died on 10 April 1944	Vacant		
Kent	Earl Desmond	National Government	1940	1st term
Kent	Earl Desmond	Progressive Conservative	1940	1st term
Kingston City	**Norman McLeod Rogers** (died 10 June 1940)	Liberal	1935	2nd term
Kingston City	**Angus Lewis Macdonald** (by-election of 1940-08-12)	Liberal	1940	1st term
Lambton—Kent	Hugh MacKenzie	Liberal-Progressive	1935	2nd term
Lambton West	Ross Gray	Liberal	1929	4th term
Lanark	Bert Soper	Liberal	1940	1st term
Leeds	George Fulford	Liberal	1940	1st term
Lincoln	Norman Lockhart	Conservative	1935	2nd term
Lincoln	Norman Lockhart	Progressive Conservative	1935	2nd term
London	Allan Johnston	Liberal	1940	1st term
Middlesex East	Duncan Graham Ross	Liberal	1935	2nd term
Middlesex West	Robert McCubbin	Liberal	1940	1st term
Muskoka—Ontario	Stephen Furniss	Liberal	1935	2nd term
Nipissing	Raoul Hurtubise	Liberal	1930	3rd term
Norfolk	William Horace Taylor	Liberal	1926	4th term
Northumberland	William Alexander Fraser	Liberal	1930	3rd term
Ontario	William Henry Moore	Liberal	1930	3rd term
Ottawa East	Joseph Albert Pinard	Liberal	1936	2nd term
Ottawa West	George McIlraith	Liberal	1940	1st term
Oxford	Almon Rennie	Liberal	1934	3rd term
Parkdale	Herbert Alexander Bruce	National Government	1940	1st term
Parkdale	Herbert Alexander Bruce	Progressive Conservative	1940	1st term
Parry Sound	Arthur Slaght	Liberal	1935	2nd term
Peel	Gordon Graydon	National Government	1935	2nd term
Peel	Gordon Graydon	Progressive Conservative	1935	2nd term
Perth	Fred Sanderson	Liberal	1925	5th term
Peterborough West	Gordon Fraser	National Government	1940	1st term
Peterborough West	Gordon Fraser	Progressive Conservative	1940	1st term
Port Arthur	**Clarence Decatur Howe**	Liberal	1935	2nd term
Prescott	Élie-Oscar Bertrand	Liberal	1929	4th term
Prince Edward—Lennox	George Tustin	National Government	1935	2nd term
Prince Edward—Lennox	George Tustin	Progressive Conservative	1935	2nd term
Renfrew North	Ralph Warren	Liberal	1937	2nd term
Renfrew South	**James Joseph McCann**	Liberal	1935	2nd term
Rosedale	Harry Jackman	National Government	1940	1st term
Rosedale	Harry Jackman	Progressive Conservative	1940	1st term
Russell	Alfred Goulet	Liberal	1925	5th term
Simcoe East	George McLean	Liberal	1935	2nd term
Simcoe North	Duncan Fletcher McCuaig	Liberal	1935	2nd term
Spadina	Samuel Factor	Liberal	1930	3rd term
Stormont	**Lionel Chevrier** ‡	Liberal	1935	2nd term
St. Paul's	Douglas Ross	National Government	1935	2nd term
St. Paul's	Douglas Ross	Progressive Conservative	1935	2nd term
Timiskaming	Walter Little	Liberal	1935	2nd term
Trinity	Arthur Roebuck	Liberal	1940	1st term
Victoria	Bruce McNevin	Liberal	1935	2nd term
Waterloo North	William Daum Euler (until Senate appointment)	Liberal	1917	7th term
Waterloo North	Louis Orville Breithaupt (by-election of 1940-08-19)	Liberal	1940	1st term
Waterloo South	Karl Kenneth Homuth	National Government	1938	2nd term
Waterloo South	Karl Kenneth Homuth	Progressive Conservative	1938	2nd term
Welland	Arthur Damude (died 15 September 1941)	Liberal	1935	2nd term
Welland	**Humphrey Mitchell** (by-election of 1942-02-09)	Liberal	1931, (Note: Hamilton East (First elected as a Labour)) 1942	2nd term*
Wellington North	John Knox Blair	Liberal	1930	3rd term
Wellington South	Robert Gladstone	Liberal	1935	2nd term
Wentworth	Ellis Corman	Liberal	1940	1st term
York East	Robert Henry McGregor	National Government	1926	4th term
York East	Robert Henry McGregor	Progressive Conservative	1926	4th term
York North	**William Pate Mulock**	Liberal	1934	3rd term
York South	Alan Cockeram (resigned to allow Arthur Meighen to campaign for seat, albeit unsuccessfully)	National Government	1940	1st term
York South	Joseph W. Noseworthy (by-election of 1942-02-09)	C.C.F.	1942	1st term
York West	Agar Rodney Adamson	Conservative	1940	1st term
York West	Agar Rodney Adamson	Progressive Conservative	1940	1st term

=== Prince Edward Island ===
Electoral district	Name	Party	First elected/previously elected	No. of terms
King's	Thomas Vincent Grant	Liberal	1935	2nd term
Prince	**James Ralston**	Liberal	1926, (Note: Shelburne—Yarmouth (Nova Scotia)) 1940	4th term*
Queen's*	James Lester Douglas	Liberal	1940	1st term
Queen's*	Cyrus Macmillan ‡	Liberal	1940	1st term

=== Quebec ===
Electoral district	Name	Party	First elected/previously elected	No. of terms
Argenteuil	James Wright McGibbon	Liberal	1940	1st term
Beauce	Édouard Lacroix	Liberal	1925	5th term
Beauce	Édouard Lacroix	Bloc populaire canadien	1925	5th term
Beauce	Édouard Lacroix resigned on 11 July 1944 to enter provincial politics	Vacant		
Beauharnois—Laprairie	Maxime Raymond	Liberal	1925	5th term
Beauharnois—Laprairie	Maxime Raymond	Bloc populaire canadien	1925	5th term
Bellechasse	Louis-Philippe Picard	Liberal	1940	1st term
Berthier—Maskinongé	J.-Émile Ferron	Liberal	1935	2nd term
Bonaventure	Alphée Poirier	Liberal	1940	1st term
Bonaventure	Alphée Poirier died on 19 September 1944	Vacant		
Brome—Missisquoi	Maurice Hallé	Liberal	1940	1st term
Cartier	Peter Bercovitch (died 26 December 1942)	Liberal	1938	2nd term
Cartier	Fred Rose (by-election of 1943-08-09)	Labor Progressive	1943	1st term
Chambly—Rouville	Vincent Dupuis	Liberal	1929	4th term
Champlain	Hervé-Edgar Brunelle	Liberal	1935	2nd term
Chapleau	Hector Authier	Liberal	1940	1st term
Charlevoix—Saguenay	**Pierre-François Casgrain** (until 15 December 1941 emoulment appointment)	Liberal	1917	7th term
Charlevoix—Saguenay	Frédéric Dorion (by-election of 1942-11-30)	Independent	1942	1st term
Châteauguay—Huntingdon	Donald Elmer Black	Liberal	1935	2nd term
Chicoutimi	Alfred Dubuc	Liberal	1925	5th term
Compton	Joseph-Adéodat Blanchette	Liberal	1935	2nd term
Dorchester	Léonard Tremblay	Liberal	1935	2nd term
Drummond—Arthabaska	Armand Cloutier	Liberal	1940	1st term
Gaspé	Joseph Sasseville Roy	Independent Conservative	1940	1st term
Gaspé	Joseph Sasseville Roy	Independent	1940	1st term
Hochelaga	Raymond Eudes	Liberal	1940	1st term
Hull	**Alphonse Fournier**	Liberal	1930	3rd term
Jacques Cartier	Elphège Marier	Liberal	1939	2nd term
Joliette—l'Assomption—Montcalm	Charles-Édouard Ferland	Liberal	1928	4th term
Kamouraska	Louis Philippe Lizotte	Liberal	1940	1st term
Kamouraska	Louis Philippe Lizotte resigned on 24 July 1944 to enter provincial politics	Vacant		
Labelle	Maurice Lalonde	Liberal	1935	2nd term
Lake St-John—Roberval	Armand Sylvestre	Liberal	1925, 1935	4th term*
Laurier	**Ernest Bertrand**	Liberal	1935	2nd term
Laval—Two Mountains	Liguori Lacombe	Independent Liberal	1925, 1935	4th term*
Lévis	Maurice Bourget	Liberal	1940	1st term
Lotbinière	Hugues Lapointe	Liberal	1940	1st term
Maisonneuve—Rosemont	Sarto Fournier	Liberal	1935	2nd term
Matapédia—Matane	Arthur-Joseph Lapointe	Liberal	1935	2nd term
Mégantic—Frontenac	Joseph Lafontaine	Liberal	1940	1st term
Mercier	**Joseph Jean** ‡	Liberal	1932	3rd term
Montmagny—L'Islet	Léo Kemner Laflamme	Liberal	1925, 1940	3rd term*
Mount Royal	Fred Whitman	Liberal	1940	1st term
Nicolet—Yamaska	Lucien Dubois	Liberal	1930	3rd term
Outremont	Thomas Vien (resigned 5 October 1942)	Liberal	1917, 1935	4th term*
Outremont	**Léo Richer Laflèche** (by-election of 1942-11-30)	Liberal	1942	1st term
Pontiac	Wallace McDonald	Liberal	1935	2nd term
Portneuf	Pierre Gauthier	Liberal	1936	2nd term
Portneuf	Pierre Gauthier	Bloc populaire canadien	1936	2nd term
Québec—Montmorency	Wilfrid Lacroix	Liberal	1935	2nd term
Québec—Montmorency	Wilfrid Lacroix	Independent Liberal	1935	2nd term
Quebec East	**Ernest Lapointe** (died 26 November 1941)	Liberal	1904	11th term
Quebec East	**Louis St. Laurent** (by-election of 1942-02-09)	Liberal	1942	1st term
Quebec South	**Charles Gavan Power**	Liberal	1917	7th term
Quebec West and South	Charles Parent	Liberal	1935	2nd term
Quebec West and South	Charles Parent	Independent Liberal	1935	2nd term
Richelieu—Verchères	**Arthur Cardin**	Liberal	1911	8th term
Richelieu—Verchères	**Arthur Cardin**	Independent	1911	8th term
Richmond—Wolfe	James Patrick Mullins	Liberal	1935	2nd term
Rimouski	Émmanuel d'Anjou	Liberal	1917, 1940	3rd term*
Rimouski	Émmanuel d'Anjou	Bloc populaire canadien	1917, 1940	3rd term*
St. Ann	Thomas Healy	Liberal	1940	1st term
St. Antoine—Westmount	**Douglas Abbott** ‡	Liberal	1940	1st term
St. Denis	Azellus Denis	Liberal	1935	2nd term
St. Henry	Joseph-Arsène Bonnier	Liberal	1938	2nd term
St. Hyacinthe—Bagot	Adélard Fontaine	Liberal	1930	3rd term
St. Hyacinthe—Bagot	Adélard Fontaine upon being named judge on 27 July 1944	Vacant		
St. James	Eugène Durocher	Liberal	1939	2nd term
St. James	Eugène Durocher died on 10 May 1944	Vacant		
St. Johns—Iberville—Napierville	Martial Rhéaume	Liberal	1930	3rd term
St. Lawrence—St. George	**Brooke Claxton** ‡	Liberal	1940	1st term
St. Mary	Hermas Deslauriers (died 28 May 1941)	Liberal	1917	7th term
St. Mary	Gaspard Fauteux (by-election of 1942-02-09)	Liberal	1942	1st term
St-Maurice—Laflèche	Joseph-Alphida Crête	Liberal	1935	2nd term
Shefford	Joseph-Hermas Leclerc	Liberal	1935	2nd term
Sherbrooke	Maurice Gingues	Liberal	1940	1st term
Stanstead	Robert Davison (until election voided 24 May 1943)	Liberal	1935	2nd term
Stanstead	Joseph-Armand Choquette (by-election of 1943-08-09)	Bloc populaire canadien	1943	1st term
Terrebonne	Lionel Bertrand	Independent Liberal	1940	1st term
Trois-Rivières	Robert Ryan	Liberal	1940	1st term
Témiscouata	Jean-François Pouliot	Liberal	1924	6th term
Témiscouata	Jean-François Pouliot	Independent Liberal	1924	6th term
Vaudreuil—Soulanges	Joseph Thauvette	Liberal	1930	3rd term
Verdun	Paul-Émile Côté	Liberal	1940	1st term
Wright	Rodolphe Leduc	Liberal	1936	2nd term

=== Saskatchewan ===
Electoral district	Name	Party	First elected/previously elected	No. of terms
Assiniboia	Jesse Pickard Tripp	Liberal	1940	1st term
Humboldt	Harry Raymond Fleming (died 5 November 1942)	Liberal	1935	2nd term
Humboldt	Joseph William Burton (by-election of 1943-08-09)	C.C.F.	1943	1st term
Kindersley	Charles Henderson	Liberal	1940	1st term
Lake Centre	John Diefenbaker	National Government	1940	1st term
Lake Centre	John Diefenbaker	Progressive Conservative	1940	1st term
Mackenzie	Alexander Malcolm Nicholson	C.C.F.	1940	1st term
Maple Creek	Charles Evans	Liberal	1935	2nd term
Melfort	Percy Wright	C.C.F.	1940	1st term
Melville	**James Garfield Gardiner**	Liberal	1936	2nd term
Moose Jaw	J. Gordon Ross	Liberal	1925, 1935	4th term*
North Battleford	Dorise Nielsen	Unity	1940	1st term
North Battleford	Dorise Nielsen	Labor-Progressive	1940	1st term
Prince Albert	**William Lyon Mackenzie King**	Liberal	1908, (Note: Waterloo North (Ontario)) 1919, (Note: Prince (PEI)/York North (Ontario)) 1926	8th term*
Qu'Appelle	Ernest Perley	National Government	1930 (Note: First elected as a Liberal)	3rd term
Qu'Appelle	Ernest Perley	Progressive Conservative	1930	3rd term
Regina City	Donald McNiven	Liberal	1935	2nd term
Regina City	Donald McNiven upon being named judge on 19 October 1944	Vacant		
Rosetown—Biggar	M. J. Coldwell	C.C.F.	1935	2nd term
Rosthern	Walter Tucker	Liberal	1935	2nd term
Saskatoon City	Walter George Brown (died 1 April 1940)	United Reform	1939	2nd term
Saskatoon City	Alfred Henry Bence (by-election of 1940-08-19)	Conservative	1940	1st term
Saskatoon City	Alfred Henry Bence (by-election of 1940-08-19)	Progressive Conservative	1940	1st term
Swift Current	Roy Theodore Graham	Liberal	1940	1st term
The Battlefords	John Gregory	Liberal	1940	1st term
Weyburn	Tommy Douglas	C.C.F.	1935	2nd term
Weyburn	Tommy Douglas resigned on 31 May 1944 to enter provincial politics	Vacant		
Wood Mountain	Thomas Donnelly	Liberal	1925	5th term
Yorkton	George Hugh Castleden	C.C.F.	1940	1st term

=== Yukon ===
Electoral district	Name	Party	First elected/previously elected	No. of terms
Yukon	George Black	National Government	1921, 1940	5th term*
Yukon	George Black	Progressive Conservative	1921, 1940	5th term*

== By-elections ==
By-election	Date	Incumbent	Party	Winner	Party	Cause	Retained
Grey North	February 5, 1945	William Pattison Telford, Jr.	Liberal	W. Garfield Case	Progressive Conservative	Resignation to provide a seat for Andrew McNaughton	No
Cartier	August 9, 1943	Peter Bercovitch	Liberal	Fred Rose	Labor-Progressive	Death	No
Stanstead	August 9, 1943	Robert Davison	Liberal	Joseph-Armand Choquette	Bloc populaire Canadien	Election declared void	No
Humboldt	August 9, 1943	Harry Raymond Fleming	Liberal	Joseph William Burton	C. C. F.	Death	No
Selkirk	August 9, 1943	Joseph Thorarinn Thorson	Liberal	William Bryce	C. C. F.	Appointed President of the Exchequer Court of Canada	No
Charlevoix—Saguenay	November 30, 1942	Pierre-François Casgrain	Liberal	Frédéric Dorion	Independent	Appointed a Superior Court Judge of Quebec	No
Winnipeg North Centre	November 30, 1942	J. S. Woodsworth	C. C. F.	Stanley Knowles	C. C. F.	Death	Yes
Outremont	November 30, 1942	Thomas Vien	Liberal	Léo Richer Laflèche	Liberal	Called to the Senate	Yes
St. Mary	February 9, 1942	Hermas Deslauriers	Liberal	Gaspard Fauteux	Liberal	Death	Yes
Welland	February 9, 1942	Arthur Damude	Liberal	Humphrey Mitchell	Liberal	Death	Yes
York South	February 9, 1942	Alan Cockeram	National Government	Joseph W. Noseworthy	C. C. F.	Resignation to provide a seat for Arthur Meighen	No
Quebec East	February 9, 1942	Ernest Lapointe	Liberal	Louis St. Laurent	Liberal	Death	Yes
Edmonton East	June 2, 1941	Frederick Clayton Casselman	Liberal	Cora Taylor Casselman	Liberal	Death	Yes
Saskatoon City	August 19, 1940	Walter George Brown	United Reform Movement	Alfred Henry Bence	Conservative	Death	No
Carleton	August 19, 1940	Alonzo Hyndman	National Government	George Russell Boucher	Conservative	Death	Yes
Waterloo North	August 19, 1940	William Daum Euler	Liberal	Louis Orville Breithaupt	Liberal	Called to the Senate	Yes
Kingston City	August 12, 1940	Norman McLeod Rogers	Liberal	Angus Lewis Macdonald	Liberal	Death	Yes
