= Women in the 15th Canadian Parliament =

During the 15th Canadian Parliament, there was no change in representation by women. Four women ran for seats in the Canadian House of Commons in the 1925 federal election but Agnes Macphail, first elected in 1921, continued to be the only woman elected.

== Party Standings ==
Party	Total women candidates	% women candidates of total candidates	Total women elected	% women elected of total women candidates	% women elected of total elected
Labour	1 (of 20)	5.0%	0 (of 2)	0%	0%
Progressive	1 (of 68)	1.5%	1 (of 22)	100%	4.5%
Independent Conservative	1 (of 6)	16.7%	0 (of 1)	0%	0%
Independent	1 (of 8)	12.5%	0 (of 2)	0%	0%
Table source:

== Members of the House of Commons ==
Name	Party	Electoral district	Notes
Agnes Macphail	Progressive	Grey Southeast
