= Women in the 14th Canadian Parliament =

The 14th Canadian Parliament was the first Canadian parliament where a woman sat as a member. Women first became eligible to hold seats in the Canadian House of Commons on July 7, 1919. In the 1921 federal election, four women ran for seats in the House of Commons. Agnes Macphail was elected for a rural constituency in Ontario, becoming the first woman to hold a seat in the Canadian parliament.

== Party Standings ==
Party	Total women candidates	% women candidates of total candidates	Total women elected	% women elected of total women candidates	% women elected of total elected
Liberal	1 (of 204)	0.5%	0 (of 118)	0%	0%
Labour	2 (of 28)	7.1%	0 (of 3)	0%	0%
Progressive	1 (of 137)	0.7%	1 (of 58)	100%	1.7%
Table source:

== Members of the House of Commons ==
Name	Party	Electoral district	Notes
Agnes Macphail	Progressive	Grey Southeast	first woman MP from Ontario
