= Roy Knight =

Roy Knight may refer to:

- Roy Knight (politician) (1891–1971), Canadian politician
- Roy Knight (wrestler) (born 1981), British wrestler
