= Canadian Northern Corridor =

Conceptual transportation corridor in Canada

The Canadian Northern Corridor (CNC) is a concept for a multi-modal (road, rail, pipeline, electrical transmission and communication) transportation corridor through Canada's North and Near-North.

The CNC would be a multi-use corridor infrastructure megaproject spanning Canada's east-west mid-latitude with several northern spurs, approximately 7,000 to 10,000 km long and costing roughly $100 billion–$150 billion. The concept was studied jointly in 2016 by academics at the University of Calgary School of Public Policy and CIRANO.

On June 21, 2017, the Standing Senate Committee on Banking, Trade and Commerce released a report entitled National Corridor Enhancing and Facilitating Commerce and Internal Trade that was a major endorsement of the NC concept. In a press release issued simultaneously, the committee called the NC concept a visionary project that could unlock extraordinary economic potential.

During the 2019 Canadian federal election, Andrew Scheer's Conservative Party platform included establishing a "National Energy Corridor". During the 2025 election, Pierre Poilievre's Conservative Party revived the idea of a "National Energy Corridor", and Mark Carney's governing Liberal Party budgeted $5 billion for a Trade Diversification Corridor Fund.

== Research ==
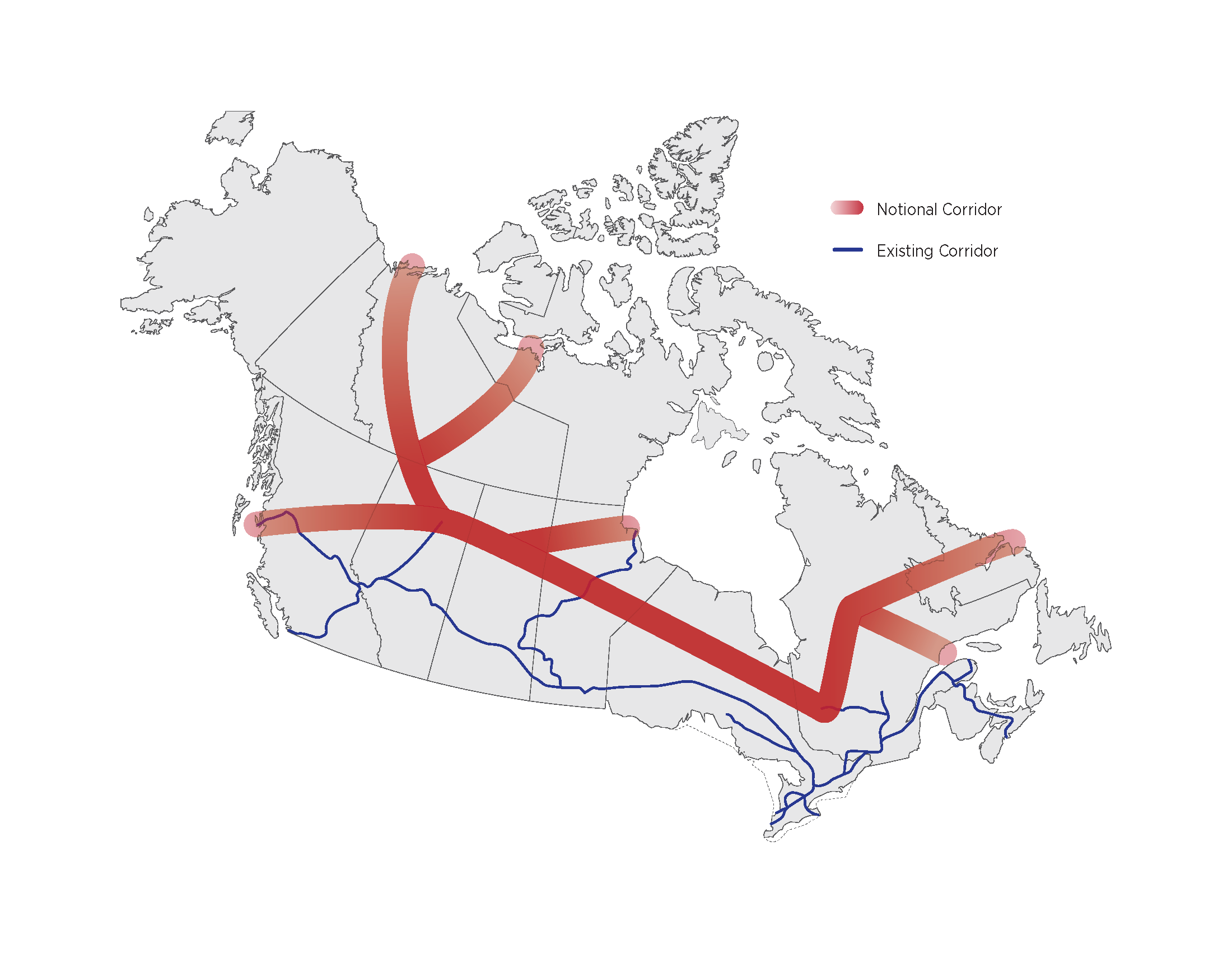
A map of the notional route for the Canadian Northern Corridor

In May 2016, the University of Calgary School of Public policy and CIRANO published a paper examining the potential for a Transportation Corridor (the Canadian Northern Corridor) which would encompass an established right-of-way for transportation infrastructure based on local consultation and the negotiation of appropriate land usage rights. The initial paper also outlined the range of issues that required detailed study to determine the Corridor's viability. Additional scholarly work on the subject, coordinated by the University of Calgary, School of Public Policy, is intended to follow from this initial paper. They planned to present this paper to the government of Canada by 2025.

== Corridor ==
While no specific geographic path for the Canadian Northern Corridor has been formalized, the Corridor concept has been described as follows:

In initial concept, the Northern Corridor would be approximately 7000 km in length. It would largely follow the boreal forest in the northern part of the west, with a spur along the Mackenzie Valley, and then southeast from the Churchill area to northern Ontario and the "Ring of Fire" area; the corridor would then traverse northern Quebec to Labrador, with augmented ports. The right-of-way would have room for roads, rail lines, pipelines and transmission lines, and would interconnect with the existing (southern-focused) transportation network.

In late 2025, the Port of Saguenay, Quebec, promoted upgrading the rail linkage between existing networks in northeast Ontario to the port of Saguenay. Except for a 160 km length, the trackage in Quebec is privately owned and operated. The gap was converted to multi-use recreational trails Lebel-sur-Quévillon and Chapais, Quebec, must be rehabilitated to restore a continuous connection between the Quebec and Ontario rail networks.

== Relation to previous studies ==
The concept is similar in scope, yet distinct from, the "Mid-Canada Corridor" proposed and studied by the Mid-Canada Development Foundation as chaired by Richard Rohmer.

== Trademark ==
The Canadian Northern Corridor trademark application at the Canadian Intellectual Property Office was filed on April 29, 2019. On September 11, 2019, the Registrar of Trademarks gave public notice under subparagraph 9(1)(n)(ii) of the Trademarks Act of this prohibited mark.
