= Gordon Drummond (disambiguation) =

Gordon Drummond was a Canadian-born officer.

Gordon Drummond may also refer to:

- Gordon Drummond (cricketer) (born 1980), Scottish cricketer

== See also ==
- Gordon Drummond Clancy (1912–1985), member of the Canadian House of Commons
