= George Hugh Castleden =

Canadian politician

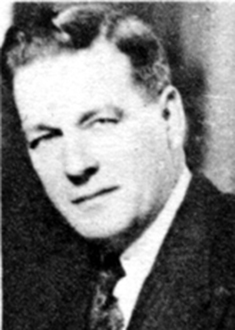

Member of Parliament for Yorkton
- In office March 1940 – June 1949
- Preceded by: George Washington McPhee
- Succeeded by: Alan Carl Stewart
- In office August 1953 – March 1958
- Preceded by: Alan Carl Stewart
- Succeeded by: Gordon Drummond Clancy

Personal details
- Born: George Hugh Castleden; 23 July 1895 Moosomin, Northwest Territories
- Died: 25 April 1969 (aged 73)
- Party: Co-operative Commonwealth Federation
- Profession: teacher

George Hugh Castleden (23 July 1895 – 25 April 1969) was a Co-operative Commonwealth Federation member of the House of Commons of Canada. He was born in Moosomin, Northwest Territories and became a teacher by career.

He was first elected at the Yorkton riding in the 1940 general election then re-elected in 1945. In the 1949 election he was defeated by Alan Carl Stewart of the Liberal Party.

Stewart did not seek another term in Yorkton, allowing Castleden to unseat the new Liberal candidate Patrick Sheehan O'Dwyer in the 1953 election. Castleden won a consecutive re-election in 1957, but was defeated by Gordon Drummond Clancy of the Progressive Conservative Party in the 1958 election.
