= George Landerkin =

Canadian politician (1839–1903)

The Honourable George Landerkin
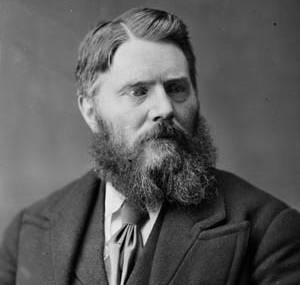

Member of Parliament for Grey South
- In office 1872–1878
- Preceded by: George Jackson
- Succeeded by: George Jackson
- In office 1882–1900
- Preceded by: George Jackson
- Succeeded by: Matthew Kendal Richardson

Canadian Senator from Ontario
- In office 1901–1903
- Appointed by: Wilfrid Laurier

Personal details
- Born: July 20, 1839 Simcoe County, Upper Canada
- Died: October 4, 1903 (aged 64) Hanover, Ontario, Canada
- Party: Liberal

George Landerkin (July 20, 1839 – October 4, 1903) was a Canadian physician and political figure. He represented Grey South in the House of Commons of Canada as a Liberal member from 1872 to 1878 and from 1882 to 1900. From 1901 to 1903, he was a member of the Senate of Canada.

== Background ==
He was born in West Gwillimbury, Simcoe County, Upper Canada, the son of James Landerkin, who came there from Nova Scotia. He was educated at Victoria College in Cobourg, where he received his M.D. Landerkin worked on a farm for several years before obtaining his medical degree. He practised medicine in Hanover, Ontario. Landerkin was also president of Canada Mutual Mining and Development Company. In 1870, he married Mary Matilda Kirkendall. Landerkin was defeated by George Jackson for the federal seat in 1878. He died in Hanover at the age of 64.

== Electoral record ==
1872 Canadian federal election: Grey South
Party	Candidate	Votes
Liberal	George Landerkin	1,150
Conservative	George Jackson	977
Source: Canadian Elections Database

1874 Canadian federal election: Grey South
Party	Candidate	Votes
Liberal	George Landerkin	1,248
Unknown	? Prebble	863

1878 Canadian federal election: Grey South
Party	Candidate	Votes
Liberal–Conservative	George Jackson	1,163
Liberal	George Landerkin	1,082

1882 Canadian federal election: Grey South
Party	Candidate	Votes
Liberal	George Landerkin	1,765
Liberal–Conservative	Geo. Jackson	1,689

1887 Canadian federal election: Grey South
Party	Candidate	Votes
Liberal	George Landerkin	2,292
Conservative	David Jamieson	2,195

1891 Canadian federal election: Grey South
Party	Candidate	Votes
Liberal	George Landerkin	2,284
Conservative	John Blyth	2,281

1896 Canadian federal election: Grey South
Party	Candidate	Votes
Liberal	George Landerkin	1,819
Conservative	David Jameson	1,753
Patrons of Industry	William Allan	1,196

1900 Canadian federal election: Grey South
Party	Candidate	Votes
Liberal–Conservative	Matthew Richardson	2,375
Liberal	George Landerkin	2,231
