= Henry Horton Miller =

Canadian politician

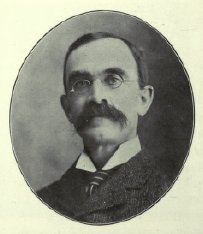

Member of the Canadian Parliament for Grey South
- In office 1904–1911
- Preceded by: Matthew Kendal Richardson
- Succeeded by: Robert James Ball

Personal details
- Born: January 10, 1861 Owen Sound, Canada West
- Died: September 4, 1916 (aged 55)
- Party: Liberal

Henry Horton Miller (January 10, 1861 – September 4, 1916) was a Canadian politician.

== Life ==
Born in Owen Sound, Canada West, Miller was educated at the public and high schools of Owen Sound. A real estate agent by occupation, Miller was elected to the House of Commons of Canada for the Ontario electoral district of Grey South in the 1904 federal election. A Liberal, he was re-elected in the 1908 election but was defeated in the 1911 election.

1904 Canadian federal election: Grey South
Party	Candidate	Votes
Liberal	Henry Horton Miller	2,227
Conservative	Charles McKinnon	1,911

1908 Canadian federal election: Grey South
Party	Candidate	Votes
Liberal	Henry Horton Miller	2,267
Conservative	Robert James Ball	2,180

1911 Canadian federal election: Grey South
Party	Candidate	Votes
Conservative	Robert James Ball	2,139
Liberal	Henry Horton Miller	2,091
