= Carl Niderost =

Canadian politician (1898–1973)

Carl Niderost (June 19, 1898 – 1973) was an English-born lawyer and political figure in Saskatchewan, Canada. He served as mayor of Saskatoon from 1939 to 1940.

He was born in Birmingham, the son of Carl Niderost, a native of Switzerland, and Caroline Schaaf, a native of Germany, and came to Canada with his family in 1908. Niderost was educated in Birmingham, in Saskatoon and at the University of Saskatchewan. He was admitted to the Saskatchewan bar in 1921. He served as a member of the city council for Saskatoon from 1935 to 1938. Niderost ran unsuccessfully for the Saskatoon City federal seat in 1940.
