= John A. Leslie (Canadian politician) =

Canadian politician from Ontario

Member of the Ontario Provincial Parliament for York East
- In office June 4, 1945 – April 27, 1948
- Preceded by: Agnes Macphail
- Succeeded by: Agnes Macphail

Personal details
- Party: Progressive Conservative

John A. Leslie was a Canadian politician who was Progressive Conservative MPP for York East from 1945 to 1948.

The John A Leslie Public School in Scarborough, Ontario is named after him.

== See also ==
- 22nd Parliament of Ontario
