= Louis-Edmond Hamelin =

Canadian geographer, professor, and author (1923–2020)

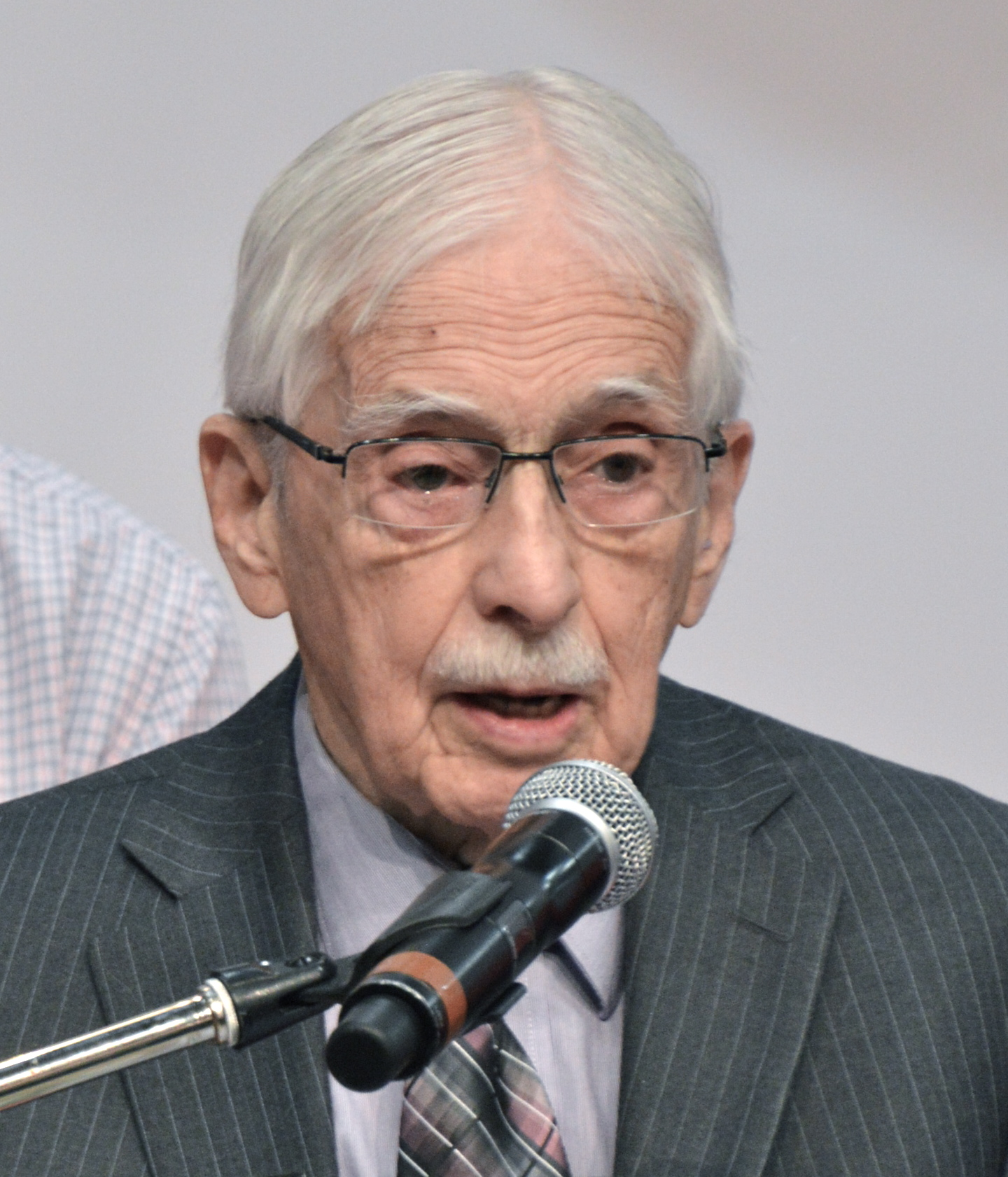
- Hamelin in 2014
- Born: Louis-Edmond Hamelin; March 21, 1923; Saint-Didace, Quebec
- Died: February 10, 2020 (aged 96)
- Occupation: Geographer

Louis-Edmond Hamelin, OC GOQ FRSC (March 21, 1923 – February 11, 2020) was a Canadian geographer, professor, and author born in Saint-Didace, Quebec, Canada, best known for his studies of Northern Canada.

Hamelin created the Centre for Northern Studies at the Université Laval in Québec and was rector of the Université du Québec à Trois-Rivières from 1978 to 1983. He was also a member of the Northwest Territories Legislative Council.

Hamelin specialized in Northern and Aboriginal peoples studies. He coined several words concerning the North, some of which (such as Nordicity) came to enter the English vocabulary. His seminal work was the 1958 Nordicité Canadienne (translated 1979 as Canadian Nordicity: It's Your North, Too). He was an influence on proposals initiated in the 1960s for a massive development in Northern Canada called the Mid-Canada Corridor.

== Honours ==
- 1962 – Fellow of the Royal Society of Canada
- 1972 – Léo-Pariseau Prize
- 1972 – Pierre Chauveau Medal
- 1974 – Officer of the Order of Canada
- 1975 – Governor General's Award
- 1976 – Royal Canadian Geographical Society's Massey Medal
- 1982 – Gloire de l'Escolle Medal
- 1982 – Molson Prize
- 1987 – Léon-Gérin Prize
- 1989 – Correspondent of Académie des Sciences Morales et Politiques (France)
- 1994 – Ordre des francophones d'Amérique
- 1998 – Grand officer of the National Order of Quebec
- 2014 – Hubert Reeves Award
