= Alan Carl Stewart =

Canadian politician

Alan Carl Stewart (September 27, 1893 – July 26, 1958) was a Canadian provincial and federal politician.

Born in Moosomin, Saskatchewan, the son of Robert Whiteside Stewart and Savilla Mary Maud, he was educated in Moosomin and at the University of Manitoba. Stewart was first elected to the Saskatchewan Legislative Assembly of Saskatchewan in 1929. He won as an independent for the constituency of Yorkton, but was given a position as Minister of Highways within the coalition government led by Tory premier James Thomas Milton Anderson. He served as Minister of Highways until the fall of the government in 1934. In the 1934 election he ran as a Conservative, but lost to the Liberal candidate, Vincent Reynolds Smith. He was re-elected in 1938 under the Unity party, serving until 1944.

Stewart was elected as a Liberal to the House of Commons representing the federal riding of Yorkton, serving as a member of the Liberal government led by Louis St. Laurent from 1949 to 1953. He retired from politics due to ill health.

Stewart served in the Canadian Expeditionary Force during World War I; he was severely injured at Passchendaele. A lawyer by profession, he served as solicitor for the city of Yorkton. He was also president of the Yorkton Board of Trade and Yorkton's first mayor. In 1922, he married Gladys Mae McDougall.

He died in Long Beach, California at the age of 64.

Parliament of Canada
Preceded by George Hugh Castleden	Member of Parliament for Yorkton; 1949–1953	Succeeded by George Hugh Castleden
