= George Byron Smith =

Canadian politician

Member of Provincial Parliament
- In office 1886–1894
- Preceded by: George Badgerow
- Succeeded by: John Richardson
- Constituency: York East

Personal details
- Born: March 7, 1839 Newtonville, Upper Canada
- Died: December 13, 1917 (aged 78) Los Angeles, California
- Party: Liberal
- Spouse: Maria Allan (1837-1917) m. 1861
- Children: 2
- Occupation: Businessman

George Byron Smith (March 7, 1839 – December 13, 1917) was an Ontario merchant and political figure. He represented York East in the Legislative Assembly of Ontario as a Liberal member from 1886 to 1894.

He was born in Newtonville, Upper Canada in 1839, the son of N.C. Smith, and was employed as a clerk in his father's business at the age of thirteen. In 1861, he opened his own store at St. Mary's. In the same year, he married Maria Allan. Smith served on the town council there. In 1875, he opened a wholesale dry goods outlet in Toronto, in partnership with a former employee, Duncan Henderson, and moved to Toronto. The store in St. Mary's was managed by another former employee, now a partner, Jeremiah White. Smith also served as an alderman for the city of Toronto. He died on a trip to Los Angeles in 1917. He was buried at Mount Pleasant Cemetery, Toronto beside his wife.
