= Mid-Canada Corridor =

1960s development proposal by Richard Rohmer

The Mid-Canada Corridor is a strategic plan created by Canadian veteran and land-use planner Richard Rohmer, proposing massive development of Canadian land away from where most of the Canadian population is currently distributed. Intent for the plan was to develop Canada's access for extractive mineral industries distributed in currently inaccessible regions. The plan called for substantial government investment in transportation infrastructure, including a $0.7 billion–$1.2 billion (1960s $CAD) investment in 3,000–4,100 new miles (4,800–6,600 km) of railway. Original proposals highlighted future population centres of growth in Fort Smith, Flin Flon, Thunder Bay, Timmins and Labrador City. The plan was also developed in part to help facilitate population growth and immigration, with Rohmer suggesting Canada may see population growth of 100 million Canadians by 2070. Despite substantial initial interest from both public and private sectors, the plan was never implemented.

== History ==
The conceptualization of the "middle north" as a concept was largely originated by Laval academic Louis-Edmond Hamelin, who among contemporaries developed the concept of "nordicity", which measures an extent of cultural northernness and capacity to support human settlement. While this academic focus had a role in the precipitation of the plan, the focus on development of the middle north as a topic is largely attributed to the private efforts of Mr. Rohmer by academic B.G. Vanderhill in assessing the topic of Mid-Canadian development generally.

The plan was proposed by Richard Rohmer in approximately 1968. The plan was publicized through a series of conferences held by Rohmer's organizations, the Mid-Canada Development Corridor Foundation and Acres Limited. An initial conference was hosted at Lakehead University, with the Governor General and former Prime Minister Lester Pearson as supporters, with industry representation from Canadian Pacific and Canadian National railways, Air Canada and Bank of Montreal among others. A final report by 1971 was not well-received by new Prime Minister Pierre Trudeau and implementation was not pursued.

== Legacy ==
While an initial report by Acres Limited suggested Canada may be receptive to planned communities in colder northern climates without arable soil, but as historian Ken Coates notes, the hope that large populations of Canadians may acclimatize to colder climates is a persistent obstacle to developing new northern population centres.

Canadian planner John van Norstrand notes that many of the proposed developments for resource extraction have developed of their own accord, albeit without large population centres developing in the way that Rohmer suggested.

The focus on northern development has not abandoned the idea of active government planning and investment however, with some academics and NGO analysts currently focusing on redeveloping a plan called the Canadian Northern Corridor, including new focus on integration with Indigenous rights, communities and wishes, as well as environmental concerns, which were all somewhat limited in original proposals.

The legacy is reflected in a 2017 report by the Standing Senate Committee on Banking, Trade and Commerce in the Canadian Senate, where current corridor plans still follow the Rohmer model. The report notes the success of the Australian Pilbara corridor as a success, with a highly similar approach to Rohmer and his associates.

== Proposed Developments ==
Developments were most comprehensively outlined within a document from Acres Limited, associated with Rohmer. The report outlined an evidence-based vision of development based on the then-availability of transportation infrastructure, climactic regions, soil quality and muskeg prevalence, mineral and water availability, hydroelectric potential and existing settlements, among others.

The project called for three new potential new road and rail corridors. The first and largest was in a more-or-less straight line from Thunder Bay to Whitehorse, with overlap in the area of Flin Flon, Fort McMurray and Fort Nelson. A second corridor would more-or-less follow the MacKenzie River from Hay River to Inuvik. A third would connect transportation infrastructure in Newfoundland across the Strait of Belle Isle, either sharing Trans-Labrador Highway some of the distance toward Labrador City before diverging to create a new connection, before turning southwest to meet existing infrastructure around Chibougamau. These proposals totaled approximately 6600 kilometers of development in either road and rail, or both. Estimates of cost of the most expansive transportation infrastructure scenario at that time were approximately $2.75 billion dollars, or approximately $22 billion in 2021 dollars. The report preferenced creation of a railway ahead of a transcontinental highway, given the affordances rail gives to industry. The report also seems to indicate that integration of the corridor with the Hudson Bay Railway and expansion of docklands at Churchill. The report predicted that air travel would form a component of the corridor, especially the use of short-takeoff small aircraft and helicopters, and was generally bullish on VTOL capabilities in aircraft, cargo submarines to bypass icepack, hovercraft development and in helicopter cargo capacity. The report mentions pipeline technology, but does not make specific calls for creation of pipelines. The report is silent on electric grid integration or hydro corridors.

The plan envisioned many smaller towns, but imagined large population centres in Fort Smith, Flin Flon, Thunder Bay, Timmins and Labrador City, as well as Whitehorse and the Noranda District/Val-d'Or. The report suggests that natural development will spring up around development of the infrastructure, but did call for some government role in designating sites. The report envisioned population increases of 500,000 in connection with the new population centres combined. The report indicated three models for construction, one including traditional government funded projects, a second of subsidies for private construction, and a third establishing a Crown Corporation to issue bonds and then construct government-owned but privately leveraged projects. The plan called for at subsidized incomes—at least initially, subsidized amenities, and making amenities readily available. This resident quality-of-life and financial incentivization was to be paired with industry incentives for creation. Envisioned cities in the corridor would be of high-density, modelled off of Swedish developments in Svappavaara and Kiruna, to maximize proximity to amenities, allow for centralized life-support, and maximize exposure to sun.
