= Richard Rohmer =

Canadian aviator, lawyer and author (born 1924)

Lieutenant-General Richard Rohmer OC CMM OOnt DFC CD KC
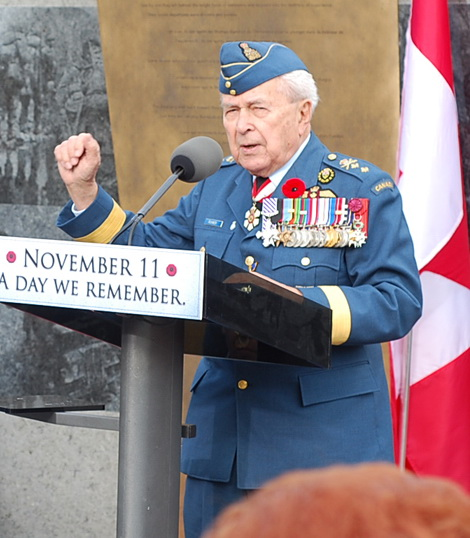
- Rohmer at a Remembrance Day ceremony in 2009
- Born: Richard Heath Rohmer; January 24, 1924 (age 102); Hamilton, Ontario, Canada
- Spouse: Mary Whiteside (m. 1949; died 2020)
- Children: 2, including Ann
- Military career
- Allegiance: Canada
- Branch: Royal Canadian Air Force
- Service years: 1942–1948 1950-1953 1975-1981
- Rank: Major-General (Ret'd); Lieutenant-General (honorary)
- Commands: Chief of Reserves of the Canadian Armed Forces; Commander of the Air Reserve Group
- Conflicts: World War II
- Awards: Order of Canada; Order of Military Merit; Order of Saint John; Order of Ontario; Distinguished Flying Cross; Canadian Forces' Decoration; Order of Leopold (Belgium); Legion of Honour (France)
- Other work: Author, lawyer, columnist

Richard Heath Rohmer OC CMM OOnt DFC CD KC (born January 24, 1924) is a Canadian aviator, lawyer, adviser, author and historian. During the Second World War, he served in the Royal Canadian Air Force as a fighter-reconnaissance pilot, took part in D-Day and the Battle of Normandy, and was awarded the Distinguished Flying Cross. He later served as Chief of Reserves of the Canadian Armed Forces from 1978 to 1981 and was granted the honorary rank of lieutenant-general in 2015.

Rohmer was born in Hamilton, Ontario, and spent some of his early youth in Pasadena, California, as well as in western Ontario at Windsor and Fort Erie. He is also known as the author of political and military thrillers, including Ultimatum and Separation; The Canadian Encyclopedia described Ultimatum as the best-selling novel in Canada in 1973.

== Military career ==
After high school, Rohmer worked briefly at Fleet Aerospace. He then left Fleet on his 18th birthday to join the Royal Canadian Air Force (RCAF). In Europe in 1943–44, he flew North American Mustang fighters with 430 Squadron as a fighter-reconnaissance pilot. He took part in D-Day and the Battle of Normandy, served in France, Belgium and Holland, and completed a 135-mission tour of operations in November 1944.

The Juno Beach Centre credits Rohmer with spotting the staff car carrying Field Marshal Erwin Rommel on July 17, 1944. Rohmer reported the car's location by radio to the Group Control Centre, which sent in two Spitfires to carry out the attack.

In 1945, he was demobilized and transferred to the Royal Canadian Naval Reserve (RCN(R)), where he was appointed as a lieutenant (P) RCN(R) with seniority. He served at HMCS Hunter in Windsor, Ontario, as commanding officer University Naval Training Division (UNTD) from 1946 until he retired in 1948.

In 1950, he returned to the RCAF (Reserve), flying Vampire jets and commanding 400 Squadron (City of Toronto) and 411 Squadron (County of York). He retired in 1953 as a wing commander.

In 1971, he was appointed honorary Lieutenant-Colonel (and later Honorary Colonel) of 411 Air Reserve Squadron. In April 1975, he was promoted to brigadier-general and appointed Senior Air Reserve Advisor. On April 1, 1976, he was appointed commander of the newly formed Air Reserve Group. On January 31, 1978, he was promoted to the rank of major-general and appointed Chief of Reserves; he retired in 1981. He was appointed a commander of the Order of Military Merit in December 1978.

On December 22, 2014, Major-General (Retired) Rohmer was named honorary advisor to the Canadian Armed Forces Chief of the Defence Staff, a three-year appointment created to recognize his contributions to the Canadian Armed Forces and his advice to the Chief of the Defence Staff.

On June 26, 2015, in his capacity as honorary advisor to the Chief of the Defence Staff, Rohmer was granted the honorary rank of Lieutenant-General.

== Political career ==
From 1957 to 1959, Rohmer was a councillor on North York township council representing Ward 1, the township's easternmost district, which included Don Mills where his family had lived since 1954.

In 1958, he unsuccessfully challenged Hollis Beckett, the incumbent Progressive Conservative MPP in the riding of York East, for the Conservative nomination for the 1959 Ontario general election.

In the 1960s, he supported John Robarts's successful candidacy to lead the Ontario Progressive Conservative Party and then served as a senior advisor and legal counsel to Premier Robarts for three years. He and Robarts conceived the idea, adopted by the provincial legislature in 1965, that the province adopt a provincial flag modelled on the Red Ensign. The move was in response to the Great Canadian flag debate in which the federal government decided to drop the Canadian Red Ensign in favour of the Maple Leaf flag.

Rohmer is a monarchist.

== Mid-Canada Corridor ==
In the late 1960s and early 1970s, Rohmer promoted a plan for a megaproject to develop and populate the Canadian sub-Arctic which he called the "Mid-Canada Corridor". While the plan interested some industrialists, CEOs, bankers, and the railways, it failed to win support from the Canadian government.

== Legal career ==
Rohmer completed his legal studies at Osgoode Hall Law School, was called to the Ontario bar in 1951, and was appointed Queen's Counsel in 1960. His legal practice was principally in transportation, land-use and municipal law. He later became a name partner at the Toronto-area law firm Rohmer & Fenn LLP and retired from practice.

== Literary activities ==
Rohmer is a Canadian author of fiction and non-fiction. The Encyclopedia of Science Fiction describes his fiction as frequently returning to anxieties about Canada's political and economic vulnerability and to scenarios involving conflict with the United States. Two of his better-known novels are Ultimatum and Separation. Ultimatum, published in 1973, features political, economic, and energy crisis themes; it was the best-selling novel in Canada in 1973. The novel describes an unnamed American president demanding access to Canada's Arctic natural gas before threatening military action against Canada.

Three years later, Rohmer published Separation, a novel with domestic and international political themes surrounding the ambition of Quebec separatists to establish the Canadian province as a separate nation. It stayed on the Toronto Star's best-seller list for 22 weeks. Separation was made into a television movie in 1977, and aired on the CTV network. Barry Morse was cast for a brief appearance as the British prime minister.

Throughout his literary career he has published more than two dozen books of fiction and non-fiction. His later works include Ultimatum 2, published in 2007, and the historical novel Sir John A's Crusade and Seward's Magnificent Folly.

Rohmer chaired the Ontario Royal Commission on Book Publishing in 1971–72.

== Volunteer work ==
He was twice chancellor of the University of Windsor, serving from 1978 to 1989 and again from 1996 to 1997. In 1978, he negotiated the donation of Conrad Black's collection of Duplessis papers in exchange for an honorary degree.

He was a charter member of his local (Don Mills) Civitan club, and he served as treasurer of the international organization. His position allowed him to meet U.S. President Dwight D. Eisenhower to present Civitan's World Citizenship Award.

He was chairman of the 60th anniversary of D-Day celebrations that took place in the presence of the Queen of Canada at Juno Beach in Normandy on June 6, 2004. As ministerial advisor to the Minister of Veterans Affairs, he took part in planning Canada's 70th anniversary D-Day commemoration in Normandy in 2014 and the 70th anniversary commemoration of the liberation of the Netherlands in 2015.

He co-chaired the Ontario advisory committee that created the veterans' memorial unveiled on September 17, 2006, in front of the provincial legislature at Queen's Park, chaired the Premier's Ceremonial Advisory Committee, and served for ten years on the Advisory Council of the Order of Ontario.

Rohmer has held several honorary public-service positions, including honorary commissioner of the Ontario Provincial Police, honorary chief of Toronto Paramedic Services, patron of St. John Ambulance Toronto, honorary fire chief of Collingwood, Ontario, and honorary chief of the Toronto Police Service. The Ontario Association of Paramedic Chiefs described him as its first honorary chief.

== Personal life ==
His wife of 70 years, Mary Olivia (nicknamed Mary-O), died in January 2020. He has two daughters: Ann, a TV personality, and Catherine, a lawyer. He is a licensed pilot.

Rohmer turned 100 on January 24, 2024, and resides in the veterans' wing of Sunnybrook Health Sciences Centre in Toronto.

== Bibliography ==
=== Novels ===
- Ultimatum (1973) Toronto, Clarke, Irwin ISBN 9780772006189
- Exxoneration (1974)
- Exodus UK (1975) Toronto : McClelland and Stewart ISBN 9780771077067
- Separation (1976) McClelland and Stewart ISBN 9780771077043
- Balls! (1980)
- Periscope Red (1980)
- Separation two (1981)
- Triad (1982)
- Retaliation (1982)
- Starmageddon (1986)
- Hour of the Fox (1988)
- Red Arctic (1989)
- John A.'s Crusade (1995)
- Death by Deficit (1996)
- Caged Eagle (2002)
- Ultimatum 2 (2007) Toronto, Dundurn ISBN 978-1-55002-584-2
- Sir John A.'s Crusade and Seward’s Magnificent Folly (2013, updated and expanded)

=== Non-fiction ===
- Practice and Procedure Before the Highway Transport Board (1965)
- The Green North: Mid-Canada (1970)
- The Royal Commission on Book Publishing (chair, 1972)
- The Arctic Imperative (1973) Toronto, McClelland and Stewart ISBN 9780771077012
- Poems by Arthur Henry Ward (1980)
- Patton's Gap (1981) New York : Beaufort Books ISBN 9780082500629
- Massacre 747 (1984)
- Rommel and Patton (1986)
- Raleigh on the Rocks (2002)
- Generally Speaking (autobiography, 2004) Toronto, Dundurn Group ISBN 9781550025187
- Building of the CN Tower (2011)
- Building of the Sky Dome/Rogers Centre (2012)
- Canada's Arctic: Moscow's Next Ukraine (2023)

== Honours ==

Ribbon	Description	Notes
	Order of Canada (OC)	Officer; April 20, 1990
	Order of Military Merit (CMM)	Commander; December 11, 1978
	Distinguished Flying Cross (DFC)	Awarded in 1944
	Order of Saint John	Knight of Justice
	Order of Ontario (O.Ont)	Member; 1997
	1939–1945 Star	
	Air Crew Europe Star	With "France and Germany" clasp
	Defence Medal	
	Canadian Volunteer Service Medal	With overseas clasp
	War Medal	
	Canadian Centennial Medal	1967
	Queen Elizabeth II Silver Jubilee Medal	1977; Canadian version of this medal
	125th Anniversary of the Confederation of Canada Medal	1992
	Queen Elizabeth II Golden Jubilee Medal	2002; Canadian version of this medal
	Queen Elizabeth II Diamond Jubilee Medal	2012; Canadian version of this medal
	King Charles III Coronation Medal	Awarded June 20, 2025; Canadian version of this medal
	Canadian Forces' Decoration (CD)	With 1 bar for 22 years of service
	Service Medal of the Order of St John	With 3 silver clasps
	Order of Leopold	Degree of Officer; From the Kingdom of Belgium
	Legion of Honour	Knight; From the Republic of France

- Appointed as a Queen's Counsel (QC) in 1960.
- Honorary chief of Toronto Police Service (TPS) on March 26, 2015
- Named as "The Most Interesting Canadian" by the National Post

== Honorary degrees ==
Richard Rohmer has received many honorary degrees in recognition of his service to Canada, these include:

Country	Date	School	Degree
Ontario	May 1975	University of Windsor	Doctor of Laws (LL.D)
Ontario	2009	Law Society of Upper Canada	Doctor of Laws (LL.D)
Ontario	November 20, 2015	Royal Military College of Canada	Doctor of Military Science
