= Saskatoon City (federal electoral district) =

Former federal electoral district in Saskatchewan, Canada

Saskatchewan electoral district

Defunct federal electoral district
- Legislature: House of Commons
- District created: 1935
- District abolished: 1947
- First contested: 1935
- Last contested: 1945

Saskatoon City was a federal electoral district in Saskatchewan, Canada, that was represented in the House of Commons of Canada from 1935 to 1949.

== History ==
This riding was created in 1933 from Saskatoon riding. The Saskatoon City riding was abolished in 1947 when it was redistributed into Rosthern, Rosetown—Biggar and Saskatoon ridings.

== Members of Parliament ==
This riding has elected the following members of the House of Commons of Canada:

Saskatoon City
Parliament	Years	Member	Party
Riding created from Saskatoon
18th	1935–1939	Alexander MacGillivray Young	Liberal
18th	1939–1940	Walter George Brown	United Reform Movement
19th	1940–1940	Walter George Brown	United Reform Movement
19th	1940–1945	Alfred Henry Bence	Conservative
20th	1945–1949	Roy Knight	Co-operative Commonwealth
Riding dissolved into Rosthern, Rosetown—Biggar and Saskatoon

== Election results ==
1935 Canadian federal election
Party	Candidate	Votes	%
Liberal	Alexander MacGillivray Young	7,690	39.98
Conservative	James Thomas Milton Anderson	5,859	30.46
Social Credit	Harry Watson Arnold	3,377	17.56
Co-operative Commonwealth	John Evans	1,889	9.82
Reconstruction	Weller Phillip Wensley	419	2.18
Total valid votes		19,234	100.0
Source(s) "Saskatoon City, Saskatchewan (1935-08-14 - 1949-04-29)". History of Federal Ridings Since 1867. Library of Parliament.

Canadian federal by-election, December 18, 1939 Death of Alexander MacGillivray Young
Party	Candidate	Votes	%
United Reform Movement	Walter George Brown	10,756	65.10
Unknown	Michael Patrick Hayes	5,766	34.90
Total valid votes		16,522	100.00
Source(s) "Saskatoon City, Saskatchewan (1935-08-14 - 1949-04-29)". History of Federal Ridings Since 1867. Library of Parliament.

1940 Canadian federal election
Party	Candidate	Votes	%
United Reform Movement	Walter George Brown	13,868	61.76
Liberal	Carl Niderost	8,346	37.17
Social Credit-National Unity	Harry Watson Arnold	241	1.07
Total valid votes		22,455	100.00
Source(s) "Saskatoon City, Saskatchewan (1935-08-14 - 1949-04-29)". History of Federal Ridings Since 1867. Library of Parliament.

Canadian federal by-election, August 19, 1940 Death of Walter George Brown
Party	Candidate	Votes	%
Conservative	Alfred Henry Bence	4,798	31.53
United Reform Movement	Agnes MacPhail	4,057	26.66
Liberal	Michael Patrick Hayes	2,421	15.91
Independent Liberal	Sidney Walter Johns	2,250	14.79
Independent Social Credit	George Howard Bradbrooke	1,200	7.89
Independent	Agnes Wilna Moore	491	3.23
Total valid votes		15,217	100.00
Source(s) "Saskatoon City, Saskatchewan (1935-08-14 - 1949-04-29)". History of Federal Ridings Since 1867. Library of Parliament.

1945 Canadian federal election
Party	Candidate	Votes	%
Co-operative Commonwealth	Roy Knight	9,217	37.94
Progressive Conservative	Alfred Henry Bence	8,339	36.14
Liberal	William Ernest Brunskill	4,902	21.24
Labor–Progressive	Susanna Josephine Gehl	618	2.68
Total valid votes		19,234	100.00
Source(s) "Saskatoon City, Saskatchewan (1935-08-14 - 1949-04-29)". History of Federal Ridings Since 1867. Library of Parliament.

== See also ==
- List of Canadian electoral districts
- Historical federal electoral districts of Canada
