= Hugh Powell Crosby =

Canadian politician

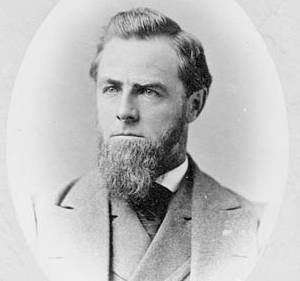

Member of Provincial Parliament
- In office 1867–1874
- Preceded by: Riding established
- Succeeded by: John Lane
- Constituency: York East

Personal details
- Born: January 29, 1829 Markham, Upper Canada
- Died: January 8, 1905 (aged 75) Toronto, Ontario
- Party: Liberal
- Spouse: Harriet Newell White (married 1854).

Hugh Powell Crosby (January 29, 1829 – January 8, 1905) was an Ontario political figure. He represented York East in the Legislative Assembly of Ontario as a Liberal member from 1867 to 1874.

He was born in Markham in Upper Canada in 1829 to Chauncey Crosby and Polly Detweiler (Miller) Crosby and educated there. He served as clerk and treasurer of Markham Township for 10 years. He was also captain in the local militia. He married Harriet Newell White (1834 - 1908), on August 9, 1854. They had a daughter Mary Gertrude Crosby (1869–1941) who married John Crosby Jenkins, and at his death, 5 other siblings.

He died at Toronto General Hospital (Gerrard Street East) following a stroke, and eventually interred at St. James Cemetery (Toronto).

== Electoral history ==
1867 Ontario general election: York East
Party	Candidate	Votes	%
Liberal	Hugh Powell Crosby	1,193	58.25
Conservative	J. Boman	855	41.75
Total valid votes		2,048	72.37
Eligible voters		2,830	
Liberal pickup new district.			
Source: Elections Ontario

1871 Ontario general election: York East
Party	Candidate	Votes	%	±%
Liberal	Hugh Powell Crosby	791	70.19	+11.93
Conservative	Mr. Hosteller	336	29.81	−11.93
Turnout		1,127	36.52	−35.85
Eligible voters		3,086		
Liberal hold		Swing		+11.93
Source: Elections Ontario
