= Yorkton (federal electoral district) =

Former federal electoral district in Saskatchewan, Canada

Yorkton was a federal electoral district in Saskatchewan, Canada, that was represented in the House of Commons of Canada from 1925 to 1968. This riding was created in 1924 from parts of Mackenzie and Saltcoats ridings.

It was abolished in 1966 when it was redistributed into Regina East, Regina—Lake Centre and Yorkton—Melville ridings.

== History ==
=== Historical boundaries ===
1924 representation order

1933 representation order

1947 representation order

1952 representation order

=== Members of Parliament ===
This riding elected the following members of Parliament:

Parliament	Years	Member	Party
Yorkton; Riding established from Mackenzie and Saltcoats
15th	1925–1926	George Washington McPhee	Liberal
16th	1926–1930	George Washington McPhee	Liberal
17th	1930–1935	George Washington McPhee	Liberal
18th	1935–1940	George Washington McPhee	Liberal
19th	1940–1945	George Hugh Castleden	Co-operative Commonwealth
20th	1945–1949	George Hugh Castleden	Co-operative Commonwealth
21st	1949–1953	Alan Carl Stewart	Liberal
22nd	1953–1957	George Hugh Castleden	Co-operative Commonwealth
23rd	1957–1958	George Hugh Castleden	Co-operative Commonwealth
24th	1958–1962	Gordon Drummond Clancy	Progressive Conservative
25th	1962–1963	Gordon Drummond Clancy	Progressive Conservative
26th	1963–1965	Gordon Drummond Clancy	Progressive Conservative
27th	1965–1968	Gordon Drummond Clancy	Progressive Conservative
Riding dissolved into Regina East, Regina—Lake Centre and Yorkton—Melville

== Election results ==
1925 Canadian federal election
Party	Candidate	Votes
Liberal	George Washington McPhee	3,702
Progressive	Alan Carl Stewart	2,579
Conservative	Frederick George Garvin	1,212

1926 Canadian federal election
Party	Candidate	Votes
Liberal	George Washington McPhee	4,421
Progressive	Roy David Loucks	3,121

1930 Canadian federal election
Party	Candidate	Votes
Liberal	George Washington McPhee	6,887
Independent	Robert Barbour	5,406

1935 Canadian federal election
Party	Candidate	Votes
Liberal	George Washington McPhee	7,491
Co-operative Commonwealth	Jacob Benson	4,129
Conservative	John Hnatyshyn	4,123
Reconstruction	William Kelso	2,088

1940 Canadian federal election
Party	Candidate	Votes
Co-operative Commonwealth	George Hugh Castleden	7,658
Liberal	Allan Grant McLean	6,773
National Government	John Hnatyshyn	4,690
Communist	Thomas Gerald McManus	1,047

1945 Canadian federal election
Party	Candidate	Votes
Co-operative Commonwealth	George Hugh Castleden	9,158
Liberal	Alan Carl Stewart	5,591
Progressive Conservative	John Hnatyshyn	3,966

1949 Canadian federal election
Party	Candidate	Votes
Liberal	Alan Carl Stewart	8,706
Co-operative Commonwealth	George Hugh Castleden	8,419
Social Credit	Stanley Wowk	1,111
Progressive Conservative	John Renton Dunlop	858

1953 Canadian federal election
Party	Candidate	Votes
Co-operative Commonwealth	George Hugh Castleden	11,027
Liberal	Patrick Sheehan O'Dwyer	7,399
Social Credit	Stanley Obodiac	1,915
Labor–Progressive	John Paluck	751

1957 Canadian federal election
Party	Candidate	Votes
Co-operative Commonwealth	George Hugh Castleden	9,712
Liberal	Dmytro Hluchaniuk	8,414
Progressive Conservative	Gordon Drummond Clancy	2,342
Social Credit	Robert John Craig	1,967

1958 Canadian federal election
Party	Candidate	Votes
Progressive Conservative	Gordon Drummond Clancy	9,882
Co-operative Commonwealth	George Hugh Castleden	7,644
Liberal	Dmytro Hluchaniuk	4,986

1962 Canadian federal election
Party	Candidate	Votes
Progressive Conservative	Gordon Drummond Clancy	10,202
Liberal	Dmytro Hluchaniuk	5,768
New Democratic	Leonard M. Larson	5,453
Social Credit	Martin Kelln	1,775

1963 Canadian federal election
Party	Candidate	Votes
Progressive Conservative	Gordon Drummond Clancy	12,443
New Democratic	Leonard M. Larson	5,083
Liberal	J.H. Ross	4,425
Social Credit	Wilfrid D. Burnley	1,148

1965 Canadian federal election
Party	Candidate	Votes
Progressive Conservative	Gordon Drummond Clancy	10,561
New Democratic	Alex G. Kuziak	7,326
Liberal	John A. Simpson	4,338

== See also ==
- Yorkton (provincial electoral district)
- Yorkton (N.W.T. electoral district)
- List of Canadian federal electoral districts
- Historical federal electoral districts of Canada
