= Hollis Beckett =

Canadian politician

Hollis Edward Beckett

Ontario MPP
- In office 1951–1967
- Preceded by: Agnes Macphail
- Succeeded by: Arthur Meen
- Constituency: York East

Personal details
- Born: June 22, 1896 Scarborough, Ontario
- Died: October 22, 1976 (aged 80)
- Party: Progressive Conservative
- Spouse: Emily Stephens Copeland
- Occupation: Lawyer

Hollis Edward Beckett (June 22, 1896 – October 22, 1976) was a politician in Ontario, Canada. He was a Progressive Conservative member of the Legislative Assembly of Ontario who represented the riding of York East from 1951 to 1967.

== Background ==
Beckett was born in Scarborough, Ontario to George M. Beckett and Margaret P. Drew. He married Emily Stephens Copeland, who was born in Collingwood, Ontario, on September 24, 1927, in York, Ontario.

== Politics ==
He was elected in the general election in 1951, Beckett defeated Agnes Macphail, the CCF MPP, one of the most prominent socialists in Ontario. Beckett was re-elected in the general elections in 1955, 1959, and 1963.

In 1958, he defeated a challenge by Richard Rohmer for the Progressive Conservative nomination.

He served as a backbench member in governments headed by Premiers Leslie Frost and John Robarts.

On March 27, 1961, Beckett was appointed the Chair of a Select Committee of the Legislative Assembly whose goal was the review and consolidation of the Municipal act and all related Acts, including the Planning Act, the Assessment Act and the Ontario Municipal Board Act. The Committee presented its Final Report on June 15, 1967 and the work of the Committee formed the basis of legislative reforms which remained in effect for over thirty years.
