= John Lane (Ontario politician) =

Canadian politician

Member of Provincial Parliament
- In office 1875–1879
- Preceded by: Hugh Crosby
- Succeeded by: George Badgerow
- Constituency: York East

Personal details
- Born: November 28, 1818 County Tipperary, Ireland
- Died: April 2, 1890 (aged 71) Thornhill, Ontario
- Party: Liberal
- Spouse: Sarah Barker (1825 - 1887)

John Lane (November 28, 1818 – April 2, 1890) was an Irish-born political figure. He represented York East in the Legislative Assembly of Ontario as a Liberal member from 1875 to 1879.

He was born in County Tipperary, Ireland in 1818 but grew up and was educated in Upper Canada. He married Sarah Barker in 1850. Lane served on the council for York County.

== Electoral history ==
1875 Ontario general election: York East
Party	Candidate	Votes	%	±%
Liberal	John Lane	1,266	54.26	−15.92
Conservative	W. McDougall	1,067	45.74	+15.92
Total valid votes		2,333	63.16	+26.64
Eligible voters		3,694		
Liberal hold		Swing		−15.92
Source: Elections Ontario
