= Grey South (federal electoral district) =

Former federal electoral district in Ontario, Canada

Ontario electoral district

Defunct federal electoral district
- Legislature: House of Commons
- District created: 1867
- District abolished: 1914
- First contested: 1867
- Last contested: 1911

Grey South was a federal electoral district represented in the House of Commons of Canada from 1876 to 1917. It was located in the province of Ontario. It was created by the British North America Act 1867 which divided the County of Grey into two ridings: Grey South and Grey North.

The South Riding consisted of the Townships of Bentinck, Glenelg, Artemesia, Osprey, Normanby, Egremont, Proton and Melancthon. In 1872, the County of Grey was divided into three ridings when Grey East was created. The townships of Artemesia, Osprey, Proton and Melancthon were excluded from the south riding. In 1882, the township of Artemesia and the town of Durham were incorporated into the riding. In 1903, the township of Sullivan and the village of Hanover were incorporated into the riding.

The electoral district was abolished in 1914 when it was merged into Grey Southeast riding.

== Members of Parliament ==
This riding has elected the following members of Parliament:

Parliament	Years	Member	Party
1st	1867–1872	George Jackson	Conservative
2nd	1872–1874	George Landerkin	Liberal
3rd	1874–1848	George Landerkin	Liberal
4th	1878–1882	George Jackson	Liberal–Conservative
5th	1882–1887	George Landerkin	Liberal
6th	1887–1891	George Landerkin	Liberal
7th	1891–1896	George Landerkin	Liberal
8th	1896–1900	George Landerkin	Liberal
9th	1900–1904	Matthew Kendal Richardson	Liberal–Conservative
10th	1904–1908	Henry Horton Miller	Liberal
11th	1908–1911	Henry Horton Miller	Liberal
12th	1911–1917	Robert James Ball	Conservative
Riding dissolved into Grey Southeast

== Election results ==
1867 Canadian federal election
Party	Candidate	Votes
Conservative	George Jackson	1,560
Unknown	R. Dalgleish	1,547
Eligible voters		3,885
Source: Canadian Parliamentary Guide, 1871

1872 Canadian federal election
Party	Candidate	Votes
Liberal	George Landerkin	1,150
Conservative	George Jackson	977
Source: Canadian Elections Database

1874 Canadian federal election
Party	Candidate	Votes
Liberal	George Landerkin	1,248
Unknown	? Prebble	863

1878 Canadian federal election
Party	Candidate	Votes
Liberal–Conservative	George Jackson	1,163
Liberal	George Landerkin	1,082

1882 Canadian federal election
Party	Candidate	Votes
Liberal	George Landerkin	1,765
Liberal–Conservative	Geo. Jackson	1,689

1887 Canadian federal election
Party	Candidate	Votes
Liberal	George Landerkin	2,292
Conservative	David Jamieson	2,195

1891 Canadian federal election
Party	Candidate	Votes
Liberal	George Landerkin	2,284
Conservative	John Blyth	2,281

1896 Canadian federal election
Party	Candidate	Votes
Liberal	George Landerkin	1,819
Conservative	David Jameson	1,753
Patrons of Industry	William Allan	1,196

1900 Canadian federal election
Party	Candidate	Votes
Liberal–Conservative	Matthew Richardson	2,375
Liberal	George Landerkin	2,231

1904 Canadian federal election
Party	Candidate	Votes
Liberal	Henry Horton Miller	2,227
Conservative	Charles McKinnon	1,911

1908 Canadian federal election
Party	Candidate	Votes
Liberal	Henry Horton Miller	2,267
Conservative	Robert James Ball	2,180

1911 Canadian federal election
Party	Candidate	Votes
Conservative	Robert James Ball	2,139
Liberal	Henry Horton Miller	2,091

== See also ==
- List of Canadian electoral districts
- Historical federal electoral districts of Canada
