= John Richardson (Ontario MPP) =

Canadian politician

Member of Provincial Parliament
- In office 1894–1904
- Preceded by: George Byron Smith
- Succeeded by: Alexander McCowan
- Constituency: York East

Personal details
- Born: April 5, 1843 Scarborough, Canada West
- Died: August 26, 1915 (aged 72) Toronto, Ontario
- Party: Liberal
- Occupation: Farmer

John Richardson (April 5, 1843 – August 26, 1915) was an Ontario farmer and political figure. He represented York East in the Legislative Assembly of Ontario from 1894 to 1904 as a Liberal member.

He was born in Scarborough, Canada West and was educated at Victoria College in Cobourg. Richardson served on the township council for Scarborough from 1876 to 1894, serving as reeve from 1881 to 1894, and also served as warden for York County.

He died in 1915., and interred at Washington Cemetery in Scarborough.
