= George Badgerow =

Canadian politician

George Washington Badgerow

Member of Provincial Parliament
- In office 1879–1886
- Preceded by: John Lane
- Succeeded by: George Byron Smith
- Constituency: York East

Personal details
- Born: May 24, 1841 Markham Township, Canada West
- Died: July 31, 1892 (aged 51) Buffalo, New York, U.S.A.
- Party: Liberal
- Spouse: Rachel Mulholland (1846-1907)
- Occupation: Teacher, lawyer

George Washington Badgerow (May 24, 1841 – July 31, 1892) was an Ontario lawyer and political figure. He represented York East in the Legislative Assembly of Ontario from 1879 to 1886 as a Liberal member.

He was born in Markham Township, Upper Canada in 1841, the son of Martin Badgerow (1808-1878), who had come to Markham from New York state, and Annie Harrington Badgerow (1811-1894). Badgerow worked on the family farm, taught school, then studied law and was called to the Ontario bar in 1871. He set up practice in Toronto. In 1867, he married Rachel Mulholland (1846-1907). He was named Crown Attorney for the city of Toronto and York County in 1887. Badgerow was chosen as Supreme Master Workman of the Ancient Order of United Workmen in 1886, after stepping down from further nomination before the 1886 Ontario general election. He moved to Bermuda in 1890 following a period of ill-health, and on the death of son George Austin (1870-1890), briefly returned to the area, and later died at Buffalo, NY. He was interred at Mount Pleasant Cemetery, Toronto .
