= Robert James Ball =

Canadian politician (1857–1928)

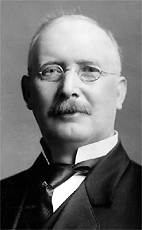

Member of Parliament for Grey South
- In office 1911–1917
- Preceded by: Henry Horton Miller
- Succeeded by: riding abolished

Member of Parliament for Grey Southeast
- In office 1917–1921
- Preceded by: first member
- Succeeded by: Agnes MacPhail

Personal details
- Born: January 15, 1857 Allan Park, Canada West
- Died: February 26, 1928 (aged 71)
- Party: Conservative
- Profession: accountant, life insurance agent, teacher

Robert James Ball (January 15, 1857 – February 26, 1928) was a Canadian politician, accountant, life insurance agent and teacher. He was elected to the House of Commons of Canada in 1911 as a Member of the Conservative Party to represent the riding of Grey South after being defeated in 1908. He was re-elected in 1917 to Grey Southeast and joined the Unionist Party coalition on March 18, 1918. He was defeated in 1921 by Agnes MacPhail who thus became the first woman elected to the Canadian House of Commons.

Ball was born in Allan Park, Canada West. Prior to his federal political career, he was a town councillor in Hanover, Ontario for three years and reeve for two years.

1908 Canadian federal election: Grey South
Party	Candidate	Votes
Liberal	Henry Horton Miller	2,267
Conservative	Robert James Ball	2,180

1911 Canadian federal election: Grey South
Party	Candidate	Votes
Conservative	Robert James Ball	2,139
Liberal	Henry Horton Miller	2,091
