= George Jackson (Canadian politician) =

Canadian politician

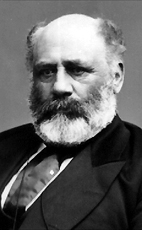

Member of the Canadian Parliament for Grey South
- In office 1867–1872
- Succeeded by: George Landerkin
- In office 1878–1882
- Preceded by: George Landerkin
- Succeeded by: George Landerkin

Personal details
- Born: 1 December 1808 Fearby, Yorkshire, England
- Died: 6 March 1885 (aged 76) Durham, Ontario, Canada
- Party: Liberal-Conservative
- Spouse: Susan Merritt
- Occupation: mill owner, politician

George Jackson (1 December 1808 – 6 March 1885) was a Canadian mill owner and politician from Durham, Ontario. He served as a representative in the Canadian Assembly and, after Confederation, as a Member of Parliament for the electoral district of Grey South.

Jackson was born in Fearby, Yorkshire, was educated in Yorkshire and became a merchant in the city of Durham in England. In 1844, he immigrated to Canada and purchased a mill near Hurontario (now Collingwood). He expanded and built other mills at the site.

In 1832, he married Susan Merritt.

Jackson served from 1848 to 1854 as the crown land agent for both Grey and Bruce Counties. In 1854, he was elected to represent Grey in the Canadian Assembly, and reelected several times. Jackson also served as warden for Grey County from 1858 to 1860 and reeve of Bentinck (later Durham). When the colonies of Canada were confederated, he was elected to represent the Grey South district as an MP in the House of Commons of Canada in 1867. He was defeated by George Landerkin in 1872 but was later returned to parliament, serving from 1878 until 1882.

Jackson first entered politics as a Liberal, but chose to support John A. Macdonald and became a Conservative, although from 1878 he caucused as a Liberal-Conservative. He retired from politics after being defeated in 1882 and died in 1885 at Durham.

== Electoral record ==
1867 Canadian federal election: Grey South
Party	Candidate	Votes
Conservative	George Jackson	1,560
Unknown	R. Dalgleish	1,547
Eligible voters		3,885
Source: Canadian Parliamentary Guide, 1871

1872 Canadian federal election: Grey South
Party	Candidate	Votes
Liberal	George Landerkin	1,150
Conservative	George Jackson	977
Source: Canadian Elections Database

1878 Canadian federal election: Grey South
Party	Candidate	Votes
Liberal–Conservative	George Jackson	1,163
Liberal	George Landerkin	1,082
Source: Canadian Elections Database
