= Alexander McCowan =

Canadian politician

Member of Provincial Parliament
- In office 1905–1913
- Preceded by: John Richardson
- Succeeded by: George Stewart Henry
- Constituency: York East

Personal details
- Born: May 27, 1853 Scarborough Township, Canada West
- Died: April 17, 1939 Toronto, Ontario, Canada
- Party: Conservative
- Spouse(s): Georgina Ashbridge; Mary Marshall
- Occupation: Dairy farmer

Alexander McCowan (May 27, 1853 – April 17, 1939) was an Ontario farmer and political figure. He represented York East in the Legislative Assembly of Ontario from 1905 to 1913 as a Conservative member.

He was born in Scarborough Township, Canada West, the son of James W. McCowan, an immigrant from Scotland. He resigned his seat in the provincial assembly in 1913 and was appointed sheriff for York County, serving until 1934. In 1891, he married Georgina Ashbridge, from a pioneer family, residing in the eastern end of the growing city of Toronto. She died in childbirth later that year. He later married Mary Marshall in 1894. McCowan was a dairy farmer and was secretary-treasurer of the Toronto Milk Producers' Association, one of the first milk marketing organizations in Canada. He was also secretary-treasurer for the Scarboro Agricultural Society. Near his farm, the concession road (between Scarborough's Lot 22 and 23) was initially named McCowan's Road after the family, and later changed to McCowan Road, and runs through the former riding in the present cities of Toronto, and Markham.

In the 1905 Ontario general election, McCowan defeated a new Liberal candidate, Walter Scott, as incumbent and former Scarborough Township Reeve John Richardson (Ontario MPP) had resigned prior to the Election to become York County Court Clerk. Meanwhile, McCowan and 25 other Conservative MPP's became the governing party under Premier Sir James P. Whitney. He won two more elections, in 1908 and in 1911.

He resigned in 1913, to become Sheriff of York County in a role he served until his 1935 resignation. His replacement in the riding was future premier of Ontario (1930-1934) George Stewart Henry.

In retirement, he moved into the East Toronto neighbourhood of the City of Toronto, and died there in 1939. He and his family are buried in the historic St. Andrew's Scarborough Cemetery.
