= Unity (Canada) =

Unity, United Progressive Movement and United Reform were the names used in Canada by a popular front party initiated by the Communist Party of Canada in the late 1930s.

== United Progressive/Unity in Saskatchewan ==
Two of the movement's members, Dorise Nielsen and Walter George Brown, were elected to the federal House of Commons in the 1940 Canadian election and two United Progressives, Alan Carl Stewart and Herman Kersler Warren, were elected to the Legislative Assembly of Saskatchewan in the 1938 provincial election. The unity movement included Communists, members of the Co-operative Commonwealth Federation (despite objections from the CCF leadership), supporters of the Canadian social credit movement, and other populists and reformers opposed to the Liberal and Conservative parties.

Dorise Nielsen was elected in North Battleford under the Unity label, and Walter George Brown was elected as a United Reform Member of Parliament in Saskatoon City.

Nielsen was a supporter of the Communist Party and ran for re-election in 1945 federal election as a Labor-Progressive Party candidate (the name adopted by the Communist Party after it was banned) and was defeated.

=== United Reform in Saskatoon ===
The United Reform Movement or United Reform was an attempt in Saskatoon, Saskatchewan, Canada, to create a left wing farmer-labour coalition. It was part of an effort in Saskatchewan and Alberta by the Communist Party of Canada to create a united front bringing together the Co-operative Commonwealth Federation, Communists, other leftists and even the populist Social Credit movement against the Liberals and Conservatives. While the movement was opposed and denounced by the leadership of the CCF it succeeded in some areas to bring local CCF activists on board.

Clergyman Walter George Brown won election to the House of Commons as a United Reform Movement candidate in a 1939 by-election in the riding of Saskatoon City, and was re-elected in the 1940 general election with the endorsement of the National Government party (as the Tories were called in 1940). He died on April 1, 1940, five days after being re-elected.

The URM recruited Agnes Macphail, a longtime Member of Parliament (MP) who had been defeated in the 1940 election to run in the by-election to fill Brown's vacancy. MacPhail had been an MP since 1921, first as a representative for the Progressive Party of Canada and since 1930 as a United Farmers of Ontario-Labour MP, although she was active with the Co-operative Commonwealth Federation. In deference to her nominators, she ran as a "United Reform" candidate in the August 1940 by-election, but was defeated by the Conservative candidate.

There was also a "United Reform" candidate in the Saskatchewan riding of Weyburn who ran in the 1940 general election against Tommy Douglas of the CCF.

== United Progressive in Alberta ==
In the 1940 federal election, William Halina sought election to the Canadian House of Commons in the riding of Vegreville, Alberta under the United Progressive banner. Halina won 2,727 votes, or 19.4% of the total cast, placing third behind the Social Credit and Liberal candidates, but ahead of the Co-operative Commonwealth Federation candidate. Halina ran for the communist Labor-Progressive Party in the 1945 election.

== See also ==
- Labor-Progressive Party
- Communist Party (Alberta)
- List of political parties in Canada
- Walter George Brown
- Politics of Saskatchewan
- Communist Party of Canada (Saskatchewan)
