= York East (provincial electoral district) =

Former provincial electoral district in Ontario, Canada

Ontario electoral district

Defunct provincial electoral district
- Legislature: Legislative Assembly of Ontario
- District created: 1867
- District abolished: 1996
- First contested: 1867
- Last contested: 1995

York East was a provincial electoral district in Ontario, Canada. It was formed in 1867, the same year as the beginning of the country and it elected members up until 1999 when it was dissolved. Initially it covered a large swath of territory stretching from Lake Ontario north to Richmond Hill. It was formed based on the eastern part of the county of York. Over time as the population increased, the territory was reduced. By the late 1950s it represented only a portion of the borough of East York, a small municipality on the edge of Toronto. In 1999 it was abolished and its remaining territory was distributed between Beaches—East York and Don Valley West ridings.

== Boundaries ==
In 1867, the County of York was subdivided into three ridings, York East, York North, and York West. York East consisted of the townships of Markham, Scarborough, and any areas east of Yonge Street excluding the city of Toronto. It also included the village of Yorkville. These boundaries coincided with the Federal riding of the same name. In 1874, the village of Richmond Hill was removed. In 1885, Richmond Hill was added back.

In 1926 portions of the riding were lost to the new ridings of Eglinton and Beaches. This reflected changes to the boundaries of the city of Toronto.

In 1955, following the incorporation of Metropolitan Toronto, Scarborough Township was separated and York Scarborough became a separate riding. Eight years later, that riding was divided into four further separate ridings.

By 1963, the boundaries had been reduced to encompass a portion of territory within the bounds of Metro Toronto. This consisted of the area South of Steeles Avenue East, west of Victoria Park Avenue and east of Yonge Street, excluding the area within the old city of Toronto. Also in 1963, the riding was subdivided into three parts. The northern portion became the new riding of York Mills, the middle portion became the riding of Don Mills and the southern portion retained the name York East.

Except for minor boundary changes, the riding stayed much the same until it was dissolved in 1999.

== Members of Provincial Parliament ==
York East
Assembly	Years	Member	Party
1st	1867–1871	Hugh Powell Crosby	Liberal
2nd	1871–1875	Hugh Powell Crosby	Liberal
3rd	1875–1879	John Lane	Liberal
4th	1879–1883	George Badgerow	Liberal
5th	1883–1886	George Badgerow	Liberal
6th	1886–1890	George Byron Smith	Liberal
7th	1890–1894	George Byron Smith	Liberal
8th	1894–1898	John Richardson	Liberal
9th	1898–1902	John Richardson	Liberal
10th	1902–1905	John Richardson	Liberal
11th	1905–1908	Alexander McCowan (Note: Resigned to accept appointment.)	Conservative
12th	1908–1911	Alexander McCowan	Conservative
13th	1911–1913	Alexander McCowan	Conservative
13th	1913–1914	George Stewart Henry (Note: In 1938, the title of Member of the Legislative Assembly was officially changed to Member of Provincial Parliament. Previously, it was unofficially used in the media and in the Legislature.)	Conservative
14th	1914–1919	George Stewart Henry	Conservative
15th	1919–1923	George Stewart Henry	Conservative
16th	1923–1926	George Stewart Henry	Conservative
17th	1926–1929	George Stewart Henry	Conservative
18th	1929–1934	George Stewart Henry	Conservative
19th	1934–1937	George Stewart Henry	Conservative
20th	1937–1943	George Stewart Henry	Conservative
21st	1943–1945	Agnes Macphail	Co-operative Commonwealth
22nd	1945–1948	John A. Leslie	Progressive Conservative
23rd	1948–1951	Agnes Macphail	Co-operative Commonwealth
24th	1951–1955	Hollis Beckett	Progressive Conservative
25th	1955–1959	Hollis Beckett	Progressive Conservative
26th	1959–1963	Hollis Beckett	Progressive Conservative
27th	1963–1967	Hollis Beckett	Progressive Conservative
28th	1967–1971	Arthur Meen	Progressive Conservative
29th	1971–1975	Arthur Meen	Progressive Conservative
30th	1975–1977	Arthur Meen	Progressive Conservative
31st	1977–1981	Robert Elgie (Note: Resigned September 26, 1985 to accept appointment as head of Worker's Compensation Board.)	Progressive Conservative
32nd	1981–1985	Robert Elgie	Progressive Conservative
33rd	1985–1986	Robert Elgie	Progressive Conservative
33rd	1986–1987	Christine Hart	Liberal
34th	1987–1990	Christine Hart	Liberal
35th	1990–1995	Gary Malkowski	New Democratic
36th	1995–1999	John Parker	Progressive Conservative
Sourced from the Ontario Legislative Assembly
Merged into Beaches—East York and Don Valley West ridings after 1999

== Election results ==
1867 Ontario general election
Party	Candidate	Votes	%
Liberal	Hugh Powell Crosby	1,193	58.25
Conservative	J. Boman	855	41.75
Total valid votes		2,048	72.37
Eligible voters		2,830	
Liberal pickup new district.			
Source: Elections Ontario

1871 Ontario general election
Party	Candidate	Votes	%	±%
Liberal	Hugh Powell Crosby	791	70.19	+11.93
Conservative	Mr. Hosteller	336	29.81	−11.93
Turnout		1,127	36.52	−35.85
Eligible voters		3,086		
Liberal hold		Swing		+11.93
Source: Elections Ontario

1875 Ontario general election
Party	Candidate	Votes	%	±%
Liberal	John Lane	1,266	54.26	−15.92
Conservative	W. McDougall	1,067	45.74	+15.92
Total valid votes		2,333	63.16	+26.64
Eligible voters		3,694		
Liberal hold		Swing		−15.92
Source: Elections Ontario

1879 Ontario general election
Party	Candidate	Votes	%	±%
Liberal	George Badgerow	1,825	53.58	−0.68
Conservative	C.O. Robinson	1,581	46.42	+0.68
Total valid votes		3,406	58.93	−4.23
Eligible voters		5,780		
Liberal hold		Swing		−0.68
Source: Elections Ontario

=== 1977 ===
- Robert Elgie (PC) 14131
- Lois Cox (NDP) 8334
- Mike Kenny (L) 7126
- Chris Greenland (Ind [SC?]) 265
- Maura O'Neill (Comm) 245
- Paul Wakfer (Lbt) 144

=== 1981 ===
- Robert Elgie (PC) 14562
- Lois Cox (NDP) 4935
- Don McNeill (L) 4811
- Ed McDonald (Comm) 628
- E. Scott Hughes (Unparty) 460

=== 1985 ===
- Robert Elgie (PC) 11459
- Gord Crann (NDP) 9183
- Omar Chaudhery (L) 6629
- Ed McDonald (Comm) 929
- Kathy Sorensen (Lbt) 410

=== 1987 ===
- Christine Hart (L) 15683
- Peter Oyler (PC) 7352
- Sophia Apostolides (NDP) 7056
- Chris Frazer (Comm) 527

=== 1990 ===
- Gary Malkowski (NDP) 10,689 (35.8%)
- Christine Hart (L) 9900 (33.2%)
- George Bryson (PC) 8021 (26.9%)
- Jim Copeland 380 (1.3%)
- Bedora Bojman (G) 364 (1.2%)
- John Matthew (Lbt) 303 (1.0%)
- Chris Frazer (Comm) 191 (0.6%)

=== 1995 ===
- John Parker (PC) 12789
- Gary Malkowski (NDP) 9526
- Steve Mastoras (L) 7398
- Steve Kotsopoulos (Ind) 497
- John Richardson (Ind) 251
- Marilyn Pepper (NLP) 243

== See also ==
- List of Ontario provincial electoral districts
- Canadian provincial electoral districts
