= George Washington McPhee =

Canadian politician (1880–1971)

George Washington McPhee, QC (November 17, 1880 – November 23, 1971) was a lawyer, judge and political figure in Prince Edward Island and Saskatchewan. He represented 2nd Queens in the Legislative Assembly of Prince Edward Island in 1911 and Yorkton in the House of Commons of Canada from 1925 to 1940 as a Liberal.

He was born in St. Catherines, Lot 65, Prince Edward Island, the son of Annie Rogerson (née McPhee), and was educated at Prince of Wales College. McPhee taught school for five years, then articled in law, was admitted to the bar in 1910 and practised briefly in Charlottetown. He was elected to the provincial assembly in a 1911 by-election held after William Laird resigned for health reasons; McPhee was defeated when he ran for reelection in 1912. He later moved to Yorkton, Saskatchewan, where he served as crown prosecutor from 1915 to 1918. In 1917, McPhee was an unsuccessful candidate for the Mackenzie seat in the House of Commons. In 1920, he was named King's Counsel. He was named a judge in the District and Surrogate Courts for Moose Jaw district in 1940. In 1943, he was named a Rental Appeal Judge for southern Saskatchewan. McPhee was buried in British Columbia.
