= Agnes Macphail =

Canadian politician and activist

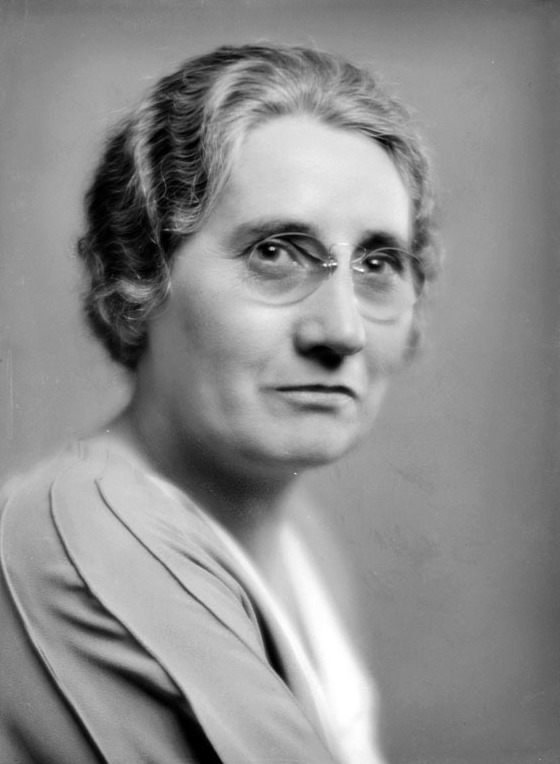
- Portrait by Yousuf Karsh, 1934

Co-leader of the Ontario CCF de facto while party chairman
- In office 1932–1934 Serving with Elmore Philpott (as president of Ontario CCF clubs)
- Preceded by: new position
- Succeeded by: John Mitchell (as party president)

Member of Ontario Provincial Parliament for York East
- In office June 7, 1948 – November 22, 1951
- Preceded by: John A. Leslie
- Succeeded by: Hollis Edward Beckett
- In office August 4, 1943 – June 4, 1945
- Preceded by: George Stewart Henry
- Succeeded by: John A. Leslie

Member of Parliament for Grey—Bruce
- In office October 14, 1935 – March 26, 1940
- Preceded by: New riding
- Succeeded by: Walter Harris

Member of Parliament for Grey Southeast
- In office December 6, 1921 – October 14, 1935
- Preceded by: Robert James Ball
- Succeeded by: Riding abolished

Personal details
- Born: Agnes Campbell Macphail; March 24, 1890 Proton Township, Grey County, Ontario, Canada
- Died: February 13, 1954 (aged 63) Toronto, Ontario, Canada
- Party: Progressive (1921–1935); Co-operative Commonwealth Federation, Ontario CCF (1932–1934, 1942–1954); UFO-Labour (1935–1940); United Reform Movement (1940)
- Other political affiliations: Ginger Group; United Farmers of Ontario
- Occupation: Politician; journalist; schoolteacher

Agnes Campbell Macphail (March 24, 1890 – February 13, 1954) was a Canadian politician and the first woman elected to Canada's House of Commons. She served as a Member of Parliament (MP) from 1921 to 1940; from 1943 to 1945 and again from 1948 to 1951, she served as a member of the Legislative Assembly of Ontario, representing the Toronto riding of York East. Active throughout her life in progressive politics, Macphail worked for multiple parties, most prominently the Progressive Party, the Co-operative Commonwealth Federation and the United Farmers of Ontario. She promoted her ideas through column-writing, activist organizing, and legislation.

== Background ==
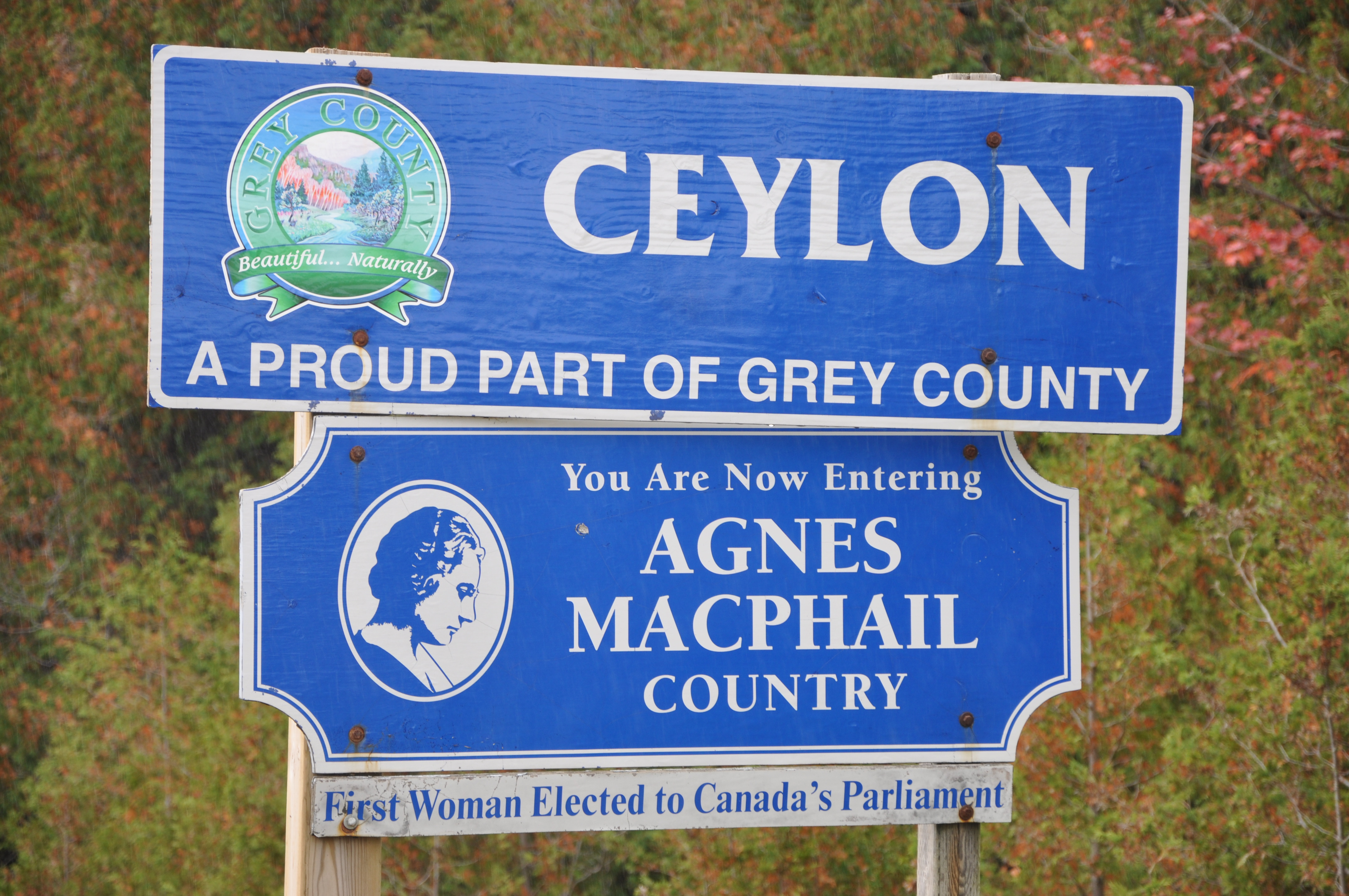
"Agnes Macphail Country" sign at eastern approach to Ceylon, Ontario

Agnes Macphail was born to Dougald McPhail and Henrietta Campbell in Proton Township, Grey County, Ontario.

Although her surname was spelled "McPhail" at birth, she discovered during a later trip to Scotland that her family's surname had been spelled as "Macphail" and changed her name to reflect this.

She was raised in the Methodist Church, but converted to the Reorganized Latter Day Saint church as a teenager. This was the church of her missionary uncle. In later years she joined the United Church of Canada, which had absorbed the Methodist church of her youth.

Macphail attended Owen Sound Collegiate and Vocational Institute for one year. Although she did well, she transferred to Stratford Normal School so she could complete her studies while boarding with a relative. She graduated in 1910 with a second-class teacher's certificate.

She applied for five positions and was accepted at all five. She later said that this was not due to her competence but to a scarcity of teachers at the time. She taught in several rural Ontario schools in such communities as Port Elgin, Honeywood, and Newmarket. Roots and branches of Saugeen, a local history book, states that Agnes MacPhail was the teacher in the Gowanlock School, and would "hoist herself up to the counter top" in the Burgoyne Store and argue politics with the "boys" for hours.

While working in Sharon, Macphail became active politically, joining the United Farmers of Ontario (UFO) and its women's organization, the United Farm Women of Ontario. She also became a columnist for the Farmer's Sun around this time.

As with many prominent people of the era, Macphail was an ardent supporter of eugenics.

== Federal politics ==
After amendments to the Elections Act by the federal Union government in 1919 allowing women to run as candidates, Macphail was elected to the House of Commons as a member of the Progressive Party of Canada for the electoral district of Grey Southeast in the 1921 federal election. She was the first female MP in Canadian history. She was re-elected in the 1925, 1926, and 1930 federal elections.

Macphail objected to the Royal Military College of Canada in 1924 on the grounds that it taught snobbishness and provided a cheap education for the sons of the rich; in 1931 she objected to government support for the college as she opposed it on pacifist grounds.

As a radical member of the Progressive Party, Macphail joined the socialist Ginger Group, a faction of the Progressive Party that later formed Co-operative Commonwealth Federation (CCF).

She became the first president of the Ontario CCF in 1932. However, she left the CCF in 1934 when the United Farmers of Ontario pulled out over fears of Communist influence in the Ontario CCF. While Macphail was no longer formally a CCF member, she remained close to the CCF MPs and often participated in caucus meetings. The CCF did not run candidates against Macphail in her three subsequent federal campaigns.

In the 1935 federal election, Macphail was again elected, this time as a United Farmers of Ontario–Labour MP for the newly formed Grey—Bruce riding. She was allowed to use the party's name, even after it stopped being a political organization in 1934. She was always a strong voice for rural issues.

Macphail was also a strong advocate for prison reform and her efforts contributed to the launch of the investigative Archambault Commission in 1936. The final report became the basis for reform in Canadian penitentiaries following World War II.

Macphail's concern for women in the criminal justice system led her, in 1939, to found the Elizabeth Fry Society of Canada, named after British reformer Elizabeth Fry.

Causes she championed included pensions for seniors and workers' rights. Macphail was also the first Canadian woman delegate to the League of Nations in Geneva, Switzerland, where she worked with the World Disarmament Committee. Although a pacifist, she voted for Canada to enter World War II.

In the 1940 election, she was defeated. With the death of United Reform MP for Saskatoon City, Walter George Brown, a few days after the election, Macphail was recruited by the United Reform Movement to run in the by-election to fill the seat. On August 19, she was defeated by Progressive Conservative candidate Alfred Henry Bence. He received 4,798 votes, while Macphail placed second with 4,057 votes.

It was her last federal campaign as a candidate.

== Journalist ==
Macphail was a frequent contributor to newspapers in Grey County such as the Flesherton Advance and Markdale Standard, often acting as a correspondent or ambassador to the rest of the country.

She wrote dispatches from Parliament about political news of interest to the rural communities back home, and contributed columns when she travelled and spoke to citizens in other regions. She also wrote a number of pieces for The Farmer's Sun, an Ontario progressive weekly, including a number of reminiscences about rural Ontario history.

Out of office, she wrote agricultural columns for The Globe and Mail newspaper in Toronto and contributed pieces about politics to the Newmarket Era.

Following a family tragedy in her home town, Macphail moved to the Toronto suburb of East York, Ontario. She rejoined the Ontario CCF in 1942, where she became its farm organizer.

== Provincial politics ==
In the 1943 provincial election, Macphail was elected to the Legislative Assembly of Ontario as a member of the Ontario CCF representing the suburban Toronto riding of York East. She and Rae Luckock were the first women elected to the Ontario Legislature. She was the first woman sworn in as an Ontario Member of Provincial Parliament (MPP).

Although defeated in the 1945 provincial election, she was elected again in the 1948 election. Macphail was responsible for Ontario's first equal-pay legislation, passed in 1951, but was unable to continue her efforts when she was defeated in elections later that year. At that time, Macphail was barely able to support herself through journalism, public speaking and organizing for the Ontario CCF.

Macphail was eager to see more women in politics. She explained: "Most women think politics aren't lady-like. Well, I'm no lady. I'm a human being."

Macphail never married. She died February 13, 1954, aged 63, in Toronto, just before she was to have been offered an appointment to the Senate of Canada.

She is buried in Priceville, Ontario, with her parents and Gertha Macphail, one of her two sisters.

== Electoral record ==
1943 Ontario general election
Party	Candidate	Votes	%	±%
Co-operative Commonwealth	Agnes Macphail	12,016	46.4	
Progressive Conservative	John A. Leslie	10,440	40.3	
Liberal	H.J. McConnell	3,459	13.3	
Total valid votes		25,915	100.0	
Montreal Gazette (Google News)

=== Federal: Saskatoon City ===
Canadian federal by-election, August 19, 1940: Saskatoon City Death of Walter George Brown
Party	Candidate	Votes	%
Conservative	Alfred Henry Bence	4,798	31.53
United Reform Movement	Agnes MacPhail	4,057	26.66
Liberal	Michael Patrick Hayes	2,421	15.91
Independent Liberal	Sidney Walter Johns	2,250	14.79
Independent Social Credit	George Howard Bradbrooke	1,200	7.89
Independent	Agnes Wilna Moore	491	3.23
Total valid votes		15,217	100.00
Source(s) "Saskatoon City, Saskatchewan (1935-08-14 - 1949-04-29)". History of Federal Ridings Since 1867. Library of Parliament.

=== Federal: Grey—Bruce ===
1940 Canadian federal election: Grey—Bruce
Party	Candidate	Votes
Liberal	Walter Edward Harris	6,389
National Government	Karl Daniel Knechtel	4,944
United Farmers of Ontario–Labour	Agnes Macphail	4,761

1935 Canadian federal election: Grey—Bruce
Party	Candidate	Votes
United Farmers of Ontario–Labour	Agnes Macphail	7,210
Liberal	Walter Allan Hall	5,727
Conservative	Lewis G. Campbell	5,100

=== Federal: Grey Southeast ===
1930 Canadian federal election
Party	Candidate	Votes
Progressive	Agnes Campbell MacPhail	6,619
Liberal	Lewis G. Campbell	6,376

1926 Canadian federal election
Party	Candidate	Votes
Progressive	Agnes Campbell MacPhail	7,939
Conservative	Robert Thomas Edwards	6,211

1925 Canadian federal election
Party	Candidate	Votes
Progressive	Agnes C. MacPhail	6,652
Conservative	Lewis G. Campbell	5,245

1921 Canadian federal election
Party	Candidate	Votes
Progressive	Agnes Campbell MacPhail	6,958
Conservative	Robert James Ball	4,360
Liberal	Walter Hastie	2,638

== Legacy ==
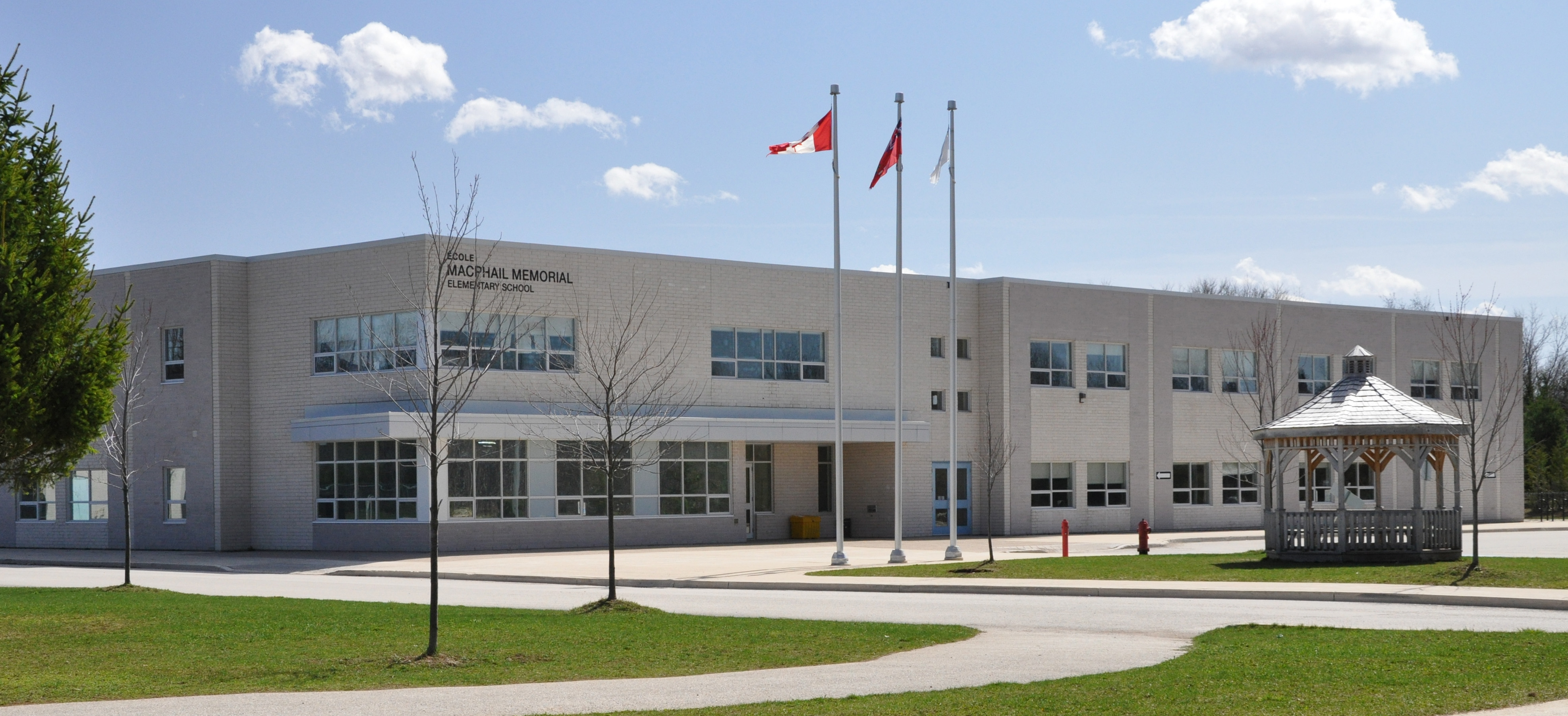
Macphail Memorial Elementary School in Flesherton, Ontario was named for Agnes Macphail

=== Firsts ===
==== Electoral & Parliamentary Firsts ====
- First female Member of Parliament (MP) in Canadian history. (elected in the 1921 federal election).

==== Party & Political Organization Firsts ====
- First president of the Ontario Co-operative Commonwealth Federation (CCF) (1932).

==== International Representation ====
- First Canadian woman delegate to the League of Nations (Geneva, Switzerland).

==== Provincial Politics Firsts ====
- First woman sworn in as an Ontario Member of Provincial Parliament (MPP).
- One of the first women elected to the Ontario Legislature (alongside Rae Luckock, 1943).

==== Legislative Policy Firsts ====
- Responsible for Ontario’s first equal-pay legislation, passed in 1951.

=== Education and schools ===
Macphail has been widely commemorated through educational institutions. In 1968, when Flesherton High School was replaced by Grey Highlands Secondary School, the former high school building was converted into an elementary school and renamed Macphail Memorial Elementary School. That building was later replaced by a new school of the same name in 2006.

In 1981, a public school in Scarborough, Ontario, was named Agnes Macphail Public School in her honour.

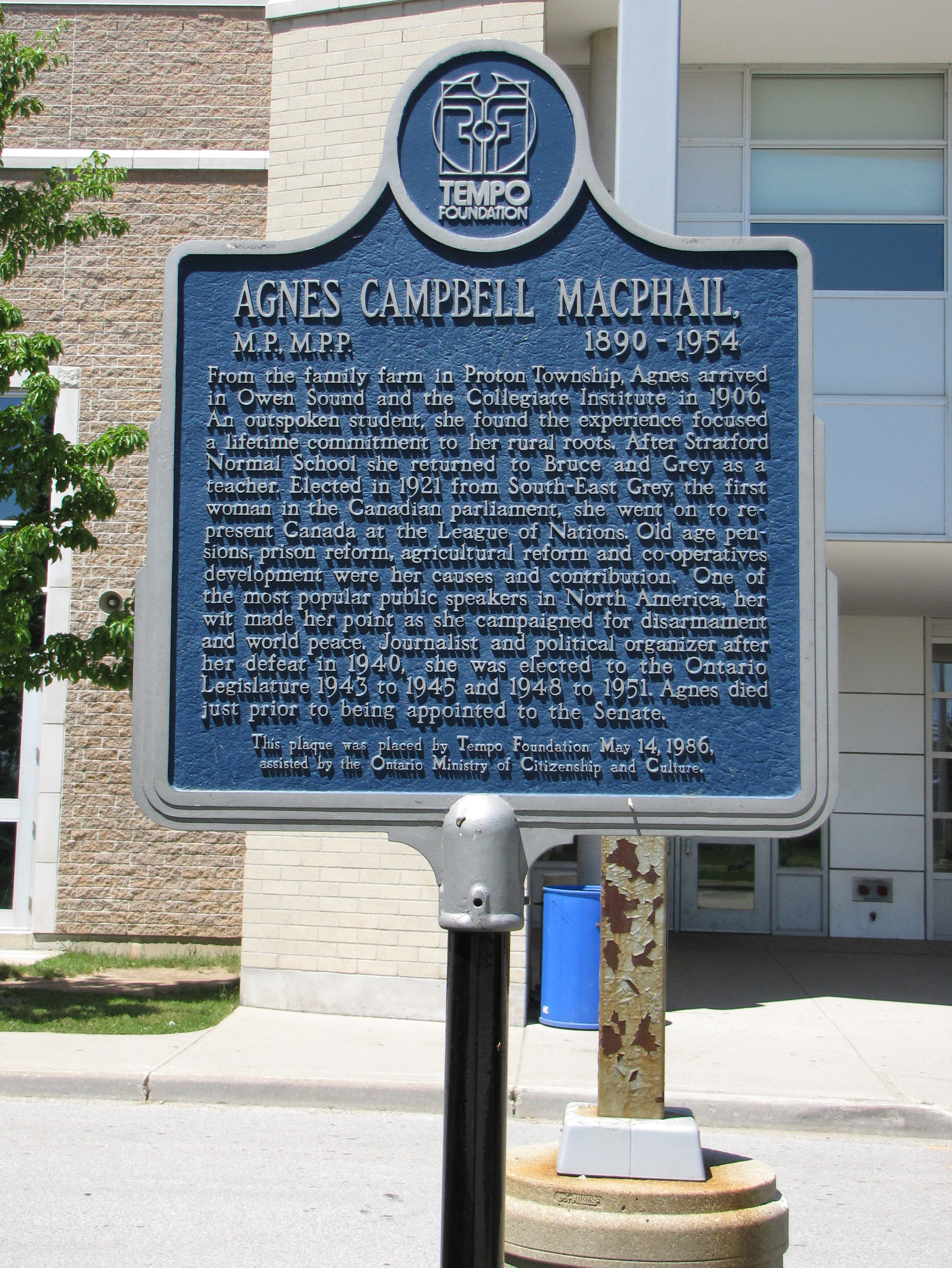
Historical plaque honouring Macphail outside Owen Sound Collegiate & Vocational Institute (OSCVI)

=== Civic honours and named awards ===
In 1993, marking the 50th anniversary of Macphail's election to the Ontario legislature, Michael Prue, then mayor of East York, proclaimed March 24 to be observed annually as Agnes Macphail Day.

The following year, East York Council established the Agnes Macphail Award. Presented annually, the award recognizes a resident of East York who has made outstanding contributions to equality rights and social justice and who exemplifies Macphail's tradition of principled leadership.

In 1997, East York also inaugurated the annual Agnes Macphail public speaking contest for students.

=== Public places and infrastructure ===
Numerous public spaces and community organizations in East York bear Macphail's name, reflecting her lasting association with the area. These include Agnes Macphail Parkette at the corner of Mortimer Street and Pape Avenue, the Agnes Macphail Playground, the Agnes MacPhail Youth Resource Centre, and the Agnes MacPhail Food Bank, all located at 444 Lumsden Avenue.

In 1999, a townhome development built by Brownstone Homes in East York named a street Macphail Avenue, near the intersection of Pape Avenue and Mortimer Street.

On June 24, 2006, a cairn and bronze bust commemorating Macphail's life were unveiled in Hopeville, Ontario. That same year, highway signs reading "You are now entering Agnes Macphail Country" were installed near the hamlet of Ceylon and east of Hopeville. Grey County Road 9, between Highway 6 and Highway 10, was also renamed Agnes MacPhail Road.

An apartment building at 860 Mercer Street in Windsor, Ontario, is named Agnes Macphail Manor.

=== Public recognition and commemoration ===
In 2005, Macphail was voted the Greatest Ontario Woman in a public contest organized by former Ontario MPP Marilyn Churley.

She is also featured on the Canada 150 commemorative edition of the Canadian ten-dollar note, issued in 2017, alongside John A. Macdonald, George-Étienne Cartier, and James Gladstone. Macphail is the first woman other than the sovereign to appear permanently on Canadian currency.

=== In popular culture ===
Macphail has also appeared in dramatized portrayals of early 20th-century Canadian political life. A 2015 episode of Murdoch Mysteries (season 8, episode 17, "Election Day") depicts a young Agnes Macphail, played by Zoe Fraser, showing an early interest in the suffrage movement.

== Archives ==
There is an Agnes Macphail fonds at Library and Archives Canada. Archival reference number is R4413.

== References and notes ==
=== References ===
- Stewart, Margaret; Shackelton, Doris French (1959). Ask no quarter; a biography of Agnes Macphail. Toronto: Longmans, Green.
- Young, Walter D. (1969). The Anatomy of a Party: The National CCF, 1932–61. Toronto: University of Toronto Press. ISBN 0-8020-5221-5.
