= Walter George Brown =

Canadian politician (1875–1940)

Walter Brown

Member of Parliament for Saskatoon City
- In office 1939–1940
- Preceded by: Alexander MacGillivray Young
- Succeeded by: Alfred Henry Bence

Personal details
- Born: 6 September 1875 Athelstan, Quebec, Canada
- Died: 1 April 1940 (aged 64)
- Party: United Reform Movement (1939-1940); Unity (1940)
- Spouse: Martha Rowat
- Profession: Minister

Reverend Walter George Brown (September 6, 1875 – April 1, 1940) was a Presbyterian Church in Canada minister who opposed the formation of the United Church of Canada and was a United Reform Movement MP in the House of Commons of Canada.

== Early life ==
Born in Athelstan (now Hichinbrooke), Huntingdon County, Quebec of Scots-Irish parents, Brown initially decided to become a lawyer and was educated at McGill University where he received a Bachelor of Arts degree in 1899 with first class honours.

He then graduated in 1902 with a B.D. degree from The Presbyterian College, Montreal, the silver medal, a $60.00 Theological Scholarship, and a prize ($10.00 in books) in public speaking. He also won other scholarships and prizes during his time at Presbyterian College. During his summers, he went into the newly opened lumbering camps of Northern Ontario, serving first as a student missionary, was ordained on 30 September 1902 as an Ordained Missionary to Canada Atlantic Lumber Camps, from Rainy Lake to Whitney under the North Bay Presbytery. He remained in this post until July 1903, when he moved west to work amongst miners in the West Kootenay area of British Columbia at Salmo, New Denver and Silverton, all in proximity of Nelson.

While serving in ministry in British Columbia, he earned his M.A. degree from McGill, with a paper titled "History and Philosophy of Socialism", and was married to Martha Rowat; her father, Andrew Rowat (1839–1918) served as minister at Elgin and Athelstan from 1884 - 1909; her mother, Margaret, was the daughter of Donald MacKenziepioneer minister in Zorra Township, Oxford County, Ontario. They have four children, Helen, Rhoda, Jack and Jean.

After leaving the Kootenays to study in Montreal and at the United Free Church of Scotland College in Glasgow, he was called and inducted in March 1908, as minister of Knox Presbyterian Church in Red Deer, Alberta, and would remain there until 1925. He also served as convenor of Home Missions for the Red Deer Presbytery supervising three congregations and fifteen missions. He served as Moderator of the Synod of Alberta in 1915.

== Opposition to United Church merger ==
He had opposed the first attempt to merge the Presbyterian, Methodist and Congregational Churches of Canada in 1904 saying "I cannot recall one moment when I ever doubted that it was our duty to maintain the Presbyterian Church in Canada in the interests of truth, sound church government, spiritual freedom and national righteousness."

He favoured a federation over a total church union. This was highlighted in his 1911 "Alberta Plan", that critiqued the "Union Churches" then being created primarily in Saskatchewan. In 1923, he went on a six-week speaking tour of Eastern Canada for the anti-church union Presbyterian Church Association and became known as "Brown of Red Deer". When the final vote on union was held during late 1924 and early 1925, Brown's Red Deer Presbytery was the sole presbytery in the PCC with a majority vote against Church Union.

Nationally, some 30% of Presbyterians opposed this union and reorganized themselves as the "Continuing Presbyterians", until they were legally permitted to resume using the name Presbyterian Church in Canada in 1939. With regard to the namecontinuing Presbyterians, Brown was quoted during his fight for the preservation of the Presbyterian Church by reciting a Scots challenge:

They may rob us of name, they may hunt us with beagles,
Give our roofs to the flame and our flesh to the eagles...
While there are leaves on the forest or foam on the river,
MacGregor despite them shall flourish forever!

At the 1925 General Assembly, Brown was one of 79 Commissioners who refused to join the United Church, and met in a corner of Toronto's College Street United Church at the conclusion on June 9 in order to resume business later that night at nearby Knox Presbyterian Church and legally claim their continuity.

== Political career ==
He remained in Saskatchewan throughout the Dust Bowl drought years of the Great Depression and, late in the decade, organized the left-wing United Reform Movement as a political party calling for relief.

Brown was first elected as the Member of Parliament for Saskatoon City in a December 1939 by-election, spent one day in Parliament before dissolution, was re-elected two months later in the 1940 general election with the support of both the Co-operative Commonwealth Federation and the Tory National Government party, but died of complications from a heart attack, a few days after his victory. He was not able to travel from Ottawa to his riding to campaign.

Agnes MacPhail, who introduced Brown to the floor of the House of Commons on 25 January 1940, was eventually recruited by the URM to succeed him, but she was defeated in the subsequent by-election later that year.

== Later Presbyterian career ==
Brown left Red Deer later that year to oversee the re-organization of some Presbyterians in Saskatoon, Saskatchewan that had voted against joining the United Church. St. Andrew's Presbyterian Church, Saskatoon was formed under his pastoral leadership, and remains the largest PCC congregation within the province.

In June 1931, he was elected Moderator of the Presbyterian General Assembly, and during his Moderatorial year, travelled to Asia, and visited Korea, Japan, Taiwan, and the Manchuria portion of China.

Reverend Walter George Brown is one of the few Moderators of the Presbyterian Church who was or is not a Reverend Doctor; he refused to accept Honorary Doctorates from his alma mater, nor Toronto's Knox College. He died on April 1, 1940, out of heart attack while in office and the funeral took place in Ottawa, and is buried at the Athelstan Presbyterian Cemetery.
