= Roy Knight (politician) =

Canadian politician

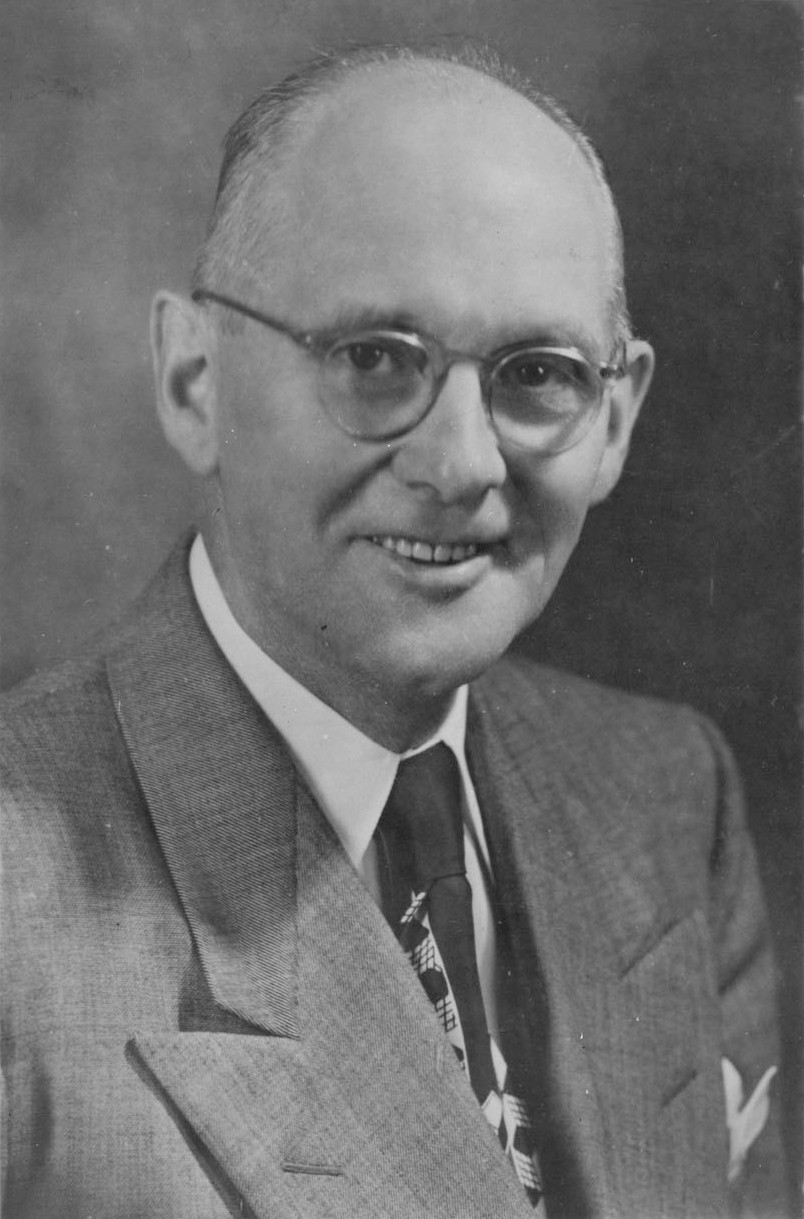

Member of Parliament for Saskatoon City
- In office June 1945 – June 1949
- Preceded by: Alfred Henry Bence
- Succeeded by: riding dissolved

Member of Parliament for Saskatoon
- In office June 1949 – June 1957
- Preceded by: riding re-established
- Succeeded by: Henry Frank Jones

Personal details
- Born: Robert Ross (Roy) Knight; 12 December 1891 Cookstown, County Tyrone, Ireland
- Died: 11 September 1971 (aged 79)
- Spouse(s): Ellen Davidson (m. 18 December 1916)
- Profession: farmer, teacher

Robert Ross "Roy" Knight (12 December 1891 – 11 September 1971) was a Co-operative Commonwealth Federation member of the House of Commons of Canada. He was born in Cookstown, County Tyrone, Ireland and became a farmer and teacher by career.

Knight lived in Northern Ireland during his childhood, attending the Royal School Dungannon. He moved to Canada in 1909, attended Saskatoon Normal School, then Queen's University in Kingston, Ontario, where he received his Bachelor of Arts.

He was first elected at the Saskatoon City riding in the 1945 general election, then re-elected at Saskatoon in 1949 and again in 1953. Knight was defeated by Henry Frank Jones of the Progressive Conservative party in the 1957 election. Knight was again unsuccessful there in 1958.
