= Alfred Henry Bence =

Canadian politician

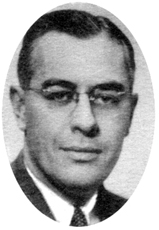

Member of the Canadian Parliament for Saskatoon City
- In office 1940–1945
- Preceded by: Walter George Brown
- Succeeded by: Robert Ross Knight

Personal details
- Born: October 18, 1908 Lanigan, Saskatchewan, Canada
- Died: May 27, 1977 (aged 68) Prince Albert, Saskatchewan, Canada
- Party: Progressive Conservative Party
- Occupation: barrister

Alfred Henry Bence (October 18, 1908 – May 27, 1977) was a Canadian politician and barrister. He was elected to the House of Commons of Canada in 1940 as a Member of the Progressive Conservative Party to represent the riding of Saskatoon City. He was defeated in 1945 and 1949. He was an alderman for Saskatoon between 1939 and 1940.
