= Gordon Drummond Clancy =

Canadian politician

- Official 1966 portrait

Member of Parliament for Yorkton
- In office March 1958 – April 1968

Personal details
- Born: 11 May 1912 Semans, Saskatchewan, Canada
- Died: 16 February 1996 (aged 83) Ottawa, Ontario, Canada
- Party: Progressive Conservative
- Profession: pharmacist

Gordon Drummond Clancy (11 May 1912 – 16 February 1996) was a Progressive Conservative party member of the House of Commons of Canada. He was a pharmacist by career.

He was first elected at the Yorkton riding in the 1958 general election after an unsuccessful attempt to win the riding in 1957. After re-elections at Yorkton in 1962, 1963 and 1965, Clancy left federal politics and did not seek further re-election after completing his term in the 27th Canadian Parliament in 1968.
