= Grey Southeast =

Former federal electoral district in Ontario, Canada

Ontario electoral district

Defunct federal electoral district
- Legislature: House of Commons
- District created: 1914
- District abolished: 1933
- First contested: 1917
- Last contested: 1930

Grey Southeast was a federal electoral district represented in the House of Commons of Canada from 1917 to 1935. It was located in the province of Ontario. This riding was created in 1914 from parts of Grey East and Grey South ridings when the county of Grey was re-divided into two ridings, Grey North and Grey Southeast.

The southeast riding consisted of the towns of Durham and Hanover, and the villages of Markdale, Dundalk, Flesherton and Chatsworth, and the townships of Bentinck, Normandy, Glenelg, Egremont, Proton, Artemesia, Osprey, Holland and Sullivan.

In 1924, it was redefined to consist of the part of the county of Grey lying south of and including the townships of Sullivan, Holland, Artemesia and Osprey.

The electoral district was abolished in 1933 when it was redistributed between Grey North and Grey—Bruce ridings.

It was the first riding in Canada to elect a female Member of Parliament, when it elected Agnes Macphail of the Progressive Party in the 1921 election.

== Members of Parliament ==
This riding has elected the following members of Parliament:

Parliament	Years	Member	Party
Riding created from Grey East and Grey South
13th	1917–1921	Robert James Ball	Government (Unionist)
14th	1921–1925	Agnes Macphail	Progressive
15th	1925–1926	Agnes Macphail	Progressive
16th	1926–1930	Agnes Macphail	Progressive
17th	1930–1935	Agnes Macphail	Progressive
Riding dissolved into Grey North and Grey—Bruce

== Election results ==
1917 Canadian federal election
Party	Candidate	Votes
Government (Unionist)	Robert James Ball	4,845
Opposition (Laurier Liberals)	William Henry Wright	3,609

1921 Canadian federal election
Party	Candidate	Votes
Progressive	Agnes Campbell Macphail	6,958
Conservative	Robert James Ball	4,360
Liberal	Walter Hastie	2,638

1925 Canadian federal election
Party	Candidate	Votes
Progressive	Agnes C. Macphail	6,652
Conservative	Lewis G. Campbell	5,245

1926 Canadian federal election
Party	Candidate	Votes
Progressive	Agnes Campbell Macphail	7,939
Conservative	Robert Thomas Edwards	6,211

1930 Canadian federal election
Party	Candidate	Votes
Progressive	Agnes Campbell Macphail	6,619
Liberal	Lewis G. Campbell	6,376

== See also ==
- List of Canadian electoral districts
- Historical federal electoral districts of Canada
