= Matthew Kendal Richardson =

Canadian politician

Matthew Kendal Richardson (August 14, 1839 – November 5, 1917) was an English-born merchant and political figure in Ontario, Canada. He represented Grey South in the House of Commons of Canada from 1900 to 1904 as a Liberal-Conservative.

He was born in Culgaith, Cumberland, the son of Joseph Richardson and Ann Eggleston, and was educated in England. Richardson married Mary McFarland. He served eight years on the council for Grey County, also serving as county warden.
