= By-elections to the 22nd Canadian Parliament =

By-elections to the 22nd Canadian Parliament were held to fill vacancies in the House of Commons of Canada between the 1953 federal election and the 1957 federal election. The Liberal Party of Canada led a majority government for the 22nd Canadian Parliament.

Seventeen vacant seats were filled through by-elections.

By-election	Date	Incumbent	Party	Winner	Party	Cause	Retained
Saint-Jean—Iberville—Napierville	December 19, 1955	Alcide Côté	Liberal	J.-Armand Ménard	Liberal	Death	Yes
Spadina	October 24, 1955	David A. Croll	Liberal	Charles E. Rea	Progressive Conservative	Called to the Senate	No
Restigouche—Madawaska	September 26, 1955	Joseph Gaspard Boucher	Liberal	Joseph Charles Van Horne	Progressive Conservative	Death	No
Bellechasse	September 26, 1955	L.-Philippe Picard	Liberal	Ovide Laflamme	Liberal	Resignation	Yes
Quebec South	September 26, 1955	Charles G. Power	Liberal	Frank G. Power	Liberal	Called to the Senate	Yes
Témiscouata	September 26, 1955	Jean-François Pouliot	Liberal	Jean-Paul St-Laurent	Liberal	Called to the Senate	Yes
Battle River—Camrose	June 20, 1955	Robert Fair	Social Credit	James A. Smith	Social Credit	Death	Yes
Selkirk	November 8, 1954	Robert James Wood	Liberal	Scottie Bryce	C. C. F.	Death	No
Stormont	November 8, 1954	Lionel Chevrier	Liberal	Albert Peter Lavigne	Liberal	Appointed President of the St. Lawrence Seaway Authority	Yes
Trinity	November 8, 1954	Lionel Conacher	Liberal	Donald D. Carrick	Liberal	Death	Yes
York West	November 8, 1954	Agar Rodney Adamson	Progressive Conservative	John B. Hamilton	Progressive Conservative	Death	Yes
Saint-Antoine—Westmount	November 8, 1954	Douglas Charles Abbott	Liberal	George C. Marler	Liberal	Appointed a Justice of the Supreme Court of Canada	Yes
St. Lawrence—St. George	November 8, 1954	Brooke Claxton	Liberal	Claude Richardson	Liberal	Resignation	Yes
Elgin	March 22, 1954	Charles Delmer Coyle	Progressive Conservative	James A. McBain	Progressive Conservative	Death	Yes
Peel	March 22, 1954	Gordon Graydon	Progressive Conservative	John Pallett	Progressive Conservative	Death	Yes
Gatineau	March 22, 1954	Joseph-Célestin Nadon	Liberal	Rodolphe Leduc	Liberal	Death	Yes
Verdun	March 22, 1954	Paul-Émile Côté	Liberal	Yves Leduc	Liberal	Appointed a Superior Court Judge of Quebec	Yes

== See also ==
- List of federal by-elections in Canada

== Sources ==
- Parliament of Canada–Elected in By-Elections
