= 22nd Canadian Parliament =

1953–57 legislative term

- Majority parliament
- Nov. 12, 1953 – Apr. 12, 1957

Parliament leaders
- Prime minister: Louis St. Laurent; Nov. 15, 1948 – Jun. 21, 1957
- Cabinet: 17th Canadian Ministry
- Leader of the Opposition: George A. Drew; October 2, 1948 – November 1, 1954
- William Earl Rowe; November 1, 1954 – February 1, 1955
- George A. Drew; February 1, 1955 – August 1, 1956
- William Earl Rowe; August 1, 1956 – December 14, 1956
- John Diefenbaker; December 14, 1956 – June 21, 1957

Party caucuses
- Government: Liberal Party
- Opposition: Progressive Conservative Party
- Crossbench: Co-operative Commonwealth Federation
- Social Credit Party
- Liberal-Labour
- Liberal-Progressive

House of Commons
- Seating arrangements of the House of Commons
- Speaker of the Commons: Louis-René Beaudoin; November 12, 1953 – October 13, 1957
- Government House leader: Walter Edward Harris; May 9, 1953 – April 12, 1957
- Members: 265 MP seats List of members

Senate
- Speaker of the Senate: Wishart McLea Robertson; October 14, 1953 – October 3, 1957
- Government Senate leader: William Ross Macdonald; October 14, 1953 – June 21, 1957
- Opposition Senate leader: John Thomas Haig; September 12, 1945 – June 20, 1957
- Senators: 102 senator seats List of senators

Sovereign
- Monarch: Elizabeth II; February 6, 1952 – September 8, 2022
- Governor general: Vincent Massey; 28 February 1952 – 15 September 1959

Sessions
- 1st session November 12, 1953 – November 20, 1954
- 2nd session January 7, 1955 – July 28, 1955
- 3rd session January 10, 1956 – August 14, 1956
- 4th session November 26, 1956 – January 8, 1957
- 5th session January 8, 1957 – April 12, 1957
← 21st	→ 23rd

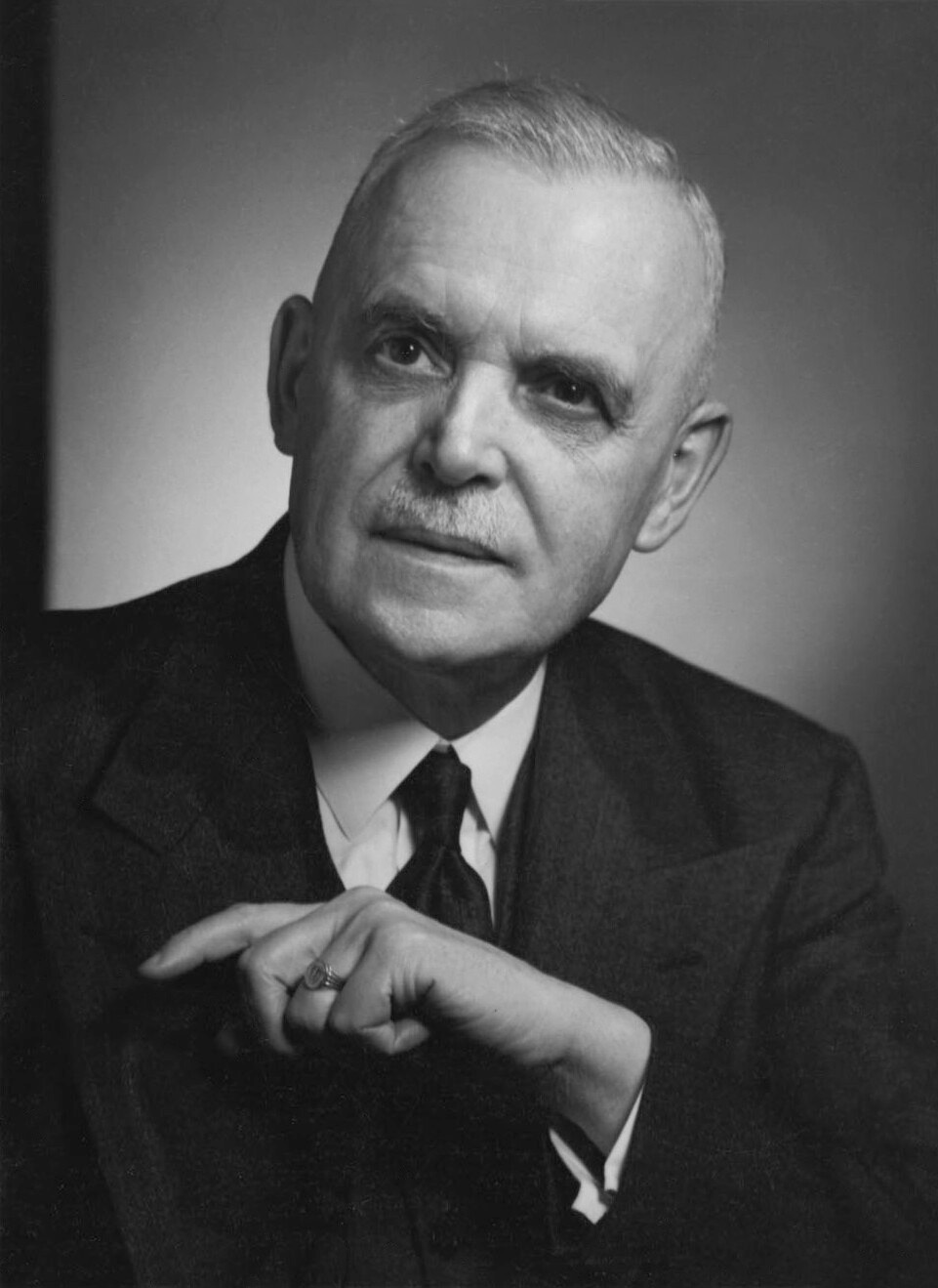
Louis St. Laurent was Prime Minister during the 22nd Canadian Parliament.

The 22nd Canadian Parliament was in session from November 12, 1953, until April 12, 1957. The membership was set by the 1953 federal election on August 10, 1953, and it changed only somewhat due to resignations and by-elections until it was dissolved prior to the 1957 election.

There were five sessions of the 22nd Parliament:

Session	Start	End
1st	November 12, 1953	November 20, 1954
2nd	January 7, 1955	July 28, 1955
3rd	January 10, 1956	August 14, 1956
4th (Special)	November 26, 1956	January 8, 1957
5th	January 8, 1957	April 12, 1957

== Overview ==
It was controlled by a Liberal Party majority under Prime Minister Louis St. Laurent and the 17th Canadian Ministry. The Official Opposition was the Progressive Conservative Party, led first by George Drew, and then by William Earl Rowe, George Drew (again), William Earl Rowe, and John Diefenbaker consecutively.

== Party Standings ==
Number of members per party	Party leader	General Election
Number of members per party	Party leader	August 10, 1953
Liberal	Louis St. Laurent	169
Progressive Conservative	George Drew	51
Co-operative Commonwealth	M.J. Coldwell	23
Social Credit	Solon Low	15
Liberal-Labour		1
Liberal-Progressive		1
Independent		3
Independent Liberal		2
Total Seats		265

== Ministry ==
Main article: 17th Canadian Ministry

The 17th Canadian Ministry began at the end of the 20th Canadian Parliament and lasted until near the end of the 22nd Canadian Parliament.

== Officeholders ==
=== Head of State ===
Office	Photo	Name	Assumed office	Left office
Sovereign		Elizabeth II	February 6, 1952	September 8, 2022
Governor General		Vincent Massey	February 28, 1952	September 15, 1959

=== Party leadership ===
Party	Photo	Name	Assumed office	Left office
Liberal		Louis St. Laurent	August 7, 1948	January 16, 1958
Progressive Conservative		George Drew	October 2, 1948	November 1, 1954
Progressive Conservative		William Earl Rowe (Interim)	November 1, 1954	February 1, 1955
Progressive Conservative		George Drew	February 1, 1955	August 1, 1956
Progressive Conservative		William Earl Rowe (Interim)	August 1, 1956	December 14, 1956
Progressive Conservative		John Diefenbaker	December 14, 1956	September 8, 1967
Social Credit		Solon Earl Low	April 6, 1944	March 9, 1967
CCF		M.J. Coldwell	July 29, 1942	August 10, 1960

== Changes to party standings ==
=== By-elections ===
By-election	Date	Incumbent	Party	Winner	Party	Cause	Retained
Saint-Jean—Iberville—Napierville	December 19, 1955	Alcide Côté	Liberal	J.-Armand Ménard	Liberal	Death	Yes
Spadina	October 24, 1955	David A. Croll	Liberal	Charles E. Rea	Progressive Conservative	Called to the Senate	No
Restigouche—Madawaska	September 26, 1955	Joseph Gaspard Boucher	Liberal	Joseph Charles Van Horne	Progressive Conservative	Death	No
Bellechasse	September 26, 1955	L.-Philippe Picard	Liberal	Ovide Laflamme	Liberal	Resignation	Yes
Quebec South	September 26, 1955	Charles G. Power	Liberal	Frank G. Power	Liberal	Called to the Senate	Yes
Témiscouata	September 26, 1955	Jean-François Pouliot	Liberal	Jean-Paul St-Laurent	Liberal	Called to the Senate	Yes
Battle River—Camrose	June 20, 1955	Robert Fair	Social Credit	James A. Smith	Social Credit	Death	Yes
Selkirk	November 8, 1954	Robert James Wood	Liberal	Scottie Bryce	C. C. F.	Death	No
Stormont	November 8, 1954	Lionel Chevrier	Liberal	Albert Peter Lavigne	Liberal	Appointed President of the St. Lawrence Seaway Authority	Yes
Trinity	November 8, 1954	Lionel Conacher	Liberal	Donald D. Carrick	Liberal	Death	Yes
York West	November 8, 1954	Agar Rodney Adamson	Progressive Conservative	John B. Hamilton	Progressive Conservative	Death	Yes
Saint-Antoine—Westmount	November 8, 1954	Douglas Charles Abbott	Liberal	George C. Marler	Liberal	Appointed a Justice of the Supreme Court of Canada	Yes
St. Lawrence—St. George	November 8, 1954	Brooke Claxton	Liberal	Claude Richardson	Liberal	Resignation	Yes
Elgin	March 22, 1954	Charles Delmer Coyle	Progressive Conservative	James A. McBain	Progressive Conservative	Death	Yes
Peel	March 22, 1954	Gordon Graydon	Progressive Conservative	John Pallett	Progressive Conservative	Death	Yes
Gatineau	March 22, 1954	Joseph-Célestin Nadon	Liberal	Rodolphe Leduc	Liberal	Death	Yes
Verdun	March 22, 1954	Paul-Émile Côté	Liberal	Yves Leduc	Liberal	Appointed a Superior Court Judge of Quebec	Yes

== List of members ==
Following is a full list of members of the twenty-second Parliament listed first by province, then by electoral district.

Key:

- Party leaders are italicized.
- Parliamentary assistants is indicated by "‡".
- Cabinet ministers are in **boldface**.
- The Prime Minister is **both**.
- The Speaker is indicated by "(†)".

Electoral districts denoted by an asterisk (*) indicates that district was represented by two members.

=== Alberta ===
Electoral district	Name	Party	First elected/previously elected	No. of terms
Acadia	Victor Quelch	Social Credit	1935	5th term
Athabaska	Joseph Miville Dechene	Liberal	1940	4th term
Battle River—Camrose	Robert Fair (died 11 November 1954)	Social Credit	1935	5th term
Battle River—Camrose	James Alexander Smith (by-election of 1955-06-20)	Social Credit	1955	1st term
Bow River	Charles Edward Johnston	Social Credit	1935	5th term
Calgary North	Douglas Harkness	Progressive Conservative	1945	3rd term
Calgary South	Carl Nickle	Progressive Conservative	1951	2nd term
Edmonton East	Ambrose Holowach	Social Credit	1953	1st term
Edmonton—Strathcona	Richmond Francis Hanna	Liberal	1953	1st term
Edmonton West	**George Prudham**	Liberal	1949	2nd term
Jasper—Edson	Charles Yuill	Social Credit	1953	1st term
Lethbridge	John Horne Blackmore	Social Credit	1935	5th term
Macleod	Ernest George Hansell	Social Credit	1935	5th term
Medicine Hat	William Duncan Wylie	Social Credit	1945	3rd term
Peace River	Solon Earl Low	Social Credit	1945	3rd term
Red Deer	Frederick Davis Shaw	Social Credit	1940	4th term
Vegreville	John Decore	Liberal	1949	2nd term
Wetaskiwin	Ray Thomas	Social Credit	1949	2nd term

=== British Columbia ===
Electoral district	Name	Party	First elected/previously elected	No. of terms
Burnaby—Coquitlam	Erhart Regier	C.C.F.	1953	1st term
Burnaby—Richmond	Tom Goode	Liberal	1949	2nd term
Cariboo	Bert Leboe	Social Credit	1953	1st term
Coast—Capilano	**James Sinclair**	Liberal	1940	4th term
Comox—Alberni	Thomas Speakman Barnett	C.C.F.	1953	1st term
Esquimalt—Saanich	George Pearkes	Progressive Conservative	1945	3rd term
Fraser Valley	Alexander Bell Patterson	Social Credit	1953	1st term
Kamloops	Davie Fulton	Progressive Conservative	1945	3rd term
Kootenay East	James Allen Byrne	Liberal	1949	2nd term
Kootenay West	Herbert Wilfred Herridge	C.C.F.	1945	3rd term
Nanaimo	Colin Cameron	C.C.F.	1953	1st term
New Westminster	George Hahn	Social Credit	1953	1st term
Okanagan Boundary	Owen Jones	C.C.F.	1948	3rd term
Okanagan—Revelstoke	George McLeod	Social Credit	1953	1st term
Skeena	Edward Applewhaite	Liberal	1949	2nd term
Vancouver—Burrard	Lorne MacDougall	Liberal	1949	2nd term
Vancouver—Burrard	Lorne MacDougall died on June 6, 1956	Vacant		
Vancouver Centre	**Ralph Campney**	Liberal	1949	2nd term
Vancouver East	Harold Winch	C.C.F.	1953	1st term
Vancouver Kingsway	Angus MacInnis	C.C.F.	1930	6th term
Vancouver Quadra	Howard Charles Green	Progressive Conservative	1935	5th term
Vancouver South	Elmore Philpott	Liberal	1953	1st term
Victoria	Francis Fairey	Liberal	1953	1st term

=== Manitoba ===
Electoral district	Name	Party	First elected/previously elected	No. of terms
Brandon—Souris	Walter Dinsdale	Progressive Conservative	1951	2nd term
Churchill	George Weaver	Liberal	1949	2nd term
Dauphin	Fred Zaplitny	C.C.F.	1945, 1953	2nd term*
Lisgar	William Albert Pommer	Liberal	1953	1st term
Marquette	**Stuart Garson**	Liberal	1948	3rd term
Portage—Neepawa	William Gilbert Weir ‡	Liberal-Progressive	1930	6th term
Provencher	René Jutras	Liberal	1940	4th term
Selkirk	Robert James Wood (died 8 August 1954)	Liberal	1949	2nd term
Selkirk	William Bryce (by-election of 1954-11-08)	C.C.F.	1943, 1954	4th term*
Springfield	Anton Weselak	Liberal	1953	1st term
St. Boniface	Fernand Viau	Liberal	1945	3rd term
Winnipeg North	Alistair Stewart	C.C.F.	1945	3rd term
Winnipeg North Centre	Stanley Knowles	C.C.F.	1942	4th term
Winnipeg South	Owen Trainor	Progressive Conservative	1953	1st term
Winnipeg South	Owen Trainor died on November 28, 1956	Vacant		
Winnipeg South Centre	Gordon Churchill	Progressive Conservative	1951	2nd term

=== New Brunswick ===
Electoral district	Name	Party	First elected/previously elected	No. of terms
Charlotte	A. Wesley Stuart	Liberal	1945	3rd term
Gloucester	Hédard Robichaud	Liberal	1953	1st term
Kent	Hervé Michaud	Liberal	1953	1st term
Northumberland	George Roy McWilliam	Liberal	1949	2nd term
Restigouche—Madawaska	Joseph Gaspard Boucher	Liberal	1953	1st term
Restigouche—Madawaska	Charles Van Horne (by-election of 1955-09-26)	Progressive Conservative	1955	1st term
Royal	Alfred Johnson Brooks	Progressive Conservative	1935	5th term
St. John—Albert	Thomas Miller Bell	Progressive Conservative	1953	1st term
Victoria—Carleton	Gage Montgomery	Progressive Conservative	1952	2nd term
Westmorland	Henry Murphy	Liberal	1949	2nd term
York—Sunbury	**Milton Fowler Gregg**	Liberal	1947	3rd term

=== Newfoundland ===
Electoral district	Name	Party	First elected/previously elected	No. of terms
Bonavista—Twillingate	**Jack Pickersgill**	Liberal	1953	1st term
Burin—Burgeo	Chesley William Carter	Liberal	1949	2nd term
Grand Falls—White Bay—Labrador	Thomas G. W. Ashbourne	Liberal	1949	2nd term
Humber—St. George's	Herman Maxwell Batten	Liberal	1953	1st term
St. John's East	Allan Fraser	Liberal	1953	1st term
St. John's West	James Augustine Power	Liberal	1953	1st term
Trinity—Conception	Leonard Stick	Liberal	1949	2nd term

=== Northwest Territories ===
Electoral district	Name	Party	First elected/previously elected	No. of terms
Mackenzie River	Merv Hardie	Liberal	1953	1st term

=== Nova Scotia ===
Electoral district	Name	Party	First elected/previously elected	No. of terms
Antigonish—Guysborough	J. Ralph Kirk	Liberal	1949	2nd term
Cape Breton North and Victoria	William Murdoch Buchanan	Liberal	1953	1st term
Cape Breton South	Clarence Gillis	C.C.F.	1940	4th term
Colchester—Hants	Gordon Purdy	Liberal	1935, 1953	3rd term*
Cumberland	Azel Randolph Lusby	Liberal	1953	1st term
Digby—Annapolis—Kings	George Nowlan	Progressive Conservative	1948, 1950	3rd term*
Halifax*	Samuel Rosborough Balcom	Liberal	1950	2nd term
Halifax*	John Dickey ‡	Liberal	1947	3rd term
Inverness—Richmond	Allan MacEachen	Liberal	1953	1st term
Pictou	Henry Byron McCulloch	Liberal	1935	5th term
Queens—Lunenburg	**Robert Winters**	Liberal	1945	3rd term
Shelburne—Yarmouth—Clare	Thomas Kirk ‡	Liberal	1949	2nd term

=== Ontario ===
Electoral district	Name	Party	First elected/previously elected	No. of terms
Algoma East	**Lester B. Pearson**	Liberal	1948	3rd term
Algoma West	George E. Nixon	Liberal	1940	4th term
Brantford	James Elisha Brown	Liberal	1953	1st term
Brant—Haldimand	John A. Charlton	Progressive Conservative	1945	3rd term
Broadview	George Hees	Progressive Conservative	1950	2nd term
Bruce	Andrew Ernest Robinson	Progressive Conservative	1945, 1953	2nd term*
Carleton	George Drew	Progressive Conservative	1948	3rd term
Cochrane	Joseph-Anaclet Habel	Liberal	1953	1st term
Danforth	Robert Hardy Small	Progressive Conservative	1953	1st term
Davenport	Paul Hellyer ‡	Liberal	1949	2nd term
Dufferin—Simcoe	William Earl Rowe	Progressive Conservative	1925	8th term
Durham	John James	Liberal	1949	2nd term
Eglinton	Donald Fleming	Progressive Conservative	1945	3rd term
Elgin	Charles Delmer Coyle (died 19 January 1954)	Progressive Conservative	1945	3rd term
Elgin	James Alexander McBain (by-election of 22 March 1954)	Progressive Conservative	1954	1st term
Essex East	**Paul Martin Sr.**	Liberal	1935	5th term
Essex South	Murray Clark	Liberal	1935	5th term
Essex West	Donald Ferguson Brown	Liberal	1945	3rd term
Fort William	Dan McIvor	Liberal	1935	5th term
Glengarry—Prescott	Raymond Bruneau	Liberal	1949	2nd term
Greenwood	James Macdonnell	Progressive Conservative	1945, (Note: Muskoka—Ontario) 1949	3rd term*
Grenville—Dundas	Arza Clair Casselman	Progressive Conservative	1921, 1925	9th term*
Grey—Bruce	**Walter Harris**	Liberal	1940	4th term
Grey North	Colin Emerson Bennett ‡	Liberal	1949	2nd term
Halton	Sybil Bennett	Progressive Conservative	1953	1st term
Halton	Sybil Bennett died on November 12, 1956	Vacant		
Hamilton East	Thomas Hambly Ross	Liberal	1940	4th term
Hamilton East	Thomas Hambly Ross died on November 20, 1956	Vacant		
Hamilton South	Russell Reinke	Liberal	1953	1st term
Hamilton West	Ellen Fairclough	Progressive Conservative	1950	2nd term
Hastings—Frontenac	George Stanley White	Progressive Conservative	1940	4th term
Hastings South	Frank Follwell	Liberal	1949	2nd term
High Park	Pat Cameron	Liberal	1949	2nd term
Huron	Elston Cardiff	Progressive Conservative	1940	4th term
Kenora—Rainy River	William Moore Benidickson ‡	Liberal-Labour	1945	3rd term
Kent	Blake Huffman	Liberal	1949	2nd term
Kingston	William Henderson	Liberal	1949	2nd term
Lambton—Kent	Hugh MacKenzie	Liberal	1935, 1949	4th term*
Lambton West	Joseph Warner Murphy	Progressive Conservative	1945	3rd term
Lanark	William Gourlay Blair	Progressive Conservative	1945	3rd term
Leeds	Hayden Stanton	Progressive Conservative	1953	1st term
Lincoln	Harry Cavers	Liberal	1949	2nd term
London	Robert Weld Mitchell	Progressive Conservative	1953	1st term
Middlesex East	Harry Oliver White	Progressive Conservative	1945	3rd term
Middlesex West	Robert McCubbin ‡	Liberal	1940	4th term
Niagara Falls	William Houck	Liberal	1953	1st term
Nickel Belt	Léo Gauthier	Liberal	1945	3rd term
Nipissing	Jack Garland	Liberal	1949	2nd term
Norfolk	Raymond Elmer Anderson	Liberal	1949	2nd term
Northumberland	Frederick Robertson ‡	Liberal	1949	2nd term
Ontario	Michael Starr	Progressive Conservative	1952	2nd term
Ottawa East	Jean-Thomas Richard	Liberal	1945	3rd term
Ottawa West	George McIlraith	Liberal	1940	4th term
Oxford	Wally Nesbitt	Progressive Conservative	1953	1st term
Parkdale	John Hunter	Liberal	1949	2nd term
Parry Sound-Muskoka	Wilfred McDonald	Liberal	1945	3rd term
Peel	Gordon Graydon (died in office)	Progressive Conservative	1935	5th term
Peel	John Pallett (by-election of 22 March 1954)	Progressive Conservative	1954	1st term
Perth	J. Waldo Monteith	Progressive Conservative	1953	1st term
Peterborough	Gordon Fraser	Progressive Conservative	1940	4th term
Port Arthur	**Clarence Decatur Howe**	Liberal	1935	5th term
Prince Edward—Lennox	George Tustin	Progressive Conservative	1935	5th term
Renfrew North	James Forgie	Liberal	1953	1st term
Renfrew South	**James Joseph McCann**	Liberal	1935	5th term
Rosedale	Charles Henry	Liberal	1949	2nd term
Russell	Joseph-Omer Gour	Liberal	1945	3rd term
St. Paul's	Roland Michener	Progressive Conservative	1953	1st term
Simcoe East	William Alfred Robinson	Liberal	1940	4th term
Simcoe North	Julian Ferguson	Progressive Conservative	1940	4th term
Spadina	David Croll (until Senate appointment)	Liberal	1945	3rd term
Spadina	Charles Edward Rea (by-election of 24 October 1955)	Progressive Conservative	1955	1st term
Stormont	**Lionel Chevrier** (until Saint Lawrence Seaway appointment)	Liberal	1935	5th term
Stormont	Albert Lavigne (by-election of 8 November 1954)	Liberal	1954	1st term
Sudbury	Rodger Mitchell	Liberal	1953	1st term
Timiskaming	Ann Shipley	Liberal	1953	1st term
Timmins	Karl Eyre	Liberal	1949	2nd term
Trinity	Lionel Conacher (died in office)	Liberal	1949	2nd term
Trinity	Donald Carrick (by-election of 8 November 1954)	Liberal	1954	1st term
Victoria	Clayton Hodgson	Progressive Conservative	1945	3rd term
Waterloo North	Norman Schneider	Liberal	1952	2nd term
Waterloo South	Arthur White	Liberal	1953	1st term
Welland	William Hector McMillan	Liberal	1950	2nd term
Wellington—Huron	Marvin Howe	Progressive Conservative	1953	1st term
Wellington South	Henry Alfred Hosking	Liberal	1949	2nd term
Wentworth	Frank Lennard	Progressive Conservative	1935, 1945	4th term*
York Centre	Al Hollingworth	Liberal	1953	1st term
York East	Robert Henry McGregor	Progressive Conservative	1926	7th term
York—Humber	Margaret Aitken	Progressive Conservative	1953	1st term
York North	Jack Smith	Liberal	1945	3rd term
York—Scarborough	Frank Enfield	Liberal	1953	1st term
York South	Joseph W. Noseworthy	C.C.F.	1942, 1949	3rd term*
York South	Joseph W. Noseworthy died on March 30, 1956	Vacant		
York West	Agar Rodney Adamson	Progressive Conservative	1940	4th term
York West	John Borden Hamilton (by-election of 8 November 1954)	Progressive Conservative	1954	1st term

=== Prince Edward Island ===
Electoral district	Name	Party	First elected/previously elected	No. of terms
King's	Thomas Joseph Kickham	Liberal	1949	2nd term
Prince	John Watson MacNaught ‡	Liberal	1945	3rd term
Queen's*	Angus MacLean	Progressive Conservative	1951	2nd term
Queen's*	Neil Matheson	Liberal	1953	1st term

=== Quebec ===
Electoral district	Name	Party	First elected/previously elected	No. of terms
Argenteuil—Deux-Montagnes	Philippe Valois	Liberal	1949	2nd term
Beauce	Raoul Poulin	Independent	1949	2nd term
Beauharnois—Salaberry	Robert Cauchon	Liberal	1949	2nd term
Bellechasse	Louis-Philippe Picard (until resignation)	Liberal	1940	4th term
Bellechasse	Ovide Laflamme (by-election of 26 September 1955)	Liberal	1955	1st term
Berthier—Maskinongé—Delanaudière	Joseph Langlois	Liberal	1949	2nd term
Bonaventure	Bona Arsenault	Liberal	1945	3rd term
Brome—Missisquoi	Joseph-Léon Deslières	Liberal	1952	2nd term
Cartier	Leon Crestohl	Liberal	1950	2nd term
Chambly—Rouville	**Roch Pinard** ‡	Liberal	1945	3rd term
Champlain	Joseph Irenée Rochefort	Liberal	1949	2nd term
Chapleau	David Gourd	Liberal	1945	3rd term
Charlevoix	Auguste Maltais	Liberal	1949	2nd term
Châteauguay—Huntingdon—Laprairie	Jean Boucher	Liberal	1953	1st term
Chicoutimi	Paul-Edmond Gagnon	Independent	1945	3rd term
Compton—Frontenac	Joseph-Adéodat Blanchette ‡	Liberal	1935	5th term
Dollard	Guy Rouleau	Liberal	1953	1st term
Dorchester	Robert Perron	Progressive Conservative	1953	1st term
Drummond—Arthabaska	Armand Cloutier	Liberal	1940	4th term
Gaspé	Léopold Langlois ‡	Liberal	1945	3rd term
Gatineau	Joseph-Célestin Nadon (died 17 December 1953)	Liberal	1949	2nd term
Gatineau	Rodolphe Leduc (by-election of 22 March 1954)	Liberal	1936, 1954	3rd term*
Hochelaga	Raymond Eudes	Liberal	1940	4th term
Hull	Alexis Caron	Liberal	1953	1st term
Îles-de-la-Madeleine	Charles Cannon	Liberal	1949	2nd term
Jacques-Cartier—Lasalle	Edgar Leduc	Liberal	1949	2nd term
Joliette—l'Assomption—Montcalm	Maurice Breton	Liberal	1950	2nd term
Kamouraska	Arthur Massé	Independent Liberal	1949	2nd term
Labelle	Gustave Roy	Liberal	1953	1st term
Lac-Saint-Jean	André Gauthier	Liberal	1949	2nd term
Lafontaine	J.-Georges Ratelle	Liberal	1949	2nd term
Lapointe	Fernand Girard	Independent	1953	1st term
Laurier	J.-Eugène Lefrançois	Liberal	1949	2nd term
Laval	Léopold Demers	Liberal	1948	3rd term
Lévis	Maurice Bourget ‡	Liberal	1940	4th term
Longueuil	Auguste Vincent	Liberal	1953	1st term
Lotbinière	**Hugues Lapointe**	Liberal	1940	4th term
Maisonneuve—Rosemont	Jean-Paul Deschatelets	Liberal	1953	1st term
Matapédia—Matane	Léandre Thibault	Liberal	1953	1st term
Mégantic	Joseph Lafontaine	Liberal	1940	4th term
Mercier	Marcel Monette	Liberal	1949	2nd term
Montmagny—L'Islet	**Jean Lesage**	Liberal	1945	3rd term
Mount Royal	Alan Macnaughton	Liberal	1949	2nd term
Nicolet—Yamaska	Maurice Boisvert	Liberal	1949	2nd term
Notre-Dame-de-Grâce	William McLean Hamilton	Progressive Conservative	1953	1st term
Outremont—St-Jean	Romuald Bourque	Liberal	1952	2nd term
Papineau	Adrien Meunier	Independent Liberal	1953	1st term
Pontiac—Témiscamingue	Hugh Proudfoot	Liberal	1949	2nd term
Portneuf	Pierre Gauthier	Liberal	1936	5th term
Québec—Montmorency	Wilfrid Lacroix	Liberal	1935	5th term
Quebec East	**Louis St. Laurent**	Liberal	1942	4th term
Quebec South	Charles Gavan Power (until 28 July 1955 Senate appointment)	Liberal	1917	10th term
Quebec South	Francis (Frank) Gavan Power (by-election of 26 September 1955)	Liberal	1955	1st term
Quebec West	J.-Wilfrid Dufresne	Progressive Conservative	1953	1st term
Richelieu—Verchères	Lucien Cardin ‡	Liberal	1952	2nd term
Richmond—Wolfe	Ernest-Omer Gingras	Liberal	1949	2nd term
Rimouski	Gérard Légaré	Liberal	1953	1st term
Roberval	Georges Villeneuve	Liberal	1953	1st term
Saguenay	Lomer Brisson	Liberal	1949	2nd term
St. Ann	Thomas Healy	Liberal	1940	4th term
Saint-Antoine—Westmount	**Douglas Abbott** (until 1 July 1954 emoulment appointment)	Liberal	1940	4th term
Saint-Antoine—Westmount	**George Carlyle Marler** (by-election of 8 November 1954)	Liberal	1954	1st term
Saint-Denis	Azellus Denis	Liberal	1935	5th term
Saint-Henri	Joseph-Arsène Bonnier	Liberal	1938	5th term
Saint-Hyacinthe—Bagot	Joseph Fontaine	Liberal	1945	3rd term
Saint-Jacques	Roland Beaudry	Liberal	1945	3rd term
Saint-Jean—Iberville—Napierville	**Alcide Côté** (died 7 August 1955)	Liberal	1945	3rd term
Saint-Jean—Iberville—Napierville	J.-Armand Ménard (by-election of 19 December 1955)	Liberal	1955	1st term
St. Lawrence—St. George	Brooke Claxton (resigned 31 July 1954)	Liberal	1940	4th term
St. Lawrence—St. George	Claude Richardson (by-election of 8 November 1954)	Liberal	1954	1st term
Sainte-Marie	Hector Dupuis	Liberal	1953	1st term
Saint-Maurice—Laflèche	Joseph-Adolphe Richard	Liberal	1949	2nd term
Shefford	Marcel Boivin	Liberal	1945	3rd term
Sherbrooke	Maurice Gingues	Liberal	1940	4th term
Stanstead	Louis-Édouard Roberge	Liberal	1949	2nd term
Témiscouata	Jean-François Pouliot (until 28 July 1955 Senate appointment)	Liberal	1924	9th term
Témiscouata	Jean-Paul St. Laurent (by-election of 26 September 1955)	Liberal	1955	1st term
Terrebonne	Lionel Bertrand	Liberal	1940	4th term
Trois-Rivières	Léon Balcer	Progressive Conservative	1949	2nd term
Vaudreuil—Soulanges	Louis-René Beaudoin (†)	Liberal	1945	3rd term
Verdun	Paul-Émile Côté ‡ (until 1 January 1954 emoulment appointment)	Liberal	1940	4th term
Verdun	Yves Leduc (by-election of 22 March 1954)	Liberal	1954	1st term
Villeneuve	Armand Dumas	Liberal	1949	2nd term

=== Saskatchewan ===
Electoral district	Name	Party	First elected/previously elected	No. of terms
Assiniboia	Hazen Argue	C.C.F.	1945	3rd term
Humboldt—Melfort	Hugh Alexander Bryson	C.C.F.	1953	1st term
Kindersley	Merv Johnson	C.C.F.	1953	1st term
Mackenzie	Alexander Malcolm Nicholson	C.C.F.	1940, 1953	3rd term*
Meadow Lake	John Harrison	Liberal	1949	2nd term
Melville	**James Garfield Gardiner**	Liberal	1936	5th term
Moose Jaw—Lake Centre	Ross Thatcher	C.C.F.	1945	3rd term
Moose Jaw—Lake Centre	Ross Thatcher	Independent	1945	3rd term
Moose Mountain	Edward McCullough	C.C.F.	1945, (Note: Assiniboia) 1953	2nd term*
Prince Albert	John Diefenbaker	Progressive Conservative	1940	4th term
Qu'Appelle	Henry Mang	Liberal	1953	1st term
Regina City	Claude Ellis	C.C.F.	1953	1st term
Rosetown—Biggar	Major James Coldwell	C.C.F.	1935	5th term
Rosthern	Walter Tucker	Liberal	1935, 1953	4th term*
Saskatoon	Roy Knight	C.C.F.	1945	3rd term
Swift Current—Maple Creek	Irvin Studer	Liberal	1949	2nd term
The Battlefords	Max Campbell	C.C.F.	1945, 1953	2nd term*
Yorkton	George Hugh Castleden	C.C.F.	1940, 1953	3rd term*

=== Yukon ===
Electoral district	Name	Party	First elected/previously elected	No. of terms
Yukon	James Aubrey Simmons	Liberal	1949	2nd term

== Legislation and motions ==
=== Act's which received royal assent under 22nd Parliament ===
==== 1st Session ====
===== Public acts =====
Date of Assent	Index	Title	Bill Number
December 16, 1953	1	Auditors for National Railways, An Act Respecting the Appointment of	9
December 16, 1953	2	Children of War Dead (Education Assistance) Act, An Act to Amend the	27
December 16, 1953	3	Customs Act, An Act to Amend the	29
December 16, 1953	4	Department of Northern Affairs and National Resources Act	6
December 16, 1953	5	Election Material for By-elections and Northwest Territories Elections, An Act Respecting the Use of	5
December 16, 1953	6	National Parks Act, An Act to Amend the	28
December 16, 1953	7	Pipe Lines Act, An Act to Amend the	10
February 16, 1954	8	Northwest Territories, An Act to Amend the Acts Respecting the	77
February 16, 1954	9	Ontario-Manitoba Boundary Act, 1953	B
February 16, 1954	10	Senate and House of Commons Act, An Act to Amend the	171
February 16, 1954	11	United Kingdom Financial Agreement Act, 1953	78
March 4, 1954	12	Animal Contagious Diseases Act, An Act to Amend the	250
March 4, 1954	13	Canadian Forces Act, 1954	80
March 4, 1954	14	Explosives Act, An Act to Amend the	C
March 4, 1954	15	Export Credits Insurance Act, An Act to Amend the	295
March 4, 1954	16	Members of Parliament Retiring Allowances Act, An Act to Amend the	176
March 4, 1954	17	National Battlefields at Quebec, An Act to Amend an Act Respecting the	167
March 4, 1954	18	Northwest Atlantic Fisheries Convention Act	251
March 4, 1954	19	Patent Act, An Act to Amend the	177
March 4, 1954	20	Post Office Act, An Act to Amend the	168
March 4, 1954	21	Salaries Act, An Act to Amend the	172
March 4, 1954	22	Telegraphs Act, An Act to Amend the	S
March 18, 1954	23	National Housing Act, 1954	102
March 31, 1954	24	Appropriation Act No. 1, 1954 (Interim)	391
March 31, 1954	25	Appropriation Act No. 2, 1954 (Further Supplementary)	392
March 31, 1954	26	Emergency Gold Mining Assistance Act, An Act to Amend the	376
March 31, 1954	27	Export and Import Permits Act	374
March 31, 1954	28	Fire Losses Replacement Account Act	377
May 27, 1954	29	Appropriation Act No. 3, 1954 (Interim)	465
May 27, 1954	30	Department of Transport Act, An Act to Amend the	443
May 27, 1954	31	Radio Act, An Act to Amend the	446
May 27, 1954	32	Representation Act, An Act to Amend the	420
June 10, 1954	33	Bank of Canada Act, An Act to Amend the	297
June 10, 1954	34	Canadian Citizenship Act, An Act to Amend the	C-15
June 10, 1954	35	Excise Act, An Act to Amend the	448
June 10, 1954	36	International Rapids Power Development Act, An Act to Amend the	B-15
June 10, 1954	37	Navigable Waters Protection Act, An Act to Amend the	O-15
June 10, 1954	38	Opium and Narcotic Drug Act, An Act to Amend the	K-13
June 10, 1954	39	Post Office Act, An Act to Amend the	P-15
June 10, 1954	40	Public Servants Inventions Act	444
June 10, 1954	41	Quebec Savings Banks Act	419
June 10, 1954	42	Research Council Act, An Act to Amend the	375
June 10, 1954	43	Royal Canadian Mounted Police Act, An Act to Amend the	464
June 10, 1954	44	Superannuation of Government Employees Transferred to Crown Corporations, An Act to Amend Certain Acts Respecting the	461
June 10, 1954	45	Vocational Training Co-ordination Act, An Act to Amend the	326
June 10, 1954	46	War Service Grants Act, An Act to Amend the	82
June 26, 1954	47	Atomic Energy Control Act, An Act to Amend the	393
June 26, 1954	48	Bank Act	338
June 26, 1954	49	Canadian National Railway Company from St. Felicien to Chibougamau and from Chibougamau to Beattyville, and from Hillsport to Manitouwadge Lake, An Act Respecting the Construction of Lines of Railway by	442
June 26, 1954	50	Canadian National Railways Financing and Guarantee Act, 1954	469
June 26, 1954	51	Criminal Code	7
June 26, 1954	52	Criminal Code (Race Meetings), An Act to Amend the	Q-15
June 26, 1954	53	Customs Tariff, An Act to Amend the	468
June 26, 1954	54	Diplomatic Immunities (Commonwealth Countries) Act	373
June 26, 1954	55	Disabled Persons Act	462
June 26, 1954	56	Excise Tax Act, An Act to Amend the	447
June 26, 1954	57	Income Tax Act, An Act to Amend the	467
June 26, 1954	58	Judges Act, An Act to Amend the	478
June 26, 1954	59	Motor Vehicle Transport Act	474
June 26, 1954	60	National Harbours Board Act, An Act to Amend the	I-13
June 26, 1954	61	National Physical Fitness Act, An Act to Repeal the	475
June 26, 1954	62	Pension Act, An Act to Amend the	339
June 26, 1954	63	Pipe Lines Act, An Act to Amend the	477
June 26, 1954	64	Public Service Superannuation Act, An Act to Amend the	463
June 26, 1954	65	Veterans Benefit Act, 1954	101
June 26, 1954	66	Veterans' Land Act, An Act to Amend the	459
June 26, 1954	67	Appropriation Act No. 4, 1954	479

===== Local and Private Acts =====
Date of Assent	Index	Title	Bill Number
March 4, March 31, May 27 and June 26, 1954	68	Canadian Pacific Railway Company, An Act Respecting	R-5
March 4, March 31, May 27 and June 26, 1954	69	Baloise Fire Insurance Company of Canada, An Act to Incorporate	L-13
March 4, March 31, May 27 and June 26, 1954	70	Commerce General Insurance Company (Name Changed from Commerce Mutual Fire Insurance Company), An Act Respecting	S-5
March 4, March 31, May 27 and June 26, 1954	71	Dominion Insurance Corporation (Name Changed from The Dominion Fire Insurance Company), An Act Respecting the	K-10
March 4, March 31, May 27 and June 26, 1954	72	Great Lakes Reinsurance Company, An Act Respecting the	Q-5
March 4, March 31, May 27 and June 26, 1954	73	Associated Canadian Travellers, An Act Respecting the	T-3
March 4, March 31, May 27 and June 26, 1954	74	Brazilian Telephone Company, An Act Respecting	W-8
March 4, March 31, May 27 and June 26, 1954	75	Canadian Nurses' Association, An Act Respecting	F-11
March 4, March 31, May 27 and June 26, 1954	76	Canadian Slovak League, An Act to Incorporate	N-15
March 4, March 31, May 27 and June 26, 1954	77	Eastern Telephone and Telegraph Company, An Act Respecting	J-13
March 4, March 31, May 27 and June 26, 1954	78	Niagara Gas Transmission Limited to Construct, Own and Operate an Extra-Provincial Pipe Line, An Act to Authorize	D-10
March 4, March 31, May 27 and June 26, 1954	79	North American Baptists Inc. (Canada), An Act to Incorporate	G-11
March 4, March 31, May 27 and June 26, 1954	80	Trans-Canada Pipe Lines Limited, An Act Respecting	S-11
March 4, March 31, May 27 and June 26, 1954	81	Victorian Order of Nurses for Canada, An Act Respecting	M-2

==== 2nd Session ====
===== Public acts =====
Date of Assent	Index	Title	Bill Number
January 13, 1955	1	Unemployment Insurance Act, An Act to Amend the	6
March 24, 1955	2	Criminal Code, An Act to Amend the	O-8
March 24, 1955	3	Financial Administration Act, An Act to Amend the	184
March 24, 1955	4	National Harbours Board Act, An Act to Amend the	181
March 24, 1955	5	Representation Act, An Act to Amend the	194
March 24, 1955	6	Winnipeg and St. Boniface Harbour Commissioners Act, An Act to Amend the	D
March 31, 1955	7	Appropriation Act No. 1, 1955	284
March 31, 1955	8	Appropriation Act No. 2, 1955	305
March 31, 1955	9	Canada Grain Act, An Act to Amend the	245
March 31, 1955	10	Canada-Ireland Income Tax Agreement Act, 1955	124
March 31, 1955	11	Canada-Ireland Succession Duty Agreement Act, 1955	125
March 31, 1955	12	Members of Parliament Retiring Allowances Act, An Act to Amend the	183
March 31, 1955	13	War Veterans Allowance Act, 1952, An Act to Amend the	164
May 4, 1955	14	Exportation of Power and Fluids and Importation of Gas Act	4
May 4, 1955	15	Foreign Aircraft Third Party Damage Act	F
May 4, 1955	16	Public Service Superannuation Act, An Act to Amend the	189
May 4, 1955	17	Territorial Lands Act, An Act to Amend the	E
May 26, 1955	18	Appropriation Act No. 3, 1955	413
May 26, 1955	19	Emergency Gold Mining Assistance Act, An Act to Amend the	190
May 26, 1955	20	Historic Sites and Monuments Act, An Act to Amend the	182
May 26, 1955	21	Northwest Territories Act, An Act to Amend the	179
May 26, 1955	22	Precious Metals Marking Act, An Act to Amend the	C
May 26, 1955	23	Yukon Act, An Act to Amend the	180
June 28, 1955	24	Alberta-British Columbia Boundary Act, 1955	C-13
June 28, 1955	25	Appropriation Act No. 4, 1955	509
June 28, 1955	26	Blind Persons Act, An Act to Amend the	350
June 28, 1955	27	Canada Agricultural Products Standards Act	411
June 28, 1955	28	Canadian Forces Act, 1955	257
June 28, 1955	29	Canadian National Railways Act	351
June 28, 1955	30	Canadian National Railways Financing and Guarantee Act, 1955	451
June 28, 1955	31	Canadian National Railways Refunding Act, 1955	450
June 28, 1955	32	Customs Act, An Act to Amend the	410
June 28, 1955	33	Government Employees Compensation Act, An Act to Amend the	188
June 28, 1955	34	Great Lakes Fisheries Convention Act	279
June 28, 1955	35	Library of Parliament Act	B
June 28, 1955	36	Meat Inspection Act	352
June 28, 1955	37	National Parks Act and to Establish a National Park in the province of Newfoundland, An Act to Amend the	261
June 28, 1955	38	New Westminster Harbour Commissioners Loan Act, 1955	187
June 28, 1955	39	Prairie Farm Rehabilitation Act, An Act to Amend the	5
June 28, 1955	40	Prisons and Reformatories Act, An Act to Amend the	B-13
June 28, 1955	41	Railway Act, An Act to Amend the	259
June 28, 1955	42	Toronto Harbour Commissioners, The Toronto Terminals Railway Company, Canadian National Railway Company and Canadian Pacific Railway Company, An Act to Approve an Agreement Between the	262
June 28, 1955	43	Veterans Benefit Act, 1954, An Act to Amend the	278
July 11, 1955	44	Canada Elections Act, An Act to Amend the	415
July 11, 1955	45	Criminal Code (Race Meetings), An Act to Amend the	504
July 11, 1955	46	Fisheries Improvement Loans Act	452
July 11, 1955	47	International River Improvements Act	3
July 11, 1955	48	Judges Act and the Judicature Provisions of the Yukon Act and the Northwest Territories Act, An Act to Amend the	505
July 11, 1955	49	Municipal Grants Act, An Act to Amend the	258
July 11, 1955	50	Unemployment Insurance Act	328
July 28, 1955	51	Customs Tariff, An Act to Amend the	506
July 28, 1955	52	Defence Production Act, An Act to Amend the	256
July 28, 1955	53	Excise Tax Act, An Act to Amend the	419
July 28, 1955	54	Income Tax Act, An Act to Amend the	417
July 28, 1955	55	Income Tax Act, the Railway Act and the Tariff Board Act in Respect of Salaries of Certain Public Officials, An Act to Amend the	56
July 28, 1955	56	Prairie Farm Assistance Act, An Act to Amend the	481
July 28, 1955	57	Radio Act, An Act to Amend the	26a
July 28, 1955	58	St. Lawrence Seaway Authority Act, An Act to Amend the	508
July 28, 1955	59	Transport Act, An Act to Amend the	449
July 28, 1955	60	Appropriation Act No. 5, 1955	510

===== Local and Private Acts =====
Date of Assent	Index	Title	Bill Number
March 24, March 31, May 4, May 26, June 28, July 11 and July 28, 1955	61	Baudette and Rainy River Municipal Bridge Company	I-15
March 24, March 31, May 4, May 26, June 28, July 11 and July 28, 1955	62	Fredericton & Grand Lake Coal & Railway Company	F-10
March 24, March 31, May 4, May 26, June 28, July 11 and July 28, 1955	63	London and Port Stanley Railway Company and the Corporation of the City of London	Q-6
March 24, March 31, May 4, May 26, June 28, July 11 and July 28, 1955	64	St. Mary's River Bridge Company	N-81
March 24, March 31, May 4, May 26, June 28, July 11 and July 28, 1955	65	Caledonian-Canadian Insurance Company	C-8
March 24, March 31, May 4, May 26, June 28, July 11 and July 28, 1955	66	Canadian Premier Life Insurance Company	W-14
March 24, March 31, May 4, May 26, June 28, July 11 and July 28, 1955	67	Commercial Travellers' Association of Canada	S-12
March 24, March 31, May 4, May 26, June 28, July 11 and July 28, 1955	68	Dominion of Canada General Insurance Company	W-12
March 24, March 31, May 4, May 26, June 28, July 11 and July 28, 1955	69	Equitable Fire Insurance Company of Canada	V-12
March 24, March 31, May 4, May 26, June 28, July 11 and July 28, 1955	70	Gillespie Mortgage Corporation	A-13
March 24, March 31, May 4, May 26, June 28, July 11 and July 28, 1955	71	Huron and Erie Mortgage Corporation Act, 1955	G
March 24, March 31, May 4, May 26, June 28, July 11 and July 28, 1955	72	Provident Assurance Company	J-16
March 24, March 31, May 4, May 26, June 28, July 11 and July 28, 1955	73	Victoria Insurance Company of Canada	B-8
March 24, March 31, May 4, May 26, June 28, July 11 and July 28, 1955	74	Sharp & Dohme (Canada) Ltd	G-10
March 24, March 31, May 4, May 26, June 28, July 11 and July 28, 1955	75	Consolidated Pipe Lines Company	C-14
March 24, March 31, May 4, May 26, June 28, July 11 and July 28, 1955	76	Petroleum Transmission Company	X-11
March 24, March 31, May 4, May 26, June 28, July 11 and July 28, 1955	77	S & M Pipeline Limited	W-11
March 24, March 31, May 4, May 26, June 28, July 11 and July 28, 1955	78	Stanmount Pipe Line Company	T-12
March 24, March 31, May 4, May 26, June 28, July 11 and July 28, 1955	79	Trans-Border Pipeline Company Ltd	Z-12
March 24, March 31, May 4, May 26, June 28, July 11 and July 28, 1955	80	Trans-Prairie Pipelines of Canada Ltd	U-12
March 24, March 31, May 4, May 26, June 28, July 11 and July 28, 1955	81	Westcoast Transmission Company Limited	B-14
March 24, March 31, May 4, May 26, June 28, July 11 and July 28, 1955	82	Westspur Pipe Line Company	N-9
March 24, March 31, May 4, May 26, June 28, July 11 and July 28, 1955	83	Yukon Pipelines Limited	X-12
March 24, March 31, May 4, May 26, June 28, July 11 and July 28, 1955	84	Roman Catholic Episcopal Corporation of Pembroke	A-6
March 24, March 31, May 4, May 26, June 28, July 11 and July 28, 1955	85	Seventh-day Adventists, An Act to Incorporate the Canadian Union Conference Corporation of	Y-12
March 24, March 31, May 4, May 26, June 28, July 11 and July 28, 1955	86	Bonaventure and Gaspe Telephone Company Limited	P-6
March 24, March 31, May 4, May 26, June 28, July 11 and July 28, 1955	87	Royal Architectural Institute of Canada, An Act to Consolidate and Amend Acts Relating to the	D-8

==== 3rd Session ====
===== Public acts =====
Date of Assent	Index	Title	Bill Number
March 7, 1956	1	Prairie Grain Producers Interim Financing Act	82
March 7, 1956	2	Temporary Wheat Reserves Act	83
March 22, 1956	3	Appropriation Act No. 1, 1956 (Interim)	206
March 22, 1956	4	Appropriation Act No. 2, 1956 (Further Supplementary)	207
June 7, 1956	5	Canada-Denmark Income Tax Agreement Act, 1956	8
June 7, 1956	6	Canadian Citizenship Act, An Act to Amend the	B
June 7, 1956	7	Department of Transport Act, An Act to Amend the	249
June 7, 1956	8	Judges Act, An Act to Amend the	252
June 7, 1956	9	National Housing Act, 1954, An Act to Amend the	215
June 7, 1956	10	Northern Ontario Pipe Line Crown Corporation Act	298
June 7, 1956	11	St. Lawrence Seaway Authority Act, An Act to Amend the	216
June 7, 1956	12	Trans-Canada Highway Act, An Act to Amend the	214
June 12, 1956	13	Appropriation Act No. 3, 1956 (Interim)	414
June 12, 1956	14	Live Stock and Live Stock Products Act, An Act to Amend the	1-7
June 12, 1956	15	Tariff Board Act, An Act to Amend the	290
June 26, 1956	16	Appropriation Act No. 4, 1956 (Interim)	435
June 26, 1956	17	Canadian Farm Loan Act, An Act to Amend the	84
June 26, 1956	18	Canadian Forces Act	416
June 26, 1956	19	Canadian National Railway Company, An Act Respecting the Construction of a Line of Railway in the province of New Brunswick from a Point at or Near Bartibog in a Westerly Direction to the Tomogonops River in the Vicinity of Little River Lakes	248
June 26, 1956	20	Emergency Gold Mining Assistance Act, An Act to Amend the	417
June 26, 1956	21	Veterans' Business and Professional Loans Act, An Act to Amend the	253
July 11, 1956	22	Canada Lands Surveys Act, An Act to Amend the	254
July 11, 1956	23	Canadian National Railways Financing and Guarantee Act, 1956	415
July 11, 1956	24	Farm Improvement Loans Act, An Act to Amend the	208
July 11, 1956	25	Industrial Development Bank Act, An Act to Amend the	165
July 11, 1956	26	Unemployment Assistance Act	436
July 31, 1956	27	Appropriation Act No. 5, 1956 (Interim)	444
July 31, 1956	28	Canadian and British Insurance Companies Act, An Act to Amend the	T
July 31, 1956	29	Federal-Provincial Tax-Sharing Arrangements Act	442
July 31, 1956	30	Foreign Insurance Companies Act, An Act to Amend the	S
July 31, 1956	31	National Parks Act, Respecting the Boundaries of Cape Breton Highlands National Park, An Act to Amend the	P-8
August 14, 1956	32	Appropriation Act No. 6, 1956 (Main Supply)	453
August 14, 1956	33	Canada-Germany Income Tax Agreements Act, 1956	452
August 14, 1956	34	Canada Shipping Act, An Act to Amend the	H-7
August 14, 1956	35	Canada-United States of America Tax Convention Act	451
August 14, 1956	36	Customs Tariff, An Act to Amend the	448
August 14, 1956	37	Excise Tax Act, An Act to Amend the	450
August 14, 1956	38	Female Employees Equal Pay Act	445
August 14, 1956	39	Income Tax Act, An Act to Amend the	418
August 14, 1956	40	Indian Act, An Act to Amend the	439
August 14, 1956	41	Navigable Waters Protection Act, An Act to Amend the	O-8
August 14, 1956	42	Northwest Territories Power Commission Act, An Act to Amend the	250
August 14, 1956	43	Post Office Act, An Act to Amend the	C
August 14, 1956	44	Public Service Superannuation Act, An Act to Amend the	440
August 14, 1956	45	Royal Canadian Mounted Police Act, An Act to Amend the	446
August 14, 1956	46	Small Loans Act, An Act to Amend the	51
August 14, 1956	47	St. Lawrence Seaway Authority Act, An Act to Amend the	447
August 14, 1956	48	Supreme Court Act and Criminal Code, An Act to Amend the	443
August 14, 1956	49	Telegraphs Act, An Act to Amend the	212
August 14, 1956	50	Unemployment Insurance Act, An Act to Amend the	449

===== Local and Private Acts =====
Date of Assent	Index	Title	Bill Number
March 22, June 7, June 12, June 26, July 11 and August 14, 1956	51	Albion Insurance Company of Canada	H-10
March 22, June 7, June 12, June 26, July 11 and August 14, 1956	52	Canadian Council of Churches	Q-5
March 22, June 7, June 12, June 26, July 11 and August 14, 1956	53	Canadian Equity Insurance Company	J-2
March 22, June 7, June 12, June 26, July 11 and August 14, 1956	54	Canadian Pacific Railway Company	Q-8
March 22, June 7, June 12, June 26, July 11 and August 14, 1956	55	Canadian Pacific Railway Company (Subsidiaries) Act, 1956	V-5
March 22, June 7, June 12, June 26, July 11 and August 14, 1956	56	Canadian Provincial Insurance Company	R-6
March 22, June 7, June 12, June 26, July 11 and August 14, 1956	57	Church of England in Canada, The General Synod of the Missionary Society of the Church of England in Canada, The Woman's Auxiliary of the Church of England in Canada and the Church of England Consolidated Trust Fund	D
March 22, June 7, June 12, June 26, July 11 and August 14, 1956	58	Fellowship of Evangelical Baptist Churches in Canada	F-7
March 22, June 7, June 12, June 26, July 11 and August 14, 1956	59	Grand Falls Central Railway Company Limited	Y-9
March 22, June 7, June 12, June 26, July 11 and August 14, 1956	60	Hydrocarbons Pipeline Limited	Q
March 22, June 7, June 12, June 26, July 11 and August 14, 1956	61	Interprovincial Trust Company	R
March 22, June 7, June 12, June 26, July 11 and August 14, 1956	62	La Paix General Insurance Company of Canada	W-5
March 22, June 7, June 12, June 26, July 11 and August 14, 1956	63	Maritime Stock Breeders' Association	I-10
March 22, June 7, June 12, June 26, July 11 and August 14, 1956	64	Niagara Lower Arch Bridge Company Limited	J-14
March 22, June 7, June 12, June 26, July 11 and August 14, 1956	65	Ogdensburg Bridge Authority	B-10
March 22, June 7, June 12, June 26, July 11 and August 14, 1956	66	Pension Fund Society of the Dominion Bank	G-7
March 22, June 7, June 12, June 26, July 11 and August 14, 1956	67	Personal Finance Company of Canada	G-5
March 22, June 7, June 12, June 26, July 11 and August 14, 1956	68	Quebec North Shore and Labrador Railway Company	Z-2
March 22, June 7, June 12, June 26, July 11 and August 14, 1956	69	Signature Loan and Finance Company	H-5
March 22, June 7, June 12, June 26, July 11 and August 14, 1956	70	Trans-Prairie Pipelines of Canada Ltd	A-10
March 22, June 7, June 12, June 26, July 11 and August 14, 1956	71	Trois-Rivières Bridge	Z-9
March 22, June 7, June 12, June 26, July 11 and August 14, 1956	72	Western Gospel Mission	F-5

==== 4th Session ====
===== Public acts =====
Date of Assent	Index	Title	Bill Number
November 29, 1956	1	Appropriation Act, No. 7, 1956	2

==== 5th Session ====
===== Public acts =====
Date of Assent	Index	Title	Bill Number
February 6, 1957	1	Appropriation Act No. 1, 1957	25
March 28, 1957	2	Appropriation Act No. 2, 1957	
March 28, 1957	3	Canada Council Act	47
March 28, 1957	4	Canada Shipping Act, An Act to Amend the	G-210
March 28, 1957	5	Canadian Farm Loan Act, An Act to Amend the	159
March 28, 1957	6	Canadian Wheat Board Act, An Act to Amend the	9
March 28, 1957	7	Export and Import Permits Act, An Act to Amend the	C-206
March 28, 1957	8	Export Credit Insurance Act, An Act to Amend the	46
March 28, 1957	9	Merchant Seamen Compensation Act, An Act to Amend the	178
March 28, 1957	10	Municipal Grants Act, An Act to Amend the	158
March 28, 1957	11	Pacific Salmon Fisheries Convention Act	180
March 28, 1957	12	Quebec Savings Banks Act, An Act to Amend the	Q-106
April 1, 1957	13	Appropriation Act No. 3, 1957	360
April 12, 1957	14	Appropriation Act No. 4, 1957	418
April 12, 1957	15	Agricultural Products Marketing Act, An Act to Amend the	403
April 12, 1957	16	Canada-Netherlands Income Tax Agreement Act, 1957	413
April 12, 1957	17	Canada-South Africa Death Duties Agreement Act, 1957	415
April 12, 1957	18	Canada-South Africa Income Tax Agreement Act, 1957	414
April 12, 1957	19	Canadian National Railways Financing and Guarantee Act, 1957	411
April 12, 1957	20	Currency, Mint and Exchange Fund Act, An Act to Amend the	H-240
April 12, 1957	21	Customs Tariff, An Act to Amend the	408
April 12, 1957	22	Dominion Succession Duty Act, An Act to Amend the	410
April 12, 1957	23	Eastern Rocky Mountain Forest Conservation Act, An Act to Amend the	X7-225
April 12, 1957	24	Exchequer Court Act, An Act to Amend the	160
April 12, 1957	25	Excise Act, An Act to Amend the	409
April 12, 1957	26	Excise Tax Act, An Act to Amend the	406
April 12, 1957	27	Fertilizers Act	R12-400
April 12, 1957	28	Hospital Insurance and Diagnostic Services Act	320
April 12, 1957	29	Income Tax Act, An Act to Amend the	407
April 12, 1957	30	Judges Act, An Act to Amend the	416
April 12, 1957	31	Pacific Fur Seals Convention Act	412
April 12, 1957	32	Prairie Farm Assistance Act, An Act to Amend the	157
April 12, 1957	33	Prairie Grain Producers Interim Financing Act, 1956, An Act to Amend the	263
April 12, 1957	34	Prisons and Reformatories Act, An Act to Amend the	U9-282
April 12, 1957	35	Royal Canadian Mounted Police Act, An Act to Amend the	E-226
April 12, 1957	36	Territorial Lands Act, An Act to Amend the	F-209
April 12, 1957	37	United Kingdom Financial Agreement Act, 1946, An Act to Amend the	238
April 12, 1957	38	Windsor Harbour Commissioners Act	R1-224
April 12, 1957	39	Appropriation Act No. 5 (Main Supply), 1957	419

===== Local and Private Acts =====
Date of Assent	Index	Title	Bill Number
March 28, April 1 and April 12, 1957	40	Canadian Pacific Railway Company (Subsidiaries) Act, 1957	S-16
March 28, April 1 and April 12, 1957	41	Alliance Nationale, An Act Respecting	T5-204
March 28, April 1 and April 12, 1957	42	British America Assurance Company, An Act Respecting	M8-242
March 28, April 1 and April 12, 1957	43	Canadian Co-operative Credit Society Limited, An Act Respecting	V5-207
March 28, April 1 and April 12, 1957	44	Equitable Fire Insurance Company of Canada, An Act Respecting	K8-265
March 28, April 1 and April 12, 1957	45	Kings Mutual Insurance Company, An Act to Incorporate	A5-205
March 28, April 1 and April 12, 1957	46	Life Underwriters Association of Canada, An Act Respecting	J-14
March 28, April 1 and April 12, 1957	47	North Waterloo Farmers Mutual Insurance Company, An Act to Incorporate	W7-243
March 28, April 1 and April 12, 1957	48	Progressive Insurance Company of Canada, An Act Respecting	F11-343
March 28, April 1 and April 12, 1957	49	Western Assurance Company, An Act Respecting	L8-241
March 28, April 1 and April 12, 1957	50	Alaska-Yukon Pipelines Ltd., An Act to Incorporate	P1-105
March 28, April 1 and April 12, 1957	51	Baptist Convention of Ontario and Quebec, An Act Respecting	Q12-344
March 28, April 1 and April 12, 1957	52	Bishop of the Arctic, An Act Respecting	N8-264
March 28, April 1 and April 12, 1957	53	Les Révérends Pères Oblats de l'Immaculée Conception de Marie, An Act Respecting	I7-266
March 28, April 1 and April 12, 1957	54	Oblate Fathers of Assumption Province, An Act to Incorporate	T-71
March 28, April 1 and April 12, 1957	55	Salvation Army, Canada East, An Act Respecting the Governing Council of The, and the Governing Council of The Salvation Army, Canada West	U5-203

== See also ==
- List of Canadian electoral districts 1952-1966 for a list of the ridings in this parliament.
