= Philip Petursson =

Canadian politician

Philip Markus Petursson (October 21, 1902 in Pinecreek, Minnesota – May 12, 1988) was a politician in Manitoba, Canada. He was a New Democratic member of the Legislative Assembly of Manitoba from 1966 to 1977, and briefly served as a cabinet minister in the government of Edward Schreyer.

The son of Olafar Petursson, he moved to Foam Lake, Saskatchewan with his family during his first year of life and then moved to Winnipeg nine years later. He was educated at the University of Manitoba, the University of Chicago, the Meadville Theological School. He was an ordained Unitarian minister, and served as an executive member of the Western Canadian Unitarian Council; in the 1930s, he studied at the University of Iceland so as to be able to conduct services in that language. He also served on the Winnipeg School Board from 1942 to 1951, and was a member of the Canadian Mental Health Association, the Winnipeg Municipal Hospital Commission, and the Welfare Council of Winnipeg. He married Thorey Gislason in 1926. In 1953, Petursson gained attention in Winnipeg's religious community for speaking out against the concept of hell.

He ran for the House of Commons of Canada in the federal election of 1949 in the riding of Norquay, but lost to Liberal Robert James Wood by almost 4000 votes. He ran again the federal election of 1965, this time placing third in Winnipeg South Centre against Progressive Conservative Gordon Churchill and Liberal Fred Douglas.

Petursson was elected to the Manitoba legislature in the 1966 provincial election, defeating incumbent Progressive Conservative Richard Seaborn in the north-end Winnipeg riding of Wellington. In 1968–69, he supported Edward Schreyer to replace Russell Paulley as leader of the provincial NDP. He was re-elected by an increased margin in the 1969 election, in which the NDP formed a minority government under Schreyer.

On July 17, 1969, Petursson was named Minister of Cultural Affairs. It was always intended that he would return to the backbenches after a brief period in office, and he was indeed dropped from cabinet on November 4, 1970. Petursson remained an active parliamentarian, and was re-elected in the election of 1973. He did not seek re-election in 1977.

He died in Winnipeg at the age of 85.
