= Raymond Lavigne =

Canadian politician (born 1945)

The Honourable Raymond Lavigne

Senator for Montarville, Quebec
- In office March 26, 2002 – March 21, 2011
- Appointed by: Jean Chrétien
- Preceded by: Sheila Finestone
- Succeeded by: Josée Verner

Member of the Canadian Parliament for Verdun—Saint-Henri—Saint-Paul—Pointe Saint-Charles Verdun—Saint-Paul (1993–1997) Verdun—Saint-Henri (1997–2000)
- In office October 25, 1993 – March 25, 2002
- Preceded by: Gilbert Chartrand
- Succeeded by: Liza Frulla

Personal details
- Born: November 16, 1945 (age 80)
- Party: Independent Liberal (2006-2011)
- Other political affiliations: Liberal Party of Canada (1993-2006)
- Spouse: Carmen Robichaud

Raymond Lavigne (born November 16, 1945) is a former Canadian senator and businessman, and a former Member of Parliament (MP).

== Career ==
Lavigne first ran as a Liberal candidate for the House of Commons of Canada in the Quebec riding of Verdun—Saint-Paul at the 1988 election but was unsuccessful. He successfully contested the riding in the 1993 election. He was re-elected as the MP for the riding, with altered boundaries, in the 1997 and 2000 federal elections. He served until he was appointed to the Canadian Senate on March 26, 2002.

He was appointed to the Senate on the advice of Prime Minister Jean Chrétien to make his riding available for Liza Frulla, a former Quebec cabinet minister.

== Criminal charges and convictions ==
On June 8, 2006, he was expelled from the Liberal caucus after allegedly misusing Senate funds for personal use. He apparently used $23,000 in funds for work on his estate, including having his executive assistant cut down trees on his property.

Since then, Lavigne's lawyer said that Lavigne had agreed to pay back the $23,000, without an admission of wrongdoing.

On August 14, 2007, the Royal Canadian Mounted Police, who had been investigating allegations raised concerning the misuse of funds for the last year, laid criminal charges against Lavigne: fraud over $5,000, breach of trust and obstruction of justice. Because of the criminal proceedings, Lavigne is barred from sitting in the Senate or taking part in any Senate committees, but still drew a salary and was entitled to claim expenses.

His trial on these charges began December 9, 2009. Closing arguments took place on September 17, 2010, having been rescheduled from July 2010 to allow Lavigne to obtain trial transcripts. On November 12, 2010, it was announced by the court that Judge Robert Smith's decision is ready but a date for the decision could not be set because Lavigne's lawyers did not show up. A final ruling was scheduled to be issued on February 22, 2011, but the court instead heard argument on how much weight should be given to Senate report on expenses spending. Lavigne's lawyers argued he should not be found guilty because the rules were unclear. On March 11, 2011, Lavigne was found guilty of fraud and breach of trust, and was acquitted on the third charge of obstruction of justice.

Because of the maximum term of 14 years in prison, Lavigne is not eligible for a discharge. Therefore, he will be suspended from the Senate under Senate Rule 141 from the date of his sentencing until his sentence is overturned on appeal or the Senate decides whether to expel him. Under Rules 138–139, he will not receive a sessional allowance or various perquisites to which senators are entitled; it is not clear whether his salary will be affected by the suspension.

On March 21, 2011, Lavigne resigned from the Senate.

On May 10, 2011, Lavigne was sentenced to six months in prison with an additional, consecutive six month conditional sentence to be served at home. Lavigne appealed both his convictions and sentences, but his appeals were rejected. He began serving his sentence in June, 2013.

== Electoral record ==
2000 Canadian federal election: Verdun–Saint-Henri–Saint-Paul–Pointe Saint-Charles
Party	Candidate	Votes	%	Expenditures
Liberal	Raymond Lavigne (incumbent)	20,905	51.27	$59,347
Bloc Québécois	Pedro Utillano	11,976	29.37	$34,065
Progressive Conservative	Bernard Côté	2,670	6.55	$3,761
Alliance	Jacques Gendron	2,098	5.15	$12,598
New Democratic	Matthew McLauchlin	1,003	2.46	$1,499
Green	Lorraine Ann Craig	933	2.29	$22
Marijuana	Marc-André Roy	924	2.27	$46
Communist	Bill Sloan	148	0.36	$1,627
Christian Heritage	William Lorenson	117	0.29	$298
Total valid votes		40,774	100.00	
Total rejected ballots		1,200		
Turnout		41,974	59.05	
Electors on the lists		71,085		
Sources: Official Results, Elections Canada and Financial Returns, Elections Canada.

1997 Canadian federal election
Party	Candidate	Votes
Liberal	Raymond Lavigne	21,424
Bloc Québécois	Donald Longépée	15,153
Progressive Conservative	Aline Aubut	6,838
New Democratic	Claude Ledoux	1,156
Natural Law	Michèle Beausoleil	498
Reform	Deepak Massand	380
Marxist–Leninist	Geneviève Royer	205

1993 Canadian federal election: Verdun—Saint-Paul
Party	Candidate	Votes	%	±%	Expenditures
Liberal	Raymond Lavigne	19,644	43.69	–	$36,451
Bloc Québécois	Kim Beaudoin	19,095	42.47		$35,583
Progressive Conservative	André Martin	3,864	8.59		$51,508
New Democratic Party	Claude Ledoux	860	1.91		$0
Green	Jean-Marc Beaudin	598	1.33		$1
Natural Law	Marylise Baux	432	0.96		$408
Abolitionist	Yvan Cousineau	140	0.31		$0
National	J.J. McPherson	130	0.29		$466
Non-affiliated	Deepak Massand	115	0.26		$6,744
Commonwealth	Golam Khan	88	0.20		$0
Total valid votes		44,966	100.00		
Total rejected ballots		1,720			
Turnout		46,686	75.50		
Electors on the lists		61,838			
Source: Thirty-fifth General Election, 1993: Official Voting Results, Published by the Chief Electoral Officer of Canada. Financial figures taken from the official contributions and expenses submitted by the candidates, provided by Elections Canada.

1988 Canadian federal election
Party	Candidate	Votes
Progressive Conservative	Gilbert Chartrand	20,113
Liberal	Raymond Lavigne	15,207
New Democratic	Alain Tassé	6,572
Green	Jan-Marc Lavergne	1,339
Rhinoceros	Irène Maman Mayer	902
Commonwealth of Canada	Claude Brosseau	142
Independent	Yvon Turgeon	105
