= Norquay =

Norquay can refer to several places named for John Norquay, former Premier of Manitoba, Canada

- Norquay (electoral district) - federal electoral district in Manitoba, Canada
- Mount Norquay - mountain in Alberta, Canada
- Mount Norquay ski resort - ski resort in Alberta, Canada
- John Norquay Elementary School - school in Vancouver, British Columbia, Canada
- Norquay, Saskatchewan
