= Herbert Meredith Marler =

Canadian politician

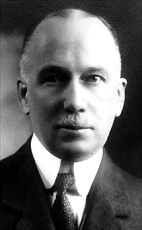
- The Hon. Sir Herbert Meredith Marler
- Born: March 7, 1876; Montreal, Quebec, Canada
- Died: January 31, 1940 (aged 63)
- Occupations: Politician, Diplomat

Sir Herbert Meredith Marler KCMG PC (March 7, 1876 – January 31, 1940) was a Canadian politician and diplomat.

Born in Montreal, Quebec, Marler earned a law degree from McGill University and entered his father's notary business which eventually expanded into the firm Marler & Marler. In 1902, he married the Montreal socialite Beatrice Isabel Allan, granddaughter of Andrew Allan and Matthew Hamilton Gault.

Marler entered the Canadian civil service in 1918 and was elected to the House of Commons three years later in the 1921 federal election as the Liberal Member of Parliament for St. Lawrence—St. George. He was promoted to Cabinet as Minister without portfolio in 1925 only to lose his seat shortly after in the 1925 federal election.

Liberal Prime Minister William Lyon Mackenzie King held Marler in high regard and appointed him Canada's first envoy to Japan. He was given the formal title of Envoy Extraordinary and Minister Plenipotentiary of Canada to the Empire of Japan in 1929. Marler was knighted in 1935 for his services and returned from this posting in 1936. He was the third person ever appointed by the Canadian government as an envoy abroad with full diplomatic status. His predecessors were Vincent Massey who was appointed Canadian envoy to the United States in 1926 and Philippe Roy who was appointed envoy to France in 1928. He considered himself Canadian Minister to the Orient, though he was formally only the Minister to Japan. He focused his attention on building Canadian trade with Japan and China touring both countries extensively. He also undertook a speaking tour across Canada in 1931 in which he encouraged commerce between Canada and East Asia.

Upon returning from Japan in 1936, he was appointed Envoys Extraordinary and Ministers Plenipotentiary of Canada to the United States of America and served in that capacity until 1939.

Parliament of Canada
Preceded by Charles Ballantyne	Member of Parliament for St. Lawrence—St. George; 1921–1925	Succeeded by Charles Cahan
