= Charles Ballantyne =

Canadian politician (1867–1950)

The Honourable Charles Colquhoun Ballantyne PC
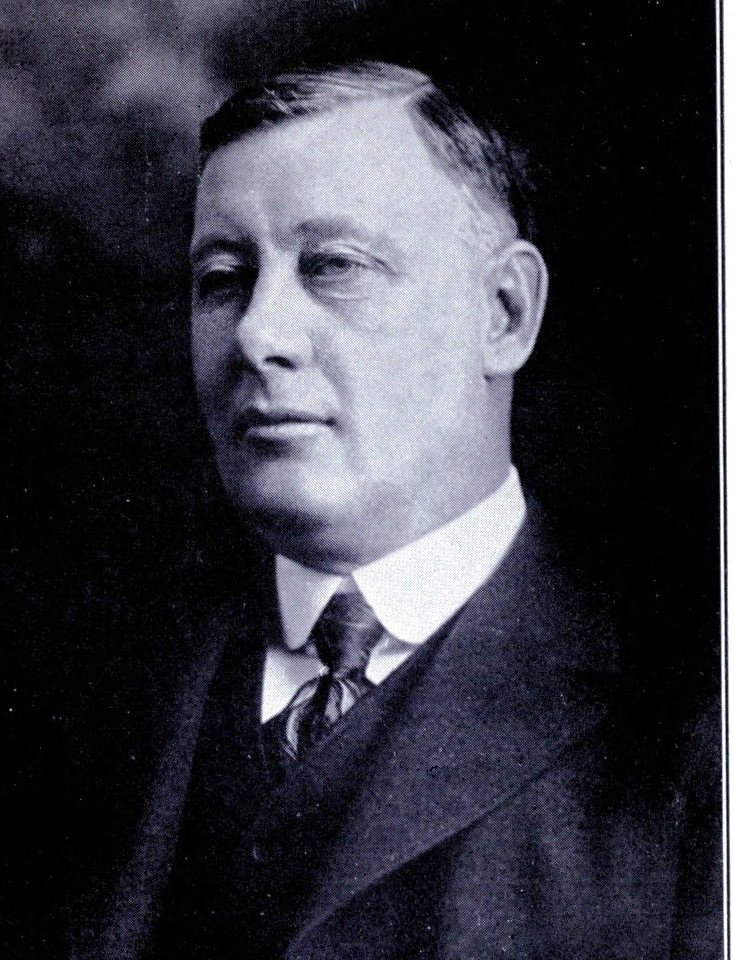

Senator for Alma, Quebec
- In office February 3, 1932 – October 19, 1950
- Appointed by: R. B. Bennett
- Preceded by: George Green Foster
- Succeeded by: Hartland Molson

Member of the Canadian Parliament for St. Lawrence—St. George
- In office 1917–1921
- Preceded by: The riding was created in 1914.
- Succeeded by: Herbert Meredith Marler

Personal details
- Born: August 9, 1867 Colquhoun, Canada West
- Died: October 19, 1950 (aged 83)
- Party: Unionist (Conservative and Liberal) (1918–1921); Conservative (1932–1942); Progressive Conservative (1942–1950)
- Cabinet: Minister of Public Works (1917); Minister of the Naval Service (1917–1921); Minister of Marine and Fisheries (1917–1921)

Military service
- Branch/service: Canadian Expeditionary Force
- Years of service: 1916-1917
- Rank: Commander
- Unit: 1st Battalion Grenadier Guards of Canada

Charles Colquhoun Ballantyne, PC (August 9, 1867 – October 19, 1950) was a Canadian politician.

A millionaire and one-time owner of Sherwin Williams Paints in Montreal, Ballantyne was president of the Canadian Manufacturer's Association and a member of the Montreal Harbour Board. He also raised and commanded the 1st Battalion Grenadier Guards of Canada. He was appointed to Sir Robert Borden's World War I Union government. He held no parliamentary seat when Borden appointed him minister of public works, minister of marine and fisheries and minister of the naval service in October 1917. He became a Cabinet minister prior to being elected to the House of Commons of Canada in the December 1917 federal election; delayed for two weeks because of the Halifax Explosion. Ballantyne was one of a handful of Unionist Members of Parliament (MPs) elected from Quebec during the Conscription Crisis of 1917.

Even before the inquiry into the Halifax disaster had completed its proceedings on 4 February 1918, Ballantyne initiated the formation of a Royal Commission to investigate the Halifax Pilotage. As a result of the commission's findings (unpublished), Prime Minister Borden invoked the War Measures Act in mid-March. Subsequently, the government took control over the port of Halifax until the end of the war. Ballantyne retained his Cabinet portfolios when Arthur Meighen succeeded Borden as Prime Minister of Canada, but was defeated as a Conservative candidate in the 1921 election that brought down the Meighen government.

In 1932, Conservative Prime Minister R. B. Bennett appointed Ballantyne to the Senate of Canada. Ballantyne was appointed Leader of the Opposition in the Canadian Senate in 1942, and served in that role until 1945.

== Archives ==
There is a Charles Colquhoun Ballantyne fonds at Library and Archives Canada.

== Footnotes ==
Government offices
Preceded by Arthur Meighen	Leader of the Opposition in the Senate of Canada; 1942–1945	Succeeded by John Thomas Haig
