= Eric Stefanson Sr. =

Canadian politician

Eric Stefanson
- Official 1966 portrait

Member of Parliament for Selkirk
- In office March 1958 – June 1968
- Preceded by: William Bryce
- Succeeded by: Ed Schreyer

Personal details
- Born: 8 January 1913 Winnipeg, Manitoba
- Died: 3 February 1977 (aged 64) Gimli, Manitoba
- Party: Progressive Conservative
- Spouse(s): Sigrun Sigurdson m. 19 May 1935
- Profession: insurance agent, merchant

Eric Stefanson (8 January 1913 – 3 February 1977) was a Progressive Conservative party member of the House of Commons of Canada. He was born in Winnipeg, Manitoba and became an insurance agent and merchant by career.

Stefanson attended public school in Vestfold then high school in Winnipeg at Daniel McIntyre Collegiate Institute. From 1950 to 1957, he was a municipal councillor for Gimli and served for four years as deputy mayor there.

He was first elected at Manitoba's Selkirk riding in the 1958 general election then re-elected for successive terms in the 1962, 1963 and 1965 federal elections. In the 1968 election he was defeated at Selkirk by Ed Schreyer of the New Democratic Party.

After leaving federal politics, Stefanson became general manager of the Interlake Development Corporation in 1970, where he served until his sudden death in 1977.

His son, Eric Stefanson, was a member of Manitoba's legislature.
