= Egan Chambers =

Canadian politician (1921–1994)

Member of the Canadian Parliament for St. Lawrence—St. George
- In office 1958–1962
- Preceded by: Claude Richardson
- Succeeded by: John Turner

Personal details
- Born: March 22, 1921 Montreal, Quebec, Canada
- Died: May 5, 1994 (aged 73) Montreal, Quebec, Canada
- Party: Progressive Conservative
- Spouse: Gretta Chambers
- Portfolio: Parliamentary Secretary to the Minister of National Defence (1959-1961 & 1962)

Egan Chambers (March 22, 1921 – May 5, 1994) was a Canadian politician.

Born in Montreal, Quebec, he was educated at Selwyn House School and Bishop's College School. He was elected to the House of Commons of Canada in the 1958 federal election in the riding of St. Lawrence—St. George. A Progressive Conservative, he was defeated in 1962. He also ran unsuccessfully in the 1953, 1957, 1965 elections and a 1954 by-election. From 1959 to 1961 and in 1962, he was the Parliamentary Secretary to the Ministers of National Defence George Pearkes and Douglas Harkness.

He was the husband of journalist Gretta Chambers and brother-in-law of philosopher Charles Taylor. Chambers is buried in Mount Royal Cemetery in Montreal.

== Electoral record (partial) ==
1962 Canadian federal election: St. Lawrence—St. George
Party	Candidate	Votes	%	±%
Liberal	John Turner	7,227	51.94	
Progressive Conservative	Egan Chambers	4,969	35.71	
New Democratic	R. Barry Rutland	1,282	9.21	
Social Credit	Eugène Caraghiaur	437	3.14	
Total valid votes		13,915	100.00	
Total rejected ballots		274		
Turnout		14,189	64.70	
Electors on the lists		21,929		

== See also ==
- List of Bishop's College School alumni
