= Charles Cahan =

Canadian politician (1861–1944)

The Honourable Charles Cahan PC KC

27th Secretary of State for Canada
- In office 1930–1935
- Prime Minister: R.B. Bennett
- Preceded by: Fernand Rinfret
- Succeeded by: Fernand Rinfret

Member of the Canadian Parliament for St. Lawrence—St. George
- In office 1925–1940
- Preceded by: Herbert Meredith Marler
- Succeeded by: Brooke Claxton

Leader of the Liberal-Conservative Party of Nova Scotia
- In office 1890–1894
- Preceded by: William MacKay
- Succeeded by: William MacKay

Member of the Nova Scotia House of Assembly for Shelburne
- In office 1890–1894
- Preceded by: William F. MacCoy
- Succeeded by: Thomas Robertson

Personal details
- Born: Charles Hazlitt Cahan; October 31, 1861 Hebron, Colony of Nova Scotia
- Died: August 15, 1944 (aged 82) Hebron, Nova Scotia, Canada
- Party: Liberal-Conservative Party of Nova Scotia; Conservative Party of Canada
- Spouses: Mary J. Hetherington (m. 1887; died 1914) Juliette Elisa Charlotte (m. 1918)
- Children: John Flint Cahan; Charles H. Cahan, Jr.; Lois Theresa
- Education: Yarmouth Seminary; Dalhousie University
- Occupation: Lawyer; politician; businessman; newspaper editor

Charles Hazlitt Cahan PC KC (October 31, 1861 – August 15, 1944) was a Canadian lawyer, newspaper editor, businessman, and provincial and federal politician.

== Biography ==
Cahan, a Presbyterian of Irish descent, was born in Hebron, Nova Scotia. He was the son of Charles Cahan Jr. and had three siblings: Frank D. Cahan (1863–1936), Jennie M. Cahan (1866–1918) and Loie S. Cahan (1871–1881).

He was educated at Yarmouth Seminary and Dalhousie University. He married Mary J. Hetherington of Halifax, Nova Scotia in March 1887; she died in July 1914. In January 1918, he married Juliette Elisa Charlotte Hulin of Paris, France. Cahan had two sons, John Flint Cahan (1889–1928) and Charles H. Cahan, Jr. (1887–1970), and one daughter, Lois Theresa (1891–1964).

Cahan died on August 15, 1944, and is buried at Riverside Cemetery, in Hebron, Nova Scotia.

== Career ==
Cahan was chief editorial writer of the Halifax Herald and Mail from 1886 to 1894. He was called to the bar in Nova Scotia in 1893 and in Quebec Bar in 1907, designated KC in 1907 (Nova Scotia) and 1909 (Quebec). He practiced corporate law in Halifax as a partner at Harris, Henry & Cahan from 1893 to 1908, and in Montreal, Quebec, from 1908.

In private business, Cahan was a lawyer and financier for extensive tramway operations in South America, Trinidad and Mexico. In 1902, Cahan became the general counsel and on-site manager of the Mexican Light and Power Company Limited.

=== Early political career ===
From 1890 to 1894, Cahan was a leader of the Liberal-Conservative Party in Nova Scotia Legislature and a member of the Nova Scotia Legislature for Shelbourne. He also served as Hon. Secretary, Halifax Branch, Imperial Federation League, Hon. Secretary, Liberal-Conservative Association, Nova Scotia, and Director of Public Safety for Canada during World War I.

In his article, "The Role of Lawyers in Corporate Promotion and Management: A Canadian Case Study and Theoretical Speculations" (see link below), Marchildon states, "With his four-year arts degree, as well as a law degree from the Dalhousie Law School in Halifax, Charles Cahan was one of the few formally educated practitioners in late nineteenth century Canada. This gave Cahan flexibility and, rather than immediately pursuing a legal career, he worked first as a newspaper editor and then became a politician. Only when he was electorally defeated in 1896 did he turn to the practice of law."

Between 1887 and 1891, an attempt by Cahan and others to secure a federal civil service appointment for John James Stewart, owner of the Halifax Herald and Mail, came to nothing. Cahan attributed this result to the influence of Sir Charles Tupper and his son, Charles Hibbert Tupper, who were critics of Herald policies.

In 1901, Cahan managed the provincial campaign for his business associate, John Fitzwilliam Stairs who was the leader of the Nova Scotia Liberal-Conservative Union and a former Conservative house leader.

=== Member of Parliament ===
Cahan was first elected to the House of Commons in the 1925 election as a Conservative Party Member of Parliament in the riding of St. Lawrence—St. George, and was re-elected on four consecutive occasions, serving in the House of Commons until 1940. He served as Secretary of State of Canada in the 1930–1935 cabinet of Prime Minister R.B. Bennett.

He was a candidate for the Conservative Party leadership at the 1927 Conservative leadership convention, finishing in third place. Cahan's policies were clearly ahead of their time, as in a review of Glassford's book, Reaction and Reform: The Politics of the Conservative Party under R.B. Bennett, 1927–1938, it is stated, "The title of the book is most clearly revealed, perhaps, in the conflicts within the party that Bennett was unable to resolve. Glassford's party had three parts: the populists led by H.H. Stevens; C.H. Cahan's rugged individualists; and Bennett's paternalistic Conservatives somewhere in between. In the end Bennett cast Stevens aside, rugged individualism seemed a pitiful response to the Depression, and the radical tone of Bennett's rendering of paternal conservatism was branded either as heresy or a cynical power grab...In the epilogue, after racing through Tory leaders since Bennett, he states that with the election of Brian Mulroney, 'the old struggle between reaction and reform had taken an interesting twist. Under the imported titles of Thatcherism and Reaganomics, the laisser-faire principles of C.H. Cahan acquired a whole new respectability, though it is doubtful that many in the party had ever heard of him.' "

In 1927, Cahan advocated for an independent Supreme Court of Canada, but stated, "We must give to our own Supreme Court a higher standing, and create greater confidence in its decisions on the part of the people of this country before we can abrogate the right of appeal to the Privy Council." After having publicly lamented that the poor quality of the Supreme Court prevented the abrogation of appeals, in the late 1930s he attacked the Privy Council's interpretation of the BNA Act and demanded the end of appeals to the Judicial Committee of the Privy Council. Like many Canadian legal scholars, Cahan believed that the Privy Council had deliberately attempted to alter the true meaning of the Canadian Constitution. He concluded that members of the Privy Council were "personally ignorant" of Canada yet arrogated "to themselves a prescience and clairvoyance which entitles them to substitute their judgments and even their personal preferences, for the deliberate legislative enactments of the elected representatives of the people who sit in the parliament of Canada". Cahan introduced a bill, in 1939, to abolish appeals and, after the bill received considerable support in Parliament, the Minister of Justice, Ernest Lapointe, referred it to the Supreme Court, thus affording the Court an opportunity to adjudicate its own pre-eminence. The Court found that it was within the Dominion government's authority to end appeals to the Privy Council unilaterally without the approval of the provinces. The government postponed the implementation of the legislation until after the Second World War, and after an unsuccessful appeal to the Privy Council of the Supreme Court's decision. Finally, in 1949, the government enacted legislation establishing that new litigation could not be appealed to the Privy Council.

In 1929, Cahan moved in the House of Commons that a special committee be formed to reconsider the 1919 Nickle Resolution, which had marked the earliest attempt to establish a Canadian government policy forbidding the British and, later, Canadian Sovereign from granting knighthoods, baronetcies, and peerages to Canadians, and set the precedent for later policies prohibiting Canadians from accepting or holding titles of honour from Commonwealth or foreign countries. He noted that the Nickle Resolution favoured foreign sovereigns over Canada's own sovereign because, since 1919, some 646 foreign orders had been conferred upon persons living in Canada by foreign, non-British sovereigns. The vote on Charles Cahan's motion, on February 14, showed that Prime Minister William Lyon Mackenzie King and the Conservative leader of the opposition, Richard B. Bennett, both voted "yea" with Charles Cahan, but the motion was defeated.[6]

Relations between Canada's religious communities was an important issue that Cahan had to deal with as Secretary of State. As stated by McEvoy in Religion and Politics in Foreign Policy: Canadian Government Relations with the Vatican, "Cahan, though a Presbyterian, had forged close contacts with the Catholic clergy both in his native Nova Scotia and later in Quebec. He had come to the conclusion that domestic peace in Canada was largely dependent upon the happiness of the French Canadian people and clergy. Unfortunately, for reasons unknown to him, he now found them in June 1931 'disposed to be anxious and sorrowful' and felt strongly that everything possible should be done to alleviate their discontent. Finding Bennett unwilling to intervene, Cahan wrote on his own responsibility to the British Chargé d'affaires to the Holy See, George Ogilvie-Forbes, requesting him to raise the matter delicately at the Vatican, an initiative approved by Archbishop Gauthier of Montreal...In September 1931 Ogilvie-Forbes told Cahan that "the subject of your last letter has reached the proper and highest quarters.' "

Cahan also had to deal with problems of precedence within the Catholic community. At a state dinner following the opening of Parliament in January 1934, Cardinal Villeneuve was ranked behind the apostolic delegate and the Archbishop Forbes of Ottawa, who had seniority as an archbishop. Villeneuve, who considered himself as head of the church in Canada, refused to attend the dinner. The incident was covered by the press and Cahan, who was the responsible minister, offered to resign. As stated by McEvoy, "To Cahan, a contented French-Canadian clergy could help ensure domestic peace in Canada".

As Secretary of State of Canada, Charles Cahan was a Canadian delegate to the League of Nations in 1932, at which he gave a speech on Canada's position with respect to the dispute between Japan and China. This speech provoked a minor political incident due to what was taken to be Canada's implicit recognition of Japan's occupation of China. The speech prompted an arguably prescient critique at the Empire Club of Canada by W.L. Grant entitled, "Does Canada Take the League of Nations Seriously".

Cahan lost his seat in the 1940 general election.

=== Awards and honors ===
Cahan was a guest speaker at the Empire Club of Canada in 1919 on the subject of propaganda, and in 1929 on the subject of constitutional issues. In 1939, he was a guest speaker at the Canadian Club of Ottawa in 1939 on the subject of Pan-American relations.

Cahan was awarded an honorary Doctor of Laws from Dalhousie University in 1919. He is a member of the Nova Scotia Railway Hall of Fame.

== Archives ==
There is a Charles Hazlitt Cahan fonds at Library and Archives Canada.
