= Jules Wermenlinger =

Canadian politician

Edgard Jules Wermenlinger

Member of Parliament for Verdun
- In office October 1935 – March 1940
- Preceded by: riding created
- Succeeded by: Paul-Émile Côté

Personal details
- Born: Edgard Jules Wermenlinger; 9 July 1888 Montreal, Quebec, Canada
- Died: 18 November 1956
- Party: Conservative
- Spouse(s): Antonine Lalande m. 11 September 1917
- Profession: civil engineer, merchant

Edgard Jules Wermenlinger (9 July 1888 – 18 November 1956) was a Conservative member of the House of Commons of Canada. He was born in Montreal, Quebec and became a civil engineer and electrical appliance merchant.

Wermenlinger attended Mont St-Louis College and the Université de Montréal. Beginning in 1932, he was a school commissioner for Verdun, Quebec and the following year he became an alderman for that municipality. He held those positions until his bid for federal office in 1935.

He was first elected to Parliament at the Verdun riding in the 1935 general election. After serving one term, the 18th Canadian Parliament, Wermenlinger entered the 1940 election as a National Government (Conservative) candidate but was defeated by Paul-Émile Côté of the Liberal Party.
