= Gretta Chambers =

Canadian journalist (1927–2017)

Gretta Chambers CC OQ

16th Chancellor of McGill University
- In office 1991–1999

Personal details
- Born: Gretta Taylor; January 15, 1927 Montreal, Quebec, Canada
- Died: September 9, 2017 (aged 90) Montreal, Quebec, Canada
- Known for: Former journalist and chancellor of McGill University
- Awards: Order of Canada; National Order of Quebec

Gretta Chambers CC OQ (née Taylor; January 15, 1927 – September 9, 2017) was a Canadian journalist and former Chancellor of McGill University.

== Life and career ==
Chambers grew up in Outremont and attended Miss Edgar's and Miss Cramp's School and Netherwood School. She received a BA in political science from McGill University in 1947. She worked in radio and television and wrote for several newspapers and magazines. From 1966 until 1980, she was the host of the weekly CBC radio show called The Province in Print. From 1977 to 2002, she had a weekly column in the Montreal Gazette.

Since its inception in 1991, until her death in 2017, she was involved with the Montreal Consortium for Human Rights Advocacy Training (MCHRAT) at McGill University. When a MCHRAT project, the McGill Middle East Program (MMEP), took off in 1997, Chambers became a co-chair of its executive and management committees.

She was chancellor of McGill University from 1991 to 1999, the first woman to serve in this position. In 2003, Martin Cauchon, Minister of Justice and Attorney General of Canada, appointed her to the Judicial Compensation and Benefits Commission, effective until August 31, 2007.

Her brother is McGill University philosopher Charles Taylor. Her husband was Egan Chambers, former Canadian member of parliament. She was survived by her five children and eight grandchildren.

== Honours and awards ==
In 1993, she was named an Officer of the National Order of Quebec. In 1994, she was made a Member of the Order of Canada, and she was promoted to Companion in 2000.

Academic offices
Preceded by A. Jean de Grandpré	Chancellor of McGill University; 1991–1999	Succeeded by Dick Pound
