= Harold Monteith =

Canadian politician

Member of Parliament for Verdun
- In office March 1958 – June 1962
- Preceded by: Yves Leduc
- Succeeded by: Bryce Mackasey

Personal details
- Born: Harold Edmond Monteith; 2 October 1900 Verdun, Quebec
- Died: 9 September 1963 (aged 62) Eastman, Quebec
- Party: Progressive Conservative
- Spouse: Helen Leggatt
- Profession: Agent, merchant

Harold Edmond Monteith (2 October 1900 – 9 September 1963) was a Progressive Conservative party member of the House of Commons of Canada. He was born in Verdun, Quebec and became an agent and merchant.

He was elected at the Verdun riding in the 1958 general election after unsuccessful attempts to win there in 1953 and 1957. After serving his only federal term, the 24th Canadian Parliament, he was defeated by Bryce Mackasey of the Liberal party in the 1962 election.

Monteith died at Eastman, Quebec aged 62, survived by his wife and two sons.
