= Yvon Dupuis =

Canadian politician (1926–2017)

The Honourable Yvon Dupuis PC

Member of the Canadian Parliament for Saint-Jean—Iberville—Napierville
- In office 1958–1965
- Preceded by: J.-Armand Ménard
- Succeeded by: Jean-Paul Beaulieu

Member of the Legislative Assembly of Quebec for Montréal–Sainte-Marie
- In office 1952–1956
- Preceded by: Aime Gendron
- Succeeded by: Edgar Charbonneau

Personal details
- Born: October 11, 1926 Montreal, Quebec
- Died: January 1, 2017 (aged 90) Longueuil, Quebec
- Party: Liberal

Yvon Dupuis, PC (October 11, 1926 – January 1, 2017) was a Canadian politician.

== Political career ==
Born in Montreal, Dupuis was educated at Collège de Varennes in Longeuil, Quebec, and worked as an insurance agent and as the owner of two music stores prior to running for elected office.

He was first elected to the National Assembly of Quebec in the 1952 provincial election in the riding of Montréal–Sainte-Marie as a member of the Liberal Party of Quebec. He was defeated in the 1956 provincial election. He ran unsuccessfully as an independent Liberal in Saint-Jean—Iberville—Napierville in the 1957 federal election, but was successful as the Liberal Party of Canada candidate in the same riding in the 1958 federal election. He was re-elected in the 1962 and 1963 elections. He was appointed Parliamentary Secretary to the Secretary of State by Prime Minister Lester Pearson on May 14, 1963, and served in that role until he was appointed minister without portfolio on February 3, 1964.

He was accused of accepting a bribe related to the licensing of a new race track in his riding, and resigned from the cabinet on January 22, 1965. He was defeated as an independent Liberal candidate in the 1965 federal election. Dupuis was acquitted of the corruption charges on April 16, 1968.

On February 4, 1973, he was elected leader of the Ralliement créditiste du Québec, but failed to win election in Saint-Jean in the 1973 provincial election. Under pressure to resign as leader, he left the party and founded the Parti présidentiel on May 5, 1974. He resigned as leader of his new party on October 21, 1974, and announced the end of his political career. He was replaced as leader by Yvon Brochu, who merged the party with the Union Nationale on May 31, 1975.

== Post-political activities ==
Dupuis later worked as a radio announcer on CKVL, CKAC, CHLT and CIBL radio stations. He was the president of Publivox Inc., and owner of Agence de Voyages Yvon Dupuis Inc. from 1981 to 2003. He died on January 1, 2017, at the age of 90.

== See also ==
- Politics of Quebec
- List of Quebec general elections
- National Assembly of Quebec
- Timeline of Quebec history
- List of political parties in Quebec
