= Canadian Slovak League =

Non-profit organization of Slovak Canadians

Canadian Slovak Leaguead
- Kanadská Slovenská Liga
- Formation: 1932
- Headquarters: Mississauga
- President: Agnes Belosic
- Website: https://kanadskyslovak.ca/

The Canadian Slovak League (Slovak: Kanadská Slovenská Liga) or CSL (Slovak: KSL) is a non-profit organization of Slovak Canadians, founded in 1932 in Winnipeg by members of the Slovak League in America. It has been estimated that there were 78 branches of American Slovak organizations operating in Canada in the 1930's.

In February 1934, having acquired its own legal personality, the organization also provided a platform for political exiles—supporters and prominent figures associated with the wartime Slovak State. After 1990, its officials actively campaigned for the dissolution of Czechoslovak, even offering "investment incentives" to promote this cause; however, these offers were never actually carried out. Later, conversely, the Slovak Republic provided the KSL with targeted subsidies.
