= Saint-Jean—Iberville—Napierville =

Former federal electoral district in Quebec, Canada

Quebec electoral district

Defunct federal electoral district
- Legislature: House of Commons
- District created: 1947
- District abolished: 1967
- First contested: 1949
- Last contested: 1965

Saint-Jean—Iberville—Napierville (French pronunciation: [sɛ̃ ʒɑ̃ ibɛʁvil napjɛʁvil]) was a federal electoral district in the province of Quebec, Canada, that was represented in the House of Commons of Canada from 1949 to 1968.

This riding was created in 1947 from parts of Beauharnois—Laprairie and St. Johns—Iberville—Napierville ridings. It consisted of:

- the city of St. Jean and the county of St. John (except the municipalities of Notre-Dame-du-Mont-Carmel, St. Bernard-de-Lacolle and the village of Lacolle);
- the county of Iberville and the town of Iberville;
- the county of Napierville;
- that part of the county of Laprairie included in the municipality of St-Jacques-le-Mineur.

It was abolished in 1966 when it was redistributed into Missisquoi and Saint-Jean ridings.

== Members of Parliament ==
This riding elected the following members of Parliament:

Parliament	Years	Member	Party
Saint-Jean—Iberville—Napierville; Riding created from Beauharnois—Laprairie and St. Johns—Iberville—Napierville
21st	1949–1953	Alcide Côté	Liberal
22nd	1953–1955	Alcide Côté	Liberal
22nd	1955–1957	J.-Armand Ménard	Liberal
23rd	1957–1958	J.-Armand Ménard	Liberal
24th	1958–1962	Yvon Dupuis	Liberal
25th	1962–1963	Yvon Dupuis	Liberal
26th	1963–1965	Yvon Dupuis	Liberal
27th	1965–1968	Jean-Paul Beaulieu	Progressive Conservative
Riding dissolved into Missisquoi and Saint-Jean

== Election results ==
1949 Canadian federal election
Party	Candidate	Votes
Liberal	Alcide Côté	12,823
Independent	Martial Rhéaume	4,478
Union des électeurs	Paul-Émile Bourdon	417
Progressive Conservative	René Perrault	343

1953 Canadian federal election
Party	Candidate	Votes
Liberal	Alcide Côté	16,088
Progressive Conservative	Yvon Roy	2,001
Co-operative Commonwealth	Georges-M. St-Amour	238

By-election on 19 December 1955 On Côté's death, 7 August 1955
Party	Candidate	Votes
Liberal	J.-Armand Ménard	9,920
Independent Liberal	Philodor Ouimet	8,285
Progressive Conservative	Vial Lavoie	2,997
Independent Liberal	Armand Ménard	411
Independent Liberal	Charlemagne Hébert	58
Labor–Progressive	Gaston Viens	23

1957 Canadian federal election
Party	Candidate	Votes
Liberal	J.-Armand Ménard	13,427
Independent Liberal	Yvon Dupuis	11,859
Progressive Conservative	Alcide Hébert	378

1958 Canadian federal election
Party	Candidate	Votes
Liberal	Yvon Dupuis	14,332
Progressive Conservative	Robert Sauvé	12,100

1962 Canadian federal election
Party	Candidate	Votes
Liberal	Yvon Dupuis	14,147
Progressive Conservative	Robert Sauvé	7,849
New Democratic	Fernand Roy	4,114
Social Credit	Jean-Marc Dagesse	1,173

1963 Canadian federal election
Party	Candidate	Votes
Liberal	Yvon Dupuis	14,656
Social Credit	Dollard Richard	7,081
Progressive Conservative	Yvan Sabourin	4,461
New Democratic	A.-Jean Marceau	1,599

1965 Canadian federal election
Party	Candidate	Votes
Progressive Conservative	Jean-Paul Beaulieu	12,510
Liberal	Jean Desmarais	6,784
Independent Liberal	Yvon Dupuis	6,338
New Democratic	Jean-Jacques Jauniaux	2,260
Ralliement créditiste	Louis Poirier	785

== See also ==
- List of Canadian electoral districts
- Historical federal electoral districts of Canada
