= Robert James Wood =

Canadian politician

Member of Parliament for Norquay
- In office June 1949 – August 1953
- Preceded by: riding created
- Succeeded by: riding dissolved

Member of Parliament for Selkirk
- In office August 1953 – August 1954
- Preceded by: William Bryce
- Succeeded by: William Bryce

Personal details
- Born: Robert James Wood; 27 March 1886 Teulon, Manitoba
- Died: 8 August 1954 (aged 68) Teulon, Manitoba
- Party: Liberal
- Spouse: June Camyre (m. 1910)
- Profession: merchant

Robert James Wood (27 March 1886 – 8 August 1954) was a Liberal party member of the House of Commons of Canada. He was born in Teulon, Manitoba and became a merchant by career.

He was elected at Norquay, a Manitoba riding which only existed for the 1949 general election before it was dissolved in 1952. Wood then became the Liberal candidate at Selkirk, an electoral district which he unsuccessfully campaigned in for the 1945 election. Wood returned to Parliament after his victory at Selkirk in the 1953 election. However, he died in office before completing his term in the 22nd Canadian Parliament.
