= Gilbert Chartrand =

Canadian politician

Gilbert Chartrand (born 3 November 1954) was a Progressive Conservative member of the House of Commons of Canada. He was a businessman and trader by career.

Born in Verdun, Quebec, Chartrand represented the Quebec riding of Verdun—Saint-Paul where he was first elected in the 1984 federal election and re-elected in 1988, therefore becoming a member in the 33rd and 34th Canadian Parliaments.

On 22 May 1990, he left the Progressive Conservative party and sat for a time as an independent member. On 20 December that year, he became a founding member of the Bloc Québécois. Chartrand returned to the Progressive Conservatives on 9 April 1991, completed his second term in Parliament before leaving federal politics.

In April 2005, Chartrand and his wife, Carole Lambert, were found guilty of defrauding their boss, Swiss businessman Seymour Jacobson. They were convicted of fraud and conspiracy and sentenced to 18-month prison terms. (La Presse)
