= St. Lawrence—St. George =

Former federal electoral district in Quebec, Canada

Quebec electoral district

Defunct federal electoral district
- Legislature: House of Commons
- District created: 1914
- District abolished: 1967
- First contested: 1917
- Last contested: 1965

St. Lawrence—St. George was a federal electoral district in Montreal, Quebec, Canada, that was represented in the House of Commons of Canada from 6 October 1917 to 29 April 1949, from 30 April 1949 to 12 June 1953, and from 13 June 1953 to 22 April 1968.

This riding was created in 1914 from parts of St. Antoine and St. Lawrence ridings. It was initially defined to consist of St. Lawrence and St. George Wards of the city of Montreal. After 1924, it was defined with reference to various streets of Montreal.

The electoral district was abolished in 1966 when it was redistributed into Saint-Henri, Saint-Jacques and Westmount ridings.

== Members of Parliament ==
This riding elected the following members of parliament:

Parliament	Years	Member	Party
St. Lawrence—St. George; Riding created from St. Antoine and St. Lawrence
13th	1917–1921	Charles Ballantyne	Government (Unionist)
14th	1921–1925	Herbert Meredith Marler	Liberal
15th	1925–1926	Charles Cahan	Conservative
16th	1926–1930	Charles Cahan	Conservative
17th	1930–1930	Charles Cahan	Conservative
17th	1930–1935	Charles Cahan	Conservative
18th	1935–1940	Charles Cahan	Conservative
19th	1940–1945	Brooke Claxton	Liberal
20th	1945–1949	Brooke Claxton	Liberal
21st	1949–1953	Brooke Claxton	Liberal
22nd	1953–1954	Brooke Claxton	Liberal
22nd	1954–1957	Claude Richardson	Liberal
23rd	1957–1958	Claude Richardson	Liberal
24th	1958–1962	Egan Chambers	Progressive Conservative
25th	1962–1963	John Turner	Liberal
26th	1963–1965	John Turner	Liberal
27th	1965–1968	John Turner	Liberal
Riding dissolved into Saint-Henri, Saint-Jacques and Westmount

== Election results ==
1917 Canadian federal election
Party	Candidate	Votes
Government (Unionist)	Charles Ballantyne	5,806
Opposition (Laurier Liberals)	William Clement Munn	2,403

1921 Canadian federal election
Party	Candidate	Votes
Liberal	Herbert Marler	7,836
Conservative	Charles Ballantyne	5,275
Labour	Rose Mary Louise Henderson	510

1925 Canadian federal election
Party	Candidate	Votes
Conservative	Charles Cahan	6,509
Liberal	Hon. Herbert Marler	5,580

1926 Canadian federal election
Party	Candidate	Votes
Conservative	Charles Cahan	5,725
Liberal	William Clement Munn	3,826

1930 Canadian federal election
Party	Candidate	Votes
Conservative	Charles Cahan	6,666
Liberal	Ernest Pitt	3,653

Canadian federal by-election, 25 August 1930
Party	Candidate	Votes
On Cahan's acceptance of an office of emolument under the Crown, 7 August 1930
Conservative	Charles Cahan	acclaimed

1935 Canadian federal election
Party	Candidate	Votes
Conservative	Charles Cahan	6,862
Liberal	Adrian Knatchbull-Hugessen	5,695
Reconstruction	Godefroy Dumont Laviolette	1,461

1940 Canadian federal election
Party	Candidate	Votes
Liberal	Brooke Claxton	11,553
Conservative	Charles Cahan	6,568

1945 Canadian federal election
Party	Candidate	Votes
Liberal	Brooke Claxton	10,301
Progressive Conservative	Frederick Ross Phelan	6,171
Co-operative Commonwealth	Harry Wilks	1,454
Bloc populaire	Marcel Garneau	1,193
Labor–Progressive	Gordon McCutcheon	871
Independent	Alfred Routhier	263

1949 Canadian federal election
Party	Candidate	Votes
Liberal	Brooke Claxton	15,104
Progressive Conservative	Charles Trenholme Ballantyne	5,911
Co-operative Commonwealth	Jeannine Théorêt	1,146

1953 Canadian federal election
Party	Candidate	Votes
Liberal	Brooke Claxton	9,082
Progressive Conservative	David L. De Volpi	4,648
Co-operative Commonwealth	William Dodge	444
Labor–Progressive	Frank Brenton	428

By-election on 8 November 1954 On Claxton's resignation, 31 July 1954
Party	Candidate	Votes
Liberal	Claude Richardson	6,548
Progressive Conservative	David De Volpi	4,489
Co-operative Commonwealth	Albert Renaud	425
Labor–Progressive	Frank Brenton	277

1957 Canadian federal election
Party	Candidate	Votes
Liberal	Claude Richardson	7,758
Progressive Conservative	Egan Chambers	6,219
Co-operative Commonwealth	Norman Mergler	440
Labor–Progressive	Frank Brenton	360

1958 Canadian federal election
Party	Candidate	Votes
Progressive Conservative	Egan Chambers	9,702
Liberal	Claude Richardson	7,132
Co-operative Commonwealth	Norman Mergler	534
Labor–Progressive	Frank Brenton	279

1962 Canadian federal election
Party	Candidate	Votes
Liberal	John Turner	7,227
Progressive Conservative	Egan Chambers	4,969
New Democratic	R. Barry Rutland	1,282
Social Credit	Eugène Caraghiaur	437

1963 Canadian federal election
Party	Candidate	Votes
Liberal	John Turner	8,552
Progressive Conservative	Egan Chambers	3,796
New Democratic	R. Barry Rutland	1,606
Social Credit	Charles Sucsany	708

1965 Canadian federal election
Party	Candidate	Votes
Liberal	John Turner	6,920
Progressive Conservative	Alfred Warkentin	2,648
New Democratic	Frank Auf der Maur	1,676
Ralliement créditiste	Lucien Plante	274

== See also ==
- List of Canadian electoral districts
- Historical federal electoral districts of Canada
