= Verdun (federal electoral district) =

Former federal electoral district in Quebec, Canada

Quebec electoral district

Defunct federal electoral district
- Legislature: House of Commons
- District created: 1933
- District abolished: 2003
- First contested: 1935
- Last contested: 2000

Verdun (also known as Verdun—Saint-Paul, Verdun—Saint-Henri and Verdun—Saint-Henri—Saint-Paul—Pointe-Saint-Charles) was a federal electoral district in Quebec, Canada, that was represented in the House of Commons of Canada from 1935 to 1949 and from 1953 to 2004.

Verdun—La Salle riding, which covered much of the same area, was represented in the House of Commons from 1949 to 1953.

== History ==
The riding was created as "Verdun" riding in 1933 from parts of Jacques Cartier and St. Anne ridings. It was abolished in 1947 when it was redistributed into Jacques Cartier and "Verdun—La Salle" ridings.

Verdun—La Salle riding was created from Verdun riding in 1947, and was abolished in 1952 when it was redistributed into a new Verdun riding and into Jacques-Cartier—Lasalle.

"Verdun" riding was recreated in 1952 from parts of Verdun—La Salle riding. It was renamed "Verdun—Saint-Paul" in 1980, "Verdun—Saint-Henri" in 1996, and "Verdun—Saint-Henri—Saint-Paul—Pointe Saint-Charles" in 2000.

In 2004, the riding was merged into Jeanne-Le Ber riding.

=== Members of Parliament ===
This riding elected the following members of Parliament:

Parliament	Years	Member	Party
Verdun; Riding created from Jacques Cartier and St. Anne
18th	1935–1940	Jules Wermenlinger	Conservative
19th	1940–1945	Paul-Émile Côté	Liberal
20th	1945–1949	Paul-Émile Côté	Liberal
Verdun—La Salle
21st	1949–1953	Paul-Émile Côté	Liberal
Verdun
22nd	1953–1954	Paul-Émile Côté	Liberal
22nd	1954–1957	Yves Leduc	Liberal
23rd	1957–1958	Yves Leduc	Liberal
24th	1958–1962	Harold Monteith	Progressive Conservative
25th	1962–1963	Bryce Mackasey	Liberal
26th	1963–1965	Bryce Mackasey	Liberal
27th	1965–1968	Bryce Mackasey	Liberal
28th	1968–1972	Bryce Mackasey	Liberal
29th	1972–1974	Bryce Mackasey	Liberal
30th	1974–1976	Bryce Mackasey	Liberal
30th	1977–1979	Pierre Savard	Liberal
31st	1979–1980	Pierre Savard	Liberal
Verdun—Saint-Paul
32nd	1980–1984	Pierre Savard	Liberal
33rd	1984–1988	Gilbert Chartrand	Progressive Conservative
34th	1988–1990	Gilbert Chartrand	Progressive Conservative
34th	1990–1990	Gilbert Chartrand	Independent
34th	1990–1991	Gilbert Chartrand	Bloc Québécois
34th	1991–1993	Gilbert Chartrand	Progressive Conservative
35th	1993–1997	Raymond Lavigne	Liberal
Verdun—Saint-Henri
36th	1997–2000	Raymond Lavigne	Liberal
Verdun—Saint-Henri—Saint-Paul—Pointe Saint-Charles
37th	2000–2002	Raymond Lavigne	Liberal
37th	2002–2004	Liza Frulla	Liberal
Riding dissolved into Jeanne-Le Ber

== Election results ==
=== Verdun 1933-1947 ===
1935 Canadian federal election
Party	Candidate	Votes	%
Conservative	Jules Wermenlinger	5,602	22.39%
Co-operative Commonwealth	Georges Stuart Mooney	4,706	18.81%
Verdun	Hervé Ferland	4,214	16.84%
Labour	William "Willie" Lessard	3,833	15.32%
Independent Liberal	Thomas Guérin	2,731	10.91%
Independent Liberal	Casimir Allard	2,065	8.25%
Reconstruction	Camille Dansereau	1,266	5.06%
Independent Conservative	James Albert Whitaker	232	0.93%
Independent Labour	Henry Joseph Garrity	221	0.88%
Veterans	Alloys Reginald Sprenger	79	0.32%
Independent Conservative	Édouard Lamontagne	74	0.30%

1940 Canadian federal election
Party	Candidate	Votes
Liberal	Paul-Émile Côté	8,372
Independent Liberal	Hervé Ferland	7,231
Co-operative Commonwealth	Robert Louis Calder	3,817
National Government	Jules Wermenlinger	3,693
Independent	Ruby Beryl Joan Adams	1,838
Independent	Charles S.P. Halpin	1,181
Independent Conservative	Samuel Currie	814
Independent	Robert William Scurrah	599

1945 Canadian federal election
Party	Candidate	Votes
Liberal	Paul-Émile Côté	15,943
Progressive Conservative	Wilfrid Pagé	7,151
Co-operative Commonwealth	Edward Wilson	6,967
Bloc populaire	Louis-Philippe Hurtubise	3,060
Labor–Progressive	Sam Bailey	874
Independent Liberal	Joseph-Jean-Léopold Comeau	390
Independent Co-operative Commonwealth	Walter Wilson	279
Social Credit	Henri Turcotte	187
Independent Liberal	Donald Mark Elvidge	127
Independent Liberal	Joseph-Madore-Omer Royer	36

=== Verdun—La Salle 1947-1952 ===
1949 Canadian federal election
Party	Candidate	Votes
Liberal	Paul-Émile Côté	24,903
Progressive Conservative	John William Macgillivray	7,790
Co-operative Commonwealth	William Dodge	2,612
Union des électeurs	Donat Fortin	445
Independent	Richard Monahan	83

=== Verdun 1952-1980 ===
1953 Canadian federal election
Party	Candidate	Votes
Liberal	Paul-Émile Côté	20,281
Progressive Conservative	Harold Monteith	7,255
Co-operative Commonwealth	Raymond Lapointe	1,587
Labor–Progressive	Ken Perry	483

By-election on 22 March 1954 On Côté's acceptance of an office of emolument under the Crown, 1 January 1954
Party	Candidate	Votes
Liberal	Yves Leduc	8,221
Progressive Conservative	Armand Dupuis	5,755
Independent Liberal	Roland Gadbois	4,671
Co-operative Commonwealth	William Dodge	2,745
Labor–Progressive	Hervé Ferland	2,180
Independent Liberal	Joseph Michael Hayes	1,322
Independent	Ken Perry	204

1957 Canadian federal election
Party	Candidate	Votes
Liberal	Yves Leduc	18,695
Progressive Conservative	Harold Monteith	9,037
Co-operative Commonwealth	William Dodge	2,299

1958 Canadian federal election
Party	Candidate	Votes
Progressive Conservative	Harold Monteith	16,357
Liberal	Yves Leduc	14,604
Co-operative Commonwealth	William Dodge	2,205
Independent Liberal	J.-O.-Rolland Leduc	1,901
Social Credit	Édouard Provencher	264

1962 Canadian federal election
Party	Candidate	Votes
Liberal	Bryce Mackasey	13,860
Progressive Conservative	Harold Monteith	11,489
New Democratic	Irénée Blais	3,430
Independent Liberal	William-Léonard Poitras	3,208
Social Credit	P.-Raymond Leclerc	1,032
Independent PC	Carl-B. O'Malley	881

1963 Canadian federal election
Party	Candidate	Votes
Liberal	Bryce Mackasey	19,473
Progressive Conservative	Bernard Rhéaume	7,488
Social Credit	Carl B. O'Malley	4,412
New Democratic	Douglas Findlay	3,380

1965 Canadian federal election
Party	Candidate	Votes
Liberal	Bryce Mackasey	18,072
Progressive Conservative	Bernard Rhéaume	6,213
New Democratic	Wesley Robert Dillen	4,113
Ralliement créditiste	René Lassonde	2,094

1968 Canadian federal election
Party	Candidate	Votes
Liberal	Bryce Mackasey	22,436
Progressive Conservative	Claude De Serres	3,410
New Democratic	Matt Craig	2,813
Ralliement créditiste	Eugène Lépine	1,004

1972 Canadian federal election
Party	Candidate	Votes
Liberal	Bryce Mackasey	20,943
Progressive Conservative	Eddy Vigneau	7,626
Social Credit	Eugène Lépine	3,323
New Democratic	Gus Callaghan	2,518
Independent	Paul Lévesque	239

1974 Canadian federal election
Party	Candidate	Votes
Liberal	Bryce Mackasey	17,633
Progressive Conservative	Eddy Vigneau	7,922
New Democratic	Philippe Morse	2,232
Social Credit	Lucien Laroche	1,774
Marxist–Leninist	Arnold August	199

By-election on 24 May 1977 On Mackasey's resignation, 28 October 1976
Party	Candidate	Votes
Liberal	Pierre Savard	15,208
New Democratic	Phil Edmonston	8,151
Progressive Conservative	Pierrette Lucas	2,003
Social Credit	Michel Dansereau	173
Communist	Samuel J. Walsh	97
Independent	Louise Ouimet	78

1979 Canadian federal election
Party	Candidate	Votes
Liberal	Pierre Savard	30,178
Progressive Conservative	John Oss	4,908
Social Credit	Lucien Marien	2,301
New Democratic	Denis Faubert	2,299
Rhinoceros	Catherine Messier	905
Union populaire	Raymond Marchessault	801
Libertarian	Mary Lou Gutscher	182
Communist	Denis Gervais	139
Marxist–Leninist	Mary Saul	59

1980 Canadian federal election
Party	Candidate	Votes
Liberal	Pierre Savard	27,575
New Democratic	David Garon	3,635
Progressive Conservative	Jocelyn Giroux	3,423
Rhinoceros	Ronald Cawthorn	1,141
Social Credit	Lucien Marien	599
Union populaire	Jean-Claude Bonin	155
Marxist–Leninist	Mary Saul	80

=== Verdun—Saint-Paul 1981-1997 ===
1984 Canadian federal election
Party	Candidate	Votes
Progressive Conservative	Gilbert Chartrand	17,378
Liberal	Pierre Savard	16,431
New Democratic	Alain Giguère	3,912
Rhinoceros	Philippe Hooligan Coté	1,309
Parti nationaliste	Serge Paquette	798
Commonwealth of Canada	Steve Boyle	99

1988 Canadian federal election
Party	Candidate	Votes
Progressive Conservative	Gilbert Chartrand	20,113
Liberal	Raymond Lavigne	15,207
New Democratic	Alain Tassé	6,572
Green	Jan-Marc Lavergne	1,339
Rhinoceros	Irène Maman Mayer	902
Commonwealth of Canada	Claude Brosseau	142
Independent	Yvon Turgeon	105

1993 Canadian federal election: Verdun—Saint-Paul
Party	Candidate	Votes	%	±%	Expenditures
Liberal	Raymond Lavigne	19,644	43.69	–	$36,451
Bloc Québécois	Kim Beaudoin	19,095	42.47		$35,583
Progressive Conservative	André Martin	3,864	8.59		$51,508
New Democratic Party	Claude Ledoux	860	1.91		$0
Green	Jean-Marc Beaudin	598	1.33		$1
Natural Law	Marylise Baux	432	0.96		$408
Abolitionist	Yvan Cousineau	140	0.31		$0
National	J.J. McPherson	130	0.29		$466
Non-affiliated	Deepak Massand	115	0.26		$6,744
Commonwealth	Golam Khan	88	0.20		$0
Total valid votes		44,966	100.00		
Total rejected ballots		1,720			
Turnout		46,686	75.50		
Electors on the lists		61,838			
Source: Thirty-fifth General Election, 1993: Official Voting Results, Published by the Chief Electoral Officer of Canada. Financial figures taken from the official contributions and expenses submitted by the candidates, provided by Elections Canada.

=== Verdun—Saint-Henri 1997-2000 ===
1993 federal election redistributed results
Party	Vote	%
Bloc Québécois	20,343	43.43
Liberal	20,059	42.83
Progressive Conservative	3,789	8.09
New Democratic	951	2.03
Others	1,694	3.62

1997 Canadian federal election
Party	Candidate	Votes	%	±%
Liberal	Raymond Lavigne	21,424	46.93	+4.10
Bloc Québécois	Donald Longépée	15,153	33.19	-10.24
Progressive Conservative	Aline Aubut	6,838	14.98	+6.89
New Democratic	Claude Ledoux	1,156	2.53	0.50
Natural Law	Michèle Beausoleil	498	1.09	
Reform	Deepak Massand	380	0.83	
Marxist–Leninist	Geneviève Royer	205	0.45	
Total valid votes		45,654	96.20	
Total rejected ballots		1,803	3.80	+0.09
Turnout		47,457	72.51	-1.81
Registered voters		65,447		
Liberal notional gain from Bloc Québécois		Swing		+7.17

=== Verdun—Saint-Henri—Saint-Paul—Pointe Saint-Charles 2000-2004 ===
2000 Canadian federal election
Party	Candidate	Votes	%	±%
Liberal	Raymond Lavigne	20,905	51.27	+4.34
Bloc Québécois	Pedro Utillano	11,976	29.37	-3.82
Progressive Conservative	Bernard Côté	2,670	6.55	-8.43
Alliance	Jacques Gendron	2,098	5.15	+4.31
New Democratic	Matthew McLauchlin	1,003	2.46	-0.07
Green	Lorraine Ann Craig	933	2.29	
Marijuana	Marc-André Roy	924	2.27	
Communist	Bill Sloan	148	0.36	
Independent	William Lorenson	117	0.29	
Total valid votes		40,774	97.14	
Total rejected ballots		1,200	2.86	-0.94
Turnout		41,974	59.05	-13.46
Registered voters		71,085		
Liberal hold		Swing		+4.08

Canadian federal by-election, May 13, 2002 Appointment of Raymond Lavigne to the Senate
Party	Candidate	Votes	%	±%
Liberal	Liza Frulla	10,897	63.90	+12.63
Bloc Québécois	Sonia Goulet	4,432	25.99	-3.38
Progressive Conservative	Bernard Côté	735	4.31	-2.24
New Democratic	Matthew McLauchlin	635	3.72	+1.26
Alliance	Joe De Santis	241	1.41	-3.73
Independent	Robert Lindblad	113	0.66	
Total valid votes		17,053	98.38	
Total rejected ballots		280	1.62	-1.24
Turnout		17,333	25.45	-33.60
Registered voters		68,115		
Liberal hold		Swing		+8.01

== See also ==
- List of Canadian electoral districts
- Historical federal electoral districts of Canada
