= Brooke Claxton =

Canadian politician

The Honourable Brooke Claxton PC DCM QC
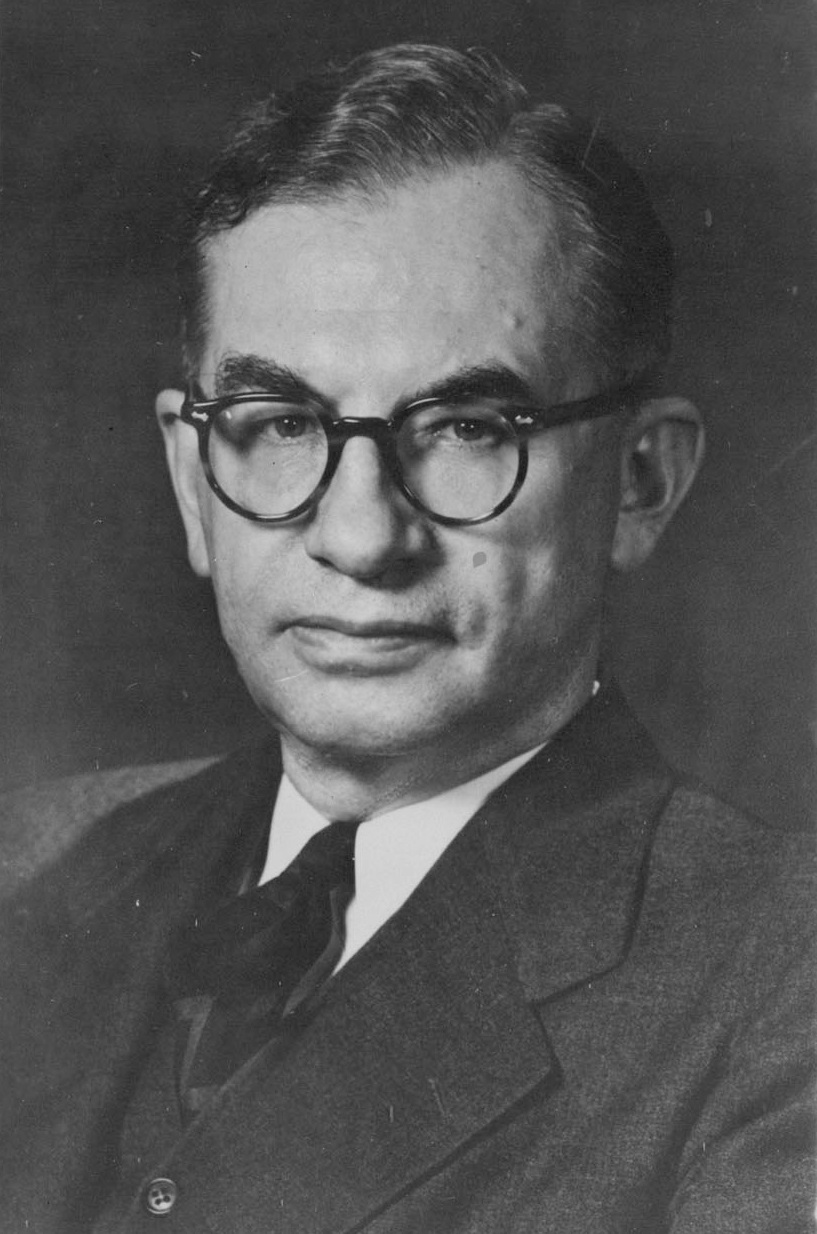

Minister of National Defence
- In office 12 December 1946 – 30 June 1954
- Prime Minister: W. L. Mackenzie King; Louis St. Laurent
- Preceded by: Douglas Abbott
- Succeeded by: Ralph Campney

Minister of National Health and Welfare
- In office 18 October 1944 – 11 December 1946
- Prime Minister: W. L. Mackenzie King
- Preceded by: Ian Alistair Mackenzie
- Succeeded by: Paul Martin, Sr.

Member of Parliament for St. Lawrence--St. George
- In office 26 March 1940 – 31 July 1954
- Preceded by: Charles Cahan
- Succeeded by: Claude Richardson

Personal details
- Born: Brian Brooke Claxton; 23 August 1898 Montreal, Quebec, Canada
- Died: 6 June 1960 (aged 61) Ottawa, Ontario, Canada
- Party: Liberal
- Relations: Andrew Leslie (grandson)
- Profession: Lawyer

Military service
- Allegiance: Canada
- Branch: Canadian Expeditionary Force
- Service years: 1914–1918
- Rank: Battery Sergeant-Major
- Unit: 10th Canadian Siege Battery
- Conflict: World War I; Western Front
- Awards: Distinguished Conduct Medal

Brian Brooke Claxton PC DCM QC (23 August 1898 – 13 June 1960) was a Canadian veteran of World War I, federal Minister of National Health and Welfare and Minister of National Defence.

== Early life ==
He was born in Montreal and received his early education at Lower Canada College. He was a gifted student and entered McGill University in September 1915 after completing grade 11. While at McGill he was a member of the Kappa Alpha Society. After a year at university he left McGill in 1916 and enlisted with the Victoria Rifles of Canada.

== Professional career and achievements ==
He served overseas with the Royal Canadian Field Artillery on the Western Front, and saw action, which experience marked him profoundly. He was promoted to the rank of Battery Sergeant-Major in the field and was awarded the Distinguished Conduct Medal.

Returning to Canada after the War, Claxton completed his course at McGill, graduating with honours in Law. He practised his profession in Montreal. In 1939 he was created a King's Counsel. He had an academic post at McGill where he was associate professor of commercial law until 1944.

Claxton was active in community service. He served as President of the Canadian Club of Montreal, Chairman of the Montreal branch of the Canadian Institute of International Affairs, chairman of the Board of Governors of Lower Canada College from 1925 until 1934, and was a graduate fellow of the Corporation of McGill University. The burgeoning nationalism after World War I led Claxton to become involved in associations such as the Canadian League and the League of Nations Society. He was also an intervenor on behalf of the federal government in the constitutional issue concerning jurisdiction over radio broadcasting. He was active in laying the foundations for the establishment of the Canadian Broadcasting Corporation.

== Political career ==
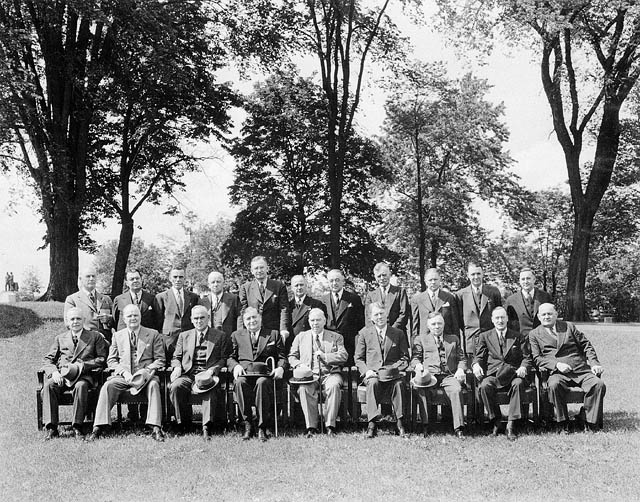
16th Canadian Ministry (Rear, L–R): James Joseph McCann, Paul Martin Sr., Joseph Jean, James Allison Glen, Claxton, Alphonse Fournier, Ernest Bertrand, Andrew McNaughton, Lionel Chevrier, Douglas Abbott, David Laurence MacLaren

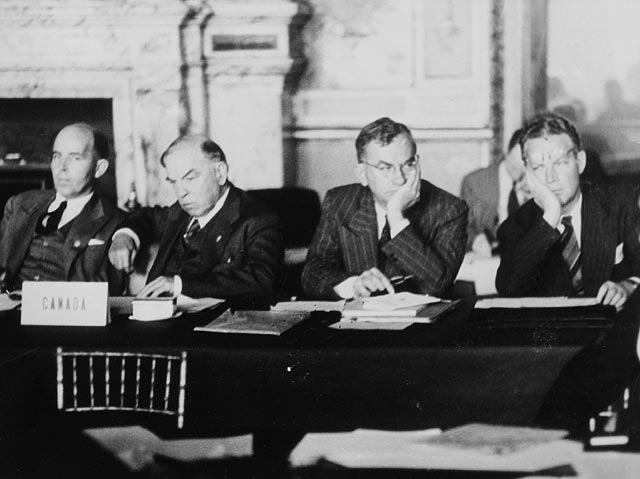
Paris Peace Conference (1947), Palais du Luxembourg (L–R) Norman Robertson, W.L. Mackenzie King, Claxton, Arnold Heeney

His political career began in the general election of 1940 when he was first elected to the House of Commons as Liberal Member for the constituency of St. Lawrence-St. George, Montreal. He was re-elected in 1945 and again in 1949. He was appointed in 1943 as Parliamentary Assistant to the Prime Minister. He served in the federal Liberal cabinets of Mackenzie King and Louis St. Laurent. In 1944 he was named the first Minister of the newly created Department of National Health and Welfare (1944–46). He was responsible for the organization of the department and implementation of the administration system for the universal Family Allowances social welfare scheme. In 1946 Claxton became Minister of National Defence in which portfolio he served until 1954.

In 1947 he headed the Canadian delegation to the British Commonwealth Conference on Japan held in Australia. As vice-chairman of the Cabinet Committee on Newfoundland, in 1949 he signed the terms of union on behalf of Canada. He represented Canada at the meetings of the Defence Committee under the North Atlantic Treaty in Washington, D.C., Paris and The Hague. As Minister of National Defence he guided post-war demobilization, helped shape Canadian Cold War foreign policy, and presided over Canada's participation in the Korean War. In 1947, Claxton reopened RMC as a 3-service cadet college offering a 4-year academic degree. He said, "The role of the officer in modern war can only be properly discharged if they have education and standing in the community comparable to that of any of the other professions as well as high qualities of character and physique."

In 1949 he appointed Rear-Admiral Rollo Mainguy to head a commission of inquiry into the so-called "mutinees" on several navy ships that year. The Mainguy Report found no sign of Communist subversion, and noted that the sailors involved had some justified grievances.

== Family ==
Claxton's brother-in-law was Second Lieutenant Donaldson Lizars Savage who died on 15 November 1916 at the age of 20. Savage was killed in action in Somme, France the same year he graduated from the Royal Military College of Canada. Savage, who served in the 56th Field Coy, Royal Engineers, informed Claxton about the recruiting (hazing) practises then in place at the RMC. As Minister of National Defence, Claxton gave instructions that abuses would not be tolerated when RMC reopened after the war.

== Later life ==
In 1954 he retired from politics, but continued to play an important role in the creation of the Canada Council. He was just sixty-one when he died. At his death in 1960, The Montreal Gazette wrote that the Honourable Brooke Claxton "faced death … with unbreakable courage." He astounded associates by working hard right to the end and "never relaxing his grip."

He was honoured by the University of Saskatchewan with the degree of Doctor of Laws at its Golden Jubilee Convocation in 1959.

The Brooke Claxton Building in Ottawa, where some departments of Health Canada are based, was named in his honour.

== Archives ==
There is a Brooke Claxton fonds at Library and Archives Canada.

== See also ==
- Minister of National Defence (Canada)
