= Paul-Émile Côté =

Canadian politician

Member of Parliament for Verdun
- In office March 1940 – June 1949
- Preceded by: Jules Wermenlinger
- Succeeded by: riding changed

Member of Parliament for Verdun—La Salle
- In office June 1949 – August 1953
- Preceded by: riding changed
- Succeeded by: riding changed

Member of Parliament for Verdun
- In office August 1953 – December 1953
- Preceded by: riding changed
- Succeeded by: Yves Leduc

Personal details
- Born: 9 September 1909 Montreal, Quebec
- Died: 3 June 1970 (aged 60)
- Party: Liberal
- Spouse(s): Laurence Gauthier (m. 4 May 1940)
- Profession: lawyer

Paul-Émile Côté (9 September 1909 – 3 June 1970) was a Liberal party member of the House of Commons of Canada. He was born in Montreal, Quebec and became a lawyer by career.

He was first elected at the Verdun riding in the 1940 general election then re-elected there in 1945. With the riding changed to Verdun—La Salle, he was re-elected again in 1949 and in 1953 when his riding reverted to the Verdun name. Côté resigned his seat at the end of 1953 to accept an appointment as a Quebec Superior Court judge. Yves Leduc, also a Liberal, succeeded Côté at Verdun in a March 1954 by-election.
