= J.-Armand Ménard =

Canadian politician

Mayor of Saint-Jean, Quebec
- In office 1953–1957
- Preceded by: Georges Phaneuf

Member of Parliament for Saint-Jean—Iberville—Napierville
- In office December 1955 – February 1958
- Preceded by: Alcide Côté
- Succeeded by: Yvon Dupuis

Personal details
- Born: 12 July 1905 St-Alexandre-d'Iberville, Quebec, Canada
- Died: 7 October 1973 (aged 68) St. Jean, Quebec, Canada
- Party: Liberal
- Spouse(s): Thérèse Gaudette (m. 2 August 1927)
- Profession: industrialist

J.-Armand Ménard (12 July 1905 – 7 October 1973) was a Liberal party member of the House of Commons of Canada. Born in Saint-Alexandre-d'Iberville, Quebec, he was an industrialist by career.

On 23 February 1953 Ménard was elected mayor of Saint-Jean, Quebec (St. Johns). He had already served as an alderman for the municipal council. He remained mayor until 1957.

Ménard entered federal politics when he won a by-election at the Saint-Jean—Iberville—Napierville on 19 December 1955. He was re-elected in the 1957 federal election and completed his only full federal term, the 23rd Canadian Parliament after which he did not seek re-election in the 1958 election.
