= William Bryce =

Canadian politician (1888–1963)

Scottie Bryce
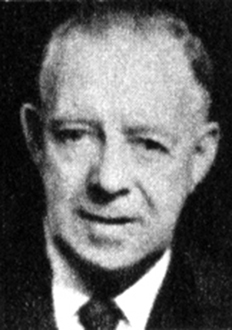
- Bryce in 1957

Member of Parliament for Selkirk
- In office 1943–1953
- Preceded by: Joseph Thorarinn Thorson
- Succeeded by: Robert James Wood
- In office August 1954 – 1957
- Preceded by: Robert James Wood
- Succeeded by: Eric Stefanson

Personal details
- Born: William Bryce; September 7, 1888 Lanark, Scotland
- Died: June 17, 1963 (aged 74) Selkirk, Manitoba
- Party: Manitoba Co-operative Commonwealth Federation
- Profession: farmer, machinist

William "Scottie" Bryce (September 7, 1888 – June 17, 1963) was a politician in Manitoba, Canada. He briefly served as leader of the Manitoba Co-operative Commonwealth Federation (CCF), although he never served in the Legislative Assembly of Manitoba.

== Biography ==
Bryce, born in Lanark, Scotland, was educated at Glasgow, and apprenticed as a machinist. He arrived in Canada in 1919 and farmed in Dugald, Manitoba. From 1941 to 1943, he served as president of the Manitoba Farmers Association. He was also a member of the National War Services Board (1942–43) and the advisory board of Dominion Beef Committee.

Bryce was first elected to the House of Commons of Canada in a 1943 by-election, during a period of increased popularity for the federal CCF. Running in the riding of Selkirk, Bryce defeated his Liberal opponent Charles Fillmore by about 5500 votes. He was re-elected by narrower margins in the general elections of 1945 and 1949. He was a leading advocate for farmer's concerns during his time in parliament, and generally avoided ideological debates.

Bryce's tenure as provincial CCF leader was an anomaly in the party's history. He was chosen leader in 1952 due to concerns that his federal riding would be eliminated by redistribution. As it happened, Bryce decided to stay in federal politics and Lloyd Stinson was chosen provincial leader in 1953. Bryce does not appear to have played a significant role in the operations of the provincial party.

Bryce was defeated by Liberal Robert Wood in the federal election of 1953, but won a by-election after Wood's death the following year. He was re-elected in the 1957 election, but fell to Progressive Conservative Eric Stefanson in John Diefenbaker's landslide victory of 1958.

In the 1959 provincial election, Bryce ran for the CCF in the riding of Selkirk but placed third, receiving only 872 votes out of about 4400 cast. He retired from politics after this.

Bryce died at his Selkirk, Manitoba home in 1963.
