= Yves Leduc =

Canadian politician

Joseph Gérard Yves Leduc

Member of Parliament for Verdun
- In office March 1954 – March 1958
- Preceded by: Paul-Émile Côté
- Succeeded by: Harold Monteith

Personal details
- Born: Joseph Gérard Yves Leduc; 19 September 1908 Montreal, Quebec, Canada
- Died: 1 February 1995 (aged 86) Montreal, Quebec, Canada
- Party: Liberal
- Spouse(s): Marthe-Marie Deschambault (m. 23 Jun 1934)
- Children: Marie, Lucie, François, Benoit
- Profession: Lawyer, professor of law

Joseph Gérard Yves Leduc (19 September 1908 – 1 February 1995) was a Liberal party member of the House of Commons of Canada. Born in Montreal, Quebec, he was a lawyer and professor of law by career.

He was first elected in a by-election at the Verdun riding on 22 March 1954 then elected there for a full term in the 1957 federal election. He was defeated by Harold Monteith of the Progressive Conservative Party in the 1958 election.
