= Alcide Côté =

Canadian politician

Member of the Canadian Parliament for Saint-Jean—Iberville—Napierville
- In office 1945–1955
- Succeeded by: J.-Armand Ménard

Personal details
- Born: May 19, 1903 St-Jean, Quebec, Canada
- Died: August 7, 1955 (aged 52)
- Party: Liberal
- Cabinet: Postmaster General (1952-1955)

Alcide Côté, PC (May 19, 1903 – August 7, 1955) was a Canadian politician and lawyer.

Born in Saint-Jean-sur-Richelieu, Quebec, he was a lawyer before being elected to the House of Commons of Canada for the riding of Saint-Jean—Iberville—Napierville in the 1945 federal election. A Liberal, he was re-elected in 1949 and 1953. From 1952 to 1955, he was the Postmaster General of Canada. He died while in office and had a state funeral.
