= Claude Richardson =

Canadian politician

Claude Sartoris Richardson

Member of Parliament for St. Lawrence—St. George
- In office November 1954 – March 1958

Personal details
- Born: Claude Sartoris Richardson; 11 June 1900 Sydney, Nova Scotia
- Died: 22 February 1969 (aged 68)
- Party: Liberal
- Profession: lawyer

Claude Sartoris Richardson (11 June 1900 – 22 February 1969) was a Liberal party member of the House of Commons of Canada. He was born in Sydney, Nova Scotia and became a lawyer by career.

He was first elected in a by-election at the St. Lawrence—St. George riding on 8 November 1954 then re-elected there for a full term in the 1957 federal election. Richardson was defeated in the 1958 election by Egan Chambers of the Progressive Conservative party.
