= Norquay (electoral district) =

Former federal electoral district in Manitoba, Canada

Norquay was a federal electoral district in Manitoba, Canada, that was represented in the House of Commons of Canada from 1949 to 1953.

This riding was created in 1947 from parts of Portage la Prairie, Selkirk and Springfield ridings. It was abolished in 1952 when it was redistributed into Dauphin, Portage—Neepawa and Selkirk ridings.

== Election results ==
1949 Canadian federal election
Party	Candidate	Votes
Liberal	WOOD, Robert James	8,430
Co-operative Commonwealth	PETURSSON, Philip M.	4,776
Progressive Conservative	KOSHOWSKI, Walter	807

== See also ==
- List of Canadian electoral districts
- Historical federal electoral districts of Canada
