= List of members of the Canadian House of Commons (T) =

== Ta ==
- Marwan Tabbara b. 1984 first elected in 2015 as Liberal member for Kitchener South—Hespeler, Ontario.
- Onésiphore Ernest Talbot b. 1854 first elected in 1896 as Liberal member for Bellechasse, Quebec.
- Peter Talbot b. 1854 first elected in 1904 as Liberal member for Strathcona, Northwest Territories.
- Geng Tan b. 1963 first elected in 2015 as Liberal member for Don Valley North, Ontario.
- Alain Tardif b. 1946 first elected in 1979 as Liberal member for Richmond, Quebec.
- Monique Tardif b. 1936 first elected in 1984 as Progressive Conservative member for Charlesbourg, Quebec.
- Paul Tardif b. 1910 first elected in 1959 as Liberal member for Russell, Ontario.
- Joseph Israël Tarte b. 1848 first elected in 1891 as Conservative member for Montmorency, Quebec.
- Henri Thomas Taschereau b. 1841 first elected in 1872 as Liberal member for Montmagny, Quebec.
- Thomas Linière Taschereau b. 1850 first elected in 1884 as Conservative member for Beauce, Quebec.
- Joseph Tassé b. 1848 first elected in 1878 as Conservative member for City of Ottawa, Ontario.
- Yvon-Roma Tassé b. 1910 first elected in 1958 as Progressive Conservative member for Quebec East, Quebec.
- Filomena Tassi b. 1962 first elected in 2015 as Liberal member for Hamilton West—Ancaster—Dundas, Ontario.
- Charles Keith Taylor b. 1931 first elected in 1972 as Progressive Conservative member for Churchill, Manitoba.
- Don L. Taylor b. 1931 first elected in 1979 as Progressive Conservative member for Cowichan—Malahat—The Islands, British Columbia.
- George Taylor b. 1840 first elected in 1882 as Conservative member for Leeds South, Ontario.
- Gordon Edward Taylor b. 1910 first elected in 1979 as Progressive Conservative member for Bow River, Alberta.
- James Davis Taylor b. 1863 first elected in 1908 as Conservative member for New Westminster, British Columbia.
- James Samuel Taylor b. 1872 first elected in 1935 as Cooperative Commonwealth Federation member for Nanaimo, British Columbia.
- John Russell Taylor b. 1917 first elected in 1957 as Progressive Conservative member for Vancouver—Burrard, British Columbia.
- Leonard William Taylor b. 1952 first elected in 1988 as New Democratic Party member for The Battlefords—Meadow Lake, Saskatchewan.
- William Horace Taylor b. 1889 first elected in 1926 as Liberal member for Norfolk—Elgin, Ontario.
- Leah Taylor Roy first elected in 2021 as Liberal member for Aurora—Oak Ridges—Richmond Hill, Ontario.

== Te ==
- Roger-Joseph Teillet b. 1912 first elected in 1962 as Liberal member for St. Boniface, Manitoba.
- Andrew Telegdi b. 1946 first elected in 1993 as Liberal member for Waterloo, Ontario.
- William Pattison Telford, Sr. b. 1836 first elected in 1904 as Liberal member for Grey North, Ontario.
- William Pattison Telford, Jr. b. 1867 first elected in 1926 as Liberal member for Grey North, Ontario.
- Louis Tellier b. 1842 first elected in 1878 as Conservative member for St. Hyacinthe, Quebec.
- Lui Temelkovski b. 1954 first elected in 2004 as Liberal member for Oak Ridges—Markham, Ontario.
- Anthony Robert Temple b. 1926 first elected in 1963 as Liberal member for Hastings South, Ontario.
- Thomas Temple b. 1818 first elected in 1884 as Conservative member for York, New Brunswick.
- William Templeman b. 1842 first elected in 1906 as Liberal member for Victoria City, British Columbia.
- Anna Marina Terrana b. 1937 first elected in 1993 as Liberal member for Vancouver East, British Columbia.
- Kristina Tesser Derksen first elected in 2025 as Liberal member for Milton East—Halton Hills South, Ontario.
- Claude Tessier b. 1943 first elected in 1974 as Liberal member for Compton, Quebec.
- Oza Tétrault b. 1908 first elected in 1968 as Ralliement Créditiste member for Villeneuve, Quebec.
- J.-Eugène Tétreault b. 1884 first elected in 1930 as Conservative member for Shefford, Quebec.
- Jacques Tétreault b. 1929 first elected in 1988 as Progressive Conservative member for Laval-des-Rapides, Quebec.

== Tha–Thi ==
- Blaine Thacker b. 1941 first elected in 1979 as Progressive Conservative member for Lethbridge—Foothills, Alberta.
- Peter Thalheimer b. 1936 first elected in 1993 as Liberal member for Timmins—Chapleau, Ontario.
- Ross Thatcher b. 1917 first elected in 1945 as Cooperative Commonwealth Federation member for Moose Jaw, Saskatchewan.
- Joseph Thauvette b. 1876 first elected in 1930 as Liberal member for Vaudreuil—Soulanges, Quebec.
- Luc Thériault b. 1960 first elected in 2015 as Bloc Québécois member for Montcalm, Quebec.
- Olaüs Thérien b. 1860 first elected in 1887 as Conservative member for Montcalm, Quebec.
- Alain Therrien b. 1966 first elected in 2019 as Bloc Québécois member for La Prairie, Quebec.
- Ève-Mary Thaï Thi Lac b. 1972 first elected in 2007 as Bloc Québécois member for Saint-Hyacinthe—Bagot, Quebec.
- Isidore Thibaudeau b. 1819 first elected in 1874 as Liberal member for Quebec East, Quebec.
- Léandre Thibault b. 1899 first elected in 1953 as Liberal member for Matapédia—Matane, Quebec.
- Louise Thibault b. 1947 first elected in 2004 as Bloc Québécois member for Rimouski-Neigette—Témiscouata—Les Basques, Quebec.
- Robert Thibault b. 1959 first elected in 2000 as Liberal member for West Nova, Nova Scotia.
- Glenn Thibeault b. 1969 first elected in 2008 as New Democratic member for Sudbury, Ontario.
- Yolande Thibeault b. 1939 first elected in 1997 as Liberal member for Saint-Lambert, Quebec.

== Tho–Thu ==
- William Thoburn b. 1847 first elected in 1908 as Conservative member for Lanark North, Ontario.
- Charles Humbert Thomas b. 1915 first elected in 1968 as Progressive Conservative member for Moncton, New Brunswick.
- J. Antonio Thomas b. 1912 first elected in 1965 as Liberal member for Maisonneuve—Rosemont, Quebec.
- Ray Thomas b. 1917 first elected in 1949 as Social Credit member for Wetaskiwin, Alberta.
- William Howell Arthur Thomas b. 1895 first elected in 1957 as Progressive Conservative member for Middlesex West, Ontario.
- Alfred Thompson b. 1869 first elected in 1904 as Conservative member for Yukon, Yukon.
- Alfred Burke Thompson b. 1862 first elected in 1925 as Conservative member for Simcoe East, Ontario.
- Andrew Thorburn Thompson b. 1870 first elected in 1900 as Liberal member for Haldimand and Monck, Ontario.
- Arthur Lisle Thompson b. 1884 first elected in 1939 as Liberal member for Kent, Ontario.
- Benjamin Cope Thompson b. 1924 first elected in 1957 as Progressive Conservative member for Northumberland, Ontario.
- David Thompson b. 1836 first elected in 1867 as Liberal member for Haldimand, Ontario.
- Greg Thompson b. 1947 first elected in 1988 as Progressive Conservative member for Carleton—Charlotte, New Brunswick.
- Joanne Thompson b. 1960 first elected in 2021 as Liberal member for St. John's East, Newfoundland and Labrador.
- John Hall Thompson b. 1810 first elected in 1867 as Liberal member for Ontario North, Ontario.
- John Sparrow David Thompson b. 1844 first elected in 1885 as Liberal-Conservative member for Antigonish, Nova Scotia.
- Joshua Spencer Thompson b. 1828 first elected in 1871 as Liberal-Conservative member for Cariboo District, British Columbia.
- Myron Thompson b. 1936 first elected in 1993 as Reform member for Wild Rose, Alberta.
- Richard Frederick Thompson b. 1873 first elected in 1917 as Unionist member for Weyburn, Saskatchewan.
- Robert Norman Thompson b. 1914 first elected in 1962 as Social Credit member for Red Deer, Alberta.
- Sydney Herbert Thompson b. 1920 first elected in 1957 as Social Credit member for Edmonton—Strathcona, Alberta.
- Thomas Alfred Thompson b. 1868 first elected in 1930 as Conservative member for Lanark, Ontario.
- Thomas Henry Thompson b. 1866 first elected in 1917 as Unionist member for Hastings East, Ontario.
- John William Thomson b. 1928 first elected in 1979 as Progressive Conservative member for Calgary South, Alberta.
- Levi Thomson b. 1855 first elected in 1911 as Liberal member for Qu'Appelle, Saskatchewan.
- Roderick J. Thomson b. 1924 first elected in 1968 as New Democratic Party member for Battleford—Kindersley, Saskatchewan.
- Thomas Inkerman Thomson b. 1855 first elected in 1903 as Conservative member for Grey North, Ontario.
- Walter Thomson b. 1895 first elected in 1949 as Liberal member for Ontario, Ontario.
- William Alexander Thomson b. 1816 first elected in 1872 as Liberal member for Welland, Ontario.
- Scott Thorkelson b. 1958 first elected in 1988 as Progressive Conservative member for Edmonton—Strathcona, Alberta.
- Charles Jonas Thornton b. 1850 first elected in 1900 as Conservative member for Durham West, Ontario.
- Joseph Thorarinn Thorson b. 1889 first elected in 1926 as Liberal member for Winnipeg South Centre, Manitoba.
- Richard Devere Thrasher b. 1922 first elected in 1957 as Progressive Conservative member for Essex South, Ontario.
- John Jabez Thurston b. 1888 first elected in 1921 as Independent member for Victoria, Ontario.

== Ti ==
- Samuel Leonard Tilley b. 1818 first elected in 1867 as Liberal-Conservative member for City of St. John, New Brunswick.
- David Tilson b. 1941 first elected in 2004 as Conservative member for Dufferin—Caledon, Ontario.
- Harold Aberdeen Watson Timmins b. 1896 first elected in 1946 as Progressive Conservative member for Parkdale, Ontario.
- Tony Tirabassi b. 1957 first elected in 2000 as Liberal member for Niagara Centre, Ontario.
- David Tisdale b. 1835 first elected in 1887 as Conservative member for Norfolk South, Ontario.

== To ==
- Brian Vincent Tobin b. 1954 first elected in 1980 as Liberal member for Humber—Port au Port—St. Barbe, Newfoundland and Labrador.
- Edmund William Tobin b. 1865 first elected in 1900 as Liberal member for Richmond—Wolfe, Quebec.
- Stanley Gilbert Tobin b. 1871 first elected in 1925 as Liberal member for Wetaskiwin, Alberta.
- Stephen Tobin b. 1836 first elected in 1872 as Liberal member for Halifax, Nova Scotia.
- Corey Tochor first elected in 2019 as Conservative member for Saskatoon—University, Saskatchewan.
- William Frederick Todd b. 1854 first elected in 1908 as Liberal member for Charlotte, New Brunswick.
- Lawrence Toet b. 1962 first elected in 2011 as Conservative member for Elmwood—Transcona, Manitoba.
- Vic Toews b. 1952 first elected in 2000 as Canadian Alliance member for Provencher, Manitoba.
- Donald Tolmie b. 1923 first elected in 1965 as Liberal member for Welland, Ontario.
- Fraser Tolmie first elected in 2021 as Conservative member for Moose Jaw—Lake Centre—Lanigan, Saskatchewan.
- John Tolmie b. 1845 first elected in 1896 as Liberal member for Bruce West, Ontario.
- Simon Fraser Tolmie b. 1867 first elected in 1917 as Unionist member for Victoria City, British Columbia.
- Edwin Tolton b. 1856 first elected in 1900 as Conservative member for Wellington North, Ontario.
- William Rae Tomlinson b. 1902 first elected in 1935 as Liberal member for Bruce, Ontario.
- Alan Tonks b. 1943 first elected in 2000 as Liberal member for York South—Weston, Ontario.
- Philip Toone b. 1965 first elected in 2011 as New Democratic Party member for Gaspésie—Îles-de-la-Madeleine, Quebec.
- Hunter Tootoo b. 1963 first elected in 2015 as Liberal member for Nunavut.
- Paddy Torsney b. 1962 first elected in 1993 as Liberal member for Burlington, Ontario.
- Albert Frederick Totzke b. 1882 first elected in 1925 as Liberal member for Humboldt, Saskatchewan.
- Robert Toupin b. 1949 first elected in 1984 as Progressive Conservative member for Terrebonne, Quebec.
- Adolphe Guillet dit Tourangeau b. 1831 first elected in 1870 as Conservative member for Quebec East, Quebec.
- Henri Tousignant b. 1937 first elected in 1979 as Liberal member for Témiscamingue, Quebec.
- Gordon Towers b. 1919 first elected in 1972 as Progressive Conservative member for Red Deer, Alberta.
- Frederick William Townley-Smith b. 1887 first elected in 1945 as Cooperative Commonwealth Federation member for North Battleford, Saskatchewan.
- Charles James Townshend b. 1844 first elected in 1884 as Liberal-Conservative member for Cumberland, Nova Scotia.

== Tr ==
- Arthur Trahan b. 1877 first elected in 1917 as Laurier Liberal member for Nicolet, Quebec.
- Owen C. Trainor b. 1894 first elected in 1953 as Progressive Conservative member for Winnipeg South, Manitoba.
- Hadley Brown Tremain b. 1874 first elected in 1911 as Conservative member for Hants, Nova Scotia.
- Barclay Edmund Tremaine b. 1839 first elected in 1875 as Liberal member for Victoria, Nova Scotia.
- Benoît Tremblay b. 1948 first elected in 1988 as Progressive Conservative member for Rosemont, Quebec.
- Jacques Raymond Tremblay b. 1923 first elected in 1967 as Liberal member for Richelieu—Verchères, Quebec.
- Jean-Noël Tremblay b. 1926 first elected in 1958 as Progressive Conservative member for Roberval, Quebec.
- Jonathan Tremblay b. 1984 first elected in 2011 as New Democratic Party member for Montmorency—Charlevoix—Haute-Côte-Nord, Quebec.
- Léonard-David Sweezey Tremblay b. 1896 first elected in 1935 as Liberal member for Dorchester, Quebec.
- Marcel R. Tremblay b. 1943 first elected in 1984 as Progressive Conservative member for Québec-Est, Quebec.
- Maurice Tremblay b. 1944 first elected in 1984 as Progressive Conservative member for Lotbinière, Quebec.
- Pierre Alexis Tremblay b. 1827 first elected in 1867 as Liberal member for Chicoutimi—Saguenay, Quebec.
- René Tremblay b. 1922 first elected in 1963 as Liberal member for Matapédia—Matane, Quebec.
- Stéphan Tremblay b. 1973 first elected in 1996 as Bloc Québécois member for Lac-Saint-Jean, Quebec.
- Suzanne Tremblay b. 1937 first elected in 1993 as Bloc Québécois member for Rimouski—Témiscouata, Quebec.
- Jesse Pickard Tripp b. 1883 first elected in 1940 as Liberal member for Assiniboia, Saskatchewan.
- Bradley Trost b. 1974 first elected in 2004 as Conservative member for Saskatoon—Humboldt, Saskatchewan.
- Bernard Trottier b. 1965 first elected in 2011 as Conservative member for Etobicoke—Lakeshore, Ontario.
- James Trow b. 1825 first elected in 1872 as Liberal member for Perth South, Ontario.
- Reuben Eldridge Truax b. 1847 first elected in 1891 as Liberal member for Bruce East, Ontario.
- Justin Trudeau, b. 1971 first elected in 2008 as Liberal member for Papineau, Quebec.
- Pierre Elliott Trudeau b. 1919 first elected in 1965 as Liberal member for Mount Royal, Quebec.
- Denis Trudel b. 1963 first elected in 2019 as Bloc Québécois member for Longueuil—Saint-Hubert, Quebec.
- Jacques L. Trudel b. 1919 first elected in 1968 as Liberal member for Bourassa, Quebec.
- Karine Trudel first elected in 2015 as New Democratic Party member for Jonquière, Quebec.
- Susan Truppe b. 1959 first elected in 2011 as Conservative member for London North Centre, Ontario.

== Tu ==
- James Roy Tucker b. 1909 first elected in 1958 as Liberal member for Trinity—Conception, Newfoundland and Labrador.
- Joseph John Tucker b. 1832 first elected in 1896 as Liberal member for City and County of St. John, New Brunswick.
- Walter Adam Tucker b. 1899 first elected in 1935 as Liberal member for Rosthern, Saskatchewan.
- James Brockett Tudhope b. 1858 first elected in 1917 as Unionist member for Simcoe East, Ontario.
- William Ernest Tummon b. 1879 first elected in 1925 as Conservative member for Hastings South, Ontario.
- Charles Tupper b. 1821 first elected in 1867 as Conservative member for Cumberland, Nova Scotia.
- Charles Hibbert Tupper b. 1855 first elected in 1882 as Conservative member for Pictou, Nova Scotia.
- William Tupper b. 1933 first elected in 1984 as Progressive Conservative member for Nepean—Carleton, Ontario.
- Georges Turcot b. 1851 first elected in 1887 as Liberal member for Mégantic, Quebec.
- Arthur Joseph Turcotte b. 1850 first elected in 1892 as Conservative member for Montmorency, Quebec.
- Gustave Adolphe Turcotte b. 1848 first elected in 1907 as Liberal member for Nicolet, Quebec.
- Joseph Pierre Turcotte b. 1857 first elected in 1908 as Liberal member for Quebec County, Quebec.
- James Gray Turgeon b. 1879 first elected in 1935 as Liberal member for Cariboo, British Columbia.
- Onésiphore Turgeon b. 1849 first elected in 1900 as Liberal member for Gloucester, New Brunswick.
- Nycole Turmel b. 1942 first elected in 2011 as New Democratic Party member for Hull—Aylmer, Quebec.
- Franklin White Turnbull b. 1881 first elected in 1930 as Conservative member for Regina, Saskatchewan.
- Ryan Turnbull b. 1977 first elected in 2019 as Liberal member for Whitby, Ontario.
- Charles Robert Turner b. 1916 first elected in 1968 as Liberal member for London East, Ontario.
- Garth Turner b. 1949 first elected in 1988 as Progressive Conservative member for Halton—Peel, Ontario.
- John Barry Turner b. 1946 first elected in 1984 as Progressive Conservative member for Ottawa—Carleton, Ontario.
- John Mouat Turner b. 1900 first elected in 1935 as Liberal member for Springfield, Manitoba.
- John Turner b. 1929 first elected in 1962 as Liberal member for St. Lawrence—St. George, Quebec.
- Daniel Turp b. 1955 first elected in 1997 as Bloc Québécois member for Beauharnois—Salaberry, Quebec.
- John Gillanders Turriff b. 1855 first elected in 1904 as Liberal member for Assiniboia East, Northwest Territories.
- George James Tustin b. 1889 first elected in 1935 as Conservative member for Prince Edward—Lennox, Ontario.

== Tw ==
- Merv Tweed b. 1955 first elected in 2004 as Conservative member for Brandon—Souris, Manitoba.
- Thomas Tweedie b. 1871 first elected in 1917 as Unionist member for Calgary West, Alberta.

== Ty ==
- Richard Tyrwhitt b. 1844 first elected in 1882 as Conservative member for Simcoe South, Ontario.
