= Matthew Robert Duncan =

Canadian politician

Member of Parliament for Grey North
- In office December 1921 – September 1926
- Preceded by: William Sora Middlebro
- Succeeded by: William Pattison Telford, Jr.

Personal details
- Born: Matthew Robert Duncan; 8 July 1863 Owen Sound, Canada West
- Died: 23 February 1938 (aged 74)
- Party: Conservative
- Spouse(s): Margaret E. Witherspoon m. 26 April 1899
- Profession: Merchant

Matthew Robert Duncan (8 July 1863 – 23 February 1938) was a Conservative member of the House of Commons of Canada from 1921 to 1926. He was born in Owen Sound, Canada West, was an alderman there for eleven years, and was the city's mayor in 1905 and 1906.

Duncan attended high school at Owen Sound and became president of Owen Sound Cereal Mills Ltd. He was elected to Parliament in the 1921 general election to represent the Grey North riding, and re-elected in 1925. In the 1926 election he was defeated by William Pattison Telford, Jr. of the Liberals.

== Electoral record ==
1908 Canadian federal election: Grey North
Party	Candidate	Votes
Conservative	William Sora Middlebro	2,923
Liberal	William Pattison Telford Sr.	2,777

1911 Canadian federal election: Grey North
Party	Candidate	Votes
Conservative	William Sora Middlebro	3,326
Liberal	Frederick William Harrison	2,974

1917 Canadian federal election: Grey North
Party	Candidate	Votes
Government (Unionist)	William Sora Middlebro	5,815
Opposition (Laurier Liberals)	Arthur Leslie Danard	3,521
