= W. Garfield Case =

Canadian politician (1898-1959)

Wilfrid Garfield Case

Member of Parliament for Grey North
- In office 5 February 1945 – 26 June 1949
- Preceded by: William Pattison Telford, Jr.
- Succeeded by: Colin Emerson Bennett

Personal details
- Born: 23 September 1898 East Gwillimbury Township, Ontario, Canada
- Died: 22 September 1959 (aged 60) Toronto, Ontario, Canada
- Party: Progressive Conservative
- Spouse(s): Velma Stewart, Elda Rowan
- Children: 3
- Occupation: farmer, insurance broker

Wilfrid Garfield Case also known as W. Garfield Case, (23 September 1898 – 22 September 1959), was a Canadian politician who served as a Progressive Conservative Member of Parliament and Mayor of Owen Sound, Ontario. He is best known for his upset victory over Defence Minister General Andrew McNaughton in the Grey North federal by-election held on 5 February 1945.

== Early years ==
Case was raised on a farm in York County and schooled in Aurora, Ontario before attending the Ontario Agricultural College. He enlisted in the Army during World War I but transferred to the Royal Flying Corps. He was discharged after being seriously injured. Before becoming a politician, he worked as a farmer and insurance broker.

== Political career ==
Case was first elected mayor of Owen Sound in 1942 and was re-elected in 1943 and 1944. He also served as president of the Ontario Mayor's Association. He unsuccessfully ran in Grey North in the 1940 federal election as a "National Liberal Progressive" against both the Liberal and Conservative candidates, placing third. He had earlier, in 1930 federal election, been an unsuccessful Liberal candidate in Dufferin—Simcoe and was a former president of the Owen Sound Liberal Association.

== Grey North by-election ==
During World War II the Liberals and Conservative parties agreed not to run candidates against each other in by-elections and to allow whichever party had held the riding before the by-election to run without opposition. This pact was strained in 1942 when William Lyon Mackenzie King's Liberals allegedly backed Joseph Noseworthy of the Co-operative Commonwealth Federation (which had refused to agree to the "truce") in his candidacy against new Conservative leader Arthur Meighen who was attempting to enter the House of Commons via a by-election in York South. Noseworthy upset Meighen in the vote leaving the Tories leaderless.

On 1 November 1944, General McNaughton was appointed to Mackenzie King's cabinet as Minister of Defence replacing James Ralston who had resigned as a result of the Conscription Crisis of 1944. Ralston, who was pro-conscription, had quit because the King government refused to go as far as he wanted in sending conscripts overseas and was also encouraged to quit as he was distrusted in Quebec where conscription was unpopular. McNaughton had been a believer in an all volunteer military and was appointed to replace Ralston but soon found himself under pressure from the government to enact a limited conscription policy.

By constitutional convention, McNaughton, as a minister of the crown, needed to seek a seat in parliament as soon as possible. The sitting Liberal MP, William P. Telford, had been unable to attend sittings of the House of Commons for a year due to illness and was persuaded to resign in order to enable McNaugton to contest a seat in a by-election. The Tories, who had renamed themselves the Progressive Conservative Party of Canada decided to stand Wilfrid Case against McNaughton in the by-election.

In June 1944, Case was nominated as the Progressive Conservative candidate for the projected 1945 federal election and when the incumbent Liberal MP resigned his seat in favour of General McNaughton, the Tories decided to run Case in the by-election after party leader John Bracken decided to not run as a candidate himself.

During the campaign, Case charged that the former Liberal MP had been forced to resign to make way for McNaughton despite the fact that there were several other vacancies in the House of Commons that needed to be filled. He also accused all of his opponents of being outsiders and parachute candidates and used the slogan "Send a Grey North man to Ottawa, not an Ottawa man to Grey North" in order to press the point. However, the principal issue of the campaign was conscription.

The rationale the Conservatives used when deciding to run a candidate against McNaughton was that it had opposed, in the House of Commons, McNaughton's policy of "limited conscription" calling instead for a "full conscription" policy in order to address the shortage of Canadian troops fighting in the war. Thus, the 5 February 1945, by-election became a test of the government's military policy. Case, however, was viewed as a weak candidate and it was thought that McNaughton would easily carry the riding, not having to face the Leader of the Opposition.

Despite calls from some quarters of labour that they should not contest the by-election, the Co-operative Commonwealth Federation also stood a candidate, retired Air Vice-Marshal Albert Earl Godfrey, a World War I flying ace. The CCF shared McNaughton's policy of "limited conscription" thus, arguably, Godfrey acted as a spoiler in the vote.

Case defeated McNaughton in an upset victory, the margin of which was smaller than the number of votes received by the third place CCF candidate.

After his defeat in Grey North, McNaughton attempted to enter the House of Commons from a Saskatchewan riding in the June federal election but was again defeated. He resigned as Minister of Defence in August 1945.

== Later political career ==
Case was re-elected in the 1945 federal election held in June 1945, three months after his by-election victory.

While in Parliament, Case advocated that the position of Governor General of Canada should be filled by individuals from various countries in the British Commonwealth in order to strengthen ties and also advocated improving the status of aboriginal peoples in Canada.

After Progressive Conservative leader John Bracken resigned, Case announced his candidacy for the leadership of the Progressive Conservative party and ran on a policy of abolishing income tax. He withdrew from the race before the convention to support George Drew, who succeeded in winning the party's leadership.

Case remained in the Canadian House of Commons until his defeat in the subsequent 1949 federal election by Liberal Colin Emerson Bennett. He attempted to return in the 1953 federal election but was again defeated in Grey North.

== Death ==
Case was admitted to Toronto's Sunnybrook Military Hospital on 29 July 1959, for psychiatric treatment. He remained a patient until his death on 22 September 1959.

== Electoral record ==
1940 Canadian federal election: Grey North
Party	Candidate	Votes
Liberal	William Pattison Telford Jr.	7,538
National Government	Victor Porteous	5,771
National Liberal Progressive	W. Garfield Case	2,434

On Mr. Telford's resignation, 9 December 1944, to provide a vacancy for A.G.L. McNaughton:

By-election on 5 February 1945
Party	Candidate	Votes
Progressive Conservative	W. Garfield Case	7,333
Liberal	Andrew McNaughton	6,097
Co-operative Commonwealth	Albert Earl Godfrey	3,118

1945 Canadian federal election: Grey North
Party	Candidate	Votes
Progressive Conservative	W. Garfield Case	9,204
Liberal	Findlay MacDonald	7,570
Co-operative Commonwealth	David T. Waddell	1,145
Social Credit	Ron Gostick	250

1949 Canadian federal election: Grey North
Party	Candidate	Votes
Liberal	Colin Emerson Bennett	9,949
Progressive Conservative	W. Garfield Case	7,589
Co-operative Commonwealth	Elgin MacNab	1,354

1953 Canadian federal election: Grey North
Party	Candidate	Votes
Liberal	Colin Emerson Bennett	8,368
Progressive Conservative	W. Garfield Case	7,293
Co-operative Commonwealth	Lorna Ellen Elliott	1,417
Social Credit	Stanley Ross Patterson	342
