= Percy Noble =

Percy Noble may refer to:

- Sir Allan Herbert Percy (1908 1982) Knight, Commander RN, MP
- Sir Percy Noble (Royal Navy officer) (1880–1955), Royal Navy officer
- Percy Verner Noble (1902–1996), Canadian Member of Parliament
