= Unsuccessful attempts to amend the Canadian Constitution =

Since the Constitution of Canada was patriated, in 1982, ten Amendments to the Constitution of Canada have been passed. There have, however, been a number of unsuccessful attempts to amend the Constitution in accordance with its amending formula.

== Property Rights Amendment, 1983 ==
On April 18, 1983, Prime Minister Pierre Trudeau expressed support for entrenching property rights in the Constitution, but only if debate were limited to a single day. The debate became engulfed in partisan tactics and eleven days later the Progressive Conservative Opposition introduced a motion of non-confidence in the House of Commons of Canada that sought to entrench the right to the "enjoyment of property" in the Constitution. Trudeau's government was not prepared to support its own defeat by backing such a motion. In any case, its passing would dissolve the House and prevent the Senate from considering the proposed amendment. On May 2, 1983, the motion was defeated, with 88 votes in favour and 126 opposed.

== Powers of the Senate Amendment, 1984 ==
In 1984, following the election of a Progressive Conservative majority in the House of Commons and the appointment of Brian Mulroney as Prime Minister, the Senate of Canada came under increased scrutiny. Under the Constitution of Canada, senators are appointed by the Governor General on the advice of the Prime Minister, and during his time in office Mulroney's predecessor, Pierre Trudeau, had arranged the appointment of a large number of Senators, giving the Liberals a majority in the upper house. There was a fear that the Senate would block Mulroney's legislation, so an attempt to amend the Constitution was made to limit the powers of the Senate. Under the proposed amendment the Senate would have a suspensive veto of 30 days on money bills and 45 days on all other bills. The proposed amendment secured the support of the majority of the provincial governments, though it was opposed by Quebec and Manitoba. The amendment was introduced into the House of Commons on June 7, 1985, but 19 days later the government of Ontario changed hands, and the new Liberal Premier, David Peterson, refused to support the amendment. Without Ontario's support the amendment could not meet the requirement for support from provinces containing more than 50 per cent of the population, so the amendment died.

== Rights of the Unborn Amendment, 1986–1987 ==
A private member's motion calling for an amendment that would enshrine rights for fetuses in the Charter of Rights and Freedoms, and thus limit the legality of abortion, was introduced in the House of Commons on November 21, 1986 by Gus Mitges, the Progressive Conservative Member of Parliament for Grey—Simcoe.

The motion called on the government to consider the advisability of amending Section 7 of the Charter to include a reference to human fetuses and the unborn, and called on the Governor General to issue a proclamation amending Section 7. The passing of the motion would not have resulted in an amendment to Section 7, as the Constitution's amending formula requires the approval of the House of Commons, the Senate and two-thirds or more of the provincial legislative assemblies representing at least 50 per cent of the national population.

The debate and vote on the motion occurred on June 2, 1987. Doug Lewis, as Parliamentary secretary to Erik Nielsen (the then Deputy Prime Minister and President of the Privy Council), spoke on behalf of the government, stating that the motion was not "the proper way" to initiate a constitutional amendment, and that the government felt it "inappropriate" to amend laws dealing with therapeutic abortions at that time. Lewis did add that the debate on the motion provided "an important airing of views". After a number of other members spoke on both sides of the issue, the motion failed on a vote of 62 to 89.

== Meech Lake Accord, 1987–1990 ==
The Meech Lake Accord was a complex package of proposed amendments designed to address a number of concerns about the Canadian Constitution. Among other things, it proposed granting Quebec "distinct status" within the Canadian federation, and changing the amending formula of the Constitution by requiring unanimous consent of all the provinces for a greater number of amendments. The accord ultimately failed when the Manitoba legislature and the government of Newfoundland refused to assent to it.

== Charlottetown Accord, 1990–1992 ==
Like the Meech Lake Accord, the Charlottetown Accord was a package of proposed amendments designed to address a number of concerns about the Constitution, many of which were similar to those included in Meech Lake. Due to multiple provinces passing legislation requiring constitutional amendments be put to a referendum, the federal government decided to hold a national referendum on the Charlottetown Accord. The referendum was defeated with a majority (54.97%) voting against the Accord.

== Preamble to the Charter, 1999 ==
In 1999, New Democratic Party MP for Burnaby-Douglas, Svend Robinson, presented a petition created by members of Humanist Canada in the House of Commons that the reference to God be struck from the preamble to the Canadian Charter of Rights and Freedoms, citing concerns about Canada's diversity and those Canadians who did not believe in God. The proposal was controversial and the party responded by undermining Robinson's responsibilities and his position in the caucus.

== Senate Abolition Amendment, 2013 ==
In 2013, in the midst of the Canadian Senate expenses scandal, the Legislative Assembly of Saskatchewan passed a motion calling for the abolition of the Senate of Canada, which had been proposed by Premier of Saskatchewan Brad Wall. No other province nor either House of Parliament ever passed concurring resolutions so the amendment died.

== See also ==
- Constitutional history of Canada
