= Colin Emerson Bennett =

Canadian politician and lawyer (1908–1993)

Member of the Canadian Parliament for Grey North
- In office 1949–1957
- Preceded by: Wilfrid Garfield Case
- Succeeded by: Percy Verner Noble

Personal details
- Born: March 5, 1908 Meaford, Ontario, Canada
- Died: April 30, 1993 (aged 85)
- Party: Liberal
- Occupation: lawyer

Colin Emerson Bennett (March 5, 1908 – April 30, 1993) was a Canadian politician and lawyer. He was elected to the House of Commons of Canada in the 1949 election to represent the riding of Grey North. He was re-elected in 1953. During his second term, he was Parliamentary Assistant to the Minister of Veterans Affairs.

Born in Meaford, Ontario, Bennett was a member of the Royal Canadian Air Force as group captain between 1941 and 1945.

1949 Canadian federal election: Grey North
Party	Candidate	Votes
Liberal	Colin Emerson Bennett	9,949
Progressive Conservative	W. Garfield Case	7,589
Co-operative Commonwealth	Elgin MacNab	1,354

1953 Canadian federal election: Grey North
Party	Candidate	Votes
Liberal	Colin Emerson Bennett	8,368
Progressive Conservative	W. Garfield Case	7,293
Co-operative Commonwealth	Lorna Ellen Elliott	1,417
Social Credit	Stanley Ross Patterson	342
