= William Boucher =

William Boucher may refer to:

- Billy Boucher (1899–1958), Canadian hockey player
- William Albert Boucher (1889–1976), Canadian parliamentarian from Saskatchewan
