= Walter Tucker (Canadian politician) =

Canadian lawyer, politician and judge

Walter Tucker QC

Member of Parliament for Rosthern
- In office 10 August 1953 – 30 March 1958
- Preceded by: William Albert Boucher
- Succeeded by: Edward Nasserden
- In office 14 October 1935 – 7 June 1948
- Preceded by: District created
- Succeeded by: William Albert Boucher

Leader of the Opposition in Saskatchewan
- In office 6 August 1948 – July 1953
- Preceded by: William John Patterson
- Succeeded by: Asmundur Loptson (interim)

MLA for Rosthern
- In office 24 June 1948 – July 1953
- Preceded by: Peter J. Hooge
- Succeeded by: Isaak Elias

Personal details
- Born: Walter Adam Tucker; 11 March 1899 Portage la Prairie, Manitoba, Canada
- Died: 19 September 1990 (aged 91) Saskatoon, Saskatchewan, Canada
- Party: Liberal
- Spouse: Hertha Louise Friesen (m. 1929; died 1988)
- Children: 9
- Education: University of Manitoba (BA); University of Saskatchewan (LLB)
- Profession: Lawyer

Walter Adam Tucker QC (11 March 1899 – 19 September 1990) was a Canadian politician.

Born in Portage la Prairie, Manitoba, Tucker earned his BA from the University of Manitoba and a law degree from the University of Saskatchewan.

He won a seat in the House of Commons of Canada where he was a Liberal MP for Rosthern, Saskatchewan from 1935 until 1948. He served as parliamentary assistant to the Minister of Veterans Affairs from 1945 to 1948.

He moved to provincial politics to lead the Saskatchewan Liberal Party in the 1948 provincial election against the CCF government of Tommy Douglas promoting the Liberals as the defenders of capitalism against the socialist CCF. While Tucker was able to win a seat in the provincial legislature and become Leader of the Opposition, he failed in his attempts to defeat the CCF government in 1948 and then again in 1952. He resigned his seat in the provincial legislature in 1953; replaced in a byelection by Samuel Henry Carr; and returned to the federal House of Commons in the 1953 federal election. He was re-elected in the 1957 election but defeated in the Diefenbaker landslide the following year in the 1958 election.

In 1963, he was appointed to the Court of Queen's Bench for Saskatchewan where he served as a judge until 1974.

His daughter, Shirley Tucker Parks, Q.C. (1930–2010), qualified as a lawyer in Saskatchewan in 1955, one of very few women in Canada to so qualify at that time. During a career that spanned positions at the Canada Mortgage and Housing Corporation, the Department of Justice (Canada), Indian and Northern Affairs Canada and Health Canada, Shirley Parks was notable as a tireless advocate of the furtherance of the legal rights of women.
