= John Michael Uhrich =

Canadian politician

The Honourable John Michael Uhrich
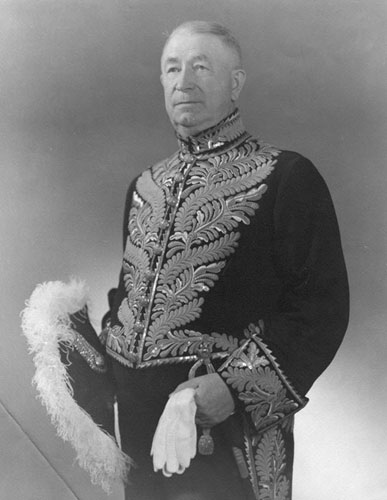
- John Michael Uhrich during his time as Lieutenant Governor of Saskatchewan

9th Lieutenant Governor of Saskatchewan
- In office March 23, 1948 – June 15, 1951
- Monarch: George V
- Governor General: The Viscount Alexander of Tunis
- Premier: Tommy Douglas
- Preceded by: Reginald John Marsden Parker
- Succeeded by: William John Patterson

Member of the Legislative Assembly of Saskatchewan for Rosthern
- In office June 9, 1921 – June 15, 1944
- Preceded by: William Bashford
- Succeeded by: Peter J. Hooge

Personal details
- Born: June 7, 1877 Formosa, Ontario
- Died: June 15, 1951 (aged 74) Regina, Saskatchewan, Canada
- Party: Liberal
- Education: Northwestern University
- Occupation: Physician, teacher
- Profession: Politician

John Michael Uhrich (June 7, 1877 – June 15, 1951), was the ninth lieutenant governor of Saskatchewan from 1948 until 1951.

== Early life ==
Uhrich was born in Formosa, Ontario and received his schooling in Walkerton and was briefly a schoolteacher before earning his medical degree at Northwestern University in Chicago.

During his summer breaks from university he would teach school in Saskatchewan. After graduation, he decided to settle in the province and established his medical practice at Hague, Saskatchewan in 1909.

== Politics ==
He entered politics and was elected to the Legislative Assembly of Saskatchewan in the 1921 provincial election as the Liberal MLA for Rosthern.

Uhrich was appointed to the provincial cabinet in 1922 by Premier Charles Dunning and served as provincial secretary until 1923 when he was appointed the province's first Minister of Public Health. Under Uhrich the province expanded its role in the hospital system, which had been largely locally run to that point, and increased the number of hospitals. He also began public inspection of water and milk supplies and immunization programs against diphtheria and smallpox. In 1929, the government assumed the cost of treating tuberculosis.

After being re-elected in the 1925 provincial election the Liberal government was defeated in 1929 and Uhrich, who was personally re-elected, moved to the opposition benches.

The Liberals returned to power in 1934 and Uhrich again became Minister of Public Health. In 1938, he was given the additional portfolio of Public Works.

== Later life ==
He retired from politics in 1944 and was appointed lieutenant governor in 1948. He died, in office, in 1951.
