= Samuel Henry Carr =

Canadian politician

MLA for Rosthern
- In office October 28, 1953 – May 8, 1956
- Preceded by: Walter Tucker
- Succeeded by: Isaak Elias

Personal details
- Party: Saskatchewan Liberal Party

Samuel Henry Carr was a Canadian politician who represented Rosthern in the 12th sitting of the Legislative Assembly of Saskatchewan.

He won a byelection triggered by the resignation of Walter Tucker.
