= Samuel Johnathan Lane =

Canadian politician (1830–1891)

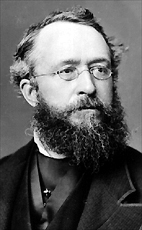
Samuel Johnathan Lane Source: Library and Archives Canada

Samuel Johnathan Lane (1830 – January 28, 1891) was an English-born barrister and political figure in Ontario, Canada. He represented Grey North in the House of Commons of Canada from 1878 to 1882 as a Liberal-Conservative member.

Lane served as a member of the council for Grey County in 1874 and from 1865 to 1872, serving as county warden from 1868 to 1870 and in 1872. He also served as reeve and mayor for Owen Sound. Lane was an unsuccessful candidate in Grey North in the 1874 federal election, losing to George Snider. He defeated Snider in the next general election held in 1878. Lane was defeated by Benjamin Allen when he ran for reelection in 1882. He was named junior judge for the county in 1885 and senior judge in 1889.

== Electoral record ==
1874 Canadian federal election: Grey North
Party	Candidate	Votes
Liberal	George Snider	1,320
Unknown	Samuel Johnathan Lane	1,241

1878 Canadian federal election: Grey North
Party	Candidate	Votes
Conservative	Samuel Johnathan Lane	1,607
Liberal	George Snider	1,394

1882 Canadian federal election: Grey North
Party	Candidate	Votes
Liberal	Benjamin Allen	1,457
Unknown	Samuel Johnathan Lane	1,385
