= William Neudorf =

Canadian politician

William Z. Neudorf (January 1, 1940 – May 5, 1999) was a farmer and former political figure in Saskatchewan. He represented Rosthern from 1986 to 1995 in the Legislative Assembly of Saskatchewan as a Progressive Conservative.

He was born in Hague, Saskatchewan, the son of William Neudorf, and was educated at the University of Saskatchewan. In 1964, Neudorf married Alma Sawatzky. He served in the Saskatchewan cabinet as Minister of Social Services from 1989 to 1991. Neudorf also served as opposition house leader in the provincial assembly.
