= James Masson =

Canadian politician

James Masson, QC (17 February 1847 – 24 December 1903) was a lawyer and political figure in Ontario. He represented Grey North in the House of Commons of Canada from 1887 to 1896 as a Conservative member.

He was born in Seymour Township, Canada West, the son of Thomas W.S. Masson, and educated there and in Belleville. Masson articled in law with William Hamilton Ponton, was called to the Ontario bar in 1871 and set up practice in Owen Sound. In 1878, he married Jessie Morrison. Masson served as Master in Chancery at Owen Sound from 1873 to 1885. He was first elected to the House of Commons in the 1887 federal election, defeating the incumbent Benjamin Allen, and was reelected in 1891. He was named Queen's Counsel in 1885.

1887 Canadian federal election: Grey North
Party	Candidate	Votes
Conservative	James Masson	2,128
Liberal	Benjamin Allen	2,071

1891 Canadian federal election: Grey North
Party	Candidate	Votes
Conservative	James Masson	2,511
Liberal	Edward Henry Horsey	2,264
