= William Pattison Telford Jr. =

Canadian politician

William Pattison Telford

Member of Parliament for Grey North
- In office September 1926 – July 1930
- Preceded by: Matthew Robert Duncan
- Succeeded by: Victor Clarence Porteous

Member of Parliament for Grey North
- In office October 1935 – December 1944
- Preceded by: Victor Clarence Porteous
- Succeeded by: W. Garfield Case

Personal details
- Born: William Pattison Telford; 26 November 1867 Sydenham, Ontario, Canada
- Died: 13 March 1955 (aged 87)
- Party: Liberal
- Profession: lawyer

William Pattison Telford (26 November 1867 – 13 March 1955) was a Liberal party member of the House of Commons of Canada. He was born in Sydenham, Ontario and became a lawyer. His father was William Pattison Telford Sr., another member of Parliament.

From 1901 to 1903, Telford served as a municipal councillor for Owen Sound.

He was first elected to Parliament at the Grey North riding in the 1926 general election after an earlier unsuccessful campaign there in 1921. He was defeated by Victor Clarence Porteous of the Conservatives in the 1930 election. Telford won the riding back from Porteous in the 1935 election, and was elected again in 1940. Telford resigned on 9 December 1944 to provide an available riding for fellow Liberal Andrew McNaughton to seek election, but McNaughton lost the resulting by-election to Conservative candidate W. Garfield Case.

== Electoral record ==
1926 Canadian federal election: Grey North
Party	Candidate	Votes
Liberal	William Pattison Telford Jr.	7,606
Conservative	Matthew Robert Duncan	7,042

1930 Canadian federal election: Grey North
Party	Candidate	Votes
Conservative	Victor Porteous	7,617
Liberal	William Pattison Telford Jr.	7,430

1935 Canadian federal election: Grey North
Party	Candidate	Votes
Liberal	William Pattison Telford Jr.	8,060
Conservative	Victor Porteous	6,740
Reconstruction	William Lawrence Taylor	1,792
Co-operative Commonwealth	Hudson Stout	1,221

1940 Canadian federal election: Grey North
Party	Candidate	Votes
Liberal	William Pattison Telford Jr.	7,538
National Government	Victor Porteous	5,771
National Liberal Progressive	W. Garfield Case	2,434
