= Benjamin Allen (Canadian politician) =

Canadian politician

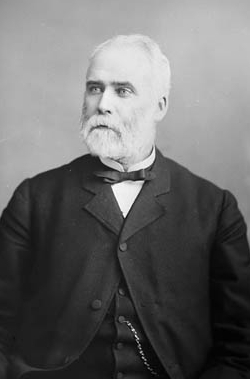
- Chapleau, c. 1883

Member of Parliament for Grey North (1882-1887)
- In office 1882–1887
- Preceded by: Samuel J. Lane
- Succeeded by: James Masson

Personal details
- Born: 1830 Sligo, Ireland
- Died: 23 December 1912 (aged 81–82)
- Party: Liberal
- Profession: Retail Merchant

Benjamin Allen (1830 – 23 December 1912) was a Canadian politician and retail merchant.

Born in Sligo, Ireland, the son of William Allen who was of English descent, Allen first came to Canada in 1850. He went to Australia in 1852, returning to Canada West in 1856, and settled in Owen Sound. In 1857, he married May Cruthers. Allen served as a member of the town council for Owen Sound and was license commissioner from 1876 to 1882. He was elected in 1882 to the House of Commons of Canada as a member of the Liberal Party representing the riding of Grey North.

1882 Canadian federal election: Grey North
Party	Candidate	Votes
Liberal	Benjamin Allen	1,457
Unknown	Samuel Johnathan Lane	1,385

1887 Canadian federal election: Grey North
Party	Candidate	Votes
Conservative	James Masson	2,128
Liberal	Benjamin Allen	2,071
