= George Snider (politician) =

Canadian politician

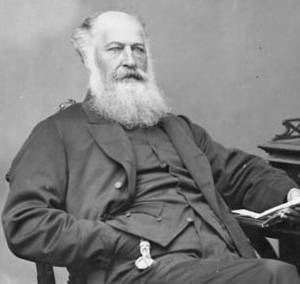
George Snider Source: Library and Archives Canada

George Snider (January 31, 1813 – June 23, 1885) was a Canadian official and political figure in Ontario. He represented Grey North in the House of Commons of Canada as a Liberal member from 1867 to 1878.

He was born in Eglinton, Upper Canada in 1813, the son of Martin Snider, a United Empire Loyalist of German descent, and educated in Toronto. He was the agent for the sale of Crown Lands on the Toronto and Sydenham (later Owen Sound) Road from 1848 to 1854. He served as the first sheriff for Grey County from 1853 to 1863. In 1863, he was an unsuccessful candidate for a seat in the assembly for the Province of Canada. Snider was also mayor of Owen Sound.

In 1835, Snider married Jean Maughan. He died in Owen Sound at the age of 72.

1867 Canadian federal election: Grey North
Party	Candidate	Votes
Liberal	George Snider	1,399
Unknown	D'Arcy Boulton	1,143
Eligible voters		3,478
Source: Canadian Parliamentary Guide, 1871

1872 Canadian federal election: Grey North
Party	Candidate	Votes
Liberal	George Snider	1,124
Unknown	J. Chisholm	983
Source: Canadian Elections Database

1874 Canadian federal election: Grey North
Party	Candidate	Votes
Liberal	George Snider	1,320
Unknown	Samuel Johnathan Lane	1,241

1878 Canadian federal election: Grey North
Party	Candidate	Votes
Conservative	Samuel Johnathan Lane	1,607
Liberal	George Snider	1,394

Parliament of Canada
Preceded by The electoral district was created by the British North America Act, 1867.	Member of Parliament for Grey North; 1867–1878	Succeeded by Samuel Johnathan Lane
