= Edward Henry Horsey =

Canadian politician

Edward Henry Horsey, M.D. (March 7, 1867 – July 23, 1902) was a Canadian physician, businessman and politician.

Born in Ottawa, the son of Henry Hodge Horsey and Amey Ann Rose, Horsey was a graduate of Queen's University where he studied medicine. After working for several years as a physician, he joined the Sun Life Insurance Company becoming their manager for Asia. He then went into business on his own in Owen Sound, Ontario.

In 1890, Horsey married Leila Ada Macdonald.

Horsey entered politics in the 1891 federal election when he contested the riding of Grey North as the Liberal candidate losing by 300 votes. He ran again in the 1900 election and won by a margin of 19 votes.

Horsey was killed in an industrial accident. A metal fragment from a burst flywheel struck him in the head and fractured his skull while he was visiting a cement factory that he owned. He was the founder and chief shareholder of the Sun Portland Cement Works where the accident occurred.

His brother Henry Herbert served in the Canadian Senate.

1891 Canadian federal election: Grey North
Party	Candidate	Votes
Conservative	James Masson	2,511
Liberal	Edward Henry Horsey	2,264

Parliament of Canada
Preceded by William Paterson	Member of Parliament for Grey North; 1900–1902	Succeeded by Thomas Inkerman Thomson
