= Rosthern (provincial electoral district) =

Former provincial electoral district in Saskatchewan, Canada

Rosthern was a constituency of the Legislative Assembly of Saskatchewan from 1971 to 2003. The area covered by the district is now part of Rosthern-Shellbrook and Martensville-Warman.

== Geography ==
The riding was based around the town of Rosthern, Saskatchewan.

== Representation ==
- John Michael Uhrich (1921 to 1944)
- Peter J. Hooge
- Walter Tucker (1948, 1952)
- Samuel Henry Carr (1953 to 1958)
- Isaak Elias (1956 to 1960)
- William Neudorf (1986 to 1995)

Legislature	Years	Member	Party
15th	1965–1967	David Boldt	Saskatchewan Liberal Party
16th	1968–1971	David Boldt	Saskatchewan Liberal Party
17th	1971–1975	David Boldt	Saskatchewan Liberal Party
18th	1975–1978	Ralph Katzman	Progressive Conservative Party of Saskatchewan
19th	1978–1982	Ralph Katzman	Progressive Conservative Party of Saskatchewan
20th	1982–1986	Ralph Katzman	Progressive Conservative Party of Saskatchewan
21st	1986–1991	William Neudorf	Progressive Conservative Party of Saskatchewan
22nd	1991–1995	William Neudorf	Progressive Conservative Party of Saskatchewan
23rd	1995–1999	Ben Heppner	Progressive Conservative Party of Saskatchewan
21st	1999–2003	Ben Heppner	Progressive Conservative Party of Saskatchewan
Riding became Martensville			

== See also ==
- List of Saskatchewan provincial electoral districts
- List of Saskatchewan general elections
- Canadian provincial electoral districts
