= Edward Nasserden =

Canadian politician

- Official 1966 portrait

Member of the Canadian Parliament for Rosthern
- In office March 1958 – April 1968
- Preceded by: Walter Tucker
- Succeeded by: District was abolished in 1966

Personal details
- Born: 6 April 1919; Clarks Crossing, Saskatchewan, Canada
- Died: 13 November 1995 (aged 76); Wadena, Saskatchewan, Canada
- Political party: Progressive Conservative
- Profession: executive director, farmer

Edward Nasserden (6 April 1919 at Clarks Crossing, Saskatchewan – 13 November 1995) was a Canadian politician, executive director and farmer. Nasserden was a Progressive Conservative party member of the House of Commons of Canada.

He was first elected at the Rosthern riding in the 1958 general election, after an unsuccessful bid for the seat in 1953. Nasserden was re-elected in 1962, 1963 and 1965 then with riding boundary changes he was defeated in the 1968 election at Saskatoon—Biggar, losing to Alfred Gleave of the New Democratic Party.
