= William Pattison Telford Sr. =

Canadian politician

William Pattison Telford
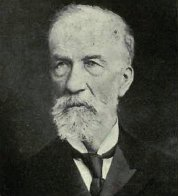

Member of the Canadian Parliament for Grey North
- In office 1904–1908
- Preceded by: Thomas Inkerman Thomson
- Succeeded by: William Sora Middlebro

Personal details
- Born: October 11, 1836 Newcastle, Roxborough, Scotland
- Died: May 4, 1922 (aged 85)
- Party: Liberal
- Children: William Pattison Telford Jr.

William Pattison Telford (October 11, 1836 – May 4, 1922) was a Canadian banker and politician.

Born in Castleton, Roxburghshire, Scotland, Telford was educated at public schools in Dumfries, Waterloo County, Sydenham, Grey County and at the Toronto Normal School. Telford spent three years in stone cutting and building, the next 14 years in teaching, holding a first class certificate at the expiration of that period, and two or three years in building operations. He then became a banker. Telford was president of the Sun Portland Cement Company and Manager of the Grey and Bruce Loan Company. He was with his regiment during the Fenian raids in 1866.

He was a member of the Owen Sound Town Council, before being elected to the House of Commons of Canada for Grey North in the 1904 federal election. A Liberal, he was defeated in 1908.

He married Margaret Couper in 1867. His son, William Pattison Telford Jr., was also a Member of Parliament.

1904 Canadian federal election: Grey North
Party	Candidate	Votes
Liberal	William Pattison Telford Sr.	2,975
Conservative	Thomas Inkerman Thomson	2,952

1908 Canadian federal election: Grey North
Party	Candidate	Votes
Conservative	William Sora Middlebro	2,923
Liberal	William Pattison Telford Sr.	2,777
