= Grey—Simcoe =

Former federal electoral district in Ontario, Canada

Ontario electoral district

Defunct federal electoral district
- Legislature: House of Commons
- District created: 1966
- District abolished: 1987
- First contested: 1968
- Last contested: 1984

Grey—Simcoe was a federal electoral district represented in the House of Commons of Canada from 1968 to 1988. It was located in the province of Ontario. This riding was created in 1966 from parts of Grey North, Grey—Bruce and Simcoe East ridings.

It initially consisted of the City of Owen Sound, the Village of Chatsworth and the Townships of Collingwood, Euphrasia, Holland, Osprey, St. Vincent, and Sydenham in the County of Grey; and Christian Islands Indian reserve No. 30 and the Townships of Flos, Nottawasaga, Sunnidale and Tiny (excepting the Town of Penetanguishene) in the County of Simcoe.

In 1976, it was redefined to consist of the City of Owen Sound, the Townships of Artemesia, Collingwood, Euphrasia, Proton, Osprey, Sarawak, St. Vincent, and Sydenham (including the Town of Markdale) in the County of Grey; and the Townships of Nottawasaga and Sunnidale (including the Town of Wasaga Beach) in the County of Simcoe.

The electoral district was abolished in 1987 when it was redistributed between Bruce—Grey, Simcoe Centre, Simcoe North and Wellington—Grey—Dufferin—Simcoe ridings.

== Members of Parliament ==
This riding has elected the following members of Parliament:

Parliament	Years	Member	Party
Riding created from Grey North, Grey—Bruce and Simcoe East
28th	1968–1972	Percy Verner Noble	Progressive Conservative
29th	1972–1974	Gus Mitges	Progressive Conservative
30th	1974–1979	Gus Mitges	Progressive Conservative
31st	1979–1980	Gus Mitges	Progressive Conservative
32nd	1980–1984	Gus Mitges	Progressive Conservative
33rd	1984–1988	Gus Mitges	Progressive Conservative
Riding dissolved into Bruce—Grey, Simcoe Centre, Simcoe North and Wellington—Grey—Dufferin—Simcoe

== Election results ==
1968 Canadian federal election
Party	Candidate	Votes
Progressive Conservative	Percy Verner Noble	13,146
Liberal	Arnold Vancise	11,204
New Democratic	Trueman R. Barber	3,623

1972 Canadian federal election
Party	Candidate	Votes
Progressive Conservative	Gus Mitges	17,092
Liberal	Lindsay Inglis	11,198
New Democratic	Dennis Mann	5,093
Social Credit	James W. McGillivray	1,004

1974 Canadian federal election
Party	Candidate	Votes
Progressive Conservative	Gus Mitges	15,917
Liberal	Ian Miller	13,235
New Democratic	Stan Baker	4,490
Social Credit	James W. McGillivray	678

1979 Canadian federal election
Party	Candidate	Votes
Progressive Conservative	Gus Mitges	20,825
Liberal	Jack Morgan	11,191
New Democratic	Bill Proud	5,576
Libertarian	Bill Shannon	285
Social Credit	Bruce Arnold	165

1980 Canadian federal election
Party	Candidate	Votes
Progressive Conservative	Gus Mitges	16,488
Liberal	Murray Betts	12,553
New Democratic	Joan Stone	6,236
Libertarian	Bill Shannon	404
Social Credit	Nancy Arnold	93

1984 Canadian federal election
Party	Candidate	Votes
Progressive Conservative	Gus Mitges	23,342
Liberal	Joe Sheffer	9,369
New Democratic	Joan Stone	6,001
Libertarian	Eric Biggins	337

== See also ==
- List of Canadian electoral districts
- Historical federal electoral districts of Canada
