= Victor Porteous =

Canadian politician

Victor C. Porteous

Member of Parliament for Grey North
- In office July 1930 – October 1935
- Preceded by: William Pattison Telford, Jr.
- Succeeded by: William Pattison Telford, Jr.

Personal details
- Born: Victor Clarence Porteous; 5 November 1893 Derby Township, Ontario
- Died: 17 June 1966 (aged 72)
- Party: Conservative
- Spouse(s): Alma M. Wilson m. 26 August 1914
- Profession: Farmer

Victor Clarence Porteous (5 November 1893 – 17 June 1966) was a National Government and Conservative member of the House of Commons of Canada. He was born in Derby Township, Ontario and became a farmer.

Porteous attended school at Owen Sound Collegiate and Vocational Institute, then college. In 1929 and 1930, he was a member of Derby Township council.

He was elected to Parliament at the Grey North riding in the 1930 general election, defeating incumbent Liberal member William Pattison Telford, Jr. After serving one term, he was defeated by Telford in the 1935 election. Porteous made another attempt to win the seat back in the 1940 election under the National Party banner but was also unsuccessful.
