= Rosthern (federal electoral district) =

Former federal electoral district in Saskatchewan, Canada

Rosthern was a federal electoral district in Saskatchewan, Canada, that was represented in the House of Commons of Canada from 1935 to 1968. This riding was created in 1933 from parts of Humboldt, Long Lake, Prince Albert and Saskatoon ridings.

It was abolished in 1966 when it was redistributed into Moose Jaw, Prince Albert, Regina—Lake Centre, Saskatoon—Biggar and Saskatoon—Humboldt ridings.

== Election results ==
1935 Canadian federal election
| Party | Candidate | Votes |
|---|---|---|
| Liberal | Walter Adam Tucker | 7,515 |
| Reconstruction | Herbert Henry Henschel | 1,854 |
| Social Credit | Virden Gable | 1,628 |
| Co-operative Commonwealth | Helmer John Benson | 1,613 |
| Conservative | Henry Warner Fisher | 602 |

1940 Canadian federal election
| Party | Candidate | Votes |
|---|---|---|
| Liberal | Walter Adam Tucker | 6,612 |
| Co-operative Commonwealth | Peter George Makaroff | 5,456 |
| New Democracy | Peter Paul Lepp | 999 |

1945 Canadian federal election
| Party | Candidate | Votes |
|---|---|---|
| Liberal | Walter Adam Tucker | 6,898 |
| Co-operative Commonwealth | Charles Mycroft | 4,678 |
| Progressive Conservative | John Hilliard Currie | 1,299 |
| Social Credit | Leonard Ferdinand Kurtenbach | 792 |

By-election on 25 October 1948 On Tucker's resignation, 8 June 1948
| Party | Candidate | Votes |
| Liberal | William Albert Boucher | 6,233 |
| Co-operative Commonwealth | Peter George Makaroff | 3,278 |
| Social Credit | George William Beilhartz | 2,369 |

1949 Canadian federal election
| Party | Candidate | Votes |
|---|---|---|
| Liberal | William Albert Boucher | 7,398 |
| Co-operative Commonwealth | George Raphael Berzowsky | 3,700 |
| Progressive Conservative | John Hilliard Currie | 837 |

1953 Canadian federal election
| Party | Candidate | Votes |
|---|---|---|
| Liberal | Walter Adam Tucker | 8,616 |
| Co-operative Commonwealth | Odd Haakon Opseth | 6,347 |
| Social Credit | Isaac Elias | 2,333 |
| Progressive Conservative | Edward Nasserden | 1,643 |

1957 Canadian federal election
| Party | Candidate | Votes |
|---|---|---|
| Liberal | Walter Adam Tucker | 6,828 |
| Social Credit | Herbert Henry Henschel | 6,193 |
| Co-operative Commonwealth | Edward J. Brunyanski | 5,830 |

1958 Canadian federal election
| Party | Candidate | Votes |
|---|---|---|
| Progressive Conservative | Edward Nasserden | 8,166 |
| Liberal | Walter Adam Tucker | 4,446 |
| Co-operative Commonwealth | George Elchuk | 3,322 |
| Social Credit | Herbert Henry Henschel | 1,745 |

1962 Canadian federal election
| Party | Candidate | Votes |
|---|---|---|
| Progressive Conservative | Edward Nasserden | 10,626 |
| Liberal | Michael A. Swenarchuk | 4,345 |
| New Democratic | Percy Gratias | 3,193 |
| Social Credit | Herbert Henry Henschel | 1,652 |

1963 Canadian federal election
| Party | Candidate | Votes |
|---|---|---|
| Progressive Conservative | Edward Nasserden | 11,351 |
| Liberal | Otto Theodore Lang | 3,804 |
| New Democratic | W.E. McCloy | 2,428 |
| Social Credit | John C. Froese | 1,213 |

1965 Canadian federal election
| Party | Candidate | Votes |
|---|---|---|
| Progressive Conservative | Edward Nasserden | 10,042 |
| Liberal | Michael A. Swenarchuk | 3,773 |
| New Democratic | Constance E. Kinzel | 3,571 |
| Social Credit | Ben J. Dyck | 704 |

== See also ==
- List of Canadian electoral districts
- Historical federal electoral districts of Canada
