= Andrew McNaughton =

Canadian general (1887–1966)

General the Honourable Andrew McNaughton PC CH CB CMG DSO CD
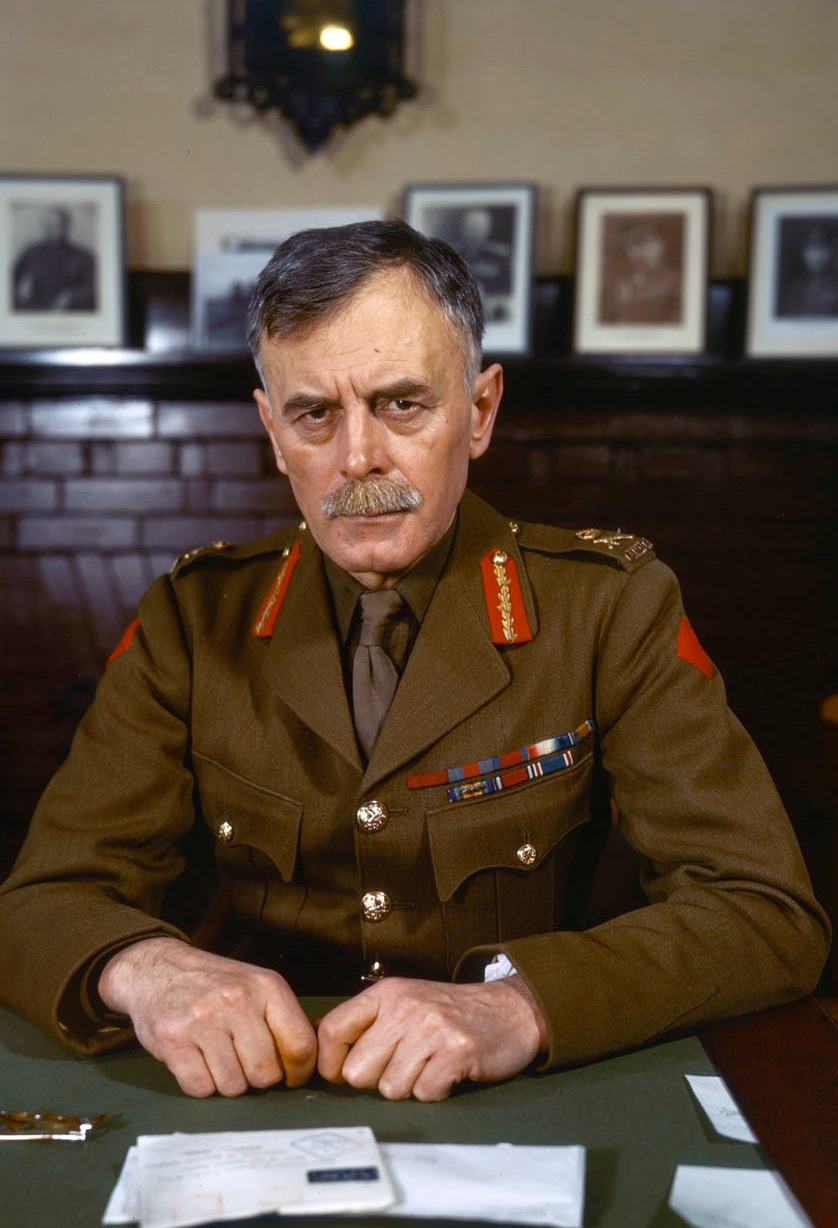
- General Andrew McNaughton, 1943.

Canadian Ambassador to the United Nations
- In office January 1948 – December 1949
- Prime Minister: W. L. Mackenzie King; Louis St. Laurent
- Preceded by: Position established
- Succeeded by: John Wendell Holmes

Minister of National Defence
- In office 2 November 1944 – 20 August 1945
- Prime Minister: W. L. Mackenzie King
- Preceded by: James Ralston
- Succeeded by: Douglas Abbott

Chief of the General Staff
- In office 1929–1935
- Preceded by: Herbert Cyril Thacker
- Succeeded by: Ernest Charles Ashton

Personal details
- Born: Andrew George Latta McNaughton; 25 February 1887 Moosomin, Assiniboia District, North-West Territories
- Died: 11 July 1966 (aged 79) Montreal, Quebec, Canada
- Party: Liberal
- Relations: Andrew Leslie (grandson)
- Civilian awards: King's Privy Council for Canada (1944); Grand Officer of the Order of Leopold (1946)

Military service
- Allegiance: Canada
- Branch/service: Canadian Militia; Canadian Expeditionary Force; Canadian Army
- Years of service: 1909–1944
- Rank: General
- Commands: Chief of the General Staff; 1st Canadian Infantry Division; VII British Corps; I Canadian Corps; First Canadian Army; Chief of the General Staff
- Battles/wars: First World War; Second World War
- Military awards: Member of the Order of the Companions of Honour (1946); Companion of the Order of the Bath (1935); Companion of the Order of St Michael and St George (1919); Companion of the Distinguished Service Order (1917); Recipient of the Canadian Forces' Decoration (1955)

General Andrew George Latta McNaughton PC CH CB CMG DSO CD (25 February 1887 – 11 July 1966) was a Canadian electrical engineer, scientist, army officer, cabinet minister, and diplomat.

Before the First World War, McNaughton was a professor of engineering at McGill University. During the war he distinguished himself as an officer of the Canadian Expeditionary Force, was wounded twice and was twice awarded the Distinguished Service Order. In the interwar period, McNaughton served as Chief of the General Staff, where he was instrumental in modernizing and mechanizing the Canadian Army.

McNaughton commanded major Canadian field units in the first half of the Second World War and served as the commander of the First Canadian Army until he was relieved in 1943. He then served as Minister of National Defence until the end of the war. During his tenure as Minister, McNaughton was involved in the crisis surrounding the decision to send conscripts, known as "Zombies," for overseas service.

== Early life ==
McNaughton was born in Moosomin, District of Assiniboia, North-West Territories (now part of Saskatchewan), on 25 February 1887. Both of McNaughton's parents were immigrants from Scotland, and his youth was a happy one, being brought up by an adventuresome father who had once been a trader in buffalo hides and a kindly, loving mother. His upbringing on a farm instilled in him a life-long love of hard work and self-discipline. McNaughton spent his free time riding horses across the vast expanses of the Prairies while also engaging in hunting and fishing. McNaughton credited his youth on a frontier farm on the Prairies with making him tough and hardy. His parents had both converted to the Church of England, voted Conservative and like many other Anglo-Canadians in the Victorian era strongly identified with the British Empire.

McNaughton held to a specific Scottish-Canadian identity, which led him to a sense of Canadian nationalism based on his feeling that the British Empire was dominated by the English while Canada was dominated by Scottish-Canadians like himself, but his biographer John Rickard noted "...even though he would come into conflict with British generals, he always held the British people and their accomplishments in a high regard". McNaughton always attended Anglican services, and though he was devoted to science, believing that the pure rationality of science was the best solution to the world's problems, he never seems to have any difficulty in reconciling his faith in the Anglican church with his faith in science. Despite being a member of the Church of England, he was always very proud of his Scottish heritage.

McNaughton was a student at Bishop's College School in Lennoxville, Quebec, after winning a scholarship. At Bishop's, McNaughton was both successful student and an athlete. In 1905, he entered McGill University in Montreal where he studied under the New Zealander physicist Ernest Rutherford. As a student, his grades were outstanding, and he was singled out by Rutherford as a man to watch. As an undergraduate, he applied for a commission in the Indian Army with the hope of a joining a famous cavalry regiment, saying it been his boyhood dream to serve the British Empire in India. He joined the Canadian non-permanent Militia in 1909. and earned a B.A. in physics and engineering from McGill University in Montreal in 1910, where he was a member of the Kappa Alpha Society, and earned an MSc with Honours in Electrical Engineering in 1912. He then stayed on at McGill as an instructor as a professor of engineering until the outbreak of the Great War.

His work in engineering innovation led to his invention of a cathode ray direction finder – a form of the technology that would evolve into radar. In 1914, he married Mabel Weir of Montreal, who was Irish and Catholic.

== First World War ==
While still a student at McGill, McNaughton joined the Canadian Militia in 1909. He took the 4th Battery of the Canadian Expeditionary Force overseas with the outbreak of the First World War in the summer of 1914 and arrived in France in February 1915. In March 1916 he was promoted to lieutenant colonel and went to England to take command of the newly arrived 11 (Howitzer) Brigade of the Royal Regiment of Canadian Artillery, taking it to France in July. In February 1917 he was appointed the Counter Battery Staff Officer of the Canadian Corps. Lieutenant-General Sir Julian Byng, the British commander of the Canadian Corps from 1916−1917, when Lieutenant General Arthur Currie succeeded him, personally selected McNaughton, saying that while McNaughton was a relatively young man, he had already heard much about his work, hence his promotion from the command of a brigade to senior position with the corps command. On the day before the Armistice with Germany in November 1918, at 31 years old, he was promoted to brigadier general and appointed General Officer Commanding (GOC) of the Canadian Corps Artillery.

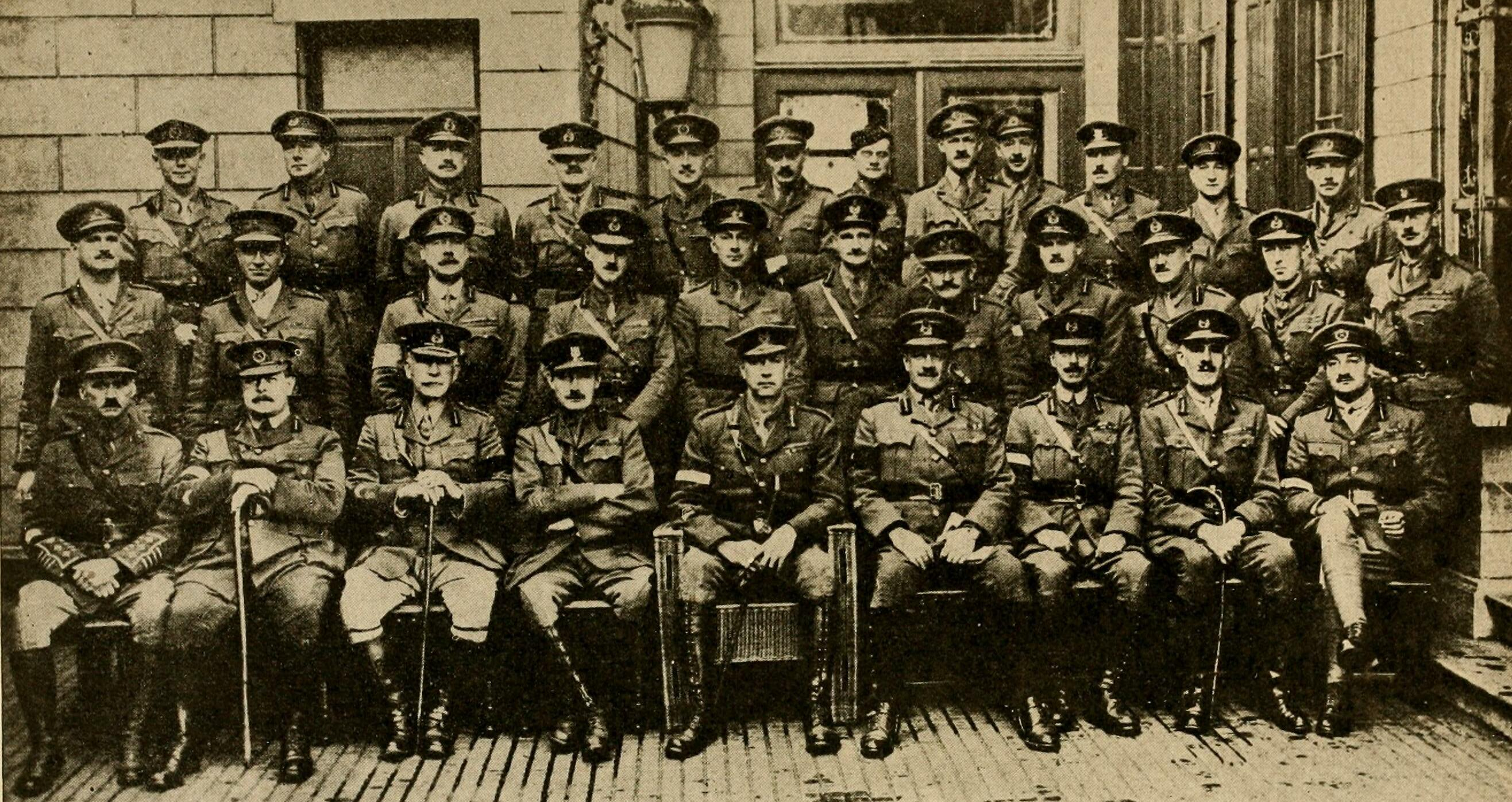
Lieutenant General Sir Arthur Currie with Prince Arthur of Connaught and other senior officers. McNaughton is in the back row, sixth from the left.

During the war, he was wounded twice and received multiple decorations. McNaughton did not demand the normal privileges of an officer, living alongside his men and eating the same food, and was noted for his care for his men. McNaughton slept on the floor, consumed the same bully beef rations as the average soldier, saying he was a farm boy at heart and did not need a bed or better food while preferring to be addressed as Andy instead of by his rank. McNaughton was very popular with the men who served under him, who regarded him as their friend who represented their interests instead of the high command.

Particularly after being promoted to Corps Counter Battery Staff Officer, McNaughton used his expertise in engineering to help make advances in the science of artillery particularly in pinpointing artillery targets, both stationary and moving. His acumen and expertise is often pointed to as a key to the Canadian success in the Battle of Vimy Ridge where McNaughton's innovations in the detection of German artillery positions with flash-spotting and sound-ranging led to the Canadians accurately mapping the vast majority of German gun positions before the infantry were sent into battle. A technique McNaughton had developed to measure the wear on cannon barrels and make adjustments to their aiming proved to be vital on April 9, 1917, when the Canadian Corps assaulted Vimy Ridge. As the battle commenced, the combination of accurately plotted German gun positions and deadly accurate Canadian artillery fire led to precise strikes that eliminated over 80% of enemy artillery and machine guns, significantly blunting their defences. As the infantry attacked, precise artillery fire allowed the effective implementation of the creeping barrage which proved vital to the success of the infantry advance.

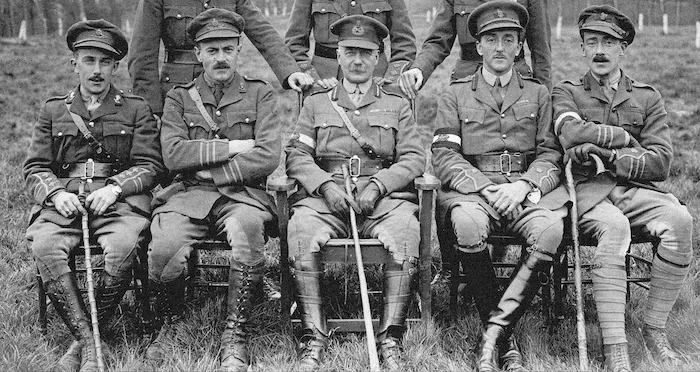
From right to left: Lawrence Cosgrave, Alan Brooke, Edward Morrison and McNaughton during the First World War

At Vimy, the counter-battery team under McNaughton's command knocked out 83% of the 212 German artillery guns on Vimy Ridge in the first two hours, making it possible for the infantry of the Canadian Corps to advance up the heights and take the ridge. Vimy Ridge had been unsuccessfully assaulted by the French with heavy losses in 1915 and likewise by the British in 1916, making it into a symbol of German power on the Western Front, a massive and heavily fortified ridge towering over the front that was widely considered impossible to take. The fact that the four divisions of the Canadian Corps in their first battle together took Vimy Ridge in two days led to the battle taking on a legendary aura in Canada that it retains to this day. McNaughton's role in using operational research to map out precisely where the German artillery guns were on Vimy Ridge and then taking them out made his reputation. The fact that McNaughton was only 30 at the time further marked him out as an outstanding gunner.

His most serious wound occurred on 5 February 1918 when he was hit by the fragments of a German shell, requiring a stay in a hospital. That same month, he received the Distinguished Service Order (DSO). Later in the year, a bar was added to his DSO, with the bar's citation reading:

For conspicuous gallantry and devotion to duty while in charge of wagon lines and ammunition supply. He repeatedly brought up teams, and controlled their withdrawal, under heavy shell fire. He never let the guns be without ammunition.

By war's end, McNaughton was widely considered to be the most talented and capable artilleryman in any army. General Sir Frederick Pile, of the British Army's Royal Artillery, who served alongside McNaughton in the First World War wrote in 1918 that McNaughton was "probably the best and most scientific gunner in any army in the world. His ideas were colossal."

== Interwar period ==
=== Chief of the General staff ===
In 1920 McNaughton joined the regular army and in 1922 was promoted to Deputy Chief of the General Staff and Chief of the General Staff in 1929. During that time he worked at mechanizing the army and modernizing the militia. In 1919, it became necessary to integrate the numbered battalions of the returning Canadian Expeditionary Force with the old militia regiments, the then Prime Minister Sir Robert Borden created the Otter committee headed by General Sir William Otter. In general, the Otter committee tended to create as many regiments as possible across the country, but McNaughton, who served on the Otter committee, ensured Princess Patricia's Canadian Light Infantry, which had been privately raised in 1914, was taken on by the "permanent force militia" as a regiment for western Canada. Likewise, McNaughton ensured that the 22nd Battalion of the Canadian Expeditionary Force was not disbanded, arguing that the 22nd Battalion, which came from Quebec and won more battle honours than any other Canadian battalion, should be kept on to show the army appreciated the sacrifices of French Canadians in the war. The 22nd Battalion was assigned to the "permanent force militia" as the 22nd Regiment, becoming the Royal 22nd Regiment in 1922, and went on to become the most famous French-Canadian regiment in the Canadian Army. McNaughton wrote the part of the Otter committee's report which stated the "principal peril" to Canada was "the danger of the overthrow of Law and Order" by "Bolshevik agitators", whom the report in a xenophobic note stated were mostly immigrants from Eastern Europe. McNaughton wrote that the best way of defeating the "Bolshevik peril" was "to have immediately available an efficient military body with which to overawe this unruly element, and secondly, by education, to convert them from their perverted ideals to a true conception of citizenship". As such, McNaughton envisioned the militia as primarily an internal security force that was intended to fulfil the role of "aid to civil power".

McNaughton was described as "a forceful dynamic thruster with a tornado-like intellect", whom the historian James Eayrs wrote "dominated his colleagues in the military establishment as a great oak dominates a scrub forest". At the same time, McNaughton was referred to as "a master military bureaucratic politician" who fought hard for more funding for defence and as a general who was so interested in scientific problems who had "attacks of the gadgets" during staff meetings, as he was always fascinated by science and technology. McNaughton remained active as a scientist throughout his military career, being regularly published in various scientific journals. To secure more military funding from hostile politicians, McNaughton, whom many viewed as the most powerful civil servant in Ottawa during the interwar period, pushed strongly for northern development. As part of his plans to develop the far north of Canada, McNaughton pressed for the aerial mapping and survey of the north (much of which was still unmapped as late as the 1930s), which increased the budget for the Royal Canadian Air Force and for the building of the Northwest Territories and Yukon Radio System, which increased the budget for the Royal Canadian Corps of Signals. McNaughton's interests reached beyond the military as he became the most powerful civil servant in Ottawa in the interwar period, and promoted the militia as a "school for the nation." He argued that the "foundations of military efficiency" rested upon providing a patriotic education to male citizens by way of their service in the militia, which would lead to the "creation of a national spirit," the fostering of which McNaughton tended to see as his principal duty.

As a "gunner" (artilleryman), McNaughton favoured promoting officers from the artillery and engineers over the cavalry and infantry, increasing the portion of general staff officers with a background in the technical services well above the 50% already reached in 1922. Officers from the cavalry and the infantry complained that under McNaughton's leadership the "gunners" were holding most of the senior positions. In 1929–30, McNaughton came into major conflict with the Defence Minister, Colonel James Ralston, a highly decorated veteran who considered himself just as much an expert on defence matters as McNaughton, something that caused considerable vexation between the Chief of Staff and the Minister of National Defence. Ralston vetoed McNaughton's plans to upgrade the equipment of the permanent force militia and to build more arsenals, saying that the Liberals would not be "Merchants of Death". Had the Liberals won the 1930 election, McNaughton was planning to resign as he did not want to serve any longer under Ralston.

McNaughton was a friend of the Conservative leader Richard Bennett and in the 1930 election, secretly reviewed drafts of his campaign speeches and in 1935 when Bennett swung to the left with his "New Deal", McNaughton likewise secretly suggested improvements to his speeches. It was during the years 1930–35 when Bennett was Prime Minister that McNaughton was at the height of his influence in Ottawa. During the interwar period, McNaughton was widely credited with inventing the cathode ray tube, which enhanced his reputation as a brilliant scientist-general, making him the best-known Canadian soldier and scientist around the world. In 1933, when the Bennett government brought in the "Big Cut" to defence spending, ordering the defence department to cut $3.6 million at once, McNaughton tried very hard to abolish the Royal Canadian Navy (RCN), arguing that Canada did not need a navy and without a navy, the defence department would save $2 million/per year. In a lengthy bureaucratic battle, Commodore Walter Hose of the Royal Canadian Navy argued to the Bennett government that McNaughton was wrong to dismiss sea power as he did, and with Japan showing expansionist tendencies as proven by the seizing the Manchuria region of China in 1931, that Canada did need a navy. The RCN was almost abolished in 1933, but for Hose's efforts to save it. McNaughton's Army-centered arguments for abolishing the RCN left a lasting bitterness between the two services that lasted decades.

The Canadian historian Colonel John English wrote that McNaughton, for all his intelligence and drive, had an overall deleterious effect on the Canadian military, describing him as a general who was so caught up in his scientific studies that he neglected military issues. McNaughton shared the long-standing hostility felt by most Canadians to a professional army and believed that a well-trained militia was all that was needed. In 1931, McNaughton forcefully stated his belief that "a Citizen Militia...is the proper type of Land Defence Force for Canada," and that the "permanent force militia" (a euphemism for the professional army) should serve as the "instructional corps" for the militia. McNaughton did not see the importance of training officers for the operational level of war, writing that the "foundations of military efficiency" were the education of Canadian men and that the "creation of a national spirit" suitable for war: he argued that the "technical efficiency in the various arms and services... would readily follow," for all that was required to prepare for war was "...merely a matter of drill and training combined with careful selection of suitable material". Reflecting his strongly scientific bent, McNaughton wrote what was needed were officers well trained in science like himself and that "a highly scientific army requiring highly trained personnel...[could] be best obtained quite outside the army itself". One consequence of this way of viewing war was that McNaughton cut the funding for the training of infantry and cavalry officers while ensuring the majority of the officer training went to those in artillery, engineer and signals branches. As a result, the majority of officers holding senior positions in the Canadian Army in World War II were artillerymen, engineers and signals men. As early as 1933 there were complaints from infantry officers that "the gunners" as artillerymen were known were monopolizing the senior positions as McNaughton himself was a "gunner". In 1932, Brigadier James Sutherland Brown wrote about McNaughton: "the C.G.S is a super-engineer and college professor by profession. He is a gunner in the Canadian Militia and, technically, he is a good one. He is cold, calculating, touchy, and determined to pursue his own schemes, inclined to do everything himself and will not take advice". McNaughton insisted that officers seeking high command attend courses at the Imperial Defence College which provided much training for questions of grand strategy. English described McNaughton as having neglected the study of war on the operational level, which did not interest him in the same way that grand strategy and science did.

=== Formation of relief camps ===
By the summer of 1932, due to the massive unemployment caused by the Great Depression, Canada had become poverty-stricken with much of the populace left destitute. While on a tour of the nation's military establishments General McNaughton was shocked by the spectacle of homeless men living in shacks, begging on the streets of Western cities and swarming aboard freight trains to move on to the next town or city in search of a job. McNaughton recognized this as a situation where the possibility of revolution didn't seem unrealistic. In October he presented a proposal eagerly grasped by Prime Minister R. B. Bennett, that had two aims. It would get the men off the streets, out of the cities and out of sight, and, at the same time improve their bodies and provide useful work in a group of camps, run by the military. In the so-called "relief camps" men would be fed, clothed and housed, and would work on projects of national importance—building airfields, highways and other public works. As an "alternative to bloodshed on the streets," this stop-gap solution for unemployment was to establish military-run and -styled relief camps in remote areas throughout the country, where single unemployed men toiled for twenty cents a day.

What appeared to be a humanitarian effort to aid the unemployed and indigent and prevent the propagation of revolution soon turned into a hotbed of dissent due to the draconian disciplinary measures adopted. Portions of a letter smuggled out read to the House of Commons by J. S. Woodsworth, MP for Winnipeg North Centre described the conditions.

"Picture to yourself a tarpaper shack 79 feet x 24 with no windows, along each side there is a row of double decker bunks, these are spaced off with 8 × 1 board so that there is room for two men in each bunk. The bunks are filled with straw and you crawl into them from the foot end. Along the front of the lower bunk a narrow board is placed upon which the men may sit. The place is very meagerly lighted and ventilation by three skylights.... So narrow is the passageway between the bunks that when the men are sitting on the bench there is scarcely room to pass between them. This shack houses 88 men.... At times the place reeks of the foul smell and at night the air is simply fetid. The floor is dirty and the end of the shack where the men wash ... is caked with black mud. The toilet is thoroughly filthy, unsanitary, and far too small."

The irony was that McNaughton's scheme for staving off revolution had the seeds of revolution inherent in it. Within two years the camps that had been greeted with such applause would be known throughout the country as slave camps. The "volunteer inmates" were not allowed newspapers, magazines or radios. Any man who left a camp, even for a visit to his family, was subsequently refused re-entry and the "dole" was denied to him.

== National Research Council of Canada ==
He returned for a few years to civilian life and from 1935 to 1939 was head of the National Research Council of Canada. National Research Council Building M50 on the Ottawa Campus was named the McNaughton Building, in his honour.

IEEE Canada honours McNaughton in the naming of the McNaughton Award, presented annually for excellence in engineering.

== Second World War ==
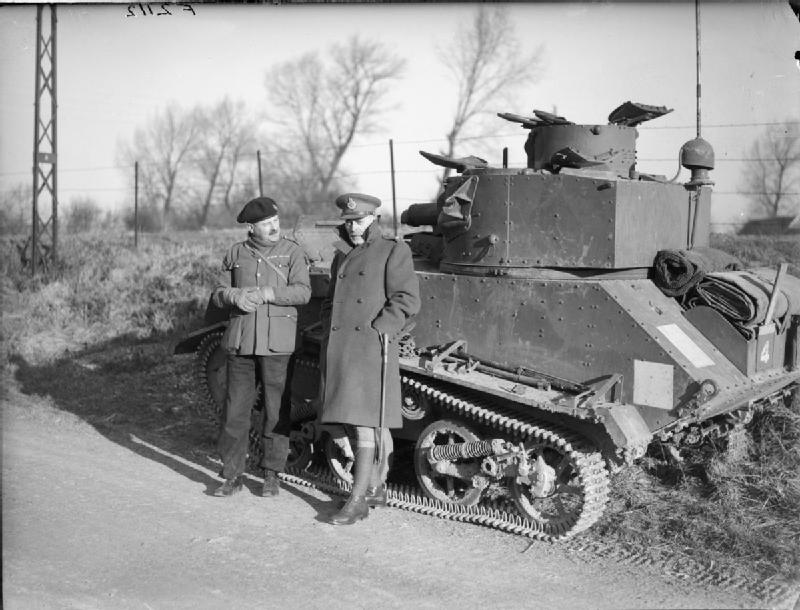
Major-General Andrew McNaughton and an officer of the British Royal Tank Regiment standing by a Light Tank Mk VI in France, 11 January 1940.

As the best known Canadian soldier, McNaughton was the natural choice to lead the Canadian Expeditionary Force to Europe; the fact that McNaughton was vocally opposed to conscription, insisting that an all-volunteer force was all that was needed to win the war endeared him to the then Prime Minister, William Lyon Mackenzie King, who had promised in September 1939 that there would be no overseas conscription. In September 1939, the Union Nationale Premier of Quebec, Maurice Duplessis, had called a snap election with the aim of seeking a mandate to oppose the war, and to defeat Duplessis, Mackenzie King had promised the people of Quebec there would no overseas conscription. Having McNaughton as a professional soldier endorse Mackenzie King's no overseas conscription views as militarily sound and correct gave the prime minister a potent political shield to wield against those in English Canada who called for overseas conscription. Furthermore, McNaughton's views that the correct way to defeat Germany was through a series of methodical, "scientific" operations in which artillery was to play the dominant role promised to minimize casualties, which was the all-important consideration for Mackenzie King who wanted to avoid battles with heavy casualties as that would force him to make a difficult decision about conscription. Mackenzie King had remembered how the heavy losses taken by the Canadian Expeditionary Force in the battles from 1915 to 1917 had led to the Conscription Crisis of 1917, as by 1917 the government of Sir Robert Borden had the choice of either pulling the Canadian Corps out of action or bring in conscription, and he very much wanted to avoid a repeat.

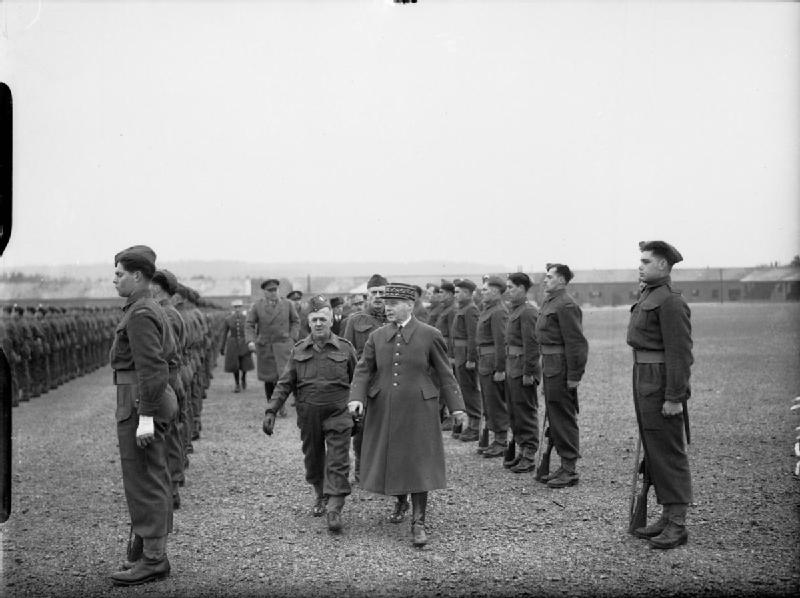
General Maurice Gamelin, Commander−in-Chief (C-in-C) of the French Army, reviews Canadian troops at Aldershot, May 1940. Stood behind him is Major-General Andrew McNaughton.

=== Division commander ===
McNaughton commanded the newly raised 1st Canadian Infantry Division during the early part of the Second World War, and led the division overseas, first to the United Kingdom in December 1939 and later to France in June 1940, only to be withdrawn back to England in the final stages of the Battle of France. McNaughton, who was known for his care for his men, ensuring that the Canadian soldiers sent to Britain had the best possible accommodations, was always very popular with the rank and file of the Canadian Army. As the best known Canadian general in the world, McNaughton attracted much media attention in Canada, the United Kingdom and even the neutral United States as the great "soldier-scientist", making the cover of Life magazine on 18 December 1939, which predicated that McNaughton was the Allied general most likely to take Berlin. In April 1940, when the British government asked McNaughton's permission to send the 1st Canadian Division to Norway, McNaughton agreed, though the Norwegian campaign ended in defeat before the Canadians could arrive. As Mackenzie King was visiting the United States at the time to see President Franklin D. Roosevelt, the acting prime minister in Ottawa was the finance minister, Colonel Ralston, who still very much disliked McNaughton. Ralston chose to make an issue of the fact that McNaughton had agreed to send the 1st Division to Norway without consulting Ottawa first, saying this was an illegal act. McNaughton felt that he acted legally as he sought an opinion from the Deputy Judge Advocate, Price Montague about the legality of sending the 1st Division to Norway before agreeing first, exploded in rage about "politicians trying to run the war while 3,000 miles away".

In June 1940, McNaughton's old nemesis, Colonel Ralston, was brought back by Mackenzie King as Defence Minister after Norman Rogers, the previous defence minister, was killed in an airplane clash. Relations between Ralston and McNaughton remained unfriendly as they had been in 1929–30. In a reversal of the expected roles, General McNaughton insisted as a professional soldier that overseas conscription was unsound while Ralston, the civilian minister of defence, was more open to the idea of overseas conscription. Ernest Côté, one of the officers on McNaughton's staff was astonished to see McNaughton call up Ralston in Ottawa to make a complaint about the appearance of Canadian Army trucks on aesthetic grounds, saying he wanted Ralston to send over more aesthetically pleasing trucks as the current trucks were too ugly for his liking. In an interview with the historian Jack Granatstein, Côté described McNaughton as a man who was universally admired and liked by the officers who served under him, but he stated that he had nagging doubts about McNaughtons' fitness for high command, saying he had an obsessive personality for whom no detail was too small. McNaughton's relations with the first two Chiefs of the Imperial General Staff, Field Marshal Edmund Ironside and Field Marshal John Dill, were excellent as he served alongside both men in the Great War and counted them as amongst his friends.

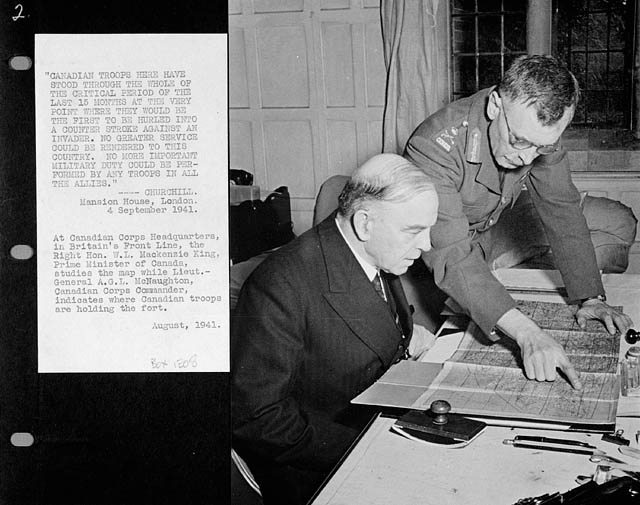
The Canadian Prime Minister, Mackenzie King, and Lieutenant-General Andrew McNaughton studying a map at Canadian Corps Headquarters, August 1941.

=== Corps and army commander ===
Now promoted to lieutenant general, he commanded VII Corps from July to December 1940 when it was renamed the Canadian Corps. Then under his leadership the Canadian Army in the United Kingdom, reinforced with the II Canadian Corps, and the Canadian Corps being redesignated as the I Canadian Corps, was organized into the Canadian First Army in April 1942. McNaughton's contribution to the development of new techniques was outstanding, especially in the field of detection and weaponry, including the discarding sabot projectile. Tensions between Ralston and McNaughton were increased in December 1941 after the fall of Hong Kong and the loss of the entire C Force when McNaughton in an "off-the-record" interview with the media blamed Ralston, saying he was "completely unfitted for the job" and that C Force should never had been sent to Hong Kong.

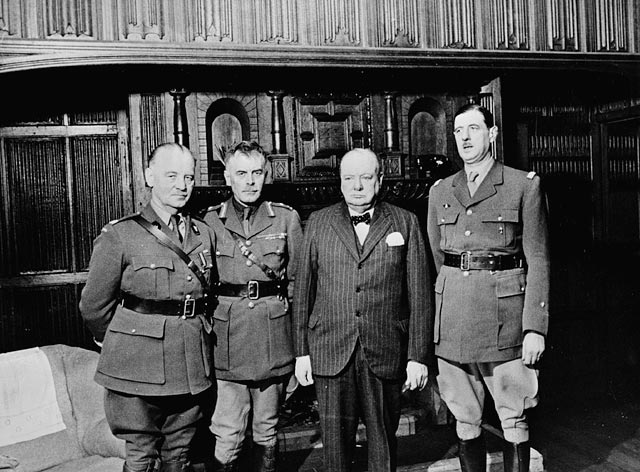
Distinguished visitors at Canadian Corps Headquarters, sometime in 1941. From left to right: Polish Lieutenant-General Władysław Sikorski, Lieutenant-General Andrew McNaughton, the Right Honorable Winston Churchill, Brigadier-General Charles de Gaulle.

Mackenzie King preferred to keep the First Canadian Army in Britain to guard against a possible German invasion, which had the convenient effect of keeping the Canadians out of action and ensured no casualties, meaning no decision was necessary about overseas conscription. McNaughton very much wanted to keep all five divisions of the First Canadian Army together, insisting he would not allow a division or two to be detached from his command to go to North Africa as he wanted all of the Canadian units to fight together. As a result, the Canadian units languished in Britain, guarding against a possible invasion of Britain that no one felt was very likely after Operation Barbarossa, the German invasion of the Soviet Union, was launched in June 1941, while British, Australian, New Zealand, South African and Indian troops fought in North Africa and the Middle East. While the other Commonwealth units were fighting the North African campaign, many of the Canadian officers and enlisted men in Britain were jealous of the way of the other Commonwealth units were winning glory in North Africa while they had to sit on the sidelines of the war. In the spring of 1942, when McNaughton was approached by Admiral Louis Mountbatten with a request that the 2nd Canadian Division take part in a raid on the French city of Dieppe, McNaughton jumped at the chance to finally get one of his divisions into action.

McNaughton was unduly blamed for the disastrous Dieppe Raid in August 1942, which saw the 2nd Canadian Infantry Division, commanded by Major-General John Hamilton Roberts, sustain heavy casualties, blame better deserved by the British who failed to provide needed, requested, and promised support. General Sir Alan Brooke, the British Chief of the Imperial General Staff (CIGS), his opponent since the First World War, frequently criticized him. Brooke had been the Staff Officer Royal Artillery in the Canadian Corps during the First World War and organized the "creeping barrages" in support of the assaults at the Battle of Vimy Ridge.

=== Relief of army command ===
McNaughton's reputation was badly damaged by the Exercise Spartan war games held on 4–12 March 1943, which he described as "a dress rehearsal for the full-scale invasion of the Continent". McNaughton commanding the First Canadian Army had the task of breaking out over the river Thames to "take" Huntingdon, which was the "capital" of the fictional country of "Eastland", which was defended by VIII Corps and XI Corps of the British Army. Much of the criticism of McNaughton's leadership was over his decision on the night of 7 March 1943 to leave his command post to personally supervise the building of a bridge over the Thames, instead of sending out an engineer officer to build the bridge. This showed that McNaughton was unable to delegate authority properly as he insisted on doing everything himself, leading to command paralysis. McNaughton did not understand war on the operational level, and Colonel English wrote: "That McNaughton had no idea that a corps required a minimum of 24 hour warning in order to execute a major task is borne out by the following timings: at 23:35 on 6 March, he directed 2 Corps to advance east across the Thames through 1 Corps; at 16:15, the next day he gave counter orders to effect the western envelopment that night; at 21:30 on 10 March he issued orders for operations the following day; and at 22:59 11 March, he gave orders for operations on 12 March". Sir James Grigg, the British War Secretary, who attended the Spartan war game wrote he was "appalled at McNaughton's indecision" as "he stood in front of his situation map hesitating as to what to do and what orders to issue". General Alan Brooke, who also attended the Spartan war game wrote in his diary that the Spartan war game had done much to "proving my worse fear that ... McNaughton is quite incompetent to command an army!". The man who was to replace McNaughton as commander of the First Canadian Army, General Harry Crerar, later wrote that during the Spartan war game "that it became patently obvious to all" that McNaughton "was totally unsuitable for high operational command". Spartan ended in the "defeat" of the Canadians as McNaughton was unable to break out over the Thames to "take" Huntingdon".

In the spring of 1943, Mackenzie King, who until then had tried to keep the Canadians out of action as much as possible in order to avoid casualties that might lead to a difficult decision on conscription, became obsessed with the fear that the war might end with the Canadians winning no victories on land. As Churchill had described Italy as the "soft underbelly" of the Axis, King believed the up-coming Italian campaign would provide an opportunity for easy victories that would not cause too many casualties, and insisted to the British that a Canadian division had to take part in Operation Husky, the Allied invasion of Sicily, saying the Canadian people would be unhappy with him if the war ended with only battles for Canada being Hong Kong and Dieppe. Despite King's crass political motives for wanting the Canadians to take part in Husky, the British agreed to accommodate him. McNaughton was opposed at first to losing a division, saying he was opposed to sending the 1st Division to Sicily "merely to satisfy a desire for activity". In June 1943, McNaughton very reluctantly approved of the decision to detach the 1st Canadian Division from the First Canadian Army, which was to take part in Operation Husky as part of the British Eighth Army commanded by General Bernard Montgomery. McNaughton was concerned about losing a division, but was promised that 1st Division would return to Britain to rejoin First Canadian Army when Husky was completed, and the possibility of finally getting the 1st Division into action, which had been assigned to Britain in late 1939, was too much to resist. Operation Husky began on 9 July 1943, and McNaughton complained much when the initial press releases announcing the invasion did not mention the Canadians were taking part. When McNaughton tried to visit Sicily to observe the 1st Division in action, Montgomery refused, saying the 1st Canadian Division was operating as part of his Eighth Army and he not want McNaughton interfering with his operations. General Guy Simonds commanding the 1st Division supported Montgomery as he felt McNaughton would do more than "observe" his operations and it would be impossible for him to serve two commanders at once. McNaughton complained furiously about his exclusion from Sicily, saying that as the senior Canadian general in Europe that he had the right to visit Canadian troops wherever they were in Europe. The British found the Canadian nationalist McNaughton a "prickly" man to deal with, as McNaughton saw Canada as an equal power and not as a subordinate nation.

In September 1943, McNaughton clashed with Mackenzie King, when the Prime Minister decided that the 1st Canadian Division would stay with the British Eighth Army as it crossed over to the Italian mainland, and that he would send the 5th Canadian Armored Division and 1st Canadian Armoured Brigade and the headquarters for I Canadian Corps to Italy as well. In a memo to Defence Minister James Ralston, McNaughton wrote: "The important thing for Canada at the end of the war is to have her army together under the control of a Canadian". However, the prospect of the Canadians fighting in the "soft underbelly" of Italy, which King mistakenly believed would not involve too many losses and allowed the Canadians to win battlefield glory, was too attractive to King. McNaughton for his part, believed that all of the Canadian units in Europe should operate together as part of the First Canadian Army was incensed about losing an entire corps to the Eighth Army, and did little to disguise his fury that the Canadians would operate in both Italy and in north-west Europe when Operation Overlord was launched. McNaughton wrote the "dispersion of the Army" by taking away 1st Corps from his command would be bad for morale, and in a memo to Ralston suggested "it would be wise to put someone in control who believed in it [dispersion]". A further strain in relations with Ralston occurred when the Defence Minister passed along Brooke's opinion that McNaughton was unfit for field command, a judgement that deeply wounded McNaughton's ego. McNaughton believed that Ralston was responsible for Brooke's views, leading to the exchange of increasingly acrimonious telegrams between Ralston and McNaughton with the latter accusing the former of seeking to undermine his command.

A favourite of Winston Churchill, the British Prime Minister; though in October 1943 he came back from a weekend at Chequers looking limp and told Brooke that he had had a ghastly weekend .... kept up all hours of the morning. Brooke had warned him that Churchill might want him to agree to an operation against Norway (which had twice been turned down as impractical). While he had eventually agreed to examine the Trondheim operation, to Brooke's relief he had since sent a telegram to Mackenzie King that he was on no account to agree to the employment of the Canadian forces in any operations in Norway.

He was sent as envoy for a conference with Stalin. McNaughton, then a Major-General, was cover celebrity for Life magazine in December 1939 when Canada had entered the war, but the USA had not. His support for voluntary enlistment rather than conscription led to conflict with James Ralston, the then Minister of National Defence. McNaughton had taken the loss of I Canadian Corps to the Eighth Army very badly, leading to strained relations with Ralston while the British and Montgomery in particular made it clear that they did not want the First Canadian Army going into Operation Overlord, the invasion of France, under McNaugton's command. In December 1943, McNaughton was removed as commander of the First Canadian Army and the historian Desmond Morton wrote: "By the end of December, a fit and lively looking McNaughton returned to Canada, recalled on "on grounds of health". His successor, after a brief interlude, commanding the Canadian Corps in Italy, was Lieutenant-General Harry Crerar".

== Minister of National Defence ==
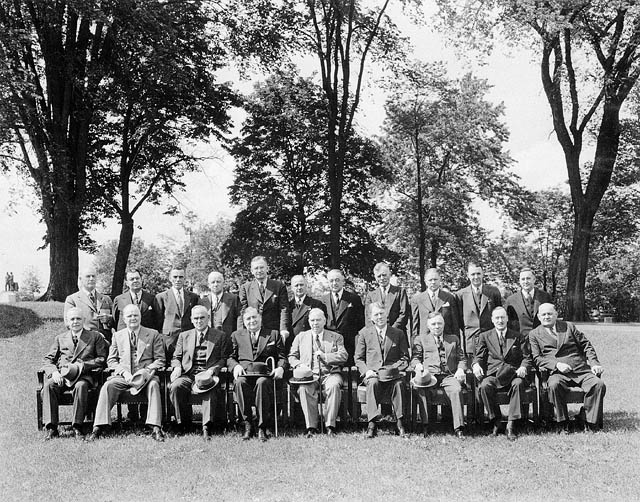
McNaughton and colleagues in the 16th Canadian Ministry (Rear, L-R): J.J. McCann, Paul Martin, Joseph Jean, J.A. Glen, Brooke Claxton, Alphonse Fournier, Ernest Bertrand, Andrew McNaughton, Lionel Chevrier, D.C. Abbott, D.L. MacLaren.

Because of his support for a volunteer army, McNaughton, now a full general, remained friendly with Prime Minister William Lyon Mackenzie King, who wanted to make him the first Canadian-born Governor General of Canada. Instead, McNaughton became Minister of National Defence when Ralston was forced to resign after the Conscription Crisis of 1944, as King did all he could to avoid introducing conscription. On the morning of 1 November 1944 Mackenzie King in effect fired Ralston as defence minister by accepting his resignation, which had been submitted in April 1942. The fact that McNaughton held anti-conscription views and had he and Ralston hated each other were additional benefits from Mackenzie King's viewpoint, but he appointed McNaughton primarily out of the belief that McNaughton by the sheer force of his personality could produce enough volunteers to go overseas and resolve the manpower shortages caused by heavy losses in Italy and north-west Europe.

In his first speech as Defence Minister, McNaughton declared his confidence that "the continuation of the voluntary system will produce the reinforcements". The Canadian historians Jack Granatstein and Desmond Morton noted: "The news of Ralston's sacking put the conscription crisis on the front pages in screaming headlines. To King's horror and to McNaughton's distress, the publicity created a firestorm of reaction against the once-popular general. Audiences booed and jeered when he tried to rally the country behind the no-conscription policy".

McNaughton tried to appeal to the "Zombies" (men who had been conscripted for the defence of Canada, so-called because they were soldiers who could not legally fight overseas) to volunteer for Europe, but his speeches failed to move his audiences, who instead booed him. One Zombie was quoted in the press as saying: "If Mackenzie King wants me to go overseas, he'll have to send me. I'm damned if I'll volunteer to help out this government". On the morning of 22 November 1944, General John Carl Murchie told McNaughton about the failure of his policy and that virtually no Zombies had volunteered to "go active", which McNaughton recalled "was like a blow to the stomach". Later on 22 November 1944, McNaughton telephoned King to say as the prime minister wrote in his diary: "The Headquarters staff here had all advised him that the voluntary system would not get the men...It was the most serious advice that could be tended". Mackenzie King chose to wildly misrepresent McNaughton's statement as some sort of military coup d'état, what in his own words was variously a "generals' revolt", a "palace revolution" and "the surrender of civil government to the military" as he now announced that because of the alleged "generals' revolt" that he was being forced against his will to send some 17,000 "Zombies" to the battlefields of Europe.

McNaughton was soon pressured into calling for conscription despite King's wishes, a popular move for some Canadians but an equally unpopular one for many others. As McNaughton was never elected to the House of Commons, on 22 November 1944, he had to go to the bar of the House of Commons to announce that some 17,000 Zombies were to go overseas if the House gave its approval. When word of the decision reached the "Zombie" soldiers stationed in Terrace, British Columbia who had guarding the Pacific coast against the unlikely event of a Japanese invasion, it resulted in the short-lived Terrace Mutiny. The mutiny was soon put down peacefully by General George Pearkes of the Pacific command who went to Terrace and advised the mutineers that the penalty for mutiny was death, but if they agreed to lay down their arms, no charges of mutiny would be pressed.

In early 1945, McNaughton sought election to the House of Commons as a Liberal in a by-election in the Ontario riding of Grey North. During the 1945 by-election, the Conservative candidate W. Garfield Case made much of the Catholicism of McNaughton's wife, claiming that the general was under the control of Mrs. McNaughton, whom in turn was taking her orders from the Pope. McNaughton's opposition to conscription was portrayed as a part of a Catholic plot to destroy the British and Protestant character of Canada by having only volunteers go overseas (who were very inaccurately portrayed as being only Protestant English-Canadians) where many would be killed while Catholics remained at home to "breed and breed". A Protestant fundamentalist minister, the Baptist Revered Thomas Todhunter Shields, who campaigned aggressively against McNaughton, warned in a speech in Owen Sound that "a vote for McNaughton is a vote for the Roman Catholic hierarchy and for the future enslavement of Canada". Shields portrayed Mrs. McNaughton as a sinister and malign influence on her husband, a charge that infuriated McNaughton who was furious that his wife should become the central issue in the by-election. Case in a speech stated that it was wrong for the "most British riding in Canada" to vote for McNaughton, whom he accused of pandering to Quebec, a province that was "lacking in courage, loyalty and resolve, a community which has deteriorated till we find them paying tribute to those who would hamper the war effort".

The decision to send only 17,000 Zombies (who were widely, if wrongly perceived to be mostly French-Canadian Catholics) to Europe was portrayed as a disaster with the claim being made in a speech by the Conservative leader John Bracken that most of the 17,000 had either deserted or thrown their rifles away, which was used to illustrate McNaughton's alleged weakness as a defence minister as he supposedly given orders not to prosecute the deserters. John Diefenbaker, then a first-term Conservative MP from Saskatchewan, campaigned hard for Case in Grey North, giving speeches where he claimed that Quebec was the province of deserters while Ontario was the province of volunteers and like Bracken claimed that McNaughton was a weak defence minister who was pandering to Quebec by his alleged order not to prosecute the thousands of Zombies who were said to have deserted since November. The fact that the Conservative leader Bracken personally campaigned in Grey North together with rising Conservative stars like Diefenbaker was a further advantage for Case while Mackenzie King and other prominent Liberals did not campaign for McNaughton.

The by-election of 5 February 1945 ended with McNaughton's defeat to Case, who was elected the MP for Grey North. McNaughton always believed that it was the issue of his wife's Catholicism that caused his defeat in Grey North, and that Mackenzie King had set up him for the defeat by having run for the House of Commons in a riding that was mostly rural and Protestant, instead of an urban riding where population was more diverse. The journalist John Marshall described Grey North as "typically Old Ontario" area that was rural, ardently Protestant and very committed to upholding the British connection, which led him to wonder why Mackenzie King had chosen to have McNaughton run in Grey North at all. Another journalist, Wilfried Eggleston, reported that had Mrs. McNaughton been a Protestant, the general would almost certainly had won the Grey North by-election, writing that this was "a deplorable factor in a country like Canada, but nobody denies that it is influential".

In the 1945 federal election, McNaughton ran again as a Liberal in the riding of Qu'Appelle, Saskatchewan, and was again defeated. McNaughton resigned as Defence minister in August 1945. King had made him take blame for conscription, to which both men had been opposed, and now had to replace him as Governor-General designate. King recommended to King George VI that the British Field Marshal Sir Harold Alexander be appointed Governor-General of Canada, setting back the first appointment of a Canadian to that role by seven more years.

McNaughton Avenue in Ottawa, Ontario, was named and dedicated to General Andrew McNaughton in 1943. The avenue runs from McGillivray Street to Main Street.

== After the war ==
By-election on 5 February 1945
Party	Candidate	Votes
Progressive Conservative	Case, Wilfrid Garfield	7,333
Liberal	McNaughton, Hon. Andrew George L.	6,097
Co-operative Commonwealth	Godfrey, Albert Earl	3,118

After the war McNaughton chaired the United Nations Atomic Energy Commission from 1946 to 1948; served as Canada's Ambassador to the United Nations from 1948 to 1949; and chaired the Canadian Section of the International Joint Commission from 1950 to 1962.

His son, Brigadier-General Edward Murray Dalziel Leslie (né McNaughton) was commander of 1st Regiment, Royal Canadian Horse Artillery and served during the Korean War.

His grandson Lieutenant-General Andrew Leslie was Chief of the Land Staff of the Canadian Forces from 2006 to 2010.

== Promotions ==
His promotions were:

- Lieutenant (9 May 1910)
- Captain (16 May 1911)
- Major (28 May 1913)
  - Brevet Brigadier-General (10 November 1918)
- Lieutenant-Colonel (1 January 1920)
- Colonel (1 January 1923)
- Major-General (1 January 1929)
- Lieutenant-General (1940)
- General (1944)

== Archives ==
There is an Andrew George Latta McNaughton collection at Library and Archives Canada and an Andrew G. L. McNaughton fonds at McGill University. There is a 3-volume biography "McNaughton" by John Alexander Swettenham. Volume 3 published by Ryerson Press in 1968

== Electoral record ==
1945 Canadian federal election: Qu'Appelle
Party	Candidate	Votes	%	±%
Co-operative Commonwealth	Gladys Strum	6,146	37.4	
Progressive Conservative	Ernest Perley	5,415	33.0	-21.9
Liberal	Gen. Andrew George Latta McNaughton	4,871	29.6	-15.5
Total valid votes		16,432	100.0	

Note: Progressive Conservative vote is compared to "National Government" vote in 1940 election. Social Credit vote is compared to New Democracy vote in 1940 election.

== See also ==
- List of Bishop's College School alumni
- Canadian pipe mine

== Sources ==
- Anderson, Kevin (2019). Not Quite Us Anti-Catholic Thought in English Canada Since 1900. Montreal: McGill University Press. ISBN 9780773556553.
- Cook, Tim (2012). Warlords: Borden Mackenzie King And Canada's World Wars. AllanLane. ISBN 978-0670065219.
- Berton, Pierre (1986). Vimy. London: Penguin. ISBN 0-14-010439-9.
- Creighton, Donald (1976). The Forked Road. Toronto: McClelland & Stewart.
- English, John (2000). Failure in High Command The Canadian Army and the Normandy Campaign. Golden Dog Press. ISBN 0-919614-60-4.
- English, John (1991). Failure in High Command. Ottawa: Golden Dog.
- Granatstein, Jack (2005) [1993]. The Generals: The Canadian Army's Senior Commanders in the Second World War. University of Calgary Press. ISBN 978-1-55238-176-2.
- Granatstein, Jack (2016). The Weight of Command Voices of Canada's Second World War Generals and Those Who Knew Them. Vancouver: University of British Columbia Press. ISBN 9780774833028.
- Morton, Desmond (1999). A Military History of Canada. McClelland & Stewart. ISBN 0-7710-6514-0.
- Morton, Desmond; Granatstein, Jack (2003). Canada and the Two World Wars. Toronto: KeyPorter. ISBN 1552635090.
- Rickard, John Nelson (2010). The Politics of Command Lieutenant-General A.G.L. McNaughton and the Canadian Army, 1939-1943. Toronto: University of Toronto Press. ISBN 9781442640023.
- Swettenham, John (1968). McNaughton. Vol. 3 volumes. Ryerson Press. ISBN 978-0-7700-0238-1.

Military offices
Preceded by Herbert Thacker	Chief of the General Staff; 1929–1935	Succeeded by Ernest Ashton
New post	GOC 1st Canadian Infantry Division; 1939–1940	Succeeded by George Pearkes
New post	GOC VII Corps; July 1940 – December 1940	Succeeded by Corps renamed Canadian Corps
Preceded by Corps renamed from VII Corps	GOC Canadian Corps; 1940–1941	Succeeded by Harry Crerar
Preceded by New post	GOC First Canadian Army; 1942–1943	Succeeded by Harry Crerar
Diplomatic posts
Preceded by Position created	Canadian Ambassador to the United Nations; January 1948 – December 1949	Succeeded by John W. Holmes
