= Percy Verner Noble =

Canadian politician

Official 1968 portrait

Percy Verner Noble (18 December 1902 – 19 June 1996) was a Canadian politician who served as a Progressive Conservative Member of Parliament.

Noble was born in Shallow Lake, Ontario, the first of 11 children in his family. He initially trained for his father's career as a blacksmith. After subsequent work in the farming, railway and coal industries, he would eventually settle in the mink farming business. He also raised eight children with his wife, Kathleen.

He was first elected in 1957 in the Grey North riding for the 23rd Canadian Parliament. He was re-elected in consecutive elections until the 28th Canadian Parliament which ended in 1972. The riding was realigned as Grey—Simcoe for his final term in Parliament. Following Noble's retirement from federal politics, his successor in Parliament was Gus Mitges, also of the Progressive Conservative party.

== Electoral record ==
1957 Canadian federal election: Grey North
Party	Candidate	Votes
Progressive Conservative	Percy Verner Noble	12,240
Liberal	Edward Carson Sargent	7,096
Co-operative Commonwealth	Stanley James Hutchinson	1,265

1958 Canadian federal election: Grey North
Party	Candidate	Votes
Progressive Conservative	Percy Verner Noble	12,240
Liberal	George Arthur Marron	5,990
Co-operative Commonwealth	Stanley James Hutchinson	1,265

1962 Canadian federal election: Grey North
Party	Candidate	Votes
Progressive Conservative	Percy Verner Noble	9,890
Liberal	Douglas Hay Bovell	6,078
New Democratic	John Carter Stevenson	2,713
Social Credit	William Thomas Walker	298

1963 Canadian federal election: Grey North
Party	Candidate	Votes
Progressive Conservative	Percy Verner Noble	9,804
Liberal	Arthur Pratt Harrison	6,819
New Democratic	John Carter Stevenson	1,967
Social Credit	David Almour Clarke	525

1965 Canadian federal election: Grey North
Party	Candidate	Votes
Progressive Conservative	Percy Verner Noble	9,222
Liberal	John Collins Finley	7,003
New Democratic	John Carter Stevenson	2,510
