= William Albert Boucher =

Canadian politician

Member of Parliament for Rosthern
- In office 1948–1953
- Preceded by: Walter Adam Tucker
- Succeeded by: Walter Adam Tucker

Personal details
- Born: November 12, 1889 St. Louis, Northwest Territories, Canada
- Died: June 23, 1976 (aged 86) Quebec, Canada
- Party: Liberal
- Spouse: Hedwidge Marion
- Occupation: Politician; farmer; merchant

William Albert Boucher (November 12, 1889 – June 23, 1976) was a Métis politician, farmer and merchant.

== Early life ==
He was born in St. Louis in what is now Saskatchewan but was, at the time, part of the North West Territories. His brother-in-law was Saskatchewan Liberal MLA Arthur Jules Marion.

== Political career ==
He was elected to the House of Commons of Canada as a Member of the Liberal Party in 1948 to represent the riding of Rosthern after the resignation of Walter Adam Tucker on June 8, 1948, and a by-election next October 25. He won the election of 1949. He did not run for re-election in 1953.

In 1957, Boucher was then appointed to the senate on the advice of Prime Minister Louis St. Laurent and represented the Senate division of Prince Albert, Saskatchewan, until his death. During his tenure in the Senate, he was a member of numerous Senate committees including the Standing Committees on Rules and Orders, External Relations, Immigration and Labour, Natural Resources, and on Public Health and Welfare, as well as the Special Committee on Criminal Code (Hate Propaganda).
