= Grey North (federal electoral district) =

Former federal electoral district in Ontario, Canada

Ontario electoral district

Defunct federal electoral district
- Legislature: House of Commons
- District created: 1867
- District abolished: 1966
- First contested: 1867
- Last contested: 1965

Grey North was a federal electoral district represented in the House of Commons of Canada from 1867 to 1968. It was located in the province of Ontario. It was created by the British North America Act 1867, which divided the County of Grey into two ridings: Grey South and Grey North. The North Riding consisted of the Townships of Collingwood, Euphrasia, Holland, Saint-Vincent, Sydenham, Sullivan, Derby, and Keppel, Sarawak and Brooke, and the Town of Owen Sound.

In 1872, the County of Grey was divided into three ridings when Grey East was created. The North Riding consisted of the Townships of Holland, Sullivan, Sydenham, Derby, Sarawak, Keppel and the Town of Owen Sound.

In 1903, the Townships of Holland and Sullivan were excluded from the riding, and the townships of Keppel and St. Vincent and the town of Meaford were incorporated into the riding.

In 1914, the county of Grey was again divided into two ridings. The north riding consisted of the towns of Owen Sound, Meaford and Thornbury, and the townships of Sydenham, Keppel, Derby, Sarawak, St. Vincent, Collingwood and Euphrasia.

In 1924, the riding was redefined as consisting of the part of the county of Grey lying north of and including the townships of Derby, Sydenham, Euphrasia, and the town of Collingwood.

In 1933, the riding was redefined as consisting of the part of the county of Grey contained in the townships of Collingwood, Derby, Euphrasia, Holland, Keppel, Osprey, St. Vincent and Sydenham, and including the city of Owen Sound.

In 1947, the riding was redefined to include the township of Sarawak and Sydenham, and excluding the village of Chatsworth.

The electoral district was abolished in 1966 when it was redistributed between Bruce and Grey—Simcoe ridings.

== Members of Parliament ==
This riding elected the following members of the House of Commons of Canada:

| Parliament | Years | Member | Party |
|---|---|---|---|
| 1st | 1867–1872 | George Snider | Liberal |
| 2nd | 1872–1874 | George Snider | Liberal |
| 3rd | 1874–1878 | George Snider | Liberal |
| 4th | 1878–1882 | Samuel Johnathan Lane | Conservative |
| 5th | 1882–1887 | Benjamin Allen | Liberal |
| 6th | 1887–1891 | James Masson | Conservative |
| 7th | 1891–1896 | James Masson | Conservative |
| 8th | 1896–1896† | John Clark | Liberal |
| 8th | 1896–1900 | William Paterson | Liberal |
| 9th | 1900–1902† | Edward Henry Horsey | Liberal |
| 9th | 1903–1904 | Thomas Inkerman Thomson | Conservative |
| 10th | 1904–1908 | William Pattison Telford Sr. | Liberal |
| 11th | 1908–1911 | William Sora Middlebro | Conservative |
| 12th | 1911–1917 | William Sora Middlebro | Conservative |
| 13th | 1917–1921 | William Sora Middlebro | Government (Unionist) |
| 14th | 1921–1925 | Matthew Robert Duncan | Conservative |
| 15th | 1925–1926 | Matthew Robert Duncan | Conservative |
| 16th | 1926–1930 | William Pattison Telford Jr. | Liberal |
| 17th | 1930–1935 | Victor Porteous | Conservative |
| 18th | 1935–1940 | William Pattison Telford Jr. | Liberal |
| 19th | 1940–1944 | William Pattison Telford Jr. | Liberal |
| 19th | 1945–1945 | W. Garfield Case | Progressive Conservative |
| 20th | 1945–1949 | W. Garfield Case | Progressive Conservative |
| 21st | 1949–1953 | Colin Emerson Bennett | Liberal |
| 22nd | 1953–1957 | Colin Emerson Bennett | Liberal |
| 23rd | 1957–1958 | Percy Verner Noble | Progressive Conservative |
| 24th | 1958–1962 | Percy Verner Noble | Progressive Conservative |
| 25th | 1962–1963 | Percy Verner Noble | Progressive Conservative |
| 26th | 1963–1965 | Percy Verner Noble | Progressive Conservative |
| 27th | 1965–1968 | Percy Verner Noble | Progressive Conservative |
Riding dissolved into Bruce and Grey—Simcoe

== Election results ==
1867 Canadian federal election
| Party | Candidate | Votes |
|---|---|---|
| Liberal | George Snider | 1,399 |
| Unknown | D'Arcy Boulton | 1,143 |
| Eligible voters | | 3,478 |
Source: Canadian Parliamentary Guide, 1871

1872 Canadian federal election
| Party | Candidate | Votes |
|---|---|---|
| Liberal | George Snider | 1,124 |
| Unknown | J. Chisholm | 983 |
Source: Canadian Elections Database

1874 Canadian federal election
| Party | Candidate | Votes |
|---|---|---|
| Liberal | George Snider | 1,320 |
| Unknown | Samuel Johnathan Lane | 1,241 |

1878 Canadian federal election
| Party | Candidate | Votes |
|---|---|---|
| Conservative | Samuel Johnathan Lane | 1,607 |
| Liberal | George Snider | 1,394 |

1882 Canadian federal election
| Party | Candidate | Votes |
|---|---|---|
| Liberal | Benjamin Allen | 1,457 |
| Unknown | Samuel Johnathan Lane | 1,385 |

1887 Canadian federal election
| Party | Candidate | Votes |
|---|---|---|
| Conservative | James Masson | 2,128 |
| Liberal | Benjamin Allen | 2,071 |

1891 Canadian federal election
| Party | Candidate | Votes |
|---|---|---|
| Conservative | James Masson | 2,511 |
| Liberal | Edward Henry Horsey | 2,264 |

1896 Canadian federal election
| Party | Candidate | Votes |
|---|---|---|
| Liberal | John Clark | 2,559 |
| Conservative | James McLaughlin | 2,527 |

On Mr. Clark's death, 27 July 1896, before the opening of the 9th Parliament:

By-election on 25 August 1896
| Party | Candidate | Votes |
| Liberal | William Paterson | 2,840 |
| Conservative | James McLaughlan | 2,416 |

1900 Canadian federal election
| Party | Candidate | Votes |
|---|---|---|
| Liberal | Edward Henry Horsey | 2,834 |
| Conservative | Charles Gordon | 2,815 |

On Mr. Horsey's death, 23 July 1902:

By-election on 24 February 1903
| Party | Candidate | Votes |
| Conservative | Thomas Inkerman Thomson | 3,018 |
| Liberal | Matthew Kennedy | 2,855 |

1904 Canadian federal election
| Party | Candidate | Votes |
|---|---|---|
| Liberal | William Pattison Telford Sr. | 2,975 |
| Conservative | Thomas Inkerman Thomson | 2,952 |

1908 Canadian federal election
| Party | Candidate | Votes |
|---|---|---|
| Conservative | William Sora Middlebro | 2,923 |
| Liberal | William Pattison Telford Sr. | 2,777 |

1911 Canadian federal election
| Party | Candidate | Votes |
|---|---|---|
| Conservative | William Sora Middlebro | 3,326 |
| Liberal | Frederick William Harrison | 2,974 |

1917 Canadian federal election
| Party | Candidate | Votes |
|---|---|---|
| Government (Unionist) | William Sora Middlebro | 5,815 |
| Opposition (Laurier Liberals) | Arthur Leslie Danard | 3,521 |

1921 Canadian federal election
| Party | Candidate | Votes |
|---|---|---|
| Conservative | Matthew Robert Duncan | 5,741 |
| Progressive | Thomas John Rutherford | 5,538 |
| Liberal | William Pattison Telford Jr. | 3,675 |

1925 Canadian federal election
| Party | Candidate | Votes |
|---|---|---|
| Conservative | Matthew Robert Duncan | 6,861 |
| Progressive | Dougall Carmichael | 6,415 |

1926 Canadian federal election
| Party | Candidate | Votes |
|---|---|---|
| Liberal | William Pattison Telford Jr. | 7,606 |
| Conservative | Matthew Robert Duncan | 7,042 |

1930 Canadian federal election
| Party | Candidate | Votes |
|---|---|---|
| Conservative | Victor Porteous | 7,617 |
| Liberal | William Pattison Telford Jr. | 7,430 |

1935 Canadian federal election
| Party | Candidate | Votes |
|---|---|---|
| Liberal | William Pattison Telford Jr. | 8,060 |
| Conservative | Victor Porteous | 6,740 |
| Reconstruction | William Lawrence Taylor | 1,792 |
| Co-operative Commonwealth | Hudson Stout | 1,221 |

1940 Canadian federal election
| Party | Candidate | Votes |
|---|---|---|
| Liberal | William Pattison Telford Jr. | 7,538 |
| National Government | Victor Porteous | 5,771 |
| National Liberal Progressive | W. Garfield Case | 2,434 |

On Mr. Telford's resignation, 9 December 1944, to provide a vacancy for A.G.L. McNaughton:

By-election on 5 February 1945
| Party | Candidate | Votes |
| Progressive Conservative | W. Garfield Case | 7,333 |
| Liberal | Andrew McNaughton | 6,097 |
| Co-operative Commonwealth | Albert Earl Godfrey | 3,118 |

1945 Canadian federal election
| Party | Candidate | Votes |
|---|---|---|
| Progressive Conservative | W. Garfield Case | 9,204 |
| Liberal | Findlay MacDonald | 7,570 |
| Co-operative Commonwealth | David T. Waddell | 1,145 |
| Social Credit | Ron Gostick | 250 |

1949 Canadian federal election
| Party | Candidate | Votes |
|---|---|---|
| Liberal | Colin Emerson Bennett | 9,949 |
| Progressive Conservative | W. Garfield Case | 7,589 |
| Co-operative Commonwealth | Elgin MacNab | 1,354 |

1953 Canadian federal election
| Party | Candidate | Votes |
|---|---|---|
| Liberal | Colin Emerson Bennett | 8,368 |
| Progressive Conservative | W. Garfield Case | 7,293 |
| Co-operative Commonwealth | Lorna Ellen Elliott | 1,417 |
| Social Credit | Stanley Ross Patterson | 342 |

1957 Canadian federal election
| Party | Candidate | Votes |
|---|---|---|
| Progressive Conservative | Percy Verner Noble | 12,240 |
| Liberal | Edward Carson Sargent | 7,096 |
| Co-operative Commonwealth | Stanley James Hutchinson | 1,265 |

1958 Canadian federal election
| Party | Candidate | Votes |
|---|---|---|
| Progressive Conservative | Percy Verner Noble | 12,240 |
| Liberal | George Arthur Marron | 5,990 |
| Co-operative Commonwealth | Stanley James Hutchinson | 1,265 |

1962 Canadian federal election
| Party | Candidate | Votes |
|---|---|---|
| Progressive Conservative | Percy Verner Noble | 9,890 |
| Liberal | Douglas Hay Bovell | 6,078 |
| New Democratic | John Carter Stevenson | 2,713 |
| Social Credit | William Thomas Walker | 298 |

1963 Canadian federal election
| Party | Candidate | Votes |
|---|---|---|
| Progressive Conservative | Percy Verner Noble | 9,804 |
| Liberal | Arthur Pratt Harrison | 6,819 |
| New Democratic | John Carter Stevenson | 1,967 |
| Social Credit | David Almour Clarke | 525 |

1965 Canadian federal election
| Party | Candidate | Votes |
|---|---|---|
| Progressive Conservative | Percy Verner Noble | 9,222 |
| Liberal | John Collins Finley | 7,003 |
| New Democratic | John Carter Stevenson | 2,510 |

== See also ==
- List of Canadian electoral districts
- Historical federal electoral districts of Canada
