= Albert Earl Godfrey =

Canadian First World War flying ace

- Born: 27 July 1890; Killarney, Manitoba, Canada
- Died: 1 January 1982 (aged 91); Kingston, Ontario, Canada
- Military career
- Allegiance: Canada
- Branch: Royal Flying Corps; Royal Canadian Air Force
- Rank: Air Vice-Marshal
- Nickname: Steve
- Units: No. 10 Squadron RFC, No. 25 Squadron RFC, No. 40 Squadron RFC, No. 44 (Home Defence) Squadron RFC, No. 78 (Home Defence) Squadron RFC, Canadian Training Brigade
- Awards: Military Cross, Air Force Cross

Air Vice-Marshal Albert Earl "Steve" Godfrey MC (27 July 1890 – 1 January 1982) was a Canadian First World War flying ace, officially credited with 14 victories while flying for the Royal Flying Corps. He spent the remainder of his career in the Royal Canadian Air Force.

== Early life and service ==
Godfrey was the son of Nellie and Christopher Godfrey. He was building his own airplane when World War I began. He jumped at the chance to volunteer for the Royal Flying Corps. He was told he would be accepted if he could pay for his own flight training. As he was unable to do this, he enlisted, originally in the 11th Mounted Rifles CEF in January 1915, then in the 1st Pioneer Battalion CEF of the Canadian Expeditionary Force. He arrived in England in November 1915. While there, he tried to take flying lessons, but his commanding officer would not allow him the time off from his duties. He shipped off to France, and served in the trenches until mid-1916. He finally arranged a transfer to the RFC as an aerial observer.

== Aerial service ==
Godfrey served as an observer/gunner in both 10 and 25 Squadrons, and tallied his first win by driving a Roland fighter down out of control on 16 October 1916. He then finally got his chance at pilot's training. Once he received his wings, he was assigned to 40 Squadron to fly a Nieuport. On 28 May 1917, he shared another "out of control" victory over an Albatros D.III while teaming with William Arthur Bond. Then, still using Nieuport 17 serial number B1684, between 1 June and 14 August 1917, he ran off a string of eleven wins—nine versus Albatros D.III fighters and two against two-seater reconnaissance machines. He then switched to Nieuport 24 serial number B3601 for his final win on 22 August 1917. A summary of his victories shows he destroyed four enemy planes and drove down ten out of control. This sufficed for a MC.

He was then withdrawn to Home Establishment to serve in 44 and 78 Squadrons until April 1918. He then returned home to serve with the Canadian Training Brigade, which he did through war's end.

In September 1926, American aviator James Dalzell McKee and Squadron Leader Godfrey flew from Montreal to Vancouver over nine days, pioneering trans-Canada aviation.

== Text of citations ==
=== Military Cross ===
"Temp. 2nd Lt. Albert Earl Godfrey, Gen. List, and R.F.C. For conspicuous gallantry and devotion to duty in constantly attacking hostile machines at close range, regardless of personal risk or of their being in superior numbers."

== Later military career ==
Godfrey transferred from the Royal Flying Corps to the newly created Royal Canadian Air Force after World War I, and won an Air Force Cross. By the beginning of World War II, he was serving at the Imperial Defence College as a Group Captain. In September 1944, having been promoted to Vice Air Marshall and in the role of RCAF Inspector General, he took part in a convoy protection patrol in Consolidated B-24 Liberator. With no passenger seats available he took the position of waist gunner. The bomber spotted German submarine U-422 and attacked, with Godfrey becoming the highest ranking officer to directly engage the enemy during the war. The submarine dived after a 30 minute exchange of gunfire. It was sunk two weeks later.

He attained the rank of Air Vice-Marshal during World War II before retiring in 1944.

== Political career ==
Godfrey ran as the Co-operative Commonwealth Federation's candidate in the February 1945 Grey North by-election against General Andrew McNaughton who had been appointed Minister of Defence the previous November and was contesting the by-election for the Liberal Party of Canada. While Godfrey placed third, General McNaughton was upset in the by-election by the Progressive Conservative candidate with Godfrey, whose vote total was less than the difference between McNaughton and the Conservative candidate, acting as spoiler.
