= Gus Mitges =

Canadian politician

Member of Parliament for Grey—Simcoe
- In office 1972–1993

Personal details
- Born: Constantine George Mitges; 5 February 1919 Psili Vrisi, Greece
- Died: 1 November 2009 (aged 90) Guelph, Ontario
- Party: Progressive Conservative
- Profession: Veterinarian

Constantine George "Gus" Mitges, B.V.Sc., D.V.M., V.S. (5 February 1919 – 1 November 2009) was a Greek-Canadian member of the House of Commons of Canada from 1972 to 1993. By career, he was a veterinarian.

Mitges was born in Psili Vrisi, Greece. He came to Canada at the age of six and grew up in Guelph. A veterinarian by profession, he entered politics when he served as a school board member. In 1966, he was elected as an alderman in Owen Sound, where he served until his election to the House of Commons.

Mitges was elected to Parliament in the 1972 federal election for the Progressive Conservative Party in the riding of Grey—Simcoe. He was subsequently re-elected for consecutive terms until the 1988 federal election, serving from the 29th through the 34th Canadian Parliaments. After ridings were rearranged in 1987, Mitges sought re-election for his final political term in the Bruce—Grey riding. He left federal politics in 1993, not seeking re-election in that year's federal election.

In 1986 Mitges introduced a private member's motion calling on the government to amend the Constitution of Canada to enshrine fetal rights in Section 7 of the Canadian Charter of Rights and Freedoms, which if enacted would constitutionally limit access to abortion in Canada. The motion was debated in 1987 and was defeated on a vote of 62 to 89.

He was married twice: first to Velma Martin and later to Yolanda Odorico. Mitges was president of the Owen Sound Little Theatre and served as a director of Theatre Ontario in 1971. In 1995, he was named a Commander of the Greek Order of the Phoenix.

On 1 November 2009, Mitges died at Guelph General Hospital, aged 90.
