= Peter J. Hooge =

Canadian politician

Peter J. Hooge (July 5, 1886 – April 13, 1963) was a lawyer, judge and political figure in Saskatchewan. He represented Rosthern from 1944 to 1948 in the Legislative Assembly of Saskatchewan as a Liberal.

He was born in Winkler, Manitoba, the son of Johann Hooge, a farmer of Dutch descent who had come to Canada from Russia. Hooge was educated in Winkler, in Gretna and at the University of Manitoba, where he received a LLB degree. He taught school in Altona, Manitoba and Herbert, Saskatchewan. Hooge was called to the Saskatchewan bar in 1914 and went on to practise law in Saskatoon, Leader and Rosthern. He married Margaret Matchuk in 1917. Hooge served several years as secretary for the Rosthern Board of Trade. In 1937, he was named King's Counsel. After retiring from politics in 1948, he was named to the district court for Moosomin. In 1961, he retired to British Columbia. Hooge was called to the British Columbia bar in 1962. He died a year later in Vancouver at the age of 76.

Hooge Island in northern Saskatchewan was named in his honour.
