= Isaak Elias =

Canadian politician

Isaak Elias (April 27, 1912 – May 1, 1998) was an educator, merchant and political figure in Saskatchewan. He represented Rosthern from 1956 to 1960 in the Legislative Assembly of Saskatchewan as a Social Credit member.

He was born in Rosthern, Saskatchewan. He taught in rural public schools. In 1934, Elias married Annie Epp. In 1946, he retired from teaching due to poor health and entered the retail business. He was manager for the Hepburn Co-operative Association, then managed a store in Langham and later worked in the bankruptcy department of Touche Ross & Company. Elias also served on the local school board. In 1953, he was an unsuccessful Social Credit Party of Canada candidate for the Rosthern seat in the Canadian House of Commons.
