= William Sora Middlebro =

Canadian politician

William Sora Middlebro (October 17, 1868 – November 17, 1948) was a lawyer and political figure in Ontario, Canada. He represented Grey North in the House of Commons of Canada from 1908 to 1917 as a Conservative and then from 1917 to 1921 as a Unionist Party member.

He was born in Orangeville, Ontario, the son of John Middlebro, and was educated there and at Osgoode Hall. Middlebro was called to the Ontario bar in 1892. He was mayor of Owen Sound from 1905 to 1909. Middlebro was president and chairman of the board of directors for the Grey and Bruce Trust and Savings Company. He was named King's Counsel in 1910. Middlebro served as government whip from 1917 to 1921. He was married twice: to Laura J. Tretheway in 1901 and to Pearl Irene Ryan in 1913.
