= Thomas Inkerman Thomson =

Canadian politician

Thomas Inkerman Thomson (March 21, 1855 – February 9, 1919) was a hardware merchant and political figure in Ontario, Canada. He represented Grey North in the House of Commons of Canada from 1903 to 1904 as a Conservative.

He was born in Napanee, Canada West, the son of John Thomson and Annie Oswald, both natives of Ireland, and was educated in Uxbridge. In 1877, Thomson married Maggie Walden. He served as reeve and then mayor of Owen Sound. Thomson was elected to the House of Commons in a 1903 by-election held after the death of Edward Henry Horsey. He was defeated when he ran for reelection in 1904.
