= List of CCF/NDP members =

This is a list of members of the Co-operative Commonwealth Federation (CCF), and its successor, the New Democratic Party (NDP), social democratic political parties in Canada.

See also List of Labour MPs (Canada), List of Progressive/United Farmer MPs

== Articles on former and current Members of Parliament ==
=== 1932 party founding ===
MPs who joined the CCF at its founding in 1932 were members of the Ginger Group.

- George Gibson Coote – accountant, Macleod, Alberta – United Farmers of Alberta MP (elected 1921, 1925 Progressive Party, 1926, 1930 UFA, def CCF 1935)
- Robert Gardiner – farmer, Acadia, Alberta – United Farmers of Alberta MP (elected 1921, 1925 Progressive Party, 1926, 1930 UFA, def CCF 1935)
- Ted Garland – farmer, Bow River, Alberta – United Farmers of Alberta MP (elected 1921, 1925 Progressive Party, 1926, 1930 UFA, def CCF 1935)
- William Irvine – author, clergyman, farmer, Wetaskiwin, Alberta – United Farmers of Alberta MP (elected 1917, 1921, 1925 Labour, 1926, 1930 UFA, def CCF 1935)
- Donald MacBeth Kennedy – farmer, Peace River, Alberta – United Farmers of Alberta MP (elected 1921, 1925 Progressive Party, 1926, 1930 UFA, def CCF 1935)
- Michael Luchkovich – teacher, Vegreville, Alberta – United Farmers of Alberta MP (elected 1926, 1930 UFA, def CCF 1935)
- Alfred Speakman – farmer, Red Deer, Alberta – United Farmers of Alberta MP (elected 1921, 1925, 1926, 1930 UFA, def CCF 1935)
- Henry Elvins Spencer – farmer, printer, publisher, Battle River, Alberta – United Farmers of Alberta MP (elected 1921, 1925 Progressive Party, 1926, 1930 UFA, def CCF 1935)
- Angus MacInnis – auto mechanic, street car driver, union leader, school trustee, alderman – Vancouver East – Independent Labour MP 1930, 1935, CCF MP 1935, 1940, 1945, 1949, 1953 (retired, CCF won Harold Edward Winch)
- Abraham Albert Heaps – upholsterer – Winnipeg North – Labour MP 1925, 1926, 1930, 1935, CCF MP 1935 (ran. 1940, CCF lost)
- James Shaver Woodsworth – minister, lecturer – Labour MP Winnipeg Centre 1921, Winnipeg North Centre 1925, 1926, 1930, CCF MP Winnipeg Centre 1935 Winnipeg North Centre 1940 (died 1942, CCF won Stanley Knowles)
- Agnes Macphail – teacher, president of the Ontario CCF – Progressive – Grey-Bruce – (elected 1921, 1925, 1926, 1930 Progressive Party, 1935 United Farmers of Ontario-Labour def. 1940) Macphail was never elected as a CCF MP but sat with the CCF caucus. Later elected CCF MPP to the Ontario legislature 1943–1945 and 1948–1951

=== 1935 general election ===
Seven MPs were elected as CCFers were elected in the 1935 election. In addition to incumbent MPs A.A. Heaps, Angus MacInnis and J.S. Woodsworth four new MPs are elected. As well, Agnes Macphail, was elected as a "United Farmers of Ontario–Labour" MP but sat with the CCF caucus. Many of these MPs were formerly members of the Ginger Group

- J.S. Woodsworth re-elected
- A.A. Heaps re-elected
- Angus MacInnis re-elected
- James Samuel Taylor – assistant/secretary – CCF – Nanaimo, B.C. – MP elected 1935, became an independent in 1937, did not run 1940, CCF lost)
- Charles Grant MacNeil – assistant/secretary – CCF – Vancouver Centre – MP 1935 (ran 1940 in Vancouver North, CCF lost)
- Major James Coldwell – teacher – CCF – Rosetown-Biggar, Saskatchewan – MP 1935, 1940, 1945, 1949, 1953, 1957 (ran 1958, CCF lost)
- Tommy Douglas – minister/clergyman – CCF – Weyburn, Saskatchewan – MP 1935, 1940 (resigned 1944 to lead Saskatchewan CCF, CCF won Eric Bowness McKay), Burnaby-Coquitlam 1962 (by-election), 1963, 1965, (ran 1968, NDP lost), Nanaimo-Cowichan-the Islands 1969 (by-election) – 1972, 1974 (retired 1979, NDP lost)

Additionally, Percy John Rowe was elected as a Social Credit MP in Athabasca in 1935 but ran for re-election under the CCF banner in 1940 and was defeated.

=== 1940 general election ===
Four CCFers were elected for the first time in the 1940 election, and four (Woodsworth, MacInnis, Coldwell, Douglas) were re-elected, for a total of eight MPs:

- George Hugh Castleden – teacher – CCF – Yorkton, Saskatchewan – MP 1940, 1945 (ran 1949, CCF lost) returned 1953, 1957 (ran 1958, CCF lost)
- Clarence Gillis – miner/union official – CCF – Cape Breton South – MP 1940, 1945, 1949, 1953, (ran 1957, CCF lost)
- Alexander Malcolm Nicholson – clergyman/farmer – CCF – Mackenzie, Saskatchewan – MP 1940, 1945 (ran 1949, CCF lost), 1953, 1957 (ran 1958, CCF lost)
- Percy Ellis Wright – farmer – CCF – Melfort, Saskatchewan – MP 1940, 1945, 1949 (Ridings merged and Wright ran in Melville (electoral district), CCF lost)

=== 1942 by-elections ===
Three CCFers were elected for the first time in by-elections in 1942, for a total of ten MPs in House of Commons. By-election in Winnipeg North Centre caused by death of Woodsworth.

- William Bryce – farmer – CCF – Selkirk, Manitoba – MP 1942, 1945, 1949 (ran 1953, CCF lost) by-election – 1954, 1957 (ran 1958, CCF lost)
- Stanley Knowles – minister, printer & organizer – CCF – Winnipeg North Centre – MP 1942, 194, 1949, 1953, 1957, (ran 1958) ret. 1962, 1963, 1965, 1968, 1972, 1974, 1979, 1980 (retired 1984, NDP Won)
- Joseph Noseworthy – teacher – CCF – York South, Ontario – MP 1942 (def. 1945, CCF lost), returned 1949, 1953 (died 1956, CCF lost in 1957 g.e.)

=== 1943 by-election ===
One CCFer was elected for the first time in a by-election in 1943, for a total of eleven MPs:

- Joseph William Burton – farmer, former MLA – CCF – Humboldt, Saskatchewan – MP 1943, 1945 (ran 1949, CCF lost)

=== 1945 general election ===
Twenty CCFers were elected for the first time in the 1945 election. With the nine who were re-elected, the party won a total of 29 seats including one "Independent CCF" MP).

- James Herbert Matthews – minister/clergyman – CCF – Kootenay East, BC – MP 1945 (ran 1949, CCF lost)
- Herbert Wilfred Herridge – tree farmer/former MLA – Independent CCF (beating official CCFer) 1945 – Kootenay West, BC – MP re-elected as CCF and later NDP 1949, 1953, 1957, 1958, 1962, 1963, 1965 (retired 1968, NDP won Randolph Harding)
- Harry Grenfell Archibald – seaman – CCF – Skeena, BC – MP 1945 (ran 1949, CCF lost)
- Ronald Moore – active service military – CCF – Churchill, Manitoba – MP 1945 (ran 1949, CCF lost)
- Fred Zaplitny – teacher – CCF – Dauphin, Manitoba – MP 1945 (ran 1949, CCF lost), returned 1953, 1957 (ran 1958, CCF lost)
- Alistair McLeod Stewart – accountant – CCF – Winnipeg North – MP 1945, 1949, 1953, 1957 (ran 1958, CCF lost)
- Edward George McCullough – farmer – CCF – Assinibola, Saskatchewan – MP 1945 (1949, ridings merged, ran in different riding, CCF won Assinbola Hazen Argue, but McCullough lost), Moose Mountain 1953, 1957 (ran 1958, CCF lost)
- Frank Eric Jaenicke – barrister – CCF – Kindersley, Saskatchewan – MP 1945 (ran 1949, CCF lost)
- Duncan John McCuaig – farmer – CCF – Maple Creek, Saskatchewan – MP 1945 (retired 1949, Ridings merged, CCF lost)
- Ross Thatcher – merchant – CCF – Moose Jaw, Saskatchewan – MP 1945, 1949, Moose Jaw-Lake Centre 1953 (became an independent 1955, ran as Liberal in another riding in 1957, CCFer Louis Lewry won old riding)
- Frederick Townley-Smith – farmer – CCF – North Battleford, Saskatchewan – MP 1945 (retired 1949, Ridings Merged, CCF lost)
- Edward LeRoy Bowerman – farmer – CCF – Prince Albert, Saskatchewan – MP 1945 (ran 1949, CCF lost)
- Gladys Strum – housewife – CCF – Qu'Appelle, Saskatchewan – MP 1945 (ran 1949, CCF lost)
- John Oliver Probe – teacher – CCF – Regina City, Saskatchewan – MP 1945 (ran 1949, CCF lost)
- Robert Ross (Roy) Knight – teacher – CCF – Saskatoon City, Saskatchewan – MP 1945, Saskatoon 1949, 1953 (ran 1957, CCF lost)
- Thomas Bentley – agriculturist – CCF – Swift Current, Saskatchewan – MP 1945 (ran 1949, CCF lost)
- Max Campbell – manager – CCF – the Battlefords, Saskatchewan – MP 1945 (ran 1949, CCF lost) returned 1953, 1957 (ran 1958, CCF lost)
- Eric Bowness McKay – teacher – CCF – Weyburn, Saskatchewan – MP 1945 (1949, riding merged with Maple Creek, ran, CCF lost)
- Hazen Argue – farmer – CCF – Wood Mountain, Saskatchewan – MP 1945 Assiniboia 1949, 1953, 1957, 1958 (Switched to the Liberals in 1961 after he lost the NDP leadership race, re-elected as a Liberal in 1962 but defeated by the Progressive Conservatives in 1963 and 1965)
- also William Irvine, a former Progressive and United Farmers of Alberta MP (1917–1935) and founding member of the CCF who was defeated in 1935 returns to Parliament, this time as a British Columbia MP, marking the first time he is elected as a CCFer – editor – CCF – Cariboo – MP 1945–1949 (ran, CCF lost)

=== 1948 by-elections ===
Three CCFers were elected for the first time in by-elections in 1948, for a total of 32 MPs:

- Rodney Young – student – CCF – Vancouver Centre, BC – MP 1948 (ran 1949, CCF lost)
- Owen Lewis Jones – merchant – CCF – Yale, BC – MP 1948, 1949, Okanagan Boundary 1953 (ran 1957, CCF lost)
- Arthur Henry Williams – trade union organizer – CCF – Ontario, Ontario – MP 1948 (ran 1949, CCF lost)

=== 1949 general election ===
The party was reduced to 13 seats in the 1949 election, gaining no new MPs.

=== 1953 general election ===
The party won 23 seats in the 1953 election. Three members had previously been elected but were not incumbents. Thirteen were re-elected. Seven new members:

- Erhart Regier – teacher – CCF/NDP – Burnaby-Coquitlam – MP 1953, 1957, 1958, 1962 (gives up seat after 1962 g.e. for Tommy Douglas, which he won in a by-election)
- Thomas Speakman Barnett – millworker – CCF/NDP – Comox-Alberni – MP 1953, 1957, (ran 1958, CCF lost) returned as NDP 1962, 1963, 1965, (ran 1968, NDP lost, result voided) returned in by-election 1969, 1972 (retired 1974, NDP lost)
- Colin Cameron – pipe fitter/political economist/former MLA – CCF – Nanaimo, BC – MP 1953, (ran 1957, CCF lost) returned in Nanaimo-Cowichan-the Islands – MP 1962, 1963, 1965, 1968 (died 1969, riding assoc. offers seat to Tommy Douglas who wins by-election)
- Harold Edward Winch – electrician/former BC CCF leader – CCF – Vancouver East, BC – MP 1953, 1957, 1958, 1962, 1963, 1965, 1968, (retired 1972, NDP won [C. Paddy Neale])
- Hugh Alexander Bryson – farmer – CCF – Humboldt-Melfort, Saskatchewan – MP 1953, 1957 (ran 1958, CCF lost)
- Merv Johnson – farmer – CCF – Kindersley, Saskatchewan – MP 1953, 1957 (ran 1958, CCF lost)
- Alfred Claude Ellis – teacher – CCF – Regina City, Saskatchewan – MP 1953, 1957 (ran 1958, CCF lost)

=== 1954 by-election ===
One CCFer (William Scottie Bryce in Selkirk, Manitoba), who had previously been elected, won a by-election in 1954 to give the party a total of 24 MPs.

=== 1957 general election ===
The party won 25 seats in the 1957 election, including seven new members

- Frank Howard – logger/union official/former MLA – CCF/NDP – Skeena, BC – MP 1957, 1958, 1962, 1963, 1965, 1968, 1972 (ran 1974, NDP lost, subsequently a BC NDP MLA 1979–1986)
- Alex MacDonald – barrister & solicitor – CCF – Vancouver-Kingsway, BC – MP 1957 (ran 1958, CCF lost)
- Jake Schulz – farmer – CCF – Springfield, Manitoba – MP 1957 (ran 1958, CCF lost)
- Doug Fisher – teacher – CCF/NDP – Port Arthur, Ontario – MP 1957, 1958 NDP 1962, 1963 (retired 1965, NDP lost)
- Arnold Peters – representative – CCF/NDP – Timiskaming, Ontario – MP 1957, 1958 NDP 1962, 1963, 1965, 1968, 1972, 1974, 1979 (ran 1980, NDP lost)
- Murdo Martin – fire fighter – CCF/NDP – Timmins, Ontario – MP 1957, 1958, NDP 1962, 1963, 1965 (ran 1968, NDP lost)
- Louis Lewry – reporter – CCF – Moose Jaw-Lake Centre, Saskatchewan – MP 1957 (ran 1958, CCF lost)

=== 1958 general election ===
The party was reduced to 8 seats in the 1958 election. No new MPs were elected.

=== 1960 general election ===
One CCFer, running as a candidate of the New Party, won a by-election in 1960, giving the party a total of nine MPs.

- Walter Pitman – teacher, later MPP; New Party; Peterborough, Ont.; MP 1960 (ran 1962, NDP lost)

=== 1962 general election ===
Now called the "New Democratic Party", the party won a total of 19 seats in the 1962 election, including nine members elected for the first time:

- Bob Prittie – teacher – NDP – Burnaby Richmond – MP 1962, 1963, 1965, (ran 1968, NDP lost)
- Barry Mather – newspaperman – NDP – New Westminster – MP 1962, 1963, 1965, Surrey 1968, Surrey-White Rock 1972 (retired 1974, NDP lost)
- Arnold Alexander Webster – high school principal/former MLA – NDP – Vancouver Kingsway – MP 1962, 1963 (retired 1965, NDP won Grace MacInnis )
- Thomas Rodney Berger – lawyer – NDP – Vancouver Burrard – MP 1962 (ran 1965, NDP lost)
- David Orlikow – labour educator – NDP – Winnipeg North – MP 1962, 1963, 1965, 1968, 1972, 1974, 1979, 1980, 1984 (ran 1988, NDP lost)
- Malcolm MacInnis – adult educator – NDP – Cape Breton South, N.S. – MP 1962 (ran 1963, NDP lost)
- Reid Scott – lawyer/former MPP – NDP – Danforth – MP 1962, 1963, 1965, 1968 (retired 1972, riding merged, NDP incumbents won re-election in both Broadview and Greenwood ridings)
- Andrew Brewin – lawyer – NDP – Greenwood, Ontario – MP 1962, 1963, 1965, 1972, 1974 (retired 1979, riding merged, NDP won Bob Rae – Broadview-Greenwood)
- David Lewis – barrister – NDP – York South, Ontario. – MP 1962 (ran 1963, NDP lost) returned 1965, 1968, 1972 (ran 1974, NDP lost)

=== 1963 general election ===
The party won a total of 17 seats in the 1963 election, including one member elected for the first time:

- William Dean Howe – physician – NDP – Hamilton South, Ont – MP 1963, 1965, (ran 1968, NDP lost)

=== 1964 by-election ===
One New Democrat was elected in a by-election in 1964, giving the party a total of 18 MPs:

- Max Saltsman – business manager – NDP – Waterloo South, Ont – MP 1964, 1965, 1968, Waterloo 1972, Waterloo-Cambridge 1974 (retired 1979, NDP lost)

=== 1965 general election ===
The party won a total of 21 seats in the 1965 election, including four members elected for the first time:

- Grace MacInnis – writer – NDP – Vancouver Kingsway – MP 1965, 1968, 1972 (retired 1974, NDP lost)
- Ed Schreyer – instructor – NDP – Springfield, Manitoba – MP 1965, 1968 (resigned 1970 to lead Manitoba NDP, by-election NDP Won)
- John Gilbert – lawyer – NDP – Broadview – MP 1965, 1968, 1972, 1974 (retired 1978 to accept judicial appointment, NDP won Bob Rae Broadview-Greenwood)
- Norman Fawcett – railway conductor – NDP – Nickel Belt – MP 1965 (ran 1968, NDP lost)

=== 1967 by-election ===
One New Democrat was elected in a by-election in 1967, giving the party a total of 22 MPs:

- Bud Germa – armature winder – NDP – Sudbury – MP 1967 (ran 1968, NDP lost, subsequently Ontario NDP MPP 1971–1981 for Sudbury)

=== 1968 general election ===
The party won a total of 22 seats in the 1968 election, including nine members elected for the first time:

- Mark Rose – professor of education – NDP – Fraser Valley West – MP 1968–1972–1974, Mission-Port Moody 1979–1980–1983 by (ran provincially, NDP lost by-election)
- Randolph Harding – teacher/former MLA – NDP – Kootenay West – MP 1968, 1972 (ran 1974, NDP lost)
- Ed Broadbent – leader 1975–1989 – NDP – Oshawa Whitby – MP 1968, 1972, 1974, Oshawa 1979, 1980, 1984, 1988 (retired 1990, NDP Won), Ottawa Centre 2004 (retired, NDP won Paul Dewar)
- Rod Thomson – farmer – NDP – Battleford-Kindersley – MP 1968 (ran 1972, NDP lost)
- John Skoberg – fire fighter engineman – NDP – Moose Jaw – MP 1968 (ran 1972, NDP lost)
- John Burton – agricultural economist – NDP – Regina East – MP 1968 (ran 1972, NDP lost)
- Les Benjamin – secretary, manager – NDP – Regina Lake Centre – MP 1968, 1972, 1974, 1979, 1980, 1984, 1988 (retired 1993, riding boundary change, NDP won 1/2, lost 1/2 John Solomon – Regina Lumsden)
- Alfred Gleave – farmer – NDP – Saskatoon-Biggar – MP 1968, 1972 (ran 1974, NDP lost)
- Lorne Nystrom – teacher – NDP – Yorkton-Melville – MP 1968, 1972, 1974, 1979, 1980, 1984, 1988, (ran 1993, NDP lost) Qu'Appelle 1997, Regina Qu'Appelle 2000 (ran 2004, NDP lost)

=== 1970 by-election ===
One New Democrat was elected in a by-election in 1970, giving the party a total of 24 MPs:

- Doug Rowland – special assistant – NDP – Selkirk, Manitoba – MP 1970, 1972 (ran 1974, NDP lost)

=== 1971 by-elections ===
Two New Democrats were elected in by-elections in 1971, giving the party a total of 26 MPs:

- Bill Knight – teacher – NDP – Assinibola, Saskatchewan – MP 1971, 1972 (ran 1974, NDP lost)
- Derek Blackburn – teacher – NDP – Brant, Ontario – MP 1971, 1972, 1974, 1979, 1980, 1984, 1988, (retired 1993, NDP lost)

=== 1972 general election ===
The party won a total of 31 seats in the 1972 election, including ten members elected for the first time:

- Nels Nelson – teacher – NDP – Burnaby-Seymour – MP 1972 (ran 1974, NDP lost)
- Harry Olaussen – stationary engineer – NDP – Coast Chilcotin – MP 1972 (ran 1974, NDP lost)
- Stuart Malcolm Leggatt – lawyer – NDP – New Westminster – MP 1972, 1974, (retired 1979 to run provincially, NDP won) Pauline Jewett New Westminster-Coquitlam)
- Paddy Neale – secretary treasurer – NDP – Vancouver East – MP 1972 (ran 1974, NDP lost)
- Wally Firth – pilot – NDP – Northwest Territories – MP 1972, 1974, (retired 1979, NDP lost)
- John Rodriguez – teacher – NDP – Nickel Belt – MP 1972, 1974, 1979 (ran 1980, NDP lost), returned 1984, 1988 (ran 1993, NDP lost)
- Cyril Symes – teacher – NDP – Sault Ste Marie – MP 1972, 1974, 1979 (ran 1980, NDP lost)
- John Paul Harney – college teacher – NDP – Scarborough West – MP 1972 (ran 1974, NDP lost)
- Terry Grier – lecturer – NDP – Toronto Lakeshore – MP 1972 (ran 1974, NDP lost)
- Eli Nesdoly – school principal – NDP – Meadow Lake, Saskatchewan – MP 1972 (ran 1974, NDP lost)

=== 1974 general election ===
The party won a total of 16 seats in the 1974 election, including one member elected for the first time:

- Andy Hogan – Roman Catholic priest & economist – NDP – Cape Breton East Richmond, Nova Scotia – MP 1974, 1979 (ran 1980, NDP lost)

=== 1978 by-elections ===
Two New Democrats were elected in by-elections in 1978, one to replace an NDP MP who retired, giving the party a total of 17 MPs:

- Fonse Faour – lawyer – NDP – Humber-St.George's-St. Barbe, Newfoundland – MP 1978 Humber-Port Au Port-St. Barbe 1979 (ran 1980, NDP lost)
- Bob Rae – law graduate, former Ontario NDP Premier 1990–1995, Ontario NDP Leader 1982–1996, former NDP MPP York South 1982–1996 – NDP – Broadview – MP 1978, Broadview-Greenwood 1979, 1980 (resigned 1982 to become Ontario NDP leader, NDP won Lynn McDonald, Rae served as Ontario Premier 1990–1995, returned to parliament as a Liberal MP 2008 by-election, became Liberal leader 2011)

=== 1979 general election ===
The party won a total of 26 seats in the 1979 election, including thirteen members elected for the first time:

- Svend Robinson – lawyer – NDP – Burnaby – MP 1979, 1980, 1984, Burnaby Kingsway 1988, 1993, Burnaby Douglas 1997, 2000 (resigned 2004, NDP won)
- Ray Skelly – teacher – NDP – Comox-Powell River – MP 1979, 1980, 1984, North Island-Powell River 1988 (ran 1993, NDP lost)
- Ted Miller – teacher – NDP – Nanaimo-Alberni – MP 1979, 1980 (ran 1984, NDP lost)
- Pauline Jewett – university professor, former Liberal MP (Northumberland, ON 1963-1965) – NDP – New Westminster-Coquitlam – MP 1979, 1980, 1984, 1988 (retired 1993, NDP lost)
- Jim Fulton – probation officer – NDP – Skeena – MP 1979, 1980, 1984, 1988 (retired 1993, NDP lost)
- Margaret Mitchell – community development worker – NDP – Vancouver East – MP 1979, 1980, 1984, 1988 (ran 1993, NDP lost)
- Ian Waddell – community lawyer – NDP – Vancouver Kingsway – MP 1979, 1980, 1984, Port Moody-Coquitlam 1988 (ran 1993, NDP lost)
- Rod Murphy – teacher – NDP – Churchill, Manitoba – MP 1979, 1980, 1984, 1988 (ran 1993, NDP lost)
- Terry Sargeant – office manager – NDP – Selkirk-Interlake – MP 1979, 1980 (ran 1984, NDP lost)
- Bill Blaikie – clergyman – NDP – Winnipeg-Birds Hill – MP 1979, 1980, 1984, Winnipeg Transcona 1988, 1993, 1997, 2000, Elmwood-Transcona 2004, 2006 (retired 2008, NDP won)
- Peter Ittinuar – teacher – NDP – Nuntatsiaq, N.W.T. – MP 1979, 1980 (quit NDP in 1982 to become a Liberal on their promise to create a new territory in the Eastern Arctic (later Nunavut); quit Liberals after he lost the Liberal nomination for the 1984 election)
- Simon De Jong – restaurant owner – NDP – Regina East – MP 1979, 1980, 1984, 1988, Regina Qu-Appelle 1993 (retired 1997, NDP won)
- Bob Ogle – priest – NDP – Saskatoon East – MP 1979, 1980 (retired 1984, NDP lost)

=== 1979 by-election ===
One New Democrat was elected in a by-election in 1979, giving the party a total of 27 MPs:

- Stan Hovdebo – educator – NDP – Prince Albert, Saskatchewan – MP 1979–1980–1984–1988, (ridings merged, NDP Won), Saskatoon-Humboldt – MP 1988–1993 (retired, NDP lost)

=== 1980 general election ===
The party won a total of 32 seats in the 1980 election, including ten members elected for the first time:

- Jim Manly – minister – NDP – Cowichan-Malahat-the Islands – MP 1980–1984–1988 (retired, NDP won David Stupich in Nanaimo-Cowichan & Lynn Hunter in Saanich Gulf Islands)
- Nelson Riis – college instructor, geographer – NDP – Kamloops-Shuswap – MP 1980–1984–1988, Kamloops 1988–1993–1997–2000 (ran, NDP lost)
- Sid Parker – train conductor – NDP – Kootenay East-Revelstoke – MP 1980–1984, Kootenay East 1988–1993 (ran, NDP lost)
- Lyle Kristiansen – financial secretary, woodworker – NDP – Kootenay West – MP 1980–1984, (ran, NDP lost) Kootenay West-Revelstoke 1988–1993 (retired, NDP lost)
- Laverne Lewycky – executive assistant, sociology professor – NDP – Dauphin, Manitoba – MP 1980–1984 (ran, NDP lost)
- Cyril Keeper – city councillor – NDP – Winnipeg-St. James – MP 1980–1984 (Switched Ridings, NDP lost), Winnipeg North Centre 1984–1988 (ran, NDP lost)
- Neil Young – business agent – NDP – Beaches – MP 1980–1984–1988–1993 (ran, NDP lost)
- Ian Deans – self-employed consultant, former Ontario NDP MPP 1967–1979 for Wentworth – NDP – Hamilton Mountain – MP 1980–1984–1987 (resigned, NDP won by-election Marion Dewar)
- Vic Althouse – farmer – NDP – Humboldt-Lake Centre – MP 1980–1984–1988, Mackenzie 1988–1993–1997 (retired, Riding Boundaries Change, NDP lost)
- Doug Anguish – management consultant – NDP – the Battlefords-Meadow Lake – MP 1980–1984 (ran, NDP lost)

=== 1981 by-election ===
One New Democrat was elected in a by-election in 1981, giving the party a total of 33 MPs:

- Dan Heap clergyman, labourer, city counsellor – NDP – Spadina – MP 1981, 1984, 1988 (retired 1993, NDP lost)

=== 1982 by-election ===
One New Democrat was elected in a by-election in 1982, retaining the seat vacated by Bob Rae.

- Lynn McDonald – sociologist – NDP – Broadview-Greenwood – MP 1982, 1984 (ran 1988, NDP lost)

=== 1984 general election ===
The party won a total of 30 seats in the 1984 election, including six members elected for the first time:

- Steven W. Langdon – economist – NDP – Essex-Windsor – MP 1984, 1988 (ran 1993, NDP lost)
- John Parry – mayor – NDP – Kenora-Rainy River – MP 1984 (ran 1988, NDP lost)
- Michael Cassidy – journalist, former Ontario NDP leader 1979–1982, former Ontario NDP MPP 1971–1984 Ottawa Centre – NDP – Ottawa Centre – MP 1984 (ran 1988, NDP lost)
- Iain Angus – parks and recreation planner/former MPP – NDP – Thunder Bay-Atikokan – MP 1984, 1988 (ran 1993, NDP lost)
- Ernie Epp – history professor – NDP – Thunder Bay-Nipigon – MP 1984 (ran 1988, NDP lost)
- Howard McCurdy – professor – NDP – Windsor-Walkerville – MP 1984, Windsor-Lake St. Clair 1988 (ran 1993, NDP lost)

=== 1986 floor crossing ===
One Progressive Conservative MP crossed the floor to the NDP in 1986, giving the party a total of 31 MPs:

- Robert Toupin Terrebonne, Quebec – MP 1984 as a PC, crossed floor to NDP 1986, switched to independent 1987, defeated in 1988 g.e.

=== 1987 by-elections ===
Three New Democrats were elected in by-elections in 1987, giving the party a total of 33 MPs:

- Audrey McLaughlin – consultant – NDP – Yukon – MP 1987, 1988, 1993 (retired 1997, NDP won Louise Hardy)
- Marion Dewar – public nurse, former mayor of Ottawa – NDP – Hamilton Mountain – MP 1987 (ran 1988, NDP lost)
- Jack Harris – lawyer, leader Newfoundland NDP (1992–2006) – NDP – St. John's East – MP 1987, (ran 1988, NDP lost) returned 2008, 2011 (ran 2015, NDP lost), returned 2019 (retired 2021, NDP lost)

=== 1988 general election ===
The party won a total of 43 seats in the 1988 election, including nineteen members elected for the first time:

- Ross Harvey – director of research – NDP – Edmonton East – MP 1988 (ran 1993, NDP lost)
- Dave Barrett – social worker, ex-premier, Broadcaster – NDP – Esquimalt-Juan de Fuca – MP 1988 (ran 1993, NDP lost)
- Joy Langan – director – NDP – Mission-Coquitlam – MP 1988 (ran 1993, NDP lost)
- David Stupich – chartered accountant/former MLA – NDP – Nanaimo-Cowichan – MP 1988 (ran 1993, NDP lost)
- Dawn Black – executive assistant – NDP – Burnaby-New Westminster – MP 1988 (ran 1993, NDP lost), New Westminster-Coquitlam MP returned 2006, 2008 (retired in 2009 to run provincially, NDP won Fin Donnelly)
- Robert Skelly – teacher – NDP – Comox-Alberni – MP 1988 (ran 1993, NDP lost)
- Lyle Dean MacWilliam – market research-education – NDP – Okanagan-Shuswap – MP 1988 (ran 1993, NDP lost)
- Jack Whittaker – lawyer – NDP – Okanagan-Similkameen-Merritt – MP 1988 (ran 1993, NDP lost)
- Brian Gardiner – manager – NDP – Prince George-Bulkley Valley – MP 1988 (ran 1993, NDP lost)
- Lynn Hunter – co-ordinator – NDP – Saanich-Gulf Islands – MP 1988 (ran 1993, NDP lost)
- Jim Karpoff – administrator – NDP – Surrey North – MP 1988 (ran 1993, NDP lost)
- John Brewin – lawyer – NDP – Victoria – MP 1988 (ran 1993, NDP lost)
- Steve Butland – principal – NDP – Sault Ste Marie – MP 1988 (ran 1993, NDP lost)
- Cid Samson – Ministry of Labour – NDP – Timmins-Chapleau – MP 1988 (ran 1993, NDP lost)
- Ray Funk – farmer, businessman – NDP – Prince Albert-Churchill River – MP 1988 (ran 1993, NDP lost)
- Rod Laporte – lawyer – NDP – Moose Jaw-Lake Centre – MP 1988 (ran 1993, NDP lost)
- Chris Axworthy – professor – NDP – Saskatoon-Clark's Crossing – MP 1988, 1993, Saskatchewan-Rosetown-Biggar 1997 (resigned 1999 to enter provincial cabinet, NDP won Dennis Gruending, Axworthy later unsuccessfully attempted to re-enter parliament as a Liberal in 2004 & 2006)
- Ron Fisher – hoistman – NDP – Saskatoon-Dundurn – MP 1988 (ran 1993, NDP lost)
- Len Taylor – journalist – NDP – the Battlefords-Meadow Lake – MP 1988, 1993 (ran 1997, NDP lost)

=== 1990 by-election ===
Two New Democrats were elected in by-elections in 1990, one of them replaced Ed Broadbent, who retired, giving the party a total of 44 MPs:

- Michael Breaugh – teacher, former Ontario NDP MPP for Oshawa 1975–1990 – NDP – Oshawa – MP 1990 (ran 1993, NDP lost)
- Phil Edmonston – journalist, writer, consumer advocate – NDP – Chambly, Quebec – MP 1990 (retired 1993, NDP lost)

=== 1993 general election ===
The party won a total of nine seats in the 1993 election, including one member elected for the first time:

- John Solomon – businessman/former MLA – NDP – Regina-Lumsden – MP 1993, 1997 (ran 2000, NDP lost)

=== 1997 general election ===
The party won a total of 21 seats in the 1997 election, including fifteen members elected for the first time:

- Libby Davies – human resources co-ordinator – NDP – Vancouver East – MP 1997, 2000, 2004, 2006, 2008, 2011 (ret. 2015, NDP won)
- Bev Desjarlais – ward clerk (Health Care Worker) – NDP – Churchill – MP 1997, 2000, 2004 (lost nomination, quit NDP 2005, NDP lost)
- Pat Martin – woodworker/union representative – NDP – Winnipeg Centre – MP 1997, 2000, 2004, 2006, 2008, 2011 (ran 2015, NDP lost)
- Judy Wasylycia-Leis – legislator/former MLA – NDP – Winnipeg North Centre – MP 1997, 2000, 2004, 2006, 2008, (retired 2010 to run for Mayor of Winnipeg, NDP lost)
- Yvon Godin – union representative – NDP – Acadie-Bathurst, N.B. – MP 1997, 2000, 2004, 2006, 2008, 2011 (retired 2015, NDP lost)
- Angela Vautour – union representative – NDP – Beausejour-Petitcodiac, N.B. – MP 1997, 1999 (when she quit to join the PC Party, MP till 2000)
- Michelle Dockrill – front line health care worker – NDP – Bras d'Or Cape Breton – MP 1997 (ran 2000, NDP lost)
- Wendy Lill – playwright/historian/writer – NDP – Dartmouth – MP 1997, 2000 (retired 2004, NDP lost)
- Alexa McDonough – social worker, former federal NDP leader 1995–2003, former Nova Scotia NDP leader 1982–1994, former Nova Scotia NDP MLA – NDP – Halifax – MP 1997, 2000, 2004, 2006, (retired 2008 NDP won Megan Leslie)
- Gordon Earle – retired senior public servant – NDP – Halifax West – MP 1997, 2000 (ran 2004, NDP lost)
- Peter Stoffer – customer service lead agent – NDP – Sackville-Eastern Shore – MP 1997, 2000, 2004, 2006, 2008, 2011 (ran 2015, NDP lost)
- Peter Mancini – lawyer – NDP – Sydney-Victoria – MP 1997, 2000 (ran 2004, NDP lost)
- Rick Laliberte – school trustee – NDP – Churchill River – MP 1997, 1999 (Switched to Liberals in 1999, then an Independent MP till 2004)
- Dick Proctor – communications consultant – NDP – Pallister – MP 1997, 2000, 2004 (ran 2006, NDP lost)
- Louise Hardy – social worker – NDP – Yukon – MP 1997 (ran 2000, NDP lost)

=== 1999 by-election ===
- Dennis Gruending – journalist – NDP – Saskatoon-Rosetown-Biggar – MP 1999, 2000 (ran 2004, NDP lost)

=== 2000 general election ===
The party won a total of 13 seats in the 2000 election, including one member elected for the first time:

- Joe Comartin – managing director – NDP – Windsor-St. Clair – MP 2000, 2004, 2006, 2008, 2011 (retired 2015, NDP lost)

=== 2002 by-election ===
One New Democrat was elected in a by-election in 2002, giving the party a total of 14 MPs:

- Brian Masse – city councillor – NDP – Windsor West – MP 2002, 2004, 2006, 2008, 2011, 2015, 2019, 2021 (ran 2025, NDP lost)

=== 2004 general election ===
The party won a total of 19 seats in the 2004 election, including eight members elected for the first time:

- Bill Siksay – parliamentary assistant – NDP – Burnaby-Douglas, BC – MP 2004, 2006, 2008 (retired 2011, NDP won Kennedy Stewart)
- Peter Julian – financial administrator – NDP – Burnaby-New Westminster, BC – MP 2004, 2006, 2008, 2011, (riding renamed New Westminster—Burnaby) 2015, 2019, 2021 (ran 2025, NDP lost)
- Jean Crowder – municipal councillor – NDP – Nanaimo-Cowichan, BC – MP 2004, 2006, 2008, 2011 (retired 2015, riding dissolved)
- Nathan Cullen – consultant – NDP – Skeena-Bulkley Valley, BC – MP 2004, 2006, 2008, 2011, 2015 (retired 2019 and entered provincial politics, NDP won)
- Dave Christopherson – executive director, former Ontario NDP MPP – NDP – Hamilton Centre – MP 2004, 2006, 2008, 2011, 2015 (retired 2019, NDP won)
- Tony Martin – community development, Assistant Minister – NDP – Sault Ste Marie – MP 2004, 2006, 2008 (ran 2011, NDP lost)
- Charlie Angus – writer/musician/activist/environmentalist – NDP – Timmins-James Bay – MP 2004, 2006, 2008, 2011, 2015, 2019, 2021 (retired 2025, NDP lost)
- Jack Layton – city councillor/professor – NDP – Toronto Danforth – MP 2004, 2006, 2008, 2011 (died in office 2011, NDP won byelection)

=== 2006 general election ===
The party won a total of 29 seats in the 2004 election, including eleven members elected for the first time:

- Alex Atamanenko – retired teacher – NDP – BC Southern Interior, BC – MP 2006, 2008, 2011 (retired 2015, riding abolished)
- Penny Priddy – BC MLA – NDP – Surrey North, BC – MP 2006, 2008 (retired 2011, NDP lost)
- Catherine J. Bell – labour leader – NDP – Vancouver Island North, BC – MP 2006 (ran 2008, NDP lost)
- Denise Savoie – Victoria City Councillor – NDP – Victoria, BC – MP 2006, 2008, 2011 (resigned 2012, NDP won byelection)
- Dennis Bevington – former mayor Fort Smith – NDP – Western Arctic, NWT – MP 2006, 2008, 2011 (ran 2015, NDP lost)
- Peggy Nash – CAW negotiator – NDP – Parkdale-High Park, ONT – MP 2006 (ran 2008, NDP lost) returned 2011 (ran 2015, NDP lost)
- Olivia Chow – city councillor – NDP – Trinity-Spadina, ONT – MP 2006, 2008, 2011 (resigned 2014 to run for Mayor of Toronto, NDP lost byelection)
- Wayne Marston – trade unionist – NDP – Hamilton East-Stoney Creek, ONT – MP 2006, 2008, 2011 (ran 2015, NDP lost)
- Chris Charlton – director of government and community relations – NDP – Hamilton Mountain, ONT – MP 2006, 2008, 2011 (retired 2015, NDP won)
- Paul Dewar – teacher – NDP – Ottawa Centre, ONT – MP 2006, 2008, 2011 (ran 2015, NDP lost)
- Irene Mathyssen – teacher, former MPP – NDP – London-Fanshawe – MP 2006, 2008, 2011, 2015 (retired 2019, NDP won)

=== 2007 byelection ===
- Thomas Mulcair – former provincial cabinet minister – NDP – Outremont – MP 2007, 2008, 2011, 2015 (resigned 2018, NDP lost byelection)

=== 2008 general election ===
The party won a total of 37 seats in the 2008 federal election, including 11 members elected for the first time, additionally Jack Harris returned after having served 1987–1988:

- Malcolm Allen – trade union official and local councillor – NDP – Welland, ON – MP 2008, 2011 (ran 2015, NDP lost)
- Niki Ashton – university instructor – NDP – Churchill, MB – MP 2008, 2011, 2015, 2019, 2021 (ran 2025, NDP lost)
- Don Davies - lawyer - NDP - Vancouver Kingsway, BC, 2008, 2011, 2015, 2019, 2021, 2025
- Linda Duncan – environmental lawyer – NDP – Edmonton—Strathcona, AB, MP 2008, 2011, 2015 (retired 2019, NDP won)
- Claude Gravelle – machinist, union organizer – NDP – Nickel Belt, ON, MP 2008, 2011 (ran 2015, NDP lost)
- Carol Hughes – union staffer – NDP – Algoma—Manitoulin—Kapuskasing, ON, MP 2008, 2011, 2015, 2019, 2021 (retired 2025, NDP lost)
- Bruce Hyer – eco-entrepreneur – NDP – Thunder Bay—Superior North, ON, MP 2008, 2011 (quit NDP 2011 to sit as Ind., joined Greens in 2013, defeated 2015)
- Megan Leslie – law professor – NDP – Halifax, NS, MP 2008, 2011 (retired 2015, NDP lost)
- Jim Maloway – provincial legislator – NDP – Elmwood—Transcona, MB MP 2008 (ran 2011, NDP lost)
- John Raffety – broadcaster – NDP – Thunder Bay—Rainy River, ON MP 2008, 2011 (ran 2015, NDP lost)
- Glenn Thibeault – executive director – NDP – Sudbury, ON MP 2008, 2011 (resigned 2014 to run for the Ontario Liberal Party, NDP won byelection)

=== 2011 general election ===
The party won a total of 103 seats in the 2011 federal election, forming Official Opposition for the first time. 68 members were elected for the first time:

- Robert Aubin – musician, teacher, NDP – Trois-Rivières, QC – MP 2011, 2015 (ran 2019, NDP lost)
- Paulina Ayala – teacher, NDP – Honoré-Mercier, QC – MP 2011 (ran 2015, NDP lost)
- Tyrone Benskin – actor, artistic director, composer, writer, NDP – Jeanne-Le Ber, QC – MP 2011 (retired 2015, riding dissolved)
- Denis Blanchette – computer analyst and public servant, NDP – Louis-Hébert, QC – MP 2011 (ran 2015, NDP lost)
- Lysane Blanchette-Lamothe – teacher, NDP – Pierrefonds—Dollard, QC – MP 2011 (ran 2015, NDP lost)
- Françoise Boivin – lawyer, NDP – Gatineau, QC – MP 2011 (ran 2015, NDP lost)
- Charmaine Borg – community activist, labour relations officer, NDP – Terrebonne-Blainville, QC – MP 2011 (ran 2015, NDP lost)
- Alexandre Boulerice – community activist, journalist, union communications adviser, NDP – Rosemont—La Petite-Patrie, QC – MP 2011, 2015, 2019, 2021, 2025
- Marjolaine Boutin-Sweet – teacher, trade unionist, NDP – Hochelaga, QC – MP 2011, 2015 (retired 2019, NDP lost)
- Tarik Brahmi – engineer, NDP – Saint-Jean, QC – MP 2011 (retired 2015, NDP lost)
- Ruth Ellen Brosseau – assistant manager, NDP – Berthier—Maskinongé, QC – MP 2011, 2015 (ran 2019, NDP lost)
- Guy Caron – economist, journalist, researcher, NDP – Rimouski-Neigette—Témiscouata—Les Basques, QC – MP 2011, 2015 (ran 2019, NDP lost)
- Andrew Cash – musician, NDP – Davenport, ON – MP 2011 (ran 2015, NDP lost)
- Sylvain Chicoine – security officer, trade unionist, NDP – Châteauguay—Saint-Constant, QC – MP 2011 (ran 2015, NDP lost))
- Robert Chisholm – former NS NDP MLA for Halifax Atlantic (1991–2003), former provincial leader NS NDP (1996–2000), trade union official, NDP – Dartmouth—Cole Harbour, NS – MP 2011 (ran 2015, NDP lost)
- François Choquette – teacher, NDP – Drummond, QC – MP 2011, 2015 (ran 2019, NDP lost)
- Ryan Cleary – journalist, NDP – St. John's South—Mount Pearl, NL – MP 2011 (ran 2015, NDP lost)
- Raymond Côté – public servant, NDP – Beauport—Limoilou, QC – MP 2011 (ran 2015, NDP lost)
- Anne-Marie Day – employment agency director, NDP – Charlesbourg—Haute-Saint-Charles, QC – MP 2011 (ran 2015, NDP lost)
- Pierre Dionne Labelle – development agent, NDP – Rivière-du-Nord, QC – MP 2011 (ran 2015, NDP lost)
- Rosane Doré Lefebvre – environmentalist, NDP – Alfred-Pellan, QC – MP 2011 (ran 2015, NDP lost)
- Matthew Dubé – coach, NDP – Chambly—Borduas, QC – MP 2011, 2015 (ran 2019, NDP lost)
- Pierre-Luc Dusseault – student, NDP – Sherbrooke, QC – MP 2011, 2015 (ran 2019, NDP lost)
- Mylène Freeman – research assistant, student, NDP – Argenteuil—Papineau—Mirabel, QC – MP 2011 (ran 2015, NDP lost)
- Randall Garrison – criminologist, college instructor, NDP – Esquimalt—Juan de Fuca, BC – MP 2011, 2015, 2019, 2021 (retired 2024, NDP lost)
- Réjean Genest – horticulturalist, NDP – Shefford, QC – MP 2011 (retired 2015, NDP lost)
- Jonathan Genest-Jourdain – lawyer, NDP – Manicouagan, QC – MP 2011 (ran 2015, NDP lost)
- Alain Giguère – lawyer, NDP – Marc-Aurèle-Fortin, QC – MP 2011 (ran 2015, NDP lost)
- Sadia Groguhé – counsellor, NDP – Saint-Lambert, QC – MP 2011 (ran 2015, NDP lost)
- Dan Harris – IT technician, NDP – Scarborough Southwest, ON – MP 2011 (ran 2015, NDP lost)
- Sana Hassainia – editor, printer, NDP – Verchères—Les Patriotes, QC – MP 2011 (quit NDP in 2014, retired 2015, NDP lost)
- Pierre Jacob – criminologist, educator, NDP – Brome—Missisquoi, QC – MP 2011 (retired 2015, NDP lost)
- Matthew Kellway – economist, policy analyst, NDP – Beaches—East York, ON – MP 2011 (ran 2015, NDP lost)
- François Lapointe – composer, musician, project co-ordinator, NDP – Montmagny—L'Islet—Kamouraska—Rivière-du-Loup, QC – MP 2011 (ran 2015, NDP lost)
- Jean-François Larose – correctional officer, security guard, NDP – Repentigny, QC – MP 2011 (quit NDP in 2014 to join Forces et Démocratie, lost in 2015)
- Alexandrine Latendresse – actor, teacher, NDP – Louis-Saint-Laurent, QC – MP 2011 (retired 2015, NDP lost)
- Hélène Laverdière – diplomat, NDP – Laurier—Sainte-Marie, QC – MP 2011, 2015 (retired 2019, NDP lost)
- Hélène LeBlanc – agronomist, program manager, NDP – LaSalle—Émard, QC – MP 2011 (ran 2015, NDP lost)
- Laurin Liu – student, journalist, NDP – Rivière-des-Mille-Îles, QC – MP 2011 (ran 2015, NDP lost)
- Hoang Mai – international lawyer, notary, NDP – Brossard—La Prairie, QC – MP 2011 (ran 2015, NDP lost)
- Élaine Michaud – communications officer, NDP – Portneuf—Jacques-Cartier, QC – MP 2011 (ran 2015, NDP lost)
- Christine Moore – nurse, NDP – Abitibi—Témiscamingue, QC – MP 2011, 2015 (retired 2019, NDP lost)
- Dany Morin – chiropractor, NDP – Chicoutimi—Le Fjord, QC – MP 2011 (ran 2015, NDP lost)
- Isabelle Morin – teacher, NDP – Notre-Dame-de-Grâce—Lachine, QC – MP 2011 (ran 2015, NDP lost)
- Marc-André Morin – environmentalist, journalist, NDP – Laurentides—Labelle, QC – MP 2011 (lost 2015 NDP nomination, NDP lost)
- Marie-Claude Morin – actor, student, – Saint-Hyacinthe—Bagot, QC – MP 2011 (retired 2015, NDP lost)
- Pierre Nantel – artistic director, television commentator, NDP – Longueuil—Pierre-Boucher, QC – MP 2011, 2015 (left NDP in 2019 and ran as a Green, defeated, NDP lost)
- Jamie Nicholls – landscape architect, NDP – Vaudreuil-Soulanges, QC – MP 2011 (ran 2015, NDP lost)
- José Nunez-Melo – hotelier, civil servant, NDP – Laval, QC – MP 2011 (left NDP and ran as a Green in 2015 and defeated)
- Annick Papillon – public servant, NDP – Québec, QC – MP 2011 (ran 2015, NDP lost)
- Claude Patry – union leader, NDP – Jonquière—Alma, QC – MP 2011 (joined BQ in 2013, defeated in 2015)
- Ève Péclet – community activist, law school graduate, NDP – La Pointe-de-l'Île, QC – MP 2011 (ran 2015, NDP lost)
- Manon Perreault – administrator, NDP – Montcalm, QC – MP 2011 (ran 2015, NDP lost)
- François Pilon – architectural designer, public servant, union leader, NDP – Laval—Les Îles, QC – MP 2011 (ran 2015, NDP lost)
- Anne Minh-Thu Quach – teacher, NDP – Beauharnois—Salaberry, QC – MP 2011, 2015 (Salaberry—Suroît) (retired 2019, NDP lost)
- Mathieu Ravignat policy researcher, NDP – Pontiac, QC – MP 2011 (ran 2015, NDP lost)
- Francine Raynault – real estate agent, NDP – Joliette, QC – MP 2011 (retired 2015, NDP lost)
- Roméo Saganash – director of government relations for the Grand Council of the Crees, NDP – Abitibi—Baie-James—Nunavik—Eeyou, QC – MP 2011, 2015 (retired 2019, NDP lost)
- Lise St-Denis – teacher, NDP – Saint-Maurice—Champlain, QC – MP 2011 (retired 2015, NDP lost)
- Jasbir Sandhu – building contractor, restaurant owner, taxi driver, truck driver, NDP – Surrey North, BC – MP 2011 (ran 2015, NDP lost)
- Djaouida Sellah – physician, NDP – Saint-Bruno—Saint-Hubert, QC – MP 2011 (ran 2015, NDP lost)
- Jinny Sims – guidance counsellor, teacher, NDP – Newton—North Delta, BC – MP 2011 (ran 2015, NDP lost)
- Rathika Sitsabaiesan – community worker, NDP – Scarborough—Rouge River, ON – MP 2011 (ran 2015, NDP lost)
- Kennedy Stewart – professor, NDP – Burnaby—Douglas, BC – MP 2011, 2015 (resigned in 2018 to run for Mayor of Vancouver, NDP won by-election Jagmeet Singh)
- Mike Sullivan – union representative, NDP – York South—Weston, ON – MP 2011 (ran 2015, NDP lost)
- Philip Toone – network administrator, notary, teacher, NDP – Gaspésie—Îles-de-la-Madeleine, QC – MP 2011 (ran 2015, NDP lost)
- Jonathan Tremblay – brickmason, NDP – Montmorency—Charlevoix—Haute-Côte-Nord, QC – MP 2011 (ran 2015, NDP lost)
- Nycole Turmel – municipal administrator, former president of the Public Service Alliance of Canada, NDP – Hull—Aylmer, QC – MP 2011 (appointed NDP interim leader July 2011, ran 2015, NDP lost)

=== 2012 by-election ===
A by-election was called to replace former NDP leader Jack Layton, who died of cancer in August 2011.

- Craig Scott - lawyer and academic, NDP - Toronto-Danforth, ON - MP 2012 (ran 2015, NDP lost)

=== 2015 general election ===
The party won a total of 44 seats in the 2015 federal election. 16 members were elected for the first time:

- Sheri Benson — Saskatoon West, SK, MP 2015 (ran 2019, NDP lost)
- Daniel Blaikie — Elmwood—Transcona, MB, MP 2015, 2019, 2021 (retired 2024, NDP won byelection)
- Rachel Blaney — North Island—Powell River, BC, MP 2015, 2019, 2021
- Richard Cannings — South Okanagan—West Kootenay, BC, MP 2015, 2019, 2021
- Scott Duvall — Hamilton Mountain, ON, MP 2015, 2019 (retired 2021, NDP lost)
- Cheryl Hardcastle — Windsor—Tecumseh, ON, MP 2015 (ran 2019, 2021, NDP lost)
- Gord Johns — Courtenay—Alberni, BC, MP 2015, 2019, 2021, 2025
- Georgina Jolibois — Desnethé—Missinippi—Churchill River, MB, MP 2015 (ran 2019, NDP lost)
- Jenny Kwan — Vancouver East, BC, MP 2015, 2019, 2021, 2025
- Alistair MacGregor — Cowichan—Malahat—Langford, BC, MP 2015, 2019, 2021 (ran 2025, NDP lost)
- Sheila Malcolmson — Nanaimo—Ladysmith, BC, MP 2015 (resigned January 2, 2019 to enter provincial politics, Greens won by-election)
- Tracey Ramsey — Essex, ON, MP 2015 (ran 2019, 2021, NDP lost)
- Brigitte Sansoucy — Saint-Hyacinthe—Bagot, QC, MP 2015 (ran 2019, NDP lost)
- Wayne Stetski — Kootenay—Columbia, BC, MP 2015 (ran 2019, 2021, NDP lost)
- Karine Trudel — Jonquière, QC, MP 2015 (ran 2019, NDP lost)
- Erin Weir — Regina—Lewvan, SK, MP 2015 (expelled from NDP 2018, did not run 2019, NDP lost)

=== 2019 by-election ===
A by-election was called in Burnaby-South to replace Kennedy Stewart, who was elected mayor of Vancouver in 2018.

- Jagmeet Singh - Federal NDP leader, lawyer, and human rights advocate, NDP Burnaby-South, BC - MP by2019, 2019, 2021 (ran 2025, lost)

=== 2019 general election ===
Under the leadership of Jagmeet Singh, the party won 24 seats in the 2019 federal election. 7 members were elected for the first time:

- Taylor Bachrach — Skeena—Bulkley Valley, MP 2019, 2021 (ran 2025, lost)
- Laurel Collins — Victoria, MP 2019, 2021 (ran 2025, lost)
- Leah Gazan — Winnipeg Centre, MP 2019, 2021, 2025
- Matthew Green — Hamilton Centre, MP 2019, 2021 (ran 2025, lost)
- Lindsay Mathyssen — London—Fanshawe, MP 2019, 2021 (ran 2025, lost)
- Heather McPherson — Edmonton Strathcona, MP 2019, 2021, 2025
- Mumilaaq Qaqqaq — Nunavut, MP 2019 (retired 2021, NDP won)

=== 2021 general election ===
The NDP won 25 seats in the 2021 federal election. Four members were elected for the first time:

- Lisa Marie Barron — Nanaimo—Ladysmith, MP 2021 (ran 2025, lost)
- Blake Desjarlais — Edmonton Griesbach, MP 2021 (ran 2025, lost)
- Lori Idlout — Nunavut, MP 2021, 2025
- Bonita Zarrillo — Port Moody—Coquitlam, MP 2021 (ran 2025, lost)

=== 2024 by-election ===
A by-election was called in Elmwood—Transcona to replace Daniel Blaikie.

- Leila Dance — Elmwood—Transcona, MP by2024, (lost 2025)

=== 2025 general election ===
The NDP won 7 seats in the 2025 federal election. All were incumbents

== Prominent CCF/NDP members and organizers ==
- Gerald Caplan – former NDP secretary, NDP researcher, NDP historian
- Thérèse Casgrain – women's rights activist, leader of the Quebec wing of the CCF
- Michel Chartrand – union leader, leader of the Quebec wing of the CCF
- Judy Darcy – union leader
- Shirley Douglas – health care advocate, daughter of Tommy Douglas
- Pierre Ducasse – Jack Layton's first Quebec lieutenant
- Ed Finn – leader of the Newfoundland Democratic Party and first leader of the Newfoundland New Democratic Party, federal candidate.
- Eugene Forsey – CCF researcher, organizer and candidate
- Adam Giambrone – Party president 2000–2006
- Herschel Hardin – former Leadership Candidate (in 1995)
- Jamey Heath – former NDP communications director under Layton
- James Laxer – former NDP research director under Ed Broadbent, former co-leader of the Waffle faction
- Robert Laxer – leading figure in the Waffle
- Donald C. MacDonald – national organizer in the 1940s and 1950s until becoming leader of the Ontario CCF
- Bev Meslo – former Leadership Candidate (2003)
- Desmond Morton – historian (many subjects, including NDP historian)
- Frank Scott – CCF chairman (1942–1950) and League for Social Reconstruction co-founder
- Lloyd R. Shaw – first director of research for the CCF, funder
- Lewis Stubbs – founding member, ran in 1933 by-election as the CCF's first ever candidate
- Frank Underhill – CCF co-founder
- Mel Watkins – economist, former co-leader of the Waffle

== Prominent NDP candidates and past candidates ==
2006 election

- Marilyn Churley – former Ontario cabinet minister and member of the provincial legislature.
- Léo-Paul Lauzon – fr:Léo-Paul Lauzon Author, Quebec celebrity
- Ed Schreyer – former Governor General of Canada, former Manitoba NDP Premier
- Paul Summerville – economist
- Rob Moir – economist, environmentalist in Fundy Royal

2004, 2006 elections

- Charlie Angus – writer/musician/activist/environmentalist
- Paul Ferreira – public relations/activist, later, an Ontario MPP
- Peg Norman – documentary filmmaker (My Left Breast)

2004 election

- Malcolm Azania – journalist, from CBC reality show Political Animal
- Monia Mazigh – wife of Maher Arar, unjustly deported from Canada and tortured by Syrian government
- Des McGrath – Catholic priest, co-founder of fisherman's union

2002 by-election

- Bill Phipps – former moderator of the United Church of Canada

2000 by-election

- Greg Malone – comedian, from 1980s CBC comedy show CODCO, gay activist

2000 election

- Michael Valpy – columnist

1997 election

- Lombe Chinkangala – former opposition leader in Zambia (Leader of the Zambian Democratic Party)
- Pedram Moallemian – prominent Iranian blogger

1988, 1993 elections

- Dave Barrett – former BC NDP premier

1988 election

- Anton Kuerti – classical pianist
- Leonard V. Johnson – retired Major-General
- Howard Pawley – former Manitoba NDP Premier
- Judy Darcy – future CUPE national president

1979, 1980 elections

- James Lockyer – later a prominent Canadian lawyer

1979 election

- Georges Erasmus – future leader of the Assembly of First Nations

1972 election

- Bill Lishman – film Fly Away Home based upon his efforts to train Geese and Swans how to migrate

1968, 2000, 2004, 2006 elections

- Bruce Rogers (broadcaster) – former host of CBC Radio Toronto Metro Morning

1968 election

- Laurier Lapierre – former co-host of This Hour Has Seven Days, future Liberal senator

1962, 1963, 1965 and 1968 elections

- Charles Taylor – internationally renowned philosopher

1953 federal election

- Donald C. MacDonald – future Ontario CCF/NDP leader

1950 Cartier by-election

- Kalmen Kaplansky – human rights activist

== See also ==
- List of British Columbia CCF/NDP members
- List of Alberta CCF/NDP members
- List of Saskatchewan CCF/NDP members
- List of Manitoba CCF/NDP members
- List of Ontario CCF/NDP members
- List of Nova Scotia CCF/NDP members
- List of Yukon NDP members
