= List of Progressive/United Farmer MPs =

List of Members of the House of Commons of Canada who sat as members of the Progressive Party of Canada or represented the United Farmers of Ontario (UFO) or United Farmers of Alberta (UFA) or the United Farmers elsewhere. The list does not include Liberal-Progressives, as these MPs sat with the Liberal caucus. In the 1930s, most remaining Progressive/United Farmers MPs joined the Co-operative Commonwealth Federation.

See also List of Labour MPs (Canada), List of articles about CCF/NDP members

Listed by Parliament of first election

== 13th Parliament (1917-1921) ==
0+5

- Thomas Wakem Caldwell, United Farmers, Victoria—Carleton, New Brunswick, 1919 (by-election)-1921 (as Progressive) (def. 1925 as Independent Liberal-Progressive
- Oliver Robert Gould, United Farmers, Assiniboia, SK, 1919 (by-election)-1921 (switched to Progressive) (def. 1925)
- John Wilfred Kennedy, UFO-Labour, Glengarry and Stormont, Ontario, 1919 (by-election)-1921 (switched to Progressive) (def. 1925)
- Sydney Smith McDermand, UFO, Elgin East, ON, 1920 (by-election) (ran as Progressive 1921, def.)
- Robert Gardiner, Progressive, Medicine Hat, AB, 1921 (by-election)-1921 (general election)-1925-1926(switched to UFA)-1930 (Member of Ginger Group from 1924, ran as CCF in 1935, def.)

== 14th Parliament (1921-1925) ==
4+58 (incl 1 Independent Progressive, 2 UFA and 1 UFO)

- Leland Payson Bancroft, Progressive, Selkirk, MB, 1921 (def. 1925 as Liberal-Progressive, elected as LP 1926)
- Joseph Binette, Progressive, Prescott, ON, 1921 (joined Liberals 1922)
- Thomas William Bird, Progressive, Nelson, MB, 1921-1925-1926 (def. 1930)
- William Black, Progressive, Huron South, ON, 1921 (retired 1925)
- George Arthur Brethen, Progressive, Peterborough East, ON, 1921 (def. 1925)
- John Livingston Brown, Progressive, Lisgar, MB, 1921-1925 (reelected 1926-1930 as Liberal Progressive)
- Milton Neil Campbell, Progressive, Mackenzie, SK, 1921-1925-1926-1930 (ret? 1933)
- Archibald M. Carmichael, Progressive, Kindersley, SK, 1921-1925-1926-1930 (ret 1935)
- George Gibson Coote, Progressive, Macleod, AB, 1921-1925-1926(as UFA)-1930 (def. 1935 as CCF). (Ginger Group member)
- Thomas Alexander Crerar, Progressive (Leader 1920-1922), Marquette, MB, 1921 (ret. 1925, ran as Lib 1930by; Prev Liberal Unionist, 1917, crossed floor 1919)
- Claudius Charles Davies, Progressive, North Battleford, SK, 1921 (def. 1925)
- John Douglas Fraser Drummond, Progressive, Middlesex West, ON, 1921 (died 1925)
- Preston Elliott, Progressive, Dundas, ON, 1921 (ran as Liberal 1935, def.)
- William Elliott, Progressive, Waterloo South, ON, 1921 (def. 1925)
- John Evans, Progressive, Saskatoon, SK 1921, Rosetown, SK, 1925-1926 (def 1930, def as CCF 1935)
- Burt Wendell Fansher, Progressive, Lambton East, ON, 1921 (def. 1925) 1926 (def. 1930) (Ran and def. as Reconstruction Party candidate 1935)
- John Walter Findlay, Progressive, Bruce South, ON, 1921 (def. 1925)
- Robert Forke, Progressive (Leader 1922-1926), Brandon, MB, 1921-1925 (re-elected as Liberal-Progressive 1926, sworn into Cabinet as Minister of Immigration and Colonization)
- Edward Joseph Garland, Progressive, Bow River, AB, 1921-1925-1926(as UFA)-1930 (Ginger Group member, joined CCF, def. as CCF candidate 1935)
- William James Hammell, Progressive, Muskoka, ON, 1921 (joined Liberals 1922)
- Archie Latimer Hodgins, Progressive, Middlesex East, ON, 1921 (def. 1925)
- Robert Alexander Hoey, Progressive, Springfield, MB, 1921 (ret? 1925)
- Levi William Humphrey, Progressive, Kootenay West, BC, 1921 (def. 1925)
- Lincoln Henry Jelliff, Progressive, Lethbridge, AB, 1921-1925-1926(as UFA)
- Robert Milton Johnson, Progressive, Moose Jaw SK, 1921 (election declared void 1923, Hopkins succeeds in by election, Johnson def. 1926), ran for Social Credit 1935
- John Frederick Johnston, Progressive, Last Mountain, SK 1921, Long Lake, SK 1925 (re-elected as Liberal 1926, first elected as Unionist 1917)
- Donald Ferdinand Kellner, Progressive, Edmonton East, AB, 1921 (def 1925) 1926(as UFA) (def. 1930)
- Donald MacBeth Kennedy, Progressive, Edmonton West, AB, 1921, Peace River, AL, 1925-1926(as UFA)-1930 (def. 1935 as CCF) (Ginger Group member)
- Dougald Kennedy, Progressive, Port Arthur and Kenora, ON, 1921 (ret? 1925)
- John Warwick King, Progressive, Huron North, ON, 1921-1925-1926 (died 1927, Prog. lose by-election)
- Andrew Knox, Progressive, Prince Albert, SK, 1921 (def. 1925, first elected 1917 as Liberal Unionist)
- Harry Leader, Progressive, Portage la Prairie, MB, 1921 (def. 1925, elected 1935 as Liberal)
- Arthur John Lewis, Progressive, Swift Current, SK, 1921 (def. 1925&1926)
- William James Lovie, Progressive, Macdonald, MB, 1921-1925-1926 (ret? 1930)
- William Thomas Lucas - farmer, Victoria - elected UFA 1921 Camrose 1925-1926-1930 (def as Conservative 1935)
- Agnes Campbell Macphail, Progressive, Grey Southeast, ON, 1921-1925-1926-1930, Grey-Bruce, ON (as UFO-Labour) (def. 1940) (Ginger Group member from 1924, founding member of CCF, sat with CCF caucus from inception)
- Thomas George McBride, Progressive, Cariboo, BC, 1921 (def. 1925)
- Thomas Henry McConica, Progressive, Battlefod, SK, 1921 (ret? 1925, riding abolished)
- Neil Haman McTaggart, Progressive, Maple Creek, SK, 1921 (def. 1925)
- John Millar, Progressive, Qu'Appelle, SK, 1921-1925 (re-elected as Liberal-Progressive 1926, def. 1930)
- Robert Milne, Progressive, Neepawa, MB, 1921 (def. 1925) 1926 (def. 1930)
- John Morrison, Progressive, Weyburn, SK, 1921 (def. 1925, 1926)
- Alan Webster Neill, Progressive, Comox-Alberni, BC, 1921 (re-elected as Independent 1925-1926-1930-1935-1940, aligned with Liberals)
- John Pritchard, Progressive, Wellington North, ON, 1921 (def. 1925)
- William Samuel Reed, Progressive, Frontenac, ON, 1921 (def. Frontenac-Addington, 1925)
- Thomas Edwin Ross, Progressive, Simcoe North, ON, 1921 (ret?. 1925)
- Thomas Sales, Progressive, Saltcoats, SK, 1921 (ret? 1925)
- Edward James Sexsmith, Progressive, Lennox and Addington, ON, 1921 (def. 1925)
- Henry Elvins Spencer, Progressive, Battle River, AB, 1921-1925-1926(asUFA)-1930) (def. as CCF 1935-1940-1945) (Ginger Group member)
- James Steedsman, Progressive, Souris, MB, 1921-1925-1926 (def. 1930)
- Charles Wallace Stewart, Progressive, Humboldt, SK, 1921 (def. 1925)
- John Alexander Wallace, Progressive, Norfolk, ON, 1921 (ret? 1925 riding abolished, def as CCF 1945)
- William John Ward, Progressive, Dauphin, MB, 1921-1925 (switches to Liberal-Progressive, re-elected 1926, def 1930, re-elected 1935-1940-1949 as Liberal def 1945)
- Daniel Webster Warner, Progressive, Strathcona, AB, 1921, (def. 1925 in Wesaskiwin, AL) (first elected as Laurier Liberal in Battle River, AB, 1917)
- Robert John Woods, Progressive, Dufferin, ON, 1921 (def. 1925)
- William Charles Good, Independent Progressive, Brant, ON, 1921 (ret? 1925) (Ginger Group member)
- William Thomas Lucas, UFA, Victoria, AB, 1921, Camrose, AL, 1925-1926-1930 (def as Conservative 1935)
- Alfred Speakman, UFA, Red Deer, AL, 1921-1925-1926-1930 (def. as CCF 1935) (Ginger Group member)
- Robert Henry Halbert, UFO, Ontario North, ON, 1921 (def. as Progressive 1925; first elected as Independent 1919by)

=== 1923 by-election ===
- Edward Nicholas Hopkins, Progressive, Moose Jaw, SK (succeeds RM Johnston, def. 1925)

== 15th Parliament (1925-1926) ==
21+3

- Arthur-Lucien Beaubien, Progressive, Provencher, MB, 1925 (re-elected 1926-1930 as Liberal-Progressive, 1935 as Liberal; first elected 1921 as Liberal)
- Arthur Moren Boutillier, Progressive, Vegreville, AB, 1925 (ret? 1926, succeeded by Luchkovich, UFA)
- William Russell Fansher, Progressive, Lake Mountain, SK, 1925-1926 (def 1930, def. 1935-1940 as CCF) (Ginger Group member)

== 16th Parliament (1926-1930) ==
20 +3 (inc. 11 UFA)

- William Irvine, UFA, Wetaskiwin, AB, 1926-1935 (def. 1935 as CCF) (Ginger Group member), (previously a Labour MP from 1921-1925 for East Calgary, later CCF MP for Cariboo, BC, 1945-1949)
- Michael Luchkovich, UFA, Vegreville, AB, 1926-1930 (def. 1935 as CCF) (Ginger Group member)
- Beniah Bowman, UFO, Algoma East, ON, 1926 (def. 1930 as Liberal)

== 17th Parliament (1930-1935) ==
12 (9 UFA + 3Progressive)

== 18th Parliament (1935-1940) ==
1 UFO-Labour (Agnes Macphail) sitting with CCF
