= List of Labour MPs (Canada) =

This article lists Wikipedia articles about Members of Parliament, in the House of Commons of Canada elected as Labour (or Independent Labour) MPs. Labour and Independent Labour MPs founded the Ginger Group in 1924 with individual, left-wing United Farmers and Progressive and/or Independent MPs, Of Labour MPs in the 1920s and 1930s only Malcolm Lang and Humphrey Mitchell were not in the Ginger Group. After 1932, labour-oriented MPs served under the CCF label.

See also List of Progressive/United Farmer MPs, List of articles about CCF/NDP members

Listed in order of first election:

== 8th Parliament ==
=== 1900 (by-election) ===
- Arthur Puttee - Labour/Independent Labour - Winnipeg, Manitoba, 1900 (by-election)-1900 (gen. election), def. 1904

== 9th Parliament ==
=== 1900 general election ===
- Ralph Smith - Labour/Liberal - Vancouver, BC, 1900-1904-1908, def. 1911 (elected as Labour in 1900 but takes seat as a Liberal)

=== 1906 (by-election) ===
- Alphonse Verville - Labour - Maisonneuve, Quebec, 1906-1908-1911-1911-1917 (re-elected as "Laurier Liberal" in 1917)

== 13th Parliament ==
=== 1919 by-election ===
- John Wilfred Kennedy - United Farmers of Ontario-Labour - Glengarry & Stormont, Ontario, 1919-1921 (re-elected as Progressive in 1921)

== 14th Parliament ==
=== 1921 general election ===
0+3

- James Shaver Woodsworth - Labour - Winnipeg Centre, Manitoba - 1921-1925-1926-1930-1935-1940 (Ginger Group member, leader of CCF from 1932)
- William Irvine - Labour - East Calgary, Alberta - 1921, def. 1925, later elected as UFA and CCF (Ginger Group member)
- Joseph Tweed Shaw - Independent, but supported by Labour and the United Farmers of Alberta - Calgary West, Alberta - 1921, def. 1925 (Ginger Group Member) (ran for Liberals in 1935 and defeated)

== 15th Canadian Parliament ==
=== 1925 general election ===
- J.S. Woodsworth (re-elected)
- Abraham Albert Heaps.

== 16th Parliament ==
=== 1926 general election ===
2+2

- Abraham Albert Heaps (re-elected)
- Herbert Bealey Adshead - Labour - Calgary East, Alberta, 1926, def. 1930 (Ginger Group Member)
- Malcolm Lang - Labour - Timiskaming South, Ontario, 1926, def.1930 (as Liberal-Labour)

== 17th Parliament ==
=== 1930 general election ===
2+1

- J.S. Woodsworth (re-elected)
- Angus MacInnis - Independent Labour - Vancouver South, British Columbia, 1930-1935-1940-1945-1949-1953 (Ginger Group Member, founding member of CCF, elected as CCF beg 1935, did not run 1957)
- Abraham Albert Heaps (re-elected)

=== 1931 by-election ===
- Humphrey Mitchell - Labour - Hamilton 1931 (def. 1935, later elected as a Liberal)

== 18th Parliament ==
=== 1935 general election ===
- J.S. Woodsworth (re-elected)
- Abraham Albert Heaps (re-elected)
- Agnes Macphail - United Farmers of Ontario-Labour - Grey-Bruce, Ontario, 1935 (sits with CCF, elected in four prior elections as UFO or Progressive and founding member of Ginger Group, def. 1940)
