= Dorise Nielsen =

Canadian politician (1902–1980)

Dorise W. Nielsen
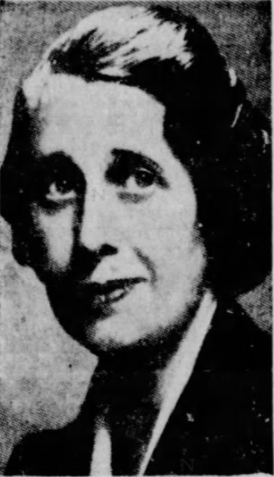
- Dorise Nielsen, 1942

Member of Parliament for North Battleford
- In office March 26, 1940 – June 10, 1945
- Preceded by: Cameron Ross McIntosh
- Succeeded by: Frederick Townley-Smith

Personal details
- Born: Doris Webber; July 30, 1902 London, England
- Died: December 9, 1980 (aged 78) Beijing, China
- Resting place: Babaoshan Revolutionary Cemetery, Shijingshan District, Beijing
- Party: Communist Party of Canada; Labor-Progressive (1943–1959); United Progressive (1940–1943); Cooperative Commonwealth Federation (1934–1943)
- Spouse: Peter Nielsen (sep. 1940, died 1956)
- Children: 4 (1 died in infancy)
- Occupation: Teacher

Dorise Winifred Nielsen (30 July 1902 – 9 December 1980) was a communist politician, feminist and teacher. She was the first member of the Communist Party of Canada to be elected to the House of Commons of Canada, serving in the House of Commons from 1940 to 1945. Later she moved to the People's Republic of China, where she lived for the final 23 years of her life until her death in 1980.

== Biography ==
=== Before politics ===
Born in London, England, Doris Webber arrived in Canada and settled in Saskatchewan in 1927 to work as a teacher and married Peter Nielsen, a homesteader, the same year. Adding an 'e' to her given name on her marriage certificate, she became Dorise Nielsen.

=== Political career ===
She joined the Co-operative Commonwealth Federation (CCF) in 1934 as part of its left-wing faction, and was a CCF campaign manager during the 1938 provincial election. By 1937, she joined the Communist Party of Canada but did not disclose her membership until 1943 remaining a member of the CCF until her riding association was dissolved because of its support of a popular front campaign with the Communists.

She won a seat in the 1940 federal election representing the Saskatchewan riding of North Battleford on the "United Progressives" label. She beat the Liberal candidate in a two-way race. Canada banned the Communist Party in June 1940 due to the party's opposition to the war.

She was the first member of the Communist Party of Canada to be elected to the House of Commons of Canada, serving during World War II. She was the third woman to serve in the House of Commons and the first to still be raising young children while holding political office. Nielsen, through indirect contact with Montreal-based Communist leaders who had escaped imprisonment, was a spokesperson for the Communist Party through speeches she made in the House of Commons.

When the Labor-Progressive Party was officially formed in 1943 as a legal front for the still banned Communist Party, Nielsen declared her affiliation with the party and was elected to its national executive committee. She ran for re-election in the 1945 election for the Labor-Progressive Party (the name the Communist Party would use until 1959), but came in third behind the Cooperative Commonwealth Federation and Liberal candidates with 13% of the vote.

While serving on the Reconstruction and Re-Establishment Committee in 1944, Nielsen voiced her opposition to the Canadian Indian residential school system.

"I am very much in favour of the day school in preference to the residential school. I do not like residential schools at all. They segregate children and lose a great deal of the value of the education. I do not think they are half as good."

After her defeat, she and her children moved to Toronto where she worked as an organizer for the Labor-Progressive Party and wrote a weekly column for its newspaper, Canadian Tribune, called "Women's Place is Everywhere". At times she used the column to promote feminist views; for example, as related by her biographer, Faith Johnston, in 1949 she "explained that only when a socialist economy lifted the burdens of child care and housework from the shoulders of individual women would they be able to compete with men on an equal footing. 'It is being tied to all the multitudinous tasks of home and family that robs women of the opportunity to compete with men, not her inferiority." She helped found the Congress of Canadian Women and attended the Women's International Democratic Federation Peace Congress in Budapest in 1948 and helped found the Canadian Peace Congress the next year.

In 1949, she became executive secretary of the Canadian-Soviet Friendship Association and organized national tours and local chapters, distributed films and books, and did most of the organizational work for the association. Frustrated by having to play second fiddle to CSFA president Dyson Carter and being paid a lower salary than him, she resigned in the summer of 1953.

She ran again for the LPP in the 1953 election, this time in Brantford, Ontario, but came in last place with 216 votes.

=== After politics ===
Finding it difficult to find work outside of the party due to her age and possibly blacklisted due to her Communist allegiance, she found a job in the mid-1950s working in the office of the United Electrical Workers but found it dull, and left Canada in 1955 for London, England with her partner, Constant Godefroy (she had been estranged from husband Pete Nielsen since 1940). They returned to Canada in 1956, and Nielsen found a job clipping articles for Maclean-Hunter Publishing.

In 1957, Nielsen and Godefroy received permission to go to the People's Republic of China, where she lived for the final 23 years of her life. She spent most of those years working as an English teacher and as an editor for the Foreign Languages Press in Beijing.

She became a Chinese citizen in 1962. Nielsen died in Beijing on December 9, 1980 at the age of 78 due to untreated liver cancer, and is buried in Beijing at the Babaoshan Revolutionary Cemetery.

== Family ==
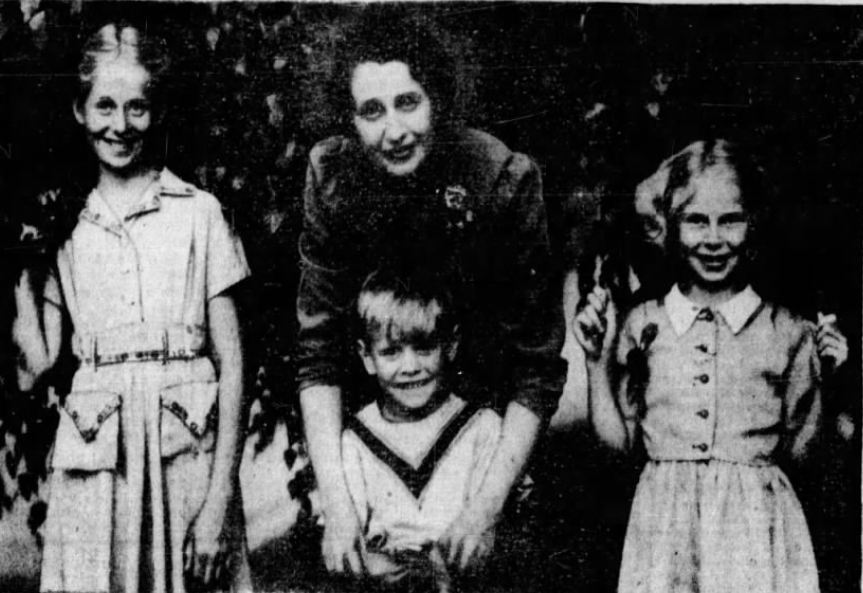
Nielsen with her children Christine, John and Sally (1940)

Dorise and Peter Nielsen had four children, one of whom died in infancy. Their youngest daughter was Thelma Nielsen, known as Sally (born 1931), who in 1980 married Dyson Carter, Dorise Nielsen's former superior at the Canadian-Soviet Friendship Association.

== Election results ==
1953 Canadian federal election: Brantford
Party	Candidate	Votes
Liberal	James Elisha Brown	9,576
Progressive Conservative	John Tozeland Shillington	7,912
Co-operative Commonwealth	John Houison Gillies	3,839
Labor–Progressive	Dorise Winifred Nielsen	216

1945 Canadian federal election: North Battleford
Party	Candidate	Votes	%	±%
Co-operative Commonwealth	Frederick W. Townley-Smith	5,049	31.55	
Liberal	John Hornby Harrison	4,420	27.62	–15.22
Labor–Progressive	Dorise W. Nielsen	2,124	13.27	–43.89
Progressive Conservative	Albert C. Cadieu	2,039	12.74	
Social Credit	John William Evanishen	1,525	9.53	
Independent Liberal	Cameron Ross McIntosh	847	5.29	–37.55
Total valid votes		16,004	100.0	
Co-operative Commonwealth gain from Unity		Swing		+23.38

1940 Canadian federal election: North Battleford
Party	Candidate	Votes	%	±%
Unity	Dorise W. Nielsen	10,500	57.16	
Liberal	Cameron Ross McIntosh	7,868	42.84	–2.23
Total valid votes		18,368	100.0	
Unity gain from Liberal		Swing		+29.70

== Archives ==
There is a Dorise Nielsen fonds at Library and Archives Canada. Archival reference number is R4012.
