= North Battleford (federal electoral district) =

Former federal electoral district in Saskatchewan, Canada

Saskatchewan electoral district

Defunct federal electoral district
- Legislature: House of Commons
- District created: 1914
- District abolished: 1947
- First contested: 1917
- Last contested: 1945

North Battleford was a federal electoral district in Saskatchewan, Canada, that was represented in the House of Commons of Canada from 1917 to 1949. This riding was created in 1914 from parts of Battleford, Prince Albert and Saskatoon ridings. It initially consisted of the northwestern part of the province, north of the North Saskatchewan River and west of the third meridian. It was redefined in 1924 and 1933.

The electoral district was abolished in 1947 when it was redistributed into Prince Albert, Rosetown—Biggar and The Battlefords ridings.

== Members of Parliament ==
Parliament	Years	Member	Party
North Battleford; Riding created from Battleford, Prince Albert and Saskatoon
13th	1917–1921	Charles Edwin Long	Government (Unionist)
14th	1921–1925	Claudius Charles Davies	Progressive
15th	1925–1926	Cameron Ross McIntosh	Liberal
16th	1926–1930	Cameron Ross McIntosh	Liberal
17th	1930–1935	Cameron Ross McIntosh	Liberal
18th	1935–1940	Cameron Ross McIntosh	Liberal
19th	1940–1943	Dorise Nielsen	Unity
19th	1943–1945	Dorise Nielsen	Labor–Progressive
20th	1945–1949	Frederick Townley-Smith	Co-operative Commonwealth
Riding dissolved into Prince Albert, Rosetown—Biggar and The Battlefords

== Election results ==
1945 Canadian federal election
Party	Candidate	Votes	%	±%
Co-operative Commonwealth	Frederick W. Townley-Smith	5,049	31.55	
Liberal	John Hornby Harrison	4,420	27.62	–15.22
Labor–Progressive	Dorise W. Nielsen	2,124	13.27	–43.89
Progressive Conservative	Albert C. Cadieu	2,039	12.74	
Social Credit	John William Evanishen	1,525	9.53	
Independent Liberal	Cameron Ross McIntosh	847	5.29	–37.55
Total valid votes		16,004	100.0	
Co-operative Commonwealth gain from Labor–Progressive		Swing		+23.38

1940 Canadian federal election
Party	Candidate	Votes	%	±%
Unity	Dorise W. Nielsen	10,500	57.16	
Liberal	Cameron Ross McIntosh	7,868	42.84	–2.23
Total valid votes		18,368	100.0	
Unity gain from Liberal		Swing		+29.70

1935 Canadian federal election
Party	Candidate	Votes	%	±%
Liberal	Cameron Ross McIntosh	7,039	45.07	–1.21
Social Credit	Robert Harry Watson	4,412	28.25	
Co-operative Commonwealth	Hill Hamilton	4,168	26.69	
Total valid votes		15,619	100.0	
Liberal hold		Swing		–14.73

1930 Canadian federal election
Party	Candidate	Votes	%	±%
Liberal	Cameron Ross McIntosh	7,168	46.28	–21.29
Independent	William Mackenzie	6,073	39.21	
Progressive	Arthur O. Rose	2,248	14.51	
Total valid votes		15,489	100.0	
Liberal hold		Swing		–30.25

1926 Canadian federal election
Party	Candidate	Votes	%	±%
Liberal	Cameron Ross McIntosh	6,147	67.57	+19.42
Conservative	Charles Edwin Long	2,950	32.43	+11.47
Total valid votes		9,097	100.0	
Liberal hold		Swing		+3.98

1925 Canadian federal election
Party	Candidate	Votes	%	±%
Liberal	Cameron Ross McIntosh	4,204	48.15	
Progressive	Claudius Charles Davies	2,697	30.89	–31.31
Conservative	Leonard Arthur Cattanach Panton	1,830	20.96	
Total valid votes		8,731	100.0	
Liberal gain from Progressive		Swing		+39.73

1921 Canadian federal election
Party	Candidate	Votes	%	±%
Progressive	Claudius Charles Davies	8,786	62.20	
Unknown	William Wellington Livingston	4,596	32.54	
Unknown	Harold Herbert	744	5.27	
Total valid votes		14,126	100.0	
Progressive gain from Government (Unionist)		Swing		+14.83

1917 Canadian federal election
Party	Candidate	Votes	%
Government (Unionist)	Charles Edwin Long	5,630	60.14
Opposition (Laurier Liberals)	Charles Comerford	3,732	39.86
Total valid votes		9,362	100.0
This riding was created from parts of Battleford, Prince Albert and Saskatoon, which elected two Conservatives and a Liberal (respectively) in the last election.

== See also ==
- List of Canadian electoral districts
- Historical federal electoral districts of Canada
