= United Farmers of Quebec =

- Former provincial party
- Founded: 1918
- Dissolved: 1924
- Ideology: Agrarianism; Progressivism; Social Democracy
- Colours: Green

The United Farmers of Quebec (Fermiers unis de Québec) were founded in 1918 as part of the broader United Farmers movement in of Canada.

The genesis of the organization was in protests resulting from the Conscription Crisis of 1917 against the attempt of Robert Borden's federal government to conscript farm youths into the Canadian military during World War I. Quebec farmers organized a large demonstration on Parliament Hill in Ottawa on May 15, 1918, bringing them into contact with the United Farmers national movement.

The Quebec farmers organized 20 associations in western Quebec and in July 1918 organized the Interprovincial Union of Farmers as an umbrella group. By this time renamed to United Farmers of Québec, a conference held in Montreal in January 1920 finalized the organizational structure and elected A. H. Clement as president. As for 1921, UFQ had 5,000 members in 20 counties.

From the beginning, UFQ was involved in politics, supporting Nérée Morin in 1920 provincial by-election in Kamouraska, and later nominating Joseph Lambert in 1921 federal by-election in Yamaska.

At the Montreal convention in October 1921, the United Farmers and the Union des cultivateurs du Québec formed the Parti fermier-progressiste du Québec (Progressive Farmers of Québec) with the support of Joseph-Noé Ponton and the Bulletin des agriculteurs. The party was inspired by both the program of the Progressive Party of Canada and the nationalism of Henri Bourassa, and included, in particular, the development of natural resources, respect for human rights, reduction of military spending and opposition to conscription.

The party supported 21 candidates, most of whom ran in conjunction with the Progressive Party of Canada in the 1921 federal election, but none were elected. The farmers' candidates won 42,000 votes, or 11% of the total in Quebec.

By 1924, the group had been overshadowed by the more conservative Catholic Union of Farmers, which later became Union des producteurs agricoles.

== Electoral results ==
1921 Canadian federal election
Riding	Candidate	Votes	%	Position
Bagot	Louis-Homer Marcotte	3,034	42.8	2/3
Bellechasse	Joseph Cléophas Cote	1,109	17.6	2/2
Champlain	Auguste Trudel	2,090	12.3	3/3
Drummond—Arthabaska	Wilfrid Blanchard	2,154	13.6	2/4
Hull	Sylvio Lafortune	2,510	17.3	2/2
Châteauguay—Huntingdon	Peter Daniel McArthur	4,061	38.6	2/3
Joliette	Paplinuce Bonin	265	2.6	3/3
Kamouraska	Joseph Langlais	2,483	34.0	2/2
Labelle	Jean Lachance	2,893	27.8	2/3
Laval—Two Mountains	Aglibert Théoret	3,479	34.6	2/3
Nicolet	Fortunat Proulx	2,271	21.5	2/3
Pontiac	George Arthur Landon	1,760	10.6	3/3
Richmond—Wolfe	Azarie Lemire	2,986	22.4	2/2
Rimouski	Alfred Lavoie	1,247	16.4	2/2
Vaudreuil—Soulanges	Julien Charlebois	293	3.5	2/3
Wright	Herbert Miller Ellard	1,590	20.8	2/3
