= Claudius Charles Davies =

Canadian politician (1879–1936)

Member of Parliament for North Battleford
- In office December 1921 – October 1925
- Preceded by: Charles Edwin Long
- Succeeded by: Cameron Ross McIntosh

Personal details
- Born: Claudius Charles Davies; 2 July 1879 Bracknell, England
- Died: 12 May 1936 (aged 56) North Battleford, Saskatchewan
- Party: Progressive
- Spouse: Edna Ralston
- Profession: farmer

Claudius Charles Davies (2 July 1879 – 12 May 1936) was a Progressive party member of the House of Commons of Canada. He was born in Bracknell, England, the son of Thomas James Davis and Amelia Lane, came to Canada in 1900 and became a farmer in North Battleford, Saskatchewan.

In 1913, Davies married Edna Ralston. He was elected to Parliament at the North Battleford riding in the 1921 general election. After serving his only federal term, the 14th Canadian Parliament, Davies was defeated by Cameron Ross McIntosh of the Liberal party in the 1925 election.

Davies was also a director of the Saskatchewan Grain Growers' Association.
