= Dyson Carter =

Canadian scientist, lecturer and writer

- Born: Herbert Dyson Carter; February 2, 1910; Saint John, New Brunswick
- Died: December 15, 1996 (aged 86); Gravenhurst, Ontario
- Other name: Warren Desmond
- Education: University of Manitoba
- Occupations: Author, politician, scientist
- Political party: Communist Party of Canada
- Other political affiliations: Labor-Progressive Party
- Awards: Order of the Union of Friendship Societies, Centenary Medal, Order of Friendship of Peoples,

Herbert Dyson Carter (February 2, 1910 – December 15, 1996), known as Dyson Carter, was a Canadian scientist, lecturer, writer, and Communist propagandist and organiser who served as president of the Canadian-Soviet Friendship Society from 1949 to 1960.

During his fifty-year writing career, Carter produced hundreds of magazine and newspaper articles, dozens of short stories, and 17 books including five novels. Many of his non-fiction books and articles popularized scientific ideas and discoveries or reported on medical advances. In the 1930s and 1940s, many of his articles appeared in popular magazines in Canada and the United States and three of his books were published by large commercial publishers in the United States and widely reviewed.

He occasionally used the pseudonym Warren Desmond for popular fiction that he would otherwise would not have been able to sell in the United States due to McCarthyism.

== Early life ==
Carter was born in Saint John, New Brunswick, to Gertrude and William R. Carter, members of the Salvation Army who had been sent from Britain first to Bermuda and then to Canada to work for the church. In 1912, the Carters became matron and superintendent, respectively, of the Provincial Detention Home for Juveniles in Winnipeg, where Dyson Carter would grow up and go to school. Carter had osteogenesis imperfecta, which made his bones brittle throughout his life and often required him to stay in bed or walk with crutches, or later use a wheelchair.

== Education ==
Carter received his Bachelor of Science in 1931 and his Master of Science degree in chemistry from the University of Manitoba in 1933 and subsequently worked as a university lecturer, a researcher and an engineering consultant in addition to his writing career.

== Literary career ==
Carter wrote in a number of genres including popular science, health, socialist realist fiction, romance, and biography.

His works included Sea of Destiny: the Story of Hudson Bay, Our Undefended Back Door (1940), a book that argued the Canadian north was susceptible to Nazi invasion and should be developed and militarized along the lines of the Soviet north in order to prevent such an eventuality, Night of Flame (1942), a novel set in a hospital that explored themes of class conflict, and Stalin's Life (1943), a hagiographical biography of Stalin.

In the 1930s and 1940s, Carter's articles were published in popular magazines such as Saturday Night, Star Weekly, and Maclean's and in various American publications such as the pulp magazine Argosy.

He was made a member of the Royal Canadian Geographical Society in 1941, but was essentially blacklisted by the popular media after 1945 when he made public his membership in the Labor-Progressive Party (as the Communist Party of Canada was known at the time). He had joined the Communist Party in 1931 but had kept his membership secret for over a decade.

Many of his books were translated into Russian and other languages and distributed throughout the Soviet Union and Eastern Bloc countries, and many of his articles were translated and carried in Soviet publications.

== Canadian-Soviet Friendship Society and Northern Neighbors ==
As well as being president of the CSFSS from 1949 to 1960, with Dorise Nielsen as executive secretary, and engaging in national lecture tours to promote friendship with the Soviet Union, Carter was editor and publisher of the Canadian-Soviet Friendship Society's newsletter, News-Facts About the USSR from 1950 to 1956 and of the glossy pro-Soviet magazine Northern Neighbors from 1956 to 1989.

Carter's pro-Soviet writings never deviated from the party line, following its twists and turns. The invasion of Hungary in 1956 and the Warsaw Pact invasion of Czechoslovakia in 1968 were presented from the Soviet point of view. According to historian Jennifer Anderson, who researched Carter's life and work:

"Dyson Carter eventually recognized the message did not correspond with reality, but not until Mikhail Gorbachev's policy of glasnost had made speaking openly about Soviet 'falsifications' possible. In 1990, Carter wrote that he had spent 40 years producing 'bullshit.'"

Carter added: "I publicized so many Soviet 'achievements' that were total falsifications, that I consider my 'work' an exercise in political pathology."

He was awarded several honours by the Soviet Union including the Centenary Medal (1970), the Order of Friendship of the Peoples (1980) and the Order of the Union of Friendship Societies (1985).
