= George Porteous =

Canadian politician

The Honourable George Porteous CM MBE

14th Lieutenant Governor of Saskatchewan
- In office February 29, 1976 – February 6, 1978
- Monarch: Elizabeth II
- Governor General: Jules Léger
- Premier: Allan Blakeney
- Preceded by: Stephen Worobetz
- Succeeded by: Irwin McIntosh

Personal details
- Born: April 7, 1903 Douglas, Lanarkshire, Scotland
- Died: February 6, 1978 (aged 74) Regina, Saskatchewan, Canada
- Education: University of Saskatchewan
- Occupation: Community organizer, director

George Porteous CM MBE (April 7, 1903 – February 6, 1978) was the 14th lieutenant governor of Saskatchewan, from 1976 to 1978.

== Early life ==
George Porteous was born in Douglas, Lanarkshire, Scotland on 7 April 1903. His family emigrated to Canada in 1910 and he attended secondary school in Saskatoon, going on to the University of Saskatchewan, where he was awarded BA in 1927. He began working for the YMCA as boys’ work secretary in Saskatoon in 1922, later becoming an Army physical education instructor. At the outbreak of World War II he went with the 1st Canadian Division to England as a YMCA Auxiliary Service officer, returning later on to Canada to train others.

== War service ==
In 1941 Porteous was posted with the Winnipeg Grenadiers to Hong Kong, to reinforce the British garrison. The regiment arrived just in time to be overwhelmed by invading Japanese forces, and Porteous was to spend a total of 44 months in one of the notorious prisoner of war camps, where he remained until the end of the war. In due course he was decorated as an MBE, Member of the Order of the British Empire, for his outstanding contribution in maintaining prisoner morale while imprisoned.

== Honours ==
Porteous returned to Saskatoon after the war and was named executive director of the Saskatoon Community Chest. He was later awarded the Order of Canada in 1974 for dedication to community affairs, and was appointed Lieutenant-Governor of Saskatchewan, the Queen’s representative, on 3 March 1976, thus becoming that Province's 14th Lieutenant Governor. He died in office on 6 February 1978.

== Medical research ==
An interesting insight into Porteous' experience is that from 1960 until his death in 1978 Porteous was an enthusiastic advocate of the medical benefits of niacin. Dr. Abram Hoffer had approached him to request that he recommend it to the senior citizens in the social housing development which Porteous administered. Hoffer believed large doses of niacin, up to six grams a day, could retard the development and even reverse senility, as it dilates the blood vessels, thus improving circulation.

Porteous insisted he would not recommend anything to anyone which he had not first tried himself. For six months, he took the six grams a day and then recommended it to the senior citizens without reservation. As he told the Department of Veterans Affairs doctor on his next annual visit (he was on a 100% disability pension) that he had not felt as well since before the war; he could even touch his hands together above his head, not having been able to raise them above his shoulders before the treatment. He discovered that niacin had greatly relieved the severe arthritis and insomnia that had plagued him as a result of his wartime imprisonment and systematic starvation over a four-year period. He supported the use of this vitamin for all Canadian and US ex-prisoners of war suffering from similar symptoms.

== Bibliography ==
- Hoffer, Abram (2008), Orthomolecular Medicine for Everyone: Megavitamin Therapeutics for Families and Physicians (Vol 2), Laguna Beach, California: Basic Health Publications, ISBN 978-1-59120-226-4
