= Irwin McIntosh =

Canadian politician

The Honourable Irwin McIntosh KStJ

15th Lieutenant Governor of Saskatchewan
- In office February 22, 1978 – July 6, 1983
- Monarch: Elizabeth II
- Governors General: Jules Léger; Edward Schreyer
- Premier: Allan Blakeney; Grant Devine
- Preceded by: George Porteous
- Succeeded by: Frederick Johnson

Personal details
- Born: Cameron Irwin McIntosh; July 1, 1926 North Battleford, Saskatchewan, Canada
- Died: September 24, 1988 (aged 62)
- Parent: Cameron Ross McIntosh (father)
- Education: University of Saskatchewan
- Occupation: Businessman

Cameron Irwin McIntosh KStJ (July 1, 1926 – September 24, 1988) was the 15th lieutenant governor of Saskatchewan, from 1978 to 1983.

Born in North Battleford, Saskatchewan, the son of Cameron Ross McIntosh, McIntosh was educated at the University of Saskatchewan.

== Honorific eponyms ==
Awards

- Saskatchewan: C. Irwin McIntosh Journalism Prize
- Saskatchewan: Cameron McIntosh Memorial Cup

Honours

1978: Knight of the Most Venerable Order of the Hospital of Saint John of Jerusalem (KStJ)
