= Meadow Lake (federal electoral district) =

Former federal electoral district in Saskatchewan, Canada

Meadow Lake was a federal electoral district in Saskatchewan, Canada, that was represented in the House of Commons of Canada from 1948 to 1979. It was created in 1947 from The Battlefords ridings, and was abolished in 1976 when it was redistributed into Prince Albert and The Battlefords—Meadow Lake ridings.

== Members of Parliament ==
This riding elected the following members of Parliament:

1. John H. Harrison, Liberal (1949–1958)
2. Bert Cadieu, Progressive Conservative (1958–1972)
3. Eli Nesdoly, New Democratic Party (1972–1974)
4. Bert Cadieu, Progressive Conservative (1974–1979)

== Election results ==
1949 Canadian federal election
Party	Candidate	Votes
Liberal	John Harrison	7,078
Co-operative Commonwealth	Edward Karpetz	4,461
Progressive Conservative	Herbert L. Cathrea	1,331

1953 Canadian federal election
Party	Candidate	Votes
Liberal	John Harrison	5,080
Co-operative Commonwealth	John James Morrow	3,470
Social Credit	Martin Kelln	1,817
Progressive Conservative	Herbert Lamb Cathrea	1,079
Labor–Progressive	Herbert Roy Reid	177

1957 Canadian federal election
Party	Candidate	Votes
Liberal	John Harrison	4,140
Co-operative Commonwealth	Frank G. Warick	3,253
Social Credit	Winston Walter Gant	2,921
Progressive Conservative	Clifford Williams Reed	2,443

1958 Canadian federal election
Party	Candidate	Votes
Progressive Conservative	Bert Cadieu	6,830
Liberal	John Harrison	3,272
Co-operative Commonwealth	Frank G. Warick	2,719

1962 Canadian federal election
Party	Candidate	Votes
Progressive Conservative	Bert Cadieu	7,587
Liberal	Jack E. Kreiser	4,140
New Democratic	Angus Addley	2,834

1963 Canadian federal election
Party	Candidate	Votes
Progressive Conservative	Bert Cadieu	7,819
Liberal	Jack Harrison	3,710
New Democratic	Angus Addley	2,319

1965 Canadian federal election
Party	Candidate	Votes
Progressive Conservative	Bert Cadieu	6,919
Liberal	Franklin Foley	3,520
New Democratic	Jack Allan	2,379

1968 Canadian federal election
Party	Candidate	Votes
Progressive Conservative	Bert Cadieu	7,688
New Democratic	Eli Nesdoly	6,080
Liberal	Bert Jackson	4,932
Independent	Carole D. Lavalee	689

1972 Canadian federal election
Party	Candidate	Votes
New Democratic	Eli Nesdoly	7,194
Progressive Conservative	Bert Cadieu	7,171
Liberal	Frank Falle	4,948
Social Credit	Ivar M. Hoback	619

1974 Canadian federal election
Party	Candidate	Votes
Progressive Conservative	Bert Cadieu	7,419
New Democratic	Eli Nesdoly	6,743
Liberal	Paul Loiselle	4,684
Social Credit	Ivar Hoback	448

== See also ==
- List of Canadian electoral districts
- Historical federal electoral districts of Canada
