= Cameron Ross McIntosh =

Canadian politician

Member of Parliament for North Battleford
- In office 1925–1940
- Preceded by: Claudius Charles Davies
- Succeeded by: Dorise Nielsen

Personal details
- Born: July 7, 1871 Dornoch, Ontario
- Died: August 8, 1971 (aged 100) Canada
- Party: Liberal Party of Canada
- Children: Irwin McIntosh and Margaret (Peggy) Todd
- Profession: Merchant

Cameron Ross McIntosh (July 7, 1871 – August 8, 1971) was a Canadian politician and newspaper publisher. He was born in Dornoch, Ontario, in 1871. McIntosh served as a high school principal before his career in the public arena.

== Publishing career ==
In 1912, McIntosh acquired the North Battleford News, a Saskatchewan newspaper that had been established several years earlier. Additionally, in the same year, McIntosh founded the McIntosh Publishing Company and served as its president and publisher until his passing in 1971. Following his death, his son Irwin assumed the role of president and publisher.

== Political career ==
In 1925, Cameron McIntosh won election to the Parliament of Canada and served in the House of Commons of Canada as a Liberal MP until he was defeated in 1940 by Dorise Nielsen. During his fifteen-year tenure in government, McIntosh served as chairman of the Industry and International Relations Standing Committee and towards the end of his parliamentary career was adviser to Canada's delegates to the International Labor Conference in Geneva.

== Later years ==
At age 88, McIntosh received a CWNA (Canadian Weekly Newspapers Association) Honorary Life Membership. Cameron Ross McIntosh died thirty-two days after his 100th birthday in 1971. He is one of only six members of the Canadian Parliament to reach centenarian status, the others being David Wark (1805–1906), Georges-Casimir Dessaulles (1827–1930), Sir William Mulock (1844–1944), Norman McLeod Paterson (1883–1983) and Charles Willoughby (1894–1995).

== Links and references ==
- Cameron Ross McIntosh – Parliament of Canada biography
