= Frederick Townley-Smith =

Canadian politician

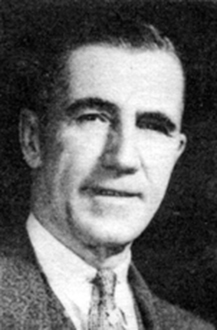

Member of Parliament for North Battleford
- In office June 1945 – April 1949
- Preceded by: Dorise Nielsen
- Succeeded by: riding dissolved

Personal details
- Born: Frederick William Townley-Smith; 2 April 1887 Leicestershire, England
- Died: 5 July 1961 (aged 74)
- Party: Co-operative Commonwealth Federation
- Spouse(s): Rosa Mary Renals m. 30 August 1910
- Profession: farmer

Frederick William Townley-Smith (2 April 1887 – 5 July 1961) was a Co-operative Commonwealth Federation member of the House of Commons of Canada. He was born in Leicestershire, England and became a farmer by career.

Townley-Smith moved to Canada in 1903. He was educated at Loughborough in the United Kingdom.

He was elected to Parliament at the North Battleford riding in the 1945 general election and served one term, the 20th Canadian Parliament, then did not seek re-election in the 1949 election.
