= Eli Nesdoly =

Canadian politician

Elias Nesdoly

MP for Meadow Lake
- In office January 4, 1973 – May 9, 1974
- Preceded by: Bert Cadieu
- Succeeded by: Bert Cadieu

Personal details
- Born: January 21, 1931 Blaine Lake, Saskatchewan, Canada
- Died: July 25, 2013 (aged 82) Shellbrook, Saskatchewan
- Party: New Democrat
- Profession: School principal, teacher

Elias (Eli) Nesdoly, B.A., B.Ed., M.Ed. (January 21, 1931 – July 25, 2013) was a Canadian politician who served in the House of Commons. He first ran in the district of Meadow Lake in the 1968 election and was defeated by the incumbent, Bert Cadieu of the Progressive Conservative Party. He ran against Cadieu again in the 1972 election and won. He served on the Standing Committee on Agriculture until the 1974 election, when Cadieu defeated him in a rematch. He ran for Parliament once more in the district of The Battlefords—Meadow Lake in 1979, but was defeated by Terry Nylander of the Progressive Conservative Party.
