= Charles Edwin Long =

Canadian politician

Charles Edwin Long (21 August 1879 – 4 August 1953) was an American-born farmer and political figure in Saskatchewan, Canada. He represented North Battleford in the House of Commons of Canada from 1917 to 1921 as a Unionist Party member.

He was born in Davenport, Iowa, the son of Edwin F. Long and Lilly L. Stulz, and was educated at the University of Wisconsin. Long came to Canada in 1906, settling on a farm at North Battleford, Saskatchewan. In 1910, he married Ethel Agnes Agnew. Long did not run for reelection in 1921 but was defeated when he attempted to regain his seat in the House of Commons as a Conservative in 1926. He died in North Battleford at the age of 73.
