= John Harrison (Canadian politician) =

Canadian politician

Member of Parliament for Meadow Lake
- In office June 1949 – March 1958
- Preceded by: riding created
- Succeeded by: Bert Cadieu

Personal details
- Born: John Hornby Harrison; 23 May 1908 Bradford, England
- Died: 24 September 1964 (aged 56) Green Lake, Saskatchewan
- Party: Liberal
- Spouse: Margaret F. Thomas
- Profession: agent, merchant, trader

John Hornby Harrison (23 May 1908 – 24 September 1964) was a Liberal party member of the House of Commons of Canada.

He was born in Bradford, England, to May (née Smith) and W. H. Harrison. He moved to Canada in 1913, and became an agent, merchant and trader by career.

He was first elected to Parliament at the Meadow Lake riding in the 1949 general election after an unsuccessful bid for the North Battleford riding in the 1945 election. Harrison was re-elected at Meadow Lake for successive terms in 1949, 1953 and 1957. Harrison was defeated in 1958 by Bert Cadieu of the Progressive Conservative party. He was also unsuccessful in unseating Cadieu in the 1963 election.

His son-in-law was former MP, Nova Scotia MLA and Premier of Nova Scotia Gerald Regan, and his grandchildren are Halifax West MP (and former Speaker of the House of Commons) Geoff Regan, journalist and actress Nancy Regan, and actress Laura Regan.
