= Bert Cadieu =

Canadian politician

- Official 1974 portrait

MP for Meadow Lake
- In office 1958–1972
- Preceded by: John Harrison
- Succeeded by: Eli Nesdoly
- In office 1974–1979
- Preceded by: Eli Nesdoly
- Succeeded by: district abolished

Personal details
- Born: 28 June 1903 Prince Albert, Saskatchewan
- Died: 31 October 1990 (aged 87) Saskatchewan, Canada
- Party: Progressive Conservative Party
- Occupation: contractor, farmer, rancher

Albert Charles Cadieu (28 June 1903 – 31 October 1990) was a Canadian politician. A member of the Progressive Conservative Party, he represented the electoral district of Meadow Lake in the House of Commons of Canada from 1958 to 1972, for the 24th through 28th Canadian Parliaments inclusive, and again during the 30th Parliament from 1974 to 1979. He served on many standing committees throughout his parliamentary career, including Agriculture; Fisheries; Indian Affairs and Northern Development; Mines, Forests and Water; and Transport and Communications.

== Archives ==
There is an Albert Cadieu fonds at Library and Archives Canada. Archival reference number is R5489.
