= Ginger Group =

Political faction in Canada

- Leader: J. S. Woodsworth (de facto)
- Founded: 1924
- Dissolved: 1932
- Preceded by: Independent labour MPs; Progressive Party (leftist faction)
- Merged into: Cooperative Commonwealth Federation
- Ideology: Socialism; Democratic socialism; Social democracy
- Political position: Left-wing

The Ginger Group was a grouping of various activist MPs in Canada in existence from the 1920s to the 1930s. It included Progressive and Labour Members of Parliament who advocated socialism. The Group was voluntary and not a formal political party. The term ginger group may also refer to any group with new ideas that tries to act as a catalyst ("ginger") within a larger body. It is the political equivalent of gingering, a horse-trading trick used by some farmers.

== History ==
The Ginger Group split with the Progressive Party in 1924 when Progressive leader Robert Forke appeared to accommodate the Liberal government of William Lyon Mackenzie King and agreed to support its budget with only small concessions. J. S. Woodsworth used his right as the leader of the Independent Labour MPs to move a strong amendment to the budget putting forward demands the Progressives had made previously but had since abandoned. Progressive/Farmer and Labour MPs who broke with their Progressive colleagues to support Woodsworth became the "Ginger Group". It was made up of United Farmers of Alberta MPs George Gibson Coote, Robert Gardiner, Edward Joseph Garland, Donald MacBeth Kennedy and Henry Elvins Spencer as well as United Farmers of Ontario MP Agnes Macphail. The group also included Labour MPs J. S. Woodsworth, William Irvine, Abraham Albert Heaps and Angus MacInnis, independent MP Joseph Tweed Shaw and Progressive MPs Milton Neil Campbell, William John Ward, William Charles Good, and Preston Elliott.

Members of the Ginger Group played a role in forming the Cooperative Commonwealth Federation in 1932, with Woodsworth becoming the new party's leader.

The only sitting United Farmers of Alberta MP who did not join the CCF at its founding was William Thomas Lucas, who ran for re-election unsuccessfully as a Conservative in 1935.

The name Ginger Group was also used to refer to a group of Conservative MPs who, in 1917 opposed Prime Minister Robert Borden's use of the Military Service Act to introduce conscription during the Conscription Crisis of 1917.

== See also ==
- List of political parties in Canada
- Socialism in Canada
