= United Farmers of Canada =

- Former federal party
- Leader: Unknown
- Founded: 1926
- Dissolved: 1949
- Ideology: Agrarianism; Progressivism; Populism; Social democracy
- Colours: Green

The United Farmers of Canada was a radical farmers organization. It was established in 1926 as the United Farmers of Canada (Saskatchewan Section) as a merger of the Farmers' Union of Canada and the Saskatchewan Grain Growers' Association. The name United Farmers came from the movements that had been established and run for election, in some cases taking power, in several provinces such as the United Farmers of Ontario, the United Farmers of Alberta and federally as the Progressive Party of Canada.

The UFC campaigned in the late 1920s for a "100% pool system" in which the government would market all grain – an idea that was ultimately adopted in part in 1935 with the creation of the Canadian Wheat Board and also operated educational programs for farmers and called for reforms in the health care system and education.

With the Great Depression and the Dust Bowl the Saskatchewan Section became more militant under the leadership of George Hara Williams and decided to enter electoral politics on a socialist platform. In 1932, the UFC(SS) joined with the Independent Labour Party in Saskatchewan to form the Farmer-Labour Group which contested the 1934 Saskatchewan election winning five seats. The FLP affiliated with the new Co-operative Commonwealth Federation and became the Saskatchewan CCF which went on to take power in 1944.

The United Farmers of Canada (Alberta Section) was formed in 1938 by radical members of the declining United Farmers of Alberta and was reorganized in 1943 as the Alberta Farmers' Union. In 1949 the UFC(SS) became the Saskatchewan Farmers' Union.

The Interprovincial Farm Union Council was formed in 1945 by these and other provincial organizations which, in 1960, became the National Farmers Union.
