= Progressive Party of Canada =

20th-century political party in Canada

Progressive Party of Canada _{Parti progressiste du Canada}
- Former federal party
- Founded: 1920
- Dissolved: 1930
- Succeeded by: United Farmers of Alberta, Liberal-Progressives, Co-operative Commonwealth Federation
- Ideology: Agrarianism; Progressivism; Left-wing populism Social democracy
- Political position: Centre-left
- Colours: Green

The Progressive Party of Canada, formally the National Progressive Party, was a federal-level political party in Canada in the 1920s until 1930. It was linked with the provincial United Farmers parties in several provinces, and it spawned the Progressive Party of Saskatchewan, and the Progressive Party of Manitoba, which formed the government of that province. The Progressive Party was part of the farmers' political movement that included federal and provincial Progressive and United Farmers' parties.

The United Farmers movement in Canada rose to prominence after World War I. With the failure of the wartime Union government to alter a tariff structure that hurt farmers, various farmers movements across Canada became more radical and entered the political arena. The United Farmers movement was tied to the federal Progressive Party of Canada and formed provincial governments in Ontario, Alberta and Manitoba. It rejected the National Policy of the Conservatives, and derided the Liberals for not being strong proponents of free trade and for being too tied to business interests. Generally, farmers groups formed alliances with Labour and socialist groups. However, when in power, they behaved closer to the Liberals; this caused ruptures in several provinces between United Farmer governments and their organizations.

== Origins ==
The origins of the Progressive Party can be traced to the politics of compromise under Prime Minister Sir Wilfrid Laurier. The most important issue to farmers in western Canada at the time was free trade with the United States. The National Policy implemented by Prime Minister Sir John A. Macdonald in the 1890s forced farmers to pay higher prices for equipment and to sell their produce for less. After World War I, however, neither of the major political parties supported free trade.

At the turn of the century, voters in Western Canada began to consider an influx of radical political ideas. From the United States came Progressivism and the Non-Partisan League. From Britain, the new immigrants brought Fabian socialism. This mix of ideology and discontent led to discussion of forming an independent party, especially in the "Grain Growers' Guide", a magazine of the day. The first organizations of agricultural protest were farmers’ organizations: Manitoba Grain Growers' Association, Alberta Farmers' Association, and the United Farmers of Alberta. The first big activity was the farmers' march on Ottawa in 1911.

After World War I, farmers' organizations across Canada became more politically active and entered electoral politics on the provincial level. The United Farmers of Ontario ran in the 1919 provincial election and, surprisingly, won. The emergence of the UFO exemplified the scope of farmer politics. It was not just western opposition to the tariff and eastern economic power, It was an occupational or class movement with a realistic chance at federal political influence. Through 1919 and 1920, several federal by-elections were won by "United Farmers" candidates.

In June 1919, Thomas Crerar, Minister of Agriculture in the Unionist government of Robert Borden, quit the Borden cabinet because Minister of Finance Thomas White introduced a budget that failed to sufficiently reduce the tariff. Saskatchewan farmer leader and independent MP John Archibald Maharg withdrew his support from the government and joined Crerar, as did eight other Unionist MPs from the west. This loosely-organized caucus proved to be the beginnings of the Progressive Party.

Owing to the movement's outgrowth from a variety of provincial farmers' organizations, agrarian leaders were divided on an appropriate federal political strategy. Henry Wise Wood, president of the United Farmers of Alberta, opposed turning the farmers' political movement into a formal Third Party. His political experience in the U.S., where he had seen the collapse of the Populists in the 1890s, led him to fear that the internal friction caused by becoming an actual political party might lead to the destruction of the farmers movement. Wood argued the Canadian farmers' movement should remain a grassroots democratic organization, or "economic solidarity group". Philosophically, he advocated for co-operative democracy against the autocratic and corrupting tendencies of competitive party politics. Wood's theory of group government (akin to proportional representation) was considered revolutionary at the time, with some critics accusing his occupation-based electoral system as introducing "Sovietism" to Westminster responsible government.

The struggle between Wood's "group government" faction and agrarian leaders, including Crerar (who advocated a more traditional party-centric approach to federal politics), troubled the party throughout its existence. In their first formal caucus meeting on March 3, 1920, Crerar and eleven allied MPs established the National Progressive Party of Canada with Crerar as its first leader. Michael Clark mentioned the name of the party two days later in the House of Commons. Nevertheless, Crerar did not secure support among members of the Canadian Council of Agriculture for the establishment of a formal party structure. Thus, the party had no formal national organization, and the Canadian Council of Agriculture provided what structure it did have. Crerar formally served as parliamentary leader of the Progressives until the provincial organizations accepted his endorsement as national leader by the Canadian Council of Agriculture in 1921.

In the 1921 general election, the new party won 58 of the 235 seats in the House of Commons. Owing to the anti-party character of the Progressives, individual candidates' campaigns were strictly independent of the national organization, and no financial, organizational, or strategic support was provided under a policy of "constituency autonomy". Support for reforming the National Policy was a common denominator, but even this was not universal within the party. Given the autonomy of individual members and lack of formal party organization, some argue that the Progressives are better termed a "movement" rather than a party.

== Elected to office ==
The Progressive Party is commonly perceived as a western protest party, but in fact in the 1921 election, more Progressive MPs were elected in Ontario, which had a provincial farmers' government (the United Farmers of Ontario) than in Alberta. The party had strong support among Alberta voters, and won almost all the Alberta seats. But in number these were few when compared to the number of seats in Ontario.

All the Alberta MPs elected in 1921 were either United Farmers of Alberta candidates who were allied to the Progressives (and included in the Progressive total recorded above) or Labour; two were elected in Calgary. No Conservatives or Liberals were elected in that province that election. Ten UFA MPs were elected, while the other two seats in the province were taken by Labour candidates. Alberta had elected a UFA government prior to the 1921 federal election.

The Progressives won 24 of the 81 seats in Commons from Ontario. However, some in the party viewed this as a disappointing result. Despite finishing second in the seat count, not enough Progressive and farmer MPs were elected to wield the balance of power against the Liberal minority government.

The Progressives received significant number of votes in the Maritime provinces, but obtained only one seat, in New Brunswick. In addition to their representation in Ontario, Manitoba and Alberta, farmers' parties were significant presences in Nova Scotia and New Brunswick, but this failed to translate into seats in the House of Commons. The party also got five seats in British Columbia.

The Progressives were divided over what to do following the 1921 election. A significant group of ex-Liberals, including Crerar, supported forming a coalition government with the Liberals. This was resisted by Montreal interests in the Liberal Party and also by radical Progressives, including the UFA MPs and Agnes MacPhail of the United Farmers of Ontario. Others in the movement wanted a strong unified independent political party. Followers of Wood wished the party to remain a decentralized party with each individual member simply representing his constituents, supporting the Liberal government when what it did was right and opposing it when what it did was wrong.

The Progressives/Farmers refused the position of Official Opposition, normally accorded to the party with the second-largest number of seats. This was passed on to the third-largest party, the Conservative Party.

== Demise ==
Crerar attempted to introduce certain attributes of a standard party to the Progressives, including Parliamentary Whips and a national party organization. These efforts were resisted, however, and in 1922, Crerar resigned as leader. He was replaced by Robert Forke, another ex-Liberal who agreed with Crerar on most issues. The Progressives proved unsuccessful in Parliament and lost much of their moderate support in eastern Canada. While in the 1921 election Crerar had toured across the country, Forke abandoned everything east of Manitoba.

As well, the UFA MPs, other farmer MPs and the three Labour MPs in the House of Commons (J. S. Woodsworth, William Irvine and Joseph Shaw) joined together in the Ginger Group, breaking from Forke's leadership.

In the 1925 election, the Progressives lost almost all of their Ontario members. However, the party was still moderately successful in the west; they held many of their seats in Alberta.

This left the party dominated by the radical United Farmers of Alberta MPs. Forke resigned as Progressive house leader on June 30, 1926, one day after Mackenzie King resigned as Prime Minister. Forke and most of the Manitoba Progressives made a deal with the Liberal Party and ran as Liberal-Progressives in the 1926 election prompted by the fall of the interim Conservative government of Arthur Meighen. The Liberals formed a stable minority government following the 1926 election with the support of the eight elected Liberal-Progressive MPs. Forke entered the Mackenzie King cabinet as Minister of Immigration and Colonization.

The Alberta UFA MPs dropped the Progressive label. Identifying themselves as parliamentary representatives of the United Farmers of Alberta, 11 UFA MPs were elected in the 1926 election and nine in 1930 – most of whom were members of the radical Ginger Group faction of left wing Progressive, Labour and United Farmer MPs. Most sitting UFA MPs joined the Co-operative Commonwealth Federation party, and all the UFA MPs were defeated at the polls in the election of 1935 by the Social Credit Party of Canada political landslide.

In addition to Alberta electing nine UFA MPs in 1930, three MPs were elected as Progressives in the 1930 election. The three include Milton Neil Campbell and Archibald M. Carmichael of Saskatchewan and Agnes Macphail of Ontario (who was known as a proponent of the United Farmers of Ontario). Macphail successfully ran for re-election as a United Farmers of Ontario–Labour candidate in the 1935 election. However, she was defeated running under the same banner in 1940.

== Legacy ==
After the collapse of the party, most Progressive voters returned to the Liberal Party. The Liberals had always viewed the Progressives as simply "Liberals in a hurry"; for a large group of the party's supporters, this was true. The most important example of this return to the Liberals is T. A. Crerar, who served with the Liberals for decades, first as a cabinet minister and then as a Senator.

The more radical of the progressives split two ways. The Ginger Group was a faction formed in 1924 by radical Progressives; they were later joined by several Labour and independent MPs. They would eventually form the Co-operative Commonwealth Federation (the forerunner of the modern New Democratic Party).

Others, especially the radical populists, would later turn towards Social Credit ideology. This drew a definite line of western protest that continued to run through the Reform Party of Canada to the present day Conservative Party of Canada. The CCF and Social Credit had their roots in the United Farmers movement, from which a large number of MLAs were elected in New Brunswick, Nova Scotia and Manitoba, and which formed governments in Alberta, Ontario and Manitoba. In Manitoba, the United Farmers of Manitoba changed their name to the Progressive Party of Manitoba after coming to power in 1922.

The Conservative Party received the least of the Progressive's spoils, inheriting little more than the name, in 1942. Its first leader after amalgamation was John Bracken, who was then serving as the Progressive Premier of Manitoba.

More important than these effects on individual parties, the Progressive Party also had a great effect on Canada's governmental system; it was the most successful early example of a third party in Canada. Despite Duverger's law of political science, the Canadian Parliament has always had a third (and sometimes a fourth or even fifth as minority parties) party present ever since; however, Duverger's law states there will be two majority parties. The Progressives thus served both as a model and a cautionary tale for those that followed after.

== Party leaders ==
- Thomas Crerar 1920–1922
- Robert Forke 1922–1926

== Election results ==
Election	Party leader	No. of candidates nominated	No. of seats won	No. of total votes	No. of popular vote
1921	Thomas Crerar	137	58	658,976	21.09%
1925	Robert Forke	68	22	266,319	8.45%
1926		28	11	128,060	3.93%
1930		15	3	70,822	1.82%

The above table does not include MPs elected as United Farmers, Labour, Independent, Independent Progressive or other designations who may have been part of the Progressive Party caucus. (See United Farmers of Alberta.)

Progressive MP Agnes Macphail was re-elected in the 1935 federal election as a United Farmers of Ontario–Labour candidate. However, she was defeated running under the same banner in the 1940 federal election.

=== Combined Progressive/United Farmer/Labour results ===
==== 1921 ====
Party	Party leader	# of candidates	Seats			Popular vote		
Party	Party leader	# of candidates	1917	Elected	% Change	#	%	pp Change
Progressive	T. A. Crerar	137	*	58	*	658,976	21.09%	*
Labour	J. S. Woodsworth	28	-	3		85,388	2.73%	+0.90
United Farmers of Alberta		2	*	2	*	22,251	0.71%	*
United Farmers of Ontario		1	*	1	*	3,919	0.13%	*
Independent Progressive		1	*	1	*	3,309	0.115%	*
Socialist		1	*	-	*	3,094	0.10%	*
Total		170	-	65	-	776,397	24.875%	
Sources: http://www.elections.ca -- History of Federal Ridings since 1867

==== 1925 ====
Party	Party leader	# of candidates	Seats			Popular vote		
Party	Party leader	# of candidates	1921	Elected	% Change	#	%	pp Change
Progressive	Robert Forke	68	58	22	−62.1%	266,319	8.45%	−12.65
Labour	J. S. Woodsworth	20	3	2	−33.3%	56,987	1.81%	−0.93
United Farmers of Alberta		2	2	2	-	8,053	0.26%	−0.46
Labour-Farmer		2	*	-	*	4,774	0.15%	*
Independent Labour		1	*	-	*	2,901	0.09%	*
Socialist		1	-	-	-	1,888	0.06%	−0.04
Independent Progressive		1	1	-	−100%	1,768	0.06%	−0.05
Farmer		1	*	-	*	1,130	0.04%	*
Farmer–Labour		1	*	-	*	762	0.02%	*
United Farmers of Ontario		-	1**	-	-			
Total		97	65	26	-	304,582	10.94%	
Sources: http://www.elections.ca -- History of Federal Ridings since 1867

Notes:

* not applicable – the party was not recognized in the previous election

**Robert Henry Halbert was elected as UFO in 1921, ran for re-election as a Progressive in 1925 but was defeated.

==== 1926 ====
Party	Party leader	# of candidates	Seats			Popular vote		
Party	Party leader	# of candidates	1925	Elected	% Change	#	%	pp Change
Progressive		28	22	11	−50.0%	128,060	3.93%	−4.52
United Farmers of Alberta		12	2	11	+450%	60,740	1.87%	+1.61
Labour		18	2	4	+100%	55,661	1.71%	−0.10
United Farmers of Ontario		1	*	1	*	6,909	0.21%	*
Labour-Farmer		1	-	-	-	1,441	0.04%	−0.11
Socialist		1	-	-	-	672	0.02%	−0.04
Total		61	26	26	-	253,483	7.78%	
Sources: http://www.elections.ca -- History of Federal Ridings since 1867

Notes:

* not applicable – the party was not recognized in the previous election

x – less than 0.005% of the popular vote

==== 1930 ====
Party	Party leader	# of candidates	Seats			Popular vote		
Party	Party leader	# of candidates	1926	Elected	% Change	#	%	pp Change
United Farmers of Alberta		10	11	9	−18.2%	56,968	1.46%	−0.55
Progressive		15	11	3	−72.7%	70,822	1.82%	−2.41
Labour	J. S. Woodsworth	8	4	2	−50.0%	26,548	0.68%	−0.95
Independent Labour		2	*	1	*	15,988	0.41%	*
Farmer		5	*	-	*	11,999	0.31%	*
Labour-Farmer		2	-	-	-	3,276	0.08%	+0.04
Farmer-Labour		1	*	-	*	2,091	0.05%	*
Independent Progressive		1	*	-	*	1,294	0.03%	*
United Farmers of Ontario		-	1**		*			*
Total		44	26	15	-	188,926	4.84%	
Sources: http://www.elections.ca -- History of Federal Ridings since 1867

Note:

* The party did not nominate candidates in the previous election.

** Beniah Bowman was elected as a UFO MP in 1926 and ran for re-election as a Liberal in 1930 and was defeated.

==== 1935 ====
Party	Party leader	# of candidates	Seats			Popular vote		
Party	Party leader	# of candidates	1930	Elected	% Change	#	%	pp Change
United Farmers of Ontario–Labour		1	-	1**		7,210	0.39%	+0.16
Labour		5	2***	-	−100%	14,423	0.33%	−0.35
Socialist		1	*	-	*	251	0.01%	*
Independent Labour		1	1***	-	-	221	0.01%	−0.41
United Farmers of Alberta		-	9****	-	-			
Progressive		-	3*****	-	-			
Total		8	15	1	-	22,105	0.74%	
Sources: http://www.elections.ca -- History of Federal Ridings since 1867

Notes:

* The party did not nominate candidates in the previous election.

** Progressive MP Agnes Macphail ran for re-election as a UFO-Labour candidate in 1930 and was successful.

*** The three Labour and Independent Labour MPs, J. S. Woodsworth, Abraham Albert Heaps and Angus MacInnis successfully ran for re-election as Co-operative Commonwealth Federation candidates. A fourth Labour MP, Humphrey Mitchell, who entered parliament in a 1931 by-election refused to join the CCF and ran for re-election as a Labour candidate but was defeated. He later joined the Liberals.

**** Of the 9 United Farmers of Alberta MPs, 8 ran for re-election as CCFers and were defeated, the ninth ran as a Conservative and was also defeated.

***** Of the 3 Progressive MPs elected in 1930, one, Agnes Macphail, ran in 1935 as a UFO-Labour candidate and was re-elected, a second, Milton Neil Campbell, resigned in 1933 to become vice-chairman of the Tariff Board of Canada and was succeeded in a by-election by a Liberal, and the third, Archibald M. Carmichael, did not seek re-election in 1935

x – less than 0.005% of the popular vote

== Historiography ==
The study of the Progressive Party is almost wholly dominated by one author, W. L. Morton, whose 1950 book, The Progressive Party in Canada, won a Governor General's Award, and had been the principal text on the Progressive Party ever since. A great number of more recently published works on western politics cite only Morton's book in their discussion of the Progressive Party. Morton, a Red Tory, wrote in the context of a seemingly spreading Social Credit movement. Morton's book was the first in a series exploring the origins of the Social Credit movement.

== Provincial parties ==
=== Newfoundland ===
Though not part of the United Farmers movement, or indeed a movement of farmers at all, the Fisherman's Protective Union of Newfoundland provides an interesting case that parallels that of the United Farmers. However Newfoundland was not part of Canada until 1949.

=== Nova Scotia ===
The United Farmers of Nova Scotia was formed in January 1920 at meetings that followed the annual convention of the Nova Scotia Farmers' Association. At an April meeting, 300 farmers approved the UFNA's constitution and the publication of a newspaper, United Farmer's Guide. The movement nominated 16 candidates and elected 7 in the 1920 general election. Aligning with the Independent Labour Party they formed the official opposition with 11 MLAs (elected with a 30.9% of the popular vote). Daniel G. McKenzie, a successful farmer and former school-teacher from Malagash, was appointed party and opposition leader.

The party began to lose its momentum in the fall when one of its founders, Major Hugh Dickson, was defeated in the Colchester by-election. In 1921, Nova Scotia Liberal Party Premier George Henry Murray discredited the party in the eyes of the public when he offered to divide the government's budget surplus among members of the legislature. All but one United Farmer MLA accepted Murray's largesse. Later that session another scandal rocked the party when it was revealed that MacKenzie had secretly accepted a government salary of $500. A series of defections followed and by 1925 the United Farmers of Nova Scotia had virtually ceased to exist.

=== New Brunswick ===
The 1920 provincial election elected nine United Farmers and two Farmer-Labour MLAs who sat together and allowed the incumbent Liberals to maintain confidence in a minority government situation. None of them were re-elected in the 1925 election and no other UF candidates were elected at subsequent elections.

=== Ontario ===
In Ontario, the United Farmers of Ontario formed government as a result of the 1919 provincial election with E. C. Drury as Premier. After the government's defeat in 1923 and the formal decision of the UFO to withdraw from electoral politics, most remaining UFO Members of the Legislative Assembly (MLAs) took to calling themselves "Progressives". In the 1934 provincial election the remaining Progressive MLAs under Harry Nixon ran as Liberal-Progressives in an alliance with the Ontario Liberal Party led by former UFO member Mitch Hepburn. The Liberal-Progressives subsequently joined the Liberal Party.

=== Manitoba ===
The Progressive Party of Manitoba had merged with the Manitoba Liberal Party in the 1920s to form a Liberal-Progressive party there. Despite this, in 1942, Manitoba Premier John Bracken, a Progressive, was persuaded to become the leader of the national Conservative Party. As a condition of his accepting the leadership, the party's name was changed to Progressive Conservative Party of Canada. The Progressive Party of Canada, however, refused to disband, and ran its own candidates in the subsequent federal election against Bracken's Tories. The party's electoral fortunes continued to decline, and most Progressives ended up joining either the Liberal Party or the Co-operative Commonwealth Federation (CCF), rather than the renamed Progressive Conservatives.

=== Saskatchewan ===
The Progressive Party of Saskatchewan ran seven candidates and elected six members to the Saskatchewan legislature in the 1921 general election despite the absence of a provincial organization due to the reluctance of the Saskatchewan Grain Growers' Association to break with the Saskatchewan Liberal Party. The Liberals had a tradition of consulting the SGGA about farm policy and of appointing prominent farm activists to cabinet such as Charles Dunning and John Maharg. A political crisis ensued the Liberal government in late 1921 in which Premier William Melville Martin angered the SGGA by campaigning for the federal Liberal Party of Canada against the Progressive Party of Canada in the 1921 federal election. Agriculture Minister Maharg, a former SGGA president, resigned from the Cabinet in protest and crossed the floor to sit as an independent and become Leader of the Opposition. Martin himself was forced to step down and the federal Progressives won 15 of 16 Saskatchewan seats in the federal election. The SGGA subsequently authorized the creation of local political action committees across the province but were unable to build on the 1921 federal breakthrough and only ran 6 of a possible 63 candidates in the next two provincial elections. In the 1925 provincial election the Progressives again won six seats and formed the official opposition. They were reduced to third party status and five seats in the 1929 provincial election with the Liberals reduced to minority government status due to a strong showing by a revived Conservative Party of Saskatchewan. The Progressives joined with the Conservatives to force the Liberals from office on September 6, 1929 and formed a coalition government allowing the Conservatives leader James T. M. Anderson to take power as premier; one Progressive, Reginald Stipe, was appointed to Anderson's cabinet as minister without portfolio. By the next election the Progressives had disappeared.

While the Progressives moved to the right, more radical farmers gravitated to the United Farmers of Canada (Saskatchewan Section) which was formed in 1926 by members of the Farmers' Union of Canada and the Saskatchewan Grain Growers' Association. As a result of the Dust Bowl farm crisis during the Great Depression the UFC (SS) became politicised and adopted a socialist platform. In 1930, in response to the Progressive-Conservative coalition, the UFC (SS) under the leadership of George Hara Williams decided to form a new political party. In 1932 it joined with the Independent Labour Party in the province to form the Farmer-Labour Group. Progressive MLA Jacob Benson joined the new party to become its first MLA. In the 1934 provincial election, the FLG returned five MLAs to the legislature and subsequently became the Saskatchewan section of the Cooperative Commonwealth Federation.

=== Alberta ===
The United Farmers of Alberta formed was the governing party in Alberta from 1921 until its defeat in 1935. It also elected a number of MPs to the House of Commons of Canada who sat initially as Progressive Party MPs but were re-elected as UFA MPs beginning in 1926 due to a split in the Progressive movement.

== See also ==
- List of Progressive/United Farmer MPs
- United Farmers
- United Farmers of Quebec
- Fisherman's Protective Union a similar movement in Newfoundland
- Labour Party
- Non-Partisan League
- Co-operative Commonwealth Federation
- New Democratic Party
- List of political parties in Canada
- Farmers' movement
