= Labrador (electoral district) =

Federal electoral district in Newfoundland and Labrador, Canada

Coordinates: 54.1187°N 61.1353°W

Newfoundland and Labrador electoral district
- Interactive map of riding boundaries from the 1988 federal election

Federal electoral district
- Legislature: House of Commons
MP
Philip Earle
Liberal
- District created: 1949
- First contested: 1949
- Last contested: 2025
- District webpage: profile, map

Demographics
- Population (2021): 26,655
- Electors (2025): 19,893
- Area (km²): 294,330
- Pop. density (per km²): 0.09
- Census division(s): Division No. 10, Division No. 11
- Census subdivision(s): Cartwright, Charlottetown, Division No. 10, Subdivision A, Division No. 10, Subdivision B, Division No. 10, Subdivision C, Division No. 10, Subdivision D, Division No. 10, Subdivision E, Division No. 11, Subdivision C, Division No. 11, Subdivision E, Forteau, Happy Valley-Goose Bay, Hopedale, Labrador City, L'Anse-au-Clair, L'Anse-au-Loup, Makkovik, Mary's Harbour, Nain, Natuashish, North West River, Pinware, Port Hope Simpson, Postville, Red Bay, Rigolet, Sheshatshiu, St. Lewis, Wabush, West St. Modeste

Labrador (formerly known as Grand Falls—White Bay—Labrador and Grand Falls—White Bay) is a federal electoral district in Newfoundland and Labrador, Canada, that has been represented in the House of Commons of Canada since 1949.

The riding covers all of Labrador and, with just 26,000 people located in the riding, it is the least populous in Canada. From 2005 to 2011, the riding was represented by Liberal MP Todd Russell. He was defeated by Conservative Peter Penashue in the 2011 federal election. Following allegations of irregularities in his campaign spending, Penashue announced on March 14, 2013, that he would resign his seat and run again as a candidate in a new by-election. Penashue subsequently lost the by-election to Liberal candidate Yvonne Jones. Jones was re-elected in the 2015, 2019, and 2021 federal elections. Jones declined to seek re-election 2025 and was succeeded by fellow Liberal Party member Philip Earle. The riding is viewed as a Liberal stronghold.

The riding contains a large indigenous population, including the Inuit self-governing territory of Nunatsiavut, as well as two Innu reserves Sheshatshiu and Natuashish. The Voisey's Bay nickel mine, near Nain, is also in the riding.

All six indigenous communities on the North Coast are inaccessible by road and may be reached only by air or sea.

== Demographics ==
This riding is the least populous in Canada. Citing the region's highly distinct identity and seeing it as a community of interest they have the legal duty to respect, successive electoral boundary commissions have used their ability to make exceptions to the general electoral quotient to maintain Labrador as a separate riding.

In earlier representation orders, it was joined with communities on the Great Northern Peninsula of the island of Newfoundland.

Ethnic groups: 65.1% White, 34.9% Native Canadian
Languages (2016): 86.4% English, 5.6% Innu, 2.3% Naskapi, 1.5% French, 1.4% Inuktitut, 1.3% Tagalog, 0.1% German, 0.1% Panjabi, 0.1% Spanish
Religions: 67.4% Protestant, 28.4% Catholic, 3.4% No affiliation
Average income: $27 138

== Geography ==
The district, as defined by Elections Canada since 2006, includes all of Labrador, including Belle Isle, North and South Aulatsivik Island.

The neighbouring ridings are Nunavut, Abitibi—Baie-James—Nunavik—Eeyou, Côte-Nord—Kawawachikamach—Nitassinan, and Long Range Mountains.

The 2012 federal electoral boundaries redistribution concluded that the electoral boundaries of Labrador should be preserved with no boundary changes for future elections.

See the map of the Labrador riding.

== History ==
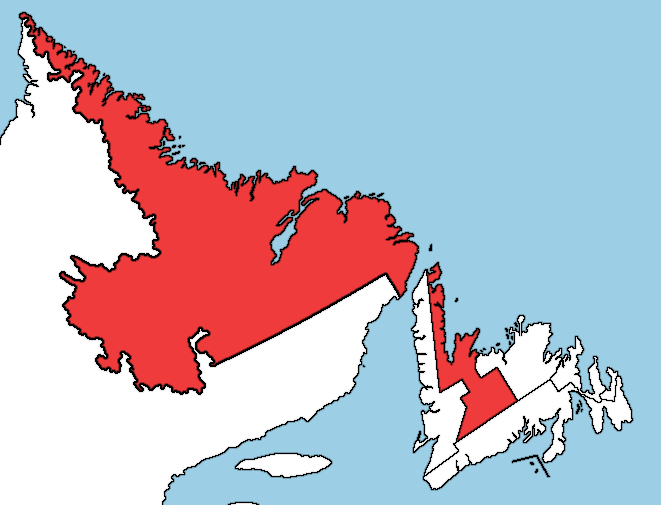
The old riding of Grand Falls—White Bay—Labrador in the 1966 representation order

The electoral district was created in 1949 upon the admission of Newfoundland to Canada. Between 1949 and 1988, this district was attached to the Island of Newfoundland, where more than half of its electorate resided. Liberal MP Bill Rompkey held the seat from 1972 until his appointment to the Senate of Canada in 1995. Lawrence D. O'Brien was later elected in a by-election and held the district until his death in 2004.

A by-election was held on May 24, 2005, with the result tipping the balance of the evenly split 38th Parliament. The Liberal candidate, Todd Russell, who was heavily favoured, ended up winning, but with a reduced percentage from the 2004 election.

On December 16, 2004, MP Lawrence O'Brien died of cancer, the next year Prime Minister Paul Martin called a by-election for May 24, 2005. There was a possibility the by-election would not be held because of a non-confidence vote the week prior. The non-confidence vote would have toppled the government sending Canadians to the polls, which would have superseded the by-election. However, the motion failed by one vote, ensuring the by-election.

The seat has traditionally been a Liberal stronghold, and O'Brien always carried the riding with comfortable pluralities. However, the federal Liberals had lost popularity in Atlantic Canada since the 2004 federal election largely because of disputes with the Progressive Conservative provincial governments of these provinces, especially that of Newfoundland and Labrador over the relationship between offshore oil revenues and equalization payments.

Historically, governing parties fare poorly in federal by-elections. However, this by-election was especially significant because of the make-up of the 38th Canadian Parliament. Following the 2004 election, the Liberals and the New Democratic Party held 154 seats together, or exactly half of the 308-seat House of Commons. After Liberal MP Carolyn Parrish was expelled from that party, the two parties' combined total (prior to O'Brien's death) had been reduced to 153 (or 152 who are eligible to vote since the Speaker was elected as a Liberal). The Liberals were anxious to retain the seat, as its loss would have left the opposition Conservative Party of Canada or the Bloc Québécois as the only viable partners for the Liberals to get legislation passed in the House. Former Liberal MP David Kilgour had left the party, further reducing its strength.

Since the general election, it had been suggested that the New Democratic Party refrain from contesting by-elections in seats where the Liberals were strong but the NDP are not, to avoid splitting the vote and thus help improve the chances securing a better position for the NDP in the House. Labrador would certainly be a prime example of such a seat — the NDP finished a distant fourth in the 2004 election. However, historically the NDP has been adamant in contesting all by-elections, and NDP leader Jack Layton showed little interest in any such proposal. The NDP nominated Frances Fry on April 23 feeling it had a chance in this seat because of the Liberal fall in polls and the fact that the provincial NDP had one of its two seats in Labrador.

In the end, the Liberals picked up an easy victory, as expected, but while their actual vote total did not go down by much, their percentage of the vote went down over 10 points from the previous election as turnout was over 9% more than in the 2004 election. This high turnout is virtually unheard of for by-elections which normally have extremely poor turnouts. The additional voters appear to have been brought out by the tense national political situation and mostly voted for the Conservatives who picked up nearly 17 percentage points and the New Democrats who also increased their vote total.

=== Members of Parliament ===
This riding has elected the following members of Parliament:

Parliament	Years	Member	Party
Grand Falls—White Bay
21st	1949–1953	Thomas Gordon William Ashbourne	Liberal
Grand Falls—White Bay—Labrador
22nd	1953–1957	Thomas Gordon William Ashbourne	Liberal
23rd	1957–1958	Thomas Gordon William Ashbourne	Liberal
24th	1958–1962	Charles Granger	Liberal
25th	1962–1963	Charles Granger	Liberal
26th	1963–1965	Charles Granger	Liberal
27th	1965–1966	Charles Granger	Liberal
27th	1966–1968	Andrew Chatwood	Liberal
28th	1968–1972	Ambrose Peddle	Progressive Conservative
29th	1972–1974	Bill Rompkey	Liberal
30th	1974–1979	Bill Rompkey	Liberal
31st	1979–1980	Bill Rompkey	Liberal
32nd	1980–1984	Bill Rompkey	Liberal
33rd	1984–1988	Bill Rompkey	Liberal
Labrador
34th	1988–1993	Bill Rompkey	Liberal
35th	1993–1996	Bill Rompkey	Liberal
35th	1996–1997	Lawrence D. O'Brien	Liberal
36th	1997–2000	Lawrence D. O'Brien	Liberal
37th	2000–2004	Lawrence D. O'Brien	Liberal
38th	2004–2004	Lawrence D. O'Brien	Liberal
38th	2005–2006	Todd Russell	Liberal
39th	2006–2008	Todd Russell	Liberal
40th	2008–2011	Todd Russell	Liberal
41st	2011–2013	Peter Penashue	Conservative
41st	2013–2015	Yvonne Jones	Liberal
42nd	2015–2019	Yvonne Jones	Liberal
43rd	2019–2021	Yvonne Jones	Liberal
44th	2021–2025	Yvonne Jones	Liberal
45th	2025–present	Philip Earle	Liberal

== Election results ==
Graph of election results in Grand Falls—White Bay, Grand Falls—White Bay—Labrador, Labrador (minor parties that never got 2% of the vote or didn't run consistently are omitted) View source data.

=== Labrador ===
Graph of election results in Labrador (minor parties that never got 2% of the vote or didn't run consistently are omitted) View source data.

==== 2025 ====
2025 Canadian federal election
Party	Candidate	Votes	%	±%	Expenditures
Liberal	Philip Earle	5,811	51.50	+8.83	$70,409.30
Conservative	Ella Wallace	4,709	41.73	+11.38	$58,728.20
New Democratic	Marius Normore	764	6.77	−17.03	$5,023.73
Total valid votes/expense limit		11,284	98.53	+0.51	$128,378.11
Total rejected ballots		168	1.47	-0.51	
Turnout		11,452	57.18	+9.02	
Eligible voters		20,027			
Liberal hold		Swing		−1.28	
Source: Elections Canada

2021 results by polling area

==== 2021 ====
2021 Canadian federal election
Party	Candidate	Votes	%	±%	Expenditures
Liberal	Yvonne Jones	4,119	42.67	+0.19	$69,064.75
Conservative	Shane Dumaresque	2,930	30.35	-0.72	$9,399.17
New Democratic	Amy Norman	2,297	23.80	-0.69	$4,902.92
People's	Shannon Champion	307	3.18	–	none listed
Total valid votes/expense limit		9,653	99.04		$107,802.67
Total rejected ballots		94	0.96	-0.24	
Turnout		9,747	48.16	-9.10	
Registered voters		20,239			
Liberal hold		Swing		+0.45	
Source: Elections Canada

==== 2019 ====
2019 Canadian federal election
Party	Candidate	Votes	%	±%	Expenditures
Liberal	Yvonne Jones	4,851	42.48	-29.27	$82,443.39
Conservative	Larry Flemming	3,548	31.07	+17.20	$19,580.39
New Democratic	Michelene Gray	2,796	24.49	+10.11	$2,811.15
Green	Tyler Colbourne	224	1.96	–	$0.00
Total valid votes/expense limit		11,419	98.80	-0.77	104,476.76
Total rejected ballots		139	1.20	-0.78	
Turnout		11,558	57.26	-4.73	
Eligible voters		20,184			
Liberal hold		Swing		-23.24	
Source: Elections Canada

==== 2015 ====
2015 Canadian federal election
Party	Candidate	Votes	%	±%	Expenditures
Liberal	Yvonne Jones	8,878	71.75	+23.76	$95,326.13
New Democratic	Edward Rudkowski	1,779	14.38	–4.81	$47,898.82
Conservative	Peter Penashue	1,716	13.87	–18.53	$24,186.27
Total valid votes/expense limit		12,373	99.57		$204,663.38
Total rejected ballots		53	0.43	–0.42	
Turnout		12,426	61.99	+4.00	
Eligible voters		20,045			
Liberal hold		Swing		+14.29	
Source: Elections Canada

==== 2013 by-election ====
Canadian federal by-election, 13 May 2013 Resignation of Peter Penashue, 14 March 2013
Party	Candidate	Votes	%	±%	Expenditures
Liberal	Yvonne Jones	5,812	47.99	+8.92	$76,859.63
Conservative	Peter Penashue	3,924	32.40	−7.41	$70,866.91
New Democratic	Harry Borlase	2,324	19.19	−0.64	$81,475.53
Libertarian	Norman Andrews	50	0.41		$236.16
Total valid votes/expense limit		12,110	100.0	–	$ 89,852.84
Total rejected, declined and unmarked ballots		27	0.22	−0.26	
Turnout		12,137	59.93	+6.49	
Eligible voters		20,251			
Liberal gain from Conservative		Swing		+8.17	
Source: "By-election May 13, 2013". Elections Canada. May 13, 2013.

==== 2011 ====
2011 Canadian federal election
Party	Candidate	Votes	%	±%	Expenditures
Conservative	Peter Penashue	4,256	39.81	+31.84	$89,997.05
Liberal	Todd Russell	4,177	39.07	−31.21	$30,016.49
New Democratic	Jacob Larkin	2,120	19.83	+1.98	$29,968.41
Green	George C.R. Barrett	139	1.30	−2.61	$0.00
Total valid votes/expense limit		10,692	100.0	–	$84,468.09
Total rejected, declined and unmarked ballots		52	0.48	−0.37	
Turnout		10,744	52.91	+14.31	
Eligible voters		20,305			
Conservative gain from Liberal		Swing		+31.52	
Conservative candidate Peter Penashue was found to have spent above the mandated expense limit, precipitating his resignation and subsequent by-election.

==== 2008 ====
2008 Canadian federal election
Party	Candidate	Votes	%	±%	Expenditures
Liberal	Todd Russell	5,426	70.28	+19.75	$26,887
New Democratic	Phyllis Artiss	1,378	17.85	+8.77	$5,886
Conservative	Lacey Lewis	615	7.97	-31.70	$15,728
Green	Nyssa Christine McLeod	302	3.91	+3.19	none listed
Total valid votes/Expense limit		7,721	100.0	–	$81,667
Total rejected, declined and unmarked ballots		66	0.85	+0.40	
Turnout		7,787	38.60	-19.8	
Eligible voters		20,175			
Liberal hold		Swing		+5.49	

==== 2006 ====
2006 Canadian federal election
Party	Candidate	Votes	%	±%	Expenditures
Liberal	Todd Russell	5,768	50.53	-0.95	$40,903.10
Conservative	Joe Goudie	4,528	39.67	+7.34	$36,381.98
New Democratic	Jacob Edward Larkin	1,037	9.08	-0.81	$164.95
Green	Gail Zwicker	82	0.72	+0.08	none listed
Total valid votes/Expense limit		11,415	100.0	–	$75,653
Total rejected, declined and unmarked ballots		52	0.45	-0.10	
Turnout		11,467	57.99	+4.55	
Eligible voters		19,774			
Liberal hold		Swing		-4.14	
Changes are from the 2005 by-election

==== 2005 by-election ====
Canadian federal by-election, May 24, 2005 Death of Lawrence D. O'Brien, 16 December 2004
Party	Candidate	Votes	%	±%	Expenditures
Liberal	Todd Russell	5,438	51.48	-10.75	$53,970.30
Conservative	Graham Letto	3,415	32.33	+16.56	$73,509.62
New Democratic	Frances Fry	1,045	9.89	+0.25	$26,121.42
Independent	Ern Condon	598	5.66	-4.69	$254.00
Green	Jason Crummey	68	0.64	-1.37	$78.45
Total valid votes/Expense limit		10,564	100.0	–	$74,995
Total rejected, declined and unmarked ballots		58	0.55	+0.03	
Turnout		10,622	53.44	+8.62	
Eligible voters		19,876			
Liberal hold		Swing		-13.6	

==== 2004 ====
2004 Canadian federal election
Party	Candidate	Votes	%	±%	Expenditures
Liberal	Lawrence D. O'Brien	5,524	62.23	-6.76	$35,586.52
Conservative	Merrill Strachan	1,400	15.77	-2.85	$17,120.09
Independent	Ern Condon	919	10.35	–	$62.50
New Democratic	Shawn Crann	856	9.64	-2.74	none listed
Green	Lori-Ann Martino	178	2.01	–	$135.00
Total valid votes/Expense limit		8,877	100.0	–	$73,792
Total rejected, declined and unmarked ballots		46	0.52		
Turnout		8,923	44.82		
Eligible voters		19,909			
Liberal hold		Swing		-1.96	
Change for the Conservatives is based on the combined totals of the Progressive Conservatives and the Canadian Alliance.

==== 2000 ====
2000 Canadian federal election
Party	Candidate	Votes	%	±%
Liberal	Lawrence D. O'Brien	7,153	68.99	+18.37
New Democratic	Amanda Will	1,284	12.38	-25.41
Progressive Conservative	Hayward Broomfield	1,254	12.09	+5.20
Alliance	Eugene Burt	677	6.53	+1.84
Total valid votes		10,368	100.00	
Changes for the Canadian Alliance are based on the 1997 results of its predecessor, the Reform Party.

==== 1997 ====
1997 Canadian federal election
Party	Candidate	Votes	%	±%
Liberal	Lawrence D. O'Brien	6,182	50.62	+10.15
New Democratic	Randy Collins	4,615	37.79	+17.98
Progressive Conservative	Mike Patton	842	6.89	-1.81
Reform	Stephane Girardin	573	4.69	-25.69
Total valid votes		12,212	100.00	

==== 1996 by-election ====
Canadian federal by-election, 1996
Party	Candidate	Votes	%	±%
Liberal	Lawrence D. O'Brien	4,032	40.47	-36.64
Reform	John Michael McGrath	3,027	30.38	
New Democratic	Randy Collins	1,974	19.81	+15.89
Progressive Conservative	Darlene Gear-White	867	8.70	-10.27
Independent	Alain Roy	63	0.63	
Total valid votes		9,963	100.00	
Called on Bill Rompkey's appointment to the Senate.

==== 1993 ====
1993 Canadian federal election
Party	Candidate	Votes	%	±%
Liberal	Bill Rompkey	8,724	77.11	+23.61
Progressive Conservative	Wayne Piercey	2,146	18.97	-14.06
New Democratic	Barry Knight	444	3.92	-7.40
Total valid votes		11,314	100.00	

==== 1988 ====
1988 Canadian federal election
Party	Candidate	Votes	%	±%
Liberal	Bill Rompkey	7,126	53.50	+8.37
Progressive Conservative	Joseph Goudie	4,400	33.03	-9.23
New Democratic	Evelyn Riggs	1,508	11.32	-1.29
Independent	Ern Condon	286	2.15	
Total valid votes		13,320	100.00	

=== Grand Falls—White Bay—Labrador ===
Graph of election results in Grand Falls—White Bay—Labrador (minor parties that never got 2% of the vote or didn't run consistently are omitted) View source data.

==== 1984 ====
1984 Canadian federal election
Party	Candidate	Votes	%	±%
Liberal	Bill Rompkey	12,938	45.13	-7.54
Progressive Conservative	Peter J. Walsh	12,114	42.26	+17.25
New Democratic	Ern Condon	3,616	12.61	-9.71
Total valid votes		28,668	100.00	

==== 1980 ====
1980 Canadian federal election
Party	Candidate	Votes	%	±%
Liberal	Bill Rompkey	15,530	52.67	+6.58
Progressive Conservative	Ray Hawco	7,375	25.01	+13.46
New Democratic	Ern Condon	6,582	22.32	-20.05
Total valid votes		29,487	100.00	

==== 1979 ====
1979 Canadian federal election
Party	Candidate	Votes	%	±%
Liberal	Bill Rompkey	13,639	46.09	-8.73
New Democratic	Bryan Blackmore	12,538	42.37	+20.66
Progressive Conservative	Calvin Osmond	3,418	11.55	-11.92
Total valid votes		29,595	100.00	

==== 1974 ====
1974 Canadian federal election
Party	Candidate	Votes	%	±%
Liberal	Bill Rompkey	12,689	54.82	-2.82
Progressive Conservative	Jim Corp Janes	5,433	23.47	-12.74
New Democratic	Donald J. Head	5,026	21.71	+15.56
Total valid votes		23,148	100.00	

==== 1972 ====
1972 Canadian federal election
Party	Candidate	Votes	%	±%
Liberal	Bill Rompkey	14,274	57.64	+10.83
Progressive Conservative	Ambrose Peddle	8,968	36.21	-14.19
New Democratic	Earle R. Boone	1,523	6.15	+3.36
Total valid votes		24,765	100.00	

==== 1968 ====
1968 Canadian federal election
Party	Candidate	Votes	%	±%
Progressive Conservative	Ambrose Peddle	10,322	50.40	+31.57
Liberal	Andrew Chatwood	9,587	46.81	-26.23
New Democratic	Austin Scott	571	2.79	-5.34
Total valid votes		20,480	100.00	

==== 1966 by-election ====
Canadian federal by-election, 19 September 1966 Resignation of Charles Granger, 1 August 1966
Party	Candidate	Votes	%	±%
Liberal	Andrew Chatwood	9,754	73.04	+2.08
Progressive Conservative	Thomas Fenwick Pitcher	2,515	18.83	-4.04
New Democratic	Lorne Campbell Snell	1,086	8.13	
Total valid votes		13,355	100.00	

==== 1965 ====
1965 Canadian federal election
Party	Candidate	Votes	%	±%
Liberal	Charles Granger	17,933	70.96	+0.30
Progressive Conservative	Thomas Fenwick Pitcher	5,779	22.87	-2.50
Social Credit	Harold W. Parsons	1,560	6.17	
Total valid votes		25,272	100.00	

==== 1963 ====
1963 Canadian federal election
Party	Candidate	Votes	%	±%
Liberal	Charles Granger	18,233	70.66	+5.11
Progressive Conservative	Cyril C. Pelley	6,545	25.37	+1.16
New Democratic	Kitchener Pritchett	1,025	3.97	-6.27
Total valid votes		25,803	100.00	

==== 1962 ====
1962 Canadian federal election
Party	Candidate	Votes	%	±%
Liberal	Charles Granger	16,401	65.55	+3.83
Progressive Conservative	Wolfred Nelson	6,057	24.21	-14.07
New Democratic	William Joseph Gillies	2,561	10.24	
Total valid votes		25,019	100.00	

==== 1958 ====
1958 Canadian federal election
Party	Candidate	Votes	%	±%
Liberal	Charles Granger	16,328	61.72	-13.69
Progressive Conservative	David Gordon Decker	10,129	38.28	+13.69
Total valid votes		26,457	100.00	

==== 1957 ====
1957 Canadian federal election
Party	Candidate	Votes	%	±%
Liberal	Thomas Gordon William Ashbourne	11,681	75.41	+2.15
Progressive Conservative	George Bloomfield	3,810	24.59	-2.15
Total valid votes		15,491	100.00	

==== 1953 ====
1953 Canadian federal election
Party	Candidate	Votes	%	±%
Liberal	Thomas Gordon William Ashbourne	13,653	73.26	-13.49
Progressive Conservative	Henry George Hicks	4,984	26.74	+13.49
Total valid votes		18,637	100.00	

=== Grand Falls—White Bay ===
==== 1949 ====
1949 Canadian federal election
Party	Candidate	Votes	%
Liberal	Thomas Gordon William Ashbourne	12,301	86.75
Progressive Conservative	James Pond	1,879	13.25
Total valid votes		14,180	100.00

== Student vote results ==
=== 2025 ===
2025 Canadian federal election
Party	Candidate	Votes	%
Liberal	Philip Earle	363	47.51
Conservative	Ella Wallace	290	37.96
New Democratic	Marius Normore	111	14.53
Total votes		746	100
Source: Student Vote Canada

=== 2021 ===
2021 Canadian federal election
Party	Candidate	Votes	%
New Democratic	Amy Norman	111	46.25
Liberal	Yvone Jones	66	27.50
Conservative	Shane Dumaresque	50	20.83
People's	Shannon Champion	13	5.42
Total votes		240	100
Source: Student Vote Canada

=== 2019 ===
2019 Canadian federal election
Party	Candidate	Votes	%	±%
Liberal	Yvonne Jones	433	38.94	-28.61
New Democratic	Michelene Gray	355	31.92	+12.14
Conservative	Larry Flemming	209	18.79	+6.12
Green	Tyler Colbourne	105	10.34	–
Total Valid Votes		3,263	100.0	
Source: Student Vote Canada

=== 2015 ===
2015 Canadian federal election
Party	Candidate	Votes	%	±%
Liberal	Yvonne Jones	560	67.55	+20.09
New Democratic	Edward Rudkowski	164	19.78	+7.25
Conservative	Peter Penashue	105	12.67	-18.67
Total Valid Votes		829	100.0	
Source: Student Vote Canada

=== 2011 ===
2011 Canadian federal election
Party	Candidate	Votes	%
Liberal	Todd Russell	159	47.46
Conservative	Peter Penashue	105	31.34
New Democratic	Jacob Larkin	42	12.53
Green	George C.R. Barrett	29	8.65
Total Valid Votes		335	100.0
Source: Student Vote Canada

== See also ==
- List of Canadian electoral districts
- Historical federal electoral districts of Canada
