= L'Anse Amour =

Coordinates: 51°28′26.70″N 56°52′12.11″W

L'Anse Amour Anse aux Morts (Cove of the Dead)
- Hamlet
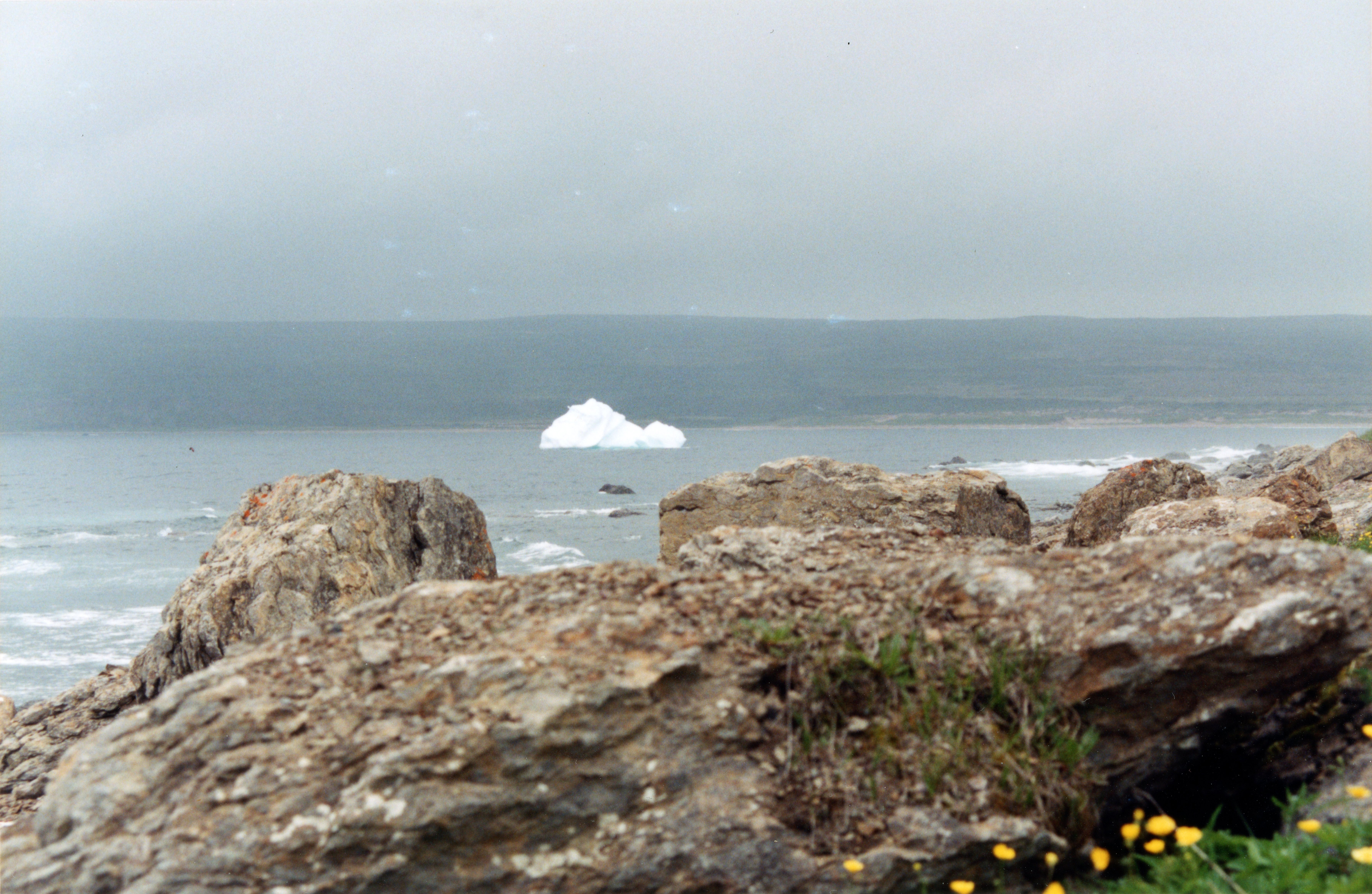
- Rocks, iceberg, Strait of Belle Isle
- Interactive map of L'Anse Amour
- Country: Canada
- Province: Newfoundland and Labrador
- Time zone: UTC-3:30 (Newfoundland Time)
  - Summer (DST): UTC-2:30 (Newfoundland Daylight)
- Area code: 709
- Highways: Route 510 (Trans-Labrador Highway)

L'Anse Amour (/ˈlænsəmɔːr/) (Cove of Love), romanticized version of Anse aux Morts (Cove of the Dead), is a hamlet located on the north shore of the Strait of Belle Isle, Newfoundland and Labrador, Canada.

As of 2006, it had a population of 8. The population of the village has not been officially counted since, though the total population of Subdivision 10A, which includes L'Anse Amour was 55 in 2021 (down from 61 in 2016). L'Anse Amour is located on Trans-Labrador Highway (Route 510).

== Demographics ==
The figures below pertain to Division No. 10, Subd. A, which includes L'Anse Amour.

- Population, 2021: 55
- Population, 2016: 61
- Population change, 2016-2021: -9.8 percent
- Area (square kilometers): 3,755.19

No statistics for the town of L'Anse Amour itself are available, though a tourist Web site lists the town's population at 8.

== History ==
Human activity in the area dates back at least 8,300 years. The oldest evidence for this is a burial mound of a Maritime Archaic boy. His body was wrapped in a shroud of bark or hide and placed face down with his head pointed to the west. A sign at the site describes the significance of the burial mound and reproductions of artifacts found there are located at the Labrador Straits Museum in L'Anse au Loup, Labrador. The burial mound site was designated a National Historic Site of Canada in 1978.

Burial mound

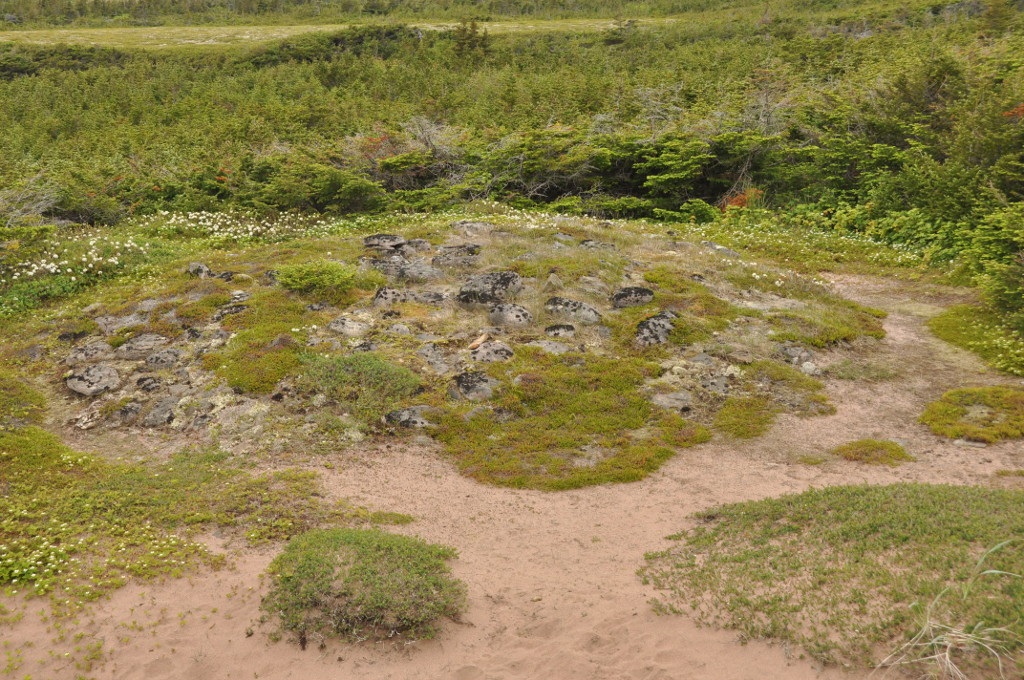
The prehistoric burial mound at L'Anse Amour

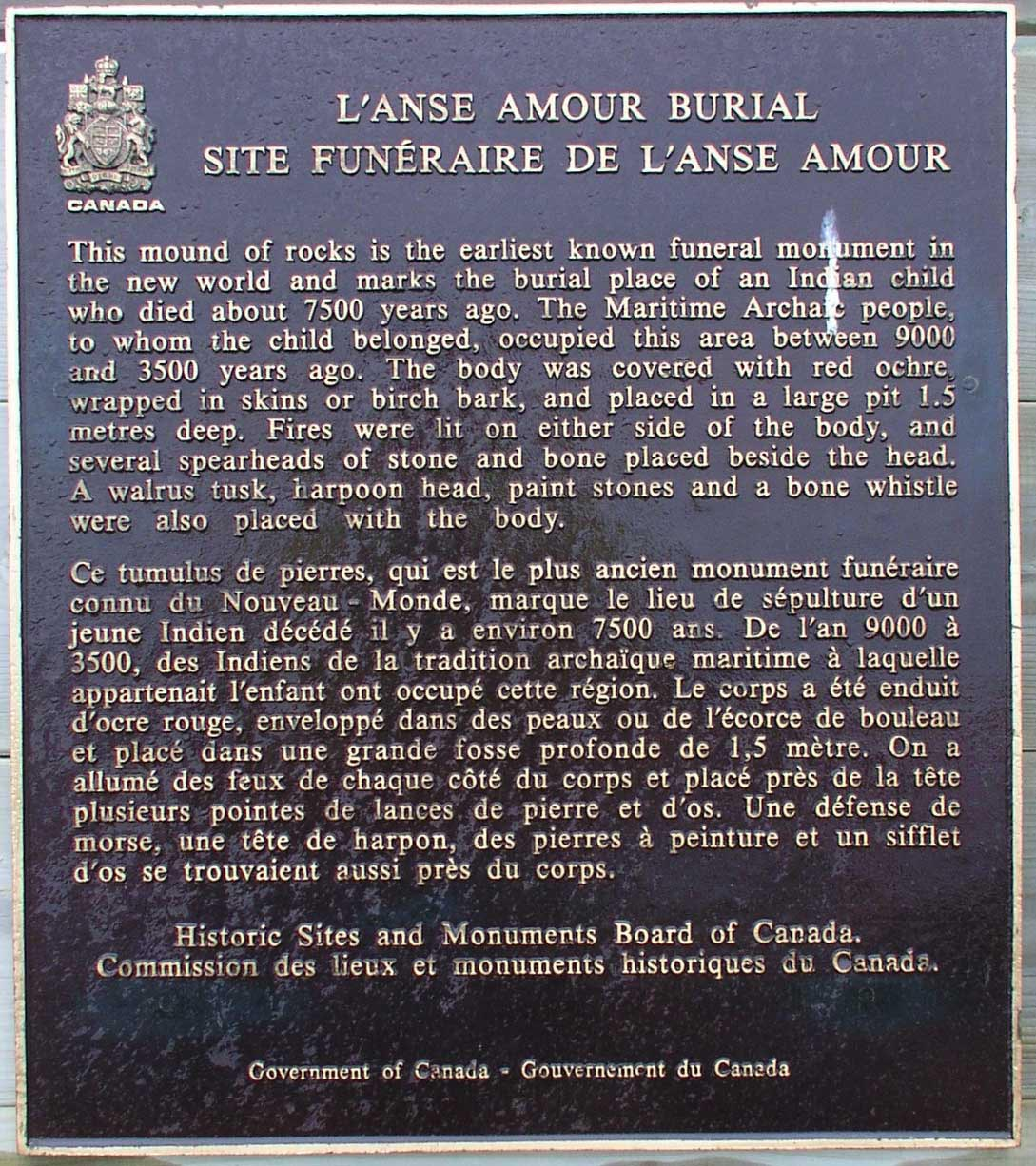
Burial mound plaque

Icebergs and a narrow passage make the Strait of Belle Isle a hazardous body of water. At L'Anse Amour, the Gulf of St. Lawrence flows into the Atlantic Ocean through the Strait of Belle Isle. The wreck of one of the ships to go aground in the passage, HMS Raleigh, is located near Point Amour. A trail along the shore allows visitors to see the rusting remains of the ship, which went aground on August 8, 1922 and was demolished by explosives in 1926.

Strait of Belle Isle

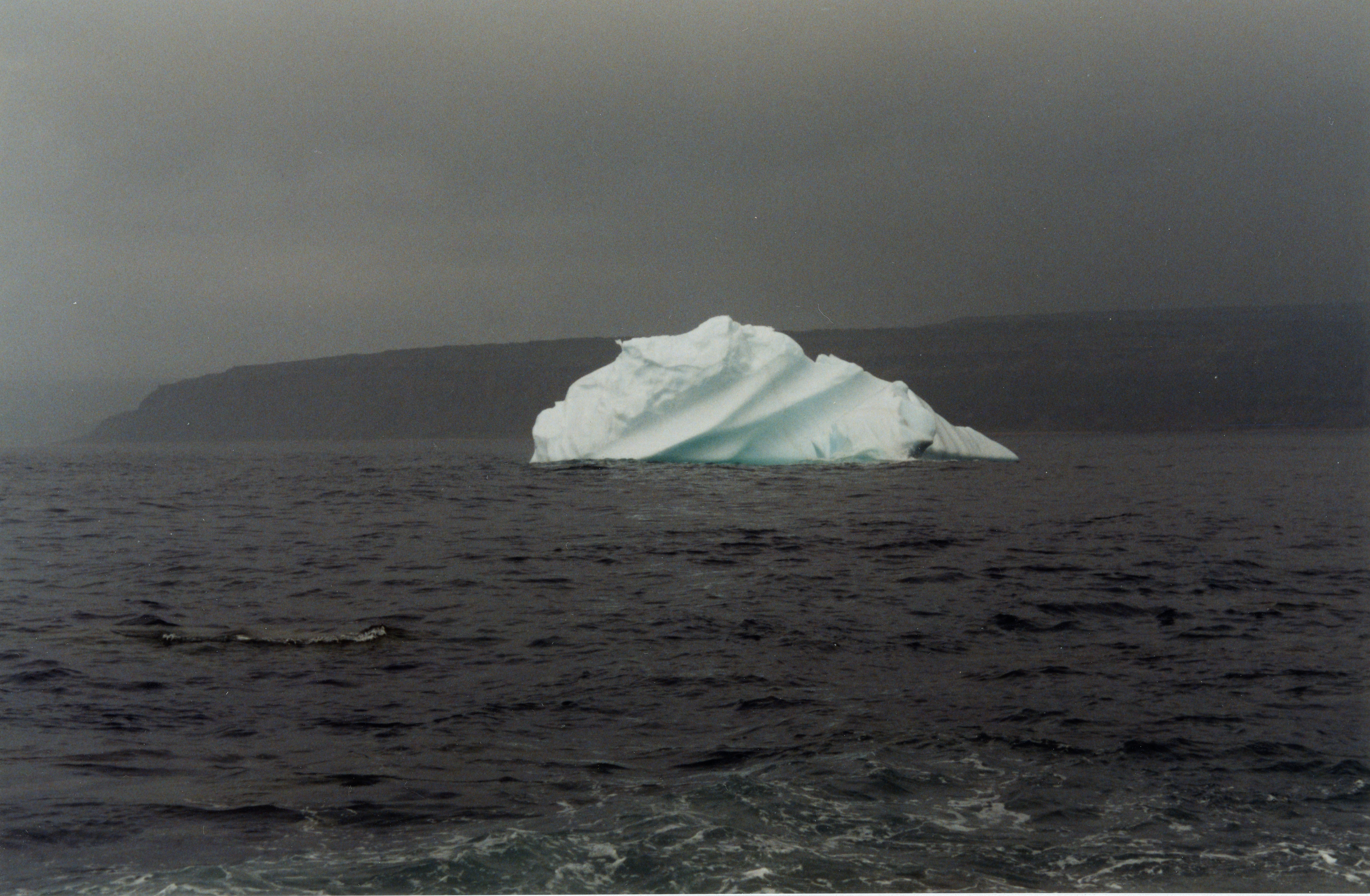
Remains of an iceberg in July

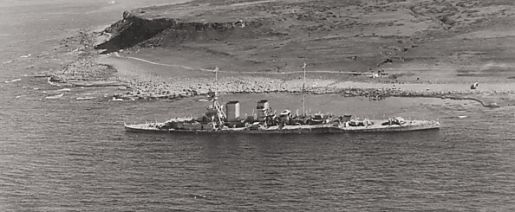
Light cruiser HMS Raleigh, lost on 8 August 1922

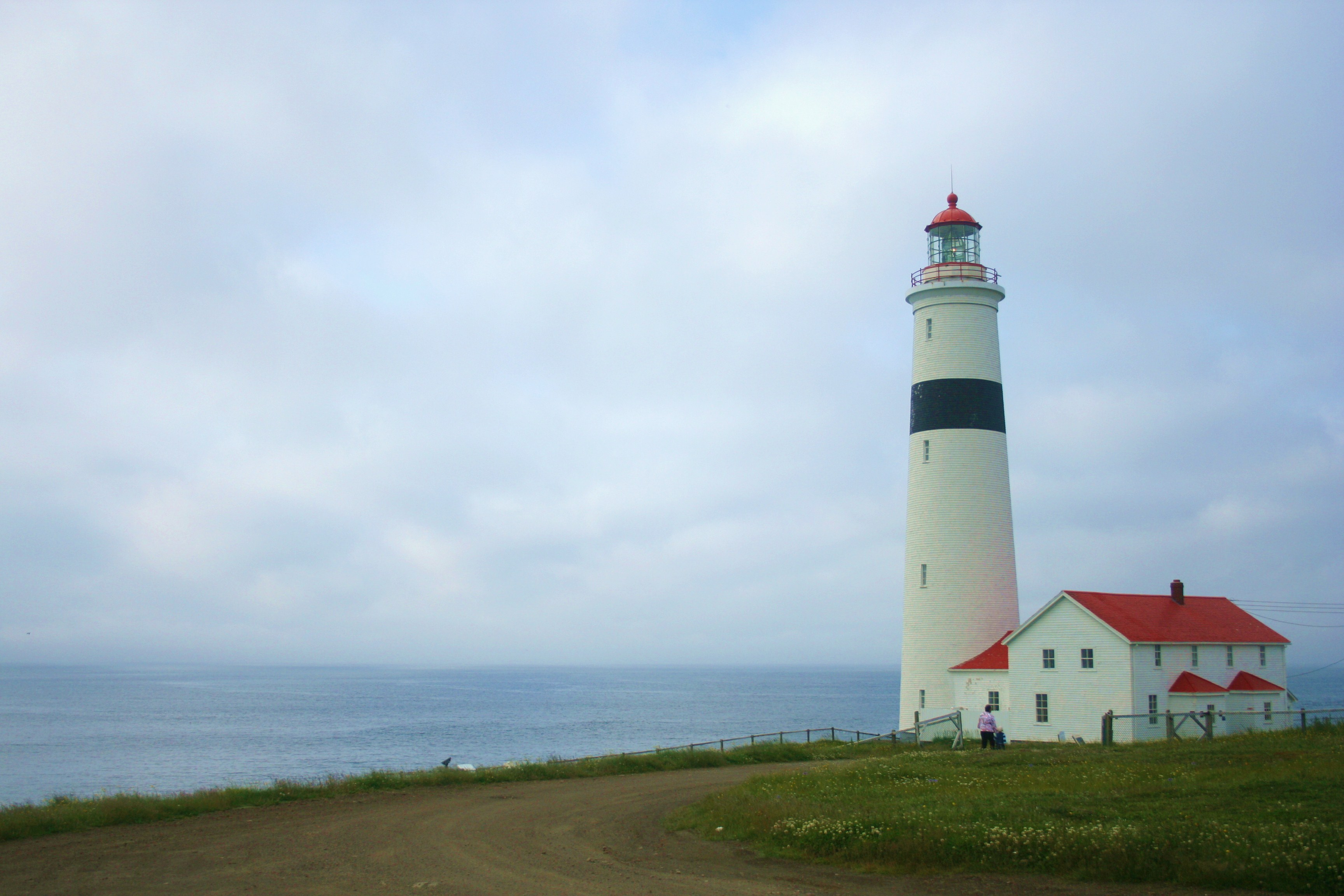
Point Amour Lighthouse, Forteau Bay

== Attractions ==
L'Anse Amour was nominated in a 2007 CBC Seven Wonders of Canada competition. The nomination cited the seven friendly population of the hamlet and attractions of the area.

The tallest lighthouse in Atlantic Canada is located at nearby Point Amour. A Maritime Archaic mound burial dating to 7500 years ago, L' Anse Amour Burial National Historic Site, is also located nearby.

== See also ==
- List of communities in Newfoundland and Labrador
