= HMS Raleigh (1919) =

Royal Navy heavy cruiser

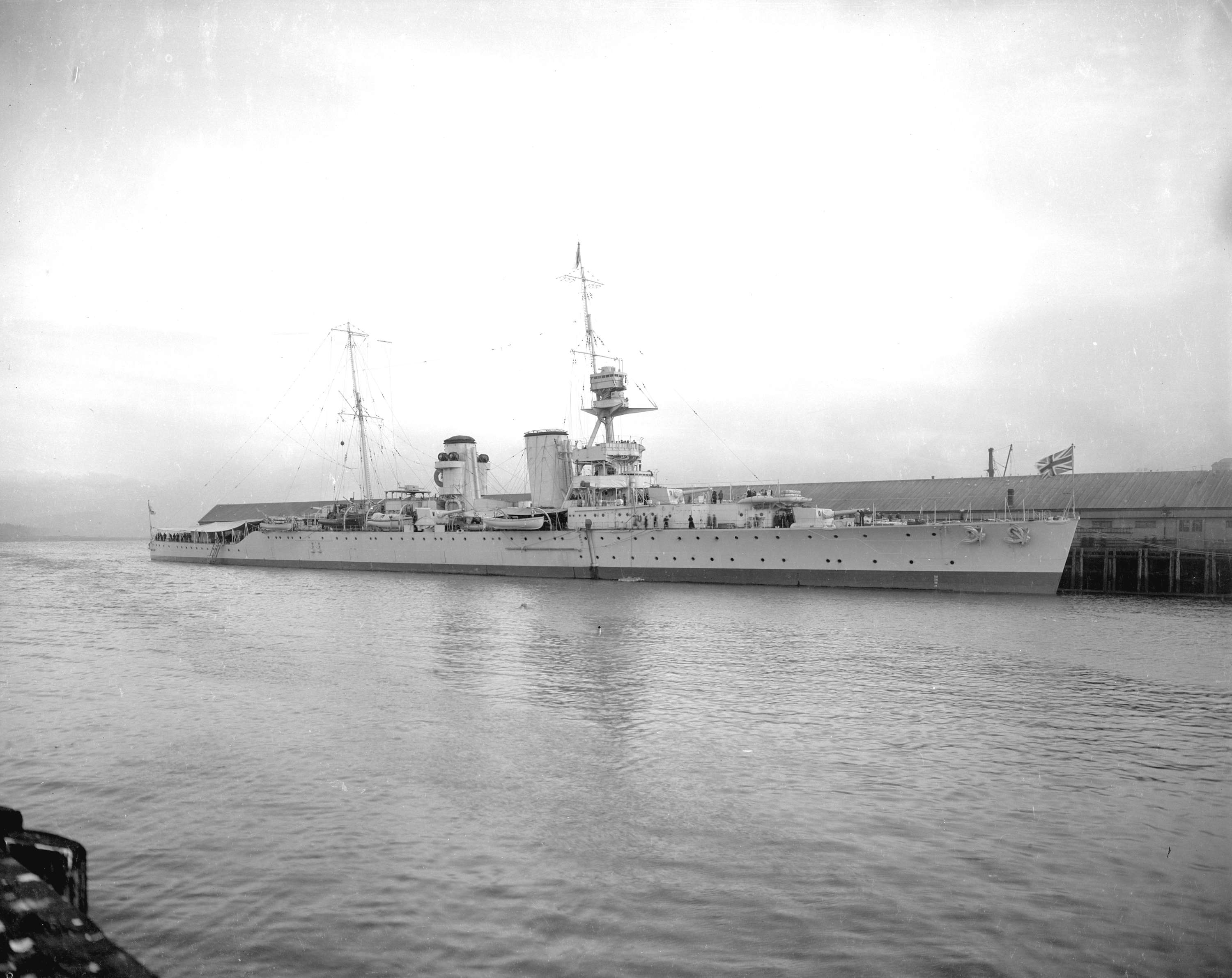
- Raleigh visiting Vancouver, British Columbia, in 1921

History

United Kingdom
- Name: Raleigh
- Namesake: Sir Walter Raleigh
- Builder: William Beardmore, Dalmuir
- Laid down: 9 December 1915
- Launched: 28 August 1919
- Completed: July 1921
- Identification: Pennant number: 96
- Fate: Wrecked, 8 August 1922

General characteristics (as built)
- Class & type: Hawkins-class heavy cruiser
- Displacement: 9,750 long tons (9,910 t) (standard); 12,190 long tons (12,390 t) (deep load)
- Length: 605 ft (184.4 m) (o/a)
- Beam: 65 ft (19.8 m)
- Draught: 19 ft 3 in (5.9 m) (deep load)
- Installed power: 10 × Yarrow boilers; 70,000 shp (52,000 kW)
- Propulsion: 4 × shafts; 4 × geared steam turbines
- Speed: 31 knots (57 km/h; 36 mph)
- Range: 5,640 nmi (10,450 km; 6,490 mi) at 10 knots (19 km/h; 12 mph)
- Complement: 690
- Armament: 7 × single 7.5 in (191 mm) guns; 6 × single 3 in (76 mm) low-angle guns; 4 × single 3 in AA guns; 2 × single 2-pdr (1.6 in (40 mm)) AA guns; 6 × 21 in (533 mm) torpedo tubes
- Armour: Belt: 1.5–3 in (3.8–7.6 cm); Deck: 1–1.5 in (2.5–3.8 cm); Gun shields: 1 in (2.5 cm)

HMS Raleigh was one of five Hawkins-class heavy cruisers built for the Royal Navy during the First World War, although the ship was not completed until 1921. She was assigned to the North America and West Indies Station when she commissioned and often served as a flagship. After visiting ports in the Caribbean Sea, Gulf of Mexico and both coasts of the United States and Canada in 1921–1922, Raleigh ran aground off Labrador in August 1922 with the loss of a dozen crewmen. The ship was partially salvaged in place and was demolished with explosives in 1926, although she remains a diveable wreck in very shallow water.

== Design and description ==
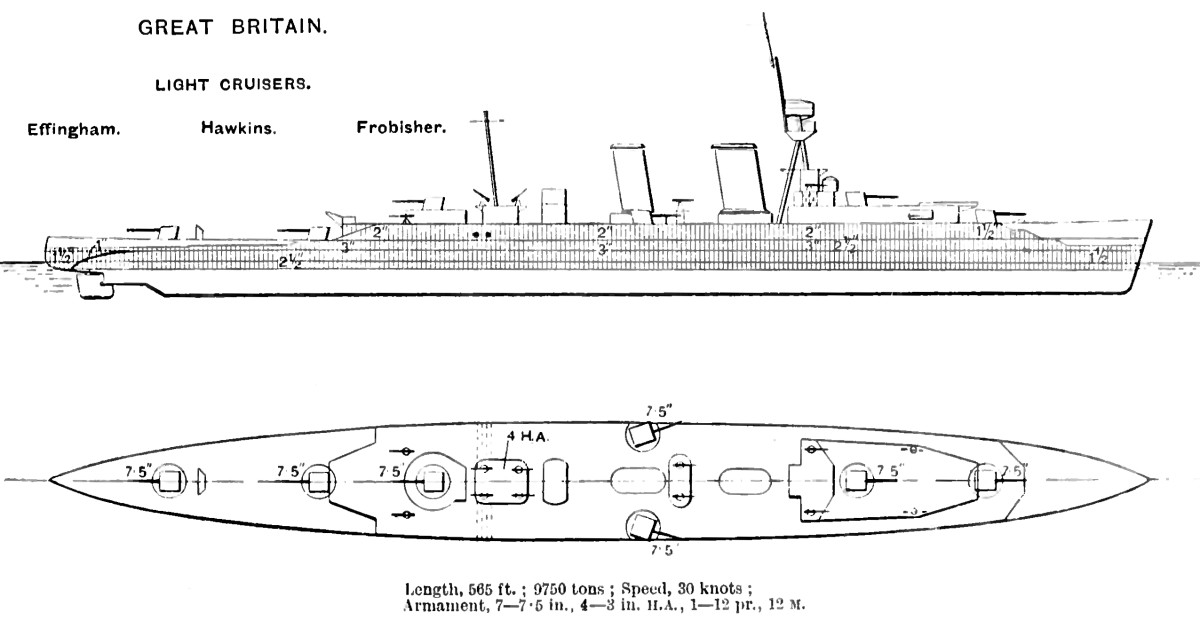
Right plan and elevation from Brassey's Naval Annual 1923

The Hawkins-class cruisers were designed to be able to hunt down commerce raiders in the open ocean, for which they needed a heavy armament, high speed and long range. The ships had an overall length of 605 feet (184.4 m), a beam of 65 feet (19.8 m) and a draught of 19 feet 3 inches (5.9 m) at deep load. They displaced 9,750 long tons (9,910 t) at normal load and 12,190 long tons (12,390 t) at deep load. Their crew consisted of 712 officers and ratings.

The ships were originally designed with 60,000-shaft-horsepower (45,000 kW) propulsion machinery, but the Admiralty decided in 1917 to replace their four coal-fired boilers with more powerful oil-burning ones. This change could only be applied to the three least-advanced ships, including Raleigh, although she was the only one who received the full upgrade. The ship was powered by four Brown-Curtis geared steam turbine sets, each driving one propeller shaft using steam provided by a dozen Yarrow boilers. The turbines were rated at 70,000 shp (52,000 kW) for a speed of 31 knots (57 km/h; 36 mph). When Raleigh ran her sea trials in 1920, she reached, but did not exceed, her designed speed. Raleigh carried enough fuel oil to give her a range of 5,640 nautical miles (10,450 km; 6,490 mi) at 10 knots (19 km/h; 12 mph).

The main armament of the Hawkins-class ships consisted of seven 7.5-inch (191 mm) Mk VI guns in single mounts protected by 1-inch (25 mm) gun shields. They were arranged with five guns on the centreline, four of which were in superfiring pairs fore and aft of the superstructure, the fifth gun on the quarterdeck, and the last two as wing guns abreast the aft funnel. Their secondary armament consisted of ten 3-inch (76 mm) 20 cwt guns. (Note: "Cwt" is the abbreviation for hundredweight, 20 cwt referring to the weight of the gun.) Six of these were in low-angle mounts, two in casemates between the forward 7.5-inch guns, another pair on platforms abreast the conning tower and the remaining guns on a platform between the funnels, although these last two guns were removed in 1921. The last four served as anti-aircraft (AA) guns and were positioned around the base of the mainmast. The rest of their anti-aircraft suite consisted of a pair of 2-pounder (1.6-inch (40 mm) AA guns. The ships were also fitted with six 21-inch (533 mm) torpedo tubes, one submerged and two above water on each broadside.

The guns of the first three Hawkins-class ships to be completed, Vindictive, Hawkins and Raleigh, were controlled by a mechanical Mark I Dreyer Fire-control Table. It used data provided by the 15-foot (4.6 m) coincidence rangefinder in the pedestal-type gunnery director positioned under the spotting top at the head of the tripod mast. The ships were also fitted with one 12-foot (3.7 m) and a 9-foot (2.7 m) rangefinder.

The Hawkins class were protected by a full-length waterline armoured belt that covered most of the ships' sides. It was thickest over the boiler and engine rooms, ranging from 1.5 to 3 inches (38 to 76 mm) thick. Their magazines were protected by an additional 0.5 to 1 inch (13 to 25 mm) of armour. There was a 1-inch aft transverse bulkhead and the conning tower was protected by 3-inch armour plates. The ships' deck protection consisted of 1 to 1.5 inches of high-tensile steel.

== Construction and career ==
Raleigh was named for the Elizabethan explorer and statesman Sir Walter Raleigh and was the sixth ship of her name to serve in the Royal Navy. The ship was laid down by William Beardmore & Company at their shipyard in Dalmuir on 9 December 1915, launched on 28 August 1919 and completed in July 1921. Captain Arthur Bromley was appointed in command on 14 February 1920. Raleigh was intended to serve as the flagship of Vice-Admiral Trevylyan Napier, Commander-in-Chief of the North America and West Indies Station (which was to become the America and West Indies Station, with the addition of South American waters and the absorption of the Pacific Station in 1926), and departed on 26 July, bound for her new base, the Royal Naval Dockyard in the Imperial fortress colony of Bermuda, to rendezvous with the admiral, but he died on 30 July.

Sir William Pakenham, the new commander of the America and West Indies Station, hoisted his flag aboard the ship on 12 August and she departed for Montreal, Quebec, on 1 September. Two months later, Raleigh returned to Bermuda and then visited Jamaica. She passed through the Panama Canal in January 1922 and continued northwards to drop anchor in San Francisco, California, on the 21st. The ship returned to the Bermuda the following month and then visited ports around Chesapeake Bay, including Washington, D.C. in May. Two months later, Raleigh returned to Canada where the general public toured the ship. On 3 August, Pakenham transferred his flag to the light cruiser HMS Calcutta and Raleigh became a private ship.

On 8 August Raleigh was bound for Forteau, Labrador, from Hawke's Bay, Newfoundland, and she entered a heavy fog in the Strait of Belle Isle en route. The ship ran aground at L'Anse Amour, Labrador, that afternoon, 15 minutes after entering the fog. She did not strike with much force, but the strong wind quickly blew her stern onto the rocks, which pounded multiple holes in the hull and gave her an eight-degree list. A dozen sailors died from drowning and hypothermia as the crew abandoned ship. Many men were able to find shelter ashore while the others lit fires to stay warm.

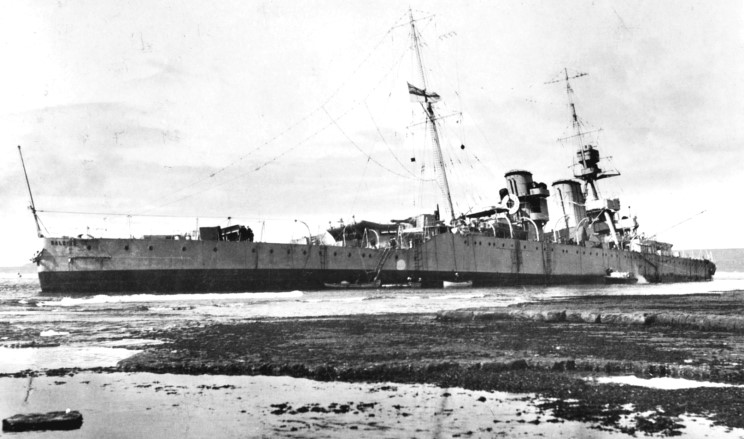
Raleigh hard aground at L'Anse Amour, August 1922

They returned to the ship the following morning to evaluate the ship's condition and to recover personal belongings, only to find a 260-foot-long (79 m) gash in the hull and most personal items ruined by leaking fuel oil. The light cruisers Capetown and Calcutta arrived later that day and fed the crewmen. In the bad weather little could be done immediately and many of the survivors were marched to Forteau to be transported back to Britain. The 18,481-gross register ton (GRT) Canadian ocean liner RMS Empress of France arrived on 10 August to load the crewmen, but her captain refused to do so as he did not have enough provisions for all the men. They had to wait several more days before the brand-new 16,402 GRT ocean liner SS Montrose arrived. Several hundred men were kept back to salvage Raleigh and to protect the wreck from locals intent on the same task. It was stripped of everything useful and the wreck was abandoned in place, still upright. Shortly after their return to the UK, Bromley and his navigator were both court martialled and found negligent in their duty; they were severely reprimanded and dismissed their ship. Their careers over, both men requested retirement.

Embarrassed by the sight of the apparently intact Raleigh visible to every passing ship, the Board of Admiralty deemed the wreck a hazard to shipping in 1926 and ordered it to be refloated. A survey found that this was impossible and the captains of Capetown and Calcutta were ordered to remove as much as possible from the wreck and then demolish the remains so that it was unrecognizable. The crew of the former ship carried out the first task and the latter's crew blew Raleigh's remains apart using depth charges under the command of Captain Andrew Cunningham over five days beginning on 23 September. (Note: There is much confusion as to when the ship was demolished. Naval historian M. J. Whitley states that Raleigh was blown up in July 1928, although naval historian Antony Preston says that it was in 1927.)

Cunningham's men made no effort to recover the pieces of the ship and remains are still plentiful. Royal Canadian Navy dive teams were forced to visit the site in 2003 and 2005 to remove live 7.5-inch ammunition, although there were reports of shells still visible as of 2016.
