= 2011 Liberal Party of Newfoundland and Labrador leadership election =

Two leadership elections were held in the Liberal Party of Newfoundland and Labrador in 2011:

- May 2011 Liberal Party of Newfoundland and Labrador leadership election
- August 2011 Liberal Party of Newfoundland and Labrador leadership election
