= Todd Russell =

Canadian politician (born 1966)

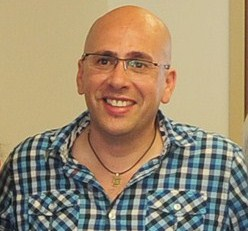

Member of Parliament for Labrador
- In office May 24, 2005 – May 30, 2011
- Preceded by: Lawrence D. O'Brien
- Succeeded by: Peter Penashue

Personal details
- Born: December 22, 1966 (age 59) St. Anthony, Newfoundland
- Party: Liberal Party of Canada
- Profession: Metis affairs leader

Todd Norman Dwayne Russell (born December 22, 1966) is a Canadian politician and was the Liberal member of Parliament for the riding of Labrador, Newfoundland and Labrador from 2005 to 2011.

== Early life ==
Russell was born in St. Anthony, Newfoundland and raised in William's Harbour. He is of Inuit-Métis descent and was the president of NunatuKavut, an unrecognised Indigenous group, until his by-election win. He was educated at Memorial University in St. John's.

== Federal politics ==
On May 24, 2005, Russell won a by-election in the riding of Labrador, vacated by the death of Liberal MP Lawrence D. O'Brien. His victory consolidated the standing of the federal Liberals in the minority parliament, which made it easier for the Liberals to pass budget legislation. He was re-elected in the 2006 and 2008 federal elections and served as the Critic for Aboriginal Affairs in the Official Opposition Shadow Cabinet.

In the 2011 election, Russell was defeated by Conservative Peter Penashue.

=== After federal politics ===
Following his electoral defeat Russell returned to the position of NunatuKavut president and has been vocal in his opposition to the Muskrat Falls hydroelectric project.

In 2016, Russell called on the federal government to apologize for the treatment of residential school survivors from Newfoundland and Labrador.

== Electoral record ==
2011 Canadian federal election: Labrador
| Party | Candidate | Votes | % | ±% | Expenditures |
|---|---|---|---|---|---|
| Conservative | Peter Penashue | 4,256 | 39.81 | +31.84 | $89,997.05 |
| Liberal | Todd Russell | 4,177 | 39.07 | −31.21 | $30,016.49 |
| New Democratic | Jacob Larkin | 2,120 | 19.83 | +1.98 | $29,968.41 |
| Green | George C.R. Barrett | 139 | 1.30 | −2.61 | $0.00 |
| Total valid votes/expense limit | | 10,692 | 100.0 | – | $84,468.09 |
| Total rejected, declined and unmarked ballots | | 52 | 0.48 | −0.37 | |
| Turnout | | 10,744 | 52.91 | +14.31 | |
| Eligible voters | | 20,305 | | | |
| Conservative gain from Liberal | | Swing | | +31.52 | |
Conservative candidate Peter Penashue was found to have spent above the mandated expense limit, precipitating his resignation and subsequent by-election.

2008 Canadian federal election
| Party | Candidate | Votes | % | ±% | Expenditures |
|---|---|---|---|---|---|
| Liberal | Todd Russell | 5,426 | 70.28 | +19.75 | $26,887 |
| New Democratic | Phyllis Artiss | 1,378 | 17.85 | +8.77 | $5,886 |
| Conservative | Lacey Lewis | 615 | 7.97 | -31.70 | $15,728 |
| Green | Nyssa Christine McLeod | 302 | 3.91 | +3.19 | none listed |
| Total valid votes/Expense limit | | 7,721 | 100.0 | – | $81,667 |
| Total rejected, declined and unmarked ballots | | 66 | 0.85 | +0.40 | |
| Turnout | | 7,787 | 38.60 | -19.8 | |
| Eligible voters | | 20,175 | | | |
| Liberal hold | | Swing | | +5.49 | |

2006 Canadian federal election
| Party | Candidate | Votes | % | ±% | Expenditures |
|---|---|---|---|---|---|
| Liberal | Todd Russell | 5,768 | 50.53 | -0.95 | $40,903.10 |
| Conservative | Joe Goudie | 4,528 | 39.67 | +7.34 | $36,381.98 |
| New Democratic | Jacob Edward Larkin | 1,037 | 9.08 | -0.81 | $164.95 |
| Green | Gail Zwicker | 82 | 0.72 | +0.08 | none listed |
| Total valid votes/Expense limit | | 11,415 | 100.0 | – | $75,653 |
| Total rejected, declined and unmarked ballots | | 52 | 0.45 | -0.10 | |
| Turnout | | 11,467 | 57.99 | +4.55 | |
| Eligible voters | | 19,774 | | | |
| Liberal hold | | Swing | | -4.14 | |
Changes are from the 2005 by-election

Canadian federal by-election, May 24, 2005 Death of Lawrence D. O'Brien, 16 December 2004
| Party | Candidate | Votes | % | ±% | Expenditures |
|---|---|---|---|---|---|
| Liberal | Todd Russell | 5,438 | 51.48 | -10.75 | $53,970.30 |
| Conservative | Graham Letto | 3,415 | 32.33 | +16.56 | $73,509.62 |
| New Democratic | Frances Fry | 1,045 | 9.89 | +0.25 | $26,121.42 |
| Independent | Ern Condon | 598 | 5.66 | -4.69 | $254.00 |
| Green | Jason Crummey | 68 | 0.64 | -1.37 | $78.45 |
| Total valid votes/Expense limit | | 10,564 | 100.0 | – | $74,995 |
| Total rejected, declined and unmarked ballots | | 58 | 0.55 | +0.03 | |
| Turnout | | 10,622 | 53.44 | +8.62 | |
| Eligible voters | | 19,876 | | | |
| Liberal hold | | Swing | | -13.6 | |
