= Bill Rompkey =

Canadian educator and politician

The Honourable Bill Rompkey PC

Deputy Leader of the Government in the Senate
- In office January 15, 2004 – February 5, 2006
- Prime Minister: Paul Martin
- Leader: Jack Austin
- Preceded by: Fernand Robichaud
- Succeeded by: Gerald Comeau

Government Whip in the Senate
- In office September 7, 2001 – January 14, 2004
- Prime Minister: Jean Chrétien; Paul Martin
- Leader: Sharon Carstairs; Jack Austin
- Preceded by: Léonce Mercier
- Succeeded by: Rose-Marie Losier-Cool
Canadian Cabinet
Minister of State (Mines)
In office June 30, 1984 – September 16, 1984
Prime Minister	John Turner
Minister	Gerald Regan
Preceded by	Position established
Succeeded by	Robert Layton
Minister of State (Transport)
In office June 30, 1984 – September 16, 1984
Prime Minister	John Turner
Minister	Lloyd Axworthy
Preceded by	Robert Howie (1980)
Succeeded by	Benoît Bouchard
Minister of National Revenue
In office March 3, 1980 – September 29, 1982
Prime Minister	Pierre Trudeau
Preceded by	Walter Baker
Succeeded by	Pierre Bussières
Parliamentary constituencies
Canadian Senator from Newfoundland and Labrador
In office September 21, 1995 – May 13, 2011
Nominated by	Jean Chrétien
Appointed by	Roméo LeBlanc
Preceded by	Jack Marshall
Succeeded by	Norman Doyle (2012)
Member of Parliament for Labrador (Grand Falls—White Bay—Labrador; 1972–1988)
In office October 30, 1972 – September 20, 1995
Preceded by	Ambrose Peddle
Succeeded by	Lawrence D. O'Brien (1996)

Personal details
- Born: William Hubert Rompkey; May 13, 1936 Belleoram, Dominion of Newfoundland
- Died: March 21, 2017 (aged 80) Ottawa, Ontario, Canada
- Party: Liberal
- Spouse: Carolyn Pike (m. 1963)
- Children: Hilary Rompkey; Peter Rompkey
- Education: Bishop Feild College; Memorial University (BA, 1957), MA, LLD (Hon.), University of London; University of Toronto
- Occupation: Canadian Senator
- Profession: Educator
- Cabinet: Deputy Leader of the Government in the Senate (2004–2006); Government Whip in the Senate (2001–2004); Minister of State (Mines) (1984); Minister of State (Small business and Tourism) (1982–1983); Minister of National Revenue (1980–1982)

Military service
- Allegiance: Canada
- Branch/service: Royal Canadian Navy
- Rank: Lieutenant (Reserve)

William Hubert Rompkey PC (May 13, 1936 – March 21, 2017) was a Canadian educator and politician from Newfoundland. A member of the Liberal Party, he served as member of Parliament from Labrador from 1972 to 1995, and as a senator from Newfoundland and Labrador from 1995 to 2011.

== Early life and education ==
Rompkey was born in Belleoram, Fortune Bay, Newfoundland. He attended Bishop Feild College in St. John's. In 1953, after he left Bishop Feild College, Rompkey entered Memorial University, where he graduated with a BA, a diploma in education, and an MA. Rompkey continued his studies at the University of London, England, where he received the Academic Diploma in Education.

== Career as an educator ==
After Rompkey returned from his studies in London, he started his career as an educator. Rompkey taught school at Upper Island Cove and in St. John's. In 1963, he married fellow Memorial University graduate Carolyn Pike, and then, lured by Tony Paddon, Rompkey took an appointment as principal of the Yale Amalgamated School in North West River. Rompkey later became the first Superintendent of Education with the Labrador East Integrated School Board, a position he held until 1971. In January 1972, Rompkey was studying for his Ph.D. in Adult Education at the University of Toronto when he won the nomination to represent the Grand Falls-White Bay-Labrador riding for the Liberal Party.

== Parliamentary career ==
=== The House of Commons ===
Rompkey was first elected to the House of Commons of Canada in the 1972 federal election as the Liberal Member of Parliament (MP) for Grand Falls—White Bay—Labrador, the first of seven consecutive election victories. He defeated Progressive Conservative incumbent Ambrose Peddle to win the seat. In 1980, Prime Minister Pierre Trudeau elevated Rompkey to the Canadian Cabinet as Minister of National Revenue. In 1982, he was moved to the position of Minister of State for Small Businesses and Tourism becoming Minister of State for Mines in 1984. He was Minister of State for Transport in the short-lived Cabinet of John Turner until the government's defeat in the 1984 election.

=== Senate ===
In 1995, Governor General of Canada Roméo LeBlanc, on the advice of Prime Minister Jean Chrétien, appointed Rompkey to the Senate of Canada. In 2001, he became Government Whip in the Senate and was deputy leader of the government in the Senate until the Conservatives took power in February 2006 as a result of a federal election. He reached the mandatory retirement age of 75 on May 13, 2011.
