= Point Amour Lighthouse =

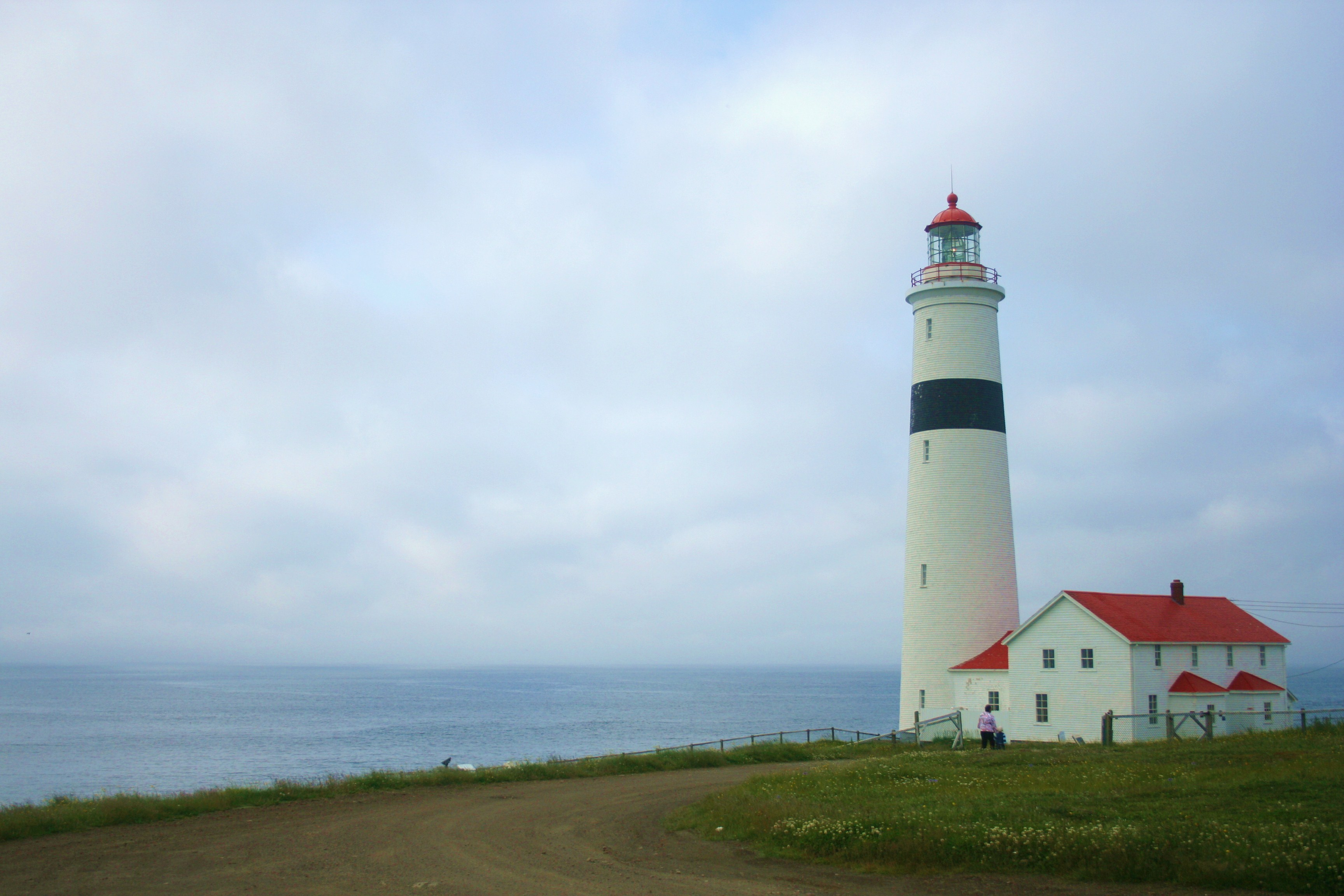
- Forteau Bay, Strait of Belle Isle, Point Amour, Provincial Historic Site, Newfoundland and Labrador
- Location: L'Anse Amour; Newfoundland and Labrador; Canada
- Coordinates: 51°27′38″N 56°51′30″W

Tower
- Constructed: 1854-1858
- Construction: limestone covered with brick and clapboard tower
- Automated: 1960s
- Height: 125 feet
- Shape: cylindrical tower with balcony and lantern
- Markings: white tower with a horizontal black band, red dome
- Operator: Labrador Straits Historical Development Corporation
- Heritage: classified federal heritage building of Canada, heritage lighthouse
- Fog signal: 1 blast every 30s.

Light
- Focal height: 46 metres (151 ft)
- Lens: second order Fresnel lens
- Range: 18 nautical miles
- Characteristic: Fl W 20s.

The Point Amour Lighthouse is located on the shore of Forteau Bay, in Strait of Belle Isle, Labrador Peninsula, L'Anse Amour hamlet, in southern Labrador, Newfoundland and Labrador, province, Canada.

It was completed in 1857. It is the tallest lighthouse in Atlantic Canada, and the second tallest one in all of Canada, reaching a height of 109 feet (33m).

The Point Amour Lighthouse was part of a series of four lighthouses built in the 1850s to allow for safer passage for the increased steamship travel between Europe and the new world at that time. The cylindrical tower is built of limestone and is painted white with a black band. The limestone used for construction of the lighthouse was obtained from local quarries. Other materials such as timber and brick were not as accessible and were shipped from Quebec to L’Anse au Loup. From L’Anse au Loup they were brought to the site where the lighthouse was constructed, four miles away. It was built in the series of Imperial Towers and is designated a Provincial Historic Site. The residential part of the lighthouse, completed in 1857, has been renovated and now serves as a museum. The site was also home to a Marconi Station, of which only the foundations survive.

A second order Fresnel lens with a focal plane at 152 feet (46 m) above sea level is in use. In 1996 the operation of the lighthouse was converted to an automatic system. The light characteristic is a period of light of 16 seconds with an adjacent pause of 4 seconds. A fog signal may be sounded from a separate building.

== Lighthouse keepers ==
Lightkeepers	Time
John Blampied	1857-1869
Pierre Godier	1869-1879
Matthew Wyatt	1879-1889
Thomas Wyatt	1889-1919
Jeff Wyatt	1919-1963
Milton Elliott	1963-1969
Max Sheppard	1969-1995

In the 1960s the lighthouse became automated.

== See also ==
- List of lighthouses in Newfoundland and Labrador
- List of lighthouses in Canada
