= Ambrose Peddle =

Canadian politician

Member of the Canadian Parliament for Grand Falls—White Bay—Labrador
- In office 1968–1972
- Preceded by: Andrew Chatwood
- Succeeded by: Bill Rompkey

Personal details
- Born: Ambrose Hubert Peddle; 8 October 1927 Corner Brook, Newfoundland
- Died: 10 March 2014 (aged 86) Corner Brook, Newfoundland and Labrador, Canada
- Party: Progressive Conservative
- Profession: businessperson, insurance agent

Ambrose Hubert Peddle (8 October 1927 – 10 March 2014) was a Canadian politician.

Born in Corner Brook, Newfoundland, Peddle worked for Newfoundland Railway from 1945 to 1947 and Customs & Excise from 1947 to 1949. From 1949 to 1951, he worked for the Government of Canada's Unemployment Insurance Commission. From 1951 to 1963, he was a retail furniture and appliance sales manager. From 1963 to 1975, he was the owner of Small Business Enterprises. From 1961 to 1966, he was Mayor of Windsor, Newfoundland and Labrador. He was elected to the Newfoundland and Labrador House of Assembly in 1962. As a Progressive Conservative, he was elected to the House of Commons of Canada for the riding of Grand Falls—White Bay—Labrador in the 1968 federal election and lost his reelection in 1972. Appointed by the government of Premier Frank Moores, Peddle served as the Parliamentary Commissioner (Ombudsman) for Newfoundland and Labrador from 1975 to 1990. He died in 2014.
