= Joseph Goudie =

Canadian politician

The Honourable Denzil Joseph Goudie ONL ECNL was born in 1939 in the small community of Mud Lake, Labrador, Canada. His mother was writer Elizabeth Goudie.

Goudie is known for his career as a broadcaster for the CBC, and as a provincial public servant. He has also served as president of the Labrador Metis Association. The organization Hospitality Newfoundland and Labrador has called him an icon of Labrador's rich heritage, citing his dedication to Labrador tradition and tireless efforts in promoting the province. He has served as a national parks consultant and is widely respected for his knowledge and appreciation of nature.

Goudie served as Town Clerk and Town Manager of Happy Valley before making the jump to provincial politics. He was elected to the Newfoundland and Labrador provincial House of Assembly in 1975, where he served until his defeat in 1985. During this time, he held the posts of Minister of Rural Development (1978–1982), Minister of Rural, Agriculture, and Northern Development (1982–1985), and Minister of Fisheries (1985). Goudie ran for the federal Conservative Party of Canada in the 2006 federal election in the riding of Labrador. He later served with Peter Penashue's campaign.
