= Andrew Chatwood =

Canadian politician

- Official 1966 portrait

Member of Parliament for Grand Falls—White Bay—Labrador
- In office September 1966 – June 1968

Personal details
- Born: 3 July 1932 St. John's, Newfoundland
- Died: 3 August 2014 (aged 82) New Westminster, British Columbia
- Party: Liberal
- Profession: administrative supervisor

Andrew Chatwood (3 July 1932 – 3 August 2014) was a Canadian administrator and politician. Chatwood was a Liberal party member of the House of Commons of Canada. He was an administrative supervisor by career.

He was first elected at the Grand Falls—White Bay—Labrador riding in a 19 September 1966 by-election, but defeated there in the 1968 federal election by Ambrose Peddle of the Progressive Conservative party. He died of heart failure in 2014.
