= Forteau Bay =

Coordinates: 51.466°N 56.931°W

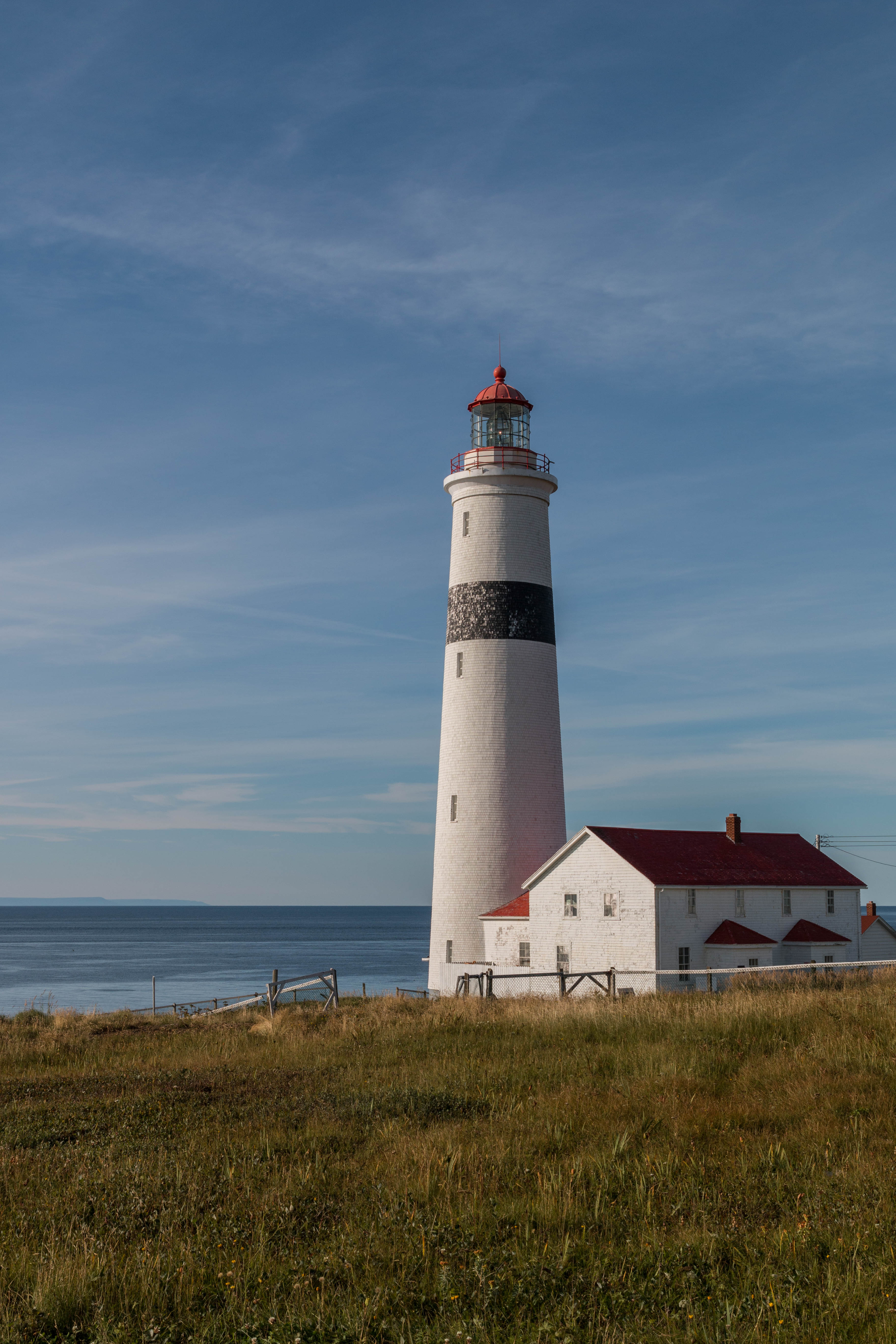
Point Amour lighthouse, Forteau Bay, Strait of Belle Isle

Forteau Bay is located in the Strait of Belle Isle, off the coast of Labrador, Newfoundland and Labrador, Canada.
