= South Aulatsivik Island =

Island in Canada

Coordinates: 56°45′51″N 61°30′59″W

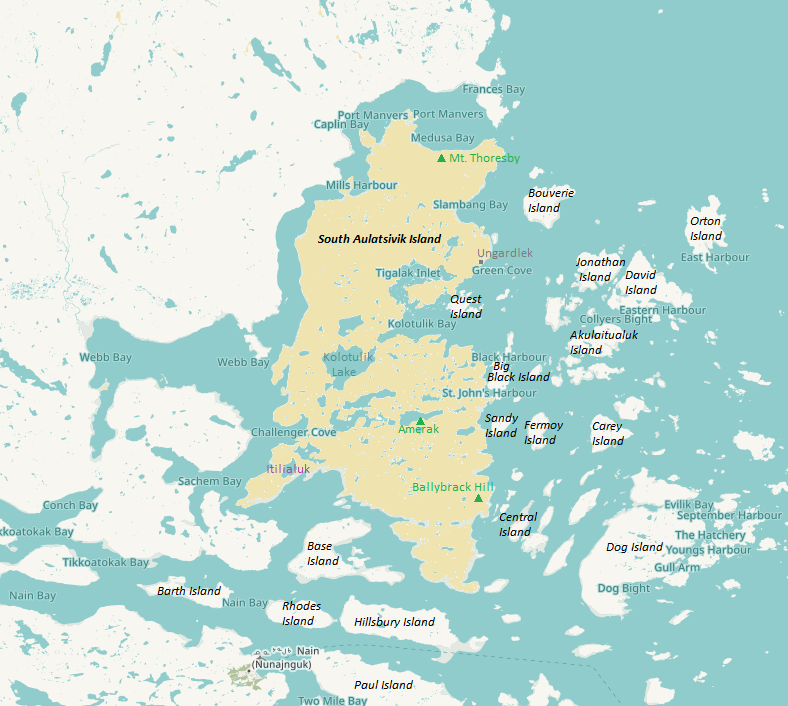
Map of South Aulatsivik Island

South Aulatsivik Island is a Canadian island in northeastern part of Labrador in the province of Newfoundland and Labrador.

It is situated north of Nain at entrance of Webb's Bay, fronting the Atlantic Ocean.

The island's area measures 456 km^{2} making it the province's second largest island after the island of Newfoundland. Its highest point is Mount Thoresby (3,007 ft; 917 m).

== See also ==
- North Aulatsivik Island
