= Strait of Belle Isle =

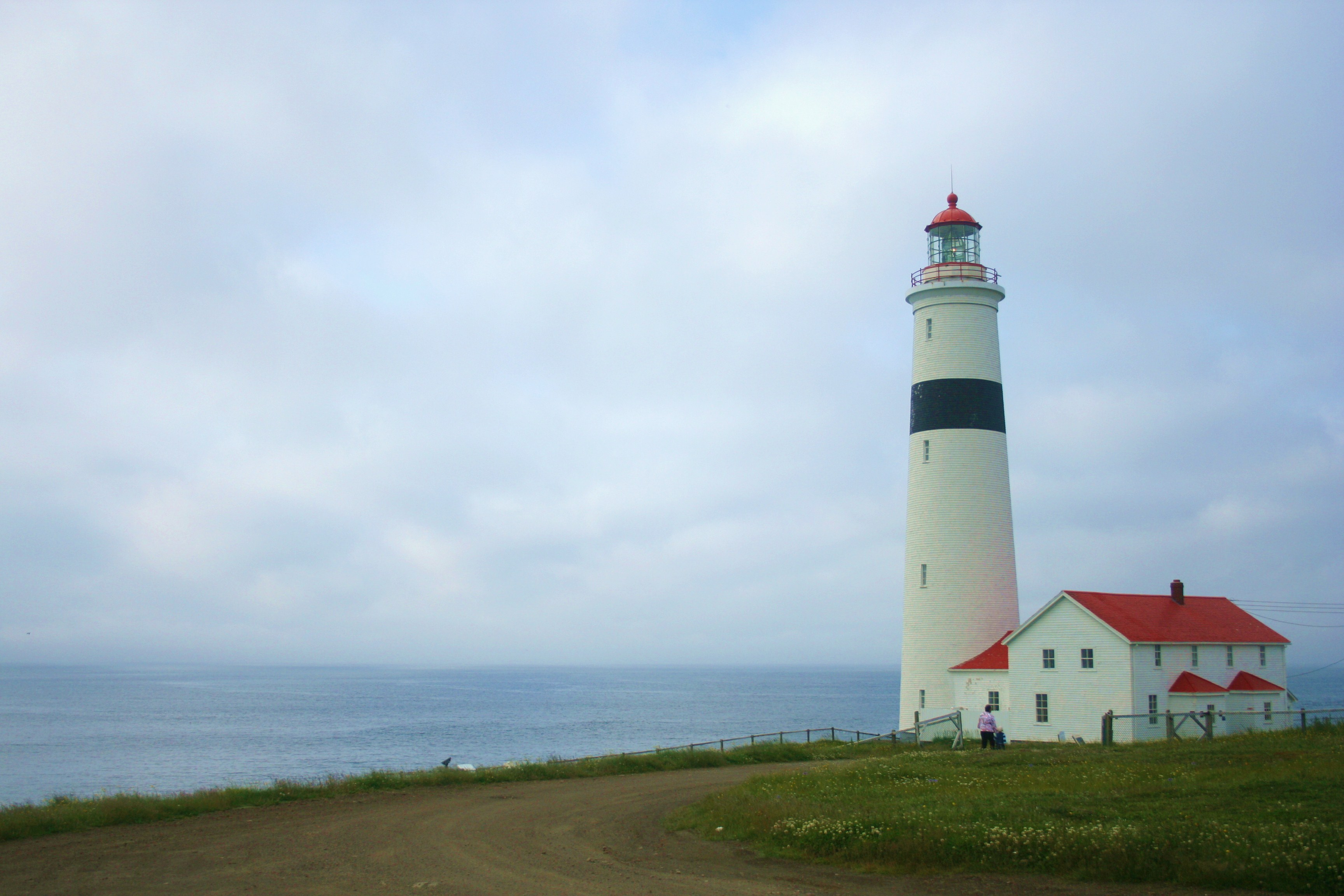
- Point Amour Lighthouse, Forteau Bay
- Interactive map of Strait of Belle Isle
- Location: Newfoundland and Labrador
- Coordinates: 51°30′N 56°30′W
- Type: Strait
- Basin countries: Canada
- Max. length: 125 km (78 mi)
- Min. width: 15 km (9.3 mi)

The Strait of Belle Isle (/bɛl ˈaɪl/ bel EYEL; French: Détroit de Belle Isle [detʁwa d(ə) bɛl il]) is a waterway in eastern Canada, that separates Labrador from the island of Newfoundland, in the province of Newfoundland and Labrador.

== Location ==
The strait is located in the southeast of the Labrador peninsula, it is the northern outlet for the Gulf of St. Lawrence, the other two being the Cabot Strait and Strait of Canso. As such, it is also considered part of the Great Lakes-St. Lawrence Seaway system. The strait is approximately 125 kilometres (80 miles) long and ranges from a maximum width of 60 km (37 mi) to just 15 km (9 mi) at its narrowest, the average width being 18 km (11 mi).

Strait of Belle Isle

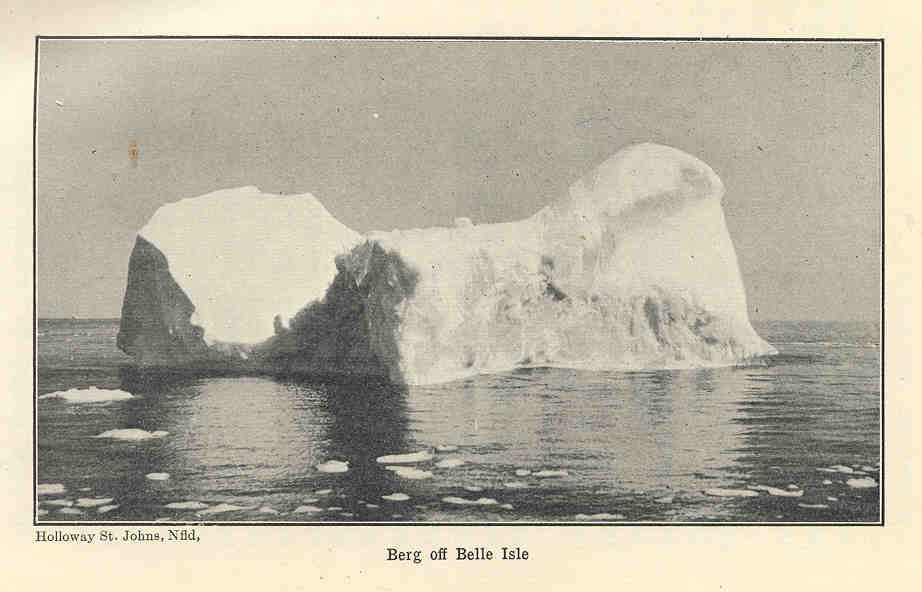
Iceberg 1911

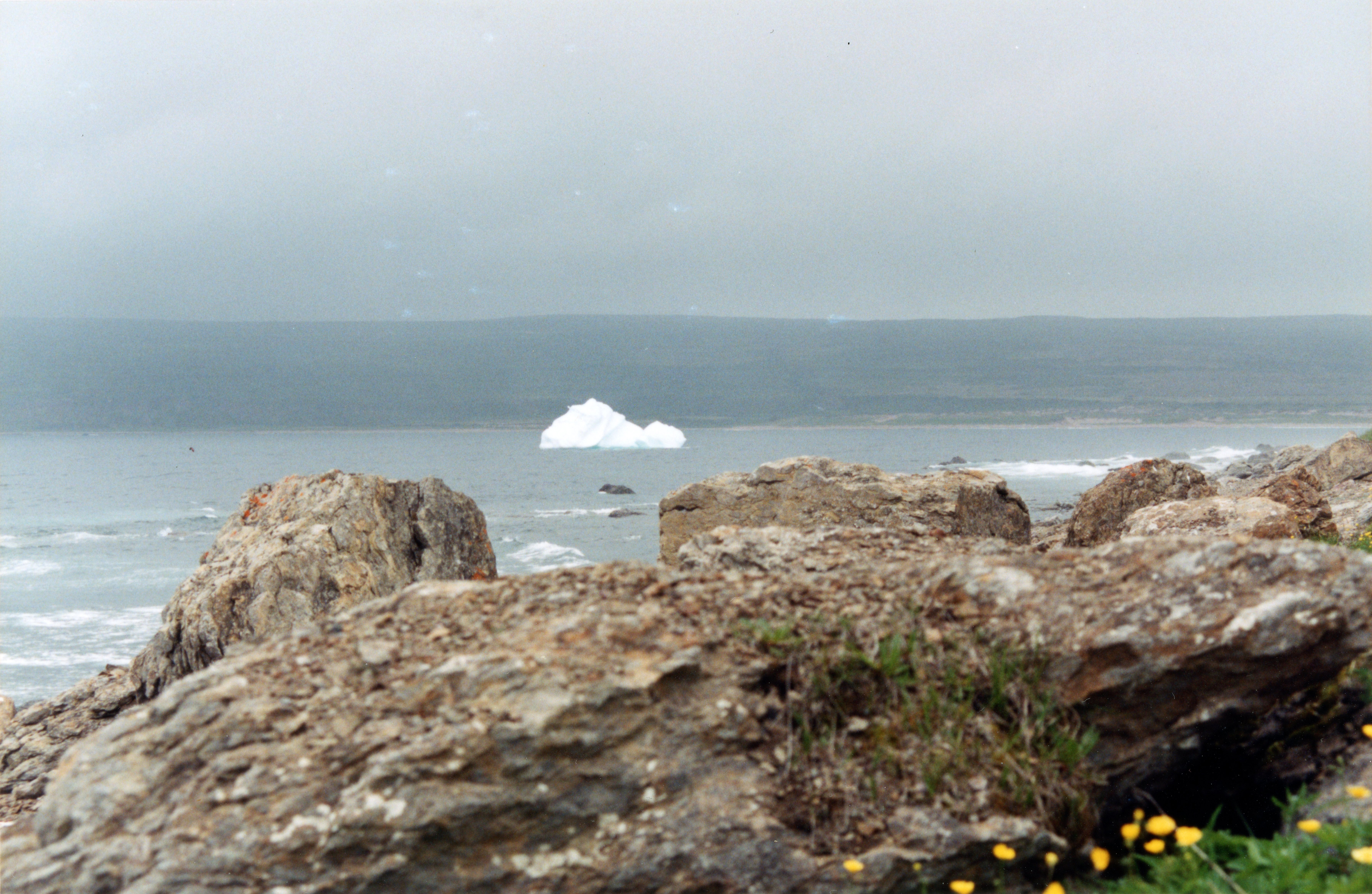
Rocks, iceberg, from L'Anse Amour hamlet

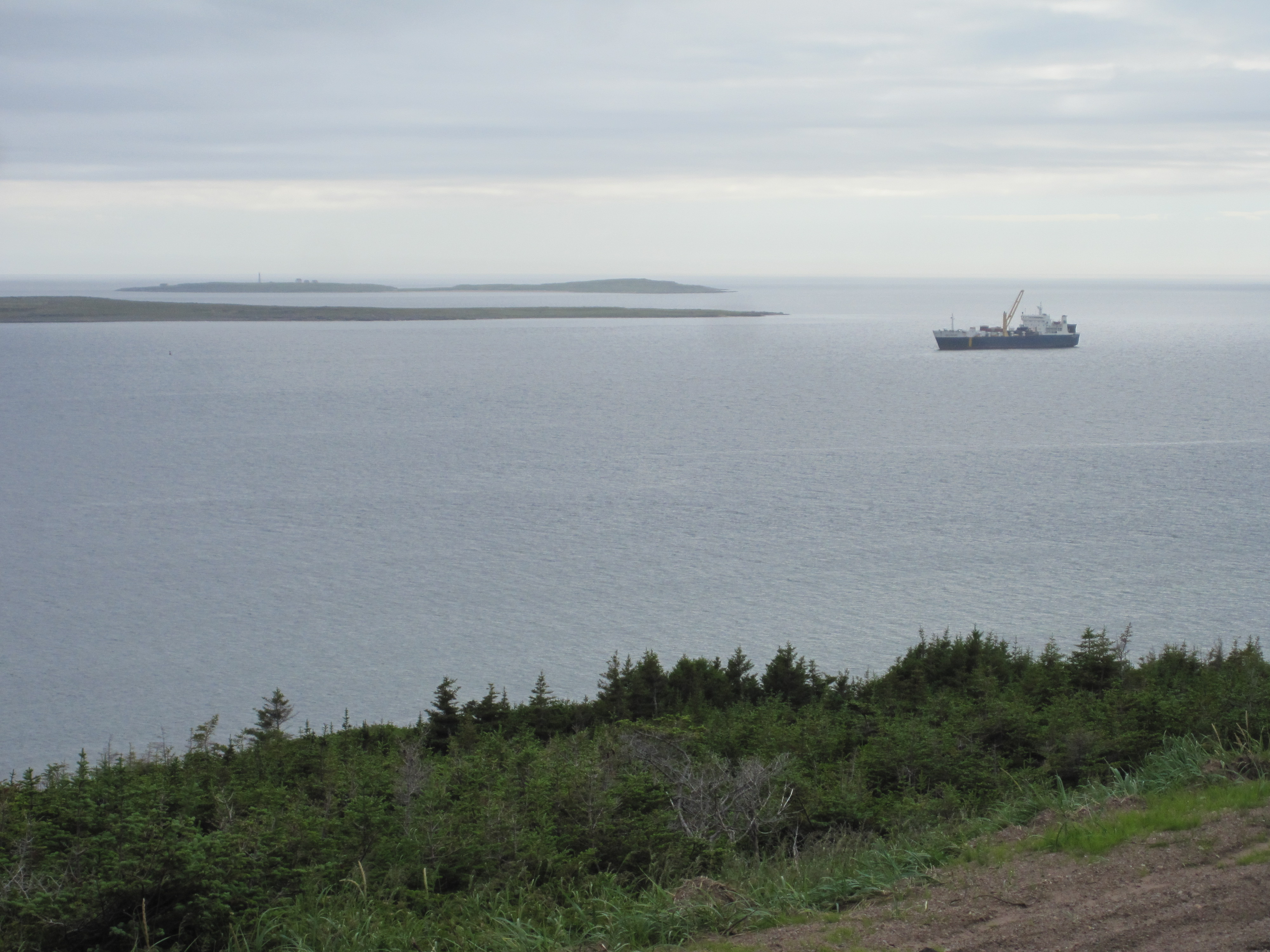
Blanc Sablon Bay, Green Island Cove and Green Island (51° 24′ 10.2″ N - 56° 34′ 36.1″ W) in background

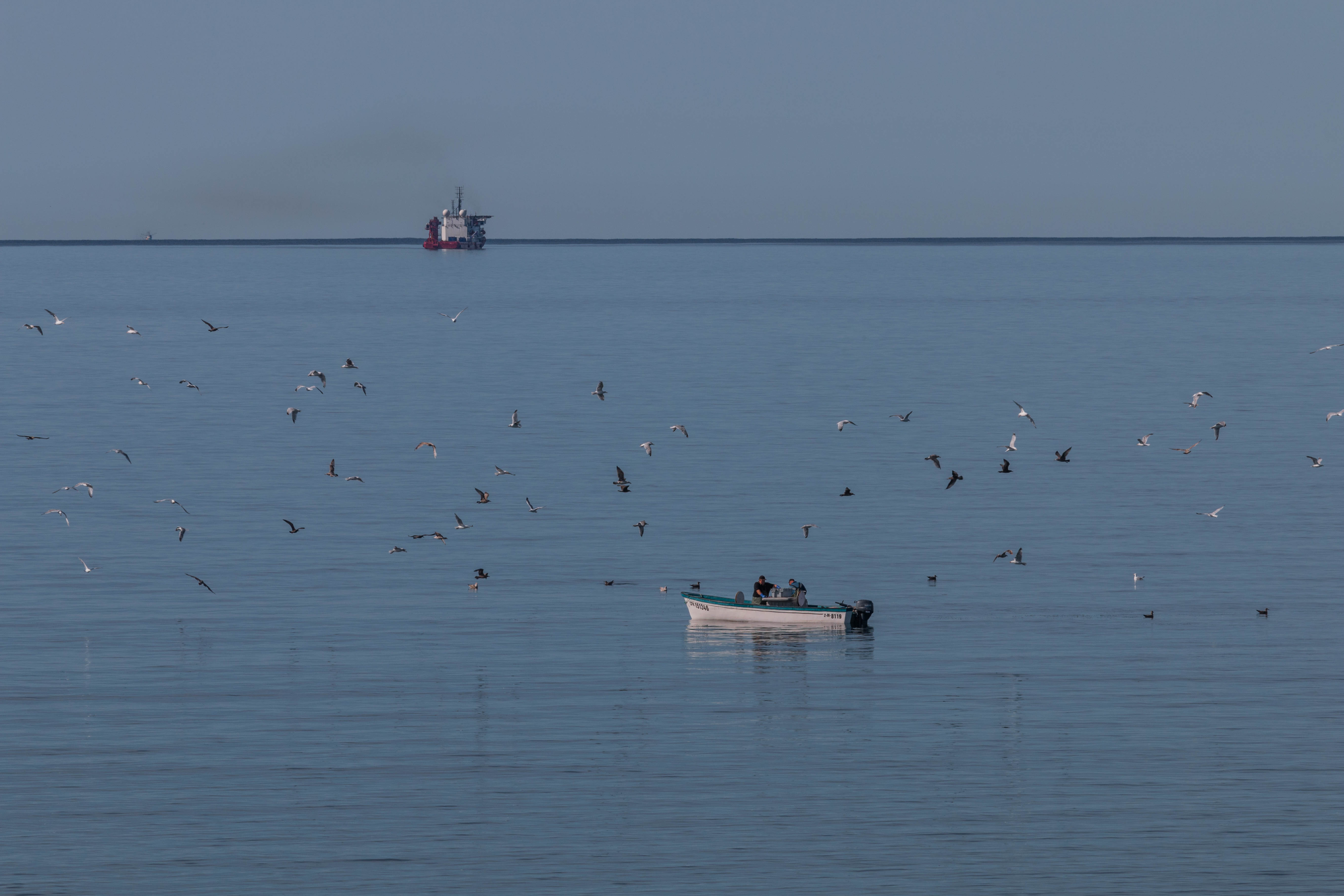
From L'Anse au Loup

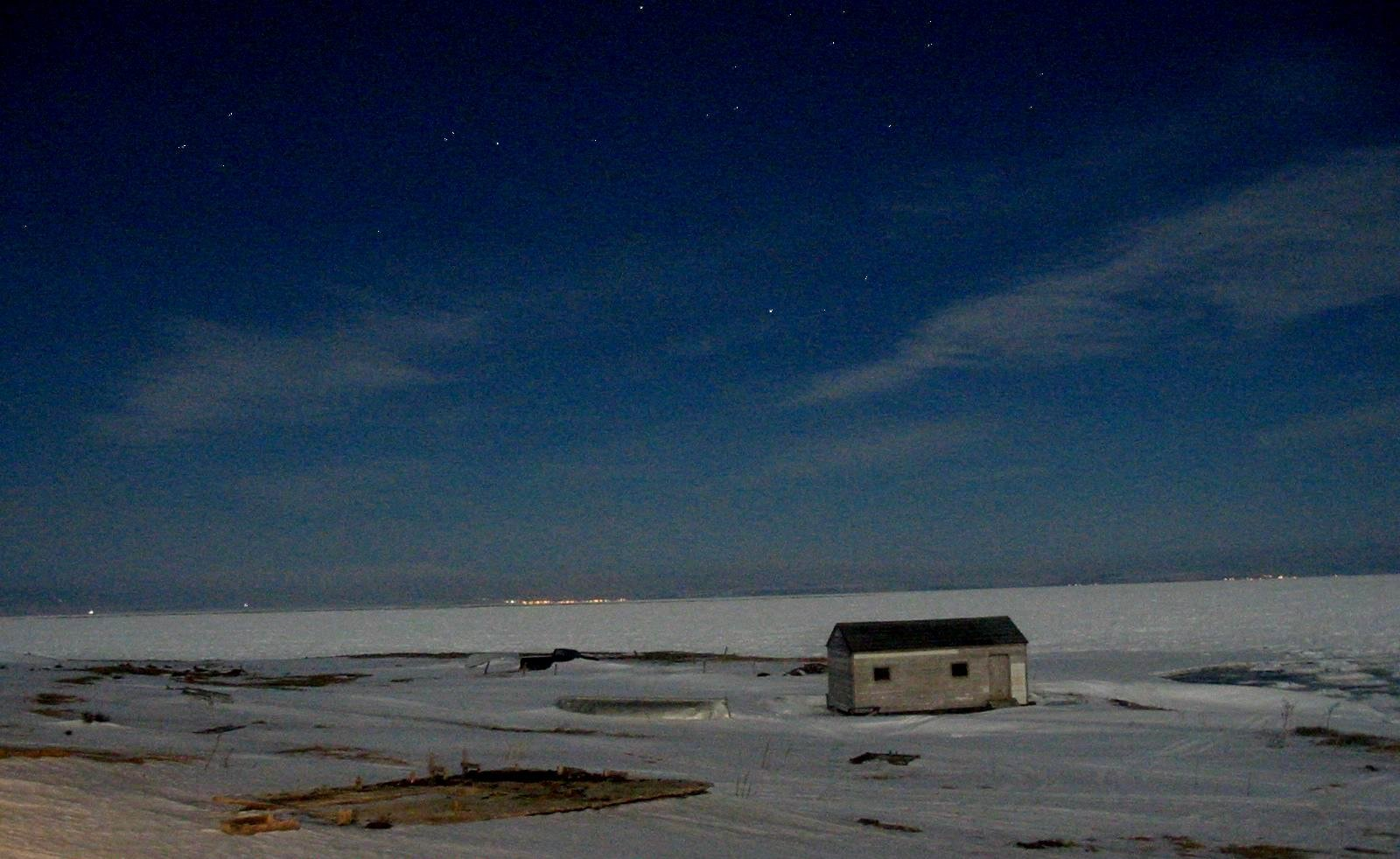
In moonlight, from Green Island Brook, left to right L'Anse Amour light, L'Anse-au-Loup and Capstan Island

== Etymology ==
The name is derived from the island of Belle Isle (French for "Beautiful Island"), which is at the extreme eastern end of the strait and roughly equidistant from Table Head, Labrador, and Cape Bauld, Newfoundland.

== History ==
Both the island of Newfoundland as well as the Labrador region which surrounds the Strait of Belle Isle have been inhabited by Indigenous Peoples for millennia. The surrounding land environment has historically been replete with caribou and other mammals. Harbour seals, grey seals, ringed seals and many other aquatic species are found in the strait itself.

An unnamed manuscript references Viking nomenclature for Labrador and Newfoundland, (Markland and Vinland, respectively), and appears to note the existence of the Strait of Belle Isle: "And if such is the case, then an ocean flows into a strait between Markland and Vínland."

Basque whalers visited the area throughout the 17th century and into the first decade of the 18th century, with the wreckage site of the San Juan at Red Bay dating as early as 1565. Basque seafarers also came into contact with the Inuit, which either led to conflict or collaboration over sealing areas.

== Navigation and transport ==
Navigation in the strait can be extremely hazardous with strong tidal currents interacting with the Labrador Current, depths reaching several hundred metres in places, sea ice for 8 to 10 months of the year, and variable weather conditions including gales and fog. While sea ice prevents year-round shipping, the Canadian Coast Guard maintains a vessel traffic service (VTS) to ensure collisions do not occur. The VTS is voluntary currently.

A ferry service operates at the western part of strait between St. Barbe, Newfoundland, and Blanc Sablon, Quebec. New road construction for the Trans-Labrador Highway resulted in the removal of ferry services to outports in the northeastern part of the strait in 2002.

Marine infrastructure and ferrys

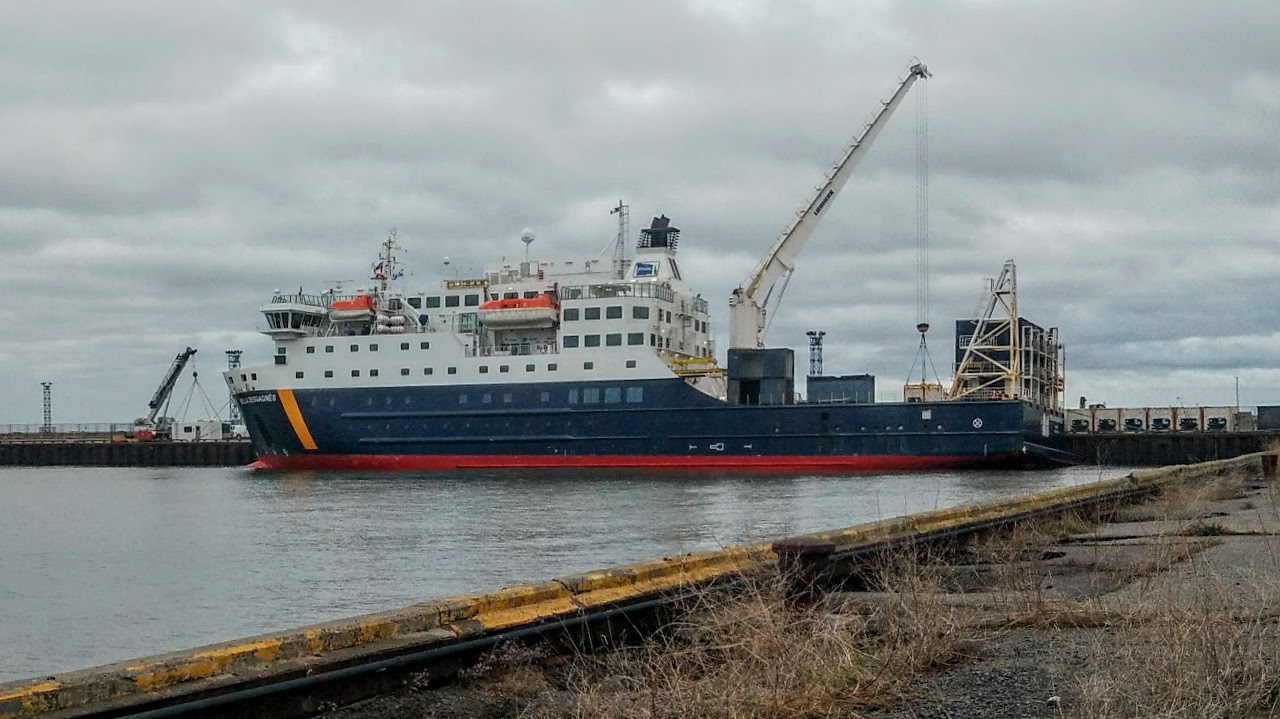
Motor vessel Bella-Desgagnes loading at Rimouski-Est, port, St. Lawrence Estuary, Quebec

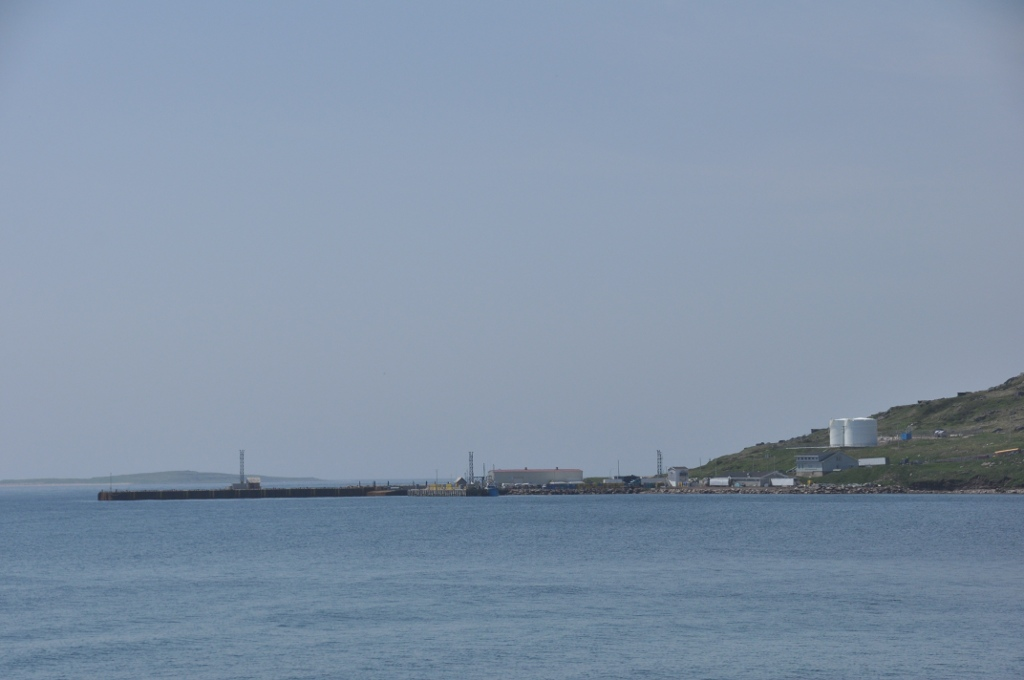
Blanc-Sablon ferry terminal, Blanc-Sablon Bay, Quebec

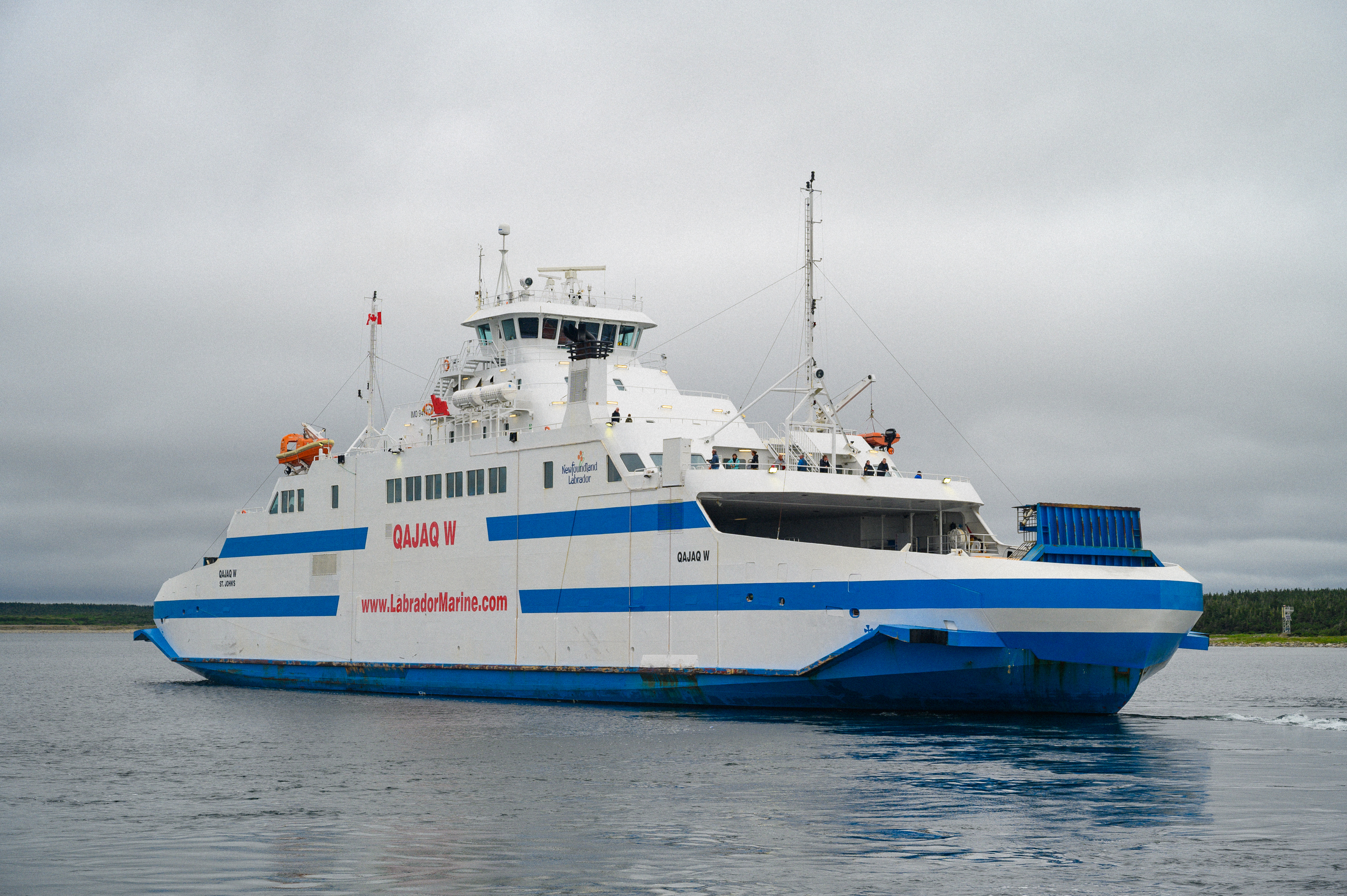
Labrador Marine Roll-on/roll-off cargo, Qajaq W, leaving the terminal at St. Barbe, Newfoundland

=== Fixed link ===
The idea of building a fixed link across the strait between Labrador and Newfoundland, known as the Newfoundland-Labrador fixed link, has been raised numerous times in recent decades following an unsuccessful attempt to build a tunnel carrying electrical wires in the mid-1970s. If such a link were built, it would likely be a 17-kilometre-long (11 mi) submerged rail tunnel. The proposal is meant to reduce the province's reliance upon the Marine Atlantic ferry service to Nova Scotia, but the project's high costs and lack of suitable road network between Labrador and Quebec have been cited as major obstacles.

In 1975, the Progressive Conservative government led by Frank Moores committed to building a tunnel across the strait. A hole was dug on the Labrador side and the government spent $75-million before the project was abandoned.

The October 2003 provincial election resulted in the newly elected Progressive Conservative government announcing joint federal-provincial funding for a study of the concept. A pre-feasibility report was released in February 2005, which concluded that a tunnel bored using tunnel boring machines, with an electric train shuttle to transport vehicles is the most technically and economically attractive option. The estimated construction cost of the fixed link was $1.2 billion (2004$) and total development cost of about $1.7 billion.

In 2016, Premier Dwight Ball launched a new pre-feasibility study to determine the costs of a tunnel link between the island and Labrador. The study released its results in April 2018, and concluded that a 16 km (10 mi) undersea rail tunnel connecting L'Anse Amour in southern Labrador and Yankee Point near Flower's Cove on the Northern Peninsula of Newfoundland could be constructed at a cost of C$1.65 billion.

In their 2019 election platform, the Liberal Party of Canada indicated support for a National Infrastructure Fund, including the Newfoundland-Labrador fixed transportation link, likely linking Yankee Point, Newfoundland with Point Amour on the (Labrador) mainland.

A 35 km (22 mi) submarine cable across the strait is under construction as part of the Lower Churchill Project.
