= North Aulatsivik Island =

- Location within Canada

Geography
- Coordinates: 59°46′01″N 64°04′53″W

Administration
- Canada
- State: Newfoundland and Labrador

Additional information
- Time zone: AST (UTC-4)
  - Summer (DST): ADT (UTC-3)

North Aulatsivik Island is a Canadian island located in northern Labrador, in Newfoundland and Labrador. Its average height above sea level is 289 m (948 ft). It is located within Torngat Mountains National Park.

== See also ==
- South Aulatsivik Island
