= May 2011 Liberal Party of Newfoundland and Labrador leadership election =

- Date: May 27-May 28, 2011
- Convention: Capital Hotel, St. John's
- Resigning leader: Gerry Reid
- Won by: Yvonne Jones
- Ballots: Acclamation
- Candidates: 1
- Entrance fee: $10,000
- Spending limit: N/A

The Liberal Party of Newfoundland and Labrador leadership convention of May 2011 was prompted by Gerry Reid's announcement that he would not lead the Liberal Party of Newfoundland and Labrador to another election, after losing his seat in the 2007 provincial election. The convention was held in May 2011. The winner and lone candidate, Yvonne Jones, lead the party until August 2011, but would not lead the party in to the 2011 provincial election.

The leadership convention was pushed back several times. Originally scheduled for the spring of 2008 it was rescheduled, till the spring of 2010, after no-one expressed an interest in the position and to give the party two years to focus on rebuilding its organization and on its financial situation. In January 2010 Liberal Party President Judy Morrow announced that the leadership convention would be held November 19, 20, and 21, 2010. On July 30, 2010, nominations closed with Yvonne Jones as the only candidate for the party's leadership, causing November's convention to become a policy convention. Due to Jones' battle with breast cancer the convention's date was changed to May 27-May 28, 2011.

== Declared candidates ==
- Yvonne Jones, Member of the House of Assembly (MHA) since 1996 and interim leader since 2007. Her appointment as leader made her the first woman to lead the party. She stated in December 2009 that she would run for the permanent leadership. On July 9, 2010, she officially submitted nomination papers and launched her candidacy.

== Potential candidates who did not run ==
- Roland Butler, MHA since 2001 for Port de Grave and Opposition Critic for six government departments. Butler denied running for the party's leadership when the convention was originally scheduled for October 2008 and announced in April 2010 he would not seek re-election in 2011.
- Peter Dawe, former director of the Newfoundland and Labrador chapter of the Canadian Cancer Society had ruled out running for the leadership of the party in January with plans of running for the federal Liberal Party in the 2011 federal election in the riding of St. John's East. After the appointment of Elizabeth Marshall in February to the Senate he became a provincial candidate in her former riding of Topsail, but on February 22, 2010, he withdrew over medical reasons.
- Dean McDonald, former chair of Newfoundland and Labrador Hydro and business partner of Premier Danny Williams. McDonald declared he would not run for the leadership at this point in time on January 27, 2010.
- Paul Antle, former Liberal Party of Canada candidate in St. John's East and businessman also declared he would not run on January 27, 2010.
- Gerry Byrne, the Liberal MP for Humber-St. Barbe-Baie Verte says he has no interest in running for the leadership of the provincial party saying "In politics, you never say never... (But) that’s a never."
- Danny Dumaresque, former party president, and candidate in the district of Torngat Mountains in the 2007 general election. He was also a MHA for the district of Eagle River from 1989 to 1996. In January he told Transcontinental Media that he is considering running, but would take his time making a decision. On July 29, 2010, he announced he would not run and would instead focus on his business career.
