= Peter Penashue =

Canadian politician (born 1964)

The Honourable Peter Penashue PC

Minister of Intergovernmental Affairs, President of the Queen's Privy Council for Canada
- In office May 18, 2011 – March 14, 2013
- Prime Minister: Stephen Harper
- Preceded by: Josée Verner
- Succeeded by: Denis Lebel

Member of the Canadian Parliament for Labrador
- In office May 30, 2011 – March 14, 2013
- Preceded by: Todd Russell
- Succeeded by: Yvonne Jones

Personal details
- Born: April 9, 1964 (age 62) Sheshatshiu, Newfoundland and Labrador, Canada
- Party: Conservative
- Profession: Innu leader, businessman
- Cabinet: Minister of Intergovernmental Affairs; President of the Queen's Privy Council for Canada
- Website: Official website

Peter Penashue, PC (/pɛˈnæʃweɪ/; born April 9, 1964) is a Canadian politician from Newfoundland and Labrador. He was elected as the Conservative Party of Canada Member of Parliament for the riding of Labrador in the 2011 federal election. Penashue was the first Innu from Labrador to be elected to the House of Commons of Canada and the first Innu cabinet minister in Canadian history. He was also the first centre-right MP to be elected from the riding of Labrador since 1968, and only the second ever to win it since Newfoundland and Labrador joined Canada in 1949.

Following allegations of irregularities in his campaign spending, Penashue announced on March 14, 2013 that he would resign and seek to regain his seat in a by-election. In the resulting by-election, held on May 13, 2013, he was defeated by Yvonne Jones of the Liberal Party. He unsuccessfully ran again in the riding in the 2015 federal election.

== Background ==
Penashue was born in the Innu community of Sheshatshiu, Newfoundland and Labrador. His mother Elizabeth is an author. He attended elementary and secondary school in Sheshatshiu before continuing his education in St. John's, where he graduated from Brother Rice High School and pursued studies at Memorial University of Newfoundland.

Penashue assumed a number of leadership roles in the Labrador Innu community, from Land Claims Director, Executive Director and Financial Administrator with the Naskapi Montagnais Innu to Grand Chief of the Innu Nation.

Penashue was elected President of the Innu Nation at the age of 26. He served as Grand Chief of the Innu Nation, for twelve years, from 1990 to 1997 and 1999 to 2004. Pednashue was also the driving force behind the negotiation of the impacts-benefit agreement between the Innu Nation and the Voisey's Bay Nickel Company. He was also elected to the position of Deputy Grand Chief of the Innu Nation in Sheshatshiu in 2007 and stepped down on March 9, 2010.

== Federal politics ==
Penashue was elected to the House of Commons of Canada in the 2011 Canadian federal election, in the riding of Labrador. Penashue's challenger, Liberal incumbent Todd Russell, had originally been declared by the media as retaining his seat early on election night but after the last five polls were counted Penashue overtook Russell and was ultimately declared the winner. Penashue's original margin of victory of 231 votes was reduced to 79 votes on recount.

Penashue was one of two Innu in Parliament. Jonathan Genest-Jourdain, the New Democratic MP from the neighbouring riding of Manicouagan in Quebec, was the other.

=== Cabinet Minister ===
Penashue was the Minister of Intergovernmental Affairs and President of the Queen's Privy Council for Canada from May 18, 2011 until his resignation on March 14, 2013.

=== 2011 election campaign irregularities, aftermath and post-politics ===
Penashue's campaign took 28 ineligible campaign contributions totaling $27,850 in cash and $18,710 in in-kind contributions from Provincial Airlines for services provided. Elections Canada deemed the contributions ineligible and Penashue's campaign was forced to pay $26,850 on November 28, 2012 and $18,710 on March 4, 2013 to the Receiver General of Canada.

After the 2011 election, the Peneshue campaign had $4,000 but still owed $15,000 from a $25,000 zero interest loan to the Innu Development Limited Partnership, a firm managed by his brother-in-law, Paul Rich. Interest free loans are not allowed by Canadian election law. In November 2012, the Conservative Party transferred $30,000 to the campaign and a further $14,350 on March 1, 2013.

On March 14, 2013, Penashue resigned from Parliament. At the same time, he announced he would seek to return to his old seat via a by-election. In the resulting by-election, held on May 13, 2013, he was defeated by Yvonne Jones of the Liberal Party.

In July 2015, seven companies acknowledged that they made illegal donations to Penashue's 2011 election campaign. Penashue's official agent in the 2011 campaign, Reg Bowers, has been charged with three counts of accepting illegal corporate contributions under the Canada Elections Act. Penashue stated he feels badly for his former official agent.

On September 3, 2015, Penashue was nominated as Conservative candidate in his former riding in the 2015 Canadian federal election, again running against Yvonne Jones. He lost by a margin of over 50% and was pushed into third place.

Penashue later served as one of two Innu Nation representatives on the Independent Expert Advisory Committee examining health concerns surrounding the Muskrat Falls hydroelectric project.

On March 23, 2024, Penashue was arrested in Sheshatshiu after smashing the windows of a vehicle parked outside a home. He said he had bought the house for his son and grandchildren, but that his son, who struggled with addiction, had transferred ownership of the property to other occupants in exchange for cash and cocaine. Penashue was charged with mischief over $5,000, and said his actions were driven by frustration that the RCMP had not acted on his complaints about drug activity at the property. In January 2025, the Crown withdrew the mischief charge after Penashue agreed to a year-long peace bond requiring him to keep the peace and stay away from the complainant. Speaking in provincial court in Happy Valley-Goose Bay, Penashue said his actions had been driven by desperation and anger over the difficulty his family and others in Sheshatshiu faced in escaping drug activity in the community.

== Electoral history ==
2015 Canadian federal election
Party	Candidate	Votes	%	±%	Expenditures
Liberal	Yvonne Jones	8,878	71.75	+23.76	–
New Democratic	Edward Rudkowski	1,779	14.38	–4.81	–
Conservative	Peter Penashue	1,716	13.87	–18.53	–
Total valid votes/Expense limit		12,373	100.0		$204,293.51
Total rejected ballots		53	0.43	–0.42	
Turnout		12,426	62.39	+4.40	
Eligible voters		19,917			
Liberal hold		Swing		+14.28	
Source: Elections Canada

Canadian federal by-election, 13 May 2013: Labrador Resignation of Peter Penashue, 14 March 2013
Party	Candidate	Votes	%	±%	Expenditures
Liberal	Yvonne Jones	5,812	47.99	+8.92	$76,859.63
Conservative	Peter Penashue	3,924	32.40	−7.41	$70,866.91
New Democratic	Harry Borlase	2,324	19.19	−0.64	$81,475.53
Libertarian	Norman Andrews	50	0.41		$236.16
Total valid votes/expense limit		12,110	100.0	–	$ 89,852.84
Total rejected, declined and unmarked ballots		27	0.22	−0.26	
Turnout		12,137	59.93	+6.49	
Eligible voters		20,251			
Liberal gain from Conservative		Swing		+8.17	
Source: "By-election May 13, 2013". Elections Canada. May 13, 2013.

2011 Canadian federal election: Labrador
Party	Candidate	Votes	%	±%	Expenditures
Conservative	Peter Penashue	4,256	39.81	+31.84	$89,997.05
Liberal	Todd Russell	4,177	39.07	−31.21	$30,016.49
New Democratic	Jacob Larkin	2,120	19.83	+1.98	$29,968.41
Green	George C.R. Barrett	139	1.30	−2.61	$0.00
Total valid votes/expense limit		10,692	100.0	–	$84,468.09
Total rejected, declined and unmarked ballots		52	0.48	−0.37	
Turnout		10,744	52.91	+14.31	
Eligible voters		20,305			
Conservative gain from Liberal		Swing		+31.52	
Conservative candidate Peter Penashue was found to have spent above the mandated expense limit, precipitating his resignation and subsequent by-election.

28th Canadian Ministry (2006–2015) – Cabinet of Stephen Harper
Cabinet posts (2)
Predecessor	Office	Successor
Josée Verner	President of the Privy Council; 2011–2013	Denis Lebel
Josée Verner	Minister of Intergovernmental Affairs; 2011–2013	Denis Lebel
