= L'Anse-au-Loup =

L'Anse-au-Loup Wolf Cove
- Town
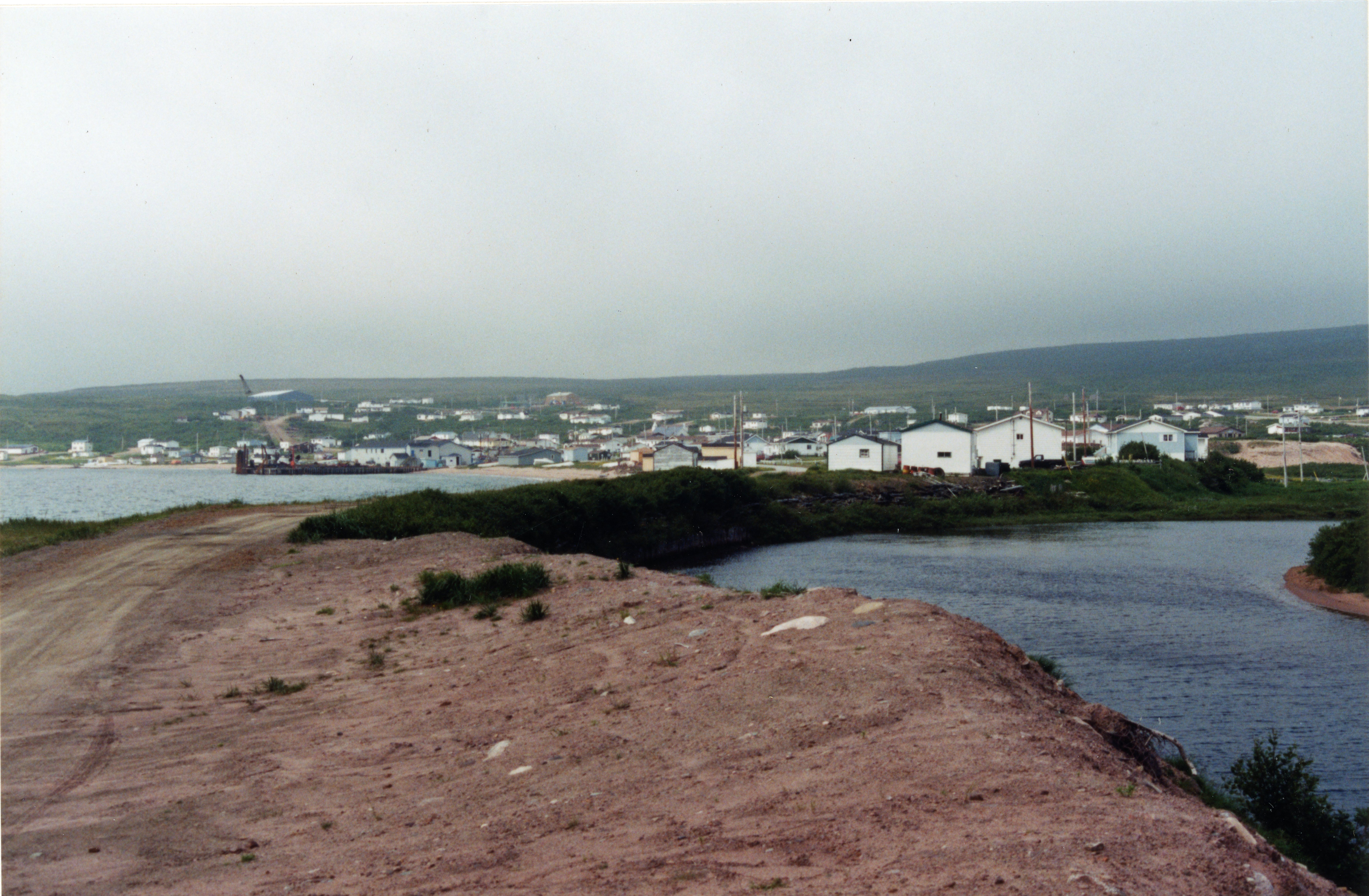
- Harbour installations, Strait of Belle Isle, Anse-au-Loup Brook

- L'Anse-au-Loup, Newfoundland & Labrador L'Anse-au-Loup (Canada)
- Coordinates: 51°31′33″N 56°50′01″W
- Country: Canada
- Province: Newfoundland and Labrador

Area
  - Land: 3.48 km^{2} (1.34 sq mi)

Population (2021)
  - Total: 692
  - Density: 160.5/km^{2} (416/sq mi)
- Time zone: UTC-3:30 (Newfoundland Time)
  - Summer (DST): UTC-2:30 (Newfoundland Daylight)
- Area code: 709
- Highways: Route 510 (Trans-Labrador Highway)

L'Anse-au-Loup (Town) is located on the banks of L'Anse-au-Loup Brook and the Strait of Belle Isle, in Newfoundland and Labrador province, Canada.

== History ==
In Quebec-Labrador Peninsula, on the north shore of the Strait of Belle Isle, radiocarbon dating of archaeological sites leads geologists and archaeologists to date the presence of humans around 9,000 years ago, i.e. after the retreat of the ice from the last glaciation.

After the glaciation, Newfoundland and Labrador was perhaps the last place to be populated by human groups. Small spear or dart points from Prince Edward Island are very similar to early artifacts found on the north shore of the Strait of Belle Isle. Archaeologists do not believe in coincidence, they rather put forward the thesis that the first Labradorians crossed the St. Lawrence River, travel East along the Lower North Shore, until arriving in Quebec-Labrador Peninsula, to end up settling there.

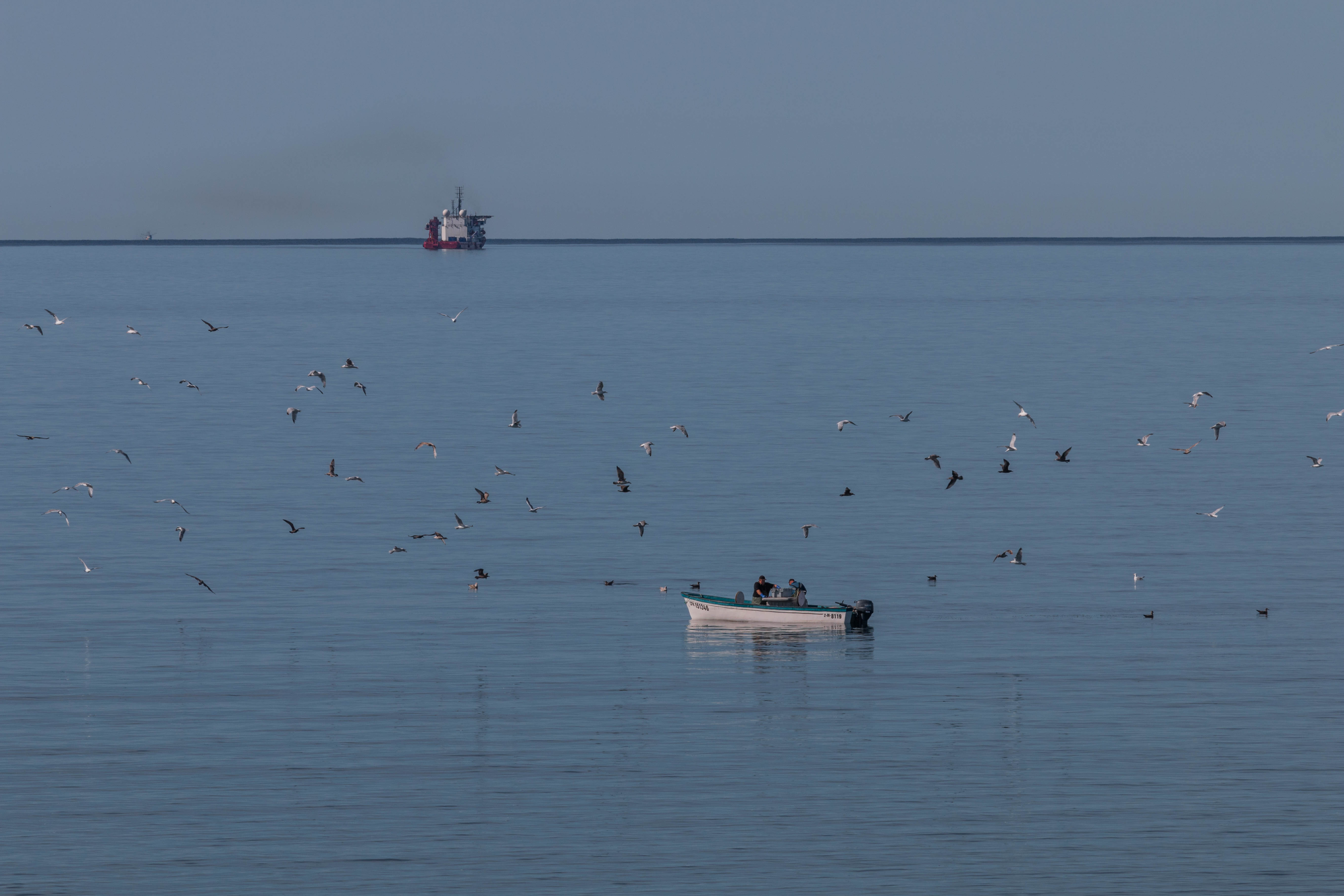
Strait of Belle Isle, from L'Anse-au-Loup

So, the coasts of the Strait of Belle Isle, like those of Labrador, of which it is a part, have been populated for a very long time. Labrador is said to be the Markland of the Viking sagas, which probably describes the silver beaches of Groswater Bay. Long before the explorations of Jacques Cartier, Basque fishermen hunted whales on the northeast coast of the Strait of Belle-Île, in Red Bay.

Located on the banks of L'Anse-au-Loup Brook and the Strait of Belle Isle, along the Trans-Labrador Highway (Route 510), the town of l'Anse-au-Loup has been part of the history of the Labrador fishery, the whaling and cod fishing industry, the disputes between the governments of Quebec, as well as the establishment of permanent communities. Rooted between Forteau and L'Anse-au-Diable, the town was incorporated in 1975, the first mayor was Reginald O'Brien Sr.

== Demographics ==
In the 2021 Census of Population conducted by Statistics Canada, L'Anse au Loup had a population of 692 residing in 302 of its 322 total private dwellings, a change of 24% from its 2016 population of 558. With a land area of 3.39 km^{2} (1.31 sq mi), it had a population density of 204.1/km^{2} (528.7/sq mi) in 2021.

== See also ==
- List of cities and towns in Newfoundland and Labrador
- L'Anse-au-Loup official Web site (Wolf Cove), Newfoundland and Labrador
