= By-elections to the 27th Canadian Parliament =

By-elections to the 27th Canadian Parliament were held to fill vacancies in the House of Commons of Canada between the 1965 federal election and the 1968 federal election. The Liberal Party of Canada led a minority government for the entirety of the 27th Canadian Parliament, with little change from by-elections.

Seventeen seats became vacant during the life of the Parliament. Eleven of these vacancies were filled through by-elections, and six seats remained vacant when the 1968 federal election was called.

By-election	Date	Incumbent	Party	Winner	Party	Cause	Retained
Jasper—Edson	November 6, 1967	Hugh Horner	Progressive Conservative	Douglas Caston	Progressive Conservative	Resignation	Yes
Bonavista—Twillingate	November 6, 1967	Jack Pickersgill	Liberal	Charles Ronald Granger	Liberal	Resignation	Yes
Colchester—Hants	November 6, 1967	Cyril Kennedy	Progressive Conservative	Robert L. Stanfield	Progressive Conservative	Resignation to provide a seat for Stanfield	Yes
Sudbury	May 29, 1967	Rodger Mitchell	Liberal	Bud Germa	New Democratic	Death	No
Hull	May 29, 1967	Alexis Caron	Liberal	Pierre Caron	Liberal	Death	Yes
Outremont—St-Jean	May 29, 1967	Maurice Lamontagne	Liberal	Aurélien Noël	Liberal	Resignation	Yes
Papineau	May 29, 1967	Guy Favreau	Liberal	André Ouellet	Liberal	Appointed as a Justice of the Quebec Superior Court	Yes
Richelieu—Verchères	May 29, 1967	Lucien Cardin	Liberal	Jacques-R. Tremblay	Liberal	Resignation	Yes
Burin—Burgeo	September 19, 1966	Chesley W. Carter	Liberal	Don Jamieson	Liberal	Called to the Senate	Yes
Grand Falls—White Bay—Labrador	September 19, 1966	Charles Ronald Granger	Liberal	Andrew Chatwood	Liberal	Resignation	Yes
Nicolet—Yamaska	September 19, 1966	Clément Vincent	Progressive Conservative	Florian Coté	Liberal	Resignation	No

== See also ==
- List of federal by-elections in Canada

== Sources ==
- Parliament of Canada–Elected in By-Elections
