= 27th Canadian Parliament =

1966–68 legislative term

- Minority parliament
- Jan. 18, 1966 – Apr. 23, 1968

Parliament leaders
- Prime minister: Rt. Hon. Lester B. Pearson; Apr. 22, 1963 – Apr. 20, 1968
- Rt. Hon. Pierre Trudeau; Apr. 20, 1968 – Jun. 4, 1979
- Cabinets: 19th Canadian Ministry; 20th Canadian Ministry
- Leader of the Opposition: John Diefenbaker; April 22, 1963 – September 9, 1967
- Michael Starr; September 9, 1967 – November 6, 1967
- Robert Stanfield; November 6, 1967 – February 21, 1976

Party caucuses
- Government: Liberal Party
- Opposition: Progressive Conservative Party
- Recognized: New Democratic Party
- Unrecognized: Ralliement créditiste
- Social Credit Party

House of Commons
- Seating arrangements of the House of Commons
- Speaker of the Commons: Lucien Lamoureux; January 18, 1966 – September 29, 1974
- Government House leader: George McIlraith; October 30, 1964 – May 3, 1967
- Allan MacEachen; May 3, 1967 – April 23, 1968
- Opposition House leader: Michael Starr; April 22, 1965 – April 23, 1968
- Members: 265 MP seats List of members

Senate
- Speaker of the Senate: Sydney John Smith; January 7, 1966 – September 5, 1968
- Government Senate leader: John Joseph Connolly; February 3, 1964 – April 20, 1968
- Paul Martin Sr. April 20, 1968 – October 30, 1974
- Opposition Senate leader: Alfred Johnson Brooks; April 22, 1963 – October 31, 1967
- Jacques Flynn; October 31, 1967 – June 4, 1979
- Senators: 102 senator seats List of senators

Sovereign
- Monarch: Elizabeth II; 6 February 1952 – 8 September 2022
- Governor general: Georges Vanier; 15 September 1959 – 5 March 1967
- Roland Michener; 17 April 1967 – 14 January 1974

Sessions
- 1st session January 18, 1966 – May 8, 1967
- 2nd session May 8, 1967 – April 23, 1968
← 26th	→ 28th

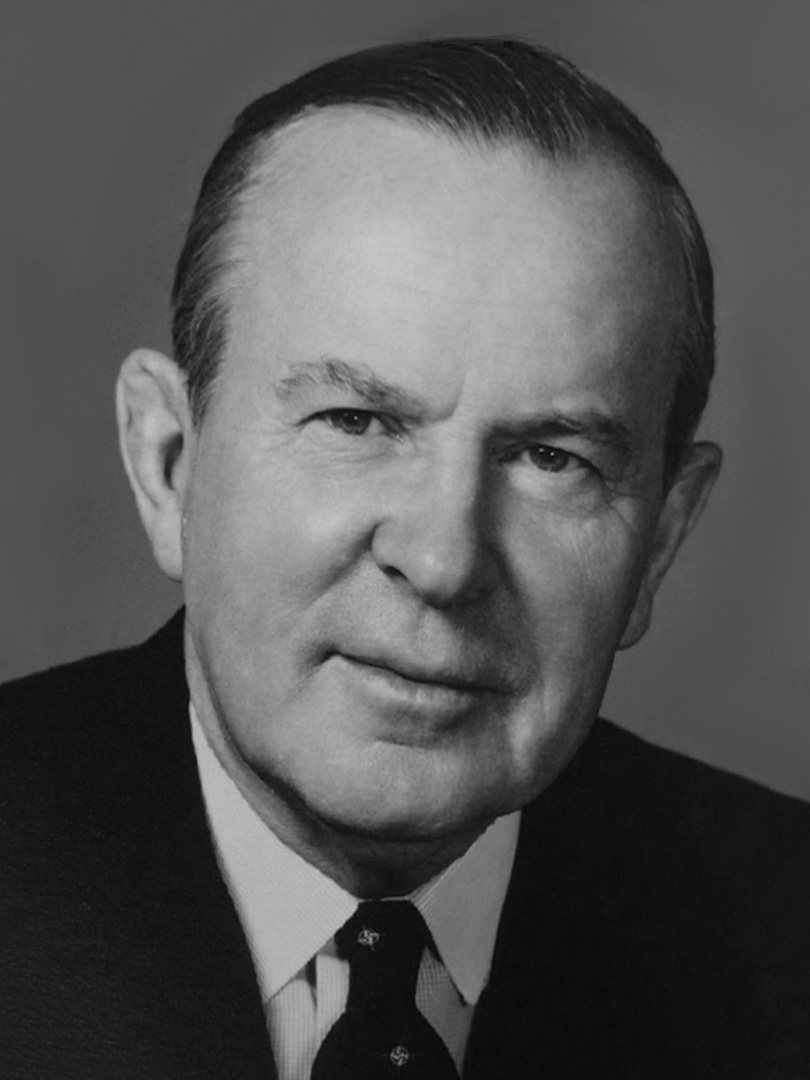
Lester B. Pearson was Prime Minister during the 27th Canadian Parliament.

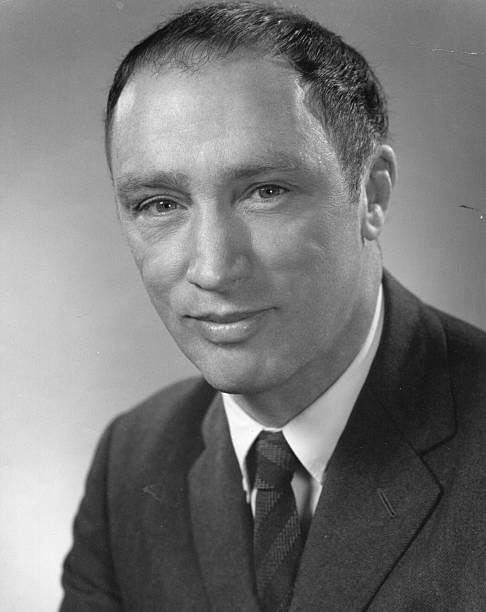
Pierre Trudeau was Prime Minister during the last few days of the 27th Canadian Parliament.

The 27th Canadian Parliament was in session from January 18, 1966 until April 23, 1968. The membership was set by the 1965 federal election on November 8, 1965, and it changed only somewhat due to resignations and by-elections until it was dissolved prior to the 1968 election.

There were two sessions of the 27th Parliament:

Session	Start	End
1st	January 18, 1966	May 8, 1967
2nd	May 8, 1967	April 23, 1968

== Overview ==
It was controlled by a Liberal Party minority under Prime Minister Lester B. Pearson and the 19th Canadian Ministry. Pierre Trudeau succeeded Pearson as party leader and Prime Minister shortly before this Parliament ended for the 1968 national election.

The Official Opposition was the Progressive Conservative Party, led first by John Diefenbaker, and subsequently by Michael Starr as interim leader until the election of Robert Stanfield as Progressive Conservative party leader.

Most of the MPs were elected as the single member for their district. Two represented Queen's (PEI) and two represented Halifax.

== Party standings ==
=== Distribution of seats at the beginning of the 27th Parliament ===
Party	Party Leader	Seats			
Party	Party Leader	1963	Dissolution	Elected	% Change
Liberal	Lester Pearson	128	128	131	+2.3%
Progressive Conservative	John Diefenbaker	93	95	97	+4.3%
New Democratic	Tommy Douglas	24	17	21	-12.5%
Ralliement créditiste	Réal Caouette			9	
Social Credit	R.N. Thompson	17	24	5	-70.6%
Independent			-	1	
Total		265	265	265	
Sources: http://www.elections.ca History of Federal Ridings since 1867

Notes:

"% change" refers to change from previous election ^{1} "Previous" refers to the results of the previous election, not the party standings in the House of Commons prior to dissolution.

== Major events ==
=== Pearson's retirement ===
On December 14th, 1967 Prime Minister Pearson announce that he would be retiring from politics. He remained in office until April 20, 1968, at which point Pierre Trudeau assumed the leadership of the country.

== Ministry ==
The 19th Canadian Ministry began at the beginning of the 26th Canadian Parliament and lasted until near the end of the 27th Canadian Parliament. The 20th Canadian Ministry began near the end of the 27th Canadian Parliament and governed throughout the 28th Canadian Parliament, 29th Canadian Parliament, and 30th Canadian Parliament.

== Officeholders ==
=== Head of State ===
Office	Photo	Name	Assumed office	Left office
Sovereign		Elizabeth II	February 6, 1952	September 8, 2022
Governor General		Georges Vanier	September 15, 1959	March 5, 1967
Governor General		Roland Michener	April 17, 1967	January 14, 1974

=== Party leadership ===
Party	Photo	Name	Assumed office	Left office
Liberal		Lester B. Pearson	January 16, 1958	April 6, 1968
Liberal		Pierre Trudeau	April 6, 1968	June 16, 1984
Progressive Conservative		John Diefenbaker	April 22, 1963	September 8, 1967
Progressive Conservative		Michael Starr	September 9, 1967	November 6, 1967
Progressive Conservative		Robert Stanfield	November 6, 1967	February 21, 1976
New Democratic		Tommy Douglas	August 3, 1961	April 24, 1971
Ralliement créditiste		Réal Caouette	September 1, 1963	October 9, 1971
Social Credit		R.N. Thompson	July 7, 1961	March 9, 1967
Social Credit		Alexander Bell Patterson	March 1967	June 1968

=== House of Commons ===
==== Presiding officer ====
Office	Photo	Officer	Riding	Assumed office	Left office	Party
Speaker of the House of Commons		Lucien Lamoureux	Stormont—Dundas	January 18, 1966	September 29, 1974	Liberal

==== Government leadership (Liberal) ====
Office	Photo	Officer	Riding	Assumed office	Left office
Prime Minister		Lester B. Pearson	Algoma East	April 22, 1963	April 20, 1968
Prime Minister		Pierre Trudeau	Mount Royal	April 20, 1968	June 4, 1979
Prime Minister		Pierre Trudeau	Mount Royal	March 3, 1980	June 30, 1984
House Leader		George McIlraith	Ottawa West	October 30, 1964	May 3, 1967
House Leader		Allan MacEachen	Cape Breton Highlands—Canso	May 3, 1967	April 23, 1968
Whip		Bernard Pilon	Chambly—Rouville	1966	November 17, 1970

== Changes to party standings ==
=== Timeline ===
Number of members per party	General Election	By-elections		
Number of members per party	Nov. 8, 1965	Sep. 10, 1966	May 29, 1967	Nov. 6, 1967
Liberal	131	▲1	▼1	
Progressive Conservative	97	▼1		
New Democratic	21		▲1	
Ralliement créditiste	9			
Social Credit	5			
Independent	1			
Total Seats	265			

=== House of Commons ===
==== By-elections ====
By-election	Date	Incumbent	Party	Winner	Party	Cause	Retained
Jasper—Edson	November 6, 1967	Hugh Horner	Progressive Conservative	Douglas Caston	Progressive Conservative	Resignation	Yes
Bonavista—Twillingate	November 6, 1967	Jack Pickersgill	Liberal	Charles Ronald Granger	Liberal	Resignation	Yes
Colchester—Hants	November 6, 1967	Cyril Kennedy	Progressive Conservative	Robert L. Stanfield	Progressive Conservative	Resignation to provide a seat for Stanfield	Yes
Sudbury	May 29, 1967	Rodger Mitchell	Liberal	Bud Germa	New Democratic	Death	No
Hull	May 29, 1967	Alexis Caron	Liberal	Pierre Caron	Liberal	Death	Yes
Outremont—St-Jean	May 29, 1967	Maurice Lamontagne	Liberal	Aurélien Noël	Liberal	Resignation	Yes
Papineau	May 29, 1967	Guy Favreau	Liberal	André Ouellet	Liberal	Appointed as a Justice of the Quebec Superior Court	Yes
Richelieu—Verchères	May 29, 1967	Lucien Cardin	Liberal	Jacques-R. Tremblay	Liberal	Resignation	Yes
Burin—Burgeo	September 19, 1966	Chesley W. Carter	Liberal	Don Jamieson	Liberal	Called to the Senate	Yes
Grand Falls—White Bay—Labrador	September 19, 1966	Charles Ronald Granger	Liberal	Andrew Chatwood	Liberal	Resignation	Yes
Nicolet—Yamaska	September 19, 1966	Clément Vincent	Progressive Conservative	Florian Coté	Liberal	Resignation	No

== Parliamentarians ==
=== House of Commons ===
Following is a full list of members of the twenty-seventh Parliament listed first by province or territory, then by electoral district.

Key:

- Party leaders are italicized.
- Parliamentary secretaries is indicated by "‡".
- Cabinet ministers are in **boldface**.
- The Prime Minister is **both**.
- The Speaker is indicated by "(†)".

Electoral districts denoted by an asterisk (*) indicates that district was represented by two members.

==== Alberta ====
Electoral district	Name	Party	First elected/previously elected	No. of terms
Acadia	Jack Horner	Progressive Conservative	1958	4th term
Athabaska	Jack Bigg	Progressive Conservative	1958	4th term
Battle River—Camrose	Clifford Smallwood	Progressive Conservative	1958	4th term
Bow River	Eldon Woolliams	Progressive Conservative	1958	4th term
Calgary North	Douglas Harkness	Progressive Conservative	1945	8th term
Calgary South	Harold Raymond Ballard	Progressive Conservative	1965	1st term
Edmonton East	William Skoreyko	Progressive Conservative	1958	4th term
Edmonton—Strathcona	Terry Nugent	Progressive Conservative	1958	4th term
Edmonton West	Marcel Lambert	Progressive Conservative	1957	5th term
Jasper—Edson	Hugh Horner (resigned 9 May 1967)	Progressive Conservative	1958	4th term
Jasper—Edson	Douglas Caston (by-election of 1967-11-06)	Progressive Conservative	1967	1st term
Lethbridge	Deane Gundlock	Progressive Conservative	1958	4th term
Macleod	Lawrence Kindt	Progressive Conservative	1958	4th term
Medicine Hat	Bud Olson	Social Credit	1957, 1962	4th term*
Medicine Hat	Bud Olson	Liberal	1957, 1962	4th term*
Peace River	Ged Baldwin	Progressive Conservative	1958	4th term
Red Deer	Robert N. Thompson	Social Credit	1962	3rd term
Red Deer	Robert N. Thompson	Progressive Conservative	1962	3rd term
Vegreville	Frank Fane	Progressive Conservative	1958	4th term
Wetaskiwin	Harry Andrew Moore	Progressive Conservative	1962	3rd term

==== British Columbia ====
Electoral district	Name	Party	First elected/previously elected	No. of terms
Burnaby—Coquitlam	Tommy Douglas	New Democratic	1935, (Note: Weyburn (Saskatchewan)) 1962	5th term*
Burnaby—Richmond	Bob Prittie	New Democratic	1962	3rd term
Cariboo	Bert Leboe	Social Credit	1953, 1962	5th term*
Coast—Capilano	**John (Jack) Davis** ‡	Liberal	1962	3rd term
Comox—Alberni	Thomas Speakman Barnett	New Democratic	1953, 1962	5th term*
Esquimalt—Saanich	George Chatterton	Progressive Conservative	1961	4th term
Fraser Valley	Alexander Bell Patterson	Social Credit	1953, 1962	5th term*
Kamloops	E. Davie Fulton	Progressive Conservative	1945, 1965	7th term*
Kootenay East	Jim Byrne	Liberal	1949, 1962	6th term*
Kootenay West	Herbert Wilfred Herridge	New Democratic	1945	8th term
Nanaimo—Cowichan—The Islands	Colin Cameron	New Democratic	1953, 1962	5th term*
New Westminster	Barry Mather	New Democratic	1962	3rd term
Okanagan Boundary	David Vaughan Pugh	Progressive Conservative	1958	4th term
Okanagan—Revelstoke	Howard Earl Johnston	Social Credit	1965	1st term
Skeena	Frank Howard	New Democratic	1957	5th term
Vancouver—Burrard	Ron Basford	Liberal	1963	2nd term
Vancouver Centre	**John Robert (Jack) Nicholson**	Liberal	1962	3rd term
Vancouver East	Harold Winch	New Democratic	1953	6th term
Vancouver Kingsway	Grace MacInnis	New Democratic	1965	1st term
Vancouver Quadra	Grant Deachman	Liberal	1963	2nd term
Vancouver South	**Arthur Laing**	Liberal	1949, 1962	4th term*
Victoria	David Groos	Liberal	1963	2nd term

==== Manitoba ====
Electoral district	Name	Party	First elected/previously elected	No. of terms
Brandon—Souris	Walter Dinsdale	Progressive Conservative	1951	7th term
Churchill	Robert Simpson	Progressive Conservative	1957	5th term
Dauphin	Elmer Forbes	Progressive Conservative	1958	4th term
Lisgar	George Muir	Progressive Conservative	1957	5th term
Marquette	Nick Mandziuk	Progressive Conservative	1957	5th term
Portage—Neepawa	Siegfried Enns	Progressive Conservative	1962	3rd term
Provencher	Warner Jorgenson	Progressive Conservative	1957	5th term
Selkirk	Eric Stefanson Sr.	Progressive Conservative	1958	4th term
Springfield	Edward Schreyer	New Democratic	1965	1st term
St. Boniface	**Roger Teillet**	Liberal	1962	3rd term
Winnipeg North	David Orlikow	New Democratic	1962	3rd term
Winnipeg North Centre	Stanley Knowles	New Democratic	1942, 1962	8th term*
Winnipeg South	Louis Ralph (Bud) Sherman	Progressive Conservative	1965	1st term
Winnipeg South Centre	Gordon Churchill	Progressive Conservative	1951	7th term
Winnipeg South Centre	Gordon Churchill	Independent Progressive Conservative	1951	7th term

==== New Brunswick ====
Electoral district	Name	Party	First elected/previously elected	No. of terms
Charlotte	Allan M.A. McLean	Liberal	1962	3rd term
Gloucester	**Hédard Robichaud**	Liberal	1953	6th term
Kent	Guy Crossman	Liberal	1962	3rd term
Northumberland—Miramichi	George Roy McWilliam	Liberal	1949	7th term
Restigouche—Madawaska	Jean-Eudes Dubé	Liberal	1962	3rd term
Royal	Gordon Fairweather	Progressive Conservative	1962	3rd term
St. John—Albert	Thomas Miller Bell	Progressive Conservative	1953	6th term
Victoria—Carleton	Hugh John Flemming	Progressive Conservative	1960	4th term
Westmorland	Margaret Rideout	Liberal	1964	2nd term
York—Sunbury	John Chester MacRae	Progressive Conservative	1957	5th term

==== Newfoundland ====
Electoral district	Name	Party	First elected/previously elected	No. of terms
Bonavista—Twillingate	**Jack Pickersgill** (resigned 19 September 1967)	Liberal	1953	6th term
Bonavista—Twillingate	**Charles Granger** ‡ (by-election of 1967-11-06)	Liberal	1958, (Note: Grand Falls—White Bay—Labrador) 1967	5th term*
Burin—Burgeo	Chesley William Carter (until 8 July 1966 Senate appointment)	Liberal	1949	7th term
Burin—Burgeo	Don Jamieson (by-election of 1966-09-19)	Liberal	1966	1st term
Grand Falls—White Bay—Labrador	**Charles Granger** ‡ (resigned 1 August 1966)^{1}	Liberal	1958	4th term
Grand Falls—White Bay—Labrador	Andrew Chatwood (by-election of 1966-09-19)	Liberal	1966	1st term
Humber—St. George's	Herman Maxwell Batten	Liberal	1953	6th term
St. John's East	Joseph O'Keefe	Liberal	1963	2nd term
St. John's West	Richard Cashin ‡	Liberal	1962	3rd term
Trinity—Conception	James Roy Tucker	Liberal	1958	4th term

^{1}Granger resigned the seat of Grand Falls—White Bay—Labrador in August 1966 to contest a seat in the Newfoundland House of Assembly and was succeeded by Andrew Chatwood of the Liberals. Granger became Minister of Labrador Affairs in the provincial cabinet. He resigned his provincial office in September 1967 to contest the federal seat of Bonavista—Twillingate vacated by Jack Pickersgill. Granger was successful and became Minister without portfolio in Pearson's Cabinet.

==== Northwest Territories ====
Electoral district	Name	Party	First elected/previously elected	No. of terms
Northwest Territories	Robert Orange	Liberal	1965	1st term

==== Nova Scotia ====
Electoral district	Name	Party	First elected/previously elected	No. of terms
Antigonish—Guysborough	John Benjamin Stewart ‡	Liberal	1962	3rd term
Cape Breton North and Victoria	Robert Muir	Progressive Conservative	1957	5th term
Cape Breton South	Donald MacInnis	Progressive Conservative	1957, 1963	4th term*
Colchester—Hants	Cyril Kennedy (resigned 18 September 1967)	Progressive Conservative	1957	5th term
Colchester—Hants	Robert Stanfield (by-election of 1967-11-06)	Progressive Conservative	1967	1st term
Cumberland	Robert Coates	Progressive Conservative	1957	5th term
Digby—Annapolis—Kings	Pat Nowlan	Progressive Conservative	1965	1st term
Halifax*	Michael Forrestall	Progressive Conservative	1965	1st term
Halifax*	Robert McCleave	Progressive Conservative	1957, 1965	4th term*
Inverness—Richmond	**Allan MacEachen**	Liberal	1953, 1962	5th term*
Pictou	Russell MacEwan	Progressive Conservative	1957	5th term
Queens—Lunenburg	Lloyd Crouse	Progressive Conservative	1957	5th term
Shelburne—Yarmouth—Clare	John Oates Bower	Progressive Conservative	1965	1st term

==== Ontario ====
Electoral district	Name	Party	First elected/previously elected	No. of terms
Algoma East	**Lester B. Pearson**	Liberal	1948	8th term
Algoma West	George E. Nixon	Liberal	1940	9th term
Brantford	James Elisha Brown	Liberal	1953, 1962	4th term*
Brant—Haldimand	**Lawrence Pennell**	Liberal	1962	3rd term
Broadview	John Gilbert	New Democratic	1965	1st term
Bruce	John Loney	Progressive Conservative	1963	2nd term
Carleton	Dick Bell	Progressive Conservative	1957, 1965	4th term*
Cochrane	Joseph-Anaclet Habel	Liberal	1953	6th term
Danforth	Reid Scott	New Democratic	1962	3rd term
Davenport	**Walter L. Gordon**	Liberal	1962	3rd term
Dufferin—Simcoe	Ellwood Madill	Progressive Conservative	1963	2nd term
Durham	Russell Honey	Liberal	1962	3rd term
Eglinton	**Mitchell Sharp**	Liberal	1963	2nd term
Elgin	Harold Stafford	Liberal	1965	1st term
Essex East	**Paul Martin Sr.**	Liberal	1935	10th term
Essex South	Eugene Whelan	Liberal	1962	3rd term
Essex West	Herb Gray	Liberal	1962	3rd term
Fort William	Hubert Badanai	Liberal	1958	4th term
Glengarry—Prescott	Viateur Éthier	Liberal	1962	3rd term
Greenwood	Andrew Brewin	New Democratic	1962	3rd term
Grenville—Dundas	Jean Casselman Wadds	Progressive Conservative	1958	4th term
Grey—Bruce	Eric Winkler	Progressive Conservative	1957	5th term
Grey—Bruce	Eric Winkler resigned on September 30, 1967 to enter provincial politics	Vacant		
Grey North	Percy Verner Noble	Progressive Conservative	1957	5th term
Halton	Harry Harley	Liberal	1962	3rd term
Hamilton East	**John Munro** ‡	Liberal	1962	3rd term
Hamilton South	William Dean Howe	New Democratic	1963	2nd term
Hamilton West	Joseph Macaluso	Liberal	1963	2nd term
Hastings—Frontenac	Rod Webb	Progressive Conservative	1959	4th term
Hastings South	Lee Grills	Progressive Conservative	1957, 1965	4th term*
High Park	Pat Cameron	Liberal	1949, 1962	5th term*
Huron	Robert McKinley	Progressive Conservative	1965	1st term
Kenora—Rainy River	John Mercer Reid	Liberal	1965	1st term
Kent	Harold Danforth	Progressive Conservative	1958, 1963	3rd term*
Kingston	**Edgar Benson**	Liberal	1962	3rd term
Lambton—Kent	Mac McCutcheon	Progressive Conservative	1963	2nd term
Lambton West	Walter Frank Foy	Liberal	1962	3rd term
Lanark	Desmond Code	Progressive Conservative	1965	1st term
Leeds	John Matheson ‡	Liberal	1961	4th term
Lincoln	James McNulty	Liberal	1962	3rd term
London	Jack Irvine	Progressive Conservative	1963	2nd term
Middlesex East	Jim Lind	Liberal	1965	1st term
Middlesex West	William Howell Arthur Thomas	Progressive Conservative	1957	5th term
Niagara Falls	**Judy LaMarsh**	Liberal	1960	4th term
Nickel Belt	Norman Fawcett	New Democratic	1965	1st term
Nipissing	Carl Legault	Liberal	1964	2nd term
Norfolk	Jack Roxburgh	Liberal	1962	3rd term
Northumberland	George Hees	Progressive Conservative	1950, (Note: Broadview) 1965	6th term*
Ontario	Michael Starr	Progressive Conservative	1952	7th term
Ottawa East	Jean-Thomas Richard	Liberal	1945	8th term
Ottawa West	**George McIlraith**	Liberal	1940	9th term
Oxford	Wally Nesbitt	Progressive Conservative	1953	6th term
Parkdale	Stanley Haidasz ‡	Liberal	1957, (Note: Trinity) 1962	4th term*
Parry Sound-Muskoka	Gordon Aiken	Progressive Conservative	1957	5th term
Peel	Bruce Beer ‡	Liberal	1962	3rd term
Perth	J. Waldo Monteith	Progressive Conservative	1953	6th term
Peterborough	Hugh Faulkner	Liberal	1965	1st term
Port Arthur	Bob Andras	Liberal	1965	1st term
Prince Edward—Lennox	Douglas Alkenbrack	Progressive Conservative	1962	3rd term
Renfrew North	Len Hopkins	Liberal	1965	1st term
Renfrew South	**Joe Greene**	Liberal	1963	2nd term
Rosedale	**Donald Stovel Macdonald** ‡	Liberal	1962	3rd term
Russell	Paul Tardif	Liberal	1959	4th term
St. Paul's	Ian Wahn	Liberal	1962	3rd term
Simcoe East	Philip Bernard Rynard	Progressive Conservative	1957	5th term
Simcoe North	Heber Smith	Progressive Conservative	1957	5th term
Spadina	Sylvester Perry Ryan	Liberal	1962	3rd term
Stormont	Lucien Lamoureux (†)	Liberal	1962	3rd term
Sudbury	Rodger Mitchell (died 4 January 1967)	Liberal	1953	6th term
Sudbury	Bud Germa (by-election of 1967-05-29)	New Democratic	1967	1st term
Timiskaming	Arnold Peters	New Democratic	1957	5th term
Timmins	Murdo Martin	New Democratic	1957	5th term
Trinity	**Paul Hellyer**	Liberal	1949, (Note: Davenport) 1958	6th term*
Victoria	William C. Scott	Progressive Conservative	1965	1st term
Waterloo North	Kieth Hymmen	Liberal	1965	1st term
Waterloo South	Max Saltsman	New Democratic	1964	2nd term
Welland	Donald Tolmie	Liberal	1965	1st term
Wellington—Huron	Marvin Howe	Progressive Conservative	1953	6th term
Wellington South	Alfred Hales	Progressive Conservative	1957	5th term
Wentworth	John B. Morison	Liberal	1963	2nd term
York Centre	James Edgar Walker ‡	Liberal	1962	3rd term
York East	Steve Otto	Liberal	1962	3rd term
York—Humber	Ralph Cowan	Liberal	1962	3rd term
York—Humber	Ralph Cowan	Independent Liberal	1962	3rd term
York North	John Hollings Addison	Liberal	1962	3rd term
York—Scarborough	Robert Stanbury	Liberal	1965	1st term
York South	David Lewis	New Democratic	1962, 1965	2nd term*
York West	**Robert Winters**	Liberal	1945, (Note: Queens—Lunenburg/Lunenburg (Nova Scotia)) 1965	4th term*

==== Prince Edward Island ====
Electoral district	Name	Party	First elected/previously elected	No. of terms
King's	Melvin McQuaid	Progressive Conservative	1965	1st term
Prince	David MacDonald	Progressive Conservative	1965	1st term
Queen's*	Angus MacLean	Progressive Conservative	1951	7th term
Queen's*	Heath MacQuarrie	Progressive Conservative	1957	5th term

==== Quebec ====
Electoral district	Name	Party	First elected/previously elected	No. of terms
Argenteuil—Deux-Montagnes	Roger Régimbal	Progressive Conservative	1965	1st term
Beauce	Jean-Paul Racine	Liberal	1958, 1965	2nd term*
Beauharnois—Salaberry	Gérald Laniel	Liberal	1962	3rd term
Bellechasse	Herman Laverdière	Liberal	1963	3rd term
Berthier—Maskinongé—Delanaudière	Antonio Yanakis	Liberal	1965	1st term
Bonaventure	Albert Béchard ‡	Liberal	1962	3rd term
Brome—Missisquoi	Heward Grafftey	Progressive Conservative	1958	4th term
Cartier	Milton L. Klein	Liberal	1963	2nd term
Chambly—Rouville	Bernard Pilon	Liberal	1962	3rd term
Champlain	Jean-Paul Matte	Liberal	1962	3rd term
Chapleau	Gérard Laprise	Ralliement Créditiste	1962	3rd term
Charlevoix	Martial Asselin	Progressive Conservative	1958, 1965	2nd term*
Chicoutimi	Paul Langlois	Liberal	1965	1st term
Châteauguay—Huntingdon—Laprairie	Ian Watson	Liberal	1963	2nd term
Compton—Frontenac	Henry Latulippe	Ralliement Créditiste	1962	3rd term
Dollard	Jean-Pierre Goyer	Liberal	1965	1st term
Dorchester	Gustave Côté	Liberal	1965	1st term
Drummond—Arthabaska	**Jean-Luc Pépin**	Liberal	1963	2nd term
Gaspé	Russell Keays	Progressive Conservative	1958, (Note: Îles-de-la-Madeleine) 1965	2nd term*
Gatineau	Gaston Isabelle	Liberal	1965	1st term
Hochelaga	**Gérard Pelletier** ‡	Liberal	1965	1st term
Hull	Alexis Caron (died 31 August 1966)	Liberal	1953	6th term
Hull	Pierre Caron (by-election of 1967-05-29)	Liberal	1967	1st term
Îles-de-la-Madeleine	**Maurice Sauvé**	Liberal	1962	3rd term
Jacques-Cartier—Lasalle	Raymond Rock	Liberal	1962	3rd term
Joliette—l'Assomption—Montcalm	Joseph-Roland Comtois	Liberal	1965	1st term
Kamouraska	Charles-Eugène Dionne	Ralliement Créditiste	1962	3rd term
Labelle	Gaston Clermont	Liberal	1960, 1965	3rd term*
Lac-Saint-Jean	Alcide Simard	Ralliement Créditiste	1965	1st term
Lafontaine	Georges-C. Lachance	Liberal	1962	3rd term
Lapointe	Gilles Grégoire	Ralliement Créditiste	1962	3rd term
Lapointe	Gilles Grégoire	Independent	1962	3rd term
Laurier	Fernand Leblanc	Liberal	1964	2nd term
Laval	Jean-Léo Rochon	Liberal	1962	3rd term
Lévis	Raynald Guay	Liberal	1963	2nd term
Longueuil	**Jean-Pierre Côté**	Liberal	1963	2nd term
Lotbinière	Auguste Choquette	Liberal	1963	2nd term
Maisonneuve—Rosemont	J. Antonio Thomas	Liberal	1965	1st term
Matapédia—Matane	René Tremblay	Liberal	1963	2nd term
Matapédia—Matane	René Tremblay died on January 22, 1968	Vacant		
Mégantic	Raymond Langlois	Ralliement Créditiste	1962	3rd term
Mercier	Prosper Boulanger	Liberal	1962	3rd term
Montmagny—L'Islet	Jean-Charles Richard Berger	Liberal	1963	2nd term
Mount Royal	**Pierre Trudeau** ‡	Liberal	1965	1st term
Nicolet—Yamaska	Clément Vincent (resigned 4 May 1966)	Progressive Conservative	1962	3rd term
Nicolet—Yamaska	Florian Côté (by-election of 1966-09-19)	Liberal	1966	1st term
Notre-Dame-de-Grâce	Warren Allmand	Liberal	1965	1st term
Outremont—St-Jean	Maurice Lamontagne	Liberal	1963	2nd term
Outremont—St-Jean	Aurélien Noël (by-election of 1967-05-29)	Liberal	1967	1st term
Papineau	**Guy Favreau** (resigned 4 April 1967)	Liberal	1963	2nd term
Papineau	André Ouellet (by-election of 1967-05-29)	Liberal	1967	1st term
Pontiac—Témiscamingue	Thomas Lefebvre	Liberal	1965	1st term
Portneuf	Roland Godin	Ralliement Créditiste	1965	1st term
Québec—Montmorency	Ovide Laflamme ‡	Liberal	1955, (Note: Bellechasse) 1965	3rd term*
Quebec East	Gérard Duquet	Liberal	1965	1st term
Quebec South	Jean-Charles Cantin ‡	Liberal	1962	3rd term
Quebec West	**Jean Marchand**	Liberal	1965	1st term
Richelieu—Verchères	**Lucien Cardin** (resigned 4 April 1967)	Liberal	1952	7th term
Richelieu—Verchères	Jacques-Raymond Tremblay (by-election of 1967-05-29)	Liberal	1967	1st term
Richmond—Wolfe	Patrick Tobin Asselin	Liberal	1963	2nd term
Rimouski	Louis Guy LeBlanc	Liberal	1965	1st term
Rivière-du-Loup—Témiscouata	Rosaire Gendron	Liberal	1963	2nd term
Roberval	Charles-Arthur Gauthier	Ralliement Créditiste	1962	3rd term
Saguenay	Gustave Blouin	Liberal	1963	2nd term
St. Ann	Gérard Loiselle	Liberal	1957	5th term
Saint-Antoine—Westmount	**Charles (Bud) Drury**	Liberal	1962	3rd term
Saint-Denis	Marcel Prud'homme	Liberal	1964	2nd term
Saint-Henri	H.-Pit Lessard	Liberal	1958	4th term
Saint-Hyacinthe—Bagot	Théogène Ricard	Progressive Conservative	1957	5th term
Saint-Jacques	Maurice Rinfret	Liberal	1962	3rd term
Saint-Jacques	Maurice Rinfret died on December 26, 1967	Vacant		
Saint-Jean—Iberville—Napierville	Jean-Paul Beaulieu	Progressive Conservative	1965	1st term
St. Lawrence—St. George	**John Turner**	Liberal	1962	3rd term
Sainte-Marie	Georges Valade	Progressive Conservative	1958	4th term
Saint-Maurice—Laflèche	**Jean Chrétien** ‡	Liberal	1963	2nd term
Shefford	Louis-Paul Neveu	Liberal	1965	1st term
Sherbrooke	Maurice Allard	Independent Progressive Conservative	1958, (Note: First elected as a Progressive Conservative) 1965	2nd term*
Stanstead	Yves Forest	Liberal	1963	2nd term
Terrebonne	**Léo Cadieux**	Liberal	1962	3rd term
Trois-Rivières	Joseph-Alfred Mongrain	Independent	1965	1st term
Vaudreuil—Soulanges	René Émard	Liberal	1963	2nd term
Verdun	**Bryce Mackasey** ‡	Liberal	1962	3rd term
Villeneuve	Réal Caouette	Ralliement Créditiste	1946, (Note: Pontiac) 1962	4th term*

==== Saskatchewan ====
Electoral district	Name	Party	First elected/previously elected	No. of terms
Assiniboia	Lawrence Watson	Progressive Conservative	1963	2nd term
Humboldt—Melfort—Tisdale	Reynold Rapp	Progressive Conservative	1958	4th term
Kindersley	Reg Cantelon	Progressive Conservative	1963	2nd term
Mackenzie	Stanley Korchinski	Progressive Conservative	1958	4th term
Meadow Lake	Bert Cadieu	Progressive Conservative	1958	4th term
Melville	James Ormiston	Progressive Conservative	1958	4th term
Moose Jaw—Lake Centre	J. Ernest Pascoe	Progressive Conservative	1958	4th term
Moose Mountain	Richard Southam	Progressive Conservative	1958	4th term
Prince Albert	John Diefenbaker	Progressive Conservative	1940	9th term
Qu'Appelle	Alvin Hamilton	Progressive Conservative	1957	5th term
Regina City	Ken More	Progressive Conservative	1958	4th term
Rosetown—Biggar	Ronald McLelland	Progressive Conservative	1965	1st term
Rosthern	Edward Nasserden	Progressive Conservative	1958	4th term
Saskatoon	Lewis Brand	Progressive Conservative	1965	1st term
Swift Current—Maple Creek	Jack McIntosh	Progressive Conservative	1958	4th term
The Battlefords	Albert Horner	Progressive Conservative	1958	4th term
Yorkton	G. Drummond Clancy	Progressive Conservative	1958	4th term

==== Yukon ====
Electoral district	Name	Party	First elected/previously elected	No. of terms
Yukon	Erik Nielsen	Progressive Conservative	1957	5th term

== Committees ==
=== House ===
Standing

- Standing Committee on Agriculture, Forestry and Rural Development
- Standing Committee on Broadcasting, Films and Assistance to the Arts
- Standing Committee on External Affairs
- Standing Committee on Finance, Trade and Economic Affairs
- Standing Committee on Fisheries
- Standing Committee on Health and Welfare
- Standing Committee on Housing, Urban Development and Public Works
- Standing Committee on Indian Affairs, Human Rights and Citizenship and Immigration
- Standing Committee on Industry, Research and Energy Development
- Standing Committee on Justice and Legal Affairs
- Standing Committee on Labour and Employment
- Standing Committee on Miscellaneous Private Bills
- Standing Committee on National Defence
- Standing Committee on Northern Affairs and National Resources
- Standing Committee on Privileges and Elections
- Standing Committee on Public Accounts
- Standing Committee on Standing Orders
- Standing Committee on Transport and Communications
- Standing Committee on Veterans Affairs

Special

- Special Committee on Drug Costs and Prices
- Special Committee on Procedure of the House of Commons

=== Senate ===
Standing

- Standing Committee on Banking and Commerce
- Standing Committee on Civil Service Administration
- Standing Committee on External Relations
- Standing Committee on Finance
- Standing Committee on Immigration and Labour
- Standing Committee on Natural Resources
- Standing Committee on Transport and Communications

Special

- Special Committee on Aging
- Special Committee on the Criminal Code
- Special Committee on Science Policy

=== Joint ===
Standing

- None

Special

- Special Joint Committee on Consumer Credit
- Special Joint Committee on Divorce
- Special Joint Committee on Employer-Employee Relations in the Public Service of Canada
- Special Joint Committee on Immigration
- Special Joint Committee on Penitentiaries
- Special Joint Committee on the National and Royal Anthems
- Special Joint Committee Respecting Mr. Justice Landreville

== Legislation and motions ==
=== Act's which received royal assent under 27th Parliament ===
==== 1st Session ====
===== Public acts =====
Date of Assent	Index	Title	Bill Number
February 8, 1966	1	Appropriation Act No. 1, 1966	C-126
February 23, 1966	2	Electoral Boundaries Readjustment Act — An Act to extend time for consideration of objections	C-140
March 9, 1966	3	Appropriation Act No. 2, 1966 (Main Supply 1965–66)	C-161
March 31, 1966	4	Admiralty Act, An Act to amend the	C-157
March 31, 1966	5	Appropriation Act No. 3, 1966	C-159
March 31, 1966	6	Appropriation Act No. 4, 1966	C-3
March 31, 1966	7	Bank Act and the Quebec Savings Banks Act, An Act to amend the	C-160
March 31, 1966	8	Judges Act, An Act to amend the	S-15
March 31, 1966	9	Milltown Bridge Act	C-153
May 12, 1966	10	Aeronautics Act, An Act to amend the	C-152
May 12, 1966	11	Agricultural Rehabilitation and Development Act, An Act to amend the	S-14
May 12, 1966	12	Bills of Exchange Act, An Act to amend the	C-144
May 12, 1966	13	Bretton Woods Agreements Act, An Act to amend the	C-154
May 12, 1966	14	Canada–United Kingdom, Canada–Sweden Income Tax Agreement Act, 1966	C-165
May 12, 1966	15	Canadian National Railway Branch Line—Amesdale	S-23
May 12, 1966	16	Export and Import Permits Act, An Act to amend the	C-171
May 12, 1966	17	Farm Credit Act, An Act to amend the	C-145
May 12, 1966	18	Fisheries Development Act	C-149
May 12, 1966	19	Science Council of Canada Act	C-189
June 2, 1966	20	Appropriation Act No. 5, 1966	C-185
June 2, 1966	21	Newfoundland Additional Financial Assistance Act, 1966	C-146
June 2, 1966	22	Northwest Territories Act, An Act to amend the	C-169
June 16, 1966	23	Combines Investigation Act and the Criminal Code, An Act to amend the	C-2
June 16, 1966	24	Fair Wages and Hours of Labour Act, An Act to amend the	C-178
June 16, 1966	25	Government Organization Act, 1966	C-150
June 16, 1966	26	Research Council Act, An Act to amend the	C-186
June 16, 1966	27	Training Allowance Act, 1966	C-147
June 16, 1966	28	Yukon Act, An Act to amend the	C-224
July 11, 1966	29	Appropriation Act No. 6, 1966	C-226
July 11, 1966	30	Appropriation Act No. 7, 1966	C-213
July 11, 1966	31	Atlantic Development Board Act, An Act to amend the	S-17
July 11, 1966	32	Bankruptcy Act, An Act to amend the	C-197
July 11, 1966	33	Canada Student Loans Act, An Act to amend the	C-205
July 11, 1966	34	Canadian Dairy Commission Act	C-210
July 11, 1966	35	Canadian National Railway Branch Lines (Osborne Lake, Manitoba, and Guernsey, Saskatchewan)	C-174
July 11, 1966	36	Company of Young Canadians Act	C-208
July 11, 1966	37	Crop Insurance Act, An Act to amend the	C-200
July 11, 1966	38	Customs Tariff Act, An Act to amend the	C-201
July 11, 1966	39	Exchequer Court Act, An Act to amend the	C-198
July 11, 1966	40	Excise Tax Act, An Act to amend the	C-151
July 11, 1966	41	Fund for Rural Economic Development Act	C-199
July 11, 1966	42	Health Resources Fund Act	C-211
July 11, 1966	43	Public Utilities Income Tax Transfer Act	C-193
July 11, 1966	44	Statute Law (Superannuation) Amendment Act, 1966	C-207
July 15, 1966	45	Canada Assistance Plan	S-42
July 15, 1966	46	Canadian Corporation for the 1967 World Exhibition Act, An Act to amend the	C-216
July 15, 1966	47	Income Tax Act, An Act to amend the	C-194
July 15, 1966	48	National Arts Centre Act	C-215
July 15, 1966	49	St. Lawrence Ports Working Conditions Act	C-230
September 1, 1966	50	Maintenance of Railway Operation Act, 1966	C-245
November 17, 1966	51	Appropriation Act No. 8, 1966	C-218
November 17, 1966	52	Livestock Feed Assistance Act	C-241
November 22, 1966	53	National Housing Act, 1954, An Act to amend the	S-53
November 28, 1966	54	Bank Act and the Quebec Savings Banks Act, An Act to amend the	C-248
November 30, 1966	55	Appropriation Act No. 9, 1966 (Main Supply)	C-254
December 14, 1966	56	Appropriation Act No. 10, 1966	S-45
December 14, 1966	57	Boundary between the Provinces of Manitoba and Saskatchewan, An Act respecting the	S-46
December 14, 1966	58	Boundary between the Province of Saskatchewan and the Northwest Territories, An Act respecting the	S-54
December 14, 1966	59	Canada Labour (Standards) Code, An Act to amend the	S-48
December 14, 1966	60	Canada Lands Surveys Act, An Act to amend the	S-47
December 21, 1966	61	Boundary between the Province of Manitoba and the Northwest Territories, An Act respecting the	S-35
December 21, 1966	62	Canada Labour (Safety) Code	C-253
December 21, 1966	63	Export Credits Insurance Act, An Act to amend the	C-227
December 21, 1966	64	Medical Care Act	C-251
December 21, 1966	65	Old Age Security Act, An Act to amend the	S-51
February 9, 1967	66	Canada Corporations Act, An Act to amend the	C-229
February 9, 1967	67	Canadian National Railways Financing and Guarantee Act, 1965–66	C-262
February 9, 1967	68	Judges Act, An Act to amend the	C-231
February 9, 1967	69	National Transportation Act	C-261
February 17, 1967	70	Canada Deposit Insurance Corporation Act	C-181
February 23, 1967	71	Public Service Employment Act	S-170
February 23, 1967	72	Public Service Staff Relations Act	C-271
March 1, 1967	73	Appropriation Act No. 1, 1967	C-182
March 1, 1967	74	Financial Administration Act, An Act to amend the	S-56
March 1, 1967	75	Income Tax Convention Act	C-267
March 1, 1967	76	Judges Act, An Act to amend the	S-55
March 1, 1967	77	Postal Services Interruption Relief Act	C-204
March 1, 1967	78	Canadian Film Development Corporation Act	C-268
March 10, 1967	79	Excise Tax Act and the Old Age Security Act, An Act to amend the	C-274
March 10, 1967	80	Fund for Rural Economic Development Act, An Act to amend the	C-265
March 10, 1967	81	Governor General’s Retiring Annuity Act	C-252
March 10, 1967	82	Industrial Research and Development Incentives Act	S-270
March 10, 1967	83	Small Businesses Loans Act, An Act to amend the	C-266
March 10, 1967	84	Statutory Salaries Revision Act, 1967	S-282
March 23, 1967	85	Appropriation Act No. 2, 1967	S-283
March 23, 1967	86	Appropriation Act No. 3, 1967	C-222
March 23, 1967	87	Bank Act	S-190
March 23, 1967	88	Bank of Canada Act, An Act to amend the	S-277
March 23, 1967	89	Federal–Provincial Fiscal Arrangements Act, 1967	C-220
March 23, 1967	90	Immigration Appeal Board Act	C-259
March 23, 1967	91	Income Tax Act, An Act to amend the, and to repeal the Canadian Vessel Construction Assistance Act	S-221
March 23, 1967	92	Pension Benefits Standards Act	C-223
March 23, 1967	93	Quebec Savings Banks Act	C-278
May 8, 1967	94	Adult Occupational Training Act	S-293
May 8, 1967	95	Appropriation Act No. 4, 1967	S-243
May 8, 1967	96	Canadian Forces Reorganization Act	S-280
May 8, 1967	97	Income Tax Act, An Act to amend the	S-16

===== Local and private acts =====
Date of Assent	Index	Title	Bill Number
Various March 31, 1966 - May 8, 1967	98	Bank of British Columbia, An Act to incorporate	S-16
Various March 31, 1966 - May 8, 1967	99	Bank of Western Canada, An Act to incorporate	S-111
Various March 31, 1966 - May 8, 1967	100	Anniversary Life Insurance Company, An Act to incorporate	S-28
Various March 31, 1966 - May 8, 1967	101	Canada Health and Accident Assurance Corporation, An Act respecting	S-13
Various March 31, 1966 - May 8, 1967	102	Income Disability and Reinsurance Company of Canada, An Act to incorporate	S-12
Various March 31, 1966 - May 8, 1967	103	Income Life Insurance Company of Canada, An Act to incorporate	S-11
Various March 31, 1966 - May 8, 1967	104	Laurier Life Insurance Company, An Act to incorporate	S-27
Various March 31, 1966 - May 8, 1967	105	North West Life Assurance Company of Canada, An Act to incorporate The	S-25
Various March 31, 1966 - May 8, 1967	106	Pacific Coast Fire Insurance Company, An Act respecting The	S-6
Various March 31, 1966 - May 8, 1967	107	Société des Artisans, An Act respecting La	S-41
Various March 31, 1966 - May 8, 1967	108	Interprovincial Pipe Line Company, An Act respecting	S-10
Various March 31, 1966 - May 8, 1967	109	Canadian Pacific Railway Company, An Act respecting	S-32
Various March 31, 1966 - May 8, 1967	110	Canadian Pacific Railway Company, An Act respecting	S-34
Various March 31, 1966 - May 8, 1967	111	Canadian Board of Missions of the Church of God, An Act to incorporate	S-18
Various March 31, 1966 - May 8, 1967	112	Evangelical Covenant Church of Canada, An Act to incorporate The	S-38
Various March 31, 1966 - May 8, 1967	113	Evangelistic Tabernacle Incorporated, An Act to incorporate	S-7
Various March 31, 1966 - May 8, 1967	114	Lutheran Church in America—Canada Section, An Act to incorporate	S-39
Various March 31, 1966 - May 8, 1967	115	Mennonite Central Committee (Canada), An Act to incorporate	S-37
Various March 31, 1966 - May 8, 1967	116	Presbyterian Church in Canada, An Act respecting the Trustee Board of The	S-20
Various March 31, 1966 - May 8, 1967	117	United Baptist Woman’s Missionary Union of the Maritime Provinces, An Act respecting	S-33
Various March 31, 1966 - May 8, 1967	118	General Mortgage Service Corporation of Canada, An Act respecting	S-8
Various March 31, 1966 - May 8, 1967	119	League Savings and Mortgage Company, An Act to incorporate	S-30
Various March 31, 1966 - May 8, 1967	120	International Society of Endocrinology, An Act to incorporate The	S-29
Various March 31, 1966 - May 8, 1967	121	United Grain Growers Limited, An Act respecting	S-5

==== 2nd Session ====
===== Public acts =====
Date of Assent	Index	Title	Bill Number
June 8, 1967	1	Immigration Act, An Act to amend the	C-118
July 7, 1967	2	Appropriation Act No. 5, 1967 (Main Supply)	C-146
July 7, 1967	3	Appropriation Act No. 6, 1967 (Interim)	C-147
July 7, 1967	4	Canadian Citizenship Act, An Act to amend the	S-4
July 7, 1967	5	Canadian Wheat Board Act, An Act to amend the	C-106
July 7, 1967	6	Cape Breton Development Corporation Act	C-135
July 7, 1967	7	Interpretation Act	S-6
November 6, 1967	8	Appropriation Act No. 7, 1967	C-180
November 6, 1967	9	Canada Corporation Act, An Act to amend the	S-10
November 6, 1967	10	Electoral Boundaries Readjustment Act, An Act respecting the	C-159
November 6, 1967	11	Electoral Boundaries Readjustment Act, An Act respecting the	C-165
December 21, 1967	12	British Columbia and the Yukon and Northwest Territories, An Act respecting the boundary between the Province of	S-19
December 21, 1967	13	Canada Manpower and Immigration Council Act	C-150
February 1, 1968	24	Divorce Act	C-187
March 7, 1968	25	Broadcasting Act	C-163
March 7, 1968	26	Currency, Mint and Exchange Fund Act and the Criminal Code, An Act to amend the	S-23
March 7, 1968	27	Defence Production Act, An Act to amend the	S-28
March 7, 1968	28	Excise Act, An Act to amend the	C-192
March 7, 1968	29	Excise Tax Act, An Act to amend the	C-191
March 7, 1968	30	Fish Inspection Act, An Act to amend the	S-27
March 7, 1968	31	Northern Ontario Pipe Line Crown Corporation Dissolution Act	S-29
March 7, 1968	32	Territorial Lands Act, the Land Titles Act and the Public Lands Grants Act, An Act to amend the	S-32
March 7, 1968	33	Unemployment Insurance Act, An Act to amend the	C-197
March 27, 1968	34	Appropriation Act No. 1, 1968	C-211
March 27, 1968	35	Appropriation Act No. 2, 1968	C-212
March 27, 1968	36	Canada Deposit Insurance Corporation Act, An Act to amend the	S-24
March 27, 1968	37	Immigration Act, An Act to amend the	C-30
March 27, 1968	38	Income Tax Act, An Act to amend the	C-208
March 27, 1968	39	National Housing Act, 1954, An Act to amend the	C-202

==== Local and private acts ====
Date of Assent	Index	Title	Bill Number
Various July 7, 1967 - March 7, 1968	40	Farmers Central Mutual Insurance Company, An Act to incorporate	S-13
Various July 7, 1967 - March 7, 1968	41	Principal Life Insurance Company of Canada, An Act respecting	S-1
Various July 7, 1967 - March 7, 1968	42	United Investment Life Assurance Company, An Act to incorporate	C-114
Various July 7, 1967 - March 7, 1968	43	Western Farmers Mutual Insurance Company, An Act to incorporate	S-12
Various July 7, 1967 - March 7, 1968	44	Cabri Pipe Lines Ltd., An Act to incorporate	S-16
Various July 7, 1967 - March 7, 1968	45	Commercial Solids Pipe Line Company, An Act to incorporate	C-113
Various July 7, 1967 - March 7, 1968	46	Trans-Canada Pipe Lines Limited, An Act respecting	S-26
Various July 7, 1967 - March 7, 1968	47	Vawn Pipe Lines Ltd., An Act to incorporate	S-17
Various July 7, 1967 - March 7, 1968	48	Bell Telephone Company of Canada, An Act respecting The	C-104
Various July 7, 1967 - March 7, 1968	49	Co-operative Trust Company Limited, An Act respecting	S-20

== See also ==
- List of Canadian electoral districts 1952-1966 for a list of the ridings in this parliament.
