= Cyril Kennedy =

Cyril Kennedy may refer to:

- Cyril Kennedy (Canadian politician)
- Cyril Kennedy (Australian politician)
