= Roy Fournier =

Canadian lawyer and politician

Roy Fournier, QC (August 22, 1921 – June 20, 1991) was a lawyer and political figure in Quebec. He represented Gatineau in the Legislative Assembly of Quebec and then National Assembly of Quebec from 1962 to 1972 as a Liberal member.

== Biography ==
He was born in Maniwaki, Quebec, and is the son of Alphonse Fournier, who served in the Canadian House of Commons, and Lorette Roy. Fournier studied at the Normal School in Hull, at the Collège Brébeuf in Montreal, at the University of Ottawa and at the Université de Montréal. He was admitted to the Quebec bar in 1948. Fournier was legal counsel for the city of Hull and the municipalities of Pointe-Gatineau, Denholm and Low. He was named Queen's Counsel in 1963 and was bâtonnier for the Hull bar in 1964 and 1965.

Fournier served as a lieutenant in the Royal Canadian Navy during World War II and received the Atlantic Star in 1945. In 1945, he married Pauline Audet. He was president of the Hull branch of the Royal Canadian Legion from 1952 to 1955.

Fournier served in the Quebec cabinet as Minister of State in 1971 and Solicitor General of Quebec from 1971 to 1972. He resigned his seat in August 1972, when he was named a judge in the provincial court, assigned to the Transport Tribunal.

He died in Montreal at the age of 69.
