= Alexandre Taché (politician) =

Canadian politician (1899–1961)

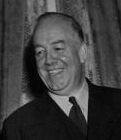

Member of the Legislative Assembly of Quebec for Hull
- In office 1936–1939
- Preceded by: Alexis Caron
- Succeeded by: Alexis Caron
- In office 1944–1956
- Preceded by: Alexis Caron
- Succeeded by: Oswald Parent

President of the Legislative Assembly of Quebec
- In office February 7, 1945 – December 15, 1955
- Preceded by: Cyrille Dumaine
- Succeeded by: Maurice Tellier

Personal details
- Born: August 17, 1899 Saint-Hyacinthe, Quebec, Canada
- Died: March 9, 1961 (aged 61) Hull, Quebec, Canada
- Party: Union Nationale

Alexandre Taché (French pronunciation: [alɛksɑ̃dʁ taʃe]; August 17, 1899 – March 9, 1961) was a lawyer and political figure in Quebec. He represented Hull in the Legislative Assembly of Quebec from 1936 to 1939 and from 1944 to 1956 as a Union Nationale member. Taché was Speaker of the Legislative Assembly from 1945 to 1955.

He was born in Saint-Hyacinthe, Quebec, the son of Joseph de La Broquerie Taché and Marie-Louise Langevin. Taché was educated at the Séminaire de Saint-Hyacinthe, the University of Ottawa and the Université de Montréal. He was called to the Quebec bar in 1924 and set up practice in Hull. In 1925, he married Berthe Laflamme. He was named King's Counsel in 1938. He was bâtonnier for the Hull bar in 1939 and 1944. Taché was defeated when he ran for reelection to the Quebec assembly in 1939. He resigned his seat in the Quebec assembly in 1956 when he was named judge in the magistrate's court for Hull, Terrebonne and Pontiac districts. In 1958, he was named to the Quebec Superior Court.

Taché died in Hull at the age of 61 and was buried in the Notre-Dame de Hull Cemetery.
