= Frank Thomas Stanfield =

Canadian businessman, politician and MP (1903–67)

Member of Parliament for Colchester—Hants
- In office 11 June 1945 – 9 August 1953
- Preceded by: Gordon Purdy
- Succeeded by: Gordon Purdy

Personal details
- Born: 25 February 1903; Truro, Nova Scotia, Canada
- Died: 2 July 1967 (aged 64)
- Political party: Progressive Conservative Party
- Spouse: Elizabeth Matheson (m. 1932)
- Relatives: Frank Stanfield (father); John Stanfield (uncle); Robert Lorne Stanfield (brother)
- Education: McGill University
- Occupation: Businessman; Politician

Frank Thomas Stanfield (25 February 1903 – 2 July 1967) was a Canadian businessman and Progressive Conservative Party politician who was twice elected Member of the Canadian Parliament for the Colchester—Hants riding in Nova Scotia (1945–53). He was the son of the Canadian politician Frank Stanfield and brother of Robert Lorne Stanfield.

== Early life ==
Stanfield was born in Truro, Nova Scotia, the son of the politician Frank Stanfield and Sarah Emma Thomas. His brother was Robert Lorne Stanfield. He was educated in Truro and at McGill University. In 1932, he married Elizabeth Matheson. Stanfield served as president of Stanfield's Limited. He was also a director for Sobeys.

== Career ==
Stanfield served two terms for the Progressive Conservative Party in the 20th and 21st Canadian Parliaments. His career background was in industry. He died in Truro, Nova Scotia, in 1967 at the age of 64, just over two months before his brother, Nova Scotia Premier Robert Stanfield, became leader of the Progressive Conservatives.

== Electoral record ==
1945 Canadian federal election: Colchester—Hants
Party	Candidate	Votes
Progressive Conservative	Frank Thomas Stanfield	11,141
Liberal	Gordon Purdy	11,133
Co-operative Commonwealth	Clifford Parker Wyman	2,165

1949 Canadian federal election: Colchester—Hants
Party	Candidate	Votes
Progressive Conservative	Frank Thomas Stanfield	13,550
Liberal	Gordon Purdy	13,149
Co-operative Commonwealth	Frederick C.G. Scott	814
