= Gaston Isabelle =

Canadian politician

Official 1984 portrait

Joseph Gaston Isabelle (14 November 1920, in Hull, Quebec (now Gatineau, Quebec) – 4 June 2013) was a Liberal party member of the House of Commons of Canada. He was a physician by career.

== Biography ==
Isabelle was educated at the University of Ottawa and the Université de Montréal and went on to practice in Hull and Lucerne. He was mayor of Lucerne from 1961 to 1965. He was first elected in the 1965 federal election at the Gatineau electoral district. In the 1968 federal election, Isabelle campaigned in the Hull electoral district where he was re-elected in successive elections until the 1984 general election, at which point his riding was known as Hull—Aylmer.

Isabelle left federal politics in 1988 after successful re-elections in all successive campaigns. He served seven consecutive terms of office from the 27th through 33rd Canadian Parliaments.

He married Madeleine Sara-Bournet in 1946.

== Electoral record ==
1980 Canadian federal election: Hull
Party	Candidate	Votes	%
Liberal	Gaston Isabelle	27,938	68.13
New Democratic	Michel Légère	10,059	24.53
Progressive Conservative	Roland Lefebvre	2,167	5.28
Rhinoceros	Sylvain Dompierre	598	1.46
Non-Affiliated	Marc Bonhomme	174	0.42
Marxist–Leninist	Pierre Soublière	70	0.17
Total valid votes		41,006	100.00
Total rejected ballots		200	
Turnout		41,206	69.66
Electors on the lists		59,150	
lop.parl.ca

1979 Canadian federal election: Hull
Party	Candidate	Votes	%	±%
Liberal	Gaston Isabelle	30,413	70.18	
New Democratic	Michel Légère	7,175	16.56	
Social Credit	Jean Tessier	2,357	5.44	
Progressive Conservative	Jean-Paul St-Amand	2,320	5.35	
Rhinoceros	Pierre Cantin	835	1.93	
Union populaire	René Coté	132	0.30	
Marxist–Leninist	Pierre Soublière	106	0.24	
Total valid votes		43,338	100.00	
Total rejected ballots		311		
Turnout		43,649	76.88	
Electors on the lists		56,777		
