= Michel Légère =

Quebec lawyer, former civil servant and politician (born 1943)

Michel Légère (born August 10, 1943) is a Quebec lawyer, former civil servant and politician. He served as mayor of Hull from 1981 to 1991.

Born in Pictou, Nova Scotia, Légère studied at the University of Ottawa and was called to the Bar of Quebec in 1970. He married Monique Lacerte. He served in several federal government departments, including Environment Canada, the Privy Council Office and Transport Canada. From 1978 to 1981, he practised law. In 1979 and again in 1980, he was an unsuccessful New Democratic Party candidate in the Hull federal riding, losing each time to Liberal Gaston Isabelle. He was a professor at the University of Ottawa from 1992 to 1993. He ran unsuccessfully for the Parti Québécois in the Hull provincial riding in 1994, losing to Liberal Robert LeSage. Légère is credited with inspiring the development of the Quebec Route Verte bicycle network and later served as president of Vélo Québec. He was president of Gatineau's ombudsman office for five years. Légère was named to the Order of Gatineau in 2012.
