= Gordon Purdy =

Canadian politician (1888–1974)

Member of Parliament for Colchester—Hants
- In office 10 August 1953 – 9 June 1957
- Preceded by: Frank Thomas Stanfield
- Succeeded by: Cyril Kennedy
- In office 14 October 1935 – 10 June 1945
- Preceded by: District created
- Succeeded by: Frank Thomas Stanfield

Personal details
- Born: Gordon Timlin Purdy; 1 July 1888 East Amherst, Nova Scotia, Canada
- Died: 22 December 1974 (aged 86) Moncton, New Brunswick, Canada
- Party: Liberal
- Profession: Lumber Merchant

Gordon Timlin Purdy (1 July 1888 – 22 December 1974) was a Liberal party member of the House of Commons of Canada, 1935-1945 and 1953–1957. He was born in East Amherst, Nova Scotia and became a lumber merchant by career.

He was first elected to Parliament at the Colchester—Hants riding in the 1935 general election then re-elected there in 1940. Purdy was defeated in the 1945 election by Frank Thomas Stanfield. When Stanfield left federal politics, Purdy won Colchester—Hants in the 1953 election. After serving his final House of Commons term, the 22nd Canadian Parliament, Purdy was defeated by Cyril Kennedy of the Progressive Conservative party in the 1957 election.

Purdy was married to Alma Louise Kaiser in 1913. They had three daughters and a son, Eleanor, Joan, Marion and James.

== Electoral record ==
1935 Canadian federal election: Colchester—Hants
Party	Candidate	Votes
Liberal	Gordon Purdy	9,608
Conservative	William Boardman Armstrong	9,402
Reconstruction	Wentworth Chauncy Miller	1,923

1940 Canadian federal election: Colchester—Hants
Party	Candidate	Votes
Liberal	Gordon Purdy	12,328
National Government	Hadley B. Tremain	10,044

1945 Canadian federal election: Colchester—Hants
Party	Candidate	Votes
Progressive Conservative	Frank Thomas Stanfield	11,141
Liberal	Gordon Purdy	11,133
Co-operative Commonwealth	Clifford Parker Wyman	2,165

1949 Canadian federal election: Colchester—Hants
Party	Candidate	Votes
Progressive Conservative	Frank Thomas Stanfield	13,550
Liberal	Gordon Purdy	13,149
Co-operative Commonwealth	Frederick C.G. Scott	814

1953 Canadian federal election: Colchester—Hants
Party	Candidate	Votes
Liberal	Gordon Purdy	12,660
Progressive Conservative	Fred M. Blois	12,271
Co-operative Commonwealth	Ralph Loomer	936

1957 Canadian federal election: Colchester—Hants
Party	Candidate	Votes
Progressive Conservative	Cyril Kennedy	15,231
Liberal	Gordon T. Purdy	12,151
Co-operative Commonwealth	Ralph Loomer	912
