= Joseph-Éloi Fontaine =

Canadian politician

Member of the Canadian Parliament for Hull
- In office 1917–1930
- Preceded by: District was created in 1914
- Succeeded by: Alphonse Fournier

Personal details
- Born: September 14, 1865 Beloeil, Canada East
- Died: June 11, 1930 (aged 64)
- Party: Liberal

Joseph-Éloi Fontaine (September 14, 1865 – June 11, 1930) was a physician and political figure in Quebec. He represented Hull in the House of Commons of Canada from 1917 to 1930 as a Liberal.

He was born in Beloeil, Canada East, the son of Charles Fontaine, and was educated in Marieville. He served on the town council for Hull from 1904 to 1908 and was mayor in 1909 and 1910. He also served as chairman of the Hull Board of Trade and chairman of the Medical Board of the Hull Hospital. Fontaine was elected as a Laurier Liberal in 1917.
