= Alphonse Fournier =

Canadian politician

The Honourable Alphonse Fournier PC QC
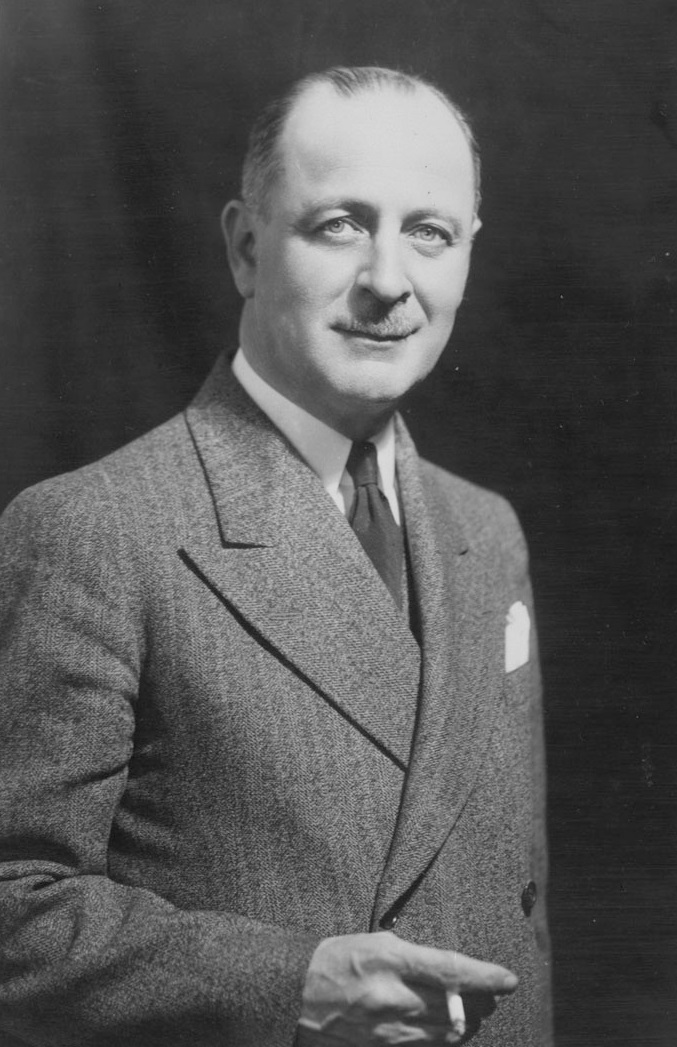

Leader of the Government in the House of Commons
- In office May 1, 1948 – May 8, 1953
- Prime Minister: Louis St. Laurent
- Preceded by: Ian Alistair Mackenzie
- Succeeded by: Walter Harris

Minister of Public Works
- In office October 7, 1942 – June 11, 1953
- Prime Minister: Louis St. Laurent; W. L. Mackenzie King
- Preceded by: Joseph-Enoil Michaud (acting)
- Succeeded by: Walter Harris (acting)

Member of Parliament for Hull
- In office July 28, 1930 – August 9, 1953
- Preceded by: Joseph-Éloi Fontaine
- Succeeded by: Alexis Caron

Personal details
- Born: March 24, 1893 Methuen, Massachusetts, U.S.
- Died: October 8, 1961 (aged 68) Hull, Quebec, Canada
- Party: Liberal
- Spouse: Lorette Roy (m. 1917)
- Relations: Joseph-Célestin Nadon (cousin)
- Children: 4, including Roy
- Education: University of Montreal; Laval University
- Profession: Lawyer; teacher

Alphonse Fournier PC QC (March 24, 1893 – October 8, 1961) was a Canadian politician.

== Biography ==
Born in Methuen, Massachusetts, he was first elected to the House of Commons of Canada representing the Quebec riding of Hull in the 1930 federal election. A Liberal, he was re-elected in 1935, 1940, 1945, and 1949.

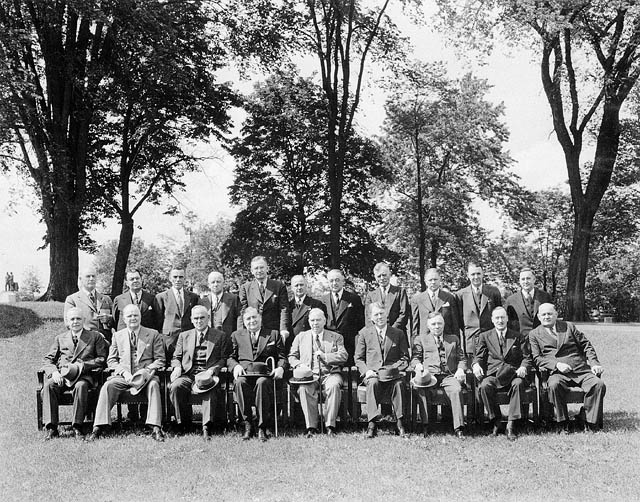
Hon. Alphone Fournier and colleagues in the 16th Canadian Ministry (Rear, L-R): Hons. J. J. McCann, Paul Martin, Joseph Jean, J. A. Glen, Brooke Claxton, Alphonse Fournier, Ernest Bertrand, A. G. L. McNaughton, Lionel Chevrier, D. C. Abbott, D. L. MacLaren

From 1942 to 1953, he was the Minister of Public Works. From 1948 to 1953, he was the Leader of the Government in the House of Commons and Liberal Party House Leader.

His son, Roy Fournier, was also a member of the Quebec parliament and solicitor general for the province of Quebec.

There is a Alphonse Fournier fonds at Library and Archives Canada.
