= Cyril Kennedy (Canadian politician) =

Canadian politician

Cyril Frost Kennedy ED
- Official 1966 portrait

Member of Parliament for Colchester—Hants
- In office 10 June 1957 – 17 September 1967
- Preceded by: Gordon Purdy
- Succeeded by: Robert Stanfield

Personal details
- Born: Cyril Frost Kennedy; 20 April 1915 Hilden, Nova Scotia, Canada
- Died: 12 January 1974 (aged 58) Truro, Nova Scotia, Canada
- Party: Progressive Conservative
- Profession: Building Contractor; Businessman; Lumberman

Military service
- Allegiance: Canada
- Branch/service: Canadian Army
- Years of service: 1934–1945
- Rank: Major
- Unit: North Nova Scotia Highlanders
- Battles/wars: Second World War: Normandy Landings; Operation Charnwood (WIA)

Cyril Frost Kennedy ED (20 April 1915 – 12 January 1974) was a Canadian soldier and Progressive Conservative party member of the House of Commons of Canada.

== Early life ==
Kennedy was born in Hilden, Nova Scotia to Liberal-Conservative Nova Scotia MLA Robert H. Kennedy along with nine other siblings.

He took up lumber work and carpentry working with the family sawmill until joining the Canadian Army.

== Military career ==
Kennedy was commissioned as an officer in 1934 as part of The North Nova Scotia Highlanders. He participated in the 1937, 1938 and 1939 Army Operational Shooting Competition in Bisley, England as part of the Canadian team. He had qualified for the 1940 match, but this was cancelled due to the outbreak of World War II.

In 1940, he volunteered for overseas service and was commanding officer of the North Nova Scotia Highlanders' D Company at Juno Beach. On 7 June he was engaged in fighting in Buron where elements of the 12th SS Panzer Division had attacked. Two other North Nova Scotia Highlanders companies were encircled and surrendered with D Company digging in to the North of Buron. After four hours fighting, they were able to repulse the German advance with limited outside support. During the engagement Kennedy personally captured an SS machine gunner. Some of the Canadian soldiers captured that day were later executed during the Ardenne Abbey Massacre.

On July 8, during Operation Charnwood Kennedy was seriously wounded by shrapnel causing the dismemberment of his right arm. After the injury Kennedy continued commanding his company for an additional two hours before retiring to an aid post.

After the war, Kennedy continued to teach marksmanship to cadets and participate in military shooting competitions despite his one arm. The Nova Scotia Rifle Association's Kennedy Medal and Kennedy Match are named for him.

== Politics ==
In the lead up to the 1949 Nova Scotia general election, Kennedy contested the Progressive Conservative nomination for Colchester but was narrowly beaten by George Isaac Smith.

Kennedy was first elected for the riding of Colchester—Hants in the 1957 general election, then re-elected there in 1958, 1962, 1963 and 1965.

Kennedy debated in the House of Commons against the unification of the Canadian Armed Forces and in favour of the retention of the Canadian Red Ensign as part of the Great Canadian flag debate. In 1966 he voted against the abolition of the death penalty.

On 17 September 1967, Kennedy left the House of Commons before the end of his term in the 27th Canadian Parliament to allow the new Progressive Conservative leader Robert Stanfield to run in his seat. He did not campaign for any further re-election.

Following Kennedy's resignation, Lester B. Pearson described him in the House of Commons as "a member of quiet sincerity and friendly disposition who had won the affection of all members of this house who knew him". Robert Stanfield said Kennedy was "a very gallant Canadian who has done much to serve his country", then joked it was yet to be seen what service he had rendered by giving up his seat for Stanfield to run.

== Later life ==
In 1969 Kennedy served on a royal commission investigating the costs of provincial elections in Nova Scotia.

Kennedy died on January 12, 1974 in Truro, Nova Scotia at the age of 58.

=== Electoral record ===
1957 Canadian federal election: Colchester—Hants
Party	Candidate	Votes
Progressive Conservative	Cyril Kennedy	15,231
Liberal	Gordon T. Purdy	12,151
Co-operative Commonwealth	Ralph Loomer	912

1958 Canadian federal election: Colchester—Hants
Party	Candidate	Votes
Progressive Conservative	Cyril Kennedy	15,653
Liberal	Robert Faulkner McLellan	11,779
Co-operative Commonwealth	Ralph Loomer	1,267

1962 Canadian federal election: Colchester—Hants
Party	Candidate	Votes
Progressive Conservative	Cyril Kennedy	14,128
Liberal	Hector Hill	13,836
New Democratic	Lawrence C. Cameron	1,207
Unknown	K.Y. Parker	411

1963 Canadian federal election: Colchester—Hants
Party	Candidate	Votes
Progressive Conservative	Cyril Kennedy	14,387
Liberal	Hector Hill	14,185
New Democratic	Laurence C. Cameron	822

1965 Canadian federal election: Colchester—Hants
Party	Candidate	Votes
Progressive Conservative	Cyril Kennedy	15,250
Liberal	Hector Hill	12,962
New Democratic	Gordon S. Schurman	1,078
Independent	Robert Kirk	299
