= Colchester—Hants =

Former federal electoral district in Nova Scotia, Canada

Nova Scotia electoral district

Defunct federal electoral district
- Legislature: House of Commons
- District created: 1933
- District abolished: 1966
- First contested: 1935
- Last contested: 1967 by-election

Colchester—Hants was a federal electoral district in Nova Scotia, Canada, that was represented in the House of Commons of Canada from 1935 to 1968.

This riding was created in 1933 from Colchester and Hants—Kings. It consisted of the counties of Colchester and Hants. It was abolished in 1966 when it was redistributed into Annapolis Valley, Halifax—East Hants, and Cumberland—Colchester North ridings.

== Members of Parliament ==
This riding elected the following members of Parliament:

Parliament	Years	Member	Party
Colchester—Hants; Riding created from Colchester and Hants—Kings
18th	1935–1940	Gordon Purdy	Liberal
19th	1940–1945	Gordon Purdy	Liberal
20th	1945–1949	Frank Thomas Stanfield	Progressive Conservative
21st	1949–1953	Frank Thomas Stanfield	Progressive Conservative
22nd	1953–1957	Gordon Purdy	Liberal
23rd	1957–1958	Cyril Kennedy	Progressive Conservative
24th	1958–1962	Cyril Kennedy	Progressive Conservative
25th	1962–1963	Cyril Kennedy	Progressive Conservative
26th	1963–1965	Cyril Kennedy	Progressive Conservative
27th	1965–1967	Cyril Kennedy	Progressive Conservative
27th	1967–1968	Robert Stanfield	Progressive Conservative
Riding dissolved into Annapolis Valley, Halifax—East Hants and Cumberland—Colchester North

== Election results ==
1935 Canadian federal election
Party	Candidate	Votes
Liberal	Gordon Purdy	9,608
Conservative	William Boardman Armstrong	9,402
Reconstruction	Wentworth Chauncy Miller	1,923

1940 Canadian federal election
Party	Candidate	Votes
Liberal	Gordon Purdy	12,328
National Government	Hadley B. Tremain	10,044

1945 Canadian federal election
Party	Candidate	Votes
Progressive Conservative	Frank Thomas Stanfield	11,141
Liberal	Gordon Purdy	11,133
Co-operative Commonwealth	Clifford Parker Wyman	2,165

1949 Canadian federal election
Party	Candidate	Votes
Progressive Conservative	Frank Thomas Stanfield	13,550
Liberal	Gordon Purdy	13,149
Co-operative Commonwealth	Frederick C.G. Scott	814

1953 Canadian federal election
Party	Candidate	Votes
Liberal	Gordon Purdy	12,660
Progressive Conservative	Fred M. Blois	12,271
Co-operative Commonwealth	Ralph Loomer	936

1957 Canadian federal election
Party	Candidate	Votes
Progressive Conservative	Cyril Kennedy	15,231
Liberal	Gordon T. Purdy	12,151
Co-operative Commonwealth	Ralph Loomer	912

1958 Canadian federal election
Party	Candidate	Votes
Progressive Conservative	Cyril Kennedy	15,653
Liberal	Robert Faulkner McLellan	11,779
Co-operative Commonwealth	Ralph Loomer	1,267

1962 Canadian federal election
Party	Candidate	Votes
Progressive Conservative	Cyril Kennedy	14,128
Liberal	Hector Hill	13,836
New Democratic	Lawrence C. Cameron	1,207
Unknown	K.Y. Parker	411

1963 Canadian federal election
Party	Candidate	Votes
Progressive Conservative	Cyril Kennedy	14,387
Liberal	Hector Hill	14,185
New Democratic	Laurence C. Cameron	822

1965 Canadian federal election
Party	Candidate	Votes
Progressive Conservative	Cyril Kennedy	15,250
Liberal	Hector Hill	12,962
New Democratic	Gordon S. Schurman	1,078
Independent	Robert Kirk	299

Canadian federal by-election, November 6, 1967 Resignation of Cyril Kennedy
Party	Candidate	Votes	%	±%
Progressive Conservative	Robert Stanfield	15,389	92.11	+40.57
Independent Liberal	Robert Kirk	1,098	6.57	
Independent	Elwood Smith	221	1.32	
Progressive Conservative hold		Swing		+40.57

== See also ==
- List of Canadian electoral districts
- Historical federal electoral districts of Canada
