= Alexis Caron =

Canadian politician

Alexis Pierre Caron
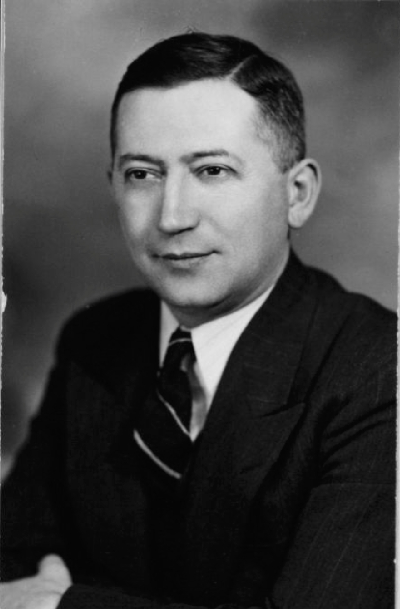

Member of the Legislative Assembly of Quebec for Hull
- In office 1935–1936
- Preceded by: Aimé Guertin
- Succeeded by: Alexandre Taché
- In office 1939–1944
- Preceded by: Alexandre Taché
- Succeeded by: Alexandre Taché

Mayor of Hull, Quebec
- In office April 1953 – April 1955

Member of the Canadian Parliament for Hull
- In office August 1953 – August 1966
- Preceded by: Alphonse Fournier
- Succeeded by: Pierre Caron

Personal details
- Born: 8 March 1899 Hull, Quebec, Canada
- Died: 31 August 1966 (aged 67) Ottawa, Ontario, Canada
- Party: Liberal
- Other political affiliations: Quebec Liberal Party
- Spouse: Germaine Thibault (m. 10 September 1924)
- Profession: insurance broker
- Committees: Federal: Chair, Standing Committee on Privileges and Elections (1963)
- Portfolio: Federal: Parliamentary Secretary to the Postmaster General (1964–1965); Parliamentary Secretary to the Prime Minister (1963–1964)

Alexis Pierre Caron (8 March 1899 – 31 August 1966) was a Canadian politician. Caron was a Liberal Party member of the House of Commons of Canada.

== Biography ==
He was born in Hull, Quebec and became an insurance broker by career.

He was first elected to the Legislative Assembly of Quebec at the Hull provincial riding in 1935 for the Quebec Liberal Party, then defeated in 1936, returned in 1939, defeated again in 1944 and 1948.

Caron was mayor of Hull, Quebec from April 1953 to April 1955. During this time, he entered national politics by winning the Hull riding in the 1953 federal election. He was then re-elected there in the 1957, 1958, 1962, 1963 and 1965 federal elections. Caron ended his Parliamentary career in 1966 shortly before his death during his term in the 27th Canadian Parliament.

Caron was Liberal party whip in 1963.
