= Bonavista—Twillingate =

Former federal electoral district in Newfoundland and Labrador, Canada

Newfoundland and Labrador electoral district

Defunct federal electoral district
- Legislature: House of Commons
- District created: 1949
- District abolished: 1966
- First contested: 1949
- Last contested: 1967 by-election

Bonavista—Twillingate was a federal electoral district in Newfoundland and Labrador, Canada, that was represented in the House of Commons of Canada from 1949 to 1968. This riding was created in 1949 when Newfoundland joined the Canadian Confederation.

The riding was abolished in 1966 when it was redistributed into Bonavista—Trinity—Conception, Burin—Burgeo, Gander—Twillingate and Grand Falls—White Bay—Labrador ridings. It initially consisted of the Districts of Twillingate, Fogo, Bonavista North, and Bonavista South excluding any part of the territory within a radius of five miles from the railway station at Gander.

In 1952, it was expanded to include the unorganized territory bounded on the North and West by the District of Grand Falls, on the South by the Districts of Burgeo and LaPoile and Fortune Bay-Hermitage, on the East by the Districts of Trinity North, Bonavista South and Bonavista North.

== Members of Parliament ==
This riding elected the following members of Parliament:

Parliament	Years	Member	Party
Bonavista—Twillingate
21st	1949–1953	Frederick Gordon Bradley	Liberal
22nd	1953–1957	Jack Pickersgill	Liberal
23rd	1957–1958	Jack Pickersgill	Liberal
24th	1958–1962	Jack Pickersgill	Liberal
25th	1962–1963	Jack Pickersgill	Liberal
26th	1963–1965	Jack Pickersgill	Liberal
27th	1965–1967	Jack Pickersgill	Liberal
27th	1967–1968	Charles Granger	Liberal
Riding dissolved into Bonavista—Trinity—Conception, Burin—Burgeo, Gander—Twillingate and Grand Falls—White Bay—Labrador

== Election results ==
1949 Canadian federal election
Party	Candidate	Votes
Liberal	Frederick Gordon Bradley	9,744
Progressive Conservative	Kenneth S.G. Dawe	1,415

1953 Canadian federal election
Party	Candidate	Votes
Liberal	Jack Pickersgill	10,072
Progressive Conservative	Edward Russell	2,564

1957 Canadian federal election
Party	Candidate	Votes
Liberal	Jack Pickersgill	9,158
Progressive Conservative	John Charles Pinsent	1,347

1958 Canadian federal election
Party	Candidate	Votes
Liberal	Jack Pickersgill	13,670
Progressive Conservative	Gerald M. Winter	4,323

1962 Canadian federal election
Party	Candidate	Votes
Liberal	Jack Pickersgill	11,530
Progressive Conservative	Whitfield Bannister	3,846

1963 Canadian federal election
Party	Candidate	Votes
Liberal	Jack Pickersgill	11,748
Progressive Conservative	Guy H. Eveleigh	2,448
Independent Liberal	Walter Herbert Davis	1,943

1965 Canadian federal election
Party	Candidate	Votes
Liberal	Jack Pickersgill	10,113
Progressive Conservative	William Q. Moss	3,687

By-election on 6 November 1967 On Mr. Pickersgill's, resignation, 19 September 1967
Party	Candidate	Votes
Liberal	Charles Granger	8,112
Progressive Conservative	Wilfred Nathan French	6,356
Independent	Samuel Drover	370

== See also ==
- List of Canadian electoral districts
- Historical federal electoral districts of Canada
