= Hilden, Nova Scotia =

Community in Nova Scotia, Canada

Coordinates: 45°18′5.24″N 63°17′59.85″W

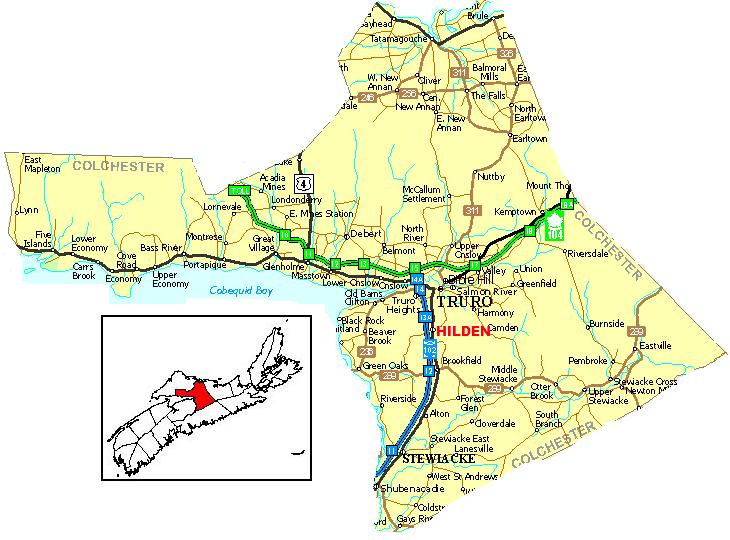
Location of Hilden within Colchester County, Nova Scotia.

Hilden is an unincorporated community in the Canadian province of Nova Scotia, located in Colchester County.

== History ==
Hilden was originally part of the Truro Township, settled by New England Planters in the 1780s.

At the time that the Intercolonial Railway began operation in December, 1858 the settlement was called "Halifax Road." A railway station was built, and about that time a meeting was called to name the settlement. "Clarksville" was suggested in honour of an old family in the area. The majority, however, decided on "Johnsons Crossing" in honour of a man who had his farm on the base line road which crossed the Halifax road at the railway.

By 1870, "Clarkesville" was used to refer to the western hill's settlement, and "Johnsons Crossing" to the eastern hill. By an act of the Nova Scotia House of Assembly in 1895, the name of the communities, along with "Slabtown" further south, was changed to Hilden.

== Demographics ==
The population of Hilden is approximately 1,200 and the community is located in Colchester Census Division C. The majority of the population live in three middle class residential subdivisions and the community functions as a suburb of the town of Truro.

== Education ==
The current Hilden Elementary School.

The first school in what became Hilden was a single-room building opened in 1870. This burnt in 1914, and a new building was erected on the same site the following year.

After education reforms in Nova Scotia in the 1940s, students from Hilden attended a new elementary school until their 5th year, and thence were transported to Brookfield for instruction.

A modern Hilden Elementary School was constructed in 1986 and currently serves students from Primary to Grade 6. Students then attend South Colchester Academy in Brookfield.

== Government ==
Hilden is located in District 3 of the Colchester Municipality, and is represented by first term(2008) Councillor Gerry Buott . Provincially, Hilden is in the riding of Colchester-Musquodoboit Valley and is represented by the Member of the Legislative Assembly Gary Burrill of the New Democratic Party. The community falls in the federal riding of Cumberland-Colchester-Musquodoboit Valley and is represented by Member of Parliament Scott Armstrong of the Conservative Party of Canada.
