= Hull—Aylmer =

Federal electoral district in Quebec, Canada

Quebec electoral district
- Interactive map of riding boundaries from the 2025 federal election
- Coordinates: 45.429°N 75.802°W

Federal electoral district
- Legislature: House of Commons
MP
Greg Fergus
Liberal
- District created: 1914
- First contested: 1917
- Last contested: 2025
- District webpage: profile, map

Demographics
- Population (2016): 105,419
- Electors (2019): 79,072
- Area (km²): 65
- Pop. density (per km²): 1,621.8
- Census division: Gatineau
- Census subdivision: Gatineau (part)

Hull—Aylmer (formerly known as Hull) is a federal electoral district in Quebec, Canada, which has been represented in the House of Commons since 1917.

It encompasses the parts of the sectors of Hull and Aylmer located in the city of Gatineau, Quebec. The neighbouring ridings are Gatineau, Pontiac—Kitigan Zibi, Kanata, Ottawa West—Nepean, Ottawa Centre, and Ottawa—Vanier—Gloucester.

Its member of Parliament (MP) has been Greg Fergus of the Liberal Party since 2015.

== Political geography ==
In the 2006 election, only five polls in the Aylmer sector did not vote Liberal. In the Hull sector, the Bloc Québécois performed very well in almost every neighbourhood. The Bloc's support was the most highly concentrated in the Wrightville, Mont-Bleu and Des Hautes Plaines neighbourhoods of Hull, but they also performed well in Le Plateau, Birch Manor, Jardins-Mackenzie-King, Jardins-Alexandre-Taché, Val-Tétreau, Lac-des-Fées and Ironside. Liberal support was constrained mostly to the neighbourhood of Parc-de-la-Montagne and the Île de Hull which was generally evenly split between the two parties. The Conservatives did not win a single poll in the riding, despite finishing ahead of the NDP which won two in Aylmer. The NDP won a poll in Lakeview Terrace as well as a poll in Parc-Glenwood, where it received less than 25% of the vote, despite winning it.

The strength of the Liberal party in this riding over so many years stems from the federal government influence generally seen in the city of Gatineau. This was the legacy of the federal bilingualism policy of the 1970s (which saw the liberal government of Pierre Trudeau in power) which resulted in the requirement for federal jobs to be distributed on both sides of the river. This was the impetus for the construction of the Portage complex in downtown Hull, which today dominates the commercial sector of the city. A significant number of residents in the riding work for the federal public service, with many working in the federal departments and agencies based in the Place du Portage buildings of downtown Hull. This is in addition to the residents who commute across the bridge to federal jobs in Ottawa.

== Demographics ==
According to the 2021 Canadian census; 2023 representation order

Racial groups: 71.7% White, 11.8% Black, 4.1% Indigenous, 3.7% Arab, 2.4% Latin American, 1.8% Chinese, 1.1% South Asian
Languages: 66.0% French, 22.6% English, 3.1% Arabic, 2.4% Spanish, 1.0% Portuguese, 1.0% Mandarin
Religions: 58.0% Christian (43.8% Catholic, 1.4% Christian Orthodox, 1.1% Anglican, 11.7% Other), 6.7% Muslim, 33.2% None
Median income: $45,600 (2020)
Average income: $54,450 (2020)

== History ==
The riding was created as Hull in 1914 from parts of Labelle and Wright ridings. It was renamed "Hull—Aylmer" in 1984.

With its large percentage of civil servants, the riding was a Liberal stronghold for almost a century, and the safest Liberal riding in the province outside Greater Montreal. Even when the rest of the province was turning its back on the Liberals, they survived in Hull—Aylmer in 1984, 2004 and 2006. In 2008, however, it was the only riding in Canada where four candidates received over 15% of the vote, and was the only riding in Quebec outside the Montreal area the Liberals won. In a major turnaround during the 2011 elections, however, the New Democratic Party won the riding as part of its sweep of the Outaouais. To date, this is the only time the Liberals have lost this riding in an election. The winner of that election, Nycole Turmel, was the interim leader of the NDP from July 28, 2011, until March 24, 2012, following the death of NDP leader Jack Layton. The only other time it was out of Liberal hands was from 1990 to 1993, when Gilles Rocheleau crossed the floor to the Bloc Québécois.

Hull—Aylmer lost territory to Pontiac during the 2012 electoral redistribution. It reverted to form at the 2015 election, when Liberal Greg Fergus handily defeated Turmel as part of the Liberals' clean sweep of the Outaouais.

Following the 2022 Canadian federal electoral redistribution, the riding lost the remainder of the Plateau neighbourhood to Pontiac—Kitigan Zibi.

=== Members of Parliament ===
This riding has elected the following members of Parliament:

| Parliament | Years | Member | Party |
|---|---|---|---|
Hull; Riding created from Labelle and Wright
| 13th | 1917–1921 | Joseph-Éloi Fontaine | Liberal |
| 14th | 1921–1925 | Joseph-Éloi Fontaine | Liberal |
| 15th | 1925–1926 | Joseph-Éloi Fontaine | Liberal |
| 16th | 1926–1930 | Joseph-Éloi Fontaine | Liberal |
| 17th | 1930–1935 | Alphonse Fournier | Liberal |
| 18th | 1935–1940 | Alphonse Fournier | Liberal |
| 19th | 1940–1945 | Alphonse Fournier | Liberal |
| 20th | 1945–1949 | Alphonse Fournier | Liberal |
| 21st | 1949–1953 | Alphonse Fournier | Liberal |
| 22nd | 1953–1957 | Alexis Caron | Liberal |
| 23rd | 1957–1958 | Alexis Caron | Liberal |
| 24th | 1958–1962 | Alexis Caron | Liberal |
| 25th | 1962–1963 | Alexis Caron | Liberal |
| 26th | 1963–1965 | Alexis Caron | Liberal |
| 27th | 1965–1966 | Alexis Caron | Liberal |
| 27th | 1966–1968 | Pierre Caron | Liberal |
| 28th | 1968–1972 | Gaston Isabelle | Liberal |
| 29th | 1972–1974 | Gaston Isabelle | Liberal |
| 30th | 1974–1979 | Gaston Isabelle | Liberal |
| 31st | 1979–1980 | Gaston Isabelle | Liberal |
| 32nd | 1980–1984 | Gaston Isabelle | Liberal |
Hull—Aylmer
| 33rd | 1984–1988 | Gaston Isabelle | Liberal |
| 34th | 1988–1990 | Gilles Rocheleau | Liberal |
| 34th | 1990–1990 | Gilles Rocheleau | Independent |
| 34th | 1990–1993 | Gilles Rocheleau | Bloc Québécois |
| 35th | 1993–1997 | Marcel Massé | Liberal |
| 36th | 1997–1999 | Marcel Massé | Liberal |
| 36th | 1999–2000 | Marcel Proulx | Liberal |
| 37th | 2000–2004 | Marcel Proulx | Liberal |
| 38th | 2004–2006 | Marcel Proulx | Liberal |
| 39th | 2006–2008 | Marcel Proulx | Liberal |
| 40th | 2008–2011 | Marcel Proulx | Liberal |
| 41st | 2011–2015 | Nycole Turmel | New Democratic |
| 42nd | 2015–2019 | Greg Fergus | Liberal |
| 43rd | 2019–2021 | Greg Fergus | Liberal |
| 44th | 2021–2025 | Greg Fergus | Liberal |
| 45th | 2025–present | Greg Fergus | Liberal |

== Election results ==
=== Hull—Aylmer, 1984–present ===
View source data.
Graph of election results in Hull—Aylmer (since 1984, minor parties that never got 2% of the vote or didn't run consistently are omitted)

2025 Canadian federal election
| Party | Candidate | Votes | % | ±% | Expenditures |
|---|---|---|---|---|---|
| Liberal | Greg Fergus | 31,978 | 62.11 | +9.65 | $38,557.74 |
| Conservative | Jill Declare | 8,727 | 16.95 | +6.17 | $7,992.90 |
| Bloc Québécois | Alice Grondin | 6,248 | 12.14 | –3.97 | $3,392.39 |
| New Democratic | Pascale Matecki | 2,855 | 5.55 | –7.19 | $17,999.40 |
| Green | Frédéric Morin-Paquette | 1,130 | 2.19 | –0.63 | $12,149.25 |
| People's | Jean-Jacques Desgranges | 341 | 0.66 | –2.99 | $2,031.47 |
| Marxist–Leninist | Alexandre Deschênes | 208 | 0.40 | N/A | $0.00 |
| Total valid votes | | 51,487 | 99.01 | +0.31 | $124,638.00 |
| Total rejected ballots | | 515 | 0.99 | –0.31 | |
| Turnout | | 52,002 | 69.39 | +3.28 | |
| Eligible voters | | 74,942 | | | |
| Liberal notional hold | | Swing | | +1.74 | |
Source: Elections Canada

2021 federal election redistributed results
| Party | Vote | % |
|---|---|---|
| Liberal | 25,446 | 52.46 |
| Bloc Québécois | 7,810 | 16.10 |
| New Democratic | 6,177 | 12.74 |
| Conservative | 5,229 | 10.78 |
| People's | 1,772 | 3.65 |
| Green | 1,368 | 2.82 |
| Free | 363 | 0.75 |
| Rhinoceros | 196 | 0.40 |
| Independent | 141 | 0.29 |
| Total valid votes | 48,502 | 98.70 |
| Rejected ballots | 637 | 1.30 |
| Registered voters/ estimated turnout | 74,327 | 66.11 |

2021 Canadian federal election
| Party | Candidate | Votes | % | ±% | Expenditures |
|---|---|---|---|---|---|
| Liberal | Greg Fergus | 26,892 | 52.5 | −1.6 | $63,261.55 |
| Bloc Québécois | Simon Provost | 8,323 | 16.2 | +1.6 | $12,271.08 |
| New Democratic | Samuel Gendron | 6,483 | 12.7 | −0.9 | $1,357.33 |
| Conservative | Sandrine Perion | 5,507 | 10.7 | +1.6 | $12,393.59 |
| People's | Eric Fleury | 1,864 | 3.6 | +2.4 | $2,637.53 |
| Green | Simon Gnocchini-Messier | 1,459 | 2.8 | −4.2 | $9,342.81 |
| Free | Josée Lafleur | 375 | 0.7 | N/A | $4,513.90 |
| Rhinoceros | Mike LeBlanc | 203 | 0.4 | ±0.0 | $0.00 |
| Independent | Catherine Dickins | 143 | 0.3 | N/A | $0.00 |
| Total valid votes/expense limit | | 51,249 | 98.7 | – | $109,916.55 |
| Total rejected ballots | | 666 | 1.3 | | |
| Turnout | | 51,915 | 66.5 | | |
| Registered voters | | 78,032 | | | |
| Liberal hold | | Swing | | −1.6 | |
Source: Elections Canada

2019 Canadian federal election
| Party | Candidate | Votes | % | ±% | Expenditures |
|---|---|---|---|---|---|
| Liberal | Greg Fergus | 29,732 | 54.1 | +2.73 | none listed |
| Bloc Québécois | Joanie Riopel | 8,011 | 14.6 | +8.06 | $2,949.94 |
| New Democratic | Nicolas Thibodeau | 7,467 | 13.6 | −17.92 | $26,504.52 |
| Conservative | Mike Duggan | 4,979 | 9.1 | +1.38 | $18,923.80 |
| Green | Josée Poirier Defoy | 3,869 | 7.0 | +5.13 | $9,958.48 |
| People's | Rowen Tanguay | 638 | 1.2 | – | $638.31 |
| Rhinoceros | Sébastien Grenier | 195 | 0.4 | – | $0.00 |
| Marxist–Leninist | Alexandre Deschênes | 102 | 0.2 | +0.02 | $0.00 |
| Total valid votes/expense limit | | 54,993 | 100.0 | | |
| Total rejected ballots | | 692 | | | |
| Turnout | | 55,685 | 70.4 | | |
| Eligible voters | | 79,072 | | | |
| Liberal hold | | Swing | | −2.67 | |
Source: Elections Canada

2015 Canadian federal election
| Party | Candidate | Votes | % | ±% | Expenditures |
|---|---|---|---|---|---|
| Liberal | Greg Fergus | 28,478 | 51.37 | +30.88 | $77,403.19 |
| New Democratic | Nycole Turmel | 17,472 | 31.52 | −27.26 | $73,823.88 |
| Conservative | Étienne Boulrice | 4,278 | 7.72 | -2.33 | $3,208.51 |
| Bloc Québécois | Maude Chouinard-Boucher | 3,625 | 6.54 | −2.14 | $5,830.63 |
| Green | Roger Fleury | 1,035 | 1.87 | −0.14 | $6,523.33 |
| Christian Heritage | Sean J. Mulligan | 291 | 0.52 | – | $5,299.81 |
| Independent | Luc Desjardins | 160 | 0.3 | – | – |
| Marxist–Leninist | Gabriel Girard | 101 | 0.18 | – | – |
| Total valid votes/Expense limit | | 55,440 | 100.0 | | $213,352.22 |
| Total rejected ballots | | 391 | – | – | |
| Turnout | | 55,831 | 70.8% | – | |
| Eligible voters | | 78,773 | | | |
| Liberal gain from New Democratic | | Swing | | 28.92% | |
Source: Elections Canada

2011 federal election redistributed results
| Party | Vote | % |
|---|---|---|
| New Democratic | 29,553 | 58.78 |
| Liberal | 10,302 | 20.49 |
| Conservative | 5,051 | 10.05 |
| Bloc Québécois | 4,362 | 8.68 |
| Green | 1,012 | 2.01 |

2011 Canadian federal election
| Party | Candidate | Votes | % | ±% | Expenditures |
|---|---|---|---|---|---|
| New Democratic | Nycole Turmel | 35,194 | 59.20 | +39.37 | |
| Liberal | Marcel Proulx | 12,051 | 20.27 | −17.20 | |
| Conservative | Nancy Brassard-Fortin | 6,058 | 10.19 | −4.94 | |
| Bloc Québécois | Dino Lemay | 5,019 | 8.44 | −13.63 | |
| Green | Roger Fleury | 1,125 | 1.89 | −3.37 | |
| Total valid votes/Expense limit | | 59,447 | 100.00 | | |
| Total rejected ballots | | 355 | 0.59 | | |
| Turnout | | 59,802 | 65.50 | | |
| Eligible voters | | 91,302 | – | – | |

2008 Canadian federal election
| Party | Candidate | Votes | % | ±% | Expenditures |
|---|---|---|---|---|---|
| Liberal | Marcel Proulx | 19,747 | 37.47 | +4.78 | $79,069 |
| Bloc Québécois | Raphaël Déry | 11,635 | 22.07 | −7.30 | $69,055 |
| New Democratic | Pierre Ducasse | 10,454 | 19.83 | +4.33 | $47,534 |
| Conservative | Paul Fréchette | 7,976 | 15.13 | −2.07 | $56,752 |
| Green | Frédéric Pouyot | 2,774 | 5.26 | +0.26 | $3,327 |
| Marxist–Leninist | Gabriel Girard-Bernier | 121 | 0.23 | 0.00 | |
| Total valid votes/Expense limit | | 52,707 | 100.00 | $89,492 | |
| Total rejected ballots | | – | – | | |
| Turnout | | – | – | | |
| Liberal hold | | Swing | +6.04 | | |

2006 Canadian federal election
| Party | Candidate | Votes | % | Expenditures |
|---|---|---|---|---|
| Liberal | Marcel Proulx | 17,576 | 32.67 | $74,347 |
| Bloc Québécois | Alain Charette | 15,788 | 29.35 | $36,796 |
| Conservative | Gilles Poirier | 9,284 | 17.26 | $57,405 |
| New Democratic | Pierre Laliberté | 8,334 | 15.49 | $28,016 |
| Green | Christian Doyle | 2,687 | 4.99 | $1,907 |
| Marxist–Leninist | Gabriel Girard-Bernier | 125 | 0.23 | $19 |
| Total valid votes/expenditure limit | | 53,794 | 100.00 | $82,541 |
| Total rejected ballots | | 323 | | |
| Turnout | | 54,117 | 64.25 | |
| Electors on the lists | | 84,233 | | |
Sources: Official Results, Elections Canada and Financial Returns, Elections Canada.

2004 Canadian federal election
| Party | Candidate | Votes | % | ±% | Expenditures |
|---|---|---|---|---|---|
| Liberal | Marcel Proulx | 20,135 | 41.87 | −9.53 | $61,882 |
| Bloc Québécois | Alain Charette | 15,626 | 32.49 | +9.41 | $22,285 |
| New Democratic | Pierre Laliberté | 5,709 | 11.87 | +8.38 | $23,285 |
| Conservative | Pierrette Bellefeuille | 3,963 | 8.24 | −9.72 | $11,618 |
| Green | Gail Walker | 2,561 | 5.33 | – | $2,380 |
| Marxist–Leninist | Christian Legeais | 98 | 0.20 | −0.04 | |
| Total valid votes/Expense limit | | 48,092 | 100.00 | $81,460 | |

Note: Conservative vote is compared to the total of the Canadian Alliance vote and Progressive Conservative vote in the 2000 election.

2000 Canadian federal election
| Party | Candidate | Votes | % | ±% |
|---|---|---|---|---|
| Liberal | Marcel Proulx | 22,385 | 51.40 | −2.63 |
| Bloc Québécois | Caroline Brouard | 10,051 | 23.08 | −2.40 |
| Progressive Conservative | Guy Dufort | 4,181 | 9.60 | +1.39 |
| Alliance | Michel Geisterfer | 3,639 | 8.36 | +7.36 |
| New Democratic | Peter Piening | 1,521 | 3.49 | −4.19 |
| Marijuana | Aubert Martins | 892 | 2.05 | |
| Natural Law | Rita Bouchard | 426 | 0.98 | +0.39 |
| Independent | Ron Gray | 184 | 0.42 | |
| Canadian Action | Robert Brooks | 167 | 0.38 | |
| Marxist–Leninist | Alexandre Legeais | 106 | 0.24 | |
| Total valid votes | | 43,552 | 100.00 | |

Note: Canadian Alliance vote is compared to the Reform vote in 1999 by-election.

Canadian federal by-election, 15 November 1999
| Party | Candidate | Votes | % | ±% |
|---|---|---|---|---|
Resignation of Marcel Massé, 10 September 1999
| Liberal | Marcel Proulx | 9,532 | 54.03 | −0.08 |
| Bloc Québécois | Robert Bélanger | 4,495 | 25.48 | +4.70 |
| Progressive Conservative | Richard St-Cyr | 1,448 | 8.21 | −9.51 |
| New Democratic | Alain Cossette | 1,356 | 7.69 | +4.93 |
| Green | Gail Walker | 307 | 1.74 | +0.51 |
| Christian Heritage | Ron Gray | 176 | 1.00 | +0.42 |
| Reform | Luiz Da Silva | 175 | 0.99 | −0.97 |
| Natural Law | Jean-Claude Pommet | 103 | 0.58 | +0.03 |
| Independent | John C. Turmel | 51 | 0.29 | |
| Total valid votes | | 17,643 | 100.00 | |

1997 Canadian federal election
| Party | Candidate | Votes | % | ±% |
|---|---|---|---|---|
| Liberal | Marcel Massé | 25,835 | 54.11 | +0.85 |
| Bloc Québécois | Ginette Tétreault | 9,922 | 20.78 | −6.42 |
| Progressive Conservative | Stéphane Rondeau | 8,461 | 17.72 | +11.55 |
| New Democratic | Peter Piening | 1,317 | 2.76 | +0.20 |
| Reform | Camille Fortin | 935 | 1.96 | |
| Green | Gail Walker | 586 | 1.23 | +0.34 |
| Christian Heritage | Ron Gray | 275 | 0.58 | |
| Natural Law | Robert Mayer | 266 | 0.56 | −0.21 |
| Marxist–Leninist | Pierre Soublière | 151 | 0.32 | +0.01 |
| Total valid votes | | 47,748 | 100.00 | |

1993 Canadian federal election
| Party | Candidate | Votes | % | ±% |
|---|---|---|---|---|
| Liberal | Marcel Massé | 27,988 | 53.26 | +3.43 |
| Bloc Québécois | Gilles Rocheleau | 14,293 | 27.20 | |
| Independent | Tony Cannavino | 4,583 | 8.72 | |
| Progressive Conservative | Pierre Chénier | 3,244 | 6.17 | −25.70 |
| New Democratic | Francine Bourque | 1,346 | 2.56 | −12.83 |
| Green | George Halpern | 468 | 0.89 | |
| Natural Law | Robert Mayer | 401 | 0.76 | |
| Marxist–Leninist | Françoise Roy | 162 | 0.31 | |
| Abolitionist | Linda Dubois | 63 | 0.12 | |
| Total valid votes | | 52,548 | 100.00 | |

1988 Canadian federal election
| Party | Candidate | Votes | % | ±% |
|---|---|---|---|---|
| Liberal | Gilles Rocheleau | 23,218 | 49.83 | +9.26 |
| Progressive Conservative | Nicole Moreault | 14,849 | 31.87 | −5.15 |
| New Democratic | Danielle Lapointe-Vienneau | 7,170 | 15.39 | −4.23 |
| Rhinoceros | Denis Le Citron Patenaude | 661 | 1.42 | |
| Independent | Glen Kealey | 559 | 1.20 | |
| Independent | Serge Lafortune | 134 | 0.29 | |
| Total valid votes | | 46,591 | 100.00 | |

1984 Canadian federal election
| Party | Candidate | Votes | % | ±% |
|---|---|---|---|---|
| Liberal | Gaston Isabelle | 17,058 | 40.58 | −27.55 |
| Progressive Conservative | Pierre Ménard | 15,563 | 37.02 | +31.74 |
| New Democratic | Jacques Audette | 8,247 | 19.62 | −4.91 |
| Parti nationaliste | Carol Anctil | 1,015 | 2.41 | |
| Commonwealth of Canada | Émile Chartrand | 156 | 0.37 | |
| Total valid votes | | 42,039 | 100.00 | |

=== Hull, 1917–1984 ===
View source data.
Graph of election results in Hull (1921-1980, minor parties that never got 2% of the vote or didn't run consistently are omitted)

1980 Canadian federal election
| Party | Candidate | Votes | % | ±% |
|---|---|---|---|---|
| Liberal | Gaston Isabelle | 27,938 | 68.13 | -2.04 |
| New Democratic | Michel Légère | 10,059 | 24.53 | +7.97 |
| Progressive Conservative | Ronald Lefebvre | 2,167 | 5.28 | -0.07 |
| Rhinoceros | Sylvain Dompierre | 598 | 1.46 | -0.47 |
| Independent | Marc Bonhomme | 174 | 0.42 | |
| Marxist–Leninist | Pierre J.G. Soublière | 70 | 0.17 | -0.07 |
| Total valid votes | | 41,006 | 100.00 | |

1979 Canadian federal election
| Party | Candidate | Votes | % | ±% |
|---|---|---|---|---|
| Liberal | Gaston Isabelle | 30,413 | 70.18 | -1.04 |
| New Democratic | Michel Légère | 7,175 | 16.56 | +8.36 |
| Social Credit | Jean Tessier | 2,357 | 5.44 | -3.29 |
| Progressive Conservative | Jean-Paul St-Amand | 2,320 | 5.35 | -5.26 |
| Rhinoceros | Pierre Cantin | 835 | 1.93 | |
| Union populaire | René Coté | 132 | 0.30 | |
| Marxist–Leninist | Pierre Soublière | 106 | 0.24 | |
| Total valid votes | | 43,338 | 100.00 | |

1974 Canadian federal election
| Party | Candidate | Votes | % | ±% |
|---|---|---|---|---|
| Liberal | Gaston Isabelle | 26,872 | 71.21 | +6.27 |
| Progressive Conservative | Lucille Hodgins | 4,006 | 10.62 | -0.39 |
| Social Credit | René Ouellette | 3,292 | 8.72 | -4.13 |
| New Democratic | Carole Campeau Fortin | 3,093 | 8.20 | -1.81 |
| Independent | Raoul Gendron | 472 | 1.25 | +0.06 |
| Total valid votes | | 37,735 | 100.00 | |

1972 Canadian federal election
| Party | Candidate | Votes | % | ±% |
|---|---|---|---|---|
| Liberal | Gaston Isabelle | 24,630 | 64.94 | -3.78 |
| Social Credit | Yvon Boisclair | 4,874 | 12.85 | -3.03 |
| Progressive Conservative | André Lacroix | 4,173 | 11.00 | +0.06 |
| New Democratic | Carole Fortin | 3,796 | 10.01 | 6.57 |
| Independent | Raoul Gendron | 453 | 1.19 | 0.19 |
| Total valid votes | | 37,926 | 100.00 | |

Note: Social Credit vote is compared to Ralliement créditiste vote in the 1968 election.

1968 Canadian federal election
| Party | Candidate | Votes | % | ±% |
|---|---|---|---|---|
| Liberal | Gaston Isabelle | 22,982 | 68.72 | +16.48 |
| Ralliement créditiste | Joseph-René Villeneuve | 5,311 | 15.88 | -22.53 |
| Progressive Conservative | Jean-Marie Séguin | 3,661 | 10.95 | +6.81 |
| New Democratic | Richard Thibault | 1,151 | 3.44 | -0.56 |
| Independent Liberal | Raoul Gendron | 337 | 1.01 | -0.20 |
| Total valid votes | | 33,442 | 100.00 | |

Canadian federal by-election, 29 May 1967
| Party | Candidate | Votes | % | ±% |
|---|---|---|---|---|
On Mr. Caron's death, 31 August 1966
| Liberal | Pierre Caron | 11,854 | 52.25 | -2.44 |
| Ralliement créditiste | René Villeneuve | 8,715 | 38.41 | +8.36 |
| Progressive Conservative | Jean-Claude Émond | 939 | 4.14 | -1.61 |
| New Democratic | Richard Thibault | 907 | 4.00 | -2.94 |
| Independent Liberal | Raoul Gendron | 274 | 1.21 | |
| Total valid votes | | 22,689 | 100.00 | |

1965 Canadian federal election
| Party | Candidate | Votes | % | ±% |
|---|---|---|---|---|
| Liberal | Alexis Caron | 17,832 | 54.68 | +1.71 |
| Ralliement créditiste | Marcel Clément | 9,798 | 30.05 | -6.59 |
| New Democratic | René Desjardins | 2,261 | 6.93 | +4.53 |
| Progressive Conservative | Gérard Girouard | 1,873 | 5.74 | -2.24 |
| Independent Liberal | Gertrude Laflèche | 692 | 2.12 | |
| Independent Liberal | Robert Lawlis | 154 | 0.47 | |
| Total valid votes | | 32,610 | 100.00 | |

Note: Ralliement créditiste vote is compared to Social Credit vote in the 1963 election.

1963 Canadian federal election
| Party | Candidate | Votes | % | ±% |
|---|---|---|---|---|
| Liberal | Alexis Caron | 19,667 | 52.97 | +4.81 |
| Social Credit | Marcel Clément | 13,603 | 36.64 | +5.37 |
| Progressive Conservative | Jules Barrière | 2,965 | 7.99 | -9.77 |
| New Democratic | Claude Morissette | 891 | 2.40 | -0.40 |
| Total valid votes | | 37,126 | 100.00 | |

1962 Canadian federal election
| Party | Candidate | Votes | % | ±% |
|---|---|---|---|---|
| Liberal | Alexis Caron | 17,932 | 48.17 | -8.02 |
| Social Credit | Marcel Clément | 11,642 | 31.27 | +24.34 |
| Progressive Conservative | Armand Turpin | 6,612 | 17.76 | -18.15 |
| New Democratic | Hubert Boyer | 1,043 | 2.80 | |
| Total valid votes | | 37,229 | 100.00 | |

1958 Canadian federal election
| Party | Candidate | Votes | % | ±% |
|---|---|---|---|---|
| Liberal | Alexis Caron | 20,132 | 56.18 | +11.52 |
| Progressive Conservative | Lionel Mougeot | 12,869 | 35.91 | +21.78 |
| Social Credit | Marcellin Clément | 2,484 | 6.93 | +0.15 |
| Independent Liberal | Raoul Gendron | 348 | 0.97 | |
| Total valid votes | | 35,833 | 100.00 | |

1957 Canadian federal election
| Party | Candidate | Votes | % | ±% |
|---|---|---|---|---|
| Liberal | Alexis Caron | 15,551 | 44.66 | -30.46 |
| Independent Liberal | Raymond Brunet | 11,981 | 34.41 | |
| Progressive Conservative | Avila Labelle | 4,922 | 14.14 | -7.38 |
| Social Credit | Marcellin Clément | 2,363 | 6.79 | |
| Total valid votes | | 34,817 | 100.00 | |

1953 Canadian federal election
| Party | Candidate | Votes | % | ±% |
|---|---|---|---|---|
| Liberal | Alexis Caron | 21,785 | 75.13 | +9.60 |
| Progressive Conservative | Daniel Lafortune | 6,239 | 21.52 | -3.57 |
| Co-operative Commonwealth | Laurent Larose | 707 | 2.44 | -0.30 |
| Labor–Progressive | Ernest Gervais | 266 | 0.92 | |
| Total valid votes | | 28,997 | 100.00 | |

1949 Canadian federal election
| Party | Candidate | Votes | % | ±% |
|---|---|---|---|---|
| Liberal | Alphonse Fournier | 18,446 | 65.53 | +6.30 |
| Progressive Conservative | Jacques Boucher | 7,060 | 25.08 | -11.45 |
| Union des électeurs | Cécile Brunet | 1,871 | 6.65 | +4.30 |
| Co-operative Commonwealth | Laurent-Joseph Larose | 771 | 2.74 | +0.85 |
| Total valid votes | | 28,148 | 100.00 | |

1945 Canadian federal election
| Party | Candidate | Votes | % | ±% |
|---|---|---|---|---|
| Liberal | Alphonse Fournier | 15,012 | 59.23 | +8.66 |
| Progressive Conservative | Armand Turpin | 9,258 | 36.53 | |
| Union des électeurs | Alcide Whitmore | 596 | 2.35 | -29.48 |
| Co-operative Commonwealth | François-Joseph Gavard | 478 | 1.89 | |
| Total valid votes | | 25,344 | 100.00 | |

Note: Union des électeurs vote is compared to New Democracy vote in 1940 election. Social Credit vote is compared to New Democracy vote in 1940 election. Labour-Progressive vote is compared to Communist vote in 1940 election.

1940 Canadian federal election
| Party | Candidate | Votes | % | ±% |
|---|---|---|---|---|
| Liberal | Alphonse Fournier | 11,253 | 50.57 | +5.73 |
| New Democracy | Armand Turpin | 7,083 | 31.83 | |
| Labour | Théodore Lambert | 3,916 | 17.60 | |
| Total valid votes | | 22,252 | 100.00 | |

1935 Canadian federal election
| Party | Candidate | Votes | % | ±% |
|---|---|---|---|---|
| Liberal | Alphonse Fournier | 9,370 | 44.84 | -23.13 |
| Reconstruction | Aimé Guertin | 5,244 | 25.09 | |
| Independent Liberal | Joseph Édouard Laflamme | 3,390 | 16.22 | |
| Conservative | Rodolphe Moreau | 2,894 | 13.85 | -18.18 |
| Total valid votes | | 20,898 | 100.00 | |

1930 Canadian federal election
| Party | Candidate | Votes | % | ±% |
|---|---|---|---|---|
| Liberal | Alphonse Fournier | 12,543 | 67.97 | -15.33 |
| Conservative | Jean-Noël Beauchamp | 5,911 | 32.03 | +15.33 |
| Total valid votes | | 18,454 | 100.00 | |

1926 Canadian federal election
| Party | Candidate | Votes | % | ±% |
|---|---|---|---|---|
| Liberal | Joseph-Éloi Fontaine | 10,899 | 83.30 | +14.10 |
| Conservative | François-Albert Dumas | 2,185 | 16.70 | -14.10 |
| Total valid votes | | 13,084 | 100.00 | |

1925 Canadian federal election
| Party | Candidate | Votes | % | ±% |
|---|---|---|---|---|
| Liberal | Joseph-Éloi Fontaine | 10,248 | 69.20 | -13.50 |
| Conservative | Louis Cousineau | 4,561 | 30.80 | |
| Total valid votes | | 14,809 | 100.00 | |

1921 Canadian federal election
| Party | Candidate | Votes | % |
|---|---|---|---|
| Liberal | Joseph-Éloi Fontaine | 11,998 | 82.70 |
| Progressive | Sylvio Lafortune | 2,510 | 17.30 |
| Total valid votes | | 14,508 | 100.00 |

1917 Canadian federal election
| Party | Candidate | Votes |
|---|---|---|
| Opposition (Laurier Liberals) | Joseph-Éloi Fontaine | acclaimed |

== See also ==
- List of Canadian electoral districts
- Historical federal electoral districts of Canada

Parliament of Canada
| Preceded by Toronto—Danforth | Constituency represented by the leader of the Opposition; 2011–2012 | Succeeded by Outremont |
| Preceded by Bécancour—Nicolet—Saurel | Constituency represented by the speaker of the House of Commons; 2023–2025 | Succeeded by Lac-Saint-Louis |
