= Pierre Caron (politician) =

Canadian politician

Member of Parliament for Hull
- In office May 1967 – April 1968

Personal details
- Born: 31 August 1936 (age 89) Hull, Quebec
- Party: Liberal
- Profession: insurance broker

Pierre Caron (born 31 August 1936 in Hull, Quebec (now Gatineau, Quebec) was a Liberal party member of the House of Commons of Canada. He was an insurance broker by career.

He was first elected at the Hull riding in a 29 May 1967 by-election, following the death of his father, Alexis Caron. After completing his term in the 27th Parliament, Pierre Caron left national office and did not seek further re-election to Parliament.
