= Jack Pickersgill =

Canadian politician

The Right Honourable Jack Pickersgill PC CC
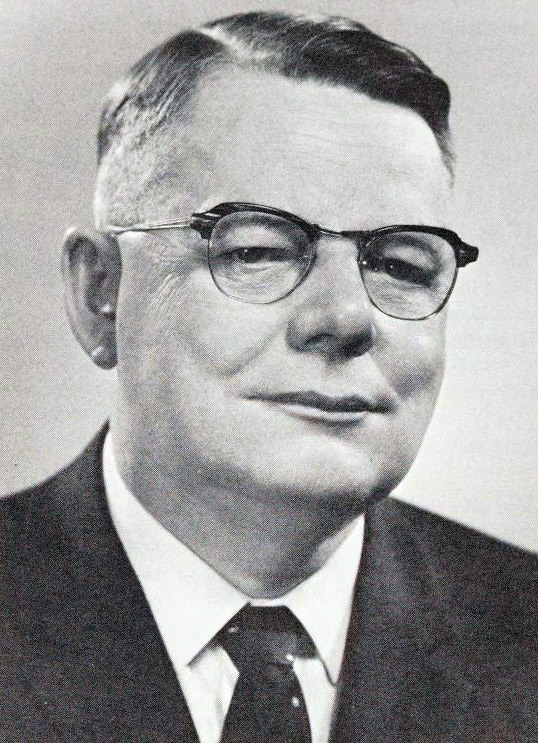
- Pickersgill, c. 1960s

Minister of Transport
- In office 3 February 1964 – 18 September 1967
- Prime Minister: Lester B. Pearson
- Preceded by: George McIlraith
- Succeeded by: Paul Hellyer

Secretary of State for Canada
- In office 22 April 1963 – 2 February 1964
- Prime Minister: Lester B. Pearson
- Preceded by: Ernest Halpenny
- Succeeded by: Maurice Lamontagne
- In office 12 June 1953 – 30 June 1954
- Prime Minister: Louis St. Laurent
- Preceded by: Frederick Gordon Bradley
- Succeeded by: Roch Pinard

Leader of the Government in the House of Commons
- In office 16 May 1963 – 21 December 1963
- Prime Minister: Lester B. Pearson
- Preceded by: Gordon Churchill
- Succeeded by: Guy Favreau

Minister of Citizenship and Immigration
- In office 1 July 1954 – 20 June 1957
- Prime Minister: Louis St. Laurent
- Preceded by: Walter Edward Harris
- Succeeded by: Davie Fulton (Acting)

Member of Parliament for Bonavista—Twillingate
- In office 10 August 1953 – 18 September 1967
- Preceded by: Frederick Gordon Bradley
- Succeeded by: Charles Granger

Personal details
- Born: 23 June 1905 Wyecombe, Ontario, Canada
- Died: 14 November 1997 (aged 92) Ottawa, Ontario, Canada
- Party: Liberal
- Spouse(s): Beatrice Young (m. 1936; died 1938) Mary Margaret Beattie (m. 1939)
- Children: 4
- Education: University of Manitoba; New College, Oxford
- Occupation: Lecturer; Civil Servant

John Whitney Pickersgill PC CC (23 June 1905 – 14 November 1997) was a Canadian civil servant and politician. He was born in Ontario, but was raised in Manitoba. He was Clerk of the Privy Council in the early 1950s. He was first elected to federal parliament in 1953, representing a Newfoundland electoral district and serving in Prime Minister Louis St. Laurent's cabinet. In the mid-1960s, he served again in cabinet, this time under Prime Minister Lester B. Pearson. Pickersgill resigned from Parliament in 1967 to become the president of the Canadian Transport Commission. He was awarded the highest level of the Order of Canada in 1970. He wrote several books on Canadian history. He died in 1997 in Ottawa.

== Early years ==
Pickersgill was born in Wyecombe, Ontario, on June 23, 1905, the son of Frank Allan Pickersgill (1877-) and Sarah Smith (1878-). His parents were born in Ontario. When he was a young child, the family moved to Ashern, Manitoba, where his father was a farmer. John was the older brother of Thomas, Walter, Bessie, and Frank Pickersgill, all of whom were born in Manitoba. He was educated at the University of Manitoba and at the University of Oxford, and he taught history in Winnipeg.

On July 3, 1936, at Emmanuel College Chapel, Toronto, J.W. Pickersgill married Beatrice Landon Young (1913-1938). A graduate of the University of Manitoba, Beatrice was born in Winnipeg, the daughter of Dr. Fred Armstrong Young (1875-1964), MD, and Landon (Wright) Young (1878-1931). The marriage ceremony was attended only by immediate family members. A gravestone in Old Kildonan Cemetery in Winnipeg memorializes the 1938 death of Beatrice, "wife of John W. Pickersgill."

== Senior civil servant ==
He joined the Department of External Affairs in Ottawa and soon worked at the Prime Minister's Office as Assistant Private Secretary to Prime Minister William Lyon Mackenzie King. In 1945, he became Special Assistant to the Prime Minister and was officially in charge of the Prime Minister's Office. He stayed on to work for King's successor, Louis St. Laurent, and became Clerk of the Privy Council in 1952. Pickersgill was a senior and trusted adviser to both Prime Ministers: "Clear it with Jack" was the byword on Parliament Hill for years.

== MP and Cabinet Minister ==
Pickersgill entered the House of Commons of Canada as Liberal Member of Parliament (MP) for Bonavista-Twillingate, Newfoundland, after the 1953 election. Pickersgill had become involved in the politics of Newfoundland at the informal request of leading federal politicians in the late 1940s. He was instrumental in supporting Newfoundland's pro-Confederation movement although he had no prior connection to the island.

He entered the Canadian Cabinet as Secretary of State for Canada in 1953 and was named Minister for Citizenship and Immigration in 1954. In 1956, when he addressed First Nations at a banquet following a reburial ceremony, he suggested that the First Nations chiefs present should take jobs that would make them independent of government support.

When the Liberal government was defeated in the 1957 election, Pickersgill was re-elected as an MP. He became a leading tormentor of the new government of John Diefenbaker from the opposition benches. With the 1963 election and the coming to power of Lester Pearson as Prime Minister, Pickersgill returned to Cabinet, first as Secretary of State for Canada and Government House Leader and then as Minister of Transport. In 1967, he retired from politics to become president of the Canadian Transport Commission.

== Honours ==
He was sworn in as a member of the Queen's Privy Council for Canada on 12 June 1953. This gave him the Honorific Prefix "The Honourable" and the Post Nominal Letters "PC" for Life. On 18 December 1970, he was appointed as a Companion of the Order of Canada and was invested into the order on 31 March 1971. This gave him the Post Nominal Letters "CC" for Life. He was later bestowed the Honorific Prefix "The Right Honourable", usually reserved in Canada for Prime Ministers, Governors-General and Chief Justices, as recognition of his service.

As a currently serving Member of Parliament He received the Canadian Centennial Medal in 1967. As a recipient of the Order of Canada He received the Canadian Version of the Queen Elizabeth II Silver Jubilee Medal in 1977.

He was awarded the Honorary degree of Doctor of Laws (LL.D) by the University of Manitoba on 25 May 1967. He was awarded an Honorary Doctorate by the University of Winnipeg in 1982.

== Writings ==
He and D. F. Forster authored the four volumes of The Mackenzie King Record, which was based on King's diaries. Pickersgill was a literary executor for King's diaries. Pickersgill is also the author of three political memoirs — My Years with Louis St. Laurent (ISBN 9780802022158), The Road Back (ISBN 9780802025982), and Seeing Canada Whole (ISBN 9781550410693) — as well as a history of the Liberal Party.

- The Mackenzie King record (1960) online

== Archives ==
There is a Jack Pickersgill fonds at Library and Archives Canada.

Parliament of Canada
| Preceded by Frederick Gordon Bradley | Member of Parliament from Bonavista—Twillingate; 1953–1967 | Succeeded by Charles Ronald McKay Granger |
Political offices
| Preceded by Gordon Minto Churchill | Leader of the Government in the House of Commons; 1963 | Succeeded by Guy Favreau |
| Preceded by Lionel Chevrier | Liberal Party House Leader; 1963 | Succeeded by Guy Favreau |
