= Charles Granger (politician) =

Canadian politician (1912–1995)

The Honourable Charles Granger PC OC
- Official 1966 portrait

Member of Parliament for Bonavista—Twillingate
- In office November 6, 1967 – June 24, 1968
- Preceded by: Jack Pickersgill
- Succeeded by: Riding dissolved

Member of the Newfoundland House of Assembly for Gander
- In office September 8, 1966 – September 25, 1967
- Preceded by: Beaton Abbott
- Succeeded by: Harold Collins

Member of Parliament for Grand Falls—White Bay—Labrador
- In office March 31, 1958 – August 1, 1966
- Preceded by: Thomas Ashbourne
- Succeeded by: Andrew Chatwood

President of the Fishermen's Protective Union
- In office May 15, 1948 – 1954
- Preceded by: Kenneth M. Brown
- Succeeded by: Gilbert Yetman

Personal details
- Born: August 12, 1912 Catalina, Newfoundland
- Died: April 22, 1995 (aged 82)
- Party: Liberal
- Spouse: Elizabeth Jane French (m. 1950)
- Children: 4

Charles Ronald McKay Granger PC OC (August 12, 1912 – April 22, 1995) was a Canadian politician from Newfoundland.

== Early life ==
Born in Catalina, Newfoundland, one of two children of David Charles and Emilie Sarah (Bursey) Granger, Granger was educated at St. Peter's Anglican High School.

== Politics ==
Granger became involved with the Fishermen's Protective Union (FPU) at a young age. He was the editor for the organization's newspaper, The Fishermen's Advocate, beginning in 1940. Granger was elected as the FPU's president in 1948 and he remained involved with the organization for several years.

Granger was elected as a Liberal Member of Parliament (MP) for the riding of Grand Falls—White Bay—Labrador in the 1958 election. He was re-elected in 1962, 1963, and 1965.

In August 1966, he resigned from the House of Commons of Canada and became a Member of the House of Assembly (MHA) for the district of Gander in the Newfoundland and Labrador House of Assembly. He was appointed Minister of Labrador Affairs in the cabinet of Joey Smallwood.

Granger resigned from the House of Assembly on September 25, 1967, and returned to the House of Commons after winning a 1967 federal by-election in the riding of Bonavista—Twillingate following the retirement of Cabinet minister Jack Pickersgill. Granger won the seat and was appointed Minister without Portfolio in the cabinet of Prime Minister Lester Pearson and kept the position when Pierre Trudeau became Prime Minister of Canada the following year. However, he was defeated by John Howard Lundrigan in the 1968 election.

== Later life ==
Following his defeat, Granger was a vice-president of Shaheen Natural Resources Company from 1968 to 1975.

In 1994, he was made an Officer of the Order of Canada.
