= Joseph Gauthier =

Joseph Gauthier may refer to:

- Joseph Gauthier (Quebec MLA) (1877–1934), member of the Legislative Assembly of Quebec
- Joseph Gauthier (Quebec MP) (1842–1911), Quebec farmer and member of the Canadian House of Commons
