= Raynault =

Raynault is a French surname. Notable people with the surname include:

- Adhémar Raynault (1891–1984), Canadian politician
- Francine Raynault (born 1945), Canadian politician
- Ginette Raynault (born 1946), Canadian author, composer, singer, and actress
