= Guy Favreau =

Canadian politician (1917–1967)

The Honourable Guy Favreau PC QC
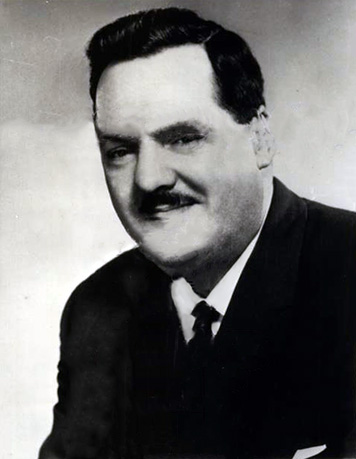
- Favreau, c. 1966

President of the Privy Council
- In office 7 July 1965 – 3 April 1967
- Prime Minister: Lester B. Pearson
- Preceded by: George McIlraith
- Succeeded by: Walter L. Gordon

Minister of Justice Attorney General of Canada
- In office 3 February 1964 – 29 June 1965
- Prime Minister: Lester B. Pearson
- Preceded by: Lionel Chevrier
- Succeeded by: George McIlraith (acting)

Leader of the Government in the House of Commons
- In office 18 February 1964 – 29 October 1964
- Prime Minister: Lester B. Pearson
- Preceded by: Jack Pickersgill
- Succeeded by: George McIlraith

Minister of Manpower and Immigration
- In office 22 April 1963 – 2 February 1964
- Prime Minister: Lester B. Pearson
- Preceded by: Dick Bell
- Succeeded by: René Tremblay

Member of Parliament for Papineau
- In office 8 April 1963 – 3 April 1967
- Preceded by: Adrien Meunier
- Succeeded by: André Ouellet

Personal details
- Born: 20 May 1917 Montreal, Quebec, Canada
- Died: 11 July 1967 (aged 50) Montreal, Quebec, Canada
- Party: Liberal
- Spouse: Francoise Laflamme (m. 1944)
- Children: 4
- Education: Université de Montréal (BA, LLB)
- Profession: Lecturer; legal counsel; lawyer

Guy Favreau PC QC (20 May 1917 – 11 July 1967) was a Canadian lawyer, politician and judge.

== Biography ==
Born in Montreal, Quebec, the son of Léopold Favreau and Béatrice Gagnon, he obtained a Bachelor of Arts and an LL.B. from the Université de Montréal. He was called to the Bar of Quebec in 1940. He worked as a lawyer in Montreal from 1942 to 1952. In 1952, he became a member of the Restrictive Trade Practices Commission in Ottawa. In 1955, he became Assistant Deputy Minister of Justice. He helped to create the Faculty of Civil Law at the University of Ottawa and taught there as well. In 1960, he returned to Montreal to work as a private lawyer.

He was elected as a Liberal in the riding of Papineau in the 1963 election, and was re-elected in 1965. He was Minister of Citizenship and Immigration (1963–1964), Minister of Justice and Attorney General of Canada (1964–1965), President of the Privy Council (1965–1967), Minister of Indian Affairs (1963–1964) and Registrar General of Canada (1966–1967). As well, he was Leader of the Government in the House of Commons (1964) and Liberal Party House Leader (1964). Allegations regarding involvement in the prison escape of Lucien Rivard had led to his downfall as Attorney General.

He was appointed a judge of the Quebec Superior Court on April 17, 1967, but he died shortly afterward. He was entombed at the Notre Dame des Neiges Cemetery in Montreal.

The Complexe Guy-Favreau, the federal government's main building in Montreal, was built in 1983 and is named in his honour.

Political offices
Preceded by Dick Bell	Minister of Citizenship and Immigration; 1963–1964	Succeeded by René Tremblay
Preceded by Lionel Chevrier	Minister of Justice; 1964–1965	Succeeded by George McIlraith
Preceded by Jack Pickersgill	Leader of the Government in the House of Commons; 1964	Succeeded by George McIlraith
Preceded by George McIlraith	President of the Privy Council; 1965–1967	Succeeded by Walter Gordon
Preceded by Judy LaMarsh	Registrar General of Canada; 1966–1967	Succeeded by John Turner
