= Gaspard Fauteux =

Canadian politician (1898–1963)

The Honourable Gaspard Fauteux PC
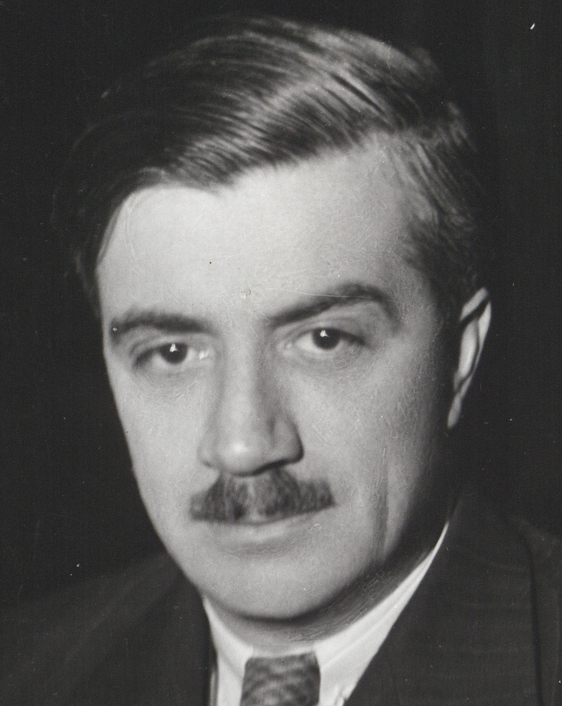

19th Lieutenant Governor of Quebec
- In office October 3, 1950 – February 14, 1958
- Monarchs: George VI; Elizabeth II
- Governors General: The Viscount Alexander of Tunis; Vincent Massey
- Premier: Maurice Duplessis
- Preceded by: Eugène Fiset
- Succeeded by: Onésime Gagnon

21st Speaker of the House of Commons of Canada
- In office September 6, 1945 – September 14, 1949
- Preceded by: James Allison Glen
- Succeeded by: William Ross Macdonald

Member of the Canadian Parliament for St. Mary
- In office February 9, 1942 – October 3, 1950
- Preceded by: Hermas Deslauriers
- Succeeded by: Hector Dupuis

Member of the Legislative Assembly of Quebec for Montréal–Sainte-Marie
- In office August 24, 1931 – November 25, 1935
- Preceded by: Camillien Houde
- Succeeded by: Candide Rochefort

Personal details
- Born: August 27, 1898 Saint-Hyacinthe, Quebec
- Died: March 29, 1963 (aged 64) Montreal, Quebec
- Party: Liberal
- Other political affiliations: Quebec Liberal Party
- Relations: Honoré Mercier, Grandfather; Joseph Godbout, Grandfather; Lomer Gouin, Uncle; Claude Castonguay, Son-in-law

Gaspard Fauteux, PC (August 27, 1898 – March 29, 1963) was a Canadian parliamentarian, Speaker of the House of Commons of Canada (1945–1949), and the 19th Lieutenant Governor of Quebec (1950–1958).

He was born in S^{t}-Hyacinthe, Quebec, to a political family. His grandfather, Honoré Mercier and his uncle, Lomer Gouin, were both former Premiers of Quebec. His grandmother's second husband was Liberal Member of Parliament (MP) and later Senator Joseph Godbout. His brother was the judge Gérald Fauteux.

Fauteux married Marguerite Barré, daughter of the Canadian artist and animator Raoul Barré, on September 18, 1923. The couple had 4 children; Roger, Paul, Marie (Mimi) and Gaspard Jr.

A dentist by training and then a businessman, he first entered politics at the provincial election defeating Quebec Conservative Party leader and Mayor of Montreal Camillien Houde to win a seat in the Quebec legislature for the Quebec Liberal Party. He lost his seat in 1935 and returned to business. He was first elected to the House of Commons of Canada from the Quebec riding of St. Mary in a 1942 by-election, and was re-elected in the 1945 federal election by again defeating Camillien Houde. He was re-elected in the 1949 election.

In Parliament, Fauteux opposed conscription and was a delegate to the United Nations Relief and Rehabilitation Conference that followed World War II.

Despite his lack of legal training or long tenure in the House, he was tapped by Prime Minister William Lyon Mackenzie King to become Speaker following the 1945 election.

His inexperience in parliamentary procedure caused him difficulties in the Chair. He had a habit of making decisions before MPs had presented their arguments. He preferred the social aspects of the position and entertained and travelled frequently.

He returned to the backbenches after the 1949 election and, in 1950 was appointed Lieutenant-Governor of Quebec by Governor General Harold Alexander, Earl Alexander of Tunis, on the advice of his prime minister, Louis St. Laurent.

After his death in 1963, he was entombed at the Notre Dame des Neiges Cemetery in Montreal.
