= 1931 Quebec general election =

Canadian provincial election

- August 24, 1931

90 seats in the 18th Legislative Assembly of Quebec 46 seats were needed for a majority
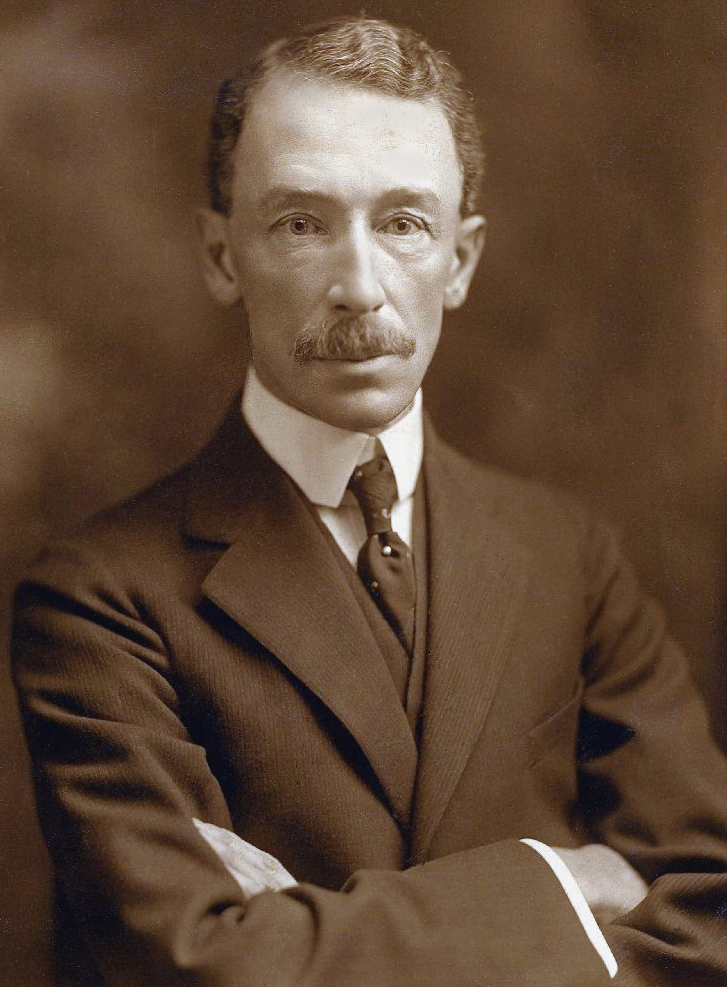

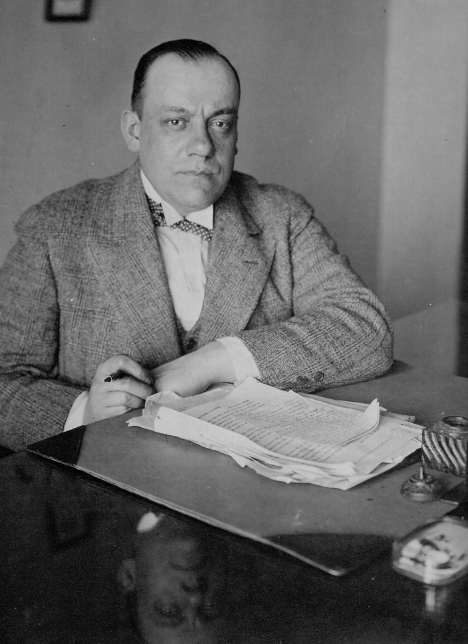
	First party	Second party
Leader	Louis-Alexandre Taschereau	Camillien Houde
Party	Liberal	Conservative
Leader since	1920	1929
Leader's seat	Montmorency	Ran in Montréal–Saint-Jacques (defeated)
Last election	74 seats, 59.33%	9 seats, 34.31%
Seats won	79	11
Seat change	▲5	▲2
Percentage	54.88%	43.54%
Swing	▼4.45pp	▲9.23pp
Premier before election
Louis-Alexandre Taschereau
Liberal
Premier after election
Louis-Alexandre Taschereau
Liberal

The 1931 Quebec general election was held on August 24, 1931, to elect members of the Legislative Assembly of the Province of Quebec, Canada. The incumbent Quebec Liberal Party, led by Louis-Alexandre Taschereau, was re-elected, defeating the Quebec Conservative Party, led by Camillien Houde.

It was the third general election victory in a row for Taschereau, who had held office since 1920.

== Redistribution of ridings ==
An Act passed in 1930 increased the number of MLAs from 85 to 90 through the following changes:

Abolished ridings	New ridings
Divisions of ridings
Gaspé	Gaspé-Nord; Gaspé-Sud
Creation of riding from parts of others
	Gatineau (Note: formed from parts of Hull)
	Laviolette (Note: formed from part of Champlain)
	Rivière-du-Loup (Note: formed from part of Témiscouata)
	Roberval (Note: formed from parts of Lac-Saint-Jean)

== Campaign ==
The Liberals and Conservatives contested all 90 ridings, with 74 being two-way contests, and the remainder were three-way affairs.

Riding contests, by number of candidates (1931)
Candidates	Lib	Ind-G	Con-G	Con	Lab-Opp	Ind-Opp	Ind-Lib	Ind-Con	Ind	Lab	Total
2	74			74							148
3	16	2	1	16	2	1	2	4	2	2	48
Total	90	2	1	16	2	1	2	4	2	2	196

== Aftermath ==
The Conservatives initiated proceedings to attempt to quash up to 63 of the Liberal wins. In one of the hearings, Houde confessed that he had personally furnished $60,000 towards the effort, but did not disclose where he had gotten the funds from. In response, the Taschereau government passed the "Dillon Act", which retroactively amended the laws governing the contesting of controverted elections, thus effectively gutting the ongoing actions. When the Union Nationale subsequently gained power after the 1936 election, one of its first measures was to repeal this Act and restore the law to what it was before its passage.

== Results ==
This was the last election in which a candidate campaigned in multiple ridings. Camillien Houde was nominated in both Montréal–Saint-Jacques and Montréal–Sainte-Marie, and he lost both contests.

Elections to the Legislative Assembly of Quebec (1931)
Political party	Party leader	MLAs				Votes			
Political party	Party leader	Candidates	1927	1931	±	#	±	%	± (pp)
Government candidates									
█ Liberal	Louis-Alexandre Taschereau	90	74	79	5▲	268,732	80,045▲	54.88	4.46▼
█ Independent	–	2	–	–	–	2,787	1,422▲	0.57	0.14▲
█ Conservative	–	1	–	–	–	711	New	0.15	New
Opposition candidates									
█ Conservative	Camillien Houde	90	9	11	2▲	213,223	104,118▲	43.54	9.23▲
█ Labour	–	2	1	–	1▼	1,683	2,749▼	0.34	1.05▼
█ Independent	–	1	–	–	–	106	2,579▼	0.02	0.82▼
Other candidates									
█ Independent-Liberal	–	2	1	–	1▼	1,065	8,280▼	0.22	2.72▼
█ Independent-Conservative	–	4	–	–	–	584	New	0.12	New
█ Labour	–	2	–	–	–	481	1,861▼	0.10	0.64▼
█ Independent	–	2	–	–	–	323	New	0.06	New
Total		196	85	90		489,695		100%	
Rejected ballots						4,190	1,347▲		
Voter turnout						493,885	173,081▲	77.01	14.10▲
Registered electors (contested ridings only)						641,324	131,389▲		
Candidates returned by acclamation				–	12▼				

Popular vote
PLQ	54.88%
PCQ	43.54%
Others	1.58%

Seats summary
PLQ	87.78%
PCQ	12.22%

=== Synopsis of results ===
Results by riding - 1931 Quebec general election
Riding	Winning party						Turnout (Note: including spoilt ballots)	Votes					
Name	1927	Party	Votes	Share	Margin #	Margin %	Turnout	Lib	Con	Gov	Opp	Other	Total
Abitibi	Lib	Lib	2,685	63.42%	1,309	30.92%	76.12%	2,685	1,376	–	–	173	4,234
Argenteuil	Lib	Lib	2,130	55.70%	436	11.40%	80.43%	2,130	1,694	–	–	–	3,824
Arthabaska	Lib	Lib	3,590	68.79%	1,961	37.57%	84.86%	3,590	1,629	–	–	–	5,219
Bagot	Lib	Lib	1,878	52.96%	210	5.92%	89.07%	1,878	1,668	–	–	–	3,546
Beauce	Lib	Lib	3,847	53.77%	1,250	17.47%	82.82%	3,847	2,597	711	–	–	7,155
Beauharnois	Lib	Lib	2,311	51.65%	148	3.31%	82.58%	2,311	2,163	–	–	–	4,474
Bellechasse	Lib	Lib	2,839	67.82%	1,492	35.64%	84.44%	2,839	1,347	–	–	–	4,186
Berthier	Lib	Lib	2,479	57.45%	643	14.90%	87.94%	2,479	1,836	–	–	–	4,315
Bonaventure	Lib	Lib	3,933	58.91%	1,190	17.83%	91.58%	3,933	2,743	–	–	–	6,676
Brome	Lib	Lib	1,472	50.43%	25	0.86%	84.52%	1,472	1,447	–	–	–	2,919
Chambly	Lib	Con	2,834	55.72%	582	11.44%	73.15%	2,252	2,834	–	–	–	5,086
Champlain	Lib	Lib	3,125	53.91%	453	7.81%	87.18%	3,125	2,672	–	–	–	5,797
Charlevoix—Saguenay	Lib	Lib	4,223	59.29%	1,323	18.57%	81.96%	4,223	2,900	–	–	–	7,123
Châteauguay	Lib	Lib	1,661	58.73%	494	17.47%	80.99%	1,661	1,167	–	–	–	2,828
Chicoutimi	Lib	Lib	4,123	43.58%	1,448	15.30%	71.69%	4,123	2,675	2,663	–	–	9,461
Compton	Lib	Lib	2,658	54.84%	469	9.68%	83.63%	2,658	2,189	–	–	–	4,847
Deux-Montagnes	Con	Con	1,645	51.52%	97	3.04%	91.54%	1,548	1,645	–	–	–	3,193
Dorchester	Lib	Lib	3,253	55.67%	663	11.35%	85.53%	3,253	2,590	–	–	–	5,843
Drummond	Lib	Lib	2,848	56.28%	636	12.57%	82.06%	2,848	2,212	–	–	–	5,060
Frontenac	Lib	Lib	2,687	60.57%	938	21.15%	84.94%	2,687	1,749	–	–	–	4,436
Gaspé-Nord	New	Lib	1,330	60.40%	458	20.80%	88.72%	1,330	872	–	–	–	2,202
Gaspé-Sud	New	Lib	2,744	55.80%	570	11.59%	86.33%	2,744	2,174	–	–	–	4,918
Gatineau	New	Lib	2,906	54.87%	759	14.33%	79.80%	2,906	2,147	–	–	243	5,296
Hull	Con	Con	3,491	60.84%	1,244	21.68%	63.95%	2,247	3,491	–	–	–	5,738
Huntingdon	Lib	Con	1,361	53.29%	168	6.58%	81.54%	1,193	1,361	–	–	–	2,554
Iberville	Lib	Lib	1,303	71.16%	775	42.33%	79.02%	1,303	528	–	–	–	1,831
Îles-de-la-Madeleine	Lib	Lib	769	50.26%	8	0.52%	80.88%	769	761	–	–	–	1,530
Jacques-Cartier	Lib	Lib	4,147	51.34%	216	2.67%	77.62%	4,147	3,931	–	–	–	8,078
Joliette	Lib	Lib	3,089	54.70%	531	9.40%	88.46%	3,089	2,558	–	–	–	5,647
Kamouraska	Lib	Lib	2,630	59.44%	835	18.87%	82.21%	2,630	1,795	–	–	–	4,425
L'Assomption	Lib	Lib	1,801	61.20%	783	26.61%	75.15%	1,801	1,018	124	–	–	2,943
L'Islet	Lib	Lib	2,131	60.40%	734	20.80%	78.91%	2,131	1,397	–	–	–	3,528
Labelle	Lib	Lib	1,902	57.92%	520	15.83%	72.28%	1,902	1,382	–	–	–	3,284
Lac-Saint-Jean	Lib	Lib	2,055	52.75%	214	5.49%	80.84%	2,055	1,841	–	–	–	3,896
Laval	Con	Lib	8,696	52.39%	792	4.77%	72.43%	8,696	7,904	–	–	–	16,600
Laviolette	New	Lib	3,010	56.11%	656	12.23%	81.96%	3,010	2,354	–	–	–	5,364
Lévis	Lib	Lib	3,595	53.04%	412	6.08%	86.43%	3,595	3,183	–	–	–	6,778
Lotbinière	Lib	Lib	2,955	67.24%	1,515	34.47%	81.85%	2,955	1,440	–	–	–	4,395
Maisonneuve	Lab	Lib	7,538	49.67%	1,530	10.08%	68.38%	7,538	6,008	–	1,630	–	15,176
Maskinongé	Lib	Lib	1,912	61.24%	702	22.49%	81.47%	1,912	1,210	–	–	–	3,122
Matane	Lib	Lib	2,592	55.86%	544	11.72%	83.98%	2,592	2,048	–	–	–	4,640
Matapédia	Lib	Lib	2,813	62.57%	1,130	25.13%	79.83%	2,813	1,683	–	–	–	4,496
Mégantic	Lib	Lib	4,060	63.09%	1,685	26.18%	79.93%	4,060	2,375	–	–	–	6,435
Missisquoi	Lib	Lib	2,141	54.83%	377	9.65%	78.93%	2,141	1,764	–	–	–	3,905
Montcalm	Lib	Lib	1,765	56.07%	382	12.13%	91.29%	1,765	1,383	–	–	–	3,148
Montmagny	Lib	Lib	2,101	57.45%	545	14.90%	78.94%	2,101	1,556	–	–	–	3,657
Montmorency	Lib	Lib	1,949	58.25%	581	17.36%	89.28%	1,949	1,368	–	–	29	3,346
Montréal-Dorion	Con	Lib	4,831	52.80%	512	5.60%	70.50%	4,831	4,319	–	–	–	9,150
Montréal-Laurier	Lib	Lib	3,565	58.25%	1,426	23.30%	61.85%	3,565	2,139	–	–	416	6,120
Montréal-Mercier	Lib	Lib	9,513	59.45%	3,202	20.01%	69.44%	9,513	6,311	–	–	177	16,001
Montréal–Saint-Georges	Con	Con	1,553	51.37%	83	2.75%	55.27%	1,470	1,553	–	–	–	3,023
Montréal–Saint-Henri	Lib	Lib	3,956	59.91%	1,455	22.04%	74.77%	3,956	2,501	–	–	146	6,603
Montreal–Saint-Jacques (Note: Camillien Houde stood for reelection in Montréal–Sainte-Marie, and also campaigned in Montreal–Saint-Jacques)	Lib	Lib	3,583	56.34%	806	12.67%	73.83%	3,583	2,777	–	–	–	6,360
Montréal–Saint-Laurent	Lib	Lib	2,635	68.98%	1,450	37.96%	83.41%	2,635	1,185	–	–	–	3,820
Montréal–Saint-Louis	Lib	Lib	2,789	78.21%	2,077	58.24%	62.08%	2,789	712	–	–	65	3,566
Montreal–Sainte-Anne	Lib	Lib	2,069	54.38%	683	17.95%	70.89%	2,069	1,386	–	–	350	3,805
Montréal–Sainte-Marie	Lib	Lib	4,989	52.43%	515	5.41%	74.10%	4,989	4,474	–	53	–	9,516
Montréal-Verdun	Con	Con	7,074	51.12%	1,132	8.18%	64.60%	5,942	7,074	–	–	822	13,838
Napierville-Laprairie	Lib	Lib	2,337	58.67%	691	17.35%	86.81%	2,337	1,646	–	–	–	3,983
Nicolet	Lib	Lib	3,316	57.91%	1,012	17.67%	80.86%	3,316	2,304	–	106	–	5,726
Papineau	Lib	Lib	3,554	56.43%	810	12.86%	79.55%	3,554	2,744	–	–	–	6,298
Pontiac	Lib	Lib	2,164	52.44%	201	4.87%	75.40%	2,164	1,963	–	–	–	4,127
Portneuf	Lib	Lib	3,746	52.14%	308	4.29%	84.80%	3,746	3,438	–	–	–	7,184
Québec-Centre	Lib	Lib	3,522	54.95%	635	9.91%	76.59%	3,522	2,887	–	–	–	6,409
Québec-Comté	Lib	Lib	3,747	54.66%	639	9.32%	92.20%	3,747	3,108	–	–	–	6,855
Québec-Est	Lib	Lib	5,021	57.67%	1,336	15.35%	81.55%	5,021	3,685	–	–	–	8,706
Québec-Ouest	Lib	Lib	1,641	52.82%	175	5.63%	80.82%	1,641	1,466	–	–	–	3,107
Richelieu	Lib	Lib	2,685	55.13%	532	10.92%	87.51%	2,685	2,153	–	–	32	4,870
Richmond	Lib	Lib	2,915	59.81%	956	19.61%	79.93%	2,915	1,959	–	–	–	4,874
Rimouski	Lib	Lib	2,455	52.25%	211	4.49%	87.80%	2,455	2,244	–	–	–	4,699
Rivière-du-Loup	New	Lib	3,777	64.29%	1,679	28.58%	81.64%	3,777	2,098	–	–	–	5,875
Roberval	New	Lib	2,732	52.89%	299	5.79%	88.00%	2,732	2,433	–	–	–	5,165
Rouville	Lib	Con	1,562	50.23%	14	0.45%	88.06%	1,548	1,562	–	–	–	3,110
Saint-Hyacinthe	Lib	Lib	3,115	58.78%	931	17.57%	86.85%	3,115	2,184	–	–	–	5,299
Saint-Jean	Lib	Lib	2,387	74.02%	1,549	48.03%	74.72%	2,387	838	–	–	–	3,225
Saint-Maurice	Lib	Lib	3,571	57.36%	916	14.71%	82.38%	3,571	2,655	–	–	–	6,226
Saint-Sauveur	Lib	Con	3,911	50.16%	25	0.32%	85.89%	3,886	3,911	–	–	–	7,797
Shefford	Lib	Lib	2,989	52.94%	332	5.88%	83.21%	2,989	2,657	–	–	–	5,646
Sherbrooke	Con	Lib	4,114	52.51%	394	5.03%	76.69%	4,114	3,720	–	–	–	7,834
Soulanges	Lib	Lib	1,120	58.89%	338	17.77%	82.09%	1,120	782	–	–	–	1,902
Stanstead	Lib	Lib	2,907	58.59%	852	17.17%	80.69%	2,907	2,055	–	–	–	4,962
Témiscamingue	Lib	Lib	2,062	60.13%	695	20.27%	77.71%	2,062	1,367	–	–	–	3,429
Témiscouata	Lib	Lib	1,671	52.45%	156	4.90%	87.57%	1,671	1,515	–	–	–	3,186
Terrebonne	Lib	Lib	4,749	65.97%	2,299	31.93%	81.15%	4,749	2,450	–	–	–	7,199
Trois-Rivières	Con	Con	3,812	50.27%	41	0.54%	82.96%	3,771	3,812	–	–	–	7,583
Vaudreuil	Lib	Lib	1,385	55.22%	262	10.45%	83.83%	1,385	1,123	–	–	–	2,508
Verchères	Lib	Lib	1,623	60.04%	543	20.09%	88.51%	1,623	1,080	–	–	–	2,703
Westmount	Con	Con	8,944	67.52%	4,642	35.04%	45.04%	4,302	8,944	–	–	–	13,246
Wolfe	Lib	Lib	1,907	57.06%	472	14.12%	85.04%	1,907	1,435	–	–	–	3,342
Yamaska	Lib	Con	1,909	52.10%	154	4.20%	88.35%	1,755	1,909	–	–	–	3,664

= open seat
= turnout is above provincial average
= winning candidate was in previous Legislature
= incumbent had switched allegiance
= not incumbent; was previously elected to the Legislature
= incumbency arose from byelection gain
= previously incumbent in another riding
= other incumbents renominated
= multiple candidates

=== Analysis ===
None of the third parties achieved a 1st- or 2nd-place result.

Resulting composition of the 18th Quebec Legislative Assembly
Source		Party		
Source		Lib	Con	Total
Seats retained	Incumbents returned	56	6	62
Seats retained	Open seats held	12		12
Seats retained	Byelection loss reversed	1		1
Seats changing hands	Incumbents defeated	4	2	6
Seats changing hands	Open seats gained		2	2
Seats changing hands	Byelection gain held		1	1
New ridings	Incumbent returned in new seat	2		2
New ridings	New MLAs elected	4		4
Total		79	11	90

== See also ==
- List of Quebec premiers
- Politics of Quebec
- Timeline of Quebec history
- List of Quebec political parties
- 18th Legislative Assembly of Quebec
