= Camillien Houde =

Canadian politician (1889–1958)

His Worship Camillien Houde CBE OStJ
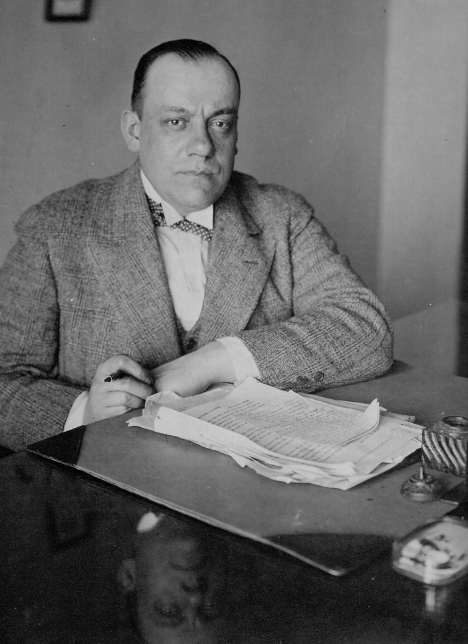
- Camillien Houde in 1930

34th Mayor of Montreal
- In office 1928–1932
- Preceded by: Médéric Martin
- Succeeded by: Fernand Rinfret
- In office 1934–1936
- Preceded by: Fernand Rinfret
- Succeeded by: Adhémar Raynault
- In office 1938–1940
- Preceded by: Adhémar Raynault
- Succeeded by: Adhémar Raynault
- In office 1944–1954
- Preceded by: Adhémar Raynault
- Succeeded by: Jean Drapeau

Leader of the Conservative Party of Quebec
- In office 1929–1932
- Preceded by: Arthur Sauvé
- Succeeded by: Charles Ernest Gault

MLA for Montréal–Sainte-Marie
- In office 1923–1927
- Preceded by: Joseph Gauthier
- Succeeded by: Joseph Gauthier
- In office 1928–1931
- Preceded by: Joseph Gauthier
- Succeeded by: Gaspard Fauteux
- In office 1939–1944
- Preceded by: Candide Rochefort
- Succeeded by: Camille Côté

Member of Parliament for Papineau
- In office 1949–1953
- Preceded by: Riding created
- Succeeded by: Adrien Meunier

Personal details
- Born: August 13, 1889 Montreal, Quebec, Canada
- Died: September 11, 1958 (aged 69) Montreal, Quebec, Canada
- Resting place: Notre Dame des Neiges Cemetery
- Party: Conservative Party of Quebec; Conservative Party of Canada; Independent

Camillien Houde CBE OStJ (French pronunciation: [kamiljɛ̃ ud]; August 13, 1889 – September 11, 1958) was a Quebec politician, a Member of Parliament, and a four-time mayor of Montreal. He is of the few Canadian politicians to have served at all three levels of government. During World War II, Houde was interned under the War Measures Act for campaigning against conscription.

== Political career ==
Houde was born in Montreal on August 13, 1889 and died there on September 11, 1958. He was nicknamed "l'imprévisible"—the unpredictable. He was the only surviving child of Azade Houde and Josephine Frenette. He is descended from the first Houde ancestor, Louis Houde, who came from Manou, Eure-et-Loir, France to New France in 1647. Louis Houde's son was Louis H. who married Marie Lemay in 1685.

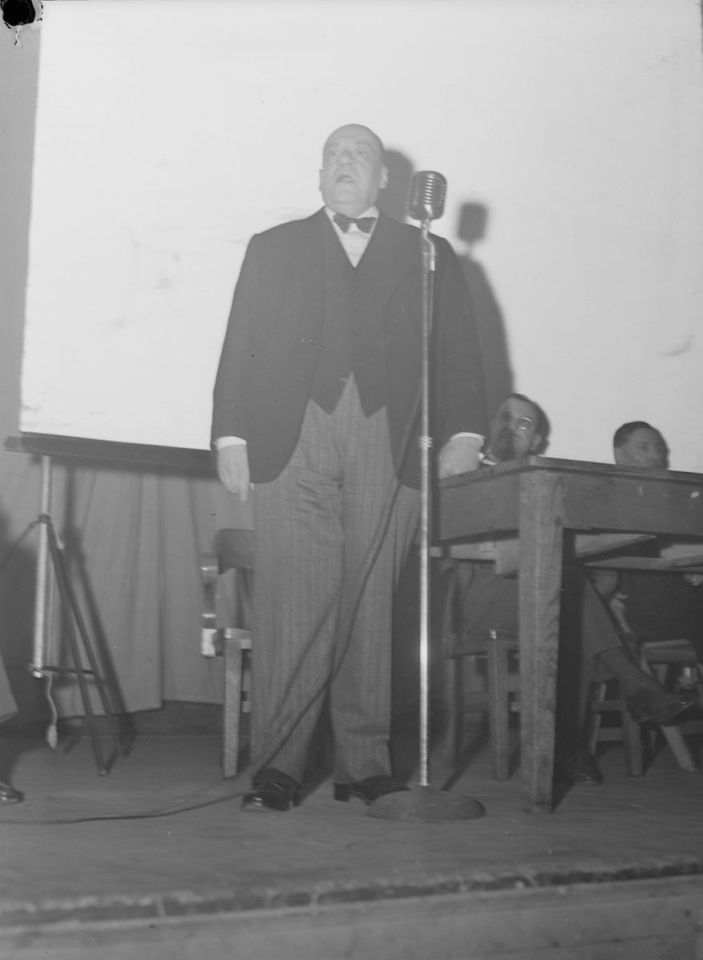
As Montreal Mayor in 1945 at a Chamber of Commerce event.

He was first elected to the Legislative Assembly of Quebec as a member of the Conservative Party for the riding of Montréal–Sainte-Marie in the 1923 election. He was defeated in the 1927 election, but re-elected in a by-election on October 24, 1928. He was elected leader of the Conservative Party on July 10, 1929, led the party to defeat in the 1931 election, and failed to win a seat in Montréal–Saint-Jacques after vacating his previous seat. He resigned as Conservative leader on September 19, 1932.

In 1930, Jews in Montreal expressed anger over antisemitic statements made by Houde. During a speech, an audience member had yelled, "To hell with the Jews!" Houde replied, "Well said. They have a new country and if they won't meet your demands they can go to Palestine, their country."

When George VI and Queen Elizabeth visited Montreal on the 1939 royal tour of Canada and were greeted by cheering crowds, Houde turned to the King and said: "You know, Your Majesty, some of this is for you."

He moved to federal politics and lost in a bid for election as a Conservative candidate for the House of Commons of Canada in a 1938 by-election in the Montreal riding of St. Mary. In 1940, he was arrested and charged under the Defence of Canada Regulations. He was imprisoned at Camp Petawawa in Ontario until the end of the war. He ran again in St. Mary, this time as an independent candidate, in the 1945 federal election, but was again defeated. He won a seat as an independent candidate in the riding of Papineau in the 1949 federal election by less than 100 votes. He did not run for re-election in the 1953 election.

Houde became a figure of ridicule in parts of English Canada because of his conduct in opposition to conscription. During the 1949 federal election, the Toronto Star, which openly supported the Liberal Party, attempted to link the unpopular Houde with George Drew, then leader of the Progressive Conservative Party of Canada even though Houde was running as an independent candidate against an official Progressive Conservative candidate. The Star accused Drew of making a secret pact with Quebec Premier Maurice Duplessis to appoint Houde to the Cabinet as Drew's Quebec lieutenant should the Tories win the election. The newspaper's campaign reached its culmination the Saturday before the election with a banner front-page headline reading:

KEEP CANADA BRITISH

DESTROY DREW'S HOUDE

GOD SAVE THE KING

(in later editions, the last line was changed to "VOTE ST. LAURENT").

Concurrent to his career in provincial and federal politics, Houde was mayor of Montreal from 1928 to 1932, from 1934 to 1936, from 1938 to 1940, and from 1944 to 1954.

== World War II controversy ==
In 1939, Houde said that "French-Canadians are Fascists by blood", and stating that if there was a war between Britain and Fascist Italy, he would prefer to side with Italy.

During World War II, Houde campaigned against conscription. On August 2, 1940, Houde publicly urged the men of Quebec to ignore the national registration measure introduced by the federal government. Three days later, he was placed under arrest by the Royal Canadian Mounted Police on charges of sedition, and then confined without trial in internment camps in Petawawa, Ontario and Ripples, New Brunswick for four years. Upon his release on August 18, 1944, he was greeted by a cheering crowd of 50,000 Montrealers, and won back his job as Montreal mayor in 1944's civic election.

After the war, Houde signed a petition protesting Nazi collaborator Jacques de Bernonville's extradition to France.

== Honours ==
Houde was made Chevalier of the Légion d'honneur and Commander of the Order of the British Empire in 1935 and an Officer of the Order of St John in 1953.

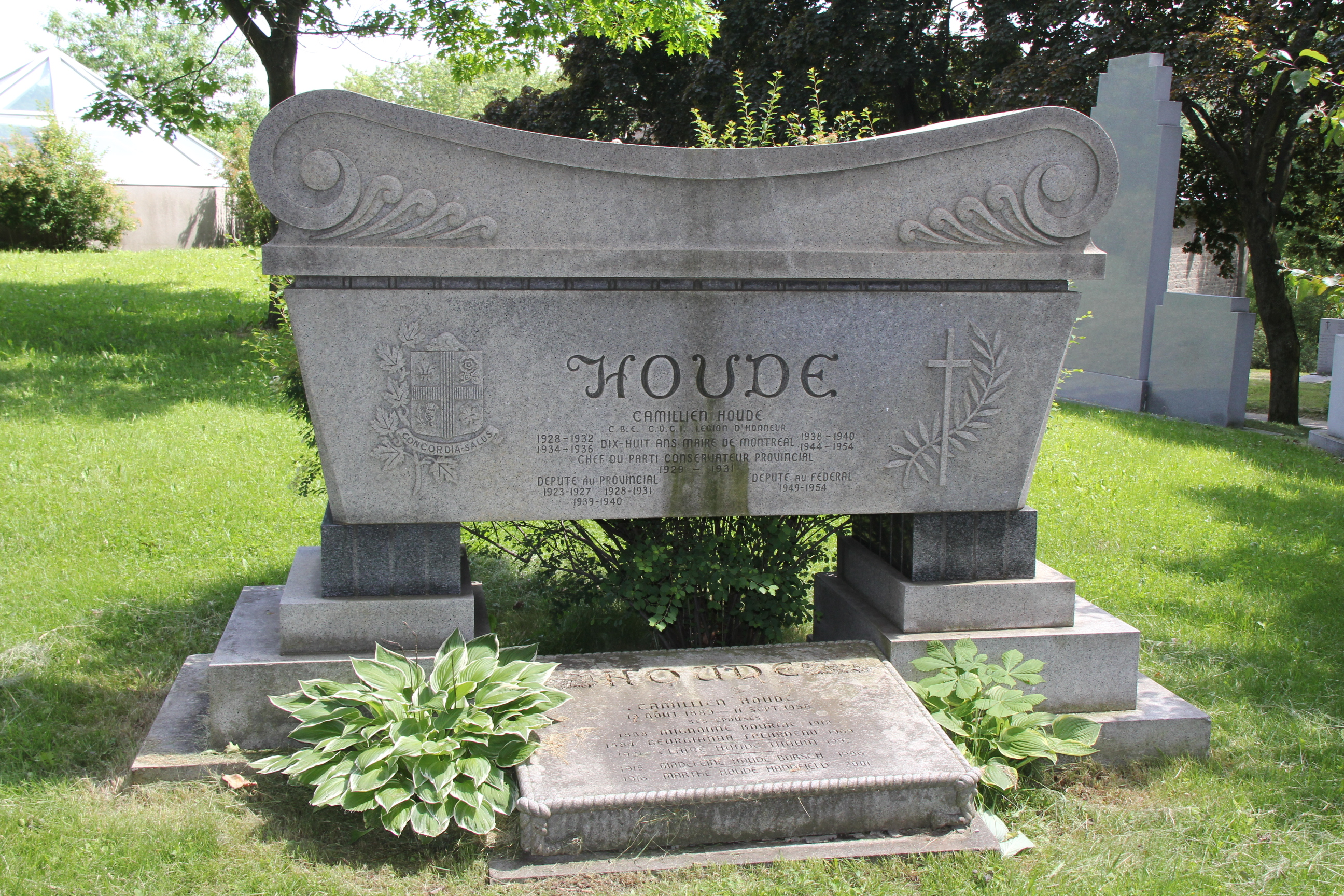
Headstone at Cimetière Notre-Dame-des-Neiges

== Legacy ==
On his death in 1958, Camillien Houde was interred in the Cimetière Notre-Dame-des-Neiges in Montreal, Quebec in an Italian marble replica of Napoleon's tomb.

Mayor Houde was a reform-minded mayor in the areas of patronage, unemployment, and organized crime. He was also responsible for some of the major public park improvements in Montreal including the park on Mont Royal with its man-made lake and park facilities. "Camilliennes" were public washrooms built by Houde during the Great Depression.

After his death, Mayor Jean Drapeau named a new road over Mount Royal after Houde, an act many considered ironic, as Houde and many others had long opposed building roads over the city's famous mountain.

== Other information ==
Mayor Houde threw a party for the then-new fellowship of Alcoholics Anonymous, which was described by Bill W in the book Alcoholics Anonymous Comes of Age as "probably the first official reception that any A.A. group ever had."

== See also ==
- Politics of Quebec
- List of Quebec general elections
- List of Quebec leaders of the Opposition
- Timeline of Quebec history
- Conscription Crisis of 1944

National Assembly of Quebec
Preceded by Joseph Gauthier	MLA for Montréal–Sainte-Marie; 1923–1927	Succeeded by Joseph Gauthier
Preceded by Joseph Gauthier	MLA for Montréal–Sainte-Marie; 1928–1931	Succeeded by Gaspard Fauteux
Preceded by Candide Rochefort	MLA for Montréal–Sainte-Marie; 1939–1944	Succeeded by Camille Côté
Parliament of Canada
New constituency	Member of Parliament for Papineau; 1949–1953	Succeeded by Adrien Meunier
Party political offices
Preceded by Charles Ernest Gault	Leader of the Quebec Conservative Party; 1929–1932	Succeeded by Maurice Duplessis
Political offices
Preceded by Arthur Sauvé	Leader of the Opposition in Quebec; 1929–1931	Succeeded by Charles Ernest Gault
Preceded by Médéric Martin	Mayor of Montreal; 1928–1932	Succeeded by Fernand Rinfret
Preceded by Fernand Rinfret	Mayor of Montreal; 1934–1936	Succeeded by Adhémar Raynault
Preceded by Adhémar Raynault	Mayor of Montreal; 1938–1940	Succeeded by Adhémar Raynault
Preceded by Adhémar Raynault	Mayor of Montreal; 1944–1954	Succeeded by Jean Drapeau
