= Vivian Barbot =

Canadian politician (born 1941)

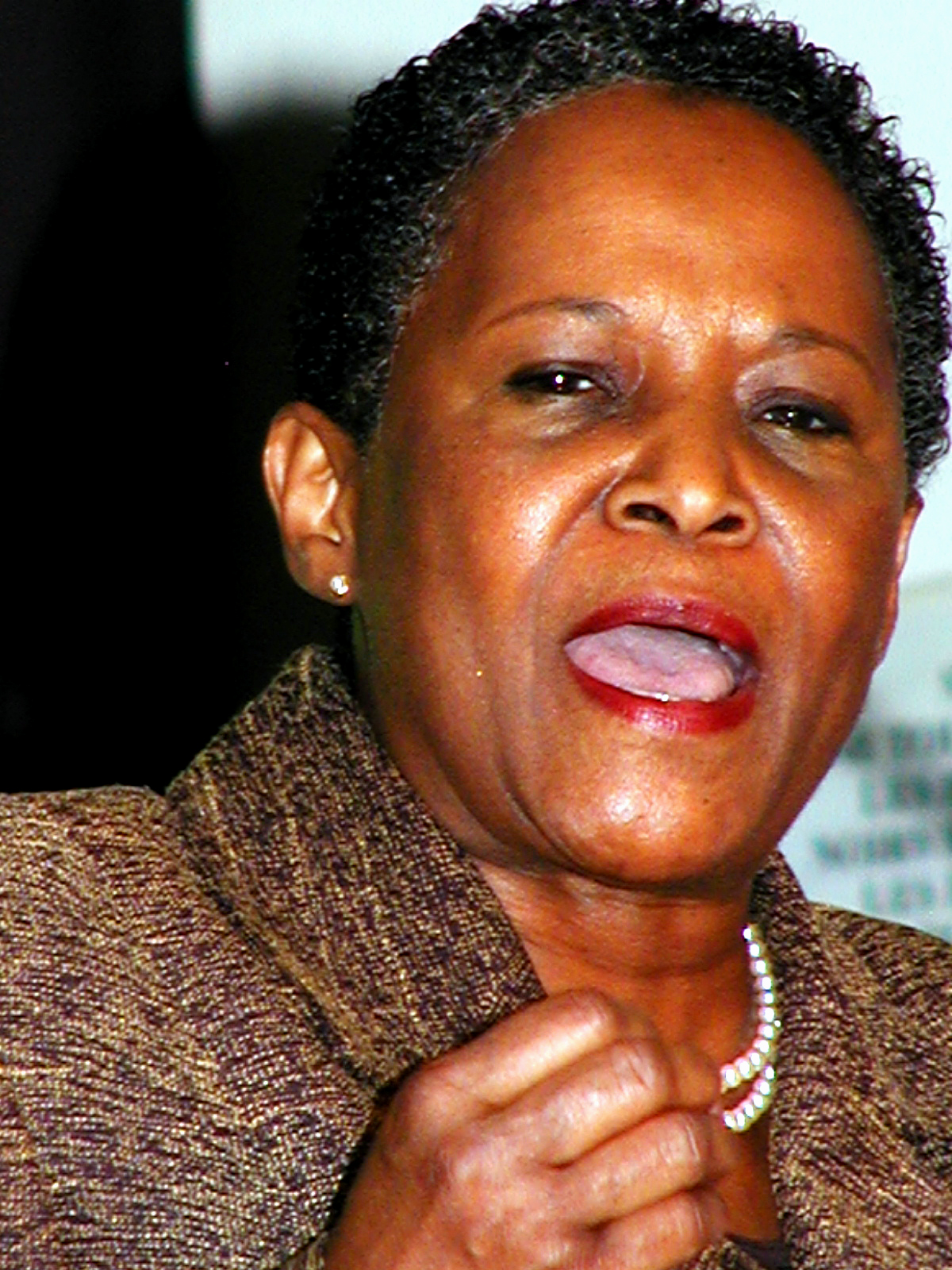
- Barbot in 2007

Member of Parliament for Papineau
- In office February 6, 2006 – October 14, 2008
- Preceded by: Pierre Pettigrew
- Succeeded by: Justin Trudeau

Interim Leader of the Bloc Québécois
- In office May 3, 2011 – December 11, 2011
- Preceded by: Gilles Duceppe
- Succeeded by: Daniel Paillé

Vice-President of Bloc Québécois
- In office May 15, 2009 – January 24, 2012
- Succeeded by: Annie Lessard

Personal details
- Born: July 7, 1941 (age 85) Saint-Marc, Haiti
- Party: Bloc Québécois
- Parent: Clément Barbot (father)
- Profession: President/manager, teacher

Vivian Barbot (born July 7, 1941) is a Canadian politician who was the member of Parliament (MP) for Papineau from 2006 to 2008. A member of the Bloc Québécois, Barbot served as interim leader in 2011 and was the party's vice-president from 2009 to 2012.

== Personal life ==
Barbot was born in Saint-Marc, Haiti, where her father, Clément Barbot, briefly worked as a teacher before becoming head of the secret police and her mother was a political aide under the dictator François Duvalier.

== Political career ==
Barbot is a former president of the Fédération des femmes du Québec, a former member of Parliament and former vice-president of the Bloc Québécois. She was the party's interim leader and president following the resignation of Gilles Duceppe in May 2011. Barbot became the first person of a visible minority group to lead a Canadian federal political party with parliamentary representation.

In the 2006 election, she scored a significant victory for the Bloc by defeating former Liberal minister Pierre Pettigrew, but was defeated two years later in the 2008 federal election by Justin Trudeau. Barbot ran against Trudeau in the 2011 election, but was once again defeated.

The 2011 election also saw the defeat of party leader Gilles Duceppe and all but four Bloc MPs. As vice-president of the party, Barbot was appointed interim party leader and president following Duceppe's resignation and remained in the position until Duceppe's successor, Daniel Paillé, was elected on December 11, 2011.

== Election results ==
2011 Canadian federal election
Party	Candidate	Votes	%	±%	Expenditures
Liberal	Justin Trudeau	16,429	38.41	-3.06	
New Democratic	Marcos Radhamés Tejada	12,102	28.29	+19.55	
Bloc Québécois	Vivian Barbot	11,091	25.93	-12.76	
Conservative	Shama Chopra	2,021	4.73	-2.90	
Green	Danny Polifroni	806	1.88	-0.96	
Marxist–Leninist	Peter Macrisopoulos	228	0.53	–	
Independent	Joseph Young	95	0.22	–	
Total valid votes/expense limit		42,772	100.00		
Total rejected ballots		558	1.29	-0.04	
Turnout		43,330	61.46		
Eligible voters		70,500	–	–	

2008 Canadian federal election
Party	Candidate	Votes	%	±%	Expenditures
Liberal	Justin Trudeau	17,724	41.47	+2.99	$76,857
Bloc Québécois	Vivian Barbot	16,535	38.69	-2.06	$70,872
New Democratic	Costa Zafiropoulos	3,734	8.74	+1.04	$5,745
Conservative	Mustaque Sarker	3,262	7.63	-0.69	$44,958
Green	Ingrid Hein	1,213	2.84	-0.76	$814
Independent	Mahmood Raza Baig	267	0.62	+0.20	
Total valid votes/expense limit		42,735	100.00	$81,172	
Total rejected ballots		576	1.33		
Turnout		43,311			

Note: Baig's share of popular vote as an independent candidate is compared to his share in the 2006 general election as a Canadian Action Party candidate.

2006 Canadian federal election
Party	Candidate	Votes	%	±%	Expenditures
Bloc Québécois	Vivian Barbot	17,775	40.75	+0.79	$50,886
Liberal	Pierre Pettigrew	16,785	38.48	-2.62	$75,541
Conservative	Mustaque Sarker	3,630	8.32	+3.55	$34,951
New Democratic	Marc Hasbani	3,358	7.70	-1.07	$2,568
Green	Louis-Philippe Verenka	1,572	3.60	+1.03	$181
Marxist–Leninist	Peter Macrisopoulos	317	0.73	+0.32	
Canadian Action	Mahmood-Raza Baig	185	0.42	–	$2,007
Total valid votes/expense limit		43,622	100.00	$76,023	
