= Candide Rochefort =

Canadian politician

Member of the Legislative Assembly of Quebec for Montréal–Sainte-Marie
- In office 1935–1939
- Preceded by: Gaspard Fauteux
- Succeeded by: Camillien Houde

Personal details
- Born: February 8, 1904 Salaberry-de-Valleyfield, Quebec
- Died: June 24, 1971 (aged 67) Montreal, Quebec
- Resting place: Notre Dame des Neiges Cemetery
- Party: Action libérale nationale Union Nationale

Candide Rochefort (February 8, 1904 – June 24, 1971) was a politician Quebec, Canada and a Member of the Legislative Assembly of Quebec (MLA).

== Early life ==
He was born on February 8, 1904, in Salaberry-de-Valleyfield, Quebec and became a brick mason.

== City politics ==
Rochefort ran for Mayor of Montreal in 1936 and 1938 and each time finished a distant third.

== Member of the legislature ==
He ran as an Action libérale nationale candidate in the district of Montréal–Sainte-Marie in the 1935 provincial election and won against Liberal incumbent Gaspard Fauteux. Rochefort joined Maurice Duplessis's Union Nationale and was re-elected in the 1936 election. He was defeated by Mayor of Montreal Camillien Houde in the 1939 election.

== Death ==
He died on June 24, 1971, in Montreal.
