= Camille Côté =

Canadian politician

Member of the Legislative Assembly of Quebec for Montréal–Sainte-Marie
- In office 1944–1948
- Preceded by: Camillien Houde
- Succeeded by: Aime Gendron

Personal details
- Born: January 12, 1905 Montreal, Quebec
- Died: December 8, 1967 (aged 62) Montreal, Quebec
- Party: Union Nationale

Camille Côté (January 12, 1905 – December 8, 1967) was a Canadian politician.

Born in Montreal, Quebec, Côté was a member of the Montreal City Council from 1940 to 1947. Côté was elected as the Union Nationale candidate to the Legislative Assembly of Quebec for Montréal–Sainte-Marie in 1944. He did not run in 1948.

He died in Montreal in 1967.
