= Joseph Gauthier (Quebec MLA) =

Canadian politician

Member of the Legislative Assembly of Quebec for Montréal–Sainte-Marie
- In office 1921–1923
- Preceded by: Napoléon Séguin
- Succeeded by: Camillien Houde
- In office May 16, 1927 – December 2, 1927
- Preceded by: Camillien Houde
- Succeeded by: Camillien Houde

Personal details
- Born: March 11, 1877 Montreal, Quebec
- Died: June 27, 1934 (aged 57) Montreal, Quebec
- Party: Liberal

Joseph Gauthier (French pronunciation: [ʒozɛf ɡotje]; March 11, 1877 – June 27, 1934) was a politician Quebec, Canada and a Member of the Legislative Assembly of Quebec (MLA).

== Early life ==
He was born on March 11, 1877, in Montreal, the son of Édouard Gauthier and Célina Richard. He became a typographer and a union activist. Gauthier worked at L'Étendard and then La Patrie. In 1899, he married Mélina Bourgeois.

== Political career ==
He ran as a Labour candidate in the district of Montréal–Sainte-Marie in a by-election held on December 22, 1921, and won. Gauthier was defeated by Conservative candidate Camillien Houde in the 1923 provincial election.

Gauthier defeated Houde and was re-elected as a Liberal in 1927 provincial election. His election was declared void in 1927. Gauthier was not a candidate in the subsequent by-election.

== Death ==
He died on June 27, 1934, in Montreal and was buried in the Notre Dame des Neiges Cemetery.
