= François Martineau =

Canadian politician

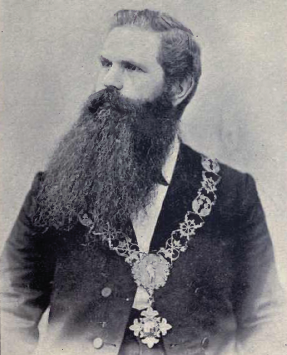

Member of the Legislative Assembly of Quebec for Montréal division no. 1
- In office 1892–1897
- Preceded by: Joseph Béland
- Succeeded by: Georges-Albini Lacombe

Personal details
- Born: 27 August 1844 Saint-Jérôme, Canada East
- Died: 22 May 1911 (aged 66) Montreal, Quebec
- Party: Conservative

François Martineau (French pronunciation: [fʁɑ̃swa maʁtino]; 27 August 1844 – 22 May 1911) was a Canadian politician.

Born in Saint-Jérôme, Canada East, the son of Joseph Martineau, a farmer, and Marie Anne David, he moved with his family to Montreal in 1852. He received his education at the Christian Brothers' School. In 1856, he was apprenticed to the trade of house painting, which he followed, together with that of contractor, until 1872. In 1870, he opened a retail hardware store. In 1886, he was elected alderman to the Montreal City Council for St. Mary's Ward, and was re-elected by acclamation in 1889. He was acting mayor, and member of the Finance, Water and City Hall committees.

He was elected to the Legislative Assembly of Quebec in the 1892 election for the riding of Montréal division no. 1. A Conservative, he was defeated in the 1897 election.
