= Clément Barbot =

Haitian political aide (1914–1963)

- Born: 1914; Gonaïves, Haiti
- Died: 14 July 1963 (aged 48–49); Port-au-Prince

Clément Barbot (1914 – 14 July 1963) was a top aide to Haitian President François Duvalier. Following the July 1958 coup attempt, Barbot became the first leader of the Tonton Macoute, a 'National Security Volunteer Militia' that brutally enforced Duvalier's despotic rule. After suffering a heart attack in May 1959, Duvalier named Barbot as his proxy; once he recovered he accused Barbot of trying to depose him as President, and had him imprisoned at the notorious Fort Dimanche. After he was released in 1963, Barbot, his brother Harry, and a small group of supporters attempted to overthrow Duvalier by kidnapping his children in Port-au-Prince. The effort quickly collapsed, and over the next few days Barbot and his men were chased down and killed. Vivian Barbot is his daughter.
