= Napoléon Séguin =

Canadian politician

Member of the Legislative Assembly of Quebec for Montréal division no. 1
- In office 1908–1912
- Preceded by: Georges-Albini Lacombe
- Succeeded by: District was abolished in 1912

Member of the Legislative Assembly of Quebec for Montréal–Sainte-Marie
- In office 1912–1921
- Preceded by: District was abolished in 1912
- Succeeded by: Joseph Gauthier

Personal details
- Born: December 13, 1865 Sainte Madeleine de Rigaud, Canada East
- Died: January 29, 1940 (aged 74) Montréal-Nord, Quebec
- Party: Liberal

Napoléon Séguin (December 13, 1865 – January 29, 1940) was a Canadian politician.

Born in Sainte Madeleine de Rigaud, Canada East, Séguin was acclaimed to the Legislative Assembly of Quebec for Montréal division no. 1 in 1908. A Liberal, he was re-elected in Montréal–Sainte-Marie in 1912, 1916, and 1919. He was a Minister without Portfolio in the cabinet of Lomer Gouin in 1919 and in the cabinet of Louis-Alexandre Taschereau in 1920.

He resigned in 1921 when he was appointed Governor of the Bordeaux Prison, a post he held until 1939.

He died in Montréal-Nord in 1940.
