= Joseph Béland =

Canadian politician

Member of the Legislative Assembly of Quebec for Montréal division no. 1
- In office 1890–1892
- Preceded by: District created in 1890
- Succeeded by: François Martineau

Personal details
- Born: November 24, 1843 Montreal, Canada East
- Died: February 14, 1929 (aged 85) Montreal, Quebec
- Party: Labour Party

Joseph Béland (November 24, 1843 – February 14, 1929) was a politician in Quebec, Canada and a Member of the Legislative Assembly of Quebec (MLA).

== Early life ==
He was born on November 24, 1843, in Montreal. He became a mason and a union activist.

== Political career ==
Béland ran as a Labour candidate in the provincial district of Montréal no. 1 in the 1890 election and won. He was defeated by Conservative candidate François Martineau in the 1892 election.

== Death ==
He died in Montreal on February 14, 1929, and is buried at Notre-Dame-des-Neiges cemetery.
