= Pierre Pettigrew =

Canadian politician and businessman

The Honourable Pierre Pettigrew PC
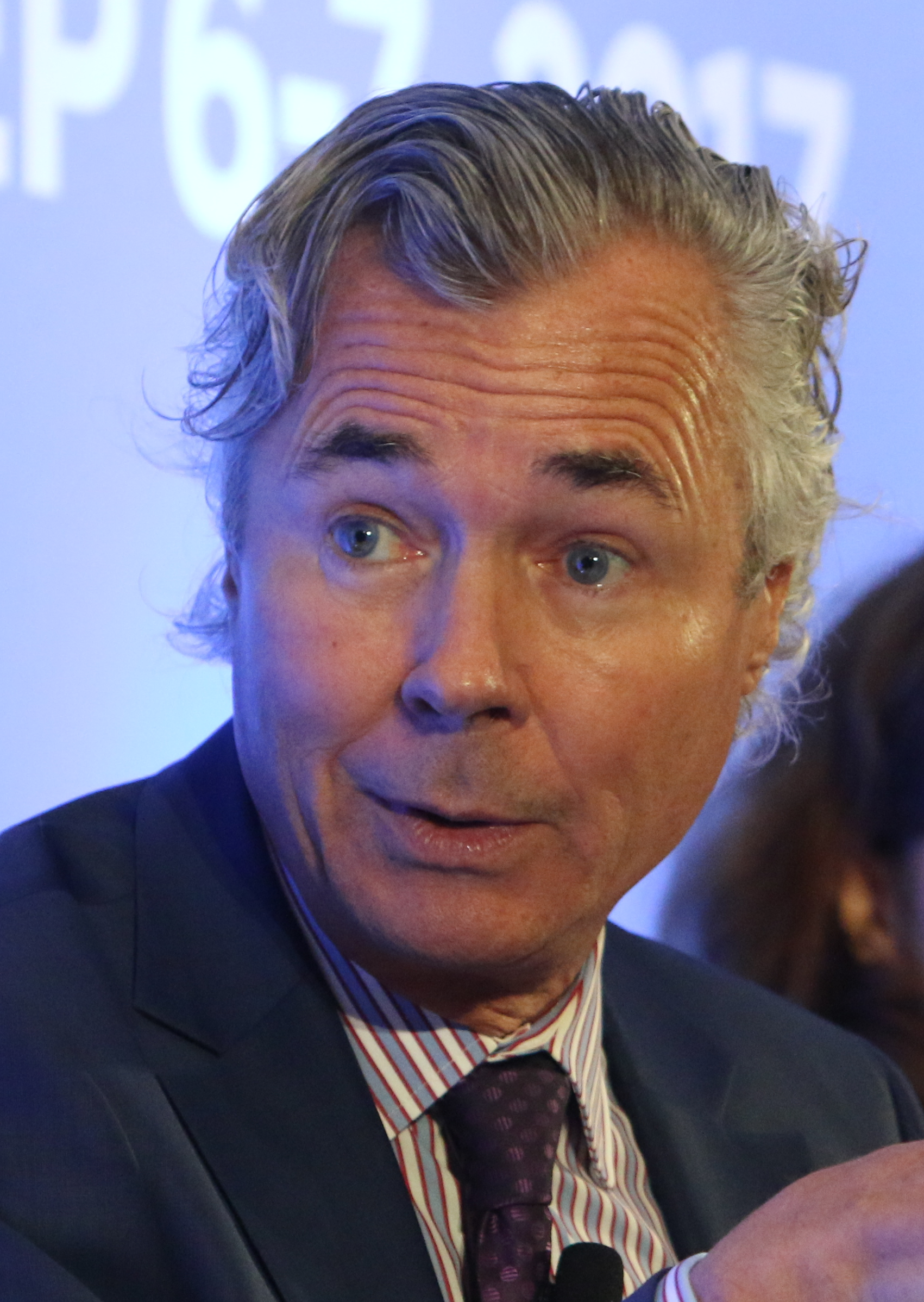
- Pettigrew in 2017

Minister of Foreign Affairs
- In office July 20, 2004 – February 5, 2006
- Prime Minister: Paul Martin
- Preceded by: Bill Graham
- Succeeded by: Peter MacKay

Minister of Health
- In office December 12, 2003 – July 19, 2004
- Prime Minister: Paul Martin
- Preceded by: Anne McLellan
- Succeeded by: Ujjal Dosanjh

Minister of Intergovernmental Affairs
- In office December 12, 2003 – July 19, 2004
- Prime Minister: Paul Martin
- Preceded by: Stéphane Dion
- Succeeded by: Lucienne Robillard

Minister for International Trade
- In office August 3, 1999 – December 11, 2003
- Prime Minister: Jean Chrétien
- Preceded by: Sergio Marchi
- Succeeded by: Jim Peterson

Minister of Human Resources Development
- In office October 4, 1996 – August 2, 1999
- Prime Minister: Jean Chrétien
- Preceded by: Doug Young
- Succeeded by: Jane Stewart

Minister for International Cooperation
- In office January 25, 1996 – October 3, 1996
- Prime Minister: Jean Chrétien
- Preceded by: Position created
- Succeeded by: Don Boudria

Member of Parliament for Papineau Papineau—Saint-Michel (1996–1997) Papineau—Saint-Denis (1997–2004)
- In office March 25, 1996 – January 22, 2006
- Preceded by: André Ouellet
- Succeeded by: Vivian Barbot

Personal details
- Born: Pierre Stewart Pettigrew; April 18, 1951 (age 75) Quebec City, Quebec, Canada
- Party: Liberal
- Education: Université du Québec à Trois-Rivières; Balliol College, Oxford
- Profession: Businessman

Pierre Stewart Pettigrew PC (born April 18, 1951) is a Canadian politician and businessman.

== Early life and career ==
Born in Quebec City, Pettigrew has a Bachelor of Arts degree in philosophy from the Université du Québec à Trois-Rivières (1972) and a Master of Philosophy degree in international relations from the University of Oxford (1976) where he studied at Balliol College.

Prior to seeking elected office, Pettigrew was director of the Political Committee, NATO Assembly, in Brussels, from 1976 to 1978, executive assistant to the Leader of the Quebec Liberal Party from 1978 to 1981 and Foreign Policy Advisor to Pierre Trudeau, Prime Minister of Canada, from 1981 to 1984. Pettigrew was vice-president of Samson Bélair/Deloitte & Touche in Montreal from 1985 to 1995, where he acted as a business consultant to companies with dealings in international markets.

== Political career ==
Pettigrew served in the Liberal cabinet of Jean Chrétien in various capacities and in the government of Paul Martin as Canada's Minister of Foreign Affairs. In the 2006 federal election he was defeated as the Member of Parliament for the Montreal-area electoral district of Papineau.

Following the 1995 Quebec referendum Prime Minister Jean Chrétien was committed to bringing in more star candidates from Quebec to his cabinet. He thus appointed Pettigrew and Stéphane Dion to cabinet, even before they were in the house. Pettigrew previously ran for parliament in the 1984 federal election in the riding of Kamouraska—Rivière-du-Loup but was defeated by less than 7,000 votes by the Progressive Conservative candidate, André Plourde.

André Ouellet was made head of Canada Post, opening the riding of Papineau—Saint-Michel. Pettigrew was elected to Parliament in a March 25, 1996 by-election. He was re-elected in 1997 and 2000, representing the new riding of Papineau—Saint-Denis. In 1996 he became Minister for International Cooperation and Minister responsible for La Francophonie.

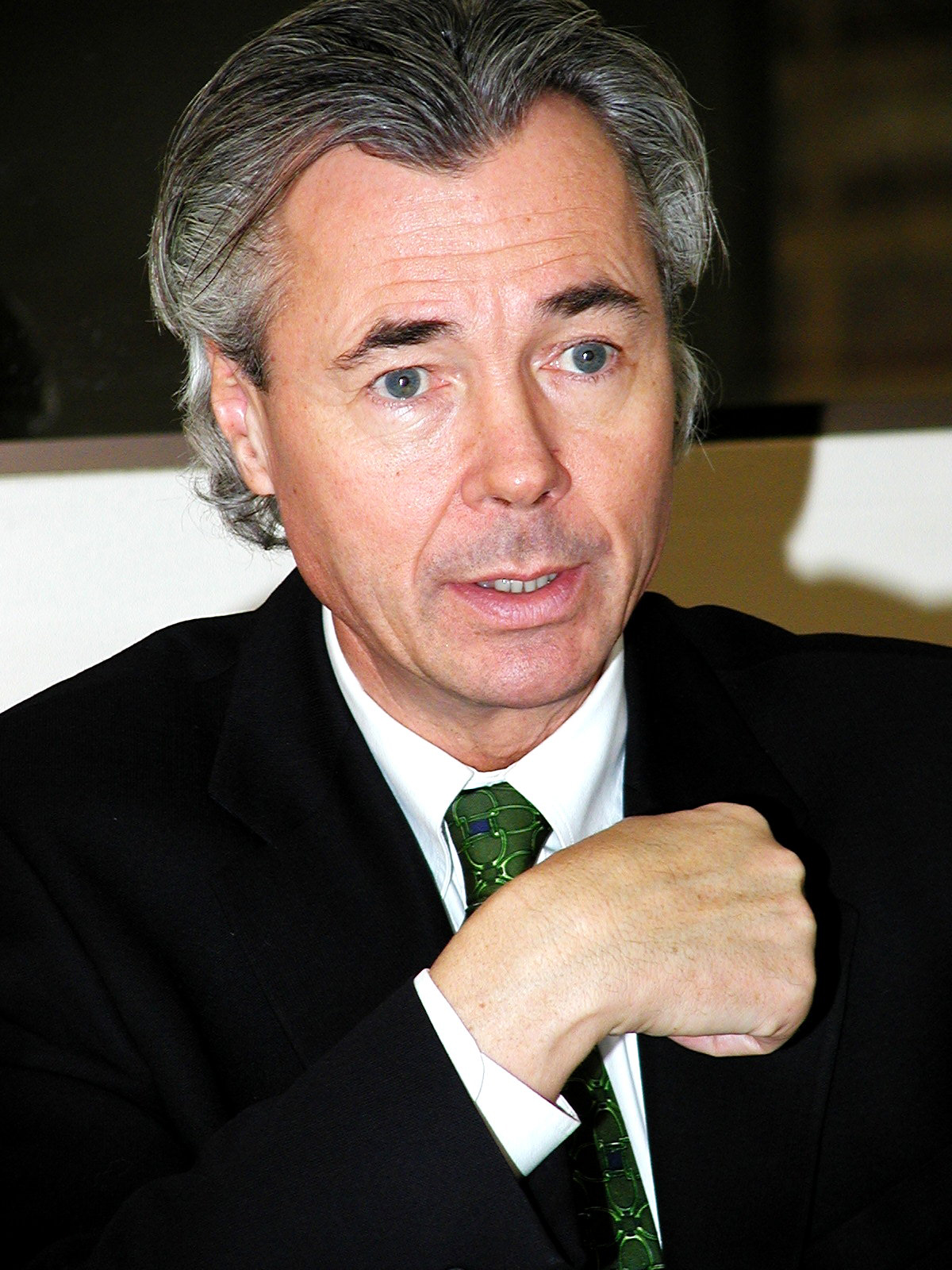
Pettigrew in 2006

From 1996 to 1999, he also served as Minister of Human Resources Development. In that time, the Department of Human Resources Development represented more than half of the Canadian federal budget. Pettigrew negotiated with the provinces and the territories the National Child Benefit, the most important social program since Canada Pension Plan (1966), a 10 billions program by now. He implemented the new Employment Insurance Program which became balanced after years of deficit despite lowering the premiums. Under his watch, however, ineffective accounting practices at HRDC allegedly left millions of dollars unaccounted for. Pettigrew was fortunate to have been shuffled to the portfolio of International Trade. His successor Jane Stewart took the brunt of the "billion-dollar boondoggle" scandal.

As Minister for International Trade, he promoted free trade and always characterized the North American Free Trade Agreement (NAFTA) as "a tremendous success". and a model to expand upon. He was a key participant in the World Trade Organization (WTO) trade talks, claiming that Canada's main goal of lowering agricultural subsidies would be of great benefit to the world's poorer nations. At the 2003 WTO Ministerial Conference in Cancún, Pettigrew played an aggressive role as chair of the working group on the Singapore issues, controversial sectors of proposed liberalization which were bitterly opposed by some developing nation delegates, not to mention masses of protesters outside of the gates where the meetings were held. He also championed the Free Trade Area of the Americas (FTAA), and in the period leading up to the Summit of the Americas in Quebec City in 2001, he spearheaded a campaign to allay growing public suspicion of the deal by promising the eventual release of the draft negotiating texts. After a delay due to translating the texts into the Portuguese language, the texts were made publicly available July 3, 2001. Throughout his mandate at International Trade, he was heavily embroiled in the US - Canada softwood lumber dispute.

On December 12, 2003, he was appointed Minister of Health and Minister of Intergovernmental Affairs by newly appointed Prime Minister Paul Martin. On July 20, 2004, he moved to his long-desired portfolio of Foreign Affairs minister, replacing Bill Graham.

On April 26, 2005, the Montreal newspaper Le Devoir reported that the trilingual Pettigrew, who speaks English, French and Spanish, would leave Canadian politics to serve as the Secretary General of the Organization of American States. The newspaper suggested that Pettigrew had sufficient support among OAS members to win the job, although officially Canada supported the election of Luis Ernesto Derbez of Mexico in the 2005 OAS Secretary General election.

Pettigrew has long been rumoured to be a possible leadership candidate for the Liberal Party of Canada or as a leader of the Liberal Party of Quebec.

In 1999, Pettigrew wrote Pour une politique de la confiance (English translation: The New Politics of Confidence), a book on globalization and the art of governing.

On June 17, 2005, an incident occurred at a conference in Montreal regarding the subject of Haiti, at one point during the conference, Pettigrew was splashed with a red substance by Yves Engler, a political activist associated with the group Haiti Action Montreal. As Engler threw the red substance on Pettigrew, he shouted "Pettigrew lies, Haitians die". Engler claimed that the red paint was meant to symbolize the blood on the hands of the Canadian state due to Canada's involvement in Haiti. Pettigrew told police that he wanted full charges pressed against Engler. However, a couple of days later, Pettigrew suddenly decided to drop all charges.

Despite growing pressure, Pettigrew consistently stated that Canada would "stay the course" in Haiti.

On December 28, 2005, Pettigrew was the victim of an attempted mugging while he was waiting for a train in the Montreal subway station. The accused, Frederick Estelle, has been charged with aggravated theft.

At the 2004 election, Pettigrew was nearly defeated by a Bloc Québécois challenger – only the second time that the Liberals' hold on the riding had been seriously threatened. At the 2006 election, Pettigrew was defeated by Bloc challenger Vivian Barbot.

== Post-political career ==
On October 23, 2006, Deloitte Canada's Managing Partner and Chief Executive Alan MacGibbon announced that Pierre Pettigrew had been appointed as Executive Advisor for the firm's international activities. Pettigrew is a member of the Inter-American Dialogue.

He was awarded an honorary Doctor of Laws degree by the University of Warwick in July 2008.

In August 2016, Pettigrew was appointed special envoy on the Comprehensive Economic and Trade Agreement between Canada and the European Union.

He currently resides in Toronto.

== Electoral record ==
2006 Canadian federal election: Papineau
Party	Candidate	Votes	%	±%	Expenditures
Bloc Québécois	Vivian Barbot	17,775	40.75	+0.79	$50,886
Liberal	Pierre Pettigrew	16,785	38.48	-2.62	$75,541
Conservative	Mustaque Sarker	3,630	8.32	+3.55	$34,951
New Democratic	Marc Hasbani	3,358	7.70	-1.07	$2,568
Green	Louis-Philippe Verenka	1,572	3.60	+1.03	$181
Marxist–Leninist	Peter Macrisopoulos	317	0.73	+0.32	
Canadian Action	Mahmood-Raza Baig	185	0.42	–	$2,007
Total valid votes/Expense limit		43,622	100.00	$76,023	

2004 Canadian federal election: Papineau
Party	Candidate	Votes	%	±%	Expenditures
Liberal	Pierre Pettigrew	16,892	41.10	-13.00	
Bloc Québécois	Martine Carrière	16,424	39.96	+13.36	$48,511
New Democratic	André Frappier	3,603	8.77	+4.29	$28,566
Conservative	Mustaque Sarker	1,961	4.77	-2.74	$38,564
Green	Adam Jastrzebski	1,058	2.57	+0.02	
Marijuana	Christelle Dusablon-Pelletier	490	1.19	-0.81	
Communist	André Parizeau	252	0.61		$825
Independent	Jimmy Garoufalis	250	0.61		$2,607
Marxist–Leninist	Peter Macrisopoulos	169	0.41	+0.68	
Total valid votes/Expense limit		41,099	100.00	$75,103	
Note: Conservative vote is compared to the total of the Canadian Alliance vote and Progressive Conservative vote in 2000 election, and not the vote Sarker received as an independent candidate.

2000 Canadian federal election: Papineau—Saint-Denis
Party	Candidate	Votes	%	±%
Liberal	Pierre Pettigrew	23,955	54.10	+0.20
Bloc Québécois	Philippe Ordenes	11,779	26.60	-2.31
Alliance	Yannis Felemegos	2,114	4.77	-8.01
New Democratic	Hans Marotte	1,983	4.48	+2.03
Progressive Conservative	Emmanuel Préville	1,215	2.74	-10.04
Green	Boris-Antoine Legault	1,128	2.55	
Marijuana	Antoine Théorêt-Poupart	886	2.00	
Independent	Mustaque Sarker	738	1.67	
Marxist–Leninist	Peter Macrisopoulos	482	1.09	+0.10
Total valid votes/Expense limit		44,280	100.00	

Note: Canadian Alliance vote compared to the vote Felemegos received as a Progressive Conservative candidate.

1997 Canadian federal election: Papineau—Saint-Denis
Party	Candidate	Votes	%	±%	Expenditures
Liberal	Pierre Pettigrew	26,260	53.90	–	$53,271
Bloc Québécois	Mario Beaulieu	14,083	28.91		$25,032
Progressive Conservative	Yannis Felemegos	6,227	12.78		$19,274
New Democratic	Gaby Kombé	1,196	2.45		$3,030
Marxist–Leninist	Peter Macrisopoulos	481	0.99		$0
Communist League	Michel Dugré	471	0.97		$270
Total valid votes		48,718	100.00		
Total rejected ballots		1,676			
Turnout		50,394	75.55		
Electors on the lists		66,706			
Sources: Official Results, Elections Canada and official contributions and expenses submitted by the candidates, provided by Elections Canada.

== Notes ==
27th Canadian Ministry (2003–2006) – Cabinet of Paul Martin
Cabinet posts (3)
Predecessor	Office	Successor
Bill Graham	Minister of Foreign Affairs; 2004–2006	Peter MacKay
Anne McLellan	Minister of Health; 2003–2004	Ujjal Dosanjh
Stéphane Dion	Minister of Intergovernmental Affairs; 2003–2004	Lucienne Robillard
Special Cabinet Responsibilities
Predecessor	Title	Successor
?	Minister responsible for Official Languages; 2003–2004	Mauril Bélanger
26th Canadian Ministry (1993–2003) – Cabinet of Jean Chrétien
Cabinet posts (3)
Predecessor	Office	Successor
Sergio Marchi	Minister for International Trade; 1999–2003	Jim Peterson
Doug Young	Minister of Human Resources Development; 1996–1999	Jane Stewart
position created	Minister for International Cooperation; 1996	Don Boudria
Special Cabinet Responsibilities
Predecessor	Title	Successor
position created	Minister responsible for La Francophonie; 1996	Don Boudria
Parliament of Canada
Preceded by André Ouellet	Member of Parliament for Papineau—Saint-Michel; 1996–1997	Succeeded by The electoral district was abolished in 1996.
Preceded by The electoral district was created in 1996.	Member of Parliament for Papineau—Saint-Denis; 1997–2004	Succeeded by The electoral district was abolished in 2003.
Preceded by The electoral district was created in 2003.	Member of Parliament for Papineau; 2004–2006	Succeeded by Vivian Barbot
