= Georges-Albini Lacombe =

Canadian politician

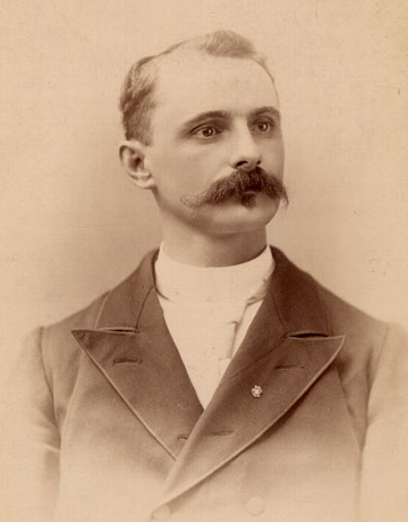

Member of the Legislative Assembly of Quebec for Montréal division no. 1
- In office 1897–1908
- Preceded by: François Martineau
- Succeeded by: Napoléon Séguin

Personal details
- Born: January 13, 1864 Lavaltrie, Canada East
- Died: May 17, 1941 (aged 77) Cartierville, Quebec
- Party: Liberal

Georges-Albini Lacombe (French pronunciation: [ʒɔʁʒ albini lakɔ̃b]; January 13, 1864 – May 17, 1941) was a Canadian physician, lawyer, and politician.

Born in Lavaltrie, Canada East, Lacombe was educated at the School of Medicine and Surgery of Montreal (now the Université de Montréal Faculty of Medicine) and the University of Winnipeg where he became a physician in 1886.

From 1886 to 1891, he practised medicine in an Indian reserve for the Government of Manitoba and for the Canadian Pacific Railway. He also practised in Faribault, Minnesota. In 1891, he was appointed a professor of anatomy in Bishop's College. Moving to Montreal, he was called to the Bar of Quebec in 1901 and practised law in Montreal until 1908.

He was elected to the Legislative Assembly of Quebec for Montréal division no. 1 in 1897. A Liberal, he was re-elected in 1900, 1904, and 1908. In 1908, he was appointed Registrar of the division of Hochelaga and Jacques Cartier. He would hold this position until 1922 when he returned to his medical practice in Lavaltrie.

He died in Cartierville, Quebec in 1941.
