= André Ouellet =

Canadian politician

The Honourable André Ouellet PC KC

Minister of Foreign Affairs
- In office May 13, 1995 – January 24, 1996
- Prime Minister: Jean Chrétien
- Preceded by: Position established
- Succeeded by: Lloyd Axworthy

Secretary of State for External Affairs
- In office November 4, 1993 – May 13, 1995
- Prime Minister: Jean Chrétien
- Preceded by: Perrin Beatty
- Succeeded by: Office abolished

Minister of Labour
- In office August 12, 1983 – September 17, 1984
- Prime Minister: Pierre Trudeau; John Turner
- Preceded by: Charles Caccia
- Succeeded by: Bill McKnight

Minister of Public Works
- In office November 24, 1978 – June 3, 1979
- Prime Minister: Pierre Trudeau
- Preceded by: J. Judd Buchanan
- Succeeded by: Erik Nielsen

Member of Parliament for Papineau
- In office May 29, 1967 – March 25, 1996
- Preceded by: Guy Favreau
- Succeeded by: Pierre Pettigrew

Personal details
- Born: April 6, 1939 (age 87)
- Party: Liberal

André Ouellet (French: [ɑ̃dʁe wɛlɛt]), PC KC (born April 6, 1939) is a former longtime Liberal federal politician and cabinet member in Canada. Following his political career, he served as chairman of Canada Post.

== Political career ==
First elected to the House of Commons of Canada in a 1967 by-election, Ouellet served in a number of different positions in the cabinets of Prime Ministers Pierre Trudeau and Jean Chrétien. In his capacity as Registrar General of Canada, he was one of the four signatories of the Proclamation of the Constitution Act of 1982 (along with Queen Elizabeth II, Trudeau, and Chrétien). Ouellet represented the safe Liberal seat of Papineau in Montreal for almost thirty years. His hold on the seat was only seriously threatened when the Liberals were crushed by the Progressive Conservative Party in the election of 1984, when he retained his seat by only 701 votes. In opposition, Ouellet became the Liberal's leading figure in the constitutional negotiations that led to the Charlottetown Accord, and was a strong advocate for the constitutional reform proposal, which was rejected in a 1992 referendum.

With the return to power of the Liberals after the 1993 election, Ouellet was appointed Minister of Foreign Affairs by the new prime minister, Chrétien. Ouellet was a principled and pragmatic Minister of Foreign Affairs. Despite being a power-broker in his native province, Ouellet was out of step with the political climate in Quebec. After the close result of the 1995 Quebec referendum, Chrétien wanted to present a new face of his government in Quebec. In 1996, Chrétien appointed Ouellet to head the Canada Post Corporation. Ouellet's seat in the House of Commons was taken by Pierre Pettigrew in a by-election later that year.

As cabinet minister, Ouellet had served as Postmaster General. As chairman of Canada Post, he implemented reform that led to record profits in the corporation. In 2004, controversy surrounded Ouellet as Canada Post was one of the organizations embroiled in the Sponsorship Scandal. As a result, Ouellet was suspended from his position at Canada Post in February 2004 by Prime Minister Paul Martin. He retired as chairman of Canada Post on August 12, 2004, after it was revealed he spent hundreds of thousands of dollars on expenses and that he handed out an untendered contract.

== Electoral record (partial) ==
1993 Canadian federal election: Papineau—Saint-Michel
Party	Candidate	Votes	%	±%	Expenditures
Liberal	André Ouellet	20,064	51.98	+5.99	$41,411
Bloc Québécois	Daniel Boucher	15,148	39.24		$18,649
Progressive Conservative	Carmen de Pontbriand	1,686	4.37	−28.86	$26,388a
New Democratic Party	Gisèle Charlebois	708	1.83	−13.27	$477
Natural Law	André Beaudoin	678	1.76		$386
Marxist-Leninist	Serge Lachapelle	141	0.37	−0.12	$80
Abolitionist	P.A. D'Aoust	98	0.25		$0
Commonwealth	Normand Normandeau	78	0.20	−0.24	$0
Total valid votes		38,601	100.00		
Total rejected ballots		1,241			
Turnout		39,842	75.45	+5.31	
Electors on the lists		52,808			
a Does not include unpaid claims. Source: Thirty-fifth General Election, 1993: Official Voting Results, Published by the Chief Electoral Officer of Canada. Financial figures taken from the official contributions and expenses submitted by the candidates, provided by Elections Canada.

1988 Canadian federal election: Papineau
Party	Candidate	Votes	%	±%	Expenditures
Liberal	André Ouellet	18,122	45.99	–	$43,413
Progressive Conservative	Frank Venneri	13,094	33.23		$39,468
New Democratic	Giovanni Adamo	5,948	15.10		$22,192
Rhinoceros	Carole Ola Clermont	987	2.51	–	$0
Green	H. Joseph Vega	469	1.19	–	$0
Communist	Line Chabot	235	0.60		$18
Marxist–Leninist	Francine Tremblay	193	0.49		$130
Revolutionary Workers League	Michel Dugré	178	0.45		$513
Commonwealth of Canada	Normand Bélanger	174	0.44		$0
Total valid votes		39,400	100.00		
Total rejected ballots		907			
Turnout		40,307	70.14		
Electors on the lists		57,470			
Source: Report of the Chief Electoral Officer, Thirty-fourth General Election, 1988.

1984 Canadian federal election: Papineau
Party	Candidate	Votes	%
Liberal	André Ouellet	12,754	38.99
Progressive Conservative	Tony Iacobaccio	12,053	36.85
New Democratic	Paul Comtois	4,295	13.13
Rhinoceros	Christian Jolicoeur	1,925	5.89
Parti nationaliste	Gilles Maillé	1,169	3.57
Communist	Suzanne Dagenais	147	0.45
Social Credit	Roland Mireault	147	0.45
Commonwealth of Canada	Gilles Gervais	113	0.35
Non-affiliated	Doris Lacroix	104	0.32
Total valid votes		32,707	100.00
Total rejected ballots		659	
Turnout		33,366	70.36
Electors on the lists		47,423	
Source: Report of the Chief Electoral Officer, Thirty-third General Election, 1984.

26th Canadian Ministry (1993–2003) – Cabinet of Jean Chrétien
Cabinet posts (2)
Predecessor	Office	Successor
legislation enacted	Minister of Foreign Affairs; 1995–1996	Lloyd Axworthy
Perrin Beatty	Secretary of State for External Affairs; 1993–1995 styled as Minister of Foreign Affairs	legislation enacted
Parliament of Canada
Preceded by Guy Favreau	Member of Parliament for Papineau; 1967–1988	Succeeded by The electoral district was abolished in 1987.
Preceded by The electoral district was created in 1987.	Member of Parliament for Papineau—Saint-Michel; 1988–1996	Succeeded by Pierre Pettigrew
