= Adrien Meunier =

Canadian politician

Member of Parliament for Papineau
- In office August 1953 – February 1963

Personal details
- Born: 24 December 1905 Saint-Liboire, Quebec
- Died: 31 October 1971 (aged 65)
- Party: Liberal; Independent Liberal; Liberal
- Profession: Lawyer

Adrien Meunier (24 December 1905 – 31 October 1971) was a Canadian lawyer and politician. Meunier was a Liberal party, initially independent Liberal, member of the House of Commons of Canada. He was born in Saint-Liboire, Quebec and became a lawyer by career.

He first attempted to win a House of Commons seat in the 1949 federal election at Papineau but was defeated by independent candidate Camillien Houde. Meunier won the riding in the 1953 election as an independent Liberal candidate defeating official Liberal candidate Émile Dufresne. Meunier was then re-elected to successive terms in Parliament in the 1957, 1958 and 1962 federal elections. After completing his term in the 25th Canadian Parliament, Meunier did not campaign for another term in Parliament and left federal political office.
