= Montréal–Sainte-Marie =

Quebec electoral district

Defunct provincial electoral district
- Legislature: National Assembly of Quebec
- District created: 1912
- District abolished: 1965
- First contested: 1912
- Last contested: 1962

Montréal–Sainte-Marie (French pronunciation: [mɔ̃ʁeal sɛ̃t maʁi]) was a former provincial electoral district in the Montreal region of Quebec, Canada that elected members to the Legislative Assembly of Quebec.

It was created for the 1912 election from part of Montréal division no. 1 electoral district. Its final election was in 1962. It disappeared in the 1966 election and its successor electoral district was Sainte-Marie.

== Members of the Legislative Assembly ==
- Napoleon Séguin, Liberal (1912–1921)
- Joseph Gauthier, Parti Ouvrier (1921–1923)
- Camillien Houde, Conservative Party (1923–1927)
- Joseph Gauthier, Liberal (1927)
- Camillien Houde, Conservative Party (1928–1931)
- Gaspard Fauteux, Liberal (1931–1935)
- Candide Rochefort, Action liberale nationale – Union Nationale (1935–1939)
- Camillien Houde, Independent (1939–1944)
- Camille Côté, Union Nationale (1944–1948)
- Aime Gendron, Union Nationale (1948–1952)
- Yvon Dupuis, Liberal (1952–1956)
- Edgar Charbonneau, Union Nationale (1956–1966)
