= Adhémar Raynault =

Canadian politician

Mayor Adhémar Raynault
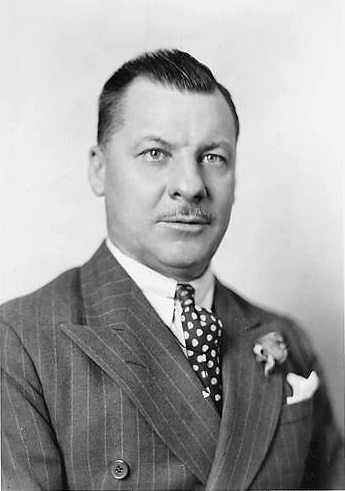

36th Mayor of Montreal
- In office 1936–1938
- Preceded by: Camillien Houde
- Succeeded by: Camillien Houde (returned)
- In office 1940–1944
- Preceded by: Camillien Houde
- Succeeded by: Camillien Houde (returned)

Personal details
- Born: 12 July 1891 Saint-Gérard-Majella, Quebec, Canada
- Died: 11 April 1984 (aged 92) Saint-Bruno-de-Montarville, Quebec, Canada
- Party: Union Nationale
- Profession: Businessman

Adhémar Raynault (12 July 1891 – 11 April 1984) was a Canadian politician and a Mayor of Montreal.

== Early life ==
Raynault was born on 12 July 1891, in Saint-Gérard-de-Magella. Raynault moved to Montreal in 1911. He started as a clerk in a trading house. He had several jobs before becoming an insurance broker. During this period, he continued to perfect his training in the evening, after work. Pretty quickly, he became an important personality in the business world.

== City politics ==
He was a city councillor for the district of Préfontaine in Montreal from 1934 to 1936. He also served as mayor from 1936 to 1938, and from 1940 to 1944. His last tenure as mayor was provisionally served while Camillien Houde was interned for wartime opposition to conscription.

== Member of the provincial Legislature ==
Raynault was elected to the Legislative Assembly of Quebec in the district of L'Assomption in the 1936 general election and sat with the Union Nationale. He did not run again in the 1939 general election.

== Personal life ==
He is the great-uncle of former MP Francine Raynault.

Political offices
Preceded by Georges Lalancette	City Councillor of Préfontaine; 1934–1936	Succeeded by Armand Taillon
National Assembly of Quebec
Preceded by Paul Gouin (ALN)	MLA, District of L'Assomption; 1936-1939	Succeeded by Bernard Bissonnette (Liberal)
