= Joe Young (politician) =

Joe Young (born c. 1947) is a Canadian political activist. He is a prominent member of the Communist League, and a frequent contributor to its newspaper, The Militant. Young has campaigned for federal, provincial and municipal office in Ontario and British Columbia.

Young has long been active in radical left politics. He was a member of the New Democratic Party's youth wing and the Young Socialists (the youth wing of the League for Socialist Action) in the early 1960s, and led a successful campaign to allow high school students to form political clubs. He became chairman of the Student Association to End the War in Vietnam in the late 1960s, and called for the immediate withdrawal of soldiers from that country. Young has worked in the industrial sector in his adult life, and is an active member of Canada's labour movement.

He was an airline cleaner at Pearson International Airport, and a member of the International Association of Machinists and Aerospace Workers in the early 1990s. He campaigned as the Communist League candidate in Parkdale for the 1990 provincial election, and called for the government to settle native land claims and pull Canadian soldiers out of the Persian Gulf. He was 43 years old at the time.

Testifying before a committee of the Legislative Assembly of Ontario in 1991, Young defended the right of the people of Quebec to choose their own future without interference from the rest of Canada. Later in the year, he was the Communist League's candidate for Mayor of Toronto. In this campaign, he proposed tighter guidelines for gun use by the Toronto police, and a shorter work week for all Torontonians. Young received 1,196 votes, or .61%.

Young subsequently moved to British Columbia, where he worked as a machine operator and was a member of the United Steelworkers. He campaigned for Vancouver East in the 1993 federal election in Vancouver East. He moved to Montreal later in the 1990s, worked in a packing plant near the city, and was a member of United Food and Commercial Workers Local 501.

He again moved to British Columbia after this, and was the Communist League's sole candidate in the 2001 provincial election, running in Vancouver-Langara and receiving 105 votes. He continued to work in the meat-packing industry.
