= 1927 Quebec general election =

Canadian provincial election

- May 16, 1927

85 seats in the 17th Legislative Assembly of Quebec 43 seats were needed for a majority
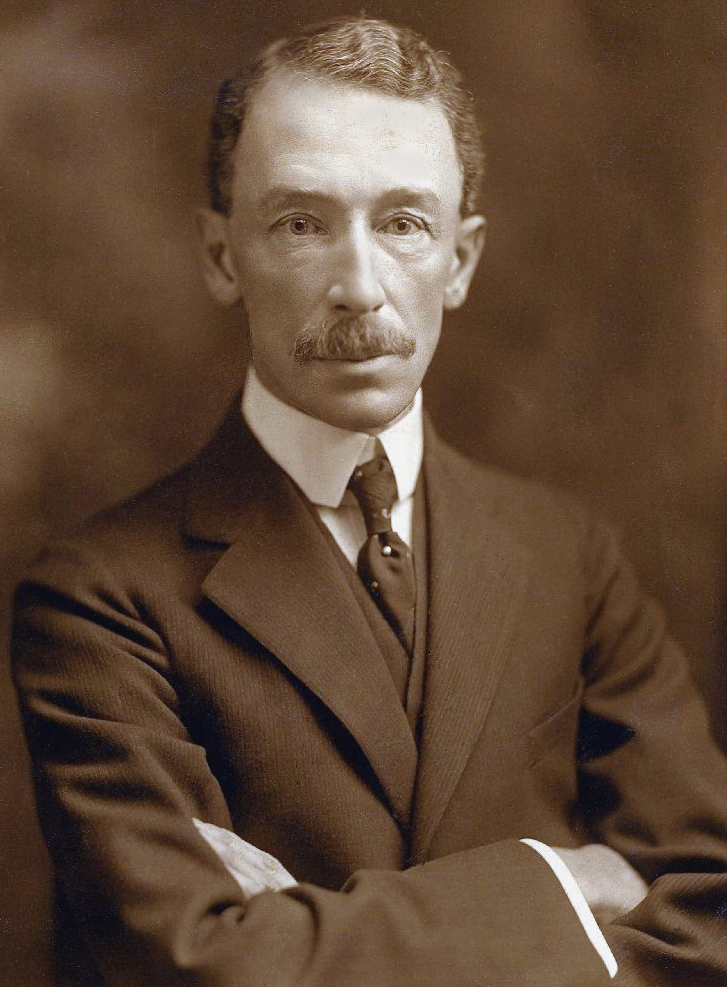

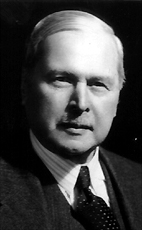
	First party	Second party
Leader	Louis-Alexandre Taschereau	Arthur Sauvé
Party	Liberal	Conservative
Leader since	1920	1915
Leader's seat	Montmorency	Deux-Montagnes
Last election	64 seats, 51.52%	20 seats, 39.32%
Seats won	74	9
Seat change	▲10	▼11
Popular vote	188,687	109,105
Percentage	59.33%	34.31%
Swing	▲7.81pp	▼5.01pp
Premier before election
Louis-Alexandre Taschereau
Liberal
Premier after election
Louis-Alexandre Taschereau
Liberal

The 1927 Quebec general election was held on May 16, 1927, to elect members of the Legislative Assembly of the Province of Quebec, Canada. The incumbent Quebec Liberal Party, led by Louis-Alexandre Taschereau, was re-elected, defeating the Quebec Conservative Party, led by Arthur Sauvé.

It was the second general election victory in a row for Louis-Alexandre Taschereau, who had held office since 1920.

== Results ==
Twelve Liberal MLAs were returned by acclamation, including one on the Island of Montreal. Taschereau himself was acclaimed in Montmorency, because of the alleged technical rejection of the Conservative candidate Lucien Drolet's nomination papers. Drolet would later sue the returning officer over this.

The Liberals won back six of the Montreal seats they had lost in 1923. There was a controversy in Montréal–Saint-Louis, where the Conservative candidate Louis Fitch claimed that he had been subject to false arrest on Election Day.

Polling was deferred to May 23 in Gaspé. This was because weather conditions caused the closure of many roads in the area.

Elections to the Legislative Assembly of Quebec (1927)
Political party	Party leader	MLAs				Votes			
Political party	Party leader	Candidates	1923	1927	±	#	±	%	± (pp)
Government candidates									
█ Liberal	Louis-Alexandre Taschereau	85	64	74	10▲	188,687	38,957▲	59.34	7.82▲
█ Independent	–	3	–	–	–	1,365	New	0.43	New
Opposition candidates									
█ Conservative	Arthur Sauvé	67	20	9	11▼	109,105	92,295▼	34.31	5.01▼
█ Liberal	–	–	1	–	1▼	Did not campaign (Note: Other allegiances not professed in 1927: Labour-Government; Independent-Conservative; Farmer-Opposition)			
█ Independent	–	3	–	–	–	2,685	2,246▼	0.84	0.86▼
█ Labour	–	1	–	1	1▲	4,432	1,993▲	1.39	0.55▲
Other candidates									
█ Independent-Liberal	–	7	–	1	1▲	9,345	3,759▲	2.94	1.02▲
█ Labour	–	1	–	–	–	2,342	1,417▲	0.74	0.42▲
Total		167	85			317,961		100%	
Rejected ballots						2,843	965▲		
Voter turnout						320,804	26,347▲	62.91	0.89▲
Registered electors (contested ridings only)						509,935	35,141▲		
Candidates returned by acclamation				12	4▲				

Popular vote
PLQ	59.33%
PCQ	34.31%
Others	6.36%

Seats summary
PLQ	87.06%
PCQ	10.59%
Others	2.35%

== See also ==
- List of Quebec premiers
- Politics of Quebec
- Timeline of Quebec history
- List of Quebec political parties
- 17th Legislative Assembly of Quebec
