= Maurice Dupras =

Canadian politician

Member of Parliament for Labelle electoral district
- In office November 1970 – July 1984
- Preceded by: Léo Cadieux
- Succeeded by: Fernand Ladouceur

Personal details
- Born: 13 September 1923 Saint-Jérôme, Quebec, Canada
- Died: 31 December 2009 (aged 86) Ottawa, Ontario, Canada
- Party: Liberal
- Profession: businessman, insurance broker

Maurice Dupras (13 September 1923 – 31 December 2009) was a Liberal party member of the House of Commons of Canada. He was a businessman and insurance broker by career.

Dupras was born in Saint-Jérôme, Quebec. He served in World War II with the Royal Canadian Air Force from 1942 to 1945.

He won election at the Labelle electoral district in a November 1970 by-election and was re-elected there in the 1972, 1974, 1979 and 1980 federal elections. His service in the House of Commons thus began in the latter part of the 28th Parliament.

In July 1984, near the end of the 32nd Canadian Parliament, he was appointed Consul General at Bordeaux, France but was dismissed when the Conservative administration under Brian Mulroney was elected to power later that year. Dupras filed a lawsuit in response to his dismissal which concluded with an out-of-court settlement.

Dupras died in Ottawa on 31 December 2009, age 86.
