= Brenda O'Neill =

- O'Neill in 2023
- Education: Brock University; McMaster University; University of British Columbia
- Scientific career
- Fields: Political science
- Workplaces: University of Lethbridge; University of Manitoba; University of Calgary; Carleton University

Brenda Lee O'Neill is a Canadian political scientist and academic administrator. She is a professor of political science at Carleton University.

== Life ==
O'Neill earned a B.A. in economics and politics with honours from Brock University. She completed a M.A. in economics and an M.A. in public policy and administration at McMaster University. She earned a Ph.D. in political science at University of British Columbia.

O'Neill was a faculty member at the University of Lethbridge. She was graduate chair in the department of political studies and provost at University of Manitoba University College. She was head of the department of political science at University of Calgary. O'Neill is professor of political science and dean of the faculty of public and global affairs at Carleton University.

== Selected works ==
- Everitt, Joanna Marie; O'Neill, Brenda Lee, eds. (2002). Citizen Politics: Research and Theory in Canadian Political Behaviour. Oxford University Press. ISBN 978-0-19-541447-9.
- O'Neill, Brenda Lee; Gidengil, Elisabeth, eds. (2006). Gender and Social Capital. Routledge. ISBN 978-0-415-95022-0.
