= André Blais =

Canadian political scientist

- Born: Drummondville, Quebec, Canada
- Education: Laval University; York University
- Known for: Research on elections
- Awards: Acfas Prix Marcel-Vincent (1996); Killam Prize (2019); Prix Léon-Gérin (2021)
- Scientific career
- Fields: Political science
- Institutions: University of Montreal
- Thesis: Politique agricole et résultats électoraux en milieu agricole au Québec (1978)
- Website: www.andreblais.ca

André Blais (born 24 January 1947) is a Canadian political scientist, a professor emeritus in the department of political science at the University of Montreal. His research specialization is electoral studies.

== Early life and education ==
Blais was born in Drummondville, Quebec. He earned his bachelor's degree in political science from Université Laval and master's and doctoral degrees from York University. His doctoral dissertation was "Politique agricole et résultats électoraux en milieu agricole au Québec".

== Career ==
At the University of Montreal, where he is now professor emeritus, Blais has headed the research group in electoral studies since 2001, initially as a Tier I Canada Research Chair and since 2015 as holder of a University Research Chair. From 1988 to 1993 he was an investigator in the Canadian Election Study; from 1997 to 2006 he was principal investigator. He is a former president of the Canadian Political Science Association, and a former chair of the Comparative Study of Electoral Systems.

== Honors ==
Blais became a fellow of the Royal Society of Canada in 1999. In 1996, he was awarded the Prix Marcel-Vincent by Acfas. He won the 2019 Killam Prize for Social Sciences. In 2021, he received the Prix Léon-Gérin, one of the Prix du Québec.

== Selected works ==
- Blais, André (2000). To Vote or not to Vote. The merits and limits of rational choice theory. Pittsburgh: University of Pittsburgh Press. ISBN 0-8229-4129-5.
- Nevitte, Neil; Blais, André; Gidengil, Elisabeth; Nadeau, Richard (2000). Unsteady State: The 1997 Canadian Federal Election. Don Mills, Ontario: Oxford University Press. ISBN 978-0-19-541466-0.
- Fournier, Patrick; van der Kolk, Henk; Carty, R.Kenneth; Blais, André; Rose, Jonathan (2011). When Citizens Decide. Lessons from citizen assemblies on electoral reform. Oxford: Oxford University Press. ISBN 978-0-19-956784-3.
