= Richard Rose (political scientist) =

American political scientist (born 1933)

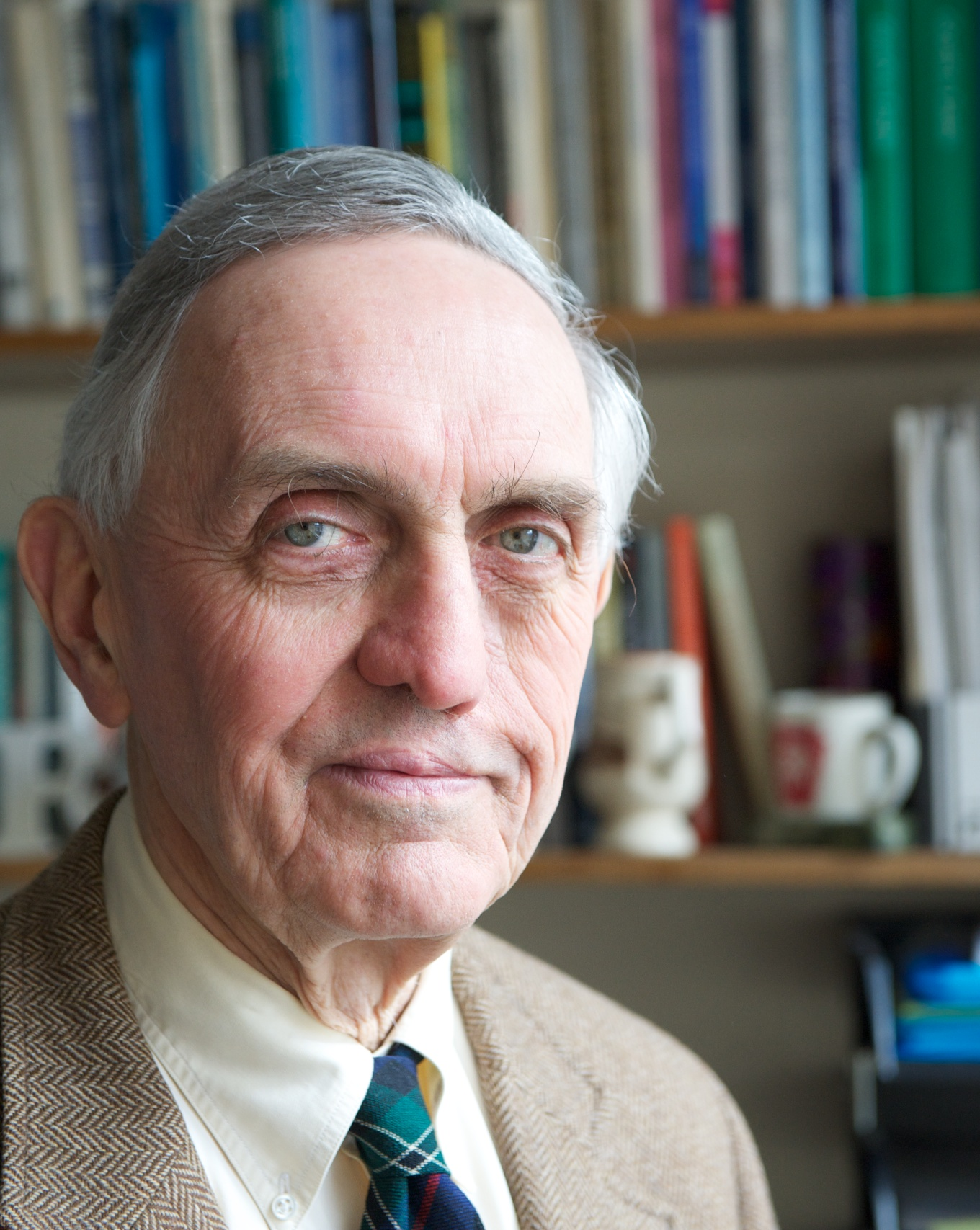
- Born: April 9, 1933 (age 93); St Louis, Missouri
- Occupations: Political scientist, author and academic

Academic background
- Education: B.A. Comparative Literature and Drama; D.Phil. Social Studies
- Alma mater: Johns Hopkins University; London School of Economics; Oxford University
- Thesis: The Relation of Socialist Principles to British Labour Foreign Policy 1945-51 (1960)

Academic work
- Institutions: University of Strathclyde (UOS)

Richard Rose is a political scientist, author, and academic whose comparative studies in social science have significantly influenced political science and public policy in both practice and theory. He is a Professor and Director of the Centre for the Study of Public Policy at the University of Strathclyde (UOS) in Scotland, and is a visiting fellow at the Robert Schuman Centre of the European University Institute and the WZB Berlin Social Science Center.

Rose is most known for his research in the comparative study of public policy, employing both quantitative and qualitative analyses.

Rose's publications encompass peer-reviewed articles and books covering democracy, elections and parties, governance, public expenditure and the welfare state. He has received numerous awards, including honorary doctorates from the European University Institute in Florence and Orebro University in Sweden, as well as lifetime achievement awards from various organizations such as the Political Studies Association of the United Kingdom, the European Consortium for Political Research, the Policy Studies Organization, and the Comparative Study of Electoral Systems (CSES).

Rose is also Fellow of the British Academy, Royal Society of Edinburgh, a Former Fellow of Woodrow Wilson International Center. He is an honorary foreign member of the American Academy of Arts and Sciences, and Finnish Academy of Science and Letters, and was a founding editor of the Journal of Public Policy.

== Early life and education ==
Rose was born on 9 April 1933 in St. Louis Missouri. He took his undergraduate degree at Johns Hopkins University in comparative literature in 1953 and was a graduate student at the London School of Economics from 1953 to 1954. He pursued studies at Oxford, graduating with a DPhil from Nuffield College with a thesis, titled "The Relation of Socialist Principles to British Labour Foreign Policy 1945-51."

== Career ==
Rose started his career as a lecturer in the Department of Government at the University of Manchester in 1960. In 1966, he assumed the role of Professor of Politics at UOS in Glasgow, Scotland where he established the Centre for the Study of Public Policy the first public policy center in a European university. He was the Sixth Century Professor of Politics at the University of Aberdeen from 2005 to 2011. He has held visiting academic appointments at various institutions, including the Oxford University Internet Institute, Cambridge University, Stanford, Johns Hopkins University, Central European University, and the Chinese University of Hong Kong. He has also been a visiting fellow at the Brookings Institution, the American Enterprise Institute, the International Monetary Fund, the Max Planck Institute for Transformation Research Berlin, the Paul Lazarsfeld Gesellschaft and the European Centre for Social Policy Research, Vienna. Since 2012, he has been serving as a Research Professor and Director of the Centre for the Study of Public Policy at University of Strathclyde.

Rose has contributed to the development of political science throughout his professional career, including co-founding the European Consortium for Political Science and establishing the British Politics Group of the American Political Science Association, and serving as the secretary of the Committee on Political Sociology of the International Sociological Association from 1970 to 1985.

In his public affairs work, Rose has provided consultations for British parliamentary committees, the European Parliament, the Council of Europe, OECD, the World Bank, and UN agencies. In 2007, drawing on insights from the Northern Ireland conflict, he presented a parable on conflict in divided states during an Oval Office meeting with President George W. Bush. In addition, he has been an election night commentator on television for BBC and RTE, and was the first by-lined political commentator of The Times (London) in 1964 and contributed to the Daily Telegraph in London, The Economist, and Times Higher Education. Since 1998, he has volunteered as a consultant for Transparency International's Global Barometer Surveys on corruption and has written a monthly online commentary discussing the electoral implications of public opinion polls since 2023.

== Research ==
Rose has made contributions to the study of political science. He has authored articles and books in political science, economics, sociology, public administration, law, social policy, geography, and social medicine.

Rose's first books were about British politics and elections, starting with The British General Election of 1959 with D. E. Butler (1960), followed by works such as Politics in England (1965) and How Sick Is British Democracy? (2021), which delved into British politics and elections. Expanding his scope to cover various regions of the United Kingdom, he authored Governing without Consensus: An Irish Perspective (1971) and Understanding the United Kingdom (1982). His comparative studies of parties and elections in Europe combining quantitative and institutional data have included, The International Almanac of Electoral Behavior (1991) co-authored with T. Mackie, Do Parties Make a Difference? (1984), and Representing Europeans: A Pragmatic Approach (2015). Adding to his body of work in this field, his book titled, How Referendums Challenge European Democracy: Brexit and Beyond was published in 2020. The UK Political Studies Association annually awards a Richard Rose prize to a political scientist under the age of 40 who has made a distinctive contribution to the study of British politics.

In comparative public policy, Rose has produced books, beginning with Can Government Go Bankrupt? co-authored with B.G. Peters in 1978 and Understanding Big Government (1985). These books have been followed by numerous other works on public employment, taxation, laws, and inheritance in public policy. Concurrently, he conducted comparative studies of heads of government Presidents and Prime Ministers which he edited with E. Suleiman in 1980, The Post-Modern President: The White House Meets the World (1991), and The Prime Minister in a Shrinking World (2001). His theoretically informed study of learning lessons from other countries was set out in Lesson-Drawing in Time and Space (1993), a how-to-do-it book called Learning from Comparative Public Policy: A Practical Guide (2005), and The Welfare State East and West with Rei Shiratori in 1986. He also authored Welfare Goes Global: Making Progress and Catching Up (2024) which compares health, education and female employment of people living in countries with 95 percent of the world's population. In recognition of his contributions to comparative public policy, a 14-chapter volume titled The Problem of Governing: Essays for Richard Rose has been published.

Following the fall of the Berlin Wall, Rose created a series of New Democracy Barometer sample surveys to collect evidence about the political, economic and social transformation of post-Communist societies. Since 1991 he has conducted more than 100 nationwide sample surveys in eleven Central and East European countries that are member states of the European Union. These surveys also include the successor states of Yugoslavia, Belarus, and Ukraine and 20 nationwide surveys in Russia. His book Understanding Post-Communist Transformation: A Bottom-Up Approach (2009) gives a full list of articles and books analyzing that survey data. A spin-off based on this was a book called Bad Governance and Corruption, which analyses survey data from 125 countries covered by the Transparency International Global Corruption Barometer.

Rose has given a personal account of fieldwork across continents in a memoir titled Learning about Politics in Time and Space, including a chapter entitled "Reflections of a Comparative Social Scientist."

== Awards and honors ==
- 1992 – Fellow, The British Academy
- 1994 – Honorary Foreign Member, American Academy of Arts & Sciences
- 2000 – Lifetime Achievement Award, UK Political Studies Association
- 2008 – Lifetime Achievement Award, International Council for the Comparative Study of Electoral Systems
- 2009 – Sir Isaiah Berlin Lifetime Achievement Prize, UK Political Studies Association
- 2009 – Mattei Dogan Foundation Prize, The European Consortium for Political Research (ECPR)
- 2019 – Lifetime Career Achievement Award, International Public Policy Association
- 2019 – Fellow, Royal Society of Edinburgh

== Bibliography ==
=== Books ===
- Politics in England (1965) ISBN 978-0571064120
- Governing Without Consensus: An Irish Perspective (1971) ISBN 978-0571094233
- Can Government Go Bankrupt? (1978) ISBN 978-0333262801
- Understanding the United Kingdom: The Territorial Dimension in Government (1982) ISBN 978-0582295919
- Do Parties Make a Difference? (1984) ISBN 978-0333353233
- Understanding Big Government: The Programme Approach (1984) ISBN 978-0803997783
- The Postmodern President: The White House Meets the World (1988) ISBN 978-0934540742
- The International Almanac of Electoral History (1990) ISBN 978-0333452790
- Lesson-drawing in Public Policy: A Guide to Learning Across Time and Space (1993) ISBN 978-0934540322
- The Prime Minister in a Shrinking World (2001) ISBN 978-0745627298
- Russia Transformed: Developing Popular Support for a New Regime (2006) ISBN 978-0521871754
- The British General Election of 1959 (2008) ISBN 978-0333778685
- Understanding Post-Communist Transformation: A Bottom Up Approach (2008) ISBN 978-0415482189
- Representing Europeans: A Pragmatic Approach (2013) ISBN 978-0199654765
- Learning about Politics in Time and Space (2014) 978-1907301476
- Bad Governance and Corruption (2018) ISBN 978-3319928456
- How Referendums Challenge European Democracy: Brexit and Beyond (2020) ISBN 978-3030441166
- How Sick Is British Democracy? A Clinical Analysis (2021) ISBN 978-3030731229
- The Problem of Governing: Essays for Richard Rose (2023) ISBN 9783031408168
- Welfare Goes Global: Making Progress and Catching Up (2024) ISBN 978-0198908463

=== Selected articles ===
- Rose, R. (1991). What is lesson-drawing?. Journal of public policy, 11(1), 3-30.
- Mishler, W., & Rose, R. (1997). Trust, distrust and skepticism: Popular evaluations of civil and political institutions in post-communist societies. The journal of politics, 59(2), 418-451.
- Rose, R. (2000). How much does social capital add to individual health?. Social science & medicine, 51(9), 1421-1435.
- Rose, R., & Shin, D. C. (2001). Democratization backwards: The problem of third-wave democracies. British journal of political science, 31(2), 331-354.
- Mishler, W., & Rose, R. (2001). What are the origins of political trust? Testing institutional and cultural theories in post-communist societies. Comparative political studies, 34(1), 30-62.
- Rose, R., Bernhagen, P., & Borz, G. (2012). Evaluating competing criteria for allocating parliamentary seats. Mathematical Social Sciences, 63(2), 85-89.
- Rose, R. (2019). Referendum challenges to the EU's policy legitimacy–and how the EU responds. Journal of European Public Policy, 26(2), 207-225.
