= Henri Courtemanche =

Canadian politician (1916-1986)

The Hon. Henri Courtemanche

Member of the Canadian Parliament for Labelle
- In office 1949–1953
- Preceded by: Maurice Lalonde
- Succeeded by: Gustave Roy
- In office 1957–1960
- Preceded by: Gustave Roy
- Succeeded by: Gaston Clermont

Senator for Rougemont, Quebec
- In office January 20, 1960 – December 22, 1961
- Appointed by: John Diefenbaker
- Preceded by: Elie Beauregard
- Succeeded by: Jacques Flynn

Personal details
- Born: August 7, 1916 Mont-Laurier, Quebec
- Died: March 19, 1986 (aged 69)
- Party: Progressive Conservative

Henri Courtemanche, PC (August 7, 1916 – March 19, 1986) was a Canadian parliamentarian.

Born in Mont-Laurier, Quebec, the son of Victor Courtemanche and Louise Massé, he was educated at the Académie de Mont-Laurier, the Séminaire de St. Joseph de Mont-Laurier, the Collège Saint-Laurent and the Université de Montréal. Courtemanche was called to the Quebec bar in 1947 and practised law in Mont-Laurier and Montreal. In 1945, he married Gisèle Paquette, the daughter of Joseph-Henri-Albiny Paquette.

Courtemanche was first elected as the Progressive Conservative Member of Parliament for Labelle, Quebec, in the 1949 federal election. He was defeated in 1953 but returned to the House of Commons of Canada in the 1957 federal election. He had announced that he would run in the election as a "Nationalist Independent" - and ran and was elected as an "Independent Progressive Conservative". However, the election brought the Progressive Conservatives to power under John Diefenbaker with a minority government and Courtemanche rejoined the party within weeks of its election victory and was appointed Deputy Speaker of the House of Commons.

Diefenbaker elevated Courtemanche to his Cabinet as Secretary of State for Canada following the 1958 federal election that returned the Tories with a majority government. On January 20, 1960, Courtemanche resigned from Cabinet, reportedly for health reasons, and was appointed to the Senate.

In 1961, he became the centre of a scandal when a former hospital administrator alleged that Courtemanche was paid a 10% kickback on all government grants made to a Montreal hospital in the mid-1950s. Courtemanche claimed that the $66,000 he received in total were legal fees for his services. He subsequently said the money was paid as a fee for his lobbying efforts.

Ultimately, Courtemanche resigned his Senate seat on December 22, 1961, less than two years into his appointment, after an investigation into his activities found him "unworthy" of public office.
