= Gérard Girouard =

Canadian politician, lawyer, and professor

Member of Parliament for Labelle
- In office April 1963 – November 1965
- Preceded by: Gaston Clermont
- Succeeded by: Gaston Clermont

Personal details
- Born: 27 March 1933 Saint-Hyacinthe, Quebec
- Died: 22 May 2017 (aged 84)
- Party: Progressive Conservative; Social Credit
- Spouse: Shirley Morgan
- Profession: lawyer, professor of law

Gérard Girouard (born 27 March 1933 in Saint-Hyacinthe, Quebec – d. 22 May 2017) was a member of the House of Commons of Canada. He was a lawyer and professor of law by career.

The son of Joseph Girouard and Marie Roy, he was educated at the Séminaire de Mont-Laurier and the University of Ottawa, and practised law in Mont-Laurier. He was first elected at the Labelle riding in the 1963 general election as a Social Credit party candidate. On 23 April 1964, he left that party and joined the Progressive Conservative party caucus. After completing his term in the 26th Canadian Parliament, Girouard was defeated in the 1965 federal election at the Hull riding by Alexis Caron.

In 1955, he married Shirley Morgan.

He died on 22 May 2017 at St-Hyacinthe Hospital.
