= Henri Bourassa =

Canadian politician (1868–1952)

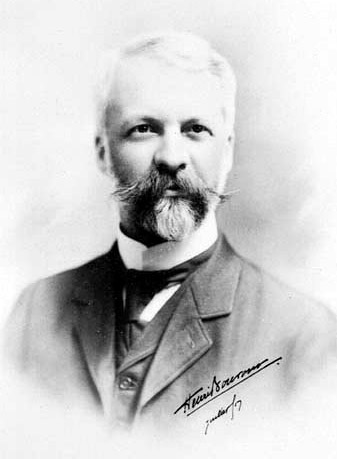
- Bourassa in 1917

Member of the Canadian Parliament for Labelle
- In office 1896–1907
- Preceded by: District created in 1892
- Succeeded by: Charles Beautron Major
- In office 1925–1935
- Preceded by: Hyacinthe-Adélard Fortier
- Succeeded by: Maurice Lalonde

Member of the Legislative Assembly of Quebec for Montréal division no. 2
- In office 1908–1909
- Preceded by: Lomer Gouin
- Succeeded by: Clément Robillard

Member of the Legislative Assembly of Quebec for Saint-Hyacinthe
- In office 1908–1912
- Preceded by: Joseph Morin
- Succeeded by: Télesphore-Damien Bouchard

Personal details
- Born: Joseph-Napoléon-Henri Bourassa; September 1, 1868 Montreal, Quebec, Canada
- Died: August 31, 1952 (aged 83) Outremont, Quebec
- Resting place: Notre Dame des Neiges Cemetery
- Party: Liberal (1896–1899); Independent (1900); Liberal (1900–1908); Independent (1925–1935)
- Other political affiliations: Ligue nationaliste
- Education: Polytechnique Montréal; College of the Holy Cross
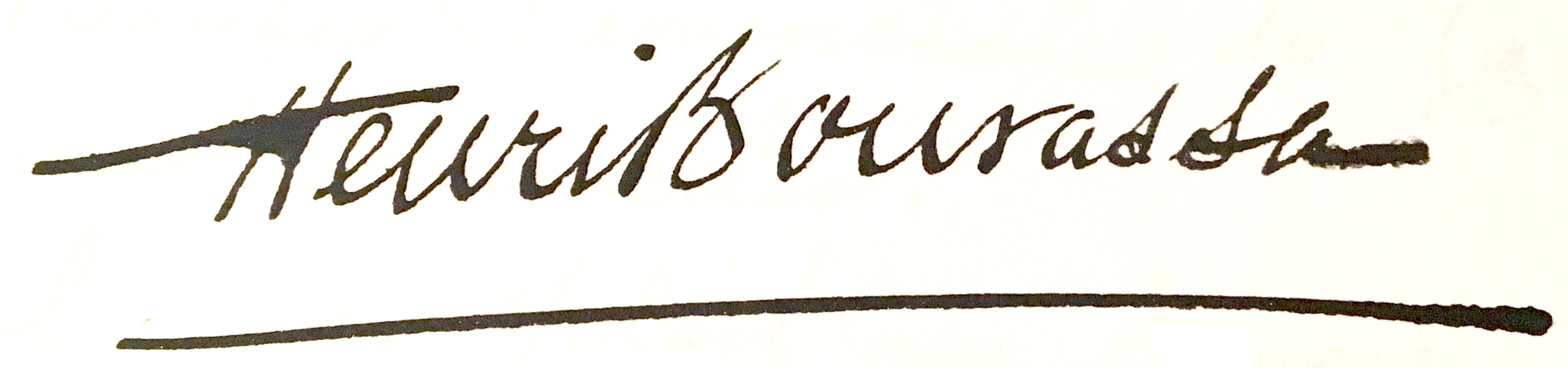
- Signature

Philosophical work
- Era: Philosophy in Canada
- Region: Western philosophy
- School: Nationalism, pacifism, social conservatism, ultramontanism
- Main interests: French Canadian nationalism, Canadian nationalism, Catholic social teaching
- Notable ideas: "Two founding peoples", language rights in Canada, Canadian autonomy, Canadian neutrality

Joseph-Napoléon-Henri Bourassa (French pronunciation: [ɑ̃ʁi buʁasa]; September 1, 1868 – August 31, 1952) was a French Canadian political leader and publisher. In 1899, Bourassa was outspoken against the British government's request for Canada to send a militia to fight for Britain in the Second Boer War. Prime Minister Sir Wilfrid Laurier's compromise was to send a volunteer force, but the seeds were sown for future conscription protests during the World Wars of the next half-century. Bourassa unsuccessfully challenged the proposal to build warships to help protect the empire. He led the opposition to conscription during World War I and argued that Canada's interests were not at stake. He opposed Catholic bishops who defended military support of Britain and its allies. Bourassa was an ideological father of French-Canadian nationalism. Bourassa was also a defining force in forging French Canada's attitude to the Canadian Confederation of 1867.

== Early life and education ==
Born in Montreal, Quebec, to Napoléon Bourassa and Azélie Papineau (Bourassa), Henri Bourassa was a grandson of the pro-democracy reformist politician Louis-Joseph Papineau. He was educated at École Polytechnique de Montréal and at the College of the Holy Cross in Worcester, Massachusetts. In 1890, he became mayor of the town of Montebello, Quebec, at the age of 22.

== Political career ==
In 1896, he was elected to the House of Commons as an independent Liberal for Labelle but resigned in 1899 to protest the sending of Canadian troops to the Second Boer War. He was re-elected soon after his resignation. He argued that Prime Minister Wilfrid Laurier was un vendu ("a sell-out") to the British Empire and its supporters in Canada.

To counter what he perceived to be the evils of imperialism, he created in 1903 the Ligue nationaliste canadienne (Canadian Nationalist League) to instill a pan-Canadian nationalist spirit in the francophone population. It opposed political dependence on either Britain or the United States and supported instead Canadian autonomy within the British Empire.

Bourassa left the federal parliament on May 11, 1907, but he remained active in Quebec politics by being elected to the Legislative Assembly of Quebec in the 1908 provincial election in Montréal division no. 2. He led the Ligue until he retired from the assembly on September 5, 1912. He continued to criticize Laurier, whose compromises mostly helped the British Empire. Bourassa opposed Laurier's attempts to build a Canadian Navy in 1910, which he believed would draw Canada into future wars between Britain and Germany. He supported the eventual creation of an independent navy but did not want it to be under British command, as Laurier had planned. Bourassa's attacks depleted Laurier's strength in Quebec and contributed to the Liberal Party's loss in the 1911 election. Bourassa's moves ironically aided the election of the Conservative Party, which held more staunchly pro-imperialist policies than the Liberals.

In 1910, while he was serving in the Provincial Assembly as the member for Saint-Hyacinthe, he founded the newspaper Le Devoir (English: Duty) to promote the Nationalist League and served as its editor until 1932. Bourassa's main objective was to position Le Devoir outside the control of the established parties in Quebec and in Ottawa, which had authority over press organs devoted to their electoral interests and attempted to control public opinion by their partisan actions. Bourassa chose the name Le Devoir for his newspaper because of its emphasis of his commitment to integrity and justice and his desire to serve the public good.

In 1913, Bourassa denounced the government of Ontario as "more Prussian than Prussia" during the Ontario Schools Question crisis (see Regulation 17) after Ontario had almost banned the use of French in its schools and made English its official language of instruction. He charged his compatriots to see their enemies inside Canada, in 1915:

"The enemies of the French language, of French civilization in Canada, are not the Boches on the shores of the Spree; but the English-Canadian anglicizers, the Orange intriguers, or Irish priests. Above all they are French Canadians weakened and degraded by the conquest and three centuries of colonial servitude. Let no mistake be made: if we let the Ontario minority be crushed, it will soon be the turn of other French groups in English Canada." [in Wade, v 2 p. 671]

== First World War ==
When war broke out in 1914, Bourassa wrote in Le Devoir on September 8 that Canada should take part, reluctantly, as a nation and within the limits of its means. He soon resumed his criticism, holding both sides responsible for the war, questioning Britain's financial motives and attacking the zeal of the Canadian government. His opponents twice prevented him from delivering an address on the subject, which he published in 1915 as The Duty of Canada at the Present Hour. By then his articles, his speeches and his book Que devons-nous à l'Angleterre? (1915) had made him a target in English Canada, where there were calls to close Le Devoir and to arrest him. A hostile crowd in Ottawa threw vegetables and eggs at him during one of his speeches.

When Prime Minister Robert Borden proposed conscription in May 1917, Bourassa called for resistance by constitutional means and supported Laurier's proposal to put the question to a referendum. He rejected the Union government formed that autumn and backed Laurier in the federal election of December 17, 1917, in which they carried Quebec but were badly beaten in English Canada. Once the Military Service Act was law, he denounced conscription as a "blood tax" but urged that the law be obeyed and the exemption tribunals used.

== Return to the House of Commons ==
Bourassa returned to federal politics in the 1925 election, winning Labelle as an independent on October 29, 1925. He was re-elected in 1926 and returned by acclamation in 1930. In the House he opposed old-age pensions and spoke on budgets, French-language rights, the natural resources of the western provinces and divorce law, and came to be regarded as its "conscience". He stepped down as director of Le Devoir on August 2, 1932, after the Depression had brought the paper close to bankruptcy and his address "Honnêtes ou canailles?" of March 4, 1932, had cost it many subscribers. In the 1935 election he was defeated in Labelle by the Liberal Maurice Lalonde, by a majority of 1,869 votes.

== Second World War ==
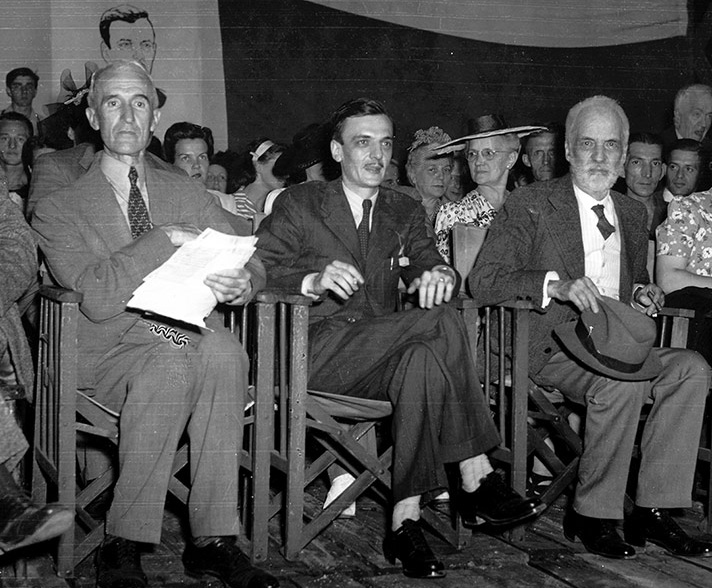
Maxime Raymond, André Laurendeau and Henri Bourassa (right) in 1944

During the Second World War, Bourassa opposed the plebiscite of April 27, 1942, which asked voters to release the government of William Lyon Mackenzie King from its promise not to impose conscription for overseas service. He did not join the Ligue pour la défense du Canada, founded in February 1942, or the Bloc populaire canadien, founded that September, but he supported their aims and took part in many of their political and election meetings until 1944. In the autumn of 1944 he suffered a heart attack; he recovered but remained frail for the rest of his life.

== Views on Jews ==
Bourassa was one of several Canadians of his generation influenced by the anti-Jewish writings of Goldwin Smith. On March 15, 1906, the House of Commons debated a resolution moved by Angus Claude Macdonell, the Conservative member for Toronto South, deploring the massacres of Jews in Russia. Bourassa rose to dispel what he called "the fictitious sentiment which has been sought to be developed in this country in favour of the Jews". He told the House that Jews had been "at the bottom of most of the social troubles that have arisen in Russia", that money raised abroad for their relief had bought arms for revolutionaries, and that "the Russian peasants had been sucked for centuries by the Jewish usurers". Citing Smith, he attributed hostility toward Jews not to racial or religious feeling but to their supposed refusal to assimilate. He prefaced these remarks by saying that he bore no ill will toward Jews and by recalling that Lower Canada had granted Jews civil rights before Britain did, under a law he attributed to his grandfather Louis-Joseph Papineau. Historian Pierre Anctil writes that in this speech Bourassa strongly opposed the arrival of Russian Jews in Canada, and that it haunted him for years afterward. Abella described a speech in which Bourassa, "borrowing heavily from Smith", urged that Canada close its doors to Jewish immigrants as the most explicitly anti-Jewish speech in the history of the House of Commons.

Bourassa returned to the subject that June, when the Commons debated the exemptions in the federal Lord's Day Act. On June 20, 1906, while saying he was willing to protect Jews from being made to work on Saturday, he objected to a clause that would allow those who kept Saturday as their day of rest to work on Sunday. He called Jews "the most undesirable class of people any country can have", said that they respected Canada's criminal laws "but that is all", and described them as "vampires on the community instead of being contributors to the general welfare". He again invoked Smith, and accused the government of burdening the consciences of two million Catholics while carving out an exemption "to get the votes of a few Jews in Toronto and Montreal". A week later, after meeting representatives of the Jewish community, he moved his own amendment, which he told the House they had accepted: it protected from prosecution anyone who, for reasons of conscience, kept another day of rest and allowed no work or trade on their premises on that day. The amendment was defeated by a majority of 46, but Montreal's Jewish Times credited him with having partly redeemed his earlier remarks.

Jewish questions held a relatively minor place in Le Devoir while Bourassa directed it. According to Anctil, the paper's attention to them grew as Bourassa's influence over it declined, and his successors Georges Pelletier and Omer Héroux were more inclined to write on the subject, in terms drawn largely from French antisemitism, notably the idea that Jewish immigrants could not be assimilated.

Historian Ira Robinson writes that Bourassa abandoned his anti-Jewish rhetoric in the late 1920s. In 1930 he supported the principle of a separate system of Jewish schools in Montreal, and in the 1930s he called antisemitism an "absurd monstrosity" in the House of Commons. In a 1934 letter he condemned "stupid and coarse attacks" on Jews, and in three lectures on nationalism given in Montreal in April and May 1935 he denounced the antisemitism then widespread in Quebec and elsewhere. After visiting Europe in 1936 and 1938, he had no sympathy for Nazism, which he saw as exalting "the worship of race" and hatred of Jews. Robinson notes, however, that Bourassa continued to distinguish between Jews he considered respectable and those he did not, and to believe in the "international tendencies" of the Jewish people and in their influence over finance and the press.

== Death and legacy ==
Upon his death in Outremont, Quebec in 1952 (one day shy of his 84th birthday), Henri Bourassa was interred in Montreal's Cimetière Notre-Dame-des-Neiges.

Henri Bourassa Boulevard, Henri-Bourassa metro station, and the federal riding of Bourassa, all in Montreal, are named for him. It is also the case for Henri-Bourassa Street, Henri-Bourassa park and the Regional County Municipality (RCM) of Papineau building, all of which are located in Papineauville, Québec. He is not related to Robert Bourassa, the former premier of Quebec; or Lucien Bourassa the former mayor of Shawinigan.

Bourassa's political thought, according to Michael C. Macmillan, was largely a combination of Whig liberalism, Catholic social thought, and traditional Quebec political thought. He was distinctly liberal in his anti-imperialism and general support for civil liberties for French Canadians, and his approach to economic questions was essentially Catholic. While Bourassa embraced the ultramontane idea that the Church was responsible for faith, morals, discipline, and administration, he resisted Church involvement in the political sphere and rejected the corporatism espoused by the Church. Bourassa opposed state intervention wherever possible and increasingly throughout his career emphasized the need for moral reform.

According Levitt has shown, attitudes of historians, both Anglophone and Francophone, toward Bourassa consistently have been coloured by the position of each historian on the major issues Bourassa addressed. Goldwin Smith, a fellow anti-imperialist, introduced him into historical literature in 1902. The isolationism of the 1930s and the biculturalism of the 1960s (Bourassa, while a champion of Francophone rights, always opposed separatism) occasioned favourable treatment among Anglophones, while Lionel Groulx, his onetime foe, described him as "l'incomparable Éveilleur". Bourassa's position on social issues (Catholic, moderately reformist, emphasizing the family and agricultural values) likewise has called forth praise and blame.

== In popular culture ==
Bourassa appears in "The Trial of Terrence Meyers" (February 10, 2020), episode 15 of season 13 of the Canadian television period drama Murdoch Mysteries. Bourassa is played by Canadian actor Christian Martel.

== Works ==
(This list is incomplete)

- Le projet de Loi Navale. Sa nature ses conséquences. (Speech given at the Monument National on January 20, 1910).
- Pour la justice. La législation scolaire au Nord Ouest. Les discours de MM. Monk et Pelletier. Quelques objections. L'esprit de la Confédération.
- L'Emprunt de la Victoire la surenchère du bluff.
- Que Devons-Nous À L'Angleterre? La Défense Nationale. La Révolution Impérialiste. Le Tribut À L'Empire.
- L'intervention américaine ses motifs son objet ses conséquences.
- Le pape arbitre de la paix (1918)
- La Langue Gardienne de la Foi.
- La Propriété, Ses Bornes, Ses Abus. (Conference at the Semaine Sociale De Sherbrooke, August 11, 1924)
- Henri Bourassa; Biographie, Index Des Écrits, Index de la Correspondance Publique 1895–1924.

== Bibliography ==
- Samuel Leduc-Frenette, Les pèlerinages du Devoir en Acadie (1924 et 1927): un voyage intéressé et curieux pour les Canadiens français, Thesis, Concordia University, 2016, 78 p.
- Réal Bélanger, Henri Bourassa. Le fascinant destin d'un homme libre. (1868–1914), Québec, Presses de l'Université Laval, 2013, 570 p.
- Mario Cardinal, Pourquoi j'ai fondé Le Devoir. Henri Bourassa et son temps, Libre Expression, Montréal, 2010, 396 p. (ISBN 978-2-7648-0480-3)
- Pierre Anctil, Fais ce que dois. 60 éditoriaux pour comprendre Le Devoir sous Henri Bourassa (1910–1932), Québec, Éditions du Septentrion, 2010, 383 p. (ISBN 978-2-89448-617-7)
- Yvan Lamonde, Histoire sociale des idées au Québec (1896–1929), Montréal, Éditions Fides, 2000, 895p.
- Yvan Lamonde, Histoire sociale des idées au Québec, vol. II (1896–1929), Montréal, Éditions Fides, 2004, 328 p.
- Robert Comeau et Luc Desrochers (dir.), Le Devoir. Un journal indépendant (1910–1995), Sainte-Foy, Presses de l'Université du Québec, 1996, 368 p.
- Robert Lahaise (dir.), Le Devoir. Reflet du Québec au 20^{e} siècle, Montréal, Hurtubise, 1994, 504 p.
- Pierre Anctil, Le Devoir, les Juifs et l'immigration. De Bourassa à Laurendeau, Québec, Institut québécois de recherche sur la culture, 1988, 172 p.
- David Rome, The Jewish Biography of Henri Bourassa, Montréal, National Archives, Canadian Jewish Congress, 1988, 2 volumes.
- François-Albert Angers et Aurélien Boisvert, L’égarement du «Devoir», Montréal, Éditions du Franc-Canada, 1986, 105 p.
- Auldham Roy Petrie, Henri Bourassa, Don Mills, Ont., Fitzhenry & Whiteside, cop., 1980, 63 p.
- Joseph Levitt, Henri Bourassa, Catholic Critic, Ottawa, [Canadian Historical Association], 1976, 24 p.
- Joseph Levitt (ed.), Henri Bourassa on Imperialism and Biculturalism, 1900–1918, Toronto, Copp. Clark Pub Co., 1970, 183 p.
- Joseph Levitt, Henri Bourassa and the Golden Calf. The Social Program of the Nationalists of Quebec, 1900–1914, Ottawa, Éditions de l'Université d'Ottawa, 1969, 178 p.
- Casey Murrow, Henri Bourassa and French-Canadian Nationalism. Opposition to Empire, Montréal, Harvest House, 1968, 143 p.
- André Bergevin, Cameron Nish, Anne Bourassa, Henri Bourassa. Biographie, index des écrits, index de la correspondance publique, 1895–1924, Montréal, Éditions de l'Action nationale, 1966, 150 p.
- Martin Patrick O'Connell, Henri Bourassa and Canadian Nationalism, thesis, University of Toronto, 1954, 304 p.
- Rumilly, Robert. Henri Bourassa – La Vie Publique D'un Grand Canadien (1944), also published as Histoire De La Province De Quebec: XIII: Henri Bourassa.
- Hommage à Henri Bourassa. Reproduit du numéro souvenir paru dans Le Devoir du 25 octobre 1952, Montréal, Le Devoir, 1952, 216 p.; 2nd edition, 1953, 305 p.

== Articles and chapters ==
- Lucien Bouchard: Henri Bourassa, en Bâtisseurs d'Amérique: Des canadiens français qui ont faite de l'histoire. Dir. André Pratte, Jonathan Kay. La Presse, Montréal 2016
- Legacy. How french Canadians shaped North America. McClelland & Stewart, Toronto 2016; 2019 (ISBN 0-7710-7239-2)
- Geoff Keelan, « Catholic Neutrality: The Peace of Henri Bourassa », Journal of the Canadian Historical Association, vol. 22, no. 1, 2011, p. 99-132
- Réal Bélanger, « BOURASSA, HENRI », in Dictionnaire biographique du Canada, vol. 18, Université Laval/University of Toronto, 2009.
- Rolando Gomes, « Henri Bourassa et l’impérialisme britannique (1899–1918), in Bulletin d’histoire politique, volume 16, numéro 3, printemps 2008, p. 161-182.
- Joseph Levitt, « Henri Bourassa », in L'Encyclopédie canadienne, 2008.
- Béatrice Richard, « Henri Bourassa et la conscription : traitre ou sauveur ? », in Revue militaire canadienne/Canadian Military Journal, volume 7, no. 4 (hiver), 2006–2007, p. 75-83.
- Gilles Gallichan, « La carrière parlementaire d'Henri Bourassa à Québec », in Revue parlementaire canadienne, automne 1996.
- « Bourassa, Henri », in Dictionnaire des auteurs de langue française en Amérique du Nord, 1989.
- René Durocher, « Henri Bourassa, les évêques et la guerre de 1914–1918 », Historical Papers / Communications historiques, vol. 6, n^{o} 1, 1971, p. 248-275.
- Susan Mann Robertson, « Variations on a Nationalist Theme: Henri Bourassa and Abbé Groulx in the 1920s », Historical Papers / Communications historiques, vol. 5, n^{o} 1, 1970, p. 109-119.
- Joseph Levitt, « La perspective nationaliste d'Henri Bourassa, 1896–1914 », Revue d'histoire de l'Amérique française, vol. 22, n^{o} 4, 1969, p. 567-582.
- Richard Jones « La perspective nationaliste d'Henri Bourassa, 1896–1914 : commentaire », Revue d'histoire de l'Amérique française, vol. 22, n^{o} 4, 1969, p. 582-586.
- Pierre-R. Desrosiers, «Le Castor rouge. La genèse et le développement de la pensée politique et sociale d'Henri Bourassa», in Parti pris, vol. 4, nos. 9–12 (mai-août), 1967, p. 146-164.
- James I. W. Corcoran, « Henri Bourassa et la guerre sud-africaine (part 4) », Revue d'histoire de l'Amérique française, vol. 19, n^{o} 3, 1965, p. 414-442.
- James I. W. Corcoran, « Henri Bourassa et la guerre sud-africaine (part 3) », Revue d'histoire de l'Amérique française, vol. 19, n^{o} 2, 1965, p. 229-237
- James I. W. Corcoran, « Henri Bourassa et la guerre sud-africaine (part 2) », Revue d'histoire de l'Amérique française, vol. 19, n^{o} 1, 1965, p. 84-105.
- James I. W. Corcoran, « Henri Bourassa et la guerre sud-africaine (part 1) », Revue d'histoire de l'Amérique française, vol. 18, n^{o} 3, 1964, p. 343-356.
- « Un document historique: toute la pensée de Bourassa sur le séparatisme », in L'Action nationale, vol. 53, no. 9, mai 1964.
- André Laurendeau (dir.), «Henri Bourassa», in L'Action nationale, vol. 43, no.1, janvier 1954
- Marine Leland, « Quelques observations sur le nationalisme de Henri Bourassa », Report of the Annual Meeting of the Canadian Historical Association / Rapports annuels de la Société historique du Canada, vol. 30, n^{o} 1, 1951, p. 60-63.
- « Henri Bourassa » in Biographies canadiennes-françaises. 3^{e} édition, Ottawa, 1923, p. 140.
- « Henri Bourassa » in Biographies canadiennes-françaises. 2^{e} édition, Ottawa, 1922, p. 227.

== Other works ==
- « Avant le combat, Henri Bourassa », Résonances, Savoir média
- Christian Blais and al., Le Devoir, témoin de la vie politique québécoise. Une exposition sur les 100 ans du Devoir à découvrir à la Bibliothèque de l'Assemblée nationale, du 17 février au 1^{er} octobre 2010, Québec, Bibliothèque de l'Assemblée nationale, 2010, 36 p.
- « La conscription, Henri Bourassa », Résonances, Savoir média
- Paul Racine, Henri Bourassa à Notre-Dame, Montréal, Éditions de l'Entr'aide, 1941?, 52 p.
- « Le péril de l'immigration, Henri Bourassa », Résonances, Savoir média
- Pierre Colmet, M. Bourassa et la Judéo-Maçonnerie, Paris, Revue internationale des Sociétés secrètes, 1924, p. 909-915.
- E. Roux, M. Henri Bourassa au service de l'Allemagne, Montréal, Imprimerie Perrault, 1917?, 58 p.
- Joseph-Arthur D'Amours, Où allons-nous? Le nationalisme canadien. Lettres de «Un Patriote» publiées dans le journal La Presse, augmentées d'une introduction, d'additions et d'appendices documentaires, Montréal, Société d'éditions patriotiques, 1916, 73 p.
- Canadian Nationalism and the War, Montréal, [s.n.], 1916, 31 p.
- LaChapelle, Guy and Comeau, Robert, ed. Robert Bourasa: Un Bâtisseur Tranquille Pr. de l'U. Laval, 2003. 406 p.
- Levitt, Joseph. "Images of Bourassa" Journal of Canadian Studies 1978 13(1): 100–113. ISSN 0021-9495
- MacMillan, C. Michael. "Henri Bourassa on the Defence of Language Rights" Dalhousie Review 1982a 62(3): 413–430. ISSN 0011-5827
- MacMillan, C. Michael. "The Character of Henri Bourassa's Political Philosophy" American Review of Canadian Studies 1982b 12(1): 10–29. ISSN 0272-2011
- Mason Wade, The French Canadians, 1760–1945 (1955).
- Alfred George Gardiner, Henri Bourassa and the Future of Canada, Montréal, Le Devoir Printing, 1914, 7 p.

== See also ==
- Politics of Quebec
- Conscription Crisis of 1917
- Conscription Crisis of 1944
- National Assembly of Quebec
- List of third party leaders (Quebec)
- History of Quebec
- Antisemitism in Canada

== Primary sources ==
- Henri Bourassa fonds at Library and Archives Canada. Archival reference number is R8069.
- Patrick Allen et al., eds. La pensée de Henri Bourassa (1954)
- Levitt, Joseph, ed. Henri Bourassa on Imperialism and Biculturalism, 1900–1918 (1970)
