= René Cousineau =

Canadian politician

Member of Parliament for Gatineau riding
- In office 1979–1984
- Preceded by: Gaston Clermont
- Succeeded by: Claudy Mailly

Personal details
- Born: 17 June 1930 Gatineau, Quebec
- Died: 10 September 2002 (aged 72)
- Party: Liberal
- Profession: Developer, notary lawyer, law teacher

René Cousineau (17 June 1930 – 10 September 2002) was a Liberal party member of the House of Commons of Canada. Cousineau was born in Gatineau, Quebec and became a developer. He also practiced and taught notary law.

He was elected at Gatineau riding in the 1979 federal election and re-elected in 1980. Cousineau was defeated by Claudy Mailly of the Progressive Conservative Party in the 1984 federal election.

== Electoral record ==
1980 Canadian federal election: Gatineau
Party	Candidate	Votes	%	±%
Liberal	René Cousineau	35,437	78.63	+6.74
New Democratic	Renée Pierre Brisson	4,792	10.63	+3.72
Progressive Conservative	Jean-Pierre Plouffe	3,134	6.95	+0.29
Social Credit	Marcelle Cormier	975	2.16	−10.87
Rhinoceros	François R. Penzes	640	1.42	–
Marxist–Leninist	Christine Dandenault	91	0.20	−0.03
Total valid votes		45,069	100.00	
Total rejected ballots		244		
Turnout		45,313	68.45	−6.35
Electors on the lists		66,195		
Source: Report of the Chief Electoral Officer, Thirty-second General Election, 1980.
lop.parl.ca

1979 Canadian federal election: Gatineau
Party	Candidate	Votes	%
Liberal	René Cousineau	34,234	71.89
Social Credit	Gérard Croteau	6,206	13.03
New Democratic	André Beaudry	3,292	6.91
Progressive Conservative	René Bergeron	3,174	6.66
Union populaire	André Côté	608	1.28
Marxist–Leninist	Christine Dandenault	108	0.23
Total valid votes		47,622	100.00
Total rejected ballots		340	
Turnout		47,962	74.80
Electors on the lists		64,124	
Source: Report of the Chief Electoral Officer, Thirty-first General Election, 1979.
