= Françoise Boivin =

Canadian politician

Françoise Boivin LLB
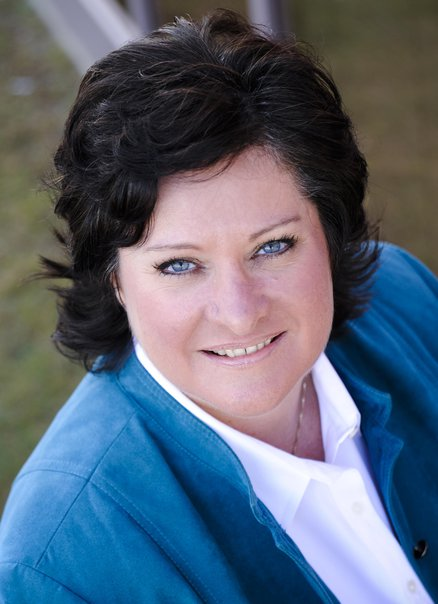

Member of Parliament for Gatineau
- In office May 2, 2011 – October 15, 2015
- Preceded by: Richard Nadeau
- Succeeded by: Steve MacKinnon
- In office June 28, 2004 – January 23, 2006
- Preceded by: Mark Assad
- Succeeded by: Richard Nadeau

Personal details
- Born: June 11, 1960 (age 66) Hull, Quebec
- Party: New Democratic (2008–present)
- Other political affiliations: Liberal (2004–2008)
- Profession: Lawyer

Françoise Boivin (born June 11, 1960 in Hull, Quebec) is a Canadian politician, who represented the electoral district of Gatineau in the House of Commons of Canada until 2015.

She first represented the district from 2004 to 2006 as a member of the Liberal Party, but was defeated in the 2006 election by Richard Nadeau of the Bloc Québécois. She subsequently left the Liberals and ran to reclaim her seat in the 2008 election as a New Democratic Party candidate, but was narrowly defeated by Nadeau. She was re-elected to Parliament as a New Democrat in the 2011 election. She was defeated in 2015.

== Studies, early career and community involvement ==
Françoise Boivin has degrees in social sciences and civil law from the University of Ottawa.

Boivin has been a member of the Quebec Bar since 1984. She began her legal career with Beaudry, Bertrand and subsequently co-founded the law firm Letellier & Associés. During this time, she also taught, and was in charge of the negotiation sector, at the Quebec Bar training school.

In September 1998, Boivin hosted a public affairs program on CJRC. She was subsequently asked to host a number of other programs for CJRC-1150 and for Canal Vox. During the times of increasing price of gas, she asked her radio listeners to boycott Petro-Canada to push the country's national fuel company to decrease its prices.

In 2000, she set up her own firm where she works mainly in the area of labour law.

Boivin has participated in many fundraising activities to help agencies such as the Canadian Cancer Society, the Outaouais Alzheimer's Society, and the Foundation for Heart Disease (Outaouais). She has also worked closely with various support and network agencies helping women and seniors.

== Liberal politician ==
In 2004, Boivin, a longtime Liberal supporter, won her party's nomination for Gatineau. She defeated Bloc candidate Richard Nadeau by only two percentage points, an unusually close margin for what has historically been a strongly federalist riding. She made a breakthrough in politics as newly elected Liberal Member of Parliament (MP) by being one of the first to openly oppose the US missile defence system, a point of view that ultimately became the official position of Prime Minister Paul Martin.

Françoise Boivin was also chosen to be the official seconder to the 2004 Speech from the Throne in October of that year. She was a member of the Committee on Bill C-38 to provide legal recognition of same-sex marriage, which she supported. In Parliament, she was a member of the Subcommittee on Parliamentary Privilege and the Liberal Committee on Cities and Communities. She was also part of the Standing Committee on Official Languages and the Standing Committee on Finance.

She was named "Rookie of the Year" by Susan Delacourt of the Toronto Star, and was one of the rare MPs to have never missed a vote in the House of Commons. As a member of the Standing Committee on Procedure and House Affairs which studied the topic of Electoral Reform, on May 17, 2005, when Ed Broadbent proposed a detailed resolution that the government launch a process of electoral reform, she immediately stated that she fully concurred with his resolution, which formed the basis for the Committee's Report the next month. She also served as chair of the Liberal Women's Caucus.

Boivin was narrowly defeated by Nadeau in the January 23, 2006 federal election. She remained active within the Liberal Party, backing Michael Ignatieff during the 2006 Liberal Party leadership campaign and as media specialist for the Liberal Women's Commission (Quebec).

== Move to the NDP ==
On February 25, 2008, Boivin announced that she would seek to regain her old seat, this time as the candidate of the NDP. She opted to leave the Liberals after learning they planned to have a "star candidate" parachute into the riding. However, she said that her views were more aligned with those of the NDP than the Liberals. She had been a prominent member of the Liberals' left wing, and voted against stated Liberal policy five or six times during her initial stint in Parliament. She was formally welcomed to the party on June 17 at a press conference that included NDP leader Jack Layton and deputy leader/Quebec lieutenant Thomas Mulcair.

As an indication of her popularity, Boivin came in a very close second during the 40th Canadian Election in October 2008, beating the Liberal and distant Conservative candidates and challenging incumbent Nadeau very late into election night for the final result. At 29.1%, Nadeau received the lowest share of the popular vote of any candidate elected in that election.

== Between elections ==
Boivin practiced labour law at her own law firm and was strongly involved in Outaouais community activities and associations. She was an advisory member of the committee for the President of the Women's Business Network (RÉFAP) and a guest speaker at the Public Service Commission Management School. She appeared weekly on television as host of La Vérité choc with Roger Blanchette and Le Témoin est à vous on Canal Vox, and as a news commentator on the Denis Lévesque broadcast on LCN and TVA.

At its November 2008 convention, Boivin was elected president of the Quebec Section of the federal NDP, a position she occupied until November 2010.

== 2011 election ==
Boivin once again ran as the NDP candidate in her old riding of Gatineau during the 41st Canadian election. In the May 2, 2011 election, she won with 61.8% of the vote as part of the massive NDP tsunami that swept across Quebec, finishing 26,643 votes ahead of Nadeau.

== 41st Parliament ==
On May 26, 2011 Layton named Boivin critic for the Status of Women. On September 20, 2011, interim Opposition Leader Nycole Turmel also named her Deputy Critic for Justice. Boivin also co-chaired the Standing Joint Committee on Scrutiny of Regulations with Conservative Senator Bob Runciman. In April 2012, newly elected NDP leader Mulcair named her Critic for Justice.

== 2015 election ==
Boivin lost to Liberal Steven MacKinnon in the October 19, 2015 election.

== Electoral record ==
2015 Canadian federal election
Party	Candidate	Votes	%	±%	Expenditures
Liberal	Steve MacKinnon	31,076	53.76	+39.96	–
New Democratic	Françoise Boivin	15,352	26.56	-35.57	–
Bloc Québécois	Philippe Boily	5,455	9.44	-5.49	$36,985.75
Conservative	Luc Angers	4,733	8.19	+0.18	–
Green	Guy Dostaler	942	1.63	+0.49	$639.67
Independent	Guy J. Bellavance	148	0.26	–	–
Marxist–Leninist	Pierre Soublière	94	0.16	–	–
Total valid votes/Expense limit		57,800	100.0		$221,304.70
Total rejected ballots		522	–	–	
Turnout		58,322	–	–	
Eligible voters		83,651			
Source: Elections Canada

2011 Canadian federal election
Party	Candidate	Votes	%	±%	Expenditures
New Democratic	Françoise Boivin	35,262	61.8%	–	
Bloc Québécois	Richard Nadeau	8,619	15.1%	–	
Liberal	Steve MacKinnon	7,975	14%	–	
Conservative	Jennifer Gearey	4,532	7.9%	–	
Green	Jonathan Meijer	639	1.1%	–	
Total valid votes/Expense limit		–	100.00%		

Source: Elections Canada

2008 Canadian federal election
Party	Candidate	Votes	%	±%
Bloc Québécois	Richard Nadeau	15,050	29.13%	-10.11%
New Democratic	Françoise Boivin	13,467	26.07%	+16.11%
Liberal	Michel Simard	13,111	25.38%	-5.92%
Conservative	Denis Tassé	8,700	16.84%	+0.07%
Green	David Inglis	1,334	2.58%	-0.12%
Total valid votes		51,462	100.00%	
Total rejected ballots		–		
Turnout		–	%	
Bloc Québécois hold		Swing		-13.11%

2006 Canadian federal election
Party	Candidate	Votes	%	±%
Bloc Québécois	Richard Nadeau	21,093	39.25%	-1.02%
Liberal	Françoise Boivin	16,826	31.31%	-10.78%
Conservative	Patrick Robert	9,014	16.77%	+9.19%
New Democratic	Anne Levesque	5,354	9.96%	+4.24%
Green	Gail Walker	1,456	2.71%	-0.36%
Total valid votes		53,743	100.00	

2004 Canadian federal election: Gatineau
Party	Candidate	Votes	%	±%	Expenditures
Liberal	Françoise Boivin	19,198	42.09	–	$46,713
Bloc Québécois	Richard Nadeau	18,368	40.27		$19,466
Conservative	Gérald Nicolas	3,461	7.59		not listed
New Democratic	Dominique Vaillancourt	2,610	5.72		none listed
Green	Brian Gibb	1,402	3.07		$144
Marijuana	Stephane Salko	453	0.99		none listed
Marxist–Leninist	Gabriel Girard-Bernier	125	0.27		none listed
Total valid votes/expenditure limit		45,617	100.00	–	$80,437
Total rejected ballots		602			
Turnout		46,219	56.61		
Electors on the lists		81,644			
Percentage change figures are factored for redistribution. Conservative Party percentages are contrasted with the combined Canadian Alliance and Progressive Conservative percentages from 2000.
Sources: Official Results, Elections Canada and Financial Returns, Elections Canada.
