= Charles Beautron Major =

Canadian politician

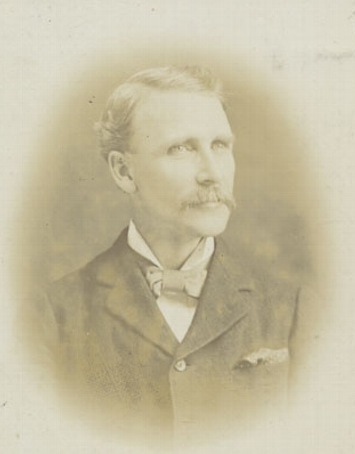

Member of the Canadian Parliament for Labelle
- In office 1907–1911
- Preceded by: Henri Bourassa
- Succeeded by: Honoré Achim

Member of the Legislative Assembly of Quebec for Ottawa
- In office 1897–1904
- Preceded by: Nérée Tétreau
- Succeeded by: Ferdinand-Ambroise Gendron

Personal details
- Born: March 18, 1851 Sainte-Scholastique (Mirabel), Canada East
- Died: May 15, 1924 (aged 73) Papineauville, Quebec
- Party: Liberal Party of Canada

Charles Beautron Major (March 18, 1851 – May 15, 1924) was a lawyer, judge and political figure in Quebec. He represented Ottawa electoral district in the Legislative Assembly of Quebec from 1897 to 1904 and Labelle in the House of Commons of Canada from 1907 to 1911 as a Liberal.

He was born in Sainte-Scholastique, Canada East, the son of Joseph Beautron dit Major and Elmire Biroleau. His father was a leader in the Lower Canada Rebellion. In 1876, Major married Cymodocie Trudel,. He was admitted to the Quebec bar in 1877 and set up practice in Montreal with Raymond Préfontaine. He later moved to Papineauville and then to Hull, where he practised with Hyacinthe-Adélard Fortier, who became his son-in-law in 1901. Major was a promoter and later director of the Northern Colonization Railway. He served as mayor of Papineauville and was warden for Ottawa County in 1891 and 1892. He was first elected to the House of Commons in a 1917 by-election held after Henri Bourassa resigned his seat. Major was defeated when he ran for reelection to the House of Commons in 1911. In 1913, he was named judge for Montcalm, Pontiac, Ottawa and Terrebonne districts. Major died in Papineauville at the age of 73.
