= Labelle (federal electoral district) =

Former federal electoral district in Quebec, Canada

Quebec electoral district

Defunct federal electoral district
- Legislature: House of Commons
- District created: 1892
- District abolished: 1987
- First contested: 1896
- Last contested: 1984

Labelle (French pronunciation: [labɛl]) was a federal electoral district in Quebec, Canada, that was represented in the House of Commons of Canada from 1896 to 1988.

This riding was created in 1892 from parts of the County of Ottawa riding.

The electoral district was abolished in 1987 when it was redistributed into the new riding of Laurentides and the existing riding of Pontiac—Gatineau—Labelle.

The district's most prominent MP was Quebec nationalist Henri Bourassa.

== Members of Parliament ==
This riding elected the following members of Parliament:

Parliament	Years	Member	Party
Labelle; Riding created from County of Ottawa
8th	1896–1899	Henri Bourassa	Liberal
8th	1900–1900	Henri Bourassa	Independent
9th	1900–1904	Henri Bourassa	Liberal
10th	1904–1907	Henri Bourassa	Liberal
10th	1907–1908	Charles Beautron Major	Liberal
11th	1908–1911	Charles Beautron Major	Liberal
12th	1911–1917	Honoré Achim	Conservative
13th	1917–1921	Hyacinthe-Adélard Fortier	Opposition (Laurier Liberals)
14th	1921–1925	Hyacinthe-Adélard Fortier	Liberal
15th	1925–1926	Henri Bourassa	Independent
16th	1926–1930	Henri Bourassa	Independent
17th	1930–1935	Henri Bourassa	Independent
18th	1935–1940	Maurice Lalonde	Liberal
19th	1940–1945	Maurice Lalonde	Liberal
20th	1945–1949	Maurice Lalonde	Liberal
21st	1949–1953	Henri Courtemanche	Progressive Conservative
22nd	1953–1957	Gustave Roy	Liberal
23rd	1957–1958	Henri Courtemanche	Independent Progressive Conservative
24th	1958–1960	Henri Courtemanche	Progressive Conservative
25th	1960–1962	Gaston Clermont	Liberal
26th	1962–1963	Gaston Clermont	Liberal
27th	1963–1964	Gérard Girouard	Social Credit
27th	1964–1965	Gérard Girouard	Progressive Conservative
28th	1965–1968	Gaston Clermont	Liberal
29th	1968–1970	Léo Cadieux	Liberal
29th	1970–1972	Maurice Dupras	Liberal
30th	1972–1974	Maurice Dupras	Liberal
31st	1974–1979	Maurice Dupras	Liberal
32nd	1979–1980	Maurice Dupras	Liberal
33rd	1980–1984	Maurice Dupras	Liberal
34th	1984–1988	Fernand Ladouceur	Progressive Conservative
Riding dissolved into Laurentides and Pontiac—Gatineau—Labelle

== Election results ==
1896 Canadian federal election
Party	Candidate	Votes
Liberal	Henri Bourassa	2,175
Conservative	S.R. Poulin	1,706

By-election on 18 January 1900 Bourassa's resignation, 26 October 1899, as a protest against Canadian participation in the South African War
Party	Candidate	Votes
Independent	Henri Bourassa	acclaimed

1900 Canadian federal election
Party	Candidate	Votes
Liberal	Henri Bourassa	1,973
Conservative	S.R. Poulin	1,494

1904 Canadian federal election
Party	Candidate	Votes
Liberal	Henri Bourassa	2,640
Conservative	G. Alphonse Dugal	1,147
Independent	Angus D. Cameron	399

By-election on 23 December 1907 Bourassa's resignation, 29 October 1907, to enter provincial politics
Party	Candidate	Votes
Liberal	Charles Beautron Major	acclaimed

1908 Canadian federal election
Party	Candidate	Votes
Liberal	Charles Beautron Major	2,951
Conservative	Hector Chauvin	1,624

1911 Canadian federal election
Party	Candidate	Votes
Conservative	Honoré Achim	2,902
Liberal	Charles-Beautrom Major	2,818

1917 Canadian federal election
Party	Candidate	Votes
Opposition (Laurier Liberals)	Hyacinthe-Adélard Fortier	acclaimed

1921 Canadian federal election
Party	Candidate	Votes
Liberal	Hyacinthe-Adélard Fortier	7,391
Progressive	Jean Lachance	2,893
Independent	Marc-Azarie Ménard	124

1925 Canadian federal election
Party	Candidate	Votes
Independent	Henri Bourassa	5,843
Liberal	Henri Jodoin	3,764

1926 Canadian federal election
Party	Candidate	Votes
Independent	Henri Bourassa	7,569
Conservative	Louis Cousineau	1,118
Protectionist	Joseph-Édouard Moranville	129

1930 Canadian federal election
Party	Candidate	Votes
Independent	Henri Bourassa	acclaimed

1935 Canadian federal election
Party	Candidate	Votes
Liberal	Maurice Lalonde	7,280
Independent	Henri Bourassa	5,411

1940 Canadian federal election
Party	Candidate	Votes
Liberal	Maurice Lalonde	8,797
Independent	Lévis Lorrain	5,909

1945 Canadian federal election
Party	Candidate	Votes
Liberal	Maurice Lalonde	7,969
Independent	Joseph-Raymond-Edmond Doyon	5,769
Social Credit	Philippe Lacoste	1,228

1949 Canadian federal election
Party	Candidate	Votes
Progressive Conservative	Henri Courtemanche	8,701
Liberal	Ernest Whissell	7,998
Union des électeurs	Simon Yelle	1,289

1953 Canadian federal election
Party	Candidate	Votes
Liberal	Gustave Roy	9,569
Progressive Conservative	Henri Courtemanche	8,610
Labor–Progressive	Roméo Lafond	176
Co-operative Commonwealth	Robert Edward Senkler Morgan	90

1957 Canadian federal election
Party	Candidate	Votes
Independent PC	Henri Courtemanche	9,406
Liberal	Gustave Roy	8,045

1958 Canadian federal election
Party	Candidate	Votes
Progressive Conservative	Henri Courtemanche	10,606
Liberal	J.-Henri Forget	7,660

By-election on 31 October 1960 Courtemanche summoned to the Senate, 20 January 1960
Party	Candidate	Votes
Liberal	Gaston Clermont	9,540
Progressive Conservative	Paul-Émile Lesage	7,235

1962 Canadian federal election
Party	Candidate	Votes
Liberal	Gaston Clermont	6,218
Progressive Conservative	Paul-Émile Lesage	6,107
Social Credit	Guy Jean	4,813
New Democratic	Albert Maisonneuve	985

1963 Canadian federal election
Party	Candidate	Votes
Social Credit	Gérard Girouard	6,951
Liberal	Gaston Clermont	6,632
Progressive Conservative	Gérard Vermette	2,844
New Democratic	Roland Massé	905

1965 Canadian federal election
Party	Candidate	Votes
Liberal	Gaston Clermont	6,554
Ralliement créditiste	Gilles Caouette	3,697
Progressive Conservative	Gérard Vermette	3,354
New Democratic	Noël Décosse	1,989

1968 Canadian federal election
Party	Candidate	Votes
Liberal	Léo Cadieux	15,801
Progressive Conservative	Fernand Sarrazin	10,152
Ralliement créditiste	Clément Grondin	2,215
New Democratic	André Peclet	1,699

By-election on 16 November 1970 Cadieux's acceptance of an office of emolument under the Crown, 17 September 1970
Party	Candidate	Votes
Liberal	Maurice Dupras	12,604
Progressive Conservative	Paul Gélinas	4,870
Ralliement créditiste	André Ouellette	3,417

1972 Canadian federal election
Party	Candidate	Votes
Liberal	Maurice Dupras	15,807
Social Credit	Gérard Perron	12,247
Progressive Conservative	Paul Gélinas	6,439
New Democratic	Irène Trudel	1,645
Independent	Rolland Millette	371
Independent	Claude Demers	368

1974 Canadian federal election
Party	Candidate	Votes
Liberal	Maurice Dupras	16,224
Progressive Conservative	Marcel Masse	14,928
Social Credit	Wilfrid Marin	3,116
Social Credit	J. Noël Langlois	1,572
New Democratic	Irène Trudel	1,326
Communist	Claude Demers	227
Independent	Patricia Métivier	165

1979 Canadian federal election
Party	Candidate	Votes
Liberal	Maurice Dupras	29,614
Social Credit	Jean Léveillé	6,580
Progressive Conservative	Guy Racicot	6,073
New Democratic	Willie Kofman	2,134
Union populaire	Claude Lavoie	452
Marxist–Leninist	Paul Ménard	213

1980 Canadian federal election
Party	Candidate	Votes
Liberal	Maurice Dupras	29,488
Progressive Conservative	Marcel Masse	9,829
New Democratic	Willie Kofman	2,858
Rhinoceros	Gaston Collin	664
Rhinoceros	Jean-Marie Morin	580
Rhinoceros	Amouthd, Richard Gagnon	331
Union populaire	Solanges Charbonneau	227
Independent	Louise Poisson	227
Marxist–Leninist	Marc Blouin	108

1984 Canadian federal election
Party	Candidate	Votes
Progressive Conservative	Fernand Ladouceur	28,286
Liberal	Claude Hotte	14,465
New Democratic	Marc Péclet	4,670
Rhinoceros	Jacques Coco Miron	1,567
Parti nationaliste	Adrien Grégoire	1,546
Social Credit	Albert Pouliot	274
Commonwealth of Canada	Denis Tremblay	84

== See also ==
- List of Canadian electoral districts
- Historical federal electoral districts of Canada
