= Gatineau (federal electoral district) =

Federal electoral district in Quebec, Canada

Quebec electoral district
- Interactive map of riding boundaries from the 2025 federal election
- Coordinates: 45.500°N 75.677°W

Federal electoral district
- Legislature: House of Commons
MP
Steven MacKinnon
Liberal
- District created: 1947
- First contested: 1949
- Last contested: 2021
- District webpage: profile, map

Demographics
- Population (2016): 107,464
- Electors (2019): 84,463
- Area (km²): 125
- Pop. density (per km²): 859.7
- Census division: Gatineau
- Census subdivision: Gatineau (part)

Gatineau (French pronunciation: [ɡatino]) is a federal electoral district in Quebec, Canada, represented in the House of Commons of Canada from since 1949. Between 1987 and 1996, it was known as "Gatineau—La Lièvre".

It consists of part of the former city of Gatineau, Quebec as defined by its pre-2002 boundaries.

The adjacent ridings are Argenteuil—Papineau—Des Collines, Pontiac—Kitigan Zibi, Hull—Aylmer, Orléans, and Ottawa—Vanier—Gloucester.

== Demographics ==
According to the 2021 Canadian census

Ethnic groups: 81.8% White, 6.8% Black, 4.4% Indigenous, 3.4% Arab, 1.6% Latin American

Languages: 80.1% French, 6.7% English, 2.5% Arabic, 1.6% Spanish

Religions: 67.6% Christian (55.6% Catholic, 12.0% Other), 3.3% Muslim, 28.3% None

Median income: $45,600 (2020)

Average income: $51,550 (2020)

== History ==
The district was created in 1947 from parts of Hull and Wright ridings. In 1987, it was renamed to Chapleau, and then to Gatineau—La Lièvre in 1988. It was renamed back to "Gatineau" in 1996.

Gatineau lost territory to Pontiac during the 2012 electoral redistribution.

Following the 2022 Canadian federal electoral redistribution, it lost that part of the city of Gatineau north of Autoroute 50; and that part of the City of Gatineau east of Av. du Cheval-Blanc, and south of a line that follows Rivière Blanche to Highway 148 to Argenteuil—La Petite-Nation, and gained the remainder of the City of Gatineau west of Montée Paiement from Pontiac.

=== Members of Parliament ===
This riding has elected the following members of Parliament:

Parliament	Years	Member	Party
Gatineau; Riding created from Hull and Wright
20th	1945–1949	Léon Raymond	Liberal
21st	1949–1953	Joseph-Célestin Nadon	Liberal
22nd	1953–1957	Rodolphe Leduc	Liberal
23rd	1957–1958	Rodolphe Leduc	Liberal
24th	1958–1962	Rodolphe Leduc	Liberal
25th	1962–1963	Rodolphe Leduc	Liberal
26th	1963–1965	Rodolphe Leduc	Liberal
27th	1965–1968	Gaston Isabelle	Liberal
28th	1968–1972	Gaston Clermont	Liberal
29th	1972–1974	Gaston Clermont	Liberal
30th	1974–1979	Gaston Clermont	Liberal
31st	1979–1980	René Cousineau	Liberal
32nd	1980–1984	René Cousineau	Liberal
33rd	1984–1988	Claudy Mailly	Progressive Conservative
Gatineau—La Lièvre
34th	1988–1993	Mark Assad	Liberal
35th	1993–1997	Mark Assad	Liberal
Gatineau
36th	1997–2000	Mark Assad	Liberal
37th	2000–2004	Mark Assad	Liberal
38th	2004–2006	Françoise Boivin	Liberal
39th	2006–2008	Richard Nadeau	Bloc Québécois
40th	2008–2011	Richard Nadeau	Bloc Québécois
41st	2011–2015	Françoise Boivin	New Democratic
42nd	2015–2019	Steven MacKinnon	Liberal
43rd	2019–2021	Steven MacKinnon	Liberal
44th	2021–2025	Steven MacKinnon	Liberal
45th	2025–present	Steven MacKinnon	Liberal

Assad represented Gatineau—La Lièvre from 1988 to 1997 which was known as Chapleau from 1987 to 1988. This district had similar borders to Gatineau.

== Politics ==
Like most ridings in the Outaouais, Gatineau had long been safe for the Liberals, save for a lone Progressive Conservative victory in their 1984 nationwide landslide. Even as the rest of Quebec turned its back on the Liberals, a large number of civil servants who worked in Ottawa kept it in Liberal hands.

However, in the 2006 election the Bloc Québécois won the seat. The Bloc managed to hold the seat with just over 29% of the vote in 2008, by far the lowest percentage for a winning candidate nationwide, due to a near-three-way split between themselves, the New Democratic Party and the Liberals. The riding was swept up in the massive NDP wave that swept through the province in the 2011 election.

In the 2015 election, Liberal candidate Steven MacKinnon, running a second time, defeated NDP incumbent Françoise Boivin in an upset with an almost 40-point swing.

== Election results ==
=== 1997–present ===
Graph of election results in Gatineau (since 1997, minor parties that never got 2% of the vote or didn't run consistently are omitted)

2025 Canadian federal election
Party	Candidate	Votes	%	±%	Expenditures
Liberal	Steven MacKinnon	34,751	60.54	+10.49	$94,914.50
Conservative	Kethlande Pierre	10,982	19.13	+8.02	$20,982.21
Bloc Québécois	Richard Nadeau	9,373	16.33	–7.09	$31,981.46
New Democratic	Daniel Simoncic	1,615	2.81	–5.81	none listed
People's	Mathieu Saint-Jean	505	0.88	–3.17	$513.91
Marxist–Leninist	Pierre Soublière	173	0.30	+0.20	$0.00
Total valid votes/expense limit		57,399	98.91	–	$131,410.18
Total rejected ballots		633	1.09		
Turnout		58,032	68.20		
Eligible voters		85,086			
Liberal notional hold		Swing		+1.24	
Source: Elections Canada
Note: number of eligible voters does not include voting day registrations.

2021 federal election redistributed results
Party	Vote	%
Liberal	27,380	50.05
Bloc Québécois	12,810	23.42
Conservative	6,076	11.11
New Democratic	4,715	8.62
People's	2,218	4.05
Green	855	1.56
Others	646	1.18

2021 Canadian federal election
Party	Candidate	Votes	%	±%	Expenditures
Liberal	Steven MacKinnon	26,267	50.0	-2.1	$55,420.93
Bloc Québécois	Geneviève Nadeau	12,278	23.4	+2.0	$13,121.18
Conservative	Joel Bernard	5,752	11.0	+0.7	$3,144.49
New Democratic	Fernanda Rengel	4,508	8.6	-2.4	$51.11
People's	Mathieu Saint-Jean	2,264	4.3	+3.3	$4,401.73
Green	Rachid Jemmah	783	1.5	-2.6	$0.00
Free	Luc Lavoie	411	0.8	N/A	$564.48
Rhinoceros	Sébastien Grenier	178	0.3	N/A	$0.00
Marxist–Leninist	Pierre Soublière	56	0.1	±0.0	$0.00
Total valid votes/expense limit		52,497	98.5	–	$113,382.26
Total rejected ballots		818	1.5		
Turnout		53,315	63.8		
Registered voters		83,618			
Liberal hold		Swing		-2.0	
Source: Elections Canada

2019 Canadian federal election
Party	Candidate	Votes	%	±%	Expenditures
Liberal	Steven MacKinnon	29,084	52.1	-1.66	$67,009.65
Bloc Québécois	Geneviève Nadeau	11,926	21.4	+11.96	none listed
New Democratic	Eric Chaurette	6,128	11.0	-15.56	$24,553.38
Conservative	Sylvie Goneau	5,745	10.3	+2.11	$16,427.02
Green	Guy Dostaler	2,264	4.1	+2.47	$0.00
People's	Mario-Roberto Lam	560	1.0		$1,439.79
Marxist–Leninist	Pierre Soublière	76	0.1	-0.06	$0.00
Total valid votes/expense limit		55,783	100.0		
Total rejected ballots		787			
Turnout		56,570	67.0		
Eligible voters		84,463			
Liberal hold		Swing		-6.81	
Source: Elections Canada

2015 Canadian federal election
Party	Candidate	Votes	%	±%	Expenditures
Liberal	Steven MacKinnon	31,076	53.76	+39.96	$97,491.72
New Democratic	Françoise Boivin	15,352	26.56	-35.57	$52,920.78
Bloc Québécois	Philippe Boily	5,455	9.44	-5.49	$37,224.72
Conservative	Luc Angers	4,733	8.19	+0.18	$15,531.17
Green	Guy Dostaler	942	1.63	+0.49	$639.67
Independent	Guy J. Bellavance	148	0.26	–	$1,637.23
Marxist–Leninist	Pierre Soublière	94	0.16	–	–
Total valid votes/Expense limit		57,800	100.0		$221,893.30
Total rejected ballots		522	–	–	
Turnout		58,322	–	–	
Eligible voters		84,377			
Source: Elections Canada

2011 federal election redistributed results
Party	Vote	%
New Democratic	31,894	62.13
Bloc Québécois	7,663	14.93
Liberal	7,082	13.80
Conservative	4,111	8.01
Green	587	1.14

2011 Canadian federal election
Party	Candidate	Votes	%	±%	Expenditures
New Democratic	Françoise Boivin	35,262	61.83	+35.71	
Bloc Québécois	Richard Nadeau	8,619	15.11	-14.04	
Liberal	Steve MacKinnon	7,975	13.98	-11.34	
Conservative	Jennifer Gearey	4,532	7.95	-8.86	
Green	Jonathan Meijer	639	1.12	-1.45	
Total valid votes/Expense limit		57,027	100.00		
Total rejected ballots		365	0.64		
Turnout		57,392	64.10		
Eligible voters		89,537			

2008 Canadian federal election
Party	Candidate	Votes	%	±%	Expenditures
Bloc Québécois	Richard Nadeau	15,189	29.15	-10.11	$78,498
New Democratic	Françoise Boivin	13,612	26.12	+16.11	$87,035
Liberal	Michel Simard	13,193	25.32	-5.92	$40,288
Conservative	Denis Tassé	8,762	16.81	+0.07	$52,464
Green	David Inglis	1,342	2.57	-0.12	
Total valid votes/Expense limit		52,098	100.00	$88,989	
Bloc Québécois hold		Swing		-13.11	

2006 Canadian federal election
Party	Candidate	Votes	%	±%	Expenditures
Bloc Québécois	Richard Nadeau	21,093	39.25	-1.02	$72,093
Liberal	Françoise Boivin	16,826	31.31	-10.78	$70,768
Conservative	Patrick Robert	9,014	16.77	+9.19	$62,953
New Democratic	Anne Levesque	5,354	9.96	+4.24	$5,811
Green	Gail Walker	1,456	2.71	-0.36	$5
Total valid votes/Expense limit		53,743	100.00	$82,260	
Bloc Québécois gain		Swing			

2004 Canadian federal election
Party	Candidate	Votes	%	±%	Expenditures
Liberal	Françoise Boivin	19,198	42.09	-9.37	$46,494
Bloc Québécois	Richard Nadeau	18,368	40.27	14.87	$20,574
Conservative	Gérald Nicolas	3,461	7.59	-9.65	
New Democratic	Dominique Vaillancourt	2,610	5.72	+2.24	
Green	Brian Gibb	1,402	3.07		$144
Marijuana	Stéphane Salko	453	0.99	–	
Marxist–Leninist	Gabriel Girard-Bernier	125	0.27	0.00	
Total valid votes/Expense limit		45,617	100.00	$80,437	

Note: Conservative vote is compared to the total of the Canadian Alliance vote and Progressive Conservative vote in the 2000 election.

2000 Canadian federal election
Party	Candidate	Votes	%	±%
Liberal	Mark Assad	26,054	51.45	+5.04
Bloc Québécois	Richard Nadeau	12,857	25.39	+4.49
Alliance	Stéphany Crowley	5,084	10.04	
Progressive Conservative	Michael F. Vasseur	3,645	7.20	-21.77
New Democratic	Carl Hétu	1,765	3.49	+1.68
Natural Law	Jean-Claude Pommet	472	0.93	+0.11
Independent	Ronald Bélanger	392	0.77	
Independent	Samantha Demers	228	0.45	
Marxist–Leninist	Françoise Roy	139	0.27	0.00
Total valid votes		50,636	100.00	

1997 Canadian federal election
Party	Candidate	Votes	%
Liberal	Mark Assad	25,298	46.42
Progressive Conservative	Richard Côté	15,786	28.97
Bloc Québécois	Christian Picard	11,391	20.90
New Democratic	Michelle Bonner	982	1.80
Natural Law	Jean-Claude Pommet	448	0.82
Christian Heritage	Claude Grant	445	0.82
Marxist–Leninist	Françoise Roy	150	0.28
Total valid votes		54,500	100.00

=== Gatineau—La Lièvre (1988-1993) ===
1993 Canadian federal election
Party	Candidate	Votes	%	±%
Liberal	Mark Assad	39,274		
Bloc Québécois	Jules Fournier	25,006		
Progressive Conservative	Jérôme P. Falardeau	4,464		
New Democratic	Elizabeth Holden	1,096		
Natural Law	Danièle Bélair	736		
Marxist–Leninist	Nicole Leblanc	200		

1988 Canadian federal election
Party	Candidate	Votes	%	±%
Liberal	Mark Assad	23,507	43.28	+8.85
Progressive Conservative	Claudy Mailly	21,385	39.38	-11.53
New Democratic	Marius Tremblay	8,394	15.46	+2.49
Rhinoceros	Daniel Le Lièvre Villeneuve	660	1.22	
No affiliation	Nicole Leblanc	364	0.67	

=== 1949–1988 ===
1984 Canadian federal election
Party	Candidate	Votes	%	±%
Progressive Conservative	Claudy Mailly	25,873	50.91	+43.96
Liberal	René Cousineau	17,496	34.43	-44.17
New Democratic	Sylvie Rossignol	6,543	12.87	+2.25
Parti nationaliste	Jean Scuvée	766	1.51	
Commonwealth of Canada	Jean-Guy Méthot	142	0.28	
Total valid votes		50,820	100.00	

1980 Canadian federal election
Party	Candidate	Votes	%	±%
Liberal	René Cousineau	35,437	78.60	+6.71
New Democratic	Renée Pierre Brisson	4,792	10.63	+3.72
Progressive Conservative	Jean-Pierre Plouffe	3,134	6.95	+0.29
Social Credit	Marcelle Cormier	975	2.16	-10.87
Rhinoceros	François R. Penzes	640	1.42	
Marxist–Leninist	Christine Dandenault	108	0.24	+0.01
Total valid votes		45,086	100.00	

1979 Canadian federal election
Party	Candidate	Votes	%
Liberal	René Cousineau	34,234	71.89
Social Credit	Gérard Croteau	6,206	13.03
New Democratic	André Beaudry	3,292	6.91
Progressive Conservative	René Bergeron	3,174	6.66
Union populaire	André Côté	608	1.28
Marxist–Leninist	Christine Dandenault	108	0.23
Total valid votes		47,622	100.00
Total rejected ballots		340	
Turnout		47,962	74.80
Electors on the lists		64,124	
Source: Report of the Chief Electoral Officer, Thirty-first General Election, 1979.

1974 Canadian federal election
Party	Candidate	Votes	%	±%
Liberal	Gaston Clermont	19,513	60.15	+9.81
Social Credit	Marcel Clément	7,205	22.21	-7.78
Progressive Conservative	Robert Moreau	3,944	12.16	-1.03
New Democratic	Lise Ménard	1,781	5.49	-0.99
Total valid votes		32,443	100.00	

1972 Canadian federal election
Party	Candidate	Votes	%	±%
Liberal	Gaston Clermont	15,894	50.34	-3.19
Social Credit	Jean-Paul Descoeurs	9,469	29.99	+16.15
Progressive Conservative	Guy Lafortune	4,163	13.19	-15.10
New Democratic	Mychèle St-Louis	2,047	6.48	+2.14
Total valid votes		31,573	100.00	

Note: Social Credit vote is compared to Ralliement créditiste vote in the 1968 election.

1968 Canadian federal election
Party	Candidate	Votes	%	±%
Liberal	Gaston Clermont	14,348	53.53	+0.12
Progressive Conservative	Lévis Larocque	7,581	28.28	+8.08
Ralliement créditiste	Antoine Bédard	3,711	13.85	-3.25
New Democratic	Emile Mongeon	1,163	4.34	-1.96
Total valid votes		26,803	100.00	

1965 Canadian federal election
Party	Candidate	Votes	%	±%
Liberal	Gaston Isabelle	13,088	53.41	+6.77
Progressive Conservative	Jules Barrière	4,952	20.21	-3.38
Ralliement créditiste	Conrad Beaudoin	4,189	17.09	-8.24
New Democratic	Beverley Morin	1,543	6.30	+1.86
Independent Liberal	Roger Danis	734	3.00	
Total valid votes		24,506	100.00	

Note: Ralliement créditiste vote is compared to Social Credit vote in the 1963 election.

1963 Canadian federal election
Party	Candidate	Votes	%	±%
Liberal	Rodolphe Leduc	11,589	46.64	+4.42
Social Credit	Conrad Beaudoin	6,295	25.34	+4.82
Progressive Conservative	Thomas Van Dusen	5,861	23.59	-9.67
New Democratic	Roy Laberge	1,10	4.44	+0.42
Total valid votes		24,847	100.00	

1962 Canadian federal election
Party	Candidate	Votes	%	±%
Liberal	Rodolphe Leduc	10,135	42.22	-10.09
Progressive Conservative	Thomas Van Dusen	7,983	33.25	-10.20
Social Credit	Henri Meunier	4,925	20.52	+16.28
New Democratic	Charles J. De Breyne	963	4.01	
Total valid votes		24,006	100.00	

1958 Canadian federal election
Party	Candidate	Votes	%	±%
Liberal	Rodolphe Leduc	10,840	52.31	-6.48
Progressive Conservative	Réjean Patry	9,004	43.45	+13.31
Social Credit	Léo Joannisse	878	4.24	
Total valid votes		20,722	100.00	

1957 Canadian federal election
Party	Candidate	Votes	%	±%
Liberal	Rodolphe Leduc	10,770	58.79	-2.87
Progressive Conservative	Adrien Cloutier	5,522	30.14	+5.60
Independent Liberal	J. Robert Proulx	2,028	11.07	
Total valid votes		18,320	100.00	

Canadian federal by-election, 22 March 1954
Party	Candidate	Votes	%	±%
Nadon's death, 17 December 1953
Liberal	Rodolphe Leduc	6,568	61.66	-4.13
Progressive Conservative	Ernest-Anastase St-Jean	2,614	24.54	-5.62
Independent	Marcel-Bernard Bonnier	796	7.47	
Co-operative Commonwealth	Roger Boucher	674	6.33	+2.28
Total valid votes		10,652	100.00	

1953 Canadian federal election
Party	Candidate	Votes	%	±%
Liberal	Joseph-Célestin Nadon	10,759	65.79	+7.21
Progressive Conservative	Ernest-Anastase St-Jean	4,932	30.16	+1.02
Co-operative Commonwealth	Janet H.H. Morgan	662	4.05	
Total valid votes		16,353	100.00	

Canadian federal by-election, 24 October 1949
Party	Candidate	Votes	%	±%
Raymond appointed House of Commons Clerk, 5 August 1949
Liberal	Joseph-Célestin Nadon	5,438	58.58	-7.14
Progressive Conservative	Ernest-Anastase St-Jean	2,705	29.14	-0.49
Independent	Marcel-Bernard Bonnier	1,140	12.28	
Total valid votes		9,283	100.00	

1949 Canadian federal election
Party	Candidate	Votes	%
Liberal	Léon-Joseph Raymond	9,865	65.72
Progressive Conservative	Ernest-Anastase St-Jean	4,448	29.63
Union des électeurs	Joseph-Eugène Rochon	697	4.64
Total valid votes		15,010	100.00

== See also ==
- List of Canadian electoral districts
- Historical federal electoral districts of Canada
