= Honoré Achim =

Canadian politician and lawyer

Member of the Canadian Parliament for Labelle
- In office 1911–1917
- Preceded by: Charles Beautron Major
- Succeeded by: Hyacinthe-Adélard Fortier

MLA for Labelle
- In office 1917–1921
- Preceded by: Hyacinthe-Adélard Fortier
- Succeeded by: Désiré Lahaie

Personal details
- Born: August 2, 1881 Montreal, Quebec
- Died: May 14, 1950 (aged 68) Florence, Italy
- Resting place: Notre Dame des Neiges Cemetery, Montreal
- Party: Conservative (1911-1917); Liberal (1917)
- Other political affiliations: Quebec Liberal Party
- Profession: Lawyer

Honoré Achim (August 2, 1881 – May 14, 1950) was a Canadian politician and lawyer. He was a member of the Conservative Party of Canada between November 15, 1911, and June 28, 1917, then crossed the floor to the Liberal Party of Canada, as a result of the conscription issue, where he remained until October 6, 1917.

Born in Montreal, Quebec, Achim also served as a Member of the Legislative Assembly of Quebec representing the Quebec Liberal Party in Labelle until resigning on October 13, 1921.

After his death in 1950, he was entombed at the Notre Dame des Neiges Cemetery in Montreal.
