= Elisabeth Gidengil =

Canadian political scientist

- Born: 1946 or 1947 (age 78–79)
- Education: London School of Economics; New York University; McGill University
- Awards: Royal Society of Canada Fellow; Best Paper Award, APSA
- Scientific career
- Fields: Political science
- Workplaces: McGill University

Elisabeth Gidengil FRSC (born 1946 or 1947) is a Canadian political scientist, currently the Hiram Mills Professor of political science at McGill University. She uses national and cross-national survey methods to study political participation and engagement, voter behaviour and voter turnout, and political communication, focusing on the role of gender and race in Canadian politics. The Centre for the Study of Democratic Citizenship has called her "Canada’s pre-eminent scholar on political behaviour, gender and diversity, and the media."

== Education ==
Gidengil attended the London School of Economics and New York University. She earned her PhD in political science from McGill University.

== Career ==
Gidengil has been an author on numerous books, as well as journal articles in venues like the Canadian Journal of Political Science, Comparative Political Studies, Political Behavior, and Electoral Studies. She and her co-authors received the American Political Science Association's 1997 prize for the best paper presented at the previous year's meeting for their paper "The 1993 Canadian Election: Realignment, Dealignment, or Something Else?" Her co-authored books include The Unsteady State: The 1997 Canadian Federal Election (2000), Citizens (2004), and Dominance and Decline: Making Sense of Recent Canadian Elections (2012).

Gidengil was a member of the Canadian Election Study team from 1992 until 2008, and was the principal investigator of the study in 2008. Gidengil has also been on the planning committee for the Comparative Study of Electoral Systems. In 2008, Gidengil became the founding Director of the Centre for the Study of Democratic Citizenship, a consortium of McGill University, Concordia University, Montreal, Université Laval, Université de Montréal, Université du Québec à Montréal and Université TÉLUQ to study democratic citizenship using interdisciplinary tools and perspectives. She remained the Director until 2013, and in 2017 the Centre held a symposium in her honour. She is also a past president of the Canadian Political Science Association. She has been an editor for selective political science journals, notably the European Political Science Review.

In 2013, Gidengil was named a Fellow of the Royal Society of Canada in Academy II: the Academy of Social Sciences. Gidengil received an honorary doctorate from the Université Laval in June 2014.

Gidengil has been extensively cited in popular media reports on topics like Canadian politics and vote choice in venues like the FiveThirtyEight, the CBC, Maclean's, the Ottawa Citizen, and the Winnipeg Free Press, and her work has been recommended by The Hill Times.

== Selected works ==
- Citizens. With André Blais, Neil Nevitte, and Richard Nadeau. 2004
- "Where does turnout decline come from?" With André Blais and Neil Nevitte, European journal of political research. 2004
- Dominance and Decline: Making Sense of Recent Canadian Elections. With Neil Nevitte, Andre Blais, Joanna Everitt, and Patrick Fournier. 2012
- Nevitte, Neil; Blais, André; Gidengil, Elisabeth; Nadeau, Richard (2000). Unsteady State: The 1997 Canadian Federal Election. Don Mills, Ontario: Oxford University Press. ISBN 978-0-19-541466-0.

== Selected honours and awards ==
- Best Paper Award, American Political Science Association, 1997
- Fellow of the Royal Society of Canada, 2013
