= Maurice Lalonde (politician) =

Canadian politician (1901–1956)

Member of Parliament for Labelle
- In office October 1935 – April 1949
- Preceded by: Henri Bourassa
- Succeeded by: Henri Courtemanche

Personal details
- Born: 24 August 1901 Montreal, Quebec
- Died: 2 June 1956 (aged 54)
- Party: Liberal
- Spouse(s): Èléonore Cote m. 30 August 1927
- Profession: lawyer

Maurice Lalonde (24 August 1901 – 2 June 1956) was a Liberal Party member of the House of Commons of Canada. He was born in Montreal, Quebec, and became a lawyer by career.

The son of Wilfrid Lalonde and Blanche L'Archevèque, Lalonde attended Mont Laurier St. Joseph Seminary where he attained a Bachelor of Arts degree, then the Université de Montréal for law studies and then formally became a lawyer in 1927. He also owned the publication La Voix du Nord and served as president of the companies Mont-Laurier Aviation and Lievre Lumber. Lalonde practised law in Mont-Laurier.

He was first elected to Parliament at the Labelle riding in the 1935 general election and re-elected in 1940 and 1945. Lalonde did not seek another term at the 1949 election.

His son Fernand served in the Quebec National Assembly.
