= Claudy Mailly =

Canadian politician

Member of the Canadian Parliament for Gatineau
- In office 1984–1988
- Preceded by: René Cousineau
- Succeeded by: riding dissolved

Personal details
- Born: 30 November 1938 (age 87)
- Party: Progressive Conservative
- Spouse: Charles Lynch (to 1994, his death)
- Portfolio: Parliamentary Secretary to the Minister of National Revenue (1987-1988); Parliamentary Secretary to the Minister of Communications (1986-1987); Chief Government Whip's assistant (1984-1986)

Claudy Mailly (born 30 November 1938) is a Canadian former Progressive Conservative party member of the House of Commons of Canada. She is an author, corporate affairs consultant and economic consultant by career.

Mailly studied at Sir George Williams College then held various company positions such as Information Services Manager at Domtar, Special Assistant to Canada Post's president, and Corporate Affairs Advisor at the Royal Bank.

Mailly's first attempt to enter national politics was unsuccessful as she was defeated in the 1979 federal election at Papineau riding by the Liberal party's André Ouellet. She succeeded in the 1984 federal election at Gatineau becoming that riding's first Conservative Member of Parliament. She was defeated by Liberal Mark Assad in the 1988 federal election, after the riding became Gatineau—La Lièvre. Mailly served only one federal term, the 33rd Canadian Parliament.

Mailly was married to journalist Charles Lynch until his death in 1994.
