= Élie Beauregard =

Canadian politician

The Honourable Élie Beauregard PC
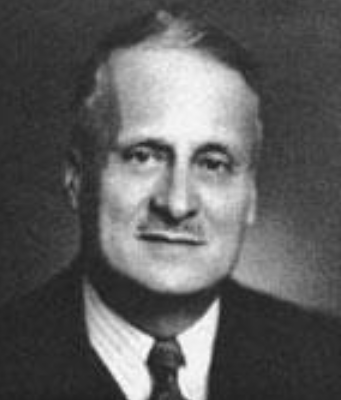

Senator for Rougemont, Quebec
- In office 1940–1954
- Preceded by: Rodolphe Lemieux
- Succeeded by: Henri Courtemanche

Personal details
- Born: July 8, 1884 La Patrie, Quebec, Canada
- Died: August 27, 1954 (aged 70)
- Party: Liberal
- Portfolio: Speaker of the Senate (1949-1953)

Élie Beauregard, PC (July 8, 1884 – August 27, 1954) was a Canadian lawyer and politician.

Born in La Patrie, Quebec, he studied law and was admitted to the Bar of Quebec in 1909. Active in the Liberal Party of Canada in Quebec, he was called to the Senate of Canada in 1940 representing the senatorial division of Rougemont, Quebec. He died in office in 1954. From 1949 to 1953, he was the Speaker of the Senate of Canada.
