= Richard Nadeau =

Canadian politician

Member of the Canadian Parliament for Gatineau
- In office January 23, 2006 – May 2, 2011
- Preceded by: Françoise Boivin
- Succeeded by: Françoise Boivin

Personal details
- Born: April 5, 1959 (age 67) Hawkesbury, Ontario
- Party: Bloc Québécois (federal); Action Gatineau (municipal)
- Spouse: Edith Gendron
- Education: University of Ottawa (BA, BEd)
- Profession: Teacher

Richard Nadeau (born April 5, 1959) is a Canadian teacher and politician who is the former Member of Parliament for the riding of Gatineau.

== Early life and career ==
Nadeau attended the University of Ottawa where he received degrees in history, political science and education. In addition to being a teacher, Nadeau has worked as an adviser and director of educational programs, and as a researcher and an archivist. He has also been a lobbyist for French education and has been involved in community theatre in Saskatchewan. He taught at the Gisèle Lalonde High School in Orleans, near Ottawa, where he, amongst other things, supervised and acted as speaker for the model UN club.

== Political career ==
=== Federal politics ===
In the 2000 federal election, Nadeau finished second in Gatineau behind Mark Assad of the Liberal Party of Canada by 13,197 votes. In the 2004 federal election, he finished second behind Françoise Boivin of the Liberals by 830 votes—a surprisingly close result, given that this had long been reckoned as one of the more federalist regions of Quebec.

He was elected in the 2006 federal election in a rematch against Boivin, becoming the first Bloc MP elected in the National Capital Region. He was also the third Bloc MP ever elected in the entire Outaouais region, after Maurice Dumas and Mario Laframboise.

In the 2008 Canadian federal election Nadeau received the smallest percentage of votes for a winning candidate, at just 29.13%, meaning that less than 3 out of 10 voters chose him as their candidate, despite him winning a plurality of votes and carrying the district for the Bloc over Boivin, now running for the New Democratic Party.

Boivin heavily defeated Nadeau by over 27,000 votes in the 2011 election as part of the massive NDP surge across Quebec. He tallied barely half of his vote from 2008.

In the 2025 election he again ran as the Bloc candidate in Gatineau, where he came third.

=== Municipal politics ===
On May 26, 2025, less than a month after losing the 2025 federal election, Nadeau announced that he would be seeking the Action Gatineau nomination in Lac-Beauchamp District for the 2025 municipal election. He was nominated on June 30, 2025.

== Personal life ==
Nadeau's wife, Edith Gendron, is the head of a Quebec separatist group called "Le Quebec, Un Pays". She was also the Parti Québécois candidate for the riding of Chapleau in Gatineau, in the 2007 provincial election. Nadeau's daughter, Myriam, was the Action Gatineau city councillor for Pointe-Gatineau District from 2013 to 2021.

== Electoral record ==
2025 Canadian federal election: Gatineau
Party	Candidate	Votes	%	±%	Expenditures
Liberal	Steven MacKinnon	34,751	60.54	+10.49	$94,914.50
Conservative	Kethlande Pierre	10,982	19.13	+8.02	$20,982.21
Bloc Québécois	Richard Nadeau	9,373	16.33	–7.09	$31,981.46
New Democratic	Daniel Simoncic	1,615	2.81	–5.81	none listed
People's	Mathieu Saint-Jean	505	0.88	–3.17	$513.91
Marxist–Leninist	Pierre Soublière	173	0.30	+0.20	$0.00
Total valid votes/expense limit		57,399	98.91	–	$131,410.18
Total rejected ballots		633	1.09		
Turnout		58,032	68.20		
Eligible voters		85,086			
Liberal notional hold		Swing		+1.24	
Source: Elections Canada
Note: number of eligible voters does not include voting day registrations.

2011 Canadian federal election: Gatineau
Party	Candidate	Votes	%	±%	Expenditures
New Democratic	Françoise Boivin	35,262	61.83	+35.71	
Bloc Québécois	Richard Nadeau	8,619	15.11	-14.04	
Liberal	Steve MacKinnon	7,975	13.98	-11.34	
Conservative	Jennifer Gearey	4,532	7.95	-8.86	
Green	Jonathan Meijer	639	1.12	-1.45	
Total valid votes/Expense limit		57,027	100.00		
Total rejected ballots		365	0.64		
Turnout		57,392	64.10		
Eligible voters		89,537			

2008 Canadian federal election
Party	Candidate	Votes	%	±%	Expenditures
Bloc Québécois	Richard Nadeau	15,189	29.15	-10.11	$78,498
New Democratic	Françoise Boivin	13,612	26.12	+16.11	$87,035
Liberal	Michel Simard	13,193	25.32	-5.92	$40,288
Conservative	Denis Tassé	8,762	16.81	+0.07	$52,464
Green	David Inglis	1,342	2.57	-0.12	
Total valid votes/Expense limit		52,098	100.00	$88,989	
Bloc Québécois hold		Swing		-13.11	

2006 Canadian federal election
Party	Candidate	Votes	%	±%	Expenditures
Bloc Québécois	Richard Nadeau	21,093	39.25	-1.02	$72,093
Liberal	Françoise Boivin	16,826	31.31	-10.78	$70,768
Conservative	Patrick Robert	9,014	16.77	+9.19	$62,953
New Democratic	Anne Levesque	5,354	9.96	+4.24	$5,811
Green	Gail Walker	1,456	2.71	-0.36	$5
Total valid votes/Expense limit		53,743	100.00	$82,260	
Bloc Québécois gain		Swing			

2004 Canadian federal election
Party	Candidate	Votes	%	±%	Expenditures
Liberal	Françoise Boivin	19,198	42.09	-9.37	$46,494
Bloc Québécois	Richard Nadeau	18,368	40.27	14.87	$20,574
Conservative	Gérald Nicolas	3,461	7.59	-9.65 (Note: Conservative vote is compared to the total of the Canadian Alliance vote and Progressive Conservative vote in the 2000 election.)	
New Democratic	Dominique Vaillancourt	2,610	5.72	+2.24	
Green	Brian Gibb	1,402	3.07		$144
Marijuana	Stéphane Salko	453	0.99	–	
Marxist–Leninist	Gabriel Girard-Bernier	125	0.27	0.00	
Total valid votes/Expense limit		45,617	100.00	$80,437	

== Works ==
- Nevitte, Neil; Blais, André; Gidengil, Elisabeth; Nadeau, Richard (2000). Unsteady State: The 1997 Canadian Federal Election. Don Mills, Ontario: Oxford University Press. ISBN 978-0-19-541466-0.
