= Gustave Roy =

Canadian politician

Member of Parliament for Labelle
- In office August 1953 – June 1957
- Preceded by: Henri Courtemanche
- Succeeded by: Henri Courtemanche

Personal details
- Born: 21 April 1907 Cap-Chat, Quebec
- Died: 5 January 1982 (aged 74) Mont-Laurier, Quebec
- Party: Liberal
- Spouse(s): Georgette Dupuis (m. 25 October 1937)
- Profession: physician, surgeon

Gustave Roy (21 April 1907 – 5 January 1982) was a Liberal party member of the House of Commons of Canada. Born in Cap-Chat, Quebec, he was a physician and surgeon by career.

The son of Gustave Roy and Vitaline Côté, Roy was educated at Rimouski Seminary, then at Université Laval where he received his medical degree. He set up practise in Mont-Laurier. Roy was also president and director for L'Écho de la Lièvre.

In 1937, a lumberman whose leg had been fractured was dissatisfied with Roy's treatment and attempted to shoot the doctor; his gun failed to discharge and the dissatisfied client was arrested.

He ran unsuccessfully for a seat in the Quebec assembly in 1952. He was first elected at the Labelle riding in the 1953 general election, unseating Progressive Conservative party incumbent Henri Courtemanche. After serving his only term, the 22nd Canadian Parliament, Roy was defeated by Courtemanche in the 1957 election. He died in Mont-Laurier in 1982.
