= Hyacinthe-Adélard Fortier =

Canadian politician (1875–1966)

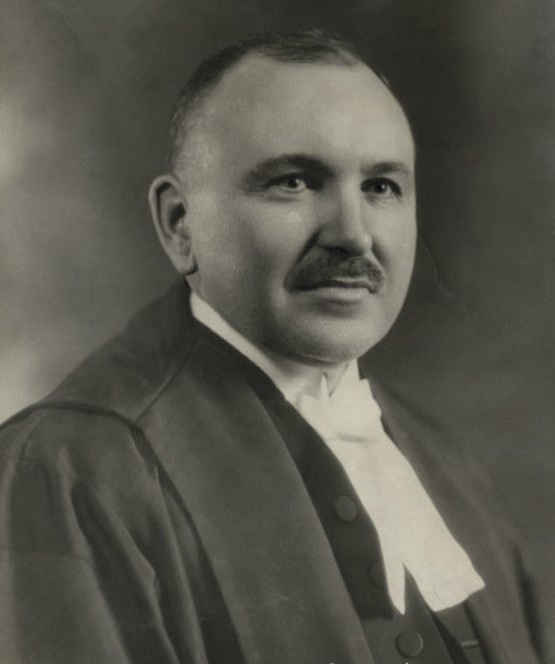

Member of the Canadian Parliament for Labelle
- In office 1917–1925
- Preceded by: Honoré Achim
- Succeeded by: Henri Bourassa

Member of the Legislative Assembly of Quebec for Labelle
- In office 1912–1917
- Preceded by: District was created in 1912
- Succeeded by: Honoré Achim

Personal details
- Born: 11 December 1875 Saint-Hermas, Quebec
- Died: 18 January 1966 (aged 90) Hull, Quebec
- Party: Liberal

Hyacinthe-Adélard Fortier (11 December 1875 – 18 January 1966) was a lawyer, judge and political figure in Quebec. He represented Labelle in the Legislative Assembly of Quebec from 1912 to 1917 and Labelle in the House of Commons of Canada from 1917 to 1925 as a Liberal.

He was born in Saint-Hermas, Quebec, the son of Isidore Fortier and Elmire Lalande, and was educated at the Séminaire de Sainte-Thérèse and the Université Laval. Fortier articled with Dandurand et Brodeur, was called to the Quebec bar in 1899 and set up practise in Hull with Charles Beautron Major. He married his partner's daughter Anne-Marie Major in 1901. Fortier was crown attorney for Ottawa district and was bâtonnier for Hull district from 1912 to 1916. He served on the municipal council for Hull in 1912. In the same year, Fortier was named King's Counsel. He resigned his seat in the Quebec assembly to run for a seat in the House of Commons in 1917. From 1925 to 1958, he was a judge in the Quebec Superior Court for Trois-Rivières district. Fortier died in Hull at the age of 91 and was buried in the Notre-Dame-de-Lorette cemetery there.
