= Gaston Clermont =

Canadian politician (1913–2005)

- Official 1974 portrait

Member of Parliament for Labelle
- In office October 1960 – April 1963
- Preceded by: Henri Courtemanche
- Succeeded by: Gérard Girouard
- In office November 1965 – June 1968
- Preceded by: Gérard Girouard
- Succeeded by: Léo Cadieux

Member of Parliament for Gatineau
- In office June 1968 – March 1979
- Preceded by: Joseph Isabelle
- Succeeded by: René Cousineau

Personal details
- Born: 5 December 1913 Chomedey, Quebec
- Died: 12 January 2005 (aged 91) Ottawa, Ontario
- Party: Liberal
- Profession: Businessman, executive, manager

Gaston Clermont (5 December 1913 – 12 January 2005) was a Liberal party member of the House of Commons of Canada and a Canadian businessman.

Clermont was born in Chomedey, Quebec (now Laval, Quebec). He is the son of Romain Clermont and Dina Hotte. Clermont was educated in Montreal and entered business at Thurso. In 1946, he married Marie-Blanche Boulerice.

He was first elected at the Labelle riding in a 31 October 1960 by-election and served for the latter portion of the 24th Canadian Parliament. He remained a Member of Parliament there until 1968, except for a one-term defeat in the 1963 federal election by the Social Credit party's Gérard Girouard.

For the 1968 federal election, Clermont switched to the Gatineau riding and was elected there for three terms. He left national office after completing his term in 1979 with the 30th Parliament.
