= Fernand Ladouceur =

Canadian politician (1925–1999)

Fernand Ladouceur (2 August 1925 – 23 December 1999) was a Progressive Conservative party member of the House of Commons of Canada. Ladouceur was born in Sainte-Agathe-des-Monts, Quebec and became an insurance broker by career.

He was elected in the 1984 federal election at Labelle electoral district. He left national politics in 1988 after serving in the 33rd Canadian Parliament and was not a candidate in that year's federal election.
