= Comparative Study of Electoral Systems =

Collaborative research project

The Comparative Study of Electoral Systems (CSES) is a collaborative research project among national election studies around the world. Participating countries and polities include a common module of survey questions in their national post-election studies. The resulting data are collated together along with voting, demographic, district and macro variables into one dataset allowing comparative analysis of voting behavior from a multilevel perspective.

The CSES is published as a free, public dataset. The project is administered by the CSES Secretariat, a joint effort between the Institute for Social Research at the University of Michigan and the GESIS – Leibniz Institute for the Social Sciences in Germany.

== Aims and content of the study ==
The CSES project was founded in 1994 with two major aims. The first was to promote international collaboration between national election studies. The second was to allow researchers to study variations in political institutions, especially electoral systems, and their effects on individual attitudes and behaviors, especially turnout and vote choice.

CSES datasets contain variables at three levels. The first is micro-level variables which are answered by respondents during post-election surveys in each included country. The second is district-level variables that contain election results from the electoral districts that survey respondents are situated in. The third is macro-level variables containing information about the country context and electoral system, as well as aggregate data such as economic indicators and democracy indices. This nested data structure, as depicted in Figure 1, allows for multilevel analysis.

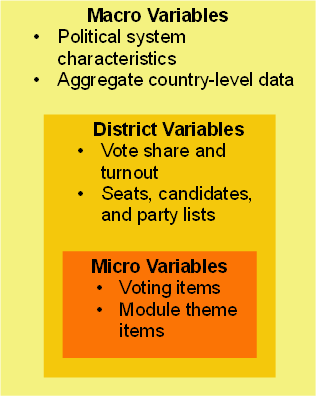
Figure 1: Visualization of CSES multilevel data structure

A new thematic module is devised by the CSES Planning Committee every five years. Between the final releases of the complete modules, CSES also disseminates advance releases of datasets periodically, which include partial data for modules that have not been fully released yet.

- Survey data collection for module 1 was conducted between 1996 and 2001 and focuses on system performance. The module allows investigation of the impact of electoral institutions on citizens' political cognition and behavior as well as of the nature of political and social cleavages and alignment. Furthermore, it enables research about citizens' evaluation of democratic institutions and processes. Module 1 includes 39 election studies conducted in 33 countries.
- Survey data collection for module 2 was conducted between 2001 and 2006 and focuses on accountability and representation. It addresses the contrast between the view that elections are a mechanism to hold government accountable and the view that they are a means to ensure that citizens' views and interests are properly represented in the democratic process. Module 2 includes 41 election studies conducted in 38 countries.
- Survey data collection for module 3 was conducted between 2006 and 2011. The module allows investigating the meaningfulness of electoral choices and, accordingly, focuses on a major aspect of electoral research: the contingency in choice of available options. Module 3 includes 50 election studies conducted in 41 countries.
- Survey data collection for module 4 was conducted between 2011 and 2016 and focuses on distributional politics and social protection. The main topics investigated are voters' preferences for public policy and the mediating factors of political institutions and voting behavior. Module 4 includes 45 election studies conducted in 39 countries.
- Survey data collection for module 5 was conducted between 2016 and 2021 and focuses on the electorate's attitudes towards political elites, on the one hand, and towards "out groups", on the other hand. It thus enables research on attitudes and voting behavior in the context of a rise of parties campaigning on anti-establishment messages and in opposition to "out groups". Module 5 includes 56 election studies conducted in 45 countries.
- Survey data collection for module 6 is ongoing, with the survey to be administered between 2021 and 2026. It focuses on the theme "Representative Democracy Under Pressure" with questions tapping citizens' views on the democratic system and perceptions of system outputs, gender representation, preferences for government and the impact of the COVID-19 pandemic. The CSES Module 6 Second Advance Release published in December 2025 includes 18 election studies conducted in 17 countries.

A complete table of all variables available across modules can be found on the CSES website.

CSES also has an Integrated Module Dataset (IMD) which brings together the existing Standalone CSES Modules (CSES Modules 1–5 inclusive) into one longitudinal and harmonized dataset. Variables that appear in at least three Standalone CSES Modules, up to and including CSES Module 5, are eligible for inclusion in IMD, with all polities participating in CSES included in the dataset.

CSES IMD includes over 395,000 individual-level observations across 230 elections in 59 polities, with voter evaluations of over 800 political parties. Highlights of the IMD file are party and coalition numerical codes synchronized across CSES Modules and the incorporation of data bridging variables allowing CSES data to be easily merged with other common datasets in the social sciences. CSES IMD launched in December 2018 and is being rolled out on a phased basis with the latest release, Phase 4 released in February 2024.

== Countries in the study ==
	Module 1	Module 2	Module 3	Module 4	Module 5	Module 6
Albania		2005			2017	
Argentina				2015		
Australia	1996	2004	2007	2013	2019	2022
Austria			2008	2013	2017	2024
Belarus	2001		2008			
Belgium	1999, 1999 (Note: Two election studies were run in Belgium – one in Belgium-Flanders, and one in Belgium-Walloon)	2003			2019, 2019	
Brazil		2002	2006,2010	2014	2018	2022
Bulgaria		2001		2014		
Canada	1997	2004	2008	2011, 2015	2019	
Chile	1999	2005	2009		2017	
Costa Rica					2018	
Croatia			2007			
Czech Republic	1996	2002	2006,2010	2013	2017,2021	
Denmark	1998	2001	2007		2019	2022
El Salvador					2019	
Estonia			2011			
Finland		2003	2007,2011	2015	2019	
France		2002	2007	2012	2017	2022
Germany	1998	2002, 2002 (Note: Two election studies were run in Germany in 2002 – one was a telephone study, and one was a mail-back study.)	2005, 2009	2013	2017,2021	
(United Kingdom) Great Britain	1997	2005		2015	2017,2019	
Greece			2009	2012, 2015	2015,2019	
Hong Kong	1998, 2000	2004	2008	2012	2016	
Hungary	1998	2002			2018	
Iceland	1999	2003	2007, 2009	2013	2016, 2017	
India					2019	
(Republic of Ireland) Ireland		2002	2007	2011	2016	
Israel	1996	2003	2006	2013	2020	
Italy		2006			2018	
Japan	1996	2004	2007	2013	2017	
Kenya				2013		
Kyrgyzstan		2005				
Latvia			2010	2011, 2014	2018	
Lithuania	1997				2016,2020	
Mexico	1997, 2000	2003	2006, 2009	2012,2015	2018	
Montenegro				2012	2016	2023
Netherlands	1998	2002	2006,2010		2017,2021	
New Zealand	1996	2002	2008	2011,2014	2017,2020	2023
North Macedonia						2024
Norway	1997	2001	2005, 2009	2013	2017	
Peru	2000, 2001	2006	2011	2016	2021	
Philippines		2004	2010	2016		
Poland	1997	2001	2005, 2007	2011	2019	2023
Portugal	2002 (Note: The Portugal 2002 election study occurred during the transition between module 1 and module 2, and included both modules.)	2002, 2005	2009	2015	2019	2022, 2024
Romania	1996	2004	2009	2012, 2014	2016	
Russia	1999, (Note: Russia 1999 and 2000: These two years were a panel study, with 1999 being for the parliamentary election and 2000 being for the presidential election.) 2000	2004				
Serbia				2012		
Slovakia			2010	2016	2020	2023
Slovenia	1996	2004	2008	2011		2022
South Africa			2009	2014		
South Korea	2000	2004	2008	2012	2016	
Spain	1996, 2000	2004	2008			
Sweden	1998	2002	2006	2014	2018	2022
Switzerland	1999	2003	2007	2011	2019	2023
Taiwan	1996	2001, 2004	2008	2012	2016, 2020	2024
Thailand	2001		2007	2011	2019	
Tunisia					2019	
Turkey			2011	2015	2018	2023
Ukraine	1998					
United States of America	1996	2004	2008	2012	2016,2020	2024
Uruguay			2009		2019	

A frequently updated election study table across all modules can be found on the CSES website.

== Data access ==
CSES data are available publicly and are free of charge. Data releases are non-proprietary – in other words the data are made available to the public without preferential or advance access to anyone. Data is available in multiple formats including for common statistical packages like STATA, SPSS, SAS and R. The data can be downloaded from the CSES website as well as via the GESIS data catalogue. The GESIS online analysis tool ZACAT can furthermore be used to browse and explore the dataset.

== Organizational structure and funding ==
=== The CSES Secretariat ===
In conjunction with national election study collaborators, the CSES Secretariat administers the CSES project. It consists of staff from the GESIS – Leibniz Institute for the Social Sciences in Germany and the University of Michigan, Ann-Arbor in the United States. The Secretariat is responsible for compiling the final CSES dataset by harmonizing the single country studies into a cross-national dataset. It is also responsible for collecting the district and macro data, for data documentation, and for ensuring data quality. The Secretariat, furthermore, maintains the CSES website, promotes the project, provides support to the user community, and organizes conferences and project meetings.

=== The Planning Committee, collaborators and the CSES Plenary ===
The CSES research agenda, study design, and questionnaires are developed by an international committee of leading scholars in political science, sociology, and survey methodology. This committee is known as the CSES Planning Committee. At the beginning of each new module, a new Planning Committee is established. Nominations for the Planning Committee come from the user community, with membership of the Committee then being approved by the CSES Plenary Meeting. The Plenary Meeting is made up of national collaborators from each national election study involved in the CSES. Ideas for new modules can be submitted by anyone. More information on the current planning committee, its members, and subcommittee reports, as well as on past Planning Committees can be found on the CSES website. A list of country collaborators who participate in CSES can also be found on the CSES website.

=== Funding and support ===
The work of the CSES Secretariat is funded by the American National Science Foundation, the GESIS – Leibniz Institute for the Social Sciences and the University of Michigan's Center for Political Studies along with in-kind support from participating election studies, additional organizations that sponsor planning meetings and conferences, and the many organizations that fund election studies by CSES collaborators.

== Klingemann Prize ==
Each year, the CSES awards the GESIS Klingemann Prize for the best CSES scholarship (paper, book, dissertation, or other scholarly work, broadly defined). The award is sponsored by the GESIS – Leibniz Institute for the Social Sciences and is named in honor of Professor Dr. Hans-Dieter Klingemann, co-founder of the CSES, an internationally renowned political scientist who made significant contributions to cross-national electoral research. Nominated works must make extensive use of CSES and have a publication date in the calendar year prior to the award, either in print or online.

=== Winners of the Klingemann Prize ===
- 2024: Andres Reiljan (University of Tartu), Diego Garzia (University of Lausanne), Frederico Ferreira da Silva (University of Lausanne) and Alexander H. Trechsel (University of Lucerne) (2024): Patterns of Affective Polarization toward Parties and Leaders across the Democratic World. American Political Science Review, 118(2), 654–670.
- 2023: James Adams (University of California, Davis), David Bracken (University of California, Davis), Noam Gidron (Hebrew University of Jerusalem), Will Horne (Georgia State University), Diana Z. O'Brien (Washington University in St. Louis) and Kaitlin Senk (Exeter University) (2022): Can't We All Just Get Along? How Women MPs Can Ameliorate Affective Polarization in Western Publics. American Political Science Review, 117(1), 318–324.
- 2022: Vicente Valentim (University of Oxford) (2021): Parliamentary representation and the normalization of radical right support. Comparative political studies, 54(14), 2475–2511.
- 2021: Enrique Hernández (Universitat Autònoma de Barcelona), Eva Anduiza (Universitat Autònoma de Barcelona) and Guillem Rico (Universitat Autònoma de Barcelona) (2021): Affective polarization and the salience of elections. Electoral Studies, 69(1), 1–9.
- 2020: Eelco Harteveld (University of Amsterdam), Stefan Dahlberg (University of Gothenburg), Andrej Kokkonen (Aarhus University) and Wouter Van Der Brug (University of Amsterdam) (2019). "Gender Differences in Vote Choice: Social Cues and Social Harmony as Heuristics". British Journal of Political Science, 49(3), 1141–1161.
- 2019: Ruth Dassonneville (University of Montreal) and Ian McAllister (Australian National University) (2018). "Gender, Political Knowledge, and Descriptive Representation: The Impact of Long-Term Socialization". American Journal of Political Science, 62(2), 249–265.
- 2018: André Blais (University of Montreal), Eric Guntermann (University of Montreal) and Marc-André Bodet (University of Laval) (2017). "Linking Party Preferences and the Composition of Government: A New Standard for Evaluating the Performance of Electoral Democracy". Political Science Research and Methods, 5(2), 315–331.
- 2017: Dani Marinova (Autonomous University of Barcelona) (2016). "Coping with Complexity: How Voters Adapt to Unstable Parties". ECPR Press.
- 2016: Kasara Kimuli (Columbia University) and Pavithra Suryanarayan (Johns Hopkins University) (2015). "When Do the Rich Vote Less Than the Poor and Why? Explaining Turnout Inequality across the World". American Journal of Political Science, 59(3), 613–627.
- 2015: Noam Lupu (University of Wisconsin-Madison) (2015). "Party Polarization and Mass Partisanship: A Comparative Perspective". Political Behavior, 37(2), 331–356.
- 2014: Richard R. Lau (Rutgers University), Parina Patel (Georgetown University), Dalia F. Fahmy (Long Island University) and Robert R. Kaufman (Rutgers University) (2014). "Correct Voting Across Thirty-Three Democracies: A Preliminary Analysis". British Journal of Political Science, 44(02), 239–259.
- 2013: Mark Andreas Kayser (Hertie School of Governance) and Michael Peress (University of Rochester) (2012). "Benchmarking across Borders: Electoral Accountability and the Necessity of Comparison". American Political Science Review, 106(03), 661–684.
- 2012: Russell J. Dalton (University of California, Irvine) David M. Farrell (University College Dublin) and Ian McAllister (Australian National University) (2011). "Political Parties and Democratic Linkage. How Parties Organize Democracy". Oxford University Press.
- 2011: Matt Golder (Florida State University) and Jacek Stramski (Florida State University) (2011). "Ideological Congruence and Electoral Institutions". American Journal of Political Science, 54(1), 90–106.
