= Results of the 2019 Canadian federal election by riding =

Candidates of the 2019 Canadian federal election
- October 21, 2019

The 2019 Canadian federal election took place on Monday, 21 October 2019. Candidates have been declared for each of the 338 electoral districts or "ridings".

Results by riding

Equal-area ridings

== Abbreviations guide ==
- Animal – Animal Protection Party of Canada
- BQ – Bloc Québécois
- CFF – Canada's Fourth Front
- CHP – Christian Heritage Party
- CNP – Canadian Nationalist Party
- Comm. – Communist Party
- Conservative – Conservative Party
- Green – Green Party
- Ind. – Independent
- Liberal – Liberal Party
- Libert. – Libertarian Party
- Mar. – Marijuana Party
- M-L – Marxist–Leninist Party
- NA – No Affiliation (Note: No Affiliation is used by Elections Canada when a candidate leaves the Party Affiliation entry blank on his or her registration; this is often done by candidates from unregistered political parties.)
- NCA – National Citizens Alliance
- NDP – New Democratic Party
- PC – Progressive Canadian Party
- PIQ – Parti pour l'Indépendance du Québec
- PPC – People's Party of Canada
- Rhino. – Rhinoceros Party
- SCC – Stop Climate Change Party (Note: The word Party does not appear in their Elections Canada registration but does appear on their websites.)
- unreg. – Party not yet eligible for registration with Elections Canada
- UPC – United Party of Canada (Note: This United Party was registered in 2019 and is unrelated to the United Party that ran in the 2015 election.)
- VCP – Veterans Coalition Party of Canada

== Candidates and results ==
Note: Candidates' names are as registered with Elections Canada.
† = Not seeking re-election
‡ = Running for re-election in different riding
§ = represents that the incumbent was defeated for nomination
$ = represents that the incumbent was announced as nominated by their party but later chose to retire
# = represents that the incumbent was announced as nominated by their party but later lost that party's nomination through departure from caucus
Bold indicates party leader.

=== Newfoundland and Labrador ===
Electoral district	Candidates					Incumbent
Electoral district	Liberal	Conservative	NDP	Green	Other	Incumbent
Avalon	Kenneth McDonald; 19,122; 46.26%	Matthew Chapman; 12,855; 31.10%	Lea Mary Movelle; 7,142; 17.28%	Greg Malone; 2,215; 5.36%		Ken McDonald
Bonavista—Burin—Trinity	Churence Rogers; 14,707; 45.70%	Sharon Vokey; 12,697; 39.46%	Matthew Cooper; 3,855; 11.98%	Kelsey Reichel; 920; 2.86%		Churence Rogers
Coast of Bays—Central—Notre Dame	Scott Simms; 16,514; 48.31%	Alex Bracci; 12,081; 35.34%	Noel Joe; 4,224; 12.36%	Byron White; 1,363; 3.99%		Scott Simms
Labrador	Yvonne Jones; 4,851; 42.48%	Larry Flemming; 3,548; 31.07%	Michelene Gray; 2,796; 24.49%	Tyler Colbourne; 224; 1.96%		Yvonne Jones
Long Range Mountains	Gudie Hutchings; 18,199; 47.36%	Josh Eisses; 10,873; 28.30%	Holly Pike; 7,609; 19.80%	Lucas Knill; 1,334; 3.47%	Robert Miles (VCP); 411; 1.07%	Gudie Hutchings
St. John's East	Nick Whalen; 14,962; 33.20%	Joedy Wall; 8,141; 18.06%	Jack Harris; 21,148; 46.92%	David Peters; 821; 1.82%		Nick Whalen
St. John's South—Mount Pearl	Seamus O'Regan; 20,793; 51.13%	Terry Martin; 7,767; 19.10%	Anne Marie Anonsen; 10,890; 26.78%	Alexandra Hayward; 740; 1.82%	David Jones (CHP); 141 0.35%	Seamus O'Regan
St. John's South—Mount Pearl	Seamus O'Regan; 20,793; 51.13%	Terry Martin; 7,767; 19.10%	Anne Marie Anonsen; 10,890; 26.78%	Alexandra Hayward; 740; 1.82%	Benjamin Ruckpaul (PPC); 335 0.82%	Seamus O'Regan

=== Prince Edward Island ===
Electoral district	Candidates					Incumbent
Electoral district	Liberal	Conservative	NDP	Green	Christian Heritage	Incumbent
Cardigan	Lawrence MacAulay; 10,939; 49.35%	Wayne Phelan; 6,439; 29.05%	Lynne Thiele; 1,481; 6.68%	Glen Beaton; 3,068; 13.84%	Christene Squires; 240; 1.08%	Lawrence MacAulay
Charlottetown	Sean Casey; 8,812; 44.26%	Robert A. Campbell; 4,040; 20.29%	Joe Byrne; 2,238; 11.24%	Darcie Lanthier; 4,648; 23.35%	Fred MacLeod; 172; 0.86%	Sean Casey
Egmont	Bobby Morrissey; 8,016; 39.73%	Logan McLellan; 6,934; 34.36%	Sharon Dunn; 1,230; 6.10%	Alex Clark; 3,998; 19.81%		Bobby Morrissey
Malpeque	Wayne Easter; 9,533; 41.38%	Stephen Stewart; 5,908; 25.64%	Craig Nash; 1,495; 6.49%	Anna Keenan; 6,103; 26.49%		Wayne Easter

=== Nova Scotia ===
Electoral district	Candidates						Incumbent
Electoral district	Liberal	Conservative	NDP	Green	PPC	Others	Incumbent
Cape Breton—Canso	Mike Kelloway; 16,694; 38.88%	Alfie MacLeod; 14,821; 34.52%	Laurie Suitor; 6,354; 14.80%	Clive Doucet; 3,321; 7.73%	Billy Joyce; 925; 2.15%	Michelle Dockrill (Ind.); 685 1.60%	Rodger Cuzner†
Cape Breton—Canso	Mike Kelloway; 16,694; 38.88%	Alfie MacLeod; 14,821; 34.52%	Laurie Suitor; 6,354; 14.80%	Clive Doucet; 3,321; 7.73%	Billy Joyce; 925; 2.15%	Darlene Lynn LeBlanc (NCA); 140 0.33%	Rodger Cuzner†
Central Nova	Sean Fraser; 20,718; 46.59%	George Canyon; 13,201; 29.69%	Betsy MacDonald; 5,806; 13.06%	Barry Randle; 3,478; 7.82%	Al Muir; 938; 2.11%	Chris Frazer (Comm.); 180 0.40%	Sean Fraser
Central Nova	Sean Fraser; 20,718; 46.59%	George Canyon; 13,201; 29.69%	Betsy MacDonald; 5,806; 13.06%	Barry Randle; 3,478; 7.82%	Al Muir; 938; 2.11%	Michael Slowik (Ind.); 149 0.34%	Sean Fraser
Cumberland—Colchester	Lenore Zann; 16,672; 36.68%	Scott Armstrong; 16,219; 35.69%	Larry Duchesne; 5,451; 11.99%	Jason Blanch; 6,015; 13.23%	William Archer; 608; 1.34%	**Stephen J Garvey** (NCA); 109 0.24%	Bill Casey†
Cumberland—Colchester	Lenore Zann; 16,672; 36.68%	Scott Armstrong; 16,219; 35.69%	Larry Duchesne; 5,451; 11.99%	Jason Blanch; 6,015; 13.23%	William Archer; 608; 1.34%	Jody O'Blenis (VCP); 144 0.32%	Bill Casey†
Cumberland—Colchester	Lenore Zann; 16,672; 36.68%	Scott Armstrong; 16,219; 35.69%	Larry Duchesne; 5,451; 11.99%	Jason Blanch; 6,015; 13.23%	William Archer; 608; 1.34%	Matthew V. Rushton (Ind.); 232 0.51%	Bill Casey†
Dartmouth—Cole Harbour	Darren Fisher; 24,259; 45.34%	Jason Cole; 8,638; 16.15%	Emma Norton; 14,435; 26.98%	Lil MacPherson; 5,280; 9.87%	Michelle Lindsay; 887; 1.66%		Darren Fisher
Halifax	Andy Fillmore; 23,681; 42.48%	Bruce Holland; 6,456; 11.58%	Christine Saulnier; 16,747; 30.04%	Jo-Ann Roberts; 8,013; 14.37%	Duncan McGenn; 633; 1.14%	Bill Wilson (Animal); 222; 0.40%	Andy Fillmore
Halifax West	Geoff Regan; 26,885; 49.46%	Fred Shuman; 10,488; 19.30%	Jacob Wilson; 10,429; 19.19%	Richard Zurawski; 6,555; 12.06%			Geoff Regan
Kings—Hants	Kody Blois; 20,806; 43.31%	Martha MacQuarrie; 11,905; 24.78%	Stephen Schneider; 8,254; 17.18%	Brogan Anderson; 6,029; 12.55%	Matthew Southall; 786; 1.64%	Stacey Dodge (VCP); 118 0.25%	vacant
Kings—Hants	Kody Blois; 20,806; 43.31%	Martha MacQuarrie; 11,905; 24.78%	Stephen Schneider; 8,254; 17.18%	Brogan Anderson; 6,029; 12.55%	Matthew Southall; 786; 1.64%	Nicholas Tan (Rhino.); 138 0.29%	vacant
Sackville—Preston—Chezzetcook	Darrell Samson; 19,925; 40.22%	Kevin Copley; 11,211; 22.63%	Matt Stickland; 11,860; 23.94%	Anthony Edmonds; 5,725; 11.56%	Sybil Hogg; 816; 1.65%		Darrell Samson
South Shore—St. Margarets	Bernadette Jordan; 21,886; 41.67%	Rick Perkins; 14,744; 28.07%	Jessika Hepburn; 8,361; 15.92%	Thomas Trappenberg; 6,070; 11.56%	Robert Monk; 667; 1.27%	Steven Foster (Ind.); 376 0.72%	Bernadette Jordan
South Shore—St. Margarets	Bernadette Jordan; 21,886; 41.67%	Rick Perkins; 14,744; 28.07%	Jessika Hepburn; 8,361; 15.92%	Thomas Trappenberg; 6,070; 11.56%	Robert Monk; 667; 1.27%	Jason Matthews (VCP); 125 0.24%	Bernadette Jordan
South Shore—St. Margarets	Bernadette Jordan; 21,886; 41.67%	Rick Perkins; 14,744; 28.07%	Jessika Hepburn; 8,361; 15.92%	Thomas Trappenberg; 6,070; 11.56%	Robert Monk; 667; 1.27%	Shawn McMahon (Ind.); 165 0.31%	Bernadette Jordan
South Shore—St. Margarets	Bernadette Jordan; 21,886; 41.67%	Rick Perkins; 14,744; 28.07%	Jessika Hepburn; 8,361; 15.92%	Thomas Trappenberg; 6,070; 11.56%	Robert Monk; 667; 1.27%	Kevin Schulthies (CHP); 124 0.24%	Bernadette Jordan
Sydney—Victoria	Jaime Battiste; 12,536; 30.90%	Eddie Orrell; 11,227; 27.68%	Jodi McDavid; 8,146; 20.08%	Lois Foster; 2,249; 5.54%		**Randy Joy** (VCP); 248 0.61%	Mark Eyking†
Sydney—Victoria	Jaime Battiste; 12,536; 30.90%	Eddie Orrell; 11,227; 27.68%	Jodi McDavid; 8,146; 20.08%	Lois Foster; 2,249; 5.54%		Archie MacKinnon (Ind.); 5,679 14.00%	Mark Eyking†
Sydney—Victoria	Jaime Battiste; 12,536; 30.90%	Eddie Orrell; 11,227; 27.68%	Jodi McDavid; 8,146; 20.08%	Lois Foster; 2,249; 5.54%		Kenzie MacNeil (Ind.); 480 1.18%	Mark Eyking†
West Nova	Jason Deveau; 17,025; 36.38%	Chris d'Entremont; 18,390; 39.30%	Matthew Dubois; 5,010; 10.71%	Judy N Green; 5,939; 12.69%		Gloria Jane Cook (VCP); 434; 0.93%	Colin Fraser†

=== New Brunswick ===
Electoral district	Candidates						Incumbent
Electoral district	Liberal	Conservative	NDP	Green	PPC	Other	Incumbent
Acadie—Bathurst	Serge Cormier; 26,547; 55.14%	Martine Savoie; 10,352; 21.50%	Daniel Thériault; 6,967; 14.47%	Robert Kryszko; 4,277; 8.88%			Serge Cormier
Beauséjour	Dominic LeBlanc; 24,948; 46.47%	Vincent Cormier; 9,438; 17.58%	Jean-Marc Bélanger; 3,940; 7.34%	Laura Reinsborough; 14,305; 26.65%	Nancy Mercier; 1,054; 1.96%		Dominic LeBlanc
Fredericton	Matt DeCourcey; 13,544; 27.41%	Andrea Johnson; 15,011; 30.38%	Mackenzie Thomason; 2,946; 5.96%	Jenica Atwin; 16,640; 33.68%	Jason Paull; 776; 1.57%	Brandon Kirby (Libert.); 126 0.26%	Matt DeCourcey
Fredericton	Matt DeCourcey; 13,544; 27.41%	Andrea Johnson; 15,011; 30.38%	Mackenzie Thomason; 2,946; 5.96%	Jenica Atwin; 16,640; 33.68%	Jason Paull; 776; 1.57%	Jacob Patterson (Comm.); 80 0.16%	Matt DeCourcey
Fredericton	Matt DeCourcey; 13,544; 27.41%	Andrea Johnson; 15,011; 30.38%	Mackenzie Thomason; 2,946; 5.96%	Jenica Atwin; 16,640; 33.68%	Jason Paull; 776; 1.57%	Lesley Thomas (Animal); 286 0.58%	Matt DeCourcey
Fundy Royal	Alaina Lockhart; 12,433; 25.56%	Rob Moore; 22,389; 46.02%	James Tolan; 4,804; 9.88%	Tim Thompson; 7,275; 14.95%	Rudy Neumayer; 1,249; 2.57%	David Raymond Amos (Ind.); 295 0.61%	Alaina Lockhart
Fundy Royal	Alaina Lockhart; 12,433; 25.56%	Rob Moore; 22,389; 46.02%	James Tolan; 4,804; 9.88%	Tim Thompson; 7,275; 14.95%	Rudy Neumayer; 1,249; 2.57%	John Evans (NCA); 201 0.41%	Alaina Lockhart
Madawaska—Restigouche	René Arseneault; 17,331; 50.28%	Nelson Fox; 9,801; 28.43%	Chad Betteridge; 2,212; 6.42%	Louis Bérubé; 5,125; 14.87%			René Arseneault
Miramichi—Grand Lake	Pat Finnigan; 12,722; 36.77%	Peggy McLean; 12,352; 35.70%	Eileen Clancy Teslenko; 2,875; 8.31%	Patty Deitch; 3,914; 11.31%	Ron Nowlan; 1,179; 3.41%	Mathew Grant Lawson (Ind.); 396 1.14%	Pat Finnigan
Miramichi—Grand Lake	Pat Finnigan; 12,722; 36.77%	Peggy McLean; 12,352; 35.70%	Eileen Clancy Teslenko; 2,875; 8.31%	Patty Deitch; 3,914; 11.31%	Ron Nowlan; 1,179; 3.41%	Allison MacKenzie (Ind.); 1,160 3.35%	Pat Finnigan
Moncton—Riverview—Dieppe	Ginette Petitpas Taylor; 22,261; 42.95%	Sylvie Godin-Charest; 12,200; 23.54%	Luke MacLaren; 6,164; 11.89%	Claire Kelly; 9,287; 17.92%	Stephen Driver; 1,258; 2.43%	Brad MacDonald (Animal); 373 0.72%	Ginette Petitpas Taylor
Moncton—Riverview—Dieppe	Ginette Petitpas Taylor; 22,261; 42.95%	Sylvie Godin-Charest; 12,200; 23.54%	Luke MacLaren; 6,164; 11.89%	Claire Kelly; 9,287; 17.92%	Stephen Driver; 1,258; 2.43%	Rhys Williams (CHP); 285 0.55%	Ginette Petitpas Taylor
New Brunswick Southwest	Karen Ludwig; 10,110; 25.54%	John Williamson; 19,451; 49.15%	Douglas Mullin; 3,251; 8.21%	Susan Jonah; 5,352; 13.52%	Meryl Sarty; 1,214; 3.07%	Abe Scott (VCP); 200; 0.51%	Karen Ludwig
Saint John—Rothesay	Wayne Long; 15,443; 37.43%	Rodney Weston; 14,006; 33.95%	Armand Cormier; 5,046; 12.23%	Ann McAllister; 4,165; 10.10%	Adam J. C. Salesse; 1,260; 3.05%	Neville Barnett (Ind.); 150 0.36%	Wayne Long
Saint John—Rothesay	Wayne Long; 15,443; 37.43%	Rodney Weston; 14,006; 33.95%	Armand Cormier; 5,046; 12.23%	Ann McAllister; 4,165; 10.10%	Adam J. C. Salesse; 1,260; 3.05%	Stuart Jamieson (Ind.); 1,183 2.87%	Wayne Long
Tobique—Mactaquac	Kelsey MacDonald; 9,631; 25.21%	Richard Bragdon; 19,229; 50.34%	Megan Aiken; 3,007; 7.87%	Rowan P. Miller; 5,398; 14.13%	Dominic Guay; 936; 2.45%		T. J. Harvey†

=== Quebec ===
==== Eastern Quebec ====
Electoral district	Candidates							Incumbent
Electoral district	Liberal	Conservative	BQ	NDP	Green	PPC	Other	Incumbent
Avignon—La Mitis—Matane—Matapédia	Rémi Massé; 12,188; 33.89%	Natasha Tremblay; 2,756; 7.66%	Kristina Michaud; 18,500; 51.43%	Rémi-Jocelyn Côté; 1,435; 3.99%	James Morrison; 699; 1.94%	Éric Barnabé; 210; 0.58%	Mathieu Castonguay (Rhino.); 180; 0.50%	Rémi Massé
Bellechasse—Les Etchemins—Lévis	Laurence Harvey; 10,734; 16.66%	Steven Blaney; 32,283; 50.09%	Sébastien Bouchard-Théberge; 14,754; 22.89%	Khuon Chamroeun; 3,256; 5.05%	André Voyer; 1,925; 2.99%	Marc Johnston; 1,307; 2.03%	Yves Gilbert (CHP); 188; 0.29%	Steven Blaney
Gaspésie—Les Îles-de-la-Madeleine	Diane Lebouthillier; 16,296; 42.46%	Jean-Pierre Pigeon; 3,022; 7.87%	Guy Bernatchez; 15,659; 40.80%	Lynn Beaulieu; 1,722; 4.49%	Dennis Drainville; 1,130; 2.94%	Eric Hébert; 198; 0.52%	Jay Cowboy (Rhino.); 353; 0.92%	Diane Lebouthillier
Montmagny—L'Islet—Kamouraska—Rivière-du-Loup	Aladin Legault d'Auteuil; 8,210; 16.29%	Bernard Généreux; 20,989; 41.65%	Louis Gagnon; 16,261; 32.27%	Hugo Latulippe; 3,481; 6.91%	Denis Ducharme; 1,030; 2.04%	Serge Haché; 417; 0.83%		Bernard Généreux
Rimouski-Neigette—Témiscouata—Les Basques	Chantal Pilon; 10,095; 22.06%	Nancy Brassard-Fortin; 4,073; 8.90%	Maxime Blanchette-Joncas; 17,314; 37.83%	Guy Caron; 13,050; 28.51%	Jocelyn Rioux; 824; 1.80%	Pierre Lacombe; 232; 0.51%	Lysane Picker-Paquin (Rhino.); 179; 0.39%	Guy Caron

==== Côte-Nord and Saguenay ====
Electoral district	Candidates							Incumbent
Electoral district	Liberal	Conservative	BQ	NDP	Green	PPC	Other	Incumbent
Beauport—Côte-de-Beaupré—Île d'Orléans—Charlevoix	Manon Fortin; 10,608; 20.95%	Sylvie Boucher; 15,044; 29.71%	Caroline Desbiens; 18,407; 36.35%	Gérard Briand; 2,841; 5.61%	Richard Guertin; 1,355; 2.68%	Jean-Claude Parent; 1,045; 2.06%	Raymond Bernier (NA); 1,335; 2.64%	Sylvie Boucher
Chicoutimi—Le Fjord	Dajana Dautovic; 7,504; 17.10%	Richard Martel; 16,155; 36.82%	Valérie Tremblay; 15,321; 34.91%	Stéphane Girard; 2,855; 6.51%	Lynda Youde; 1,388; 3.16%	Jimmy Voyer; 359; 0.82%	Line Bélanger (Rhino.); 299; 0.68%	Richard Martel
Jonquière	Vincent Garneau; 7,849; 15.90%	Philippe Gagnon; 10,338; 20.94%	Mario Simard; 17,577; 35.60%	Karine Trudel; 12,141; 24.59%	Lyne Bourdages; 1,009; 2.04%	Sylvie Théodore; 453; 0.92%		Karine Trudel
Lac-Saint-Jean	Richard Hébert; 13,633; 25.14%	Jocelyn Fradette; 12,544; 23.13%	Alexis Brunelle-Duceppe; 23,839; 43.96%	Jean-Simon Fortin; 2,753; 5.08%	Julie Gagnon-Bond; 1,010; 1.86%	Danny Boudreault; 448; 0.83%		Richard Hébert
Manicouagan	Dave Savard; 7,793; 19.29%	François Corriveau; 7,771; 19.24%	Marilène Gill; 21,768; 53.89%	Colleen McCool; 1,482; 3.67%	Jacques Gélineau; 1,293; 3.20%	Gabriel Côté; 283; 0.70%		Marilène Gill

==== Quebec City ====
Electoral district	Candidates							Incumbent
Electoral district	Liberal	Conservative	BQ	NDP	Green	PPC	Other	Incumbent
Beauport—Limoilou	Antoine Bujold; 13,020; 25.94%	Alupa Clarke; 13,185; 26.27%	Julie Vignola; 15,149; 30.18%	Simon-Pierre Beaudet; 5,599; 11.16%	Dalila Elhak; 2,127; 4.24%	Alicia Bédard; 1,033; 2.06%	Claude Moreau (M-L); 78; 0.16%	Alupa Clarke
Charlesbourg—Haute-Saint-Charles	René-Paul Coly; 12,584; 21.29%	Pierre Paul-Hus; 22,484; 38.05%	Alain D'Eer; 16,053; 27.16%	Guillaume Bourdeau; 4,554; 7.71%	Samuel Moisan-Domm; 2,042; 3.46%	Joey Pronovost; 1,379; 2.33%		Pierre Paul-Hus
Louis-Hébert	Joël Lightbound; 25,140; 40.51%	Marie-Josée Guérette; 10,912; 17.58%	Christian Hébert; 17,375; 28.00%	Jérémie Juneau; 4,884; 7.87%	Macarena Diab; 2,466; 3.97%	Daniel Brisson; 1,016; 1.64%	Ali Dahan (Ind.); 267; 0.43%	Joël Lightbound
Louis-Saint-Laurent	Jean-Christophe Cusson; 13,571; 20.70%	Gérard Deltell; 29,279; 44.66%	Jeanne-Paule Desgagnés; 14,674; 22.38%	Colette Amram Ducharme; 4,339; 6.62%	Sandra Mara Riedo; 2,155; 3.29%	Guillaume Côté; 1,543; 2.35%		Gérard Deltell
Québec	Jean-Yves Duclos; 18,047; 33.30%	Bianca Boutin; 8,118; 14.98%	Christiane Gagnon; 17,722; 32.70%	Tommy Bureau; 6,220; 11.48%	Luc Joli-Coeur; 2,949; 5.44%	Bruno Dabiré; 674; 1.24%	**Sébastien CoRhino** (Rhino.); 349 0.64%	Jean-Yves Duclos
Québec	Jean-Yves Duclos; 18,047; 33.30%	Bianca Boutin; 8,118; 14.98%	Christiane Gagnon; 17,722; 32.70%	Tommy Bureau; 6,220; 11.48%	Luc Joli-Coeur; 2,949; 5.44%	Bruno Dabiré; 674; 1.24%	Luc Paquin (PIQ); 119 0.22%	Jean-Yves Duclos

==== Central Quebec ====
Electoral district	Candidates							Incumbent
Electoral district	Liberal	Conservative	BQ	NDP	Green	PPC	Other	Incumbent
Bécancour—Nicolet—Saurel	Nathalie Rochefort; 9,332; 17.83%	Pierre-André Émond; 8,434; 16.11%	Louis Plamondon; 29,653; 56.66%	Carole Lennard; 2,732; 5.22%	David Turcotte; 1,697; 3.24%	Richard Synnott; 489; 0.93%		Louis Plamondon
Berthier—Maskinongé	Christine Poirier; 7,796; 13.83%	Josée Bélanger; 5,812; 10.31%	Yves Perron; 21,200; 37.62%	Ruth Ellen Brosseau; 19,698; 34.95%	Éric Laferrière; 1,008; 1.79%	Luc Massé; 428; 0.76%	Alain Bélanger (Ind.); 154 0.27%	Ruth Ellen Brosseau
Berthier—Maskinongé	Christine Poirier; 7,796; 13.83%	Josée Bélanger; 5,812; 10.31%	Yves Perron; 21,200; 37.62%	Ruth Ellen Brosseau; 19,698; 34.95%	Éric Laferrière; 1,008; 1.79%	Luc Massé; 428; 0.76%	Martin Acetaria Caesar Jubinville (Rhino.); 151 0.27%	Ruth Ellen Brosseau
Berthier—Maskinongé	Christine Poirier; 7,796; 13.83%	Josée Bélanger; 5,812; 10.31%	Yves Perron; 21,200; 37.62%	Ruth Ellen Brosseau; 19,698; 34.95%	Éric Laferrière; 1,008; 1.79%	Luc Massé; 428; 0.76%	Danny Légaré (Mar.); 107 0.19%	Ruth Ellen Brosseau
Joliette	Michel Bourgeois; 12,995; 22.52%	Jean-Martin Masse; 5,176; 8.97%	Gabriel Ste-Marie; 33,590; 58.22%	Julienne Soumaoro; 2,623; 4.55%	Érica Poirier; 2,343; 4.06%	Sylvain Prescott; 498; 0.86%	Paul Savard (PIQ); 474; 0.82%	Gabriel Ste-Marie
Lévis—Lotbinière	Ghislain Daigle; 10,761; 16.95%	Jacques Gourde; 28,297; 44.57%	François-Noël Brault; 15,921; 25.08%	Christel Marchand; 4,355; 6.86%	Patrick Kerr; 1,908; 3.01%	Marc Fontaine; 2,247; 3.54%		Jacques Gourde
Montcalm	Isabel Sayegh; 11,200; 20.44%	Gisèle Desroches; 4,942; 9.02%	Luc Thériault; 31,791; 58.01%	Julian Bonello-Stauch; 3,514; 6.41%	Mathieu Goyette; 2,416; 4.41%	Hugo Clénin; 524; 0.96%	Marc Labelle (PIQ); 419; 0.76%	Luc Thériault
Portneuf—Jacques-Cartier	Annie Talbot; 12,876; 19.91%	Joël Godin; 28,110; 43.46%	Mathieu Bonsaint; 15,707; 24.29%	David-Roger Gagnon; 3,758; 5.81%	Marie-Claude Gaudet; 2,308; 3.57%	Luca Abbatiello; 1,915; 2.96%		Joël Godin
Repentigny	Josée Larose; 18,111; 27.67%	Pierre Branchaud; 4,878; 7.45%	Monique Pauzé; 34,837; 53.22%	Meryem Benslimane; 4,470; 6.83%	Diane Beauregard; 2,289; 3.50%	Samuel Saint-Laurent; 524; 0.80%	Micheline Boucher Granger (PIQ); 347; 0.53%	Monique Pauzé
Saint-Maurice—Champlain	François-Philippe Champagne; 23,104; 39.55%	Bruno-Pier Courchesne; 9,542; 16.34%	Nicole Morin; 19,950; 34.15%	Barthélémy Boisguérin; 3,071; 5.26%	Stéphanie Dufresne; 1,809; 3.10%	Julie Déziel; 938; 1.61%		François-Philippe Champagne
Trois-Rivières	Valérie Renaud-Martin; 15,774; 26.06%	Yves Lévesque; 15,240; 25.17%	Louise Charbonneau; 17,240; 28.48%	Robert Aubin; 10,090; 16.67%	Marie Duplessis; 1,492; 2.46%	Marc André Gingras; 565; 0.93%	Ronald St-Onge Lynch (Ind.); 137; 0.23%	Robert Aubin

==== Eastern Townships ====
Electoral district	Candidates								Incumbent
Electoral district	Liberal	Conservative	BQ	NDP	Green	PPC	Rhinoceros	Other	Incumbent
Beauce	Adam Veilleux; 6,971; 11.73%	Richard Lehoux; 22,860; 38.47%	Guillaume Rodrigue; 8,410; 14.15%	François Jacques-Côté; 1,847; 3.11%	Josiane Fortin; 1,461; 2.46%	**Maxime Bernier**; 16,796; 28.26%	Maxime Bernier; 1,084; 1.82%		Maxime Bernier
Brome—Missisquoi	Lyne Bessette; 23,450; 38.17%	Bruno Côté; 7,697; 12.53%	Monique Allard; 21,152; 34.43%	Sylvie Jetté; 4,887; 7.95%	Normand Dallaire; 3,302; 5.37%	François Poulin; 456; 0.74%	Steeve Cloutier; 310; 0.50%	Lawrence Cotton (VCP); 187; 0.30%	Denis Paradis†$
Compton—Stanstead	Marie-Claude Bibeau; 21,731; 37.31%	Jessy Mc Neil; 8,446; 14.50%	David Benoît; 18,571; 31.89%	Naomie Mathieu Chauvette; 5,607; 9.63%	Jean Rousseau; 3,044; 5.23%	Paul Reed; 586; 1.01%	Jonathan Therrien; 252; 0.43%		Marie-Claude Bibeau
Drummond	William Morales; 9,552; 17.42%	Jessica Ebacher; 9,083; 16.57%	Martin Champoux; 24,574; 44.82%	François Choquette; 8,716; 15.90%	Frédérik Bernier; 1,856; 3.39%	Steeve Paquet; 525; 0.96%	Réal Batrhino; 270; 0.49%	Lucas Munger (Animal); 248; 0.45%	François Choquette
Mégantic—L'Érable	Isabelle Grégoire; 7,388; 15.55%	Luc Berthold; 23,392; 49.24%	Priscilla Corbeil; 12,249; 25.78%	Mathieu Boisvert; 1,936; 4.08%	Nicole Charette; 1,258; 2.65%	Marie Claude Lauzier; 812; 1.71%	Damien Roy; 256; 0.54%	Jean Paradis (Ind.); 217; 0.46%	Luc Berthold
Richmond—Arthabaska	Marc Patry; 8,868; 15.12%	Alain Rayes; 26,553; 45.28%	Olivier Nolin; 16,539; 28.21%	Olivier Guérin; 2,864; 4.88%	Laura Horth-Lepage; 3,133; 5.34%	Jean Landry; 681; 1.16%			Alain Rayes
Saint-Hyacinthe—Bagot	René Vincelette; 11,903; 21.29%	Bernard Barré; 8,062; 14.42%	Simon-Pierre Savard-Tremblay; 23,143; 41.39%	Brigitte Sansoucy; 10,297; 18.42%	Sabrina Huet-Côté; 2,031; 3.63%	Jean-François Bélanger; 478; 0.85%			Brigitte Sansoucy
Shefford	Pierre Breton; 22,605; 37.11%	Nathalie Clermont; 7,495; 12.30%	Andréanne Larouche; 23,503; 38.58%	Raymonde Plamondon; 3,705; 6.08%	Katherine Turgeon; 2,814; 4.62%	Mariam Sabbagh; 497; 0.82%		Darlène Daviault (PIQ); 294; 0.48%	Pierre Breton
Sherbrooke	Élisabeth Brière; 17,490; 29.28%	Dany Sévigny; 6,362; 10.65%	Claude Forgues; 15,470; 25.90%	Pierre-Luc Dusseault; 16,881; 28.26%	Mathieu Morin; 2,716; 4.55%		Steve Côté; 219; 0.37%	Edwin Moreno (Ind.); 471 0.79%	Pierre-Luc Dusseault
Sherbrooke	Élisabeth Brière; 17,490; 29.28%	Dany Sévigny; 6,362; 10.65%	Claude Forgues; 15,470; 25.90%	Pierre-Luc Dusseault; 16,881; 28.26%	Mathieu Morin; 2,716; 4.55%		Steve Côté; 219; 0.37%	Hubert Richard (NA); 117 0.20%	Pierre-Luc Dusseault

==== Montérégie ====
Electoral district	Candidates							Incumbent
Electoral district	Liberal	Conservative	BQ	NDP	Green	PPC	Other	Incumbent
Beloeil—Chambly	Marie-Chantal Hamel; 16,059; 23.11%	Véronique Laprise; 4,305; 6.20%	**Yves-François Blanchet**; 35,068; 50.46%	Matthew Dubé; 10,086; 14.51%	Pierre Carrier; 3,255; 4.68%	Chloé Bernard; 512; 0.74%	**Michel Blondin** (PIQ); 205; 0.30%	Matthew Dubé
Brossard—Saint-Lambert	Alexandra Mendès; 30,537; 53.90%	Glenn Hoa; 6,112; 10.79%	Marie-Claude Diotte; 11,131; 19.65%	Marc Audet; 5,410; 9.55%	Grégory De Luca; 2,935; 5.18%	Sam Nassif; 527; 0.93%		Alexandra Mendès
Châteauguay—Lacolle	Brenda Shanahan; 20,118; 38.39%	Hugues Laplante; 5,851; 11.17%	Claudia Valdivia; 19,479; 37.17%	Marika Lalime; 4,005; 7.64%	Meryam Haddad; 1,929; 3.68%	Jeff Benoit; 563; 1.07%	Pierre Chénier (M-L); 64 0.12%	Brenda Shanahan
Châteauguay—Lacolle	Brenda Shanahan; 20,118; 38.39%	Hugues Laplante; 5,851; 11.17%	Claudia Valdivia; 19,479; 37.17%	Marika Lalime; 4,005; 7.64%	Meryam Haddad; 1,929; 3.68%	Jeff Benoit; 563; 1.07%	Marc Gagnon (PIQ); 393 0.75%	Brenda Shanahan
La Prairie	Jean-Claude Poissant; 22,504; 36.56%	Isabelle Lapointe; 5,540; 9.00%	Alain Therrien; 25,707; 41.76%	Victoria Hernandez; 4,744; 7.71%	Barbara Joannette; 2,565; 4.17%	Gregory Yablunovsky; 393; 0.64%	Normand Chouinard (M-L); 100; 0.16%	Jean-Claude Poissant
Longueuil—Charles-LeMoyne	Sherry Romanado; 20,114; 39.02%	Stéphane Robichaud; 3,811; 7.39%	Cathy Lepage; 18,794; 36.46%	Kalden Dhatsenpa; 5,289; 10.26%	Casandra Poitras; 2,978; 5.78%	Henri Cousineau; 558; 1.08%		Sherry Romanado
Longueuil—Saint-Hubert	Réjean Hébert; 20,471; 34.21%	Patrick Clune; 3,779; 6.31%	Denis Trudel; 23,061; 38.54%	Éric Ferland; 5,104; 8.53%	Pierre Nantel; 6,745; 11.27%	Ellen Comeau; 467; 0.78%	Pierre-Luc Filion (Ind.); 217; 0.36%	Pierre Nantel
Montarville	Michel Picard; 21,061; 35.56%	Julie Sauvageau; 4,138; 6.99%	Stéphane Bergeron; 25,366; 42.83%	Djaouida Sellah; 4,984; 8.41%	Jean-Charles Pelland; 2,967; 5.01%	Julie Lavallée; 501; 0.85%	Thomas Thibault-Vincent (Rhino.); 211; 0.35%	Michel Picard
Pierre-Boucher—Les Patriotes—Verchères	Simon Chalifoux; 17,333; 28.52%	Mathieu Daviault; 4,910; 8.08%	Xavier Barsalou-Duval; 31,009; 51.02%	Sean English; 4,192; 6.90%	Dany Gariépy; 2,955; 4.86%	Clifford Albert; 384; 0.63%		Xavier Barsalou-Duval
Saint-Jean	Jean Rioux; 18,906; 30.56%	Martin Thibert; 6,612; 10.69%	Christine Normandin; 27,750; 44.85%	Chantal Reeves; 4,794; 7.75%	André-Philippe Chenail; 3,127; 5.05%	Marc Hivon; 397; 0.64%	Yvon Savary (PIQ); 289; 0.47%	Jean Rioux
Salaberry—Suroît	Marc Faubert; 18,682; 29.70%	Cynthia Larivière; 6,116; 9.72%	Claude DeBellefeuille; 29,975; 47.65%	Joan Gottman; 5,024; 7.99%	Nahed AlShawa; 1,997; 3.17%	Alain Savard; 767; 1.22%	Luc Bertrand (PIQ); 342; 0.54%	Anne Minh-Thu Quach†
Vaudreuil—Soulanges	Peter Schiefke; 32,254; 47.33%	Karen Cox; 7,804; 11.45%	Noémie Rouillard; 16,600; 24.36%	Amanda MacDonald; 7,368; 10.81%	Cameron Stiff; 3,405; 5.00%	Kaylin Tam; 711; 1.04%		Peter Schiefke

==== Eastern Montreal ====
Electoral district	Candidates								Incumbent
Electoral district	Liberal	Conservative	BQ	NDP	Green	PPC	Marxist-Leninist	Other	Incumbent
Hochelaga	Soraya Martinez Ferrada; 18,008; 33.95%	Christine Marcoux; 2,381; 4.49%	Simon Marchand; 17,680; 33.34%	Catheryn Roy-Goyette; 11,451; 21.59%	Robert D. Morais; 2,618; 4.94%	Stepan Balatsko; 377; 0.71%	Christine Dandenault; 107; 0.20%	Chinook Blais-Leduc (Rhino.); 314 0.59%	Marjolaine Boutin-Sweet†
Hochelaga	Soraya Martinez Ferrada; 18,008; 33.95%	Christine Marcoux; 2,381; 4.49%	Simon Marchand; 17,680; 33.34%	Catheryn Roy-Goyette; 11,451; 21.59%	Robert D. Morais; 2,618; 4.94%	Stepan Balatsko; 377; 0.71%	Christine Dandenault; 107; 0.20%	JP Fortin (Comm.); 101 0.19%	Marjolaine Boutin-Sweet†
Honoré-Mercier	Pablo Rodríguez; 29,543; 58.66%	Guy Croteau; 4,808; 9.55%	Jacques Binette; 9,979; 19.81%	Chu Anh Pham; 4,130; 8.20%	Domenico Cusmano; 1,373; 2.73%	Patrick St-Onge; 459; 0.91%	Yves Le Seigle; 71; 0.14%		Pablo Rodríguez
La Pointe-de-l'Île	Jonathan Plamondon; 16,898; 30.43%	Robert Coutu; 3,984; 7.17%	Mario Beaulieu; 26,010; 46.84%	Ève Péclet; 6,057; 10.91%	Franco Fiori; 1,910; 3.44%	Randy Manseau; 388; 0.70%	Geneviève Royer; 88; 0.16%	Jacinthe Lafrenaye (PIQ); 199; 0.36%	Mario Beaulieu
Laurier—Sainte-Marie	Steven Guilbeault; 22,306; 41.76%	Lise des Greniers; 1,502; 2.81%	Michel Duchesne; 12,188; 22.82%	Nimâ Machouf; 13,453; 25.19%	Jamil Azzaoui; 3,225; 6.04%	Christine Bui; 320; 0.60%	Serge Lachapelle; 98; 0.18%	Archie Morals (Rhino.); 208 0.39%	Hélène Laverdière†
Laurier—Sainte-Marie	Steven Guilbeault; 22,306; 41.76%	Lise des Greniers; 1,502; 2.81%	Michel Duchesne; 12,188; 22.82%	Nimâ Machouf; 13,453; 25.19%	Jamil Azzaoui; 3,225; 6.04%	Christine Bui; 320; 0.60%	Serge Lachapelle; 98; 0.18%	Dimitri Mourkes (Ind.); 42 0.08%	Hélène Laverdière†
Laurier—Sainte-Marie	Steven Guilbeault; 22,306; 41.76%	Lise des Greniers; 1,502; 2.81%	Michel Duchesne; 12,188; 22.82%	Nimâ Machouf; 13,453; 25.19%	Jamil Azzaoui; 3,225; 6.04%	Christine Bui; 320; 0.60%	Serge Lachapelle; 98; 0.18%	Adrien Welsh (Comm.); 67 0.13%	Hélène Laverdière†
Rosemont—La Petite-Patrie	Geneviève Hinse; 14,576; 24.21%	Johanna Sarfati; 1,405; 2.33%	Claude André; 14,306; 23.76%	Alexandre Boulerice; 25,575; 42.48%	Jean Désy; 3,539; 5.88%	Bobby Pellerin; 293; 0.49%	Gisèle Desrochers; 80; 0.13%	Jos Guitare Lavoie (Rhino.); 346 0.57%	Alexandre Boulerice
Rosemont—La Petite-Patrie	Geneviève Hinse; 14,576; 24.21%	Johanna Sarfati; 1,405; 2.33%	Claude André; 14,306; 23.76%	Alexandre Boulerice; 25,575; 42.48%	Jean Désy; 3,539; 5.88%	Bobby Pellerin; 293; 0.49%	Gisèle Desrochers; 80; 0.13%	Normand Raymond (Comm.); 86 0.14%	Alexandre Boulerice

==== Western Montreal ====
Electoral district	Candidates								Incumbent
Electoral district	Liberal	Conservative	BQ	NDP	Green	PPC	Marxist-Leninist	Other	Incumbent
Dorval—Lachine—LaSalle	Anju Dhillon; 27,821; 52.92%	Céline Laquerre; 5,543; 10.54%	Jean-Frédéric Vaudry; 8,974; 17.07%	Lori Morrison; 6,207; 11.81%	Réjean Malette; 2,898; 5.51%	Arash Torbati; 528; 1.00%		Fang Hu (PC); 426 0.81%	Anju Dhillon
Dorval—Lachine—LaSalle	Anju Dhillon; 27,821; 52.92%	Céline Laquerre; 5,543; 10.54%	Jean-Frédéric Vaudry; 8,974; 17.07%	Lori Morrison; 6,207; 11.81%	Réjean Malette; 2,898; 5.51%	Arash Torbati; 528; 1.00%		Xavier Watso (Rhino.); 177 0.34%	Anju Dhillon
Lac-Saint-Louis	Francis Scarpaleggia; 34,622; 58.16%	Ann Francis; 9,083; 15.26%	Julie Benoît; 3,169; 5.32%	Dana Chevalier; 7,263; 12.20%	Milan Kona-Mancini; 4,176; 7.02%	Gary Charles; 805; 1.35%		Ralston Coelho (CNP); 28 0.05%	Francis Scarpaleggia
Lac-Saint-Louis	Francis Scarpaleggia; 34,622; 58.16%	Ann Francis; 9,083; 15.26%	Julie Benoît; 3,169; 5.32%	Dana Chevalier; 7,263; 12.20%	Milan Kona-Mancini; 4,176; 7.02%	Gary Charles; 805; 1.35%		Victoria de Martigny (Animal); 379 0.64%	Francis Scarpaleggia
LaSalle—Émard—Verdun	David Lametti; 22,803; 43.52%	Claudio Rocchi; 3,690; 7.04%	Isabel Dion; 12,619; 24.09%	Steven Scott; 8,628; 16.47%	Jency Mercier; 3,583; 6.84%	Daniel Turgeon; 490; 0.94%	Eileen Studd; 39; 0.07%	Rhino Jacques Bélanger (Rhino.); 265 0.51%	David Lametti
LaSalle—Émard—Verdun	David Lametti; 22,803; 43.52%	Claudio Rocchi; 3,690; 7.04%	Isabel Dion; 12,619; 24.09%	Steven Scott; 8,628; 16.47%	Jency Mercier; 3,583; 6.84%	Daniel Turgeon; 490; 0.94%	Eileen Studd; 39; 0.07%	Julien Côté (Ind.); 274 0.52%	David Lametti
Mount Royal	Anthony Housefather; 24,590; 56.30%	David Tordjman; 10,887; 24.93%	Xavier Levesque; 1,757; 4.02%	Eric-Abel Baland; 3,609; 8.26%	Clément Badra; 2,389; 5.47%	Zachary Lozoff; 362; 0.83%	Diane Johnston; 85; 0.19%		Anthony Housefather
Notre-Dame-de-Grâce—Westmount	Marc Garneau; 28,323; 56.28%	Neil Drabkin; 5,759; 11.44%	Jennifer Jetté; 2,359; 4.69%	Franklin Gertler; 7,753; 15.41%	Robert Green; 5,397; 10.73%	André Valiquette; 565; 1.12%	Rachel Hoffman; 67; 0.13%	Jeffery A. Thomas (Ind.); 98; 0.19%	Marc Garneau
Outremont	Rachel Bendayan; 19,148; 46.19%	Jasmine Louras; 2,707; 6.53%	Célia Grimard; 5,741; 13.85%	Andrea Clarke; 8,319; 20.07%	Daniel Green; 5,018; 12.10%	Sabin Lévesque; 369; 0.89%		Mark John Hiemstra (Rhino.); 155; 0.37%	Rachel Bendayan
Pierrefonds—Dollard	Sameer Zuberi; 31,305; 56.43%	Mariam Ishak; 9,797; 17.66%	Edline Henri; 4,469; 8.06%	Bruno Ibrahim El-Khoury; 5,687; 10.25%	Lisa Mintz; 2,866; 5.17%	Lee Weishar; 711; 1.28%		Shahid Khan (Ind.); 242 0.44%	Frank Baylis†$
Pierrefonds—Dollard	Sameer Zuberi; 31,305; 56.43%	Mariam Ishak; 9,797; 17.66%	Edline Henri; 4,469; 8.06%	Bruno Ibrahim El-Khoury; 5,687; 10.25%	Lisa Mintz; 2,866; 5.17%	Lee Weishar; 711; 1.28%		Martin Plante (Ind.); 394 0.71%	Frank Baylis†$
Saint-Laurent	Emmanuella Lambropoulos; 23,527; 58.60%	Richard Serour; 7,005; 17.45%	Thérèse Miljours; 2,845; 7.09%	Miranda Gallo; 4,065; 10.13%	Georgia Kokotsis; 2,150; 5.36%	Christopher Mikus; 484; 1.21%	Ginette Boutet; 71; 0.18%		Emmanuella Lambropoulos
Ville-Marie—Le Sud-Ouest—Île-des-Sœurs	Marc Miller; 28,087; 53.48%	Michael Forian; 4,609; 8.78%	Nadia Bourque; 6,899; 13.14%	Sophie Thiébaut; 8,274; 15.75%	Liana Canton Cusmano; 3,718; 7.08%	Jean Langlais; 520; 0.99%	Linda Sullivan; 45; 0.09%	Tommy Gaudet (Rhino.); 140 0.27%	Marc Miller
Ville-Marie—Le Sud-Ouest—Île-des-Sœurs	Marc Miller; 28,087; 53.48%	Michael Forian; 4,609; 8.78%	Nadia Bourque; 6,899; 13.14%	Sophie Thiébaut; 8,274; 15.75%	Liana Canton Cusmano; 3,718; 7.08%	Jean Langlais; 520; 0.99%	Linda Sullivan; 45; 0.09%	Louise B. O'Sullivan (Ind.); 117 0.22%	Marc Miller
Ville-Marie—Le Sud-Ouest—Île-des-Sœurs	Marc Miller; 28,087; 53.48%	Michael Forian; 4,609; 8.78%	Nadia Bourque; 6,899; 13.14%	Sophie Thiébaut; 8,274; 15.75%	Liana Canton Cusmano; 3,718; 7.08%	Jean Langlais; 520; 0.99%	Linda Sullivan; 45; 0.09%	Marc Patenaude (NA); 113 0.22%	Marc Miller

==== Northern Montreal and Laval ====
Electoral district	Candidates							Incumbent
Electoral district	Liberal	Conservative	BQ	NDP	Green	PPC	Other	Incumbent
Ahuntsic-Cartierville	Mélanie Joly; 28,904; 52.45%	Kathy Laframboise; 4,013; 7.28%	André Parizeau; 11,974; 21.73%	Zahia El-Masri; 6,284; 11.40%	Jean-Michel Lavarenne; 3,352; 6.08%	Raymond Ayas; 584; 1.06%		Mélanie Joly
Alfred-Pellan	Angelo Iacono; 26,015; 47.90%	Angelo Esposito; 5,917; 10.90%	Michel Lachance; 15,549; 28.63%	Andriana Kocini; 4,109; 7.57%	Marguerite Howells; 1,958; 3.61%	Matthieu Couture; 471; 0.87%	Julius Buté (PIQ); 177 0.33%	Angelo Iacono
Alfred-Pellan	Angelo Iacono; 26,015; 47.90%	Angelo Esposito; 5,917; 10.90%	Michel Lachance; 15,549; 28.63%	Andriana Kocini; 4,109; 7.57%	Marguerite Howells; 1,958; 3.61%	Matthieu Couture; 471; 0.87%	Dwayne Cappelletti (Ind.); 113 0.21%	Angelo Iacono
Bourassa	Emmanuel Dubourg; 23,231; 57.57%	Catherine Lefebvre; 2,899; 7.18%	Anne-Marie Lavoie; 9,043; 22.41%	Konrad Lamour; 3,204; 7.94%	Payton Ashe; 1,343; 3.33%	Louis Léger; 347; 0.86%	Joseph Di Iorio (Ind.); 212 0.53%	Emmanuel Dubourg
Bourassa	Emmanuel Dubourg; 23,231; 57.57%	Catherine Lefebvre; 2,899; 7.18%	Anne-Marie Lavoie; 9,043; 22.41%	Konrad Lamour; 3,204; 7.94%	Payton Ashe; 1,343; 3.33%	Louis Léger; 347; 0.86%	Françoise Roy (M-L); 72 0.18%	Emmanuel Dubourg
Laval—Les Îles	Fayçal El-Khoury; 26,031; 48.24%	Tom Pentefountas; 8,816; 16.34%	Nacera Beddad; 11,120; 20.61%	Noémia Onofre De Lima; 4,803; 8.90%	Sari Madi; 2,306; 4.27%	Marie-Louise Beauchamp; 885; 1.64%		Fayçal El-Khoury
Marc-Aurèle-Fortin	Yves Robillard; 24,865; 44.55%	Sonia Baudelot; 5,423; 9.72%	Lizabel Nitoi; 18,069; 32.37%	Ali Faour; 4,741; 8.49%	Bao Tran Le; 2,111; 3.78%	Emilio Migliozzi; 465; 0.83%	Elias Progakis (Ind.); 143; 0.26%	Yves Robillard
Papineau	**Justin Trudeau**; 25,957; 51.12%	Sophie Veilleux; 2,155; 4.24%	Christian Gagnon; 8,124; 16.00%	Christine Paré; 9,748; 19.20%	Juan Vazquez; 3,741; 7.37%	Mark Sibthorpe; 322; 0.63%	Jean-Patrick Cacereco Berthiaume (Rhino.); 363 0.71%	Justin Trudeau
Papineau	**Justin Trudeau**; 25,957; 51.12%	Sophie Veilleux; 2,155; 4.24%	Christian Gagnon; 8,124; 16.00%	Christine Paré; 9,748; 19.20%	Juan Vazquez; 3,741; 7.37%	Mark Sibthorpe; 322; 0.63%	Susanne Lefebvre (CHP); 186 0.37%	Justin Trudeau
Papineau	**Justin Trudeau**; 25,957; 51.12%	Sophie Veilleux; 2,155; 4.24%	Christian Gagnon; 8,124; 16.00%	Christine Paré; 9,748; 19.20%	Juan Vazquez; 3,741; 7.37%	Mark Sibthorpe; 322; 0.63%	Luc Lupien (NA); 75 0.15%	Justin Trudeau
Papineau	**Justin Trudeau**; 25,957; 51.12%	Sophie Veilleux; 2,155; 4.24%	Christian Gagnon; 8,124; 16.00%	Christine Paré; 9,748; 19.20%	Juan Vazquez; 3,741; 7.37%	Mark Sibthorpe; 322; 0.63%	Alain Magnan (Ind.); 76 0.16%	Justin Trudeau
Papineau	**Justin Trudeau**; 25,957; 51.12%	Sophie Veilleux; 2,155; 4.24%	Christian Gagnon; 8,124; 16.00%	Christine Paré; 9,748; 19.20%	Juan Vazquez; 3,741; 7.37%	Mark Sibthorpe; 322; 0.63%	Steve Penner (NA); 34 0.07%	Justin Trudeau
Saint-Léonard—Saint-Michel	Patricia Lattanzio; 27,866; 61.33%	Ilario Maiolo; 5,423; 11.94%	Dominique Mougin; 4,351; 9.58%	Paulina Ayala; 2,964; 6.52%	Alessandra Szilagyi; 1,183; 2.60%	Tina Di Serio; 501; 1.10%	Garnet Colly (M-L); 85 0.19%	vacant
Saint-Léonard—Saint-Michel	Patricia Lattanzio; 27,866; 61.33%	Ilario Maiolo; 5,423; 11.94%	Dominique Mougin; 4,351; 9.58%	Paulina Ayala; 2,964; 6.52%	Alessandra Szilagyi; 1,183; 2.60%	Tina Di Serio; 501; 1.10%	Hassan Guillet (Ind.); 3,061 6.74%	vacant
Vimy	Annie Koutrakis; 26,490; 47.70%	Rima El-Helou; 5,951; 10.72%	Claire-Emmanuelle Beaulieu; 15,455; 27.83%	Vassif Aliev; 4,779; 8.61%	Faiza R'Guiba; 2,125; 3.83%	Suzanne Brunelle; 733; 1.32%		Eva Nassif†

==== Laurentides, Outaouais and Northern Quebec ====
Electoral district	Candidates							Incumbent
Electoral district	Liberal	Conservative	BQ	NDP	Green	PPC	Other	Incumbent
Abitibi—Baie-James—Nunavik—Eeyou	Isabelle Bergeron; 8,963; 28.31%	Martin Ferron; 5,240; 16.55%	Sylvie Bérubé; 11,432; 36.11%	Jacline Rouleau; 4,104; 12.96%	Kiara Cabana-Whiteley; 1,151; 3.64%	Guillaume Lanouette; 379; 1.20%	Daniel Simon (Mar.); 387; 1.22%	Romeo Saganash†
Abitibi—Témiscamingue	Claude Thibault; 12,417; 24.76%	Mario Provencher; 7,537; 15.03%	Sébastien Lemire; 22,803; 45.47%	Alain Guimond; 5,093; 10.15%	Aline Bégin; 1,818; 3.62%	Jacques Girard; 487; 0.97%		Christine Moore†
Argenteuil—La Petite-Nation	Stéphane Lauzon; 18,896; 37.79%	Marie Louis-Seize; 6,044; 12.09%	Yves Destroismaisons; 18,167; 36.34%	Charlotte Boucher Smoley; 3,758; 7.52%	Marjorie Valiquette; 2,411; 4.82%	Sherwin Edwards; 721; 1.44%		Stéphane Lauzon
Gatineau	Steven MacKinnon; 29,084; 52.14%	Sylvie Goneau; 5,745; 10.30%	Geneviève Nadeau; 11,926; 21.38%	Eric Chaurette; 6,128; 10.99%	Guy Dostaler; 2,264; 4.06%	Mario-Roberto Lam; 560; 1.00%	Pierre Soublière (M-L); 76; 0.14%	Steven MacKinnon
Hull—Aylmer	Greg Fergus; 29,732; 54.07%	Mike Duggan; 4,979; 9.05%	Joanie Riopel; 8,011; 14.57%	Nicolas Thibodeau; 7,467; 13.58%	Josée Poirier Defoy; 3,869; 7.04%	Rowen Tanguay; 638; 1.16%	Alexandre Deschênes (M-L); 102 0.19%	Greg Fergus
Hull—Aylmer	Greg Fergus; 29,732; 54.07%	Mike Duggan; 4,979; 9.05%	Joanie Riopel; 8,011; 14.57%	Nicolas Thibodeau; 7,467; 13.58%	Josée Poirier Defoy; 3,869; 7.04%	Rowen Tanguay; 638; 1.16%	Sébastien Grenier (Rhino.); 195 0.35%	Greg Fergus
Laurentides—Labelle	David Graham; 21,655; 33.11%	Serge Grégoire; 4,983; 7.62%	Marie-Hélène Gaudreau; 30,625; 46.82%	Claude Dufour; 4,122; 6.30%	Gaël Chantrel; 3,157; 4.83%	Richard Evanko; 418; 0.64%	Michel Leclerc (Ind.); 174 0.27%	David Graham
Laurentides—Labelle	David Graham; 21,655; 33.11%	Serge Grégoire; 4,983; 7.62%	Marie-Hélène Gaudreau; 30,625; 46.82%	Claude Dufour; 4,122; 6.30%	Gaël Chantrel; 3,157; 4.83%	Richard Evanko; 418; 0.64%	Ludovic Schneider (Rhino.); 272 0.42%	David Graham
Mirabel	Karl Trudel; 16,162; 24.85%	François Desrochers; 5,940; 9.13%	Simon Marcil; 33,219; 51.08%	Anne-Marie Saint-Germain; 5,219; 8.03%	Julie Tremblay; 3,517; 5.41%	Christian Montpetit; 641; 0.99%	Pietro Biacchi (PIQ); 332; 0.51%	Simon Marcil
Pontiac	William Amos; 30,217; 48.86%	Dave Blackburn; 10,416; 16.84%	Jonathan Carreiro-Benoit; 9,929; 16.05%	Denise Giroux; 6,503; 10.51%	Claude Bertrand; 3,762; 6.08%	Mario Belec; 775; 1.25%	Louis Lang (M-L); 51 0.08%	Will Amos
Pontiac	William Amos; 30,217; 48.86%	Dave Blackburn; 10,416; 16.84%	Jonathan Carreiro-Benoit; 9,929; 16.05%	Denise Giroux; 6,503; 10.51%	Claude Bertrand; 3,762; 6.08%	Mario Belec; 775; 1.25%	Shawn Stewart (VCP); 194 0.31%	Will Amos
Rivière-des-Mille-Îles	Linda Lapointe; 21,009; 36.11%	Maikel Mikhael; 4,684; 8.05%	Luc Desilets; 23,629; 40.61%	Joseph Hakizimana; 5,002; 8.60%	Ceylan Borgers; 3,015; 5.18%	Hans Roker Jr; 845; 1.45%		Linda Lapointe
Rivière-du-Nord	Florence Gagnon; 13,402; 22.30%	Sylvie Fréchette; 7,120; 11.85%	Rhéal Fortin; 31,281; 52.05%	Myriam Ouellette; 4,194; 6.98%	Joey Leckman; 3,345; 5.57%	Normand Michaud; 407; 0.68%	Nicolas Riqueur-Lainé (PIQ); 225 0.37%	Rhéal Fortin
Rivière-du-Nord	Florence Gagnon; 13,402; 22.30%	Sylvie Fréchette; 7,120; 11.85%	Rhéal Fortin; 31,281; 52.05%	Myriam Ouellette; 4,194; 6.98%	Joey Leckman; 3,345; 5.57%	Normand Michaud; 407; 0.68%	Lucie St-Gelais (Ind.); 127 0.21%	Rhéal Fortin
Terrebonne	Frédéric Beauchemin; 17,944; 29.26%	France Gagnon; 4,640; 7.57%	Michel Boudrias; 31,029; 50.59%	Maxime Beaudoin; 4,627; 7.54%	Réjean Monette; 2,277; 3.71%	Jeffrey Barnes; 399; 0.65%	Jade Hébert (Ind.); 159 0.28%	Michel Boudrias
Terrebonne	Frédéric Beauchemin; 17,944; 29.26%	France Gagnon; 4,640; 7.57%	Michel Boudrias; 31,029; 50.59%	Maxime Beaudoin; 4,627; 7.54%	Réjean Monette; 2,277; 3.71%	Jeffrey Barnes; 399; 0.65%	Paul Vézina (Rhino.); 260 0.42%	Michel Boudrias
Thérèse-De Blainville	Ramez Ayoub; 20,988; 35.85%	Marie Claude Fournier; 5,264; 8.99%	Louise Chabot; 24,486; 41.82%	Hannah Wolker; 4,431; 7.57%	Normand Beaudet; 2,710; 4.63%	Désiré Mounanga; 366; 0.63%	Alain Lamontagne (Rhino.); 215 0.37%	Ramez Ayoub
Thérèse-De Blainville	Ramez Ayoub; 20,988; 35.85%	Marie Claude Fournier; 5,264; 8.99%	Louise Chabot; 24,486; 41.82%	Hannah Wolker; 4,431; 7.57%	Normand Beaudet; 2,710; 4.63%	Désiré Mounanga; 366; 0.63%	Andy Piano (Ind.); 89 0.15%	Ramez Ayoub

=== Ontario ===
==== Ottawa ====
Electoral district	Candidates							Incumbent
Electoral district	Liberal	Conservative	NDP	Green	PPC	Communist	Other	Incumbent
Carleton	Chris Rodgers; 26,518; 38.23%	Pierre Poilievre; 32,147; 46.35%	Kevin Hua; 6,479; 9.34%	Gordon Kubanek; 3,423; 4.94%	Alain Musende; 792; 1.14%			Pierre Poilievre
Kanata—Carleton	Karen McCrimmon; 28,746; 43.05%	Justina McCaffrey; 24,361; 36.48%	Melissa Coenraad; 8,317; 12.46%	Jennifer Purdy; 4,387; 6.57%	Scott Miller; 961; 1.44%			Karen McCrimmon
Nepean	Chandra Arya; 31,933; 45.89%	Brian St. Louis; 23,320; 33.51%	Zaff Ansari; 9,104; 13.08%	Jean-Luc Cooke; 4,379; 6.29%	Azim Hooda; 687; 0.99%	Dustan Wang; 160; 0.23%		Chandra Arya
Orléans	Marie-France Lalonde; 44,183; 54.27%	David Bertschi; 22,984; 28.23%	Jacqui Wiens; 9,428; 11.58%	Michelle Petersen; 3,829; 4.70%	Roger Saint-Fleur; 986; 1.21%			Andrew Leslie†$
Ottawa Centre	Catherine McKenna; 38,391; 48.66%	Carol Clemenhagen; 9,920; 12.57%	Emilie Taman; 22,916; 29.04%	Angela Keller-Herzog; 5,837; 7.40%	Merylee Sevilla; 720; 0.91%	Stuart Ryan; 111; 0.14%	Shelby Bertrand (Animal); 207 0.26%	Catherine McKenna
Ottawa Centre	Catherine McKenna; 38,391; 48.66%	Carol Clemenhagen; 9,920; 12.57%	Emilie Taman; 22,916; 29.04%	Angela Keller-Herzog; 5,837; 7.40%	Merylee Sevilla; 720; 0.91%	Stuart Ryan; 111; 0.14%	Coreen Corcoran (Libert.); 360 0.46%	Catherine McKenna
Ottawa Centre	Catherine McKenna; 38,391; 48.66%	Carol Clemenhagen; 9,920; 12.57%	Emilie Taman; 22,916; 29.04%	Angela Keller-Herzog; 5,837; 7.40%	Merylee Sevilla; 720; 0.91%	Stuart Ryan; 111; 0.14%	Chris G Jones (Ind.); 177 0.22%	Catherine McKenna
Ottawa Centre	Catherine McKenna; 38,391; 48.66%	Carol Clemenhagen; 9,920; 12.57%	Emilie Taman; 22,916; 29.04%	Angela Keller-Herzog; 5,837; 7.40%	Merylee Sevilla; 720; 0.91%	Stuart Ryan; 111; 0.14%	Marie-Chantal Leriche (CHP); 198 0.25%	Catherine McKenna
Ottawa Centre	Catherine McKenna; 38,391; 48.66%	Carol Clemenhagen; 9,920; 12.57%	Emilie Taman; 22,916; 29.04%	Angela Keller-Herzog; 5,837; 7.40%	Merylee Sevilla; 720; 0.91%	Stuart Ryan; 111; 0.14%	Giang Ha Thu Vo (Ind.); 65 0.08%	Catherine McKenna
Ottawa South	David McGuinty; 34,205; 52.32%	Eli Tannis; 16,025; 24.51%	Morgan Gay; 10,457; 16.00%	Les Schram; 3,645; 5.58%	Rodrigo André Bolaños; 717; 1.10%	Larry Wasslen; 99; 0.15%	Ahmed Bouragba (Ind.); 141 0.22%	David McGuinty
Ottawa South	David McGuinty; 34,205; 52.32%	Eli Tannis; 16,025; 24.51%	Morgan Gay; 10,457; 16.00%	Les Schram; 3,645; 5.58%	Rodrigo André Bolaños; 717; 1.10%	Larry Wasslen; 99; 0.15%	Sarmad Laith (Ind.); 87 0.13%	David McGuinty
Ottawa—Vanier	Mona Fortier; 32,679; 51.16%	Joel E. Bernard; 11,118; 17.40%	Stéphanie Mercier; 13,516; 21.16%	Oriana Ngabirano; 4,796; 7.51%	Paul Durst; 1,064; 1.67%	Michelle Paquette; 115; 0.18%	Joel Altman (Ind.); 211 0.33%	Mona Fortier
Ottawa—Vanier	Mona Fortier; 32,679; 51.16%	Joel E. Bernard; 11,118; 17.40%	Stéphanie Mercier; 13,516; 21.16%	Oriana Ngabirano; 4,796; 7.51%	Paul Durst; 1,064; 1.67%	Michelle Paquette; 115; 0.18%	Christian Legeais (M-L); 59 0.09%	Mona Fortier
Ottawa—Vanier	Mona Fortier; 32,679; 51.16%	Joel E. Bernard; 11,118; 17.40%	Stéphanie Mercier; 13,516; 21.16%	Oriana Ngabirano; 4,796; 7.51%	Paul Durst; 1,064; 1.67%	Michelle Paquette; 115; 0.18%	Daniel James McHugh (Ind.); 94 0.15%	Mona Fortier
Ottawa—Vanier	Mona Fortier; 32,679; 51.16%	Joel E. Bernard; 11,118; 17.40%	Stéphanie Mercier; 13,516; 21.16%	Oriana Ngabirano; 4,796; 7.51%	Paul Durst; 1,064; 1.67%	Michelle Paquette; 115; 0.18%	Derek Miller (Rhino.); 229 0.36%	Mona Fortier
Ottawa West—Nepean	Anita Vandenbeld; 28,378; 45.62%	Abdul Abdi; 16,876; 27.13%	Angella MacEwen; 11,646; 18.72%	David Stibbe; 3,894; 6.26%	Serguei Guevorkian; 839; 1.35%	Vincent Cama; 103; 0.17%	Nick Lin (M-L); 48 0.08%	Anita Vandenbeld
Ottawa West—Nepean	Anita Vandenbeld; 28,378; 45.62%	Abdul Abdi; 16,876; 27.13%	Angella MacEwen; 11,646; 18.72%	David Stibbe; 3,894; 6.26%	Serguei Guevorkian; 839; 1.35%	Vincent Cama; 103; 0.17%	Butch Moore (NA); 71 0.11%	Anita Vandenbeld
Ottawa West—Nepean	Anita Vandenbeld; 28,378; 45.62%	Abdul Abdi; 16,876; 27.13%	Angella MacEwen; 11,646; 18.72%	David Stibbe; 3,894; 6.26%	Serguei Guevorkian; 839; 1.35%	Vincent Cama; 103; 0.17%	Sean Mulligan (CHP); 351 0.56%	Anita Vandenbeld

==== Eastern Ontario ====
Electoral district	Candidates						Incumbent
Electoral district	Liberal	Conservative	NDP	Green	PPC	Other	Incumbent
Bay of Quinte	Neil Ellis; 24,099; 39.16%	Tim Durkin; 22,650; 36.80%	Stephanie Bell; 9,851; 16.01%	Danny Celovsky; 3,740; 6.08%	Paul Bordonaro; 1,207; 1.96%		Neil Ellis
Glengarry—Prescott—Russell	Francis Drouin; 31,293; 47.56%	Pierre Lemieux; 23,660; 35.96%	Konstantine Malakos; 6,851; 10.41%	Marthe Lépine (Note: Lépine was ejected from the party on 6 October; she still appeared on the ballot as representing the Green Party because the candidate registration deadline had already passed.); 2,113; 3.21%	Jean-Jacques Desgranges; 1,174; 1.78%	Darcy Neal Donnelly (Libert.); 262 0.40%	Francis Drouin
Glengarry—Prescott—Russell	Francis Drouin; 31,293; 47.56%	Pierre Lemieux; 23,660; 35.96%	Konstantine Malakos; 6,851; 10.41%	Marthe Lépine; 2,113; 3.21%	Jean-Jacques Desgranges; 1,174; 1.78%	Daniel John Fey (Ind.); 239 0.36%	Francis Drouin
Glengarry—Prescott—Russell	Francis Drouin; 31,293; 47.56%	Pierre Lemieux; 23,660; 35.96%	Konstantine Malakos; 6,851; 10.41%	Marthe Lépine; 2,113; 3.21%	Jean-Jacques Desgranges; 1,174; 1.78%	Marc-Antoine Gagnier (Rhino.); 199 0.30%	Francis Drouin
Hastings—Lennox and Addington	Mike Bossio; 19,721; 37.14%	Derek Sloan; 21,968; 41.38%	David Tough; 6,984; 13.15%	Sari Watson; 3,114; 5.87%	Adam L. E. Gray; 1,307; 2.46%		Mike Bossio
Kingston and the Islands	Mark Gerretsen; 31,205; 45.76%	Ruslan Yakoviychuk; 13,304; 19.51%	Barrington Walker; 15,856; 23.25%	Candice Christmas; 6,059; 8.89%	Andy Brooke; 1,769; 2.59%		Mark Gerretsen
Lanark—Frontenac—Kingston	Kayley Kennedy; 15,441; 24.71%	Scott Reid; 30,077; 48.14%	Satinka Schilling; 8,835; 14.14%	Stephen Kotze; 7,011; 11.22%	Matthew Barton; 1,117; 1.79%		Scott Reid
Leeds—Grenville—Thousand Islands and Rideau Lakes	Josh Bennett; 15,482; 26.49%	Michael Barrett; 28,630; 48.98%	Michelle Taylor; 8,201; 14.03%	Lorraine Rekmans; 5,152; 8.81%	Evan Hindle; 988; 1.69%		Michael Barrett
Renfrew—Nipissing—Pembroke	Ruben Marini; 11,532; 19.56%	Cheryl Gallant; 31,080; 52.72%	Eileen Jones-Whyte; 8,786; 14.90%	Ian Pineau; 3,230; 5.48%	David Ainsworth; 1,463; 2.48%	Robert Cherrin (VCP); 358 0.61%	Cheryl Gallant
Renfrew—Nipissing—Pembroke	Ruben Marini; 11,532; 19.56%	Cheryl Gallant; 31,080; 52.72%	Eileen Jones-Whyte; 8,786; 14.90%	Ian Pineau; 3,230; 5.48%	David Ainsworth; 1,463; 2.48%	Dan Criger (Ind.); 1,125 1.91%	Cheryl Gallant
Renfrew—Nipissing—Pembroke	Ruben Marini; 11,532; 19.56%	Cheryl Gallant; 31,080; 52.72%	Eileen Jones-Whyte; 8,786; 14.90%	Ian Pineau; 3,230; 5.48%	David Ainsworth; 1,463; 2.48%	Jonathan Davis (Ind.); 200 0.34%	Cheryl Gallant
Renfrew—Nipissing—Pembroke	Ruben Marini; 11,532; 19.56%	Cheryl Gallant; 31,080; 52.72%	Eileen Jones-Whyte; 8,786; 14.90%	Ian Pineau; 3,230; 5.48%	David Ainsworth; 1,463; 2.48%	Dheerendra Kumar (Ind.); 917 1.56%	Cheryl Gallant
Renfrew—Nipissing—Pembroke	Ruben Marini; 11,532; 19.56%	Cheryl Gallant; 31,080; 52.72%	Eileen Jones-Whyte; 8,786; 14.90%	Ian Pineau; 3,230; 5.48%	David Ainsworth; 1,463; 2.48%	Stefan Klietsch (Libert.); 266 0.45%	Cheryl Gallant
Stormont—Dundas—South Glengarry	Heather Megill; 13,767; 25.63%	Eric Duncan; 28,976; 53.95%	Kelsey Catherine Schmitz; 7,674; 14.29%	Raheem Aman; 2,126; 3.96%	Sabile Trimm; 1,168; 2.17%		Guy Lauzon†$

==== Central Ontario ====
Electoral district	Candidates						Incumbent
Electoral district	Liberal	Conservative	NDP	Green	PPC	Other	Incumbent
Barrie—Innisfil	Lisa-Marie Wilson; 15,879; 29.27%	John Brassard; 23,765; 43.80%	Pekka Reinio; 8,880; 16.37%	Bonnie North; 4,716; 8.69%	Stephanie Robinson; 1,013; 1.87%		John Brassard
Barrie—Springwater—Oro-Medonte	Brian Kalliecharan; 16,805; 31.24%	Doug Shipley; 20,981; 39.00%	Dan Janssen; 7,972; 14.82%	Marty Lancaster; 7,066; 13.14%	David Patterson; 969; 1.80%		Alex Nuttall†$
Bruce—Grey—Owen Sound	Michael Den Tandt; 17,485; 29.98%	Alex Ruff; 26,830; 46.22%	Chris Stephen; 6,666; 11.59%	Danielle Valiquette; 5,007; 8.70%	Bill Townsend; 1,702; 2.96%	Daniel Little (Libert.); 316; 0.55%	Larry Miller†$
Dufferin—Caledon	Michele Fisher; 22,645; 33.00%	Kyle Seeback; 28,852; 42.05%	Allison Brown; 7,981; 11.63%	Stefan Wiesen; 7,303; 10.64%	Chad Ransom; 1,516; 2.21%	Russ Emo (CHP); 319; 0.46%	David Tilson†
Haliburton—Kawartha Lakes—Brock	Judi Forbes; 17,067; 25.95%	Jamie Schmale; 32,257; 49.05%	Barbara Doyle; 9,676; 14.71%	Elizabeth Fraser; 5,515; 8.39%	Gene Balfour; 1,245; 1.89%		Jamie Schmale
Northumberland—Peterborough South	Kim Rudd; 24,977; 36.22%	Philip Lawrence; 27,385; 39.71%	Mallory MacDonald; 9,615; 13.94%	Jeff Wheeldon; 5,524; 8.01%	Frank Vaughan; 1,460; 2.12%		Kim Rudd
Peterborough—Kawartha	Maryam Monsef; 27,400; 39.25%	Michael Skinner; 24,357; 34.89%	Candace Shaw; 11,872; 17.01%	Andrew MacGregor; 4,930; 7.06%	Alexander Murphy; 890; 1.28%	Robert M Bowers (Ind.); 180 0.26%	Maryam Monsef
Peterborough—Kawartha	Maryam Monsef; 27,400; 39.25%	Michael Skinner; 24,357; 34.89%	Candace Shaw; 11,872; 17.01%	Andrew MacGregor; 4,930; 7.06%	Alexander Murphy; 890; 1.28%	**Ken Ranney** (SCC); 172 0.25%	Maryam Monsef
Simcoe—Grey	Lorne Kenney; 23,925; 31.68%	Terry Dowdall; 32,812; 43.45%	Ilona Matthews; 8,462; 11.21%	Sherri Jackson; 8,589; 11.37%	Richard Sommer; 1,416; 1.88%	Tony D'Angelo (VCP); 305; 0.40%	Kellie Leitch†
Simcoe North	Gerry Hawes; 19,310; 30.76%	Bruce Stanton; 27,241; 43.39%	Angelique Belcourt; 8,850; 14.10%	Valerie Powell; 5,882; 9.37%	Stephen Makk; 1,154; 1.84%	Chris Brown (CHP); 341; 0.54%	Bruce Stanton
York—Simcoe	Cynthia Wesley-Esquimaux; 14,407; 26.79%	Scot Davidson; 24,918; 46.33%	Jessa McLean; 7,620; 14.17%	Jonathan Arnold; 4,650; 8.65%	Michael Lotter; 875; 1.63%	Keith Komar (Libert.); 1,311; 2.44%	Scot Davidson

==== Durham and York ====
Electoral district	Candidates						Incumbent
Electoral district	Liberal	Conservative	NDP	Green	PPC	Other	Incumbent
Ajax	Mark Holland; 35,198; 57.68%	Tom Dingwall; 15,864; 26.00%	Shokat Malik; 7,033; 11.53%	Maia Knight; 2,040; 3.34%	Susanna Russo; 588; 0.96%	Intab Ali (Ind.); 111 0.18%	Mark Holland
Ajax	Mark Holland; 35,198; 57.68%	Tom Dingwall; 15,864; 26.00%	Shokat Malik; 7,033; 11.53%	Maia Knight; 2,040; 3.34%	Susanna Russo; 588; 0.96%	Allen Keith Hadley (Ind.); 186 0.30%	Mark Holland
Aurora—Oak Ridges—Richmond Hill	Leah Taylor Roy; 22,508; 42.38%	Leona Alleslev; 23,568; 44.38%	Aaron Brown; 3,820; 7.19%	Timothy Flemming; 2,154; 4.06%	Priya Patil; 530; 1.00%	Serge Korovitsyn (Libert.); 529; 1.00%	Leona Alleslev (Note: Leona Alleslev was announced as the Liberal candidate in July 2018 but crossed the floor to join the Conservatives in September of that year.)
Durham	Jonathan Giancroce; 23,547; 32.25%	Erin O'Toole; 30,752; 42.12%	Sarah Whalen-Wright; 13,323; 18.25%	Evan Price; 3,950; 5.41%	Brenda Virtue; 1,442; 1.97%		Erin O'Toole
King—Vaughan	Deb Schulte; 28,725; 44.99%	Anna Roberts; 27,584; 43.20%	Emilio Bernardo-Ciddio; 4,297; 6.73%	Ann Raney; 2,511; 3.93%	Anton Strgacic; 731; 1.14%		Deb Schulte
Markham—Stouffville	Helena Jaczek; 25,055; 38.91%	Theodore Antony; 19,703; 30.60%	Hal Berman; 4,132; 6.42%	Roy Long; 1,621; 2.52%	Jeremy Lin; 537; 0.83%	Jane Philpott (Ind.); 13,340; 20.72%	Jane Philpott#
Markham—Thornhill	Mary Ng; 24,124; 53.91%	Alex Yuan; 15,474; 34.58%	Paul Sahbaz; 3,264; 7.29%	Chris Williams; 1,253; 2.80%	Peter Remedios; 358; 0.80%	Josephbai Macwan (Ind.); 277; 0.62%	Mary Ng
Markham—Unionville	Alan Ho; 20,484; 38.36%	Bob Saroya; 26,133; 48.94%	Gregory Hines; 3,524; 6.60%	Elvin Kao; 2,394; 4.48%	Sarah Chung; 861; 1.61%		Bob Saroya
Newmarket—Aurora	Tony Van Bynen; 26,488; 43.10%	Lois Brown; 23,252; 37.83%	Yvonne Kelly; 6,576; 10.70%	Walter Bauer; 3,551; 5.78%	Andrew McCaughtrie; 588; 0.96%	Dorian Baxter (PC); 901 1.47%	Kyle Peterson†
Newmarket—Aurora	Tony Van Bynen; 26,488; 43.10%	Lois Brown; 23,252; 37.83%	Yvonne Kelly; 6,576; 10.70%	Walter Bauer; 3,551; 5.78%	Andrew McCaughtrie; 588; 0.96%	Laurie Goble (Rhino.); 104 0.17%	Kyle Peterson†
Oshawa	Afroza Hossain; 15,750; 25.41%	Colin Carrie; 24,087; 38.86%	Shailene Panylo; 17,668; 28.50%	Jovannah Ramsden; 3,151; 5.08%	Eric Mackenzie; 1,215; 1.96%	Jeff Tomlinson (Comm.); 112; 0.18%	Colin Carrie
Pickering—Uxbridge	Jennifer O'Connell; 32,387; 51.01%	Cyma Musarat; 18,462; 29.08%	Eileen Higdon; 7,582; 11.94%	Peter Forint; 3,799; 5.98%	Corneliu Chisu; 1,265; 1.99%		Jennifer O'Connell
Richmond Hill	Majid Jowhari; 21,804; 43.48%	Costas Menegakis; 21,592; 43.06%	Adam DeVita; 4,425; 8.82%	Ichha Kohli; 1,695; 3.38%	Igor Tvorogov; 507; 1.01%	Otto Wevers (Rhino.); 126; 0.25%	Majid Jowhari
Thornhill	Gary Gladstone; 18,946; 35.42%	Peter Kent; 29,187; 54.56%	Sara Petruci; 3,469; 6.48%	Josh Rachlis; 1,600; 2.99%		Nathan Bregman (Rhino.); 217 0.41%	Peter Kent
Thornhill	Gary Gladstone; 18,946; 35.42%	Peter Kent; 29,187; 54.56%	Sara Petruci; 3,469; 6.48%	Josh Rachlis; 1,600; 2.99%		Waseem Malik (CFF); 77 0.14%	Peter Kent
Vaughan—Woodbridge	Francesco Sorbara; 25,810; 51.28%	Teresa Kruze; 18,289; 36.34%	Peter DeVita; 3,910; 7.77%	Raquel Fronte; 1,302; 2.59%	Domenic Montesano; 852; 1.69%	Muhammad Hassan Khan (Ind.); 165; 0.33%	Francesco Sorbara
Whitby	Ryan Turnbull; 30,182; 43.68%	Todd McCarthy; 24,564; 35.55%	Brian Dias; 9,760; 14.12%	Paul Slavchenko; 3,735; 5.41%	Mirko Pejic; 860; 1.24%		Celina Caesar-Chavannes†

==== Suburban Toronto ====
Electoral district	Candidates						Incumbent
Electoral district	Liberal	Conservative	NDP	Green	PPC	Other	Incumbent
Don Valley East	Yasmin Ratansi; 25,295; 59.81%	Michael Ma; 10,115; 23.92%	Nicholas Thompson; 4,647; 10.99%	Dan Turcotte; 1,675; 3.96%	John P. Hendry; 562; 1.33%		Yasmin Ratansi
Don Valley North	Han Dong; 23,495; 50.45%	Sarah Fischer; 16,506; 35.44%	Bruce Griffin; 4,285; 9.20%	Daniel Giavedoni; 1,803; 3.87%	Jay Sobel; 482; 1.03%		Geng Tan†$
Etobicoke Centre	Yvan Baker; 32,800; 51.88%	Ted Opitz; 21,804; 34.49%	Heather Vickers-Wong; 4,881; 7.72%	Cameron Semple; 2,775; 4.39%	Nicholas Serdiuk; 664; 1.05%	Mark Wrzesniewski (Libert.); 295; 0.47%	Borys Wrzesnewskyj†
Etobicoke—Lakeshore	James Maloney; 36,061; 51.88%	Barry O'Brien; 19,952; 28.70%	Branko Gasperlin; 8,277; 11.91%	Chris Caldwell; 4,141; 5.96%	Jude Sulejmani; 921; 1.32%	Janice Murray (M-L); 163; 0.23%	James Maloney
Etobicoke North	Kirsty Duncan; 26,388; 61.44%	Sarabjit Kaur; 9,524; 22.18%	Naiima Farah; 4,654; 10.84%	Nancy Ghuman; 1,080; 2.51%	Renata Ford; 1,196; 2.78%	Sudhir Mehta (CFF); 104; 0.24%	Kirsty Duncan
Humber River—Black Creek	Judy Sgro; 23,187; 61.09%	Iftikhar Choudry; 6,164; 16.24%	Maria Augimeri; 7,198; 18.96%	Mike Schmitz; 804; 2.12%	Ania Krosinska; 402; 1.06%	Christine Nugent (M-L); 89 0.23%	Judy Sgro
Humber River—Black Creek	Judy Sgro; 23,187; 61.09%	Iftikhar Choudry; 6,164; 16.24%	Maria Augimeri; 7,198; 18.96%	Mike Schmitz; 804; 2.12%	Ania Krosinska; 402; 1.06%	Stenneth Smith (UPC); 114 0.30%	Judy Sgro
Scarborough—Agincourt	Jean Yip; 21,115; 50.50%	Sean Hu; 15,492; 37.05%	Larisa Julius; 3,636; 8.70%	Randi Ramdeen; 1,050; 2.51%	Anthony Internicola; 521; 1.25%		Jean Yip
Scarborough Centre	Salma Zahid; 25,695; 55.19%	Irshad Chaudhry; 10,387; 22.31%	Faiz Kamal; 5,452; 11.71%	Dordana Hakimzadah; 1,336; 2.87%	Jeremiah Vijeyaratnam; 1,162; 2.50%	John Cannis (Ind.); 2,524; 5.42%	Salma Zahid
Scarborough-Guildwood	John McKay; 26,123; 61.12%	Quintus Thuraisingham; 9,553; 22.35%	Michelle Spencer; 4,806; 11.24%	Tara McMahon; 1,220; 2.85%	Jigna Jani; 648; 1.52%	Stephen Abara (Ind.); 70 0.16%	John McKay
Scarborough-Guildwood	John McKay; 26,123; 61.12%	Quintus Thuraisingham; 9,553; 22.35%	Michelle Spencer; 4,806; 11.24%	Tara McMahon; 1,220; 2.85%	Jigna Jani; 648; 1.52%	Farhan Alvi (CFF); 55 0.13%	John McKay
Scarborough-Guildwood	John McKay; 26,123; 61.12%	Quintus Thuraisingham; 9,553; 22.35%	Michelle Spencer; 4,806; 11.24%	Tara McMahon; 1,220; 2.85%	Jigna Jani; 648; 1.52%	Kevin Clarke (Ind.); 112 0.26%	John McKay
Scarborough-Guildwood	John McKay; 26,123; 61.12%	Quintus Thuraisingham; 9,553; 22.35%	Michelle Spencer; 4,806; 11.24%	Tara McMahon; 1,220; 2.85%	Jigna Jani; 648; 1.52%	Kathleen Marie Holding (Ind.); 70 0.16%	John McKay
Scarborough-Guildwood	John McKay; 26,123; 61.12%	Quintus Thuraisingham; 9,553; 22.35%	Michelle Spencer; 4,806; 11.24%	Tara McMahon; 1,220; 2.85%	Jigna Jani; 648; 1.52%	Gus Stefanis (CNP); 85 0.20%	John McKay
Scarborough North	Shaun Chen; 20,911; 53.57%	David Kong; 11,838; 30.33%	Yan Chen; 5,039; 12.91%	Avery Velez; 796; 2.04%	Jude Guerrier; 370; 0.95%	Janet Robinson (UPC); 83; 0.21%	Shaun Chen
Scarborough—Rouge Park	Gary Anandasangaree; 31,360; 62.19%	Bobby Singh; 10,115; 20.06%	Kingsley Kwok; 5,801; 11.50%	Jessica Hamilton; 2,330; 4.62%	Dilano Sally; 467; 0.93%	Mark Theodoru (CHP); 353; 0.70%	Gary Anandasangaree
Scarborough Southwest	Bill Blair; 28,965; 57.20%	Kimberly Fawcett Smith; 10,502; 20.74%	Keith McCrady; 7,865; 15.53%	Amanda Cain; 2,477; 4.89%	Italo Erastostene; 590; 1.17%	Simon Luisi (Animal); 236; 0.47%	Bill Blair
Willowdale	Ali Ehsassi; 22,282; 49.00%	Daniel Lee; 16,452; 36.18%	Leah Kalsi; 4,231; 9.31%	Sharolyn Vettese; 1,671; 3.67%	Richard Hillier; 563; 1.24%	Birinder Singh Ahluwalia (Ind.); 200 0.44%	Ali Ehsassi
Willowdale	Ali Ehsassi; 22,282; 49.00%	Daniel Lee; 16,452; 36.18%	Leah Kalsi; 4,231; 9.31%	Sharolyn Vettese; 1,671; 3.67%	Richard Hillier; 563; 1.24%	Shodja Ziaian (Ind.); 71 0.16%	Ali Ehsassi
York Centre	Michael Levitt; 21,680; 50.20%	Rachel Willson; 15,852; 36.71%	Andrea Vásquez Jiménez; 4,251; 9.84%	Rebecca Wood; 1,403; 3.25%			Michael Levitt

==== Central Toronto ====
Electoral district	Candidates						Incumbent
Electoral district	Liberal	Conservative	NDP	Green	PPC	Other	Incumbent
Beaches—East York	Nathaniel Erskine-Smith; 32,647; 57.20%	Nadirah Nazeer; 8,026; 14.06%	Mae J. Nam; 12,196; 21.37%	Sean Manners; 3,378; 5.92%	Deborah McKenzie; 831; 1.46%		Nathaniel Erskine-Smith
Davenport	Julie Dzerowicz; 23,251; 43.72%	Sanjay Bhatia; 4,921; 9.25%	Andrew Cash; 21,812; 41.02%	Hannah Conover-Arthurs; 2,397; 4.51%	Francesco Ciardullo; 496; 0.93%	Chai Kalevar (Ind.); 79 0.15%	Julie Dzerowicz
Davenport	Julie Dzerowicz; 23,251; 43.72%	Sanjay Bhatia; 4,921; 9.25%	Andrew Cash; 21,812; 41.02%	Hannah Conover-Arthurs; 2,397; 4.51%	Francesco Ciardullo; 496; 0.93%	**Elizabeth Rowley** (Comm.); 138 0.26%	Julie Dzerowicz
Davenport	Julie Dzerowicz; 23,251; 43.72%	Sanjay Bhatia; 4,921; 9.25%	Andrew Cash; 21,812; 41.02%	Hannah Conover-Arthurs; 2,397; 4.51%	Francesco Ciardullo; 496; 0.93%	Troy Young (Ind.); 86 0.16%	Julie Dzerowicz
Don Valley West	Rob Oliphant; 29,148; 55.80%	Yvonne Robertson; 16,304; 31.21%	Laurel MacDowell; 3,804; 7.28%	Amanda Kistindey; 2,257; 4.32%	Ian Prittie; 444; 0.85%	John Kittredge (Libert.); 277; 0.53%	Rob Oliphant
Eglinton—Lawrence	Marco Mendicino; 29,850; 53.30%	Chani Aryeh-Bain; 18,549; 33.12%	Alexandra Nash; 4,741; 8.47%	Reuben DeBoer; 2,278; 4.07%	Michael Staffieri; 586; 1.05%		Marco Mendicino
Parkdale—High Park	Arif Virani; 28,852; 47.39%	Adam Pham; 8,015; 13.16%	Paul Taylor; 19,180; 31.50%	Nick Capra; 3,916; 6.43%	Greg Wycliffe; 643; 1.06%	Lorne Gershuny (M-L); 43 0.07%	Arif Virani
Parkdale—High Park	Arif Virani; 28,852; 47.39%	Adam Pham; 8,015; 13.16%	Paul Taylor; 19,180; 31.50%	Nick Capra; 3,916; 6.43%	Greg Wycliffe; 643; 1.06%	Alykhan Pabani (Comm.); 119 0.20%	Arif Virani
Parkdale—High Park	Arif Virani; 28,852; 47.39%	Adam Pham; 8,015; 13.16%	Paul Taylor; 19,180; 31.50%	Nick Capra; 3,916; 6.43%	Greg Wycliffe; 643; 1.06%	Terry Parker (Mar.); 119 0.20%	Arif Virani
Spadina—Fort York	Adam Vaughan; 33,822; 55.77%	Frank Fang; 10,680; 17.61%	Diana Yoon; 12,188; 20.10%	Dean Maher; 3,174; 5.23%	Robert Stewart; 672; 1.11%	Marcela Ramirez (Ind.); 114; 0.19%	Adam Vaughan
Toronto Centre	Bill Morneau; 31,271; 57.37%	Ryan Lester; 6,613; 12.13%	Brian Chang; 12,142; 22.27%	Annamie Paul; 3,852; 7.07%		Sean Carson (Rhino.); 147 0.27%	Bill Morneau
Toronto Centre	Bill Morneau; 31,271; 57.37%	Ryan Lester; 6,613; 12.13%	Brian Chang; 12,142; 22.27%	Annamie Paul; 3,852; 7.07%		Bronwyn Cragg (Comm.); 125 0.23%	Bill Morneau
Toronto Centre	Bill Morneau; 31,271; 57.37%	Ryan Lester; 6,613; 12.13%	Brian Chang; 12,142; 22.27%	Annamie Paul; 3,852; 7.07%		Philip Fernandez (M-L); 54 0.10%	Bill Morneau
Toronto Centre	Bill Morneau; 31,271; 57.37%	Ryan Lester; 6,613; 12.13%	Brian Chang; 12,142; 22.27%	Annamie Paul; 3,852; 7.07%		Rob Lewin (Animal); 182 0.33%	Bill Morneau
Toronto Centre	Bill Morneau; 31,271; 57.37%	Ryan Lester; 6,613; 12.13%	Brian Chang; 12,142; 22.27%	Annamie Paul; 3,852; 7.07%		Jason Tavares (Ind.); 126 0.23%	Bill Morneau
Toronto—Danforth	Julie Dabrusin; 27,681; 47.68%	Zia Choudhary; 6,091; 10.49%	Min Sook Lee; 19,283; 33.21%	Chris Tolley; 3,761; 6.48%	Tara Dos Remedios; 621; 1.07%	Elizabeth Abbott (Animal); 261 0.45%	Julie Dabrusin
Toronto—Danforth	Julie Dabrusin; 27,681; 47.68%	Zia Choudhary; 6,091; 10.49%	Min Sook Lee; 19,283; 33.21%	Chris Tolley; 3,761; 6.48%	Tara Dos Remedios; 621; 1.07%	Ivan Byard (Comm.); 151 0.26%	Julie Dabrusin
Toronto—Danforth	Julie Dabrusin; 27,681; 47.68%	Zia Choudhary; 6,091; 10.49%	Min Sook Lee; 19,283; 33.21%	Chris Tolley; 3,761; 6.48%	Tara Dos Remedios; 621; 1.07%	John Kladitis (Ind.); 210 0.36%	Julie Dabrusin
Toronto—St. Paul's	Carolyn Bennett; 32,494; 54.31%	Jae Truesdell; 12,933; 21.61%	Alok Mukherjee; 9,442; 15.78%	Sarah Climenhaga; 4,042; 6.76%	John Kellen; 923; 1.54%		Carolyn Bennett
University—Rosedale	Chrystia Freeland; 29,652; 51.67%	Helen-Claire Tingling; 9,342; 16.28%	Melissa Jean-Baptiste Vajda; 12,573; 21.91%	Tim Grant; 4,861; 8.47%	Aran Lockwood; 510; 0.89%	Karin Brothers (SCC); 124 0.22%	Chrystia Freeland
University—Rosedale	Chrystia Freeland; 29,652; 51.67%	Helen-Claire Tingling; 9,342; 16.28%	Melissa Jean-Baptiste Vajda; 12,573; 21.91%	Tim Grant; 4,861; 8.47%	Aran Lockwood; 510; 0.89%	Drew Garvie (Comm.); 143 0.25%	Chrystia Freeland
University—Rosedale	Chrystia Freeland; 29,652; 51.67%	Helen-Claire Tingling; 9,342; 16.28%	Melissa Jean-Baptiste Vajda; 12,573; 21.91%	Tim Grant; 4,861; 8.47%	Aran Lockwood; 510; 0.89%	Steve Rutschinski (M-L); 27 0.05%	Chrystia Freeland
University—Rosedale	Chrystia Freeland; 29,652; 51.67%	Helen-Claire Tingling; 9,342; 16.28%	Melissa Jean-Baptiste Vajda; 12,573; 21.91%	Tim Grant; 4,861; 8.47%	Aran Lockwood; 510; 0.89%	**Liz White** (Animal); 159 0.28%	Chrystia Freeland
York South—Weston	Ahmed Hussen; 25,976; 58.42%	Jasveen Rattan; 8,415; 18.93%	Yafet Tewelde; 7,754; 17.44%	Nicki Ward; 1,633; 3.67%	Gerard Racine; 685; 1.54%		Ahmed Hussen

==== Brampton, Mississauga and Oakville ====
Electoral district	Candidates						Incumbent
Electoral district	Liberal	Conservative	NDP	Green	PPC	Other	Incumbent
Brampton Centre	Ramesh Sangha; 18,771; 47.21%	Pawanjit Gosal; 10,696; 26.90%	Jordan Boswell; 7,819; 19.67%	Pauline Thornham; 1,685; 4.24%	Baljit Bawa; 681; 1.71%	David Gershuny (M-L); 106; 0.27%	Ramesh Sangha
Brampton East	Maninder Sidhu; 24,050; 47.39%	Ramona Singh; 12,125; 23.89%	Saranjit Singh; 13,368; 26.34%	Teresa Burgess-Ogilvie; 666; 1.31%	Gaurav Walia; 244; 0.48%	**Partap Dua** (CFF); 89 0.18%	Raj Grewal†#
Brampton East	Maninder Sidhu; 24,050; 47.39%	Ramona Singh; 12,125; 23.89%	Saranjit Singh; 13,368; 26.34%	Teresa Burgess-Ogilvie; 666; 1.31%	Gaurav Walia; 244; 0.48%	Manpreet Othi (Ind.); 211 0.42%	Raj Grewal†#
Brampton North	Ruby Sahota; 25,970; 51.42%	Arpan Khanna; 13,973; 27.67%	Melissa Edwards; 8,533; 16.90%	Norbert D'Costa; 1,516; 3.00%	Keith Frazer; 510; 1.01%		Ruby Sahota
Brampton South	Sonia Sidhu; 24,085; 49.47%	Ramandeep Brar; 13,828; 28.40%	Mandeep Kaur; 7,985; 16.40%	Karen Fraser; 1,926; 3.96%	Rajwinder Ghuman; 354; 0.73%	Mitesh Joshi (CFF); 152 0.31%	Sonia Sidhu
Brampton South	Sonia Sidhu; 24,085; 49.47%	Ramandeep Brar; 13,828; 28.40%	Mandeep Kaur; 7,985; 16.40%	Karen Fraser; 1,926; 3.96%	Rajwinder Ghuman; 354; 0.73%	Wavey Mercer (CHP); 285 0.59%	Sonia Sidhu
Brampton South	Sonia Sidhu; 24,085; 49.47%	Ramandeep Brar; 13,828; 28.40%	Mandeep Kaur; 7,985; 16.40%	Karen Fraser; 1,926; 3.96%	Rajwinder Ghuman; 354; 0.73%	Dagmar Sullivan (M-L); 68 0.14%	Sonia Sidhu
Brampton West	Kamal Khera; 28,743; 53.54%	Murarilal Thapliyal; 12,824; 23.89%	Navjit Kaur; 9,855; 18.36%	Jane Davidson; 1,271; 2.37%	Roger Sampson; 505; 0.94%	Harinderpal Hundal (Comm.); 97 0.18%	Kamal Khera
Brampton West	Kamal Khera; 28,743; 53.54%	Murarilal Thapliyal; 12,824; 23.89%	Navjit Kaur; 9,855; 18.36%	Jane Davidson; 1,271; 2.37%	Roger Sampson; 505; 0.94%	Anjum Malik (CFF); 69 0.13%	Kamal Khera
Brampton West	Kamal Khera; 28,743; 53.54%	Murarilal Thapliyal; 12,824; 23.89%	Navjit Kaur; 9,855; 18.36%	Jane Davidson; 1,271; 2.37%	Roger Sampson; 505; 0.94%	Paul Tannahill (CHP); 319 0.59%	Kamal Khera
Mississauga Centre	Omar Alghabra; 29,974; 55.76%	Milad Mikael; 15,874; 29.53%	Sarah Walji; 5,173; 9.62%	Hugo Reinoso; 1,646; 3.06%	David Micalef; 837; 1.56%	Greg Vezina (Ind.); 252; 0.47%	Omar Alghabra
Mississauga East—Cooksville	Peter Fonseca; 27,923; 53.06%	Wladyslaw Lizon; 17,664; 33.57%	Tom Takacs; 4,643; 8.82%	Maha Rasheed; 1,578; 3.00%	Syed Rizvi; 637; 1.21%	**Anna Di Carlo** (M-L); 178; 0.34%	Peter Fonseca
Mississauga—Erin Mills	Iqra Khalid; 31,181; 53.52%	Hani Tawfilis; 19,050; 32.70%	Salman Tariq; 5,236; 8.99%	Remo Boscarino-Gaetano; 2,147; 3.69%	Hazar Alsabagh; 648; 1.11%		Iqra Khalid
Mississauga—Lakeshore	Sven Spengemann; 29,526; 48.40%	Stella Ambler; 22,740; 37.28%	Adam Laughton; 5,103; 8.37%	Cynthia Trentelman; 2,814; 4.61%	Eugen Vizitiu; 717; 1.18%	**Carlton Darby** (UPC); 99; 0.16%	Sven Spengemann
Mississauga—Malton	Navdeep Bains; 27,890; 57.46%	Tom Varughese; 12,528; 25.81%	Nikki Clarke; 6,103; 12.57%	Christina Porter; 1,251; 2.58%	Tahir Gora; 369; 0.76%	Prudence Buchanan (UPC); 306 0.63%	Navdeep Bains
Mississauga—Malton	Navdeep Bains; 27,890; 57.46%	Tom Varughese; 12,528; 25.81%	Nikki Clarke; 6,103; 12.57%	Christina Porter; 1,251; 2.58%	Tahir Gora; 369; 0.76%	Frank Chilelli (M-L); 90 0.19%	Navdeep Bains
Mississauga—Streetsville	Gagan Sikand; 29,618; 50.40%	Ghada Melek; 19,474; 33.14%	Samir Girguis; 6,036; 10.27%	Chris Hill; 2,688; 4.57%	Thomas McIver; 706; 1.20%	Natalie Spizzirri (Animal); 243; 0.41%	Gagan Sikand
Oakville	Anita Anand; 30,265; 46.28%	Terence Young; 25,561; 39.08%	Jerome Adamo; 4,928; 7.54%	James Elwick; 3,704; 5.66%	JD Meaney; 798; 1.22%	Sushila Pereira (CHP); 145; 0.22%	John Oliver†$
Oakville North—Burlington	Pam Damoff; 33,597; 48.26%	Sean Weir; 26,484; 38.04%	Nicolas Dion; 5,866; 8.43%	Michael Houghton; 2,925; 4.20%	Gilbert Joseph Jubinville; 751; 1.08%		Pam Damoff

==== Hamilton, Burlington and Niagara ====
Electoral district	Candidates						Incumbent
Electoral district	Liberal	Conservative	NDP	Green	PPC	Other	Incumbent
Burlington	Karina Gould; 34,989; 48.61%	Jane Michael; 23,930; 33.24%	Lenaee Dupuis; 7,372; 10.24%	Gareth Williams; 4,750; 6.60%	Peter Smetana; 944; 1.31%		Karina Gould
Flamborough—Glanbrook	Jennifer Stebbing; 22,875; 36.58%	David Sweet; 24,527; 39.22%	Allison Cillis; 10,322; 16.50%	Janet Errygers; 3,833; 6.13%	David Tilden; 982; 1.57%		David Sweet
Hamilton Centre	Jasper Kujavsky; 12,651; 28.67%	Monica Ciriello; 6,341; 14.37%	Matthew Green; 20,368; 46.16%	Jason Lopez; 3,370; 7.64%	Melina Mamone; 833; 1.89%	Gary Duyzer (CHP); 182 0.41%	David Christopherson†
Hamilton Centre	Jasper Kujavsky; 12,651; 28.67%	Monica Ciriello; 6,341; 14.37%	Matthew Green; 20,368; 46.16%	Jason Lopez; 3,370; 7.64%	Melina Mamone; 833; 1.89%	Edward Graydon (Ind.); 134 0.30%	David Christopherson†
Hamilton Centre	Jasper Kujavsky; 12,651; 28.67%	Monica Ciriello; 6,341; 14.37%	Matthew Green; 20,368; 46.16%	Jason Lopez; 3,370; 7.64%	Melina Mamone; 833; 1.89%	Tony Lemma (Ind.); 158 0.36%	David Christopherson†
Hamilton Centre	Jasper Kujavsky; 12,651; 28.67%	Monica Ciriello; 6,341; 14.37%	Matthew Green; 20,368; 46.16%	Jason Lopez; 3,370; 7.64%	Melina Mamone; 833; 1.89%	Nathalie Xian Yi Yan (Ind.); 85 0.19%	David Christopherson†
Hamilton East—Stoney Creek	Bob Bratina; 20,112; 38.57%	Nikki Kaur; 13,130; 25.18%	Nick Milanovic; 14,930; 28.63%	Peter Ormond; 2,902; 5.57%	Charles Crocker; 1,072; 2.06%		Bob Bratina
Hamilton Mountain	Bruno Uggenti; 16,057; 30.33%	Peter Dyakowski; 13,443; 25.39%	Scott Duvall; 19,135; 36.14%	Dave Urquhart; 3,115; 5.88%	Trevor Lee; 760; 1.44%	Jim Enos (CHP); 330 0.62%	Scott Duvall
Hamilton Mountain	Bruno Uggenti; 16,057; 30.33%	Peter Dyakowski; 13,443; 25.39%	Scott Duvall; 19,135; 36.14%	Dave Urquhart; 3,115; 5.88%	Trevor Lee; 760; 1.44%	Richard Plett (Rhino.); 109 0.21%	Scott Duvall
Hamilton West—Ancaster—Dundas	Filomena Tassi; 30,214; 46.55%	Bert Laranjo; 17,340; 26.72%	Yousaf Malik; 11,527; 17.76%	Victoria Galea; 4,770; 7.35%	Daniel Ricottone; 894; 1.38%	Spencer Rocchi (Rhino.); 156; 0.24%	Filomena Tassi
Milton	Adam van Koeverden; 30,882; 51.75%	Lisa Raitt; 21,564; 36.13%	Farina Hassan; 3,851; 6.45%	Eleanor Hayward; 2,769; 4.64%	Percy Dastur; 613; 1.03%		Lisa Raitt
Niagara Centre	Vance Badawey; 20,292; 35.01%	April Jeffs; 17,987; 31.03%	Malcolm Allen; 15,469; 26.69%	Michael Tomaino; 3,054; 5.27%	Andrew Sainz-Nieto; 776; 1.34%	Nic Bylsma (CHP); 308 0.53%	Vance Badawey
Niagara Centre	Vance Badawey; 20,292; 35.01%	April Jeffs; 17,987; 31.03%	Malcolm Allen; 15,469; 26.69%	Michael Tomaino; 3,054; 5.27%	Andrew Sainz-Nieto; 776; 1.34%	Robert Walker (M-L); 77 0.13%	Vance Badawey
Niagara Falls	Andrea Kaiser; 22,690; 32.54%	Tony Baldinelli; 24,751; 35.49%	Brian Barker; 12,566; 18.02%	Sandra O'Connor; 3,404; 4.88%	Alexander Taylor; 968; 1.39%	Tricia O'Connor (CHP); 358 0.51%	Rob Nicholson†$
Niagara Falls	Andrea Kaiser; 22,690; 32.54%	Tony Baldinelli; 24,751; 35.49%	Brian Barker; 12,566; 18.02%	Sandra O'Connor; 3,404; 4.88%	Alexander Taylor; 968; 1.39%	Mike Strange (Ind.); 4,997 7.17%	Rob Nicholson†$
Niagara West	Ian Bingham; 17,429; 32.32%	Dean Allison; 24,447; 45.34%	Nameer Rahman; 6,540; 12.13%	Terry Teather; 3,620; 6.71%	Miles Morton; 869; 1.61%	Harold Jonker (CHP); 1,019; 1.89%	Dean Allison
St. Catharines	Chris Bittle; 24,183; 40.23%	Krystina Waler; 18,978; 31.57%	Dennis Van Meer; 12,431; 20.68%	Travis Mason; 3,695; 6.15%	Allan DeRoo; 826; 1.37%		Chris Bittle

==== Midwestern Ontario ====
Electoral district	Candidates						Incumbent
Electoral district	Liberal	Conservative	NDP	Green	PPC	Other	Incumbent
Brantford—Brant	Danielle Takacs; 20,454; 30.68%	Phil McColeman; 26,849; 40.27%	Sabrina Sawyer; 13,131; 19.70%	Bob Jonkman; 4,257; 6.39%	Dave Wrobel; 1,320; 1.98%	Leslie Bory (Ind.); 115 0.17%	Phil McColeman
Brantford—Brant	Danielle Takacs; 20,454; 30.68%	Phil McColeman; 26,849; 40.27%	Sabrina Sawyer; 13,131; 19.70%	Bob Jonkman; 4,257; 6.39%	Dave Wrobel; 1,320; 1.98%	Jeffrey Gallagher (VCP); 394 0.59%	Phil McColeman
Brantford—Brant	Danielle Takacs; 20,454; 30.68%	Phil McColeman; 26,849; 40.27%	Sabrina Sawyer; 13,131; 19.70%	Bob Jonkman; 4,257; 6.39%	Dave Wrobel; 1,320; 1.98%	John The Engineer Turmel (Ind.); 146 0.22%	Phil McColeman
Cambridge	Bryan May; 22,903; 39.53%	Sunny Attwal; 17,409; 30.05%	Scott Hamilton; 11,177; 19.29%	Michele Braniff; 4,343; 7.50%	David Haskell; 1,872; 3.23%	Manuel Couto (M-L); 76 0.13%	Bryan May
Cambridge	Bryan May; 22,903; 39.53%	Sunny Attwal; 17,409; 30.05%	Scott Hamilton; 11,177; 19.29%	Michele Braniff; 4,343; 7.50%	David Haskell; 1,872; 3.23%	George McMorrow (VCP); 162 0.28%	Bryan May
Guelph	Lloyd Longfield; 30,497; 40.36%	Ashish Sachan; 14,568; 19.28%	Aisha Jahangir; 9,297; 12.30%	Steve Dyck; 19,236; 25.46%	Mark Paralovos; 1,087; 1.44%	Juanita Burnett (Comm.); 166 0.22%	Lloyd Longfield
Guelph	Lloyd Longfield; 30,497; 40.36%	Ashish Sachan; 14,568; 19.28%	Aisha Jahangir; 9,297; 12.30%	Steve Dyck; 19,236; 25.46%	Mark Paralovos; 1,087; 1.44%	Kornelis Klevering (Ind.); 86 0.11%	Lloyd Longfield
Guelph	Lloyd Longfield; 30,497; 40.36%	Ashish Sachan; 14,568; 19.28%	Aisha Jahangir; 9,297; 12.30%	Steve Dyck; 19,236; 25.46%	Mark Paralovos; 1,087; 1.44%	Gordon Truscott (CHP); 498 0.66%	Lloyd Longfield
Guelph	Lloyd Longfield; 30,497; 40.36%	Ashish Sachan; 14,568; 19.28%	Aisha Jahangir; 9,297; 12.30%	Steve Dyck; 19,236; 25.46%	Mark Paralovos; 1,087; 1.44%	Michael Wassilyn (Ind.); 133 0.18%	Lloyd Longfield
Haldimand—Norfolk	Kim Huffman; 14,704; 24.54%	Diane Finley; 28,018; 46.75%	Adrienne Roberts; 9,192; 15.34%	Brooke Martin; 4,878; 8.14%	Bob Forbes; 1,234; 2.06%	Lily Eggink (CHP); 817 1.36%	Diane Finley
Haldimand—Norfolk	Kim Huffman; 14,704; 24.54%	Diane Finley; 28,018; 46.75%	Adrienne Roberts; 9,192; 15.34%	Brooke Martin; 4,878; 8.14%	Bob Forbes; 1,234; 2.06%	Harold Stewart (VCP); 1,083 1.81%	Diane Finley
Huron—Bruce	Allan Thompson; 20,167; 33.13%	Ben Lobb; 29,512; 48.49%	Tony McQuail; 7,421; 12.19%	Nicholas Wendler; 2,665; 4.38%	Kevin M. Klerks; 1,102; 1.81%		Ben Lobb
Kitchener Centre	Raj Saini; 20,316; 36.69%	Stephen Woodworth; 13,191; 23.82%	Andrew Moraga; 6,238; 11.27%	Mike Morrice; 14,394; 25.99%	Patrick Bernier; 1,033; 1.87%	Ellen Papenburg (Animal); 202; 0.36%	Raj Saini
Kitchener—Conestoga	Tim Louis; 20,480; 39.74%	Harold Albrecht; 20,115; 39.03%	Riani De Wet; 5,204; 10.10%	Stephanie Goertz; 4,946; 9.60%	Koltyn Wallar; 790; 1.53%		Harold Albrecht
Kitchener South—Hespeler	Marwan Tabbara; 20,986; 40.18%	Alan Keeso; 17,480; 33.47%	Wasai Rahimi; 6,945; 13.30%	David Weber; 5,671; 10.86%	Joseph Todd; 1,005; 1.92%	Elaine Baetz (M-L); 56 0.11%	Marwan Tabbara
Kitchener South—Hespeler	Marwan Tabbara; 20,986; 40.18%	Alan Keeso; 17,480; 33.47%	Wasai Rahimi; 6,945; 13.30%	David Weber; 5,671; 10.86%	Joseph Todd; 1,005; 1.92%	Matthew Correia (VCP); 90 0.17%	Marwan Tabbara
Oxford	Brendan Knight; 11,745; 19.29%	Dave MacKenzie; 29,310; 48.14%	Matthew Chambers; 12,306; 20.21%	Lisa Birtch-Carriere; 4,770; 7.83%	Wendy Martin; 1,774; 2.91%	Melody Aldred (CHP); 986; 1.62%	Dave MacKenzie
Perth—Wellington	Pirie Mitchell; 15,002; 27.13%	John Nater; 25,622; 46.34%	Geoff Krauter; 8,094; 14.64%	Collan Simmons; 4,949; 8.95%	Roger Fuhr; 894; 1.62%	Irma Devries (CHP); 733; 1.33%	John Nater
Waterloo	Bardish Chagger; 31,085; 48.79%	Jerry Zhang; 15,615; 24.51%	Lori Campbell; 9,710; 15.24%	Kirsten Wright; 6,184; 9.71%	Erika Traub; 1,112; 1.75%		Bardish Chagger
Wellington—Halton Hills	Lesley Barron; 19,777; 28.38%	Michael Chong; 33,044; 47.42%	Andrew Bascombe; 6,499; 9.33%	Ralph Martin; 8,851; 12.70%	Syl Carle; 1,509; 2.17%		Michael Chong

==== Southwestern Ontario ====
Electoral district	Candidates						Incumbent
Electoral district	Liberal	Conservative	NDP	Green	PPC	Other	Incumbent
Chatham-Kent—Leamington	Katie Omstead; 16,899; 31.24%	Dave Epp; 25,359; 46.88%	Tony Walsh; 8,229; 15.21%	Mark Vercouteren; 2,233; 4.13%	John Balagtas; 1,061; 1.96%	Paul Coulbeck (Mar.); 307; 0.57%	Dave Van Kesteren†
Elgin—Middlesex—London	Pam Armstrong; 14,324; 23.20%	Karen Vecchio; 31,026; 50.24%	Bob Hargreaves; 11,019; 17.84%	Ericha Hendel; 3,562; 5.77%	Donald Helkaa; 956; 1.55%	Peter Redecop (CHP); 618 1.00%	Karen Vecchio
Elgin—Middlesex—London	Pam Armstrong; 14,324; 23.20%	Karen Vecchio; 31,026; 50.24%	Bob Hargreaves; 11,019; 17.84%	Ericha Hendel; 3,562; 5.77%	Donald Helkaa; 956; 1.55%	Richard Styve (Libert.); 249 0.40%	Karen Vecchio
Essex	Audrey Festeryga; 12,987; 19.02%	Chris Lewis; 28,274; 41.40%	Tracey Ramsey; 23,603; 34.56%	Jennifer Alderson; 2,173; 3.18%	Bill Capes; 1,251; 1.83%		Tracey Ramsey
Lambton—Kent—Middlesex	Jesse McCormick; 14,814; 25.36%	Lianne Rood; 28,651; 49.05%	Dylan Mclay; 9,355; 16.02%	Anthony Li; 3,463; 5.93%	Bria Atkins; 1,804; 3.09%	Rob Lalande (VCP); 325; 0.56%	Bev Shipley†
London—Fanshawe	Mohamed Hammoud; 14,924; 26.85%	Michael van Holst; 13,770; 24.78%	Lindsay Mathyssen; 22,671; 40.79%	Tom Cull; 2,781; 5.00%	Bela Kosoian; 1,132; 2.04%	Stephen Campbell (Ind.); 297; 0.53%	Irene Mathyssen†
London North Centre	Peter Fragiskatos; 27,247; 42.75%	Sarah Bokhari; 15,066; 23.64%	Dirka Prout; 14,887; 23.36%	Carol Dyck; 4,872; 7.64%	Salim Mansur; 1,532; 2.40%	Clara Sorrenti (Comm.); 137; 0.21%	Peter Fragiskatos
London West	Kate Young; 30,622; 42.96%	Liz Snelgrove; 19,910; 27.93%	Shawna Lewkowitz; 15,220; 21.35%	Mary Ann Hodge; 3,827; 5.37%	Mike Mcmullen; 1,171; 1.64%	Jacques Boudreau (Libert.); 523; 0.73%	Kate Young
Sarnia—Lambton	Carmen Lemieux; 12,041; 20.79%	Marilyn Gladu; 28,623; 49.42%	Adam Kilner; 12,644; 21.83%	Peter Robert Smith; 2,490; 4.30%	Brian Everaert; 1,587; 2.74%	Thomas Laird (CHP); 531; 0.92%	Marilyn Gladu
Windsor—Tecumseh	Irek Kusmierczyk; 19,046; 33.44%	Leo Demarce; 15,851; 27.83%	Cheryl Hardcastle; 18,417; 32.33%	Giovanni Abati; 2,177; 3.82%	Dan Burr; 1,279; 2.25%	Laura Chesnik (M-L); 187; 0.33%	Cheryl Hardcastle
Windsor West	Sandra Pupatello; 18,878; 36.33%	Henry Lau; 9,925; 19.10%	Brian Masse; 20,800; 40.03%	Quinn Hunt; 1,325; 2.55%	Darryl Burrell; 958; 1.84%	Margaret Villamizar (M-L); 76; 0.15%	Brian Masse

==== Northern Ontario ====
Electoral district	Candidates						Incumbent
Electoral district	Liberal	Conservative	NDP	Green	PPC	Other	Incumbent
Algoma—Manitoulin—Kapuskasing	Heather Wilson; 9,879; 24.34%	David Williamson; 10,625; 26.18%	Carol Hughes; 16,883; 41.59%	Max Chapman; 2,192; 5.40%	Dave Delisle; 887; 2.19%	Le Marquis De Marmalade (Rhino.); 125; 0.31%	Carol Hughes
Kenora	Bob Nault; 8,335; 30.00%	Eric Melillo; 9,445; 33.99%	Rudy Turtle; 7,923; 28.51%	Kirsi Ralko; 1,526; 5.49%	Michael Di Pasquale; 388; 1.40%	Kelvin Boucher-Chicago (Ind.); 170; 0.61%	Bob Nault
Nickel Belt	Marc G Serré; 19,046; 38.99%	Aino Laamanen; 10,343; 21.17%	Stef Paquette; 15,656; 32.05%	Casey Lalonde; 2,644; 5.41%	Mikko Paavola; 1,159; 2.37%		Marc Serré
Nipissing—Timiskaming	Anthony Rota; 19,352; 40.55%	Jordy Carr; 12,984; 27.20%	Rob Boulet; 9,784; 20.50%	Alex Gomm; 3,111; 6.52%	Mark King; 2,496; 5.23%		Anthony Rota
Parry Sound-Muskoka	Trisha Cowie; 16,615; 30.40%	Scott Aitchison; 22,845; 41.79%	Tom Young; 6,417; 11.74%	Gord Miller; 8,409; 15.38%		Daniel Predie Jr (Ind.); 377; 0.69%	Tony Clement†#
Sault Ste. Marie	Terry Sheehan; 16,284; 39.05%	Sonny Spina; 13,407; 32.15%	Sara McCleary; 9,459; 22.68%	Geo McLean; 1,809; 4.34%	Amy Zuccato; 741; 1.78%		Terry Sheehan
Sudbury	Paul Lefebvre; 19,643; 40.94%	Pierre St-Amant; 9,864; 20.56%	Beth Mairs; 13,885; 28.94%	Bill Crumplin; 3,225; 6.72%	Sean Paterson; 873; 1.82%	Chanel Lalonde (Animal); 282 0.59%	Paul Lefebvre
Sudbury	Paul Lefebvre; 19,643; 40.94%	Pierre St-Amant; 9,864; 20.56%	Beth Mairs; 13,885; 28.94%	Bill Crumplin; 3,225; 6.72%	Sean Paterson; 873; 1.82%	J. David Popescu (Ind.); 70 0.15%	Paul Lefebvre
Sudbury	Paul Lefebvre; 19,643; 40.94%	Pierre St-Amant; 9,864; 20.56%	Beth Mairs; 13,885; 28.94%	Bill Crumplin; 3,225; 6.72%	Sean Paterson; 873; 1.82%	Charlene Sylvestre (Ind.); 135 0.28%	Paul Lefebvre
Thunder Bay—Rainy River	Marcus Powlowski; 14,498; 35.32%	Linda Rydholm; 12,039; 29.33%	Yuk-Sem Won; 11,944; 29.10%	Amanda Moddejonge; 1,829; 4.46%	Andrew Hartnell; 741; 1.81%		Don Rusnak†$
Thunder Bay—Superior North	Patty Hajdu; 18,502; 42.85%	Frank Pullia; 11,036; 25.56%	Anna Betty Achneepineskum; 9,126; 21.14%	Bruce Hyer; 3,639; 8.43%	Youssef Khanjari; 734; 1.70%	Alexander Vodden (Libert.); 140; 0.32%	Patty Hajdu
Timmins-James Bay	Michelle Boileau; 9,443; 25.70%	Kraymr Grenke; 9,907; 26.97%	Charlie Angus; 14,885; 40.51%	Max Kennedy; 1,257; 3.42%	Renaud Roy; 1,248; 3.40%		Charlie Angus

=== Manitoba ===
==== Rural Manitoba ====
Electoral district	Candidates							Incumbent
Electoral district	Liberal	Conservative	NDP	Green	PPC	Christian Heritage	Independent	Incumbent
Brandon—Souris	Terry Hayward; 4,972; 12.07%	Larry Maguire; 26,148; 63.46%	Ashley Duguay; 5,805; 14.09%	Bill Tiessen; 2,984; 7.24%	Robin Lussier; 691; 1.68%	Rebecca Hein; 280; 0.68%	Robert Eastcott; 107 0.26%	Larry Maguire
Brandon—Souris	Terry Hayward; 4,972; 12.07%	Larry Maguire; 26,148; 63.46%	Ashley Duguay; 5,805; 14.09%	Bill Tiessen; 2,984; 7.24%	Robin Lussier; 691; 1.68%	Rebecca Hein; 280; 0.68%	Vanessa Hamilton; 219 0.53%	Larry Maguire
Churchill—Keewatinook Aski	Judy Klassen; 5,616; 23.71%	Cyara Bird; 4,714; 19.90%	Niki Ashton; 11,919; 50.32%	Ralph McLean; 1,144; 4.83%	Ken Klyne; 294; 1.24%			Niki Ashton
Dauphin—Swan River—Neepawa	Cathy Scofield-Singh; 5,344; 13.17%	Dan Mazier; 26,103; 64.35%	Laverne Lewycky; 5,724; 14.11%	Kate Storey; 2,214; 5.46%	Frank Godon; 711; 1.75%	Jenni Johnson; 470; 1.16%		Robert Sopuck†
Portage—Lisgar	Ken Werbiski; 4,779; 10.71%	Candice Bergen; 31,600; 70.79%	Cindy Friesen; 3,872; 8.67%	Beverley Eert; 2,356; 5.28%	Aaron Archer; 1,169; 2.62%	Jerome Dondo; 860; 1.93%		Candice Bergen
Provencher	Trevor Kirczenow; 6,347; 13.14%	Ted Falk; 31,821; 65.88%	Erin McGee; 6,187; 12.81%	Janine G. Gibson; 2,884; 5.97%	Wayne Sturby; 1,066; 2.21%			Ted Falk
Selkirk—Interlake—Eastman	Detlev Regelsky; 6,003; 12.10%	James Bezan; 31,109; 62.72%	Robert A. Smith; 8,873; 17.89%	Wayne James; 2,934; 5.92%	Ian Kathwaroon; 683; 1.38%			James Bezan

==== Winnipeg ====
Electoral district	Candidates							Incumbent
Electoral district	Liberal	Conservative	NDP	Green	PPC	Christian Heritage	Other	Incumbent
Charleswood—St. James—Assiniboia—Headingley	Doug Eyolfson; 16,398; 35.47%	Marty Morantz; 18,815; 40.70%	Ken St. George; 6,556; 14.18%	Kristin Lauhn-Jensen; 2,178; 4.71%	Steven Fletcher; 1,975; 4.27%	Melissa Penner; 166; 0.36%	Brian Ho (Ind.); 140; 0.30%	Doug Eyolfson
Elmwood—Transcona	Jennifer Malabar; 5,346; 12.33%	Lawrence Toet; 16,240; 37.45%	Daniel Blaikie; 19,786; 45.63%	Kelly Manweiler; 1,480; 3.41%	Noel Gautron; 512; 1.18%			Daniel Blaikie
Kildonan—St. Paul	MaryAnn Mihychuk; 12,356; 27.89%	Raquel Dancho; 19,856; 44.82%	Evan Krosney; 9,387; 21.19%	Rylan Reed; 1,777; 4.01%	Martin Deck; 510; 1.15%	Spencer Katerynuk; 304; 0.69%	Eduard Hiebert (Ind.); 108; 0.24%	MaryAnn Mihychuk
Saint Boniface—Saint Vital	Dan Vandal; 20,300; 42.88%	Rejeanne Caron; 15,436; 32.61%	Billie Cross; 8,037; 16.98%	Ben Linnick; 2,671; 5.64%	Adam McAllister; 591; 1.25%		Sharma Baljeet (Ind.); 303; 0.64%	Dan Vandal
Winnipeg Centre	Robert-Falcon Ouellette; 10,704; 33.74%	Ryan Dyck; 5,561; 17.53%	Leah Gazan; 13,073; 41.21%	Andrea Shalay; 1,661; 5.24%	Yogi Henderson; 474; 1.49%	Stephanie Hein; 251; 0.79%		Robert-Falcon Ouellette
Winnipeg North	Kevin Lamoureux; 15,581; 47.60%	Jordyn Ham; 6,820; 20.83%	Kyle Mason; 8,469; 25.87%	Sai Shanthanand Rajagopal; 906; 2.77%	Victor Ong; 324; 0.99%	Henry Hizon; 279; 0.85%	Kathy Doyle (Ind.); 231 0.71%	Kevin Lamoureux
Winnipeg North	Kevin Lamoureux; 15,581; 47.60%	Jordyn Ham; 6,820; 20.83%	Kyle Mason; 8,469; 25.87%	Sai Shanthanand Rajagopal; 906; 2.77%	Victor Ong; 324; 0.99%	Henry Hizon; 279; 0.85%	Andrew Taylor (Comm.); 125 0.38%	Kevin Lamoureux
Winnipeg South	Terry Duguid; 20,182; 42.14%	Melanie Maher; 18,537; 38.71%	Jean-Paul Lapointe; 6,678; 13.94%	Paul Bettess; 2,073; 4.33%	Mirwais Nasiri; 419; 0.87%			Terry Duguid
Winnipeg South Centre	Jim Carr; 22,799; 45.00%	Joyce Bateman; 15,051; 29.71%	Elizabeth Shearer; 8,965; 17.70%	James Beddome; 3,173; 6.26%	Jane MacDiarmid; 569; 1.12%	Linda Marynuk; 104; 0.21%		Jim Carr

=== Saskatchewan ===
==== Southern Saskatchewan ====
Electoral district	Candidates							Incumbent
Electoral district	Liberal	Conservative	NDP	Green	PPC	Independent	Other	Incumbent
Cypress Hills—Grasslands	William Caton; 1,595; 4.15%	Jeremy Patzer; 31,140; 81.06%	Trevor Peterson; 3,666; 9.54%	Bill Clary; 719; 1.87%	Lee Harding; 1,075; 2.80%	Maria Lewans; 220; 0.57%		David Anderson†$
Moose Jaw—Lake Centre—Lanigan	Cecilia Melanson; 2,517; 5.60%	Tom Lukiwski; 31,993; 71.12%	Talon Regent; 7,660; 17.03%	Gillian Walker; 1,201; 2.67%	Chey Craik; 1,613; 3.59%			Tom Lukiwski
Regina—Lewvan	Winter Fedyk; 6,826; 13.23%	Warren Steinley; 27,088; 52.48%	Jigar Patel; 14,767; 28.61%	Naomi Hunter; 2,099; 4.07%	Trevor Wowk; 573; 1.11%	Don Morgan; 201; 0.39%	Ian Bridges (NCA); 60; 0.12%	Erin Weir†
Regina—Qu'Appelle	Jordan Ames-Sinclair; 4,543; 11.72%	**Andrew Scheer**; 24,463; 63.12%	Ray Aldinger; 7,685; 19.83%	Dale Dewar; 1,282; 3.31%	Tracey Sparrowhawk; 513; 1.32%	Kieran Szuchewycz; 78; 0.20%	Éric Normand (Rhino.); 75 0.19%	Andrew Scheer
Regina—Qu'Appelle	Jordan Ames-Sinclair; 4,543; 11.72%	**Andrew Scheer**; 24,463; 63.12%	Ray Aldinger; 7,685; 19.83%	Dale Dewar; 1,282; 3.31%	Tracey Sparrowhawk; 513; 1.32%	Kieran Szuchewycz; 78; 0.20%	James Plummer (Libert.); 116 0.30%	Andrew Scheer
Regina—Wascana	Ralph Goodale; 15,242; 33.61%	Michael Kram; 22,418; 49.43%	Hailey Clark; 5,801; 12.79%	Tamela Friesen; 1,316; 2.90%	Mario Milanovski; 450; 0.99%	Evangeline Godron; 128; 0.28%		Ralph Goodale
Souris—Moose Mountain	Javin Ames-Sinclair; 1,718; 4.13%	Robert Kitchen; 35,067; 84.40%	Ashlee Hicks; 3,214; 7.74%	Judy Mergel; 681; 1.64%	Phillip Zajac; 702; 1.69%		**Travis Patron** (CNP); 168; 0.40%	Robert Kitchen
Yorkton—Melville	Connor Moen; 2,488; 6.42%	Cathay Wagantall; 29,523; 76.15%	Carter Antoine; 4,747; 12.24%	Stacey Wiebe; 1,070; 2.76%	Ryan Schultz; 941; 2.43%			Cathay Wagantall

==== Northern Saskatchewan ====
Electoral district	Candidates						Incumbent
Electoral district	Liberal	Conservative	NDP	Green	PPC	Other	Incumbent
Battlefords—Lloydminster	Larry Ingram; 2,426; 6.77%	Rosemarie Falk; 28,030; 78.25%	Marcella Pedersen; 4,098; 11.44%	David Kim-Cragg; 605; 1.69%	Jason MacInnis; 662; 1.85%		Rosemarie Falk
Carlton Trail—Eagle Creek	Rebecca Malo; 2,085; 4.64%	Kelly Block; 35,313; 78.56%	Jasmine Calix; 5,535; 12.31%	Dean Gibson; 873; 1.94%	Cody Payant; 799; 1.78%	Glenn Wright (Ind.); 344; 0.77%	Kelly Block
Desnethé—Missinippi—Churchill River	Tammy Cook-Searson; 7,225; 26.51%	Gary Vidal; 11,531; 42.30%	Georgina Jolibois; 7,741; 28.40%	Sarah Kraynick; 543; 1.99%	Jerome Perrault; 217; 0.80%		Georgina Jolibois
Prince Albert	Estelle Hjertaas; 4,107; 10.34%	Randy Hoback; 26,891; 67.72%	Harmony Johnson-Harder; 6,925; 17.44%	Kerri Wall; 839; 2.11%	Kelly Day; 778; 1.96%	Brian Littlepine (VCP); 170; 0.43%	Randy Hoback
Saskatoon—Grasswood	Tracy Muggli; 8,419; 17.03%	Kevin Waugh; 26,336; 53.27%	Erika Ritchie; 12,672; 25.63%	Neil Sinclair; 1,320; 2.67%	Mark Friesen; 692; 1.40%		Kevin Waugh
Saskatoon—University	Susan Hayton; 6,146; 13.07%	Corey Tochor; 24,514; 52.13%	Claire Card; 13,994; 29.76%	Jan Norris; 1,401; 2.98%	Guto Penteado; 667; 1.42%	Jeff Willerton (CHP); 305; 0.65%	Brad Trost§
Saskatoon West	Shah Rukh; 2,863; 7.34%	Brad Redekopp; 18,597; 47.70%	Sheri Benson; 15,708; 40.29%	Shawn Setyo; 1,042; 2.67%	Isaac Hayes; 775; 1.99%		Sheri Benson

=== Alberta ===
==== Rural Alberta ====
Electoral district	Candidates						Incumbent
Electoral district	Liberal	Conservative	NDP	Green	PPC	Other	Incumbent
Banff—Airdrie	Gwyneth Midgley; 8,425; 10.79%	Blake Richards; 55,504; 71.09%	Anne Wilson; 8,185; 10.48%	Austin Mullins; 3,315; 4.25%	Nadine Wellwood; 2,651; 3.40%		Blake Richards
Battle River—Crowfoot	Dianne Clarke; 2,557; 4.10%	Damien Kurek; 53,309; 85.49%	Natasha Fryzuk; 3,185; 5.11%	Geordie Nelson; 1,689; 2.71%	David A. Michaud; 1,620; 2.60%		Kevin Sorenson†$
Bow River	Margaret Rhemtulla; 3,173; 5.75%	Martin Shields; 46,279; 83.93%	Lynn Macwilliam; 3,086; 5.60%	Hendrika Maria Tuithof de Jonge; 826; 1.50%	Tom Ikert; 1,321; 2.40%	Tom Lipp (CHP); 453; 0.82%	Martin Shields
Foothills	Cheryl Moller; 3,856; 5.88%	John Barlow; 53,872; 82.13%	Mickail Hendi; 3,767; 5.74%	Bridget Lacey; 2,398; 3.66%	Greg Hession; 1,698; 2.59%		John Barlow
Fort McMurray—Cold Lake	Maggie Farrington; 4,848; 9.51%	David Yurdiga; 40,706; 79.85%	Matthew Gilks; 2,883; 5.66%	Brian Deheer; 865; 1.70%	Matthew Barrett; 1,674; 3.28%		David Yurdiga
Grande Prairie-Mackenzie	Kenneth Munro; 2,910; 4.77%	Chris Warkentin; 51,198; 83.96%	Erin Aylward; 4,245; 6.96%	Shelley Termuende; 1,134; 1.86%	Douglas Gordon Burchill; 1,492; 2.45%		Chris Warkentin
Lakeland	Mark Watson; 2,565; 4.45%	Shannon Stubbs; 48,314; 83.91%	Jeffrey Swanson; 3,728; 6.47%	Kira Brunner; 1,105; 1.92%	Alain Houle; 1,468; 2.55%	Roberta Marie Graham (VCP); 147 0.26%	Shannon Stubbs
Lakeland	Mark Watson; 2,565; 4.45%	Shannon Stubbs; 48,314; 83.91%	Jeffrey Swanson; 3,728; 6.47%	Kira Brunner; 1,105; 1.92%	Alain Houle; 1,468; 2.55%	Robert McFadzean (Libert.); 251 0.44%	Shannon Stubbs
Lethbridge	Amy Bronson; 8,443; 13.64%	Rachael Harder; 40,713; 65.79%	Shandi Bleiken; 9,110; 14.72%	Stephnie Watson; 1,939; 3.13%	Grant Hepworth; 1,007; 1.63%	Marc Slingerland (CHP); 670; 1.08%	Rachael Harder
Medicine Hat—Cardston—Warner	Harris Kirshenbaum; 3,528; 6.64%	Glen Motz; 42,045; 79.18%	Elizabeth Thomson; 4,639; 8.74%	Shannon Hawthorne; 1,203; 2.27%	Andrew Nelson; 1,350; 2.54%	Dave Phillips (Ind.); 337; 0.63%	Glen Motz
Peace River—Westlock	Leslie Penny; 3,148; 6.09%	Arnold Viersen; 41,659; 80.66%	Jennifer Villebrun; 3,886; 7.52%	Peter Nygaard; 1,377; 2.67%	John Schrader; 1,579; 3.06%		Arnold Viersen
Red Deer—Lacombe	Tiffany Rose; 3,540; 5.25%	Blaine Calkins; 53,843; 79.83%	Lauren Pezzella; 6,012; 8.91%	Sarah Palmer; 1,596; 2.37%	Laura Lynn Thompson; 2,453; 3.64%		Blaine Calkins
Red Deer—Mountain View	Gary Tremblay; 3,795; 5.57%	Earl Dreeshen; 54,765; 80.34%	Logan Garbanewski; 4,946; 7.26%	Conner Borlé; 2,026; 2.97%	Paul Mitchell; 2,637; 3.87%		Earl Dreeshen
Yellowhead	Jeremy Hoefsloot; 2,912; 5.20%	Gerald Soroka; 45,964; 82.13%	Kristine Bowman; 3,898; 6.96%	Angelena Satdeo; 1,272; 2.27%	Douglas Galavan; 1,592; 2.84%	Gordon Francey (VCP); 108 0.19%	Jim Eglinski†
Yellowhead	Jeremy Hoefsloot; 2,912; 5.20%	Gerald Soroka; 45,964; 82.13%	Kristine Bowman; 3,898; 6.96%	Angelena Satdeo; 1,272; 2.27%	Douglas Galavan; 1,592; 2.84%	Cory Lystang (Libert.); 222 0.40%	Jim Eglinski†

==== Edmonton and environs ====
Electoral district	Candidates						Incumbent
Electoral district	Liberal	Conservative	NDP	Green	PPC	Other	Incumbent
Edmonton Centre	Randy Boissonnault; 17,524; 33.01%	James Cumming; 22,006; 41.45%	Katherine Swampy; 10,959; 20.64%	Grad Murray; 1,394; 2.63%	Paul Hookham; 805; 1.52%	Donovan Eckstrom (Rhino.); 206 0.39%	Randy Boissonnault
Edmonton Centre	Randy Boissonnault; 17,524; 33.01%	James Cumming; 22,006; 41.45%	Katherine Swampy; 10,959; 20.64%	Grad Murray; 1,394; 2.63%	Paul Hookham; 805; 1.52%	Peggy Morton (M-L); 79 0.15%	Randy Boissonnault
Edmonton Centre	Randy Boissonnault; 17,524; 33.01%	James Cumming; 22,006; 41.45%	Katherine Swampy; 10,959; 20.64%	Grad Murray; 1,394; 2.63%	Paul Hookham; 805; 1.52%	Adil Pirbhai (Ind.); 119 0.22%	Randy Boissonnault
Edmonton Griesbach	Habiba Mohamud; 8,100; 17.25%	Kerry Diotte; 24,120; 51.36%	Mark Cherrington; 11,800; 25.13%	Safi Khan; 1,189; 2.53%	Barbara Ellen Nichols; 1,074; 2.29%	Christine Alva Armas (CHP); 203 0.43%	Kerry Diotte
Edmonton Griesbach	Habiba Mohamud; 8,100; 17.25%	Kerry Diotte; 24,120; 51.36%	Mark Cherrington; 11,800; 25.13%	Safi Khan; 1,189; 2.53%	Barbara Ellen Nichols; 1,074; 2.29%	Alex Boykowich (Comm.); 170 0.36%	Kerry Diotte
Edmonton Griesbach	Habiba Mohamud; 8,100; 17.25%	Kerry Diotte; 24,120; 51.36%	Mark Cherrington; 11,800; 25.13%	Safi Khan; 1,189; 2.53%	Barbara Ellen Nichols; 1,074; 2.29%	Andrzej Gudanowski (Ind.); 216 0.46%	Kerry Diotte
Edmonton Griesbach	Habiba Mohamud; 8,100; 17.25%	Kerry Diotte; 24,120; 51.36%	Mark Cherrington; 11,800; 25.13%	Safi Khan; 1,189; 2.53%	Barbara Ellen Nichols; 1,074; 2.29%	Mary Joyce (M-L); 91 0.19%	Kerry Diotte
Edmonton Manning	Kamal Kadri; 11,692; 21.50%	Ziad Aboultaif; 30,425; 55.95%	Charmaine St. Germain; 9,555; 17.57%	Laura-Leah Shaw; 1,255; 2.31%	Daniel Summers; 1,109; 2.04%	Pam Phiri (CHP); 276 0.51%	Ziad Aboultaif
Edmonton Manning	Kamal Kadri; 11,692; 21.50%	Ziad Aboultaif; 30,425; 55.95%	Charmaine St. Germain; 9,555; 17.57%	Laura-Leah Shaw; 1,255; 2.31%	Daniel Summers; 1,109; 2.04%	Andre Vachon (M-L); 68 0.13%	Ziad Aboultaif
Edmonton Mill Woods	Amarjeet Sohi; 17,879; 33.62%	Tim Uppal; 26,736; 50.28%	Nigel Logan; 6,422; 12.08%	Tanya Herbert; 968; 1.82%	Annie Young; 953; 1.79%	Don Melanson (CHP); 219; 0.41%	Amarjeet Sohi
Edmonton Riverbend	Tariq Chaudary; 14,038; 22.96%	Matt Jeneroux; 35,126; 57.44%	Audrey Redman; 9,332; 15.26%	Valerie Kennedy; 1,797; 2.94%	Kevin Morris; 855; 1.40%		Matt Jeneroux
Edmonton Strathcona	Eleanor Olszewski; 6,592; 11.62%	Sam Lilly; 21,035; 37.07%	Heather McPherson; 26,823; 47.27%	Michael Kalmanovitch (Note: Kalmanovitch withdrew from the race on 16 October and threw his support to the NDP candidate. Because the candidate registration deadline had passed, he still appeared on the ballot as the Green candidate.); 1,152; 2.03%	Ian Cameron; 941; 1.66%	Dougal MacDonald (M-L); 77 0.14%	Linda Duncan†
Edmonton Strathcona	Eleanor Olszewski; 6,592; 11.62%	Sam Lilly; 21,035; 37.07%	Heather McPherson; 26,823; 47.27%	Michael Kalmanovitch; 1,152; 2.03%	Ian Cameron; 941; 1.66%	Naomi Rankin (Comm.); 125 0.22%	Linda Duncan†
Edmonton West	Kerrie Johnston; 11,812; 20.14%	Kelly McCauley; 35,719; 60.92%	Patrick Steuber; 8,537; 14.56%	Jackie Pearce; 1,441; 2.46%	Matthew Armstrong; 1,126; 1.92%		Kelly McCauley
Edmonton—Wetaskiwin	Richard Wong; 10,802; 12.35%	Mike Lake; 63,346; 72.43%	Noah Garver; 9,820; 11.23%	Emily Drzymala; 1,660; 1.90%	Neil Doell; 1,616; 1.85%	Travis Calliou (VCP); 211; 0.24%	Mike Lake
St. Albert—Edmonton	Greg Springate; 12,477; 19.17%	Michael Cooper; 39,506; 60.69%	Kathleen Mpulubusi; 9,895; 15.20%	Rob Dunbar; 1,594; 2.45%	Brigitte Cecelia; 1,268; 1.95%	Robert Bruce Fraser (VCP); 351; 0.54%	Michael Cooper
Sherwood Park—Fort Saskatchewan	Ron Thiering; 7,357; 10.07%	Garnett Genuis; 53,600; 73.37%	Aidan Theroux; 8,867; 12.14%	Laura Sanderson; 1,592; 2.18%	Darren Villetard; 1,334; 1.83%	Patrick McElrea (VCP); 300; 0.41%	Garnett Genuis
Sturgeon River—Parkland	Ronald Brochu; 4,696; 6.84%	Dane Lloyd; 53,235; 77.54%	Guy Desforges; 6,940; 10.11%	Cass Romyn; 1,745; 2.54%	Tyler Beauchamp; 1,625; 2.37%	Ernest Chauvet (CHP); 416; 0.61%	Dane Lloyd

==== Calgary ====
Electoral district	Candidates						Incumbent
Electoral district	Liberal	Conservative	NDP	Green	PPC	Other	Incumbent
Calgary Centre	Kent Hehr; 17,771; 26.98%	Greg McLean; 37,306; 56.64%	Jessica Buresi; 6,516; 9.89%	Thana Boonlert; 2,853; 4.33%	Chevy Johnston; 907; 1.38%	Eden Gould (Animal); 247 0.38%	Kent Hehr
Calgary Centre	Kent Hehr; 17,771; 26.98%	Greg McLean; 37,306; 56.64%	Jessica Buresi; 6,516; 9.89%	Thana Boonlert; 2,853; 4.33%	Chevy Johnston; 907; 1.38%	Dawid Pawlowski (CHP); 126 0.19%	Kent Hehr
Calgary Centre	Kent Hehr; 17,771; 26.98%	Greg McLean; 37,306; 56.64%	Jessica Buresi; 6,516; 9.89%	Thana Boonlert; 2,853; 4.33%	Chevy Johnston; 907; 1.38%	Michael Pewtress (Ind.); 138 0.21%	Kent Hehr
Calgary Confederation	Jordan Stein; 14,908; 22.62%	Len Webber; 36,312; 55.11%	Gurcharan Singh Sidhu; 7,312; 11.10%	Natalie Odd; 5,700; 8.65%	Colin Korol; 1,136; 1.72%	Kevan Hunter (M-L); 117 0.18%	Len Webber
Calgary Confederation	Jordan Stein; 14,908; 22.62%	Len Webber; 36,312; 55.11%	Gurcharan Singh Sidhu; 7,312; 11.10%	Natalie Odd; 5,700; 8.65%	Colin Korol; 1,136; 1.72%	**Tim Moen** (Libert.); 407 0.62%	Len Webber
Calgary Forest Lawn	Jag Anand; 8,690; 21.65%	Jasraj Singh Hallan; 23,585; 59.81%	Joe Pimlott; 4,227; 10.58%	William Carnegie; 1,318; 3.30%	Dave Levesque; 1,089; 2.72%	Brent Nichols (Ind.); 388 0.97%	vacant
Calgary Forest Lawn	Jag Anand; 8,690; 21.65%	Jasraj Singh Hallan; 23,585; 59.81%	Joe Pimlott; 4,227; 10.58%	William Carnegie; 1,318; 3.30%	Dave Levesque; 1,089; 2.72%	William James Ryder (VCP); 91 0.23%	vacant
Calgary Forest Lawn	Jag Anand; 8,690; 21.65%	Jasraj Singh Hallan; 23,585; 59.81%	Joe Pimlott; 4,227; 10.58%	William Carnegie; 1,318; 3.30%	Dave Levesque; 1,089; 2.72%	Esther Sutherland (CHP); 222 0.56%	vacant
Calgary Forest Lawn	Jag Anand; 8,690; 21.65%	Jasraj Singh Hallan; 23,585; 59.81%	Joe Pimlott; 4,227; 10.58%	William Carnegie; 1,318; 3.30%	Dave Levesque; 1,089; 2.72%	Jonathan Trautman (Comm.); 134 0.34%	vacant
Calgary Heritage	Scott Forsyth; 8,057; 13.96%	Bob Benzen; 40,817; 70.72%	Holly Heffernan; 5,278; 9.14%	Allie Tulick; 2,027; 3.51%	Stephanie Hoeppner; 1,123; 1.95%	Larry R. Heather (CHP); 185 0.32%	Bob Benzen
Calgary Heritage	Scott Forsyth; 8,057; 13.96%	Bob Benzen; 40,817; 70.72%	Holly Heffernan; 5,278; 9.14%	Allie Tulick; 2,027; 3.51%	Stephanie Hoeppner; 1,123; 1.95%	Hunter Mills (Ind.); 228 0.40%	Bob Benzen
Calgary Midnapore	Brian Aalto; 7,507; 11.03%	Stephanie Kusie; 50,559; 74.26%	Gurmit Bhachu; 6,445; 9.47%	Taylor Stasila; 1,992; 2.93%	Edward Gao; 1,585; 2.33%		Stephanie Kusie
Calgary Nose Hill	Josephine Tsang; 8,703; 15.74%	Michelle Rempel; 38,588; 69.77%	Patrick King; 5,304; 9.59%	Jocelyn Grossé; 1,554; 2.81%	Kelly Lorencz; 1,089; 1.97%	Peggy Askin (M-L); 71; 0.13%	Michelle Rempel
Calgary Rocky Ridge	Todd Kathol; 13,012; 18.42%	Pat Kelly; 48,253; 68.30%	Nathan LeBlanc Fortin; 6,051; 8.56%	Catriona Wright; 2,011; 2.85%	Tyler Poulin; 1,053; 1.49%	Shaoli Wang (Ind.); 270; 0.38%	Pat Kelly
Calgary Shepard	Del Arnold; 8,644; 11.06%	Tom Kmiec; 58,614; 75.01%	David Brian Smith; 6,828; 8.74%	Evelyn Tanaka; 2,345; 3.00%	Kyle Scott; 1,709; 2.19%		Tom Kmiec
Calgary Signal Hill	Ghada Alatrash; 9,722; 15.32%	Ron Liepert; 44,421; 69.98%	Khalis Ahmed; 5,355; 8.44%	Marco Reid; 2,139; 3.37%	Gord Squire; 1,130; 1.78%	Christina Bassett (Rhino.); 511 0.81%	Ron Liepert
Calgary Signal Hill	Ghada Alatrash; 9,722; 15.32%	Ron Liepert; 44,421; 69.98%	Khalis Ahmed; 5,355; 8.44%	Marco Reid; 2,139; 3.37%	Gord Squire; 1,130; 1.78%	Garry Dirk (CHP); 200 0.32%	Ron Liepert
Calgary Skyview	Nirmala Naidoo; 14,327; 28.34%	Jag Sahota; 26,533; 52.49%	Gurinder Singh Gill; 7,540; 14.92%	Signe Knutson; 800; 1.58%	Harry Dhillon; 603; 1.19%	Joseph Alexander (CHP); 483 0.96%	Darshan Kang†
Calgary Skyview	Nirmala Naidoo; 14,327; 28.34%	Jag Sahota; 26,533; 52.49%	Gurinder Singh Gill; 7,540; 14.92%	Signe Knutson; 800; 1.58%	Harry Dhillon; 603; 1.19%	Daniel Blanchard (M-L); 130 0.26%	Darshan Kang†
Calgary Skyview	Nirmala Naidoo; 14,327; 28.34%	Jag Sahota; 26,533; 52.49%	Gurinder Singh Gill; 7,540; 14.92%	Signe Knutson; 800; 1.58%	Harry Dhillon; 603; 1.19%	Harpreet Singh Dawar (CFF); 136 0.27%	Darshan Kang†

=== British Columbia ===
==== BC Interior ====
Electoral district	Candidates						Incumbent
Electoral district	Liberal	Conservative	NDP	Green	PPC	Other	Incumbent
Cariboo—Prince George	Tracy Calogheros; 10,932; 19.96%	Todd Doherty; 28,848; 52.67%	Heather Sapergia; 8,440; 15.41%	Mackenzie Kerr; 4,998; 9.12%	Jing Lan Yang; 1,206; 2.20%	Michael Orr (Ind.); 350; 0.64%	Todd Doherty
Central Okanagan—Similkameen—Nicola	Mary Ann Murphy; 16,252; 25.03%	Dan Albas; 31,135; 47.95%	Joan Phillip; 10,904; 16.79%	Robert Mellalieu; 5,086; 7.83%	Allan Duncan; 1,345; 2.07%	Jesse Regier (Libert.); 213; 0.33%	Dan Albas
Kamloops—Thompson—Cariboo	Terry Lake; 19,716; 27.21%	Cathy McLeod; 32,415; 44.74%	Cynthia Egli; 9,936; 13.71%	Iain Currie; 8,789; 12.13%	Ken Finlayson; 1,132; 1.56%	Kira Cheeseborough (Animal); 321 0.44%	Cathy McLeod
Kamloops—Thompson—Cariboo	Terry Lake; 19,716; 27.21%	Cathy McLeod; 32,415; 44.74%	Cynthia Egli; 9,936; 13.71%	Iain Currie; 8,789; 12.13%	Ken Finlayson; 1,132; 1.56%	Peter Kerek (Comm.); 144 0.20%	Cathy McLeod
Kelowna—Lake Country	Stephen Fuhr; 22,627; 32.74%	Tracy Gray; 31,497; 45.57%	Justin Kulik; 8,381; 12.13%	Travis Ashley; 5,171; 7.48%	John Barr; 1,225; 1.77%	Daniel Joseph (Ind.); 152 0.22%	Stephen Fuhr
Kelowna—Lake Country	Stephen Fuhr; 22,627; 32.74%	Tracy Gray; 31,497; 45.57%	Justin Kulik; 8,381; 12.13%	Travis Ashley; 5,171; 7.48%	John Barr; 1,225; 1.77%	Silverado Socrates (Ind.); 67 0.10%	Stephen Fuhr
Kootenay—Columbia	Robin Goldsbury; 6,151; 9.14%	Rob Morrison; 30,168; 44.81%	Wayne Stetski; 23,149; 34.38%	Abra Brynne; 6,145; 9.13%	Rick Stewart; 1,378; 2.05%	Trev Miller (Animal); 339; 0.50%	Wayne Stetski
North Okanagan—Shuswap	Cindy Derkaz; 16,783; 22.64%	Mel Arnold; 36,154; 48.76%	Harwinder Sandhu; 11,353; 15.31%	Marc Reinarz; 7,828; 10.56%	Kyle Delfing; 2,027; 2.73%		Mel Arnold
Prince George—Peace River—Northern Rockies	Mavis Erickson; 6,391; 11.59%	Bob Zimmer; 38,473; 69.79%	Marcia Luccock; 5,069; 9.19%	Catharine Kendall; 3,448; 6.25%	Ron Vaillant; 1,748; 3.17%		Bob Zimmer
Skeena—Bulkley Valley	Dave Birdi; 4,793; 11.58%	Claire Rattée; 13,756; 33.24%	Taylor Bachrach; 16,944; 40.94%	Mike Sawyer; 3,280; 7.93%	Jody Craven; 940; 2.27%	Danny Nunes (Ind.); 164 0.40%	Nathan Cullen†
Skeena—Bulkley Valley	Dave Birdi; 4,793; 11.58%	Claire Rattée; 13,756; 33.24%	Taylor Bachrach; 16,944; 40.94%	Mike Sawyer; 3,280; 7.93%	Jody Craven; 940; 2.27%	Merv Ritchie (Ind.); 157 0.38%	Nathan Cullen†
Skeena—Bulkley Valley	Dave Birdi; 4,793; 11.58%	Claire Rattée; 13,756; 33.24%	Taylor Bachrach; 16,944; 40.94%	Mike Sawyer; 3,280; 7.93%	Jody Craven; 940; 2.27%	**Rod Taylor** (CHP); 1,350 3.26%	Nathan Cullen†
South Okanagan—West Kootenay	Connie Denesiuk; 11,705; 17.16%	Helena Konanz; 24,013; 35.21%	Richard Cannings; 24,809; 36.38%	Tara Howse; 5,672; 8.32%	Sean Taylor; 1,638; 2.40%	Carolina Hopkins (Ind.); 359; 0.53%	Richard Cannings

==== Fraser Valley and Southern Lower Mainland ====
Electoral district	Candidates						Incumbent
Electoral district	Liberal	Conservative	NDP	Green	PPC	Other	Incumbent
Abbotsford	Seamus Heffernan; 10,560; 21.58%	Ed Fast; 25,162; 51.42%	Madeleine Sauve; 8,257; 16.87%	Stephen Fowler; 3,702; 7.56%	Locke Duncan; 985; 2.01%	Aeriol Alderking (CHP); 270; 0.55%	Ed Fast
Chilliwack—Hope	Kelly Velonis; 10,848; 20.18%	Mark Strahl; 26,672; 49.62%	Heather McQuillan; 8,957; 16.66%	Arthur Green; 5,243; 9.75%	Rob Bogunovic; 1,760; 3.27%	Daniel Lamache (CHP); 202 0.38%	Mark Strahl
Chilliwack—Hope	Kelly Velonis; 10,848; 20.18%	Mark Strahl; 26,672; 49.62%	Heather McQuillan; 8,957; 16.66%	Arthur Green; 5,243; 9.75%	Rob Bogunovic; 1,760; 3.27%	Dorothy-Jean O'Donnell (M-L); 73 0.14%	Mark Strahl
Cloverdale—Langley City	John Aldag; 19,542; 35.22%	Tamara Jansen; 20,936; 37.73%	Rae Banwarie; 10,508; 18.94%	Caelum Nutbrown; 3,572; 6.44%	Ian Kennedy; 930; 1.68%		John Aldag
Delta	Carla Qualtrough; 22,257; 41.23%	Tanya Corbet; 17,809; 32.99%	Randy Anderson-Fennell; 8,792; 16.29%	Craig DeCraene; 3,387; 6.28%	Angelina Ireland; 948; 1.76%	Amarit Bains (Ind.); 398 0.74%	Carla Qualtrough
Delta	Carla Qualtrough; 22,257; 41.23%	Tanya Corbet; 17,809; 32.99%	Randy Anderson-Fennell; 8,792; 16.29%	Craig DeCraene; 3,387; 6.28%	Angelina Ireland; 948; 1.76%	Tony Bennett (Ind.); 385 0.71%	Carla Qualtrough
Fleetwood—Port Kells	Ken Hardie; 18,545; 37.66%	Shinder Purewal; 16,646; 33.80%	Annie Ohana; 10,569; 21.46%	Tanya Baertl; 2,378; 4.83%	Mike Poulin; 1,104; 2.24%		Ken Hardie
Langley—Aldergrove	Leon Jensen; 16,254; 25.62%	Tako Van Popta; 29,823; 47.00%	Stacey Wakelin; 10,690; 16.85%	Kaija Farstad; 4,881; 7.69%	Natalie Dipietra-Cudmore; 1,305; 2.06%	Alex Joehl (Libert.); 499; 0.79%	vacant
Mission—Matsqui—Fraser Canyon	Jati Sidhu; 12,299; 26.70%	Brad Vis; 19,535; 42.41%	Michael Nenn; 8,089; 17.56%	John Kidder; 5,019; 10.90%	Julius Nick Csaszar; 1,055; 2.29%	Elaine Wismer (M-L); 69; 0.15%	Jati Sidhu
Pitt Meadows—Maple Ridge	Dan Ruimy; 16,125; 29.73%	Marc Dalton; 19,650; 36.23%	John Mogk; 12,958; 23.89%	Ariane Jaschke; 4,332; 7.99%	Bryton Cherrier; 698; 1.29%	Steve Ranta (Ind.); 468; 0.86%	Dan Ruimy
Richmond Centre	Steven Kou; 11,052; 28.47%	Alice Wong; 19,037; 49.04%	Dustin Innes; 5,617; 14.47%	Françoise Raunet; 2,376; 6.12%	Ivan Pak; 538; 1.39%	Zhe Zhang (Ind.); 197; 0.51%	Alice Wong
South Surrey—White Rock	Gordie Hogg; 21,692; 37.38%	Kerry-Lynne Findlay; 24,310; 41.89%	Stephen Crozier; 6,716; 11.57%	Beverly Pixie Hobby; 4,458; 7.68%	Joel Poulin; 852; 1.47%		Gordie Hogg
Steveston—Richmond East	Joe Peschisolido; 14,731; 35.11%	Kenny Chiu; 17,478; 41.66%	Jaeden Dela Torre; 6,321; 15.07%	Nicole Iaci; 2,972; 7.08%		Ping Chan (Ind.); 449; 1.07%	Joe Peschisolido
Surrey Centre	Randeep Singh Sarai; 15,453; 37.40%	Tina Bains; 10,505; 25.42%	Sarjit Singh Saran; 11,353; 27.48%	John Werring; 2,558; 6.19%	Jaswinder Singh Dilawari; 709; 1.72%	Jeffrey Breti (Ind.); 243 0.59%	Randeep Sarai
Surrey Centre	Randeep Singh Sarai; 15,453; 37.40%	Tina Bains; 10,505; 25.42%	Sarjit Singh Saran; 11,353; 27.48%	John Werring; 2,558; 6.19%	Jaswinder Singh Dilawari; 709; 1.72%	George Gidora (Comm.); 120 0.29%	Randeep Sarai
Surrey Centre	Randeep Singh Sarai; 15,453; 37.40%	Tina Bains; 10,505; 25.42%	Sarjit Singh Saran; 11,353; 27.48%	John Werring; 2,558; 6.19%	Jaswinder Singh Dilawari; 709; 1.72%	Kevin Pielak (CHP); 378 0.91%	Randeep Sarai
Surrey—Newton	Sukh Dhaliwal; 18,960; 45.04%	Harpreet Singh; 8,824; 20.96%	Harjit Singh Gill; 12,306; 29.23%	Rabaab Khehra; 1,355; 3.22%	Holly Verchère; 653; 1.55%		Sukh Dhaliwal

==== Vancouver and Northern Lower Mainland ====
Electoral district	Candidates						Incumbent
Electoral district	Liberal	Conservative	NDP	Green	PPC	Other	Incumbent
Burnaby North—Seymour	Terry Beech; 17,770; 35.50%	Heather Leung (Note: Leung was ejected from the Conservative Party on 5 October. Because the candidate registration deadline had passed, she still appeared on the ballot as the Conservative candidate.); 9,734; 19.45%	Svend Robinson; 16,185; 32.33%	Amita Kuttner; 4,801; 9.59%	Rocky Dong; 1,079; 2.16%	Lewis Clarke Dahlby (Libert.); 219 0.44%	Terry Beech
Burnaby North—Seymour	Terry Beech; 17,770; 35.50%	Heather Leung; 9,734; 19.45%	Svend Robinson; 16,185; 32.33%	Amita Kuttner; 4,801; 9.59%	Rocky Dong; 1,079; 2.16%	Robert Taylor (Ind.); 271 0.54%	Terry Beech
Burnaby South	Neelam Brar; 10,706; 23.79%	Jay Shin; 13,914; 30.92%	**Jagmeet Singh**; 16,956; 37.67%	Brennan Wauters; 2,477; 5.50%	Al Rawdah; 645; 1.43%	Rex Brocki (Libert.); 246 0.55%	Jagmeet Singh
Burnaby South	Neelam Brar; 10,706; 23.79%	Jay Shin; 13,914; 30.92%	**Jagmeet Singh**; 16,956; 37.67%	Brennan Wauters; 2,477; 5.50%	Al Rawdah; 645; 1.43%	Brian Sproule (M-L); 62 0.14%	Jagmeet Singh
Coquitlam—Port Coquitlam	Ron McKinnon; 20,178; 34.69%	Nicholas Insley; 19,788; 34.01%	Christina Gower; 13,383; 23.00%	Brad Nickason; 4,025; 6.92%	Roland Spornicu; 703; 1.21%	Dan Iova (VCP); 98; 0.17%	Ron McKinnon
New Westminster—Burnaby	Will Davis; 12,414; 23.43%	Megan Veck; 11,439; 21.59%	Peter Julian; 23,437; 44.24%	Suzanne de Montigny; 4,378; 8.26%	Hansen Ginn; 862; 1.63%	Neeraj Murarka (Libert.); 307 0.58%	Peter Julian
New Westminster—Burnaby	Will Davis; 12,414; 23.43%	Megan Veck; 11,439; 21.59%	Peter Julian; 23,437; 44.24%	Suzanne de Montigny; 4,378; 8.26%	Hansen Ginn; 862; 1.63%	Ahmad Passyar (Ind.); 83 0.16%	Peter Julian
New Westminster—Burnaby	Will Davis; 12,414; 23.43%	Megan Veck; 11,439; 21.59%	Peter Julian; 23,437; 44.24%	Suzanne de Montigny; 4,378; 8.26%	Hansen Ginn; 862; 1.63%	Joseph Theriault (M-L); 57 0.11%	Peter Julian
North Vancouver	Jonathan Wilkinson; 26,979; 42.87%	Andrew Saxton; 16,908; 26.87%	Justine Bell; 10,340; 16.43%	George Orr; 7,868; 12.50%	Azmairnin Jadavji; 835; 1.33%		Jonathan Wilkinson
Port Moody—Coquitlam	Sara Badiei; 15,695; 29.06%	Nelly Shin; 16,855; 31.21%	Bonita Zarrillo; 16,702; 30.93%	Bryce Watts; 3,873; 7.17%	Jayson Chabot; 821; 1.52%	Roland Verrier (M-L); 57; 0.11%	Fin Donnelly†
Vancouver Centre	Hedy Fry; 23,599; 42.18%	David Cavey; 10,782; 19.27%	Breen Ouellette; 13,280; 23.74%	Jesse Brown; 7,002; 12.52%	Louise Kierans; 724; 1.29%	Lily Bowman (Ind.); 142 0.25%	Hedy Fry
Vancouver Centre	Hedy Fry; 23,599; 42.18%	David Cavey; 10,782; 19.27%	Breen Ouellette; 13,280; 23.74%	Jesse Brown; 7,002; 12.52%	Louise Kierans; 724; 1.29%	John Clarke (Libert.); 379 0.68%	Hedy Fry
Vancouver Centre	Hedy Fry; 23,599; 42.18%	David Cavey; 10,782; 19.27%	Breen Ouellette; 13,280; 23.74%	Jesse Brown; 7,002; 12.52%	Louise Kierans; 724; 1.29%	Imtiaz Popat (Ind.); 38 0.07%	Hedy Fry
Vancouver East	Kyle Demes; 10,085; 18.13%	Chris Corsetti; 6,724; 12.09%	Jenny Kwan; 29,236; 52.57%	Bridget Burns; 8,062; 14.50%	Karin Litzcke; 679; 1.22%	Gölök Z Buday (Libert.); 562 1.01%	Jenny Kwan
Vancouver East	Kyle Demes; 10,085; 18.13%	Chris Corsetti; 6,724; 12.09%	Jenny Kwan; 29,236; 52.57%	Bridget Burns; 8,062; 14.50%	Karin Litzcke; 679; 1.22%	Anne Jamieson (M-L); 86 0.15%	Jenny Kwan
Vancouver East	Kyle Demes; 10,085; 18.13%	Chris Corsetti; 6,724; 12.09%	Jenny Kwan; 29,236; 52.57%	Bridget Burns; 8,062; 14.50%	Karin Litzcke; 679; 1.22%	Peter Marcus (Comm.); 177 0.32%	Jenny Kwan
Vancouver Granville	Taleeb Noormohamed; 14,088; 26.57%	Zach Segal; 11,605; 21.88%	Yvonne Hanson; 6,960; 13.12%	Louise Boutin; 2,683; 5.06%	Naomi Chocyk; 431; 0.81%	Jody Wilson-Raybould (Ind.); 17,265; 32.56%	Jody Wilson-Raybould
Vancouver Kingsway	Tamara Taggart; 10,194; 23.08%	Helen Quan; 8,804; 19.94%	Don Davies; 21,680; 49.09%	Lawrence Taylor; 2,675; 6.06%	Ian Torn; 427; 0.97%	Kimball Cariou (Comm.); 292 0.66%	Don Davies
Vancouver Kingsway	Tamara Taggart; 10,194; 23.08%	Helen Quan; 8,804; 19.94%	Don Davies; 21,680; 49.09%	Lawrence Taylor; 2,675; 6.06%	Ian Torn; 427; 0.97%	Donna Peterson (M-L); 91 0.21%	Don Davies
Vancouver Quadra	Joyce Murray; 22,093; 43.53%	Kathleen Dixon; 14,082; 27.75%	Leigh Kenny; 7,681; 15.13%	Geoff Wright; 6,308; 12.43%	Sandra Filosof-Schipper; 428; 0.84%	Austen Erhardt (Ind.); 162; 0.32%	Joyce Murray
Vancouver South	Harjit S. Sajjan; 17,808; 41.23%	Wai Young; 14,388; 33.31%	Sean McQuillan; 8,015; 18.56%	Judy Zaichkowsky; 2,451; 5.67%	Alain Deng; 532; 1.23%		Harjit Sajjan
West Vancouver—Sunshine Coast—Sea to Sky Country	Patrick Weiler; 22,673; 34.89%	Gabrielle Loren; 17,359; 26.71%	Judith Wilson; 9,027; 13.89%	Dana Taylor; 14,579; 22.44%	Robert Douglas Bebb; 1,010; 1.55%	Terry Grimwood (Ind.); 159 0.24%	Pamela Goldsmith-Jones†$
West Vancouver—Sunshine Coast—Sea to Sky Country	Patrick Weiler; 22,673; 34.89%	Gabrielle Loren; 17,359; 26.71%	Judith Wilson; 9,027; 13.89%	Dana Taylor; 14,579; 22.44%	Robert Douglas Bebb; 1,010; 1.55%	Gordon Jeffrey (Rhino.); 173 0.27%	Pamela Goldsmith-Jones†$

==== Vancouver Island ====
Electoral district	Candidates						Incumbent
Electoral district	Liberal	Conservative	NDP	Green	PPC	Other	Incumbent
Courtenay—Alberni	Jonah Baden Gowans; 8,620; 11.93%	Byron Horner; 23,936; 33.12%	Gord Johns; 29,790; 41.21%	Sean Wood; 9,762; 13.51%		Barbara Biley (M-L); 172; 0.24%	Gord Johns
Cowichan—Malahat—Langford	Blair Herbert; 10,301; 15.79%	Alana DeLong; 16,959; 26.00%	Alistair MacGregor; 23,519; 36.06%	Lydia Hwitsum; 13,181; 20.21%	Rhonda Chen; 1,066; 1.63%	Robin Morton Stanbridge (CHP); 202; 0.31%	Alistair MacGregor
Esquimalt—Saanich—Sooke	Jamie Hammond; 12,554; 17.90%	Randall Pewarchuk; 13,409; 19.12%	Randall Garrison; 23,887; 34.06%	David Merner; 18,506; 26.39%	Jeremy Gustafson; 1,089; 1.55%	Fidelia Godron (Ind.); 99 0.14%	Randall Garrison
Esquimalt—Saanich—Sooke	Jamie Hammond; 12,554; 17.90%	Randall Pewarchuk; 13,409; 19.12%	Randall Garrison; 23,887; 34.06%	David Merner; 18,506; 26.39%	Jeremy Gustafson; 1,089; 1.55%	Louis Lesosky (Ind.); 100 0.14%	Randall Garrison
Esquimalt—Saanich—Sooke	Jamie Hammond; 12,554; 17.90%	Randall Pewarchuk; 13,409; 19.12%	Randall Garrison; 23,887; 34.06%	David Merner; 18,506; 26.39%	Jeremy Gustafson; 1,089; 1.55%	Philip Ney (Ind.); 83 0.12%	Randall Garrison
Esquimalt—Saanich—Sooke	Jamie Hammond; 12,554; 17.90%	Randall Pewarchuk; 13,409; 19.12%	Randall Garrison; 23,887; 34.06%	David Merner; 18,506; 26.39%	Jeremy Gustafson; 1,089; 1.55%	Josh Steffler (Libert.); 287 0.41%	Randall Garrison
Esquimalt—Saanich—Sooke	Jamie Hammond; 12,554; 17.90%	Randall Pewarchuk; 13,409; 19.12%	Randall Garrison; 23,887; 34.06%	David Merner; 18,506; 26.39%	Jeremy Gustafson; 1,089; 1.55%	Tyson Strandlund (Comm.); 111 0.16%	Randall Garrison
Nanaimo—Ladysmith	Michelle Corfield; 9,735; 13.55%	John Hirst; 18,634; 25.93%	Bob Chamberlin; 16,985; 23.63%	Paul Manly; 24,844; 34.57%	Jennifer Clarke; 1,049; 1.46%	James Chumsa (Comm.); 104 0.14%	Paul Manly
Nanaimo—Ladysmith	Michelle Corfield; 9,735; 13.55%	John Hirst; 18,634; 25.93%	Bob Chamberlin; 16,985; 23.63%	Paul Manly; 24,844; 34.57%	Jennifer Clarke; 1,049; 1.46%	Brian Marlatt (PC); 207 0.29%	Paul Manly
Nanaimo—Ladysmith	Michelle Corfield; 9,735; 13.55%	John Hirst; 18,634; 25.93%	Bob Chamberlin; 16,985; 23.63%	Paul Manly; 24,844; 34.57%	Jennifer Clarke; 1,049; 1.46%	Geoff Stoneman (Ind.); 235 0.33%	Paul Manly
Nanaimo—Ladysmith	Michelle Corfield; 9,735; 13.55%	John Hirst; 18,634; 25.93%	Bob Chamberlin; 16,985; 23.63%	Paul Manly; 24,844; 34.57%	Jennifer Clarke; 1,049; 1.46%	Echo White (Ind.); 71 0.10%	Paul Manly
North Island—Powell River	Peter Schwarzhoff; 8,251; 13.11%	Shelley Downey; 20,502; 32.59%	Rachel Blaney; 23,834; 37.88%	Mark de Bruijn; 8,891; 14.13%	Brian Rundle; 1,102; 1.75%	Carla Neal (M-L); 48 0.08%	Rachel Blaney
North Island—Powell River	Peter Schwarzhoff; 8,251; 13.11%	Shelley Downey; 20,502; 32.59%	Rachel Blaney; 23,834; 37.88%	Mark de Bruijn; 8,891; 14.13%	Brian Rundle; 1,102; 1.75%	Glen Staples (Ind.); 287 0.46%	Rachel Blaney
Saanich—Gulf Islands	Ryan Windsor; 11,326; 16.62%	David Busch; 13,784; 20.23%	Sabina Singh; 8,657; 12.70%	**Elizabeth May**; 33,454; 49.09%	Ron Broda; 929; 1.36%		Elizabeth May
Victoria	Nikki Macdonald; 15,952; 22.30%	Richard Caron; 9,038; 12.63%	Laurel Collins; 23,765; 33.21%	Racelle Kooy; 21,383; 29.89%	Alyson Culbert; 920; 1.29%	Robert Duncan (Comm.); 113 0.16%	Murray Rankin†
Victoria	Nikki Macdonald; 15,952; 22.30%	Richard Caron; 9,038; 12.63%	Laurel Collins; 23,765; 33.21%	Racelle Kooy; 21,383; 29.89%	Alyson Culbert; 920; 1.29%	Jordan Reichert (Animal); 221 0.31%	Murray Rankin†
Victoria	Nikki Macdonald; 15,952; 22.30%	Richard Caron; 9,038; 12.63%	Laurel Collins; 23,765; 33.21%	Racelle Kooy; 21,383; 29.89%	Alyson Culbert; 920; 1.29%	Keith Rosenberg (VCP); 46 0.06%	Murray Rankin†
Victoria	Nikki Macdonald; 15,952; 22.30%	Richard Caron; 9,038; 12.63%	Laurel Collins; 23,765; 33.21%	Racelle Kooy; 21,383; 29.89%	Alyson Culbert; 920; 1.29%	David Shebib (Ind.); 111 0.16%	Murray Rankin†

=== Nunavut ===
Electoral district	Candidates				Incumbent
Electoral district	Liberal	Conservative	NDP	Green	Incumbent
Nunavut	Megan Pizzo Lyall; 2,918; 30.87%	Leona Aglukkaq; 2,469; 26.12%	Mumilaaq Qaqqaq; 3,861; 40.84%	Douglas Roy; 206; 2.18%	Hunter Tootoo†

=== Northwest Territories ===
Electoral district	Candidates					Incumbent
Electoral district	Liberal	Conservative	NDP	Green	PPC	Incumbent
Northwest Territories	Michael McLeod; 6,467; 39.70%	Yanik D'Aigle; 4,157; 25.52%	Mary Beckett; 3,640; 22.34%	Paul Falvo; 1,731; 10.63%	Luke Quinlan; 296; 1.82%	Michael McLeod

=== Yukon ===
Electoral district	Candidates					Incumbent
Electoral district	Liberal	Conservative	NDP	Green	PPC	Incumbent
Yukon	Larry Bagnell; 7,034; 33.47%	Jonas Jacot Smith; 6,881; 32.74%	Justin Lemphers; 4,617; 21.97%	Lenore Morris; 2,201; 10.47%	Joseph Zelezny; 284; 1.35%	Larry Bagnell
