= Canadian federal election results in Central Ontario =

Electoral history
Year	Results
2025	
2021	
2019	
2015	
2011	
2008	
2006	
2004	
2000	
1997	
1993	
1988	
1984	
1980	
1979	
1974	
1972	
1968	
1965	
1963	
1962	
1958	
1957	
1953	
1949	
1945	
1940	
1935	
1930	
1926	
1926	

Canadian federal elections have provided the following results in Central Ontario.

== Regional profile ==
The region is the central section of Southern Ontario, mainly comprising the rural area around Lake Simcoe. This has traditionally been the most conservative region of Ontario, in sharp contrast to the Greater Toronto Area to the south. It has historically been the backbone of support for the provincial Tories.

The citizens of the region are mostly white, Protestant, and agrarian, with a large number of social conservatives. Some parts of this region are as conservative as rural Alberta. This region was the heartland of the Reform Party and Canadian Alliance in Ontario, with Simcoe Centre electing a Reform MP in 1993—Reform's only victory east of Manitoba, ever. However, due to massive Reform-PC vote-splitting, the Liberals swept the region during the Chrétien era. The Unite the Right movement (accompanied by Chrétien's departure from office) led to the newly united Conservative Party seizing all but four of the region's seats in 2004. In 2006, Liberal support in this region melted; the only Liberal elected in this region was Belinda Stronach, a former Conservative who crossed the floor in 2005. Stronach's seat reverted to the Conservatives in 2008. In 2011, the Conservatives again swept the region, with the NDP's late-campaign surge propelling them to second in all but one riding.

The region was one of the few that resisted the massive Liberal surge in Ontario in 2015, though the Liberals managed to take Stronach's old riding of Newmarket—Aurora on the outer fringe of the Greater Toronto Area, a region that swung heavily to the Liberals in this election. They also managed to take all of Peterborough.

The riding of Peterborough—Kawartha (formerly simply Peterborough) had long been recognized by political scientists as one of the best bellwether ridings in the country.

=== Votes by party throughout time ===
Election	Liberal	Conservative	New Democratic	Green	People's	PC	Reform / Alliance	Others
1979	125,841; 29.0%	—N/a	71,225; 16.4%	—N/a	—N/a	234,660; 54.0%	—N/a	2,328; 0.5%
1980	143,779; 34.5%	—N/a	80,135; 19.2%	—N/a	—N/a	189,788; 45.5%	—N/a	2,544; 0.6%
1984	105,152; 22.6%	—N/a	74,727; 16.0%	1,138; 0.2%	—N/a	280,396; 60.2%	—N/a	3,635; 0.8%
1988	157,109; 34.4%	—N/a	81,975; 17.9%	841; 0.2%	—N/a	205,296; 44.9%	—N/a	10,906; 2.4%
1993	215,871; 41.1%	—N/a	19,094; 3.6%	1,236; 0.2%	—N/a	118,519; 22.5%	153,005; 29.1%	17,748; 3.4%
1997	210,873; 41.7%	—N/a	30,213; 6.0%	894; 0.2%	—N/a	110,374; 21.8%	148,429; 29.4%	4,602; 0.9%
2000	219,934; 45.4%	—N/a	22,700; 4.7%	3,469; 0.7%	—N/a	88,522; 18.3%	146,637; 30.3%	3,181; 0.7%
2004	227,496; 39.5%	234,459; 40.7%	73,857; 12.8%	31,259; 5.4%	—N/a	—N/a	—N/a	6,725; 1.2%
2006	213,664; 33.8%	279,356; 44.1%	94,479; 14.9%	40,721; 6.4%	—N/a	—N/a	—N/a	3,667; 0.6%
2008	140,068; 24.2%	297,962; 51.5%	68,130; 11.8%	66,375; 11.5%	—N/a	—N/a	—N/a	4,086; 0.7%
2011	105,996; 16.9%	347,266; 55.4%	121,595; 19.4%	38,882; 6.2%	—N/a	—N/a	—N/a	11,640; 1.9%
2015	275,281; 39.3%	307,014; 43.9%	87,261; 12.5%	26,795; 3.8%	—N/a	—N/a	—N/a	2,747; 0.4%
2019	249,935; 32.6%	323,402; 42.2%	107,624; 14.1%	66,790; 8.7%	14,182; 1.9%	—N/a	—N/a	2,472; 0.3%
2021	229,283; 30.6%	343,969; 45.9%	110,006; 14.7%	15,443; 2.1%	48,485; 6.5%	—N/a	—N/a	2,564; 0.3%
2025	293,125; 42.0%	366,390; 52.5%	20,141; 2.9%	8,199; 1.2%	6,986; 1.0%	—N/a	—N/a	2,800; 0.4%

Liberal Conservative New Democratic Green People's	Progressive Conservative (defunct) Alliance (defunct) Reform (defunct)

== 2025 ==
Electoral district	Candidates						Incumbent
Electoral district	Liberal	Conservative	NDP	Green	PPC	Other	Incumbent
Barrie South—Innisfil	John Olthuis; 25,557; 38.0%	John Brassard; 38,943; 57.8%	Andrew Harrigan; 2,130; 3.2%		Mark Sampson; 695; 1.0%		John Brassard; Barrie—Innisfil
Barrie—Springwater—Oro-Medonte	Rose Zacharias; 29,150; 44.4%	Doug Shipley; 33,949; 51.7%	Gabriela Trujillo; 1,559; 2.4%	Greg Taylor; 893; 1.4%		Michael Speers (Comm.); 158; 0.2%	Doug Shipley
Bruce—Grey—Owen Sound	Anne Marie Watson; 26,837; 40.1%	Alex Ruff; 35,484; 53.0%	Christopher Neudorf; 2,069; 3.1%	Natasha Akiwenzie; 1,447; 2.2%	Pavel Smolko; 520; 0.8%	Ann Gillies (UP); 554; 0.8%	Alex Ruff
Dufferin—Caledon	Malalai Halimi; 24,818; 35.2%	Kyle Seeback; 42,458; 60.1%	Viktor Karklins; 1,380; 2.0%	Ifra Baig; 927; 1.3%	Dympna Carolan; 752; 1.1%	Jeffrey Halsall (Ind.); 260; 0.4%	Kyle Seeback
Haliburton—Kawartha Lakes	Nell Thomas; 29,223; 38.7%	Jamie Schmale; 42,701; 56.6%	Alyea Teel; 2,625; 3.5%		Michael Penman; 954; 1.3%		Jamie Schmale; Haliburton—Kawartha Lakes—Brock
New Tecumseth—Gwillimbury	Mike Hanrahan; 24,444; 37.0%	Scot Davidson; 39,247; 59.4%	Nancy Morrison; 1,226; 1.9%	Callum McKinnon; 712; 1.1%	Paul Montague; 496; 0.8%		Scot Davidson; York—Simcoe
Northumberland—Clarke	John Goheen; 32,648; 45.9%	Philip Lawrence; 34,862; 49.0%	Ava Becker; 2,090; 2.9%	Christina Marie Wilson; 630; 0.9%	Lisa Bradburn; 521; 0.7%	Jody Ledgerwood (Ind.); 270 0.4%	Philip Lawrence; Northumberland—Peterborough South
Northumberland—Clarke	John Goheen; 32,648; 45.9%	Philip Lawrence; 34,862; 49.0%	Ava Becker; 2,090; 2.9%	Christina Marie Wilson; 630; 0.9%	Lisa Bradburn; 521; 0.7%	John Wesselius (CHP); 171 0.2%	Philip Lawrence; Northumberland—Peterborough South
Peterborough	Emma Harrison; 42,890; 54.3%	Michelle Ferreri; 32,446; 41.0%	Heather Ray; 2,406; 3.0%	Jazmine Raine; 655; 0.8%	Jami-Leigh McMaster; 272; 0.3%	Matthew Grove (CHP); 168 0.2%	Michelle Ferreri; Peterborough—Kawartha
Peterborough	Emma Harrison; 42,890; 54.3%	Michelle Ferreri; 32,446; 41.0%	Heather Ray; 2,406; 3.0%	Jazmine Raine; 655; 0.8%	Jami-Leigh McMaster; 272; 0.3%	Chad Jewell (Ind.); 222 0.3%	Michelle Ferreri; Peterborough—Kawartha
Simcoe—Grey	Bren Munro; 29,455; 43.4%	Terry Dowdall; 35,364; 52.1%	Jasleen Bains; 1,574; 2.3%	Allan Kuhn; 991; 1.5%	Giorgio Mammoliti; 523; 0.8%		Terry Dowdall
Simcoe North	Ryan Rocca; 29,767; 44.7%	Adam Chambers; 32,241; 48.4%	Melissa Lloyd; 2,508; 3.8%	Ray Little; 1,260; 1.9%	Stephen Toivo Makk; 638; 1.0%	Russ Emo (CHP); 191; 0.3%	Adam Chambers

== 2021 ==
Electoral district	Candidates						Incumbent
Electoral district	Liberal	Conservative	NDP	Green	PPC	Other	Incumbent
Barrie—Innisfil	Lisa-Marie Wilson; 15,292; 28.89%	John Brassard; 25,234; 47.67%	Aleesha Gostkowski; 8,349; 15.77%		Corrado Brancato; 4,060; 7.67%		John Brassard
Barrie—Springwater—Oro-Medonte	Tanya Saari; 16,145; 30.91%	Doug Shipley; 23,555; 45.09%	Sarah Lochhead; 8,910; 17.06%		Chris Webb; 3,629; 6.95%		Doug Shipley
Bruce—Grey—Owen Sound	Anne Marie Watson; 14,738; 25.23%	Alex Ruff; 28,727; 49.18%	Christopher Neudorf; 7,939; 13.59%	Ashley Michelle Lawrence; 1,789; 3.06%	Anna-Marie Fosbrooke; 4,697; 8.04%	Reima Kaikkonen (Ind.); 524; 0.90%	Alex Ruff
Dufferin—Caledon	Lisa Post; 19,867; 30.30%	Kyle Seeback; 31,490; 48.02%	Samantha Sanchez; 6,866; 10.47%	Jenni Michelle Le Forestier; 2,754; 4.20%	Anthony Zambito; 4,389; 6.69%	Stephen McKendrick (Ind.); 207; 0.32%	Kyle Seeback
Haliburton—Kawartha Lakes—Brock	Judi Forbes; 15,645; 23.10%	Jamie Schmale; 35,418; 52.30%	Zac Miller; 9,730; 14.37%	Angel Godsoe; 1,696; 2.50%	Alison Davidson; 4,769; 7.04%	Gene Balfour (Libert.); 463; 0.68%	Jamie Schmale
Northumberland—Peterborough South	Alison Lester; 23,336; 33.46%	Philip Lawrence; 31,015; 44.47%	Kim McArthur-Jackson; 9,809; 14.07%	Christina Wilson; 1,764; 2.53%	Nathan Lang; 3,813; 5.47%		Philip Lawrence
Peterborough—Kawartha	Maryam Monsef; 24,664; 35.13%	Michelle Ferreri; 27,402; 39.03%	Joy Lachica; 13,302; 18.95%	Chanté White; 1,553; 2.21%	Paul Lawton; 3,073; 4.38%	Robert M. Bowers (Ind.); 218; 0.31%	Maryam Monsef
Simcoe—Grey	Bren Munro; 21,320; 27.83%	Terry Dowdall; 36,249; 47.32%	Lucas Gillies; 10,140; 13.24%	Nicholas Clayton; 2,969; 3.88%	Adam Minatel; 5,550; 7.24%	Ken Stouffer (CHP); 382; 0.50%	Terry Dowdall
Simcoe North	Cynthia Wesley-Esquimaux; 19,332; 30.39%	Adam Chambers; 27,383; 43.05%	Janet-Lynne Durnford; 9,958; 15.66%	Krystal Brooks; 1,903; 2.99%	Stephen Makk; 4,822; 7.58%	Russ Emo (CHP); 210; 0.33%	Bruce Stanton†
York—Simcoe	Daniella Johnson; 14,469; 29.04%	Scot Davidson; 24,900; 49.97%	Benjamin Jenkins; 6,800; 13.65%		Michael Lotter; 3,662; 7.35%		Scot Davidson

== 2019 ==
Electoral district	Candidates						Incumbent
Electoral district	Conservative	Liberal	NDP	Green	PPC	Other	Incumbent
Barrie—Innisfil	John Brassard; 23,765; 43.8%	Lisa-Marie Wilson; 15,879; 29.3%	Pekka Reinio; 8,880; 16.4%	Bonnie North; 4,716; 8.7%	Stephanie Robinson; 1013; 1.9%		John Brassard
Barrie—Springwater—Oro-Medonte (judicial recount)	Doug Shipley; 20,981; 39.0%	Brian Kalliecharan; 16,805; 31.2%	Dan Janssen; 7,972; 14.8%	Marty Lancaster; 7,066; 13.1%	David Patterson; 969; 1.8%		Alex Nuttall
Bruce—Grey—Owen Sound	Alex Ruff; 26,830; 46.1%	Michael Den Tandt; 17,485; 30.1%	Chris Stephen; 6,797; 11.7%	Danielle Valiquette; 5,114; 8.8%	Bill Townsend; 1,614; 2.8%	Daniel Little (Libert.); 321; 0.6%	Larry Miller
Dufferin—Caledon	Kyle Seeback; 28,852; 42.0%	Michele Fisher; 22,645; 33.0%	Allison Brown; 7,981; 11.6%	Stefan Wieson; 7,303; 10.6%	Chad Ransom; 1,516; 2.2%	Russ Emo (CHP); 319; 0.5%	David Tilson
Durham	Erin O'Toole; 30,752; 42.1%	Jonathan Jiancroce; 23,547; 32.2%	Sarah Whalen-Wright; 13,323; 18.2%	Evan Price; 3,950; 5.4%	Brenda Virtue; 1,442; 2.0%		Erin O'Toole
Haliburton— Kawartha Lakes—Brock	Jamie Schmale; 32,257; 49.1%	Judi Forbes; 17,067; 26.0%	Barbara Doyle; 9,676; 14.7%	Elizabeth Fraser; 5,515; 8.4%	Gene Balfour; 1,245; 1.9%		Jamie Schmale
Newmarket—Aurora	Lois Brown; 23,252; 42.61%	Tony Van Bynen; 26,488; 43.1%	Yvonne Kelly; 6,576; 10.7%	Walter Bauer; 3,551; 5.8%	Andrew McCaughtrie; 588; 1.0%	Others Dorian Baxter (PC); 901; 1.5% Laurie Goble (Rhino); 104; 0.2%	Kyle Peterson
Northumberland— Peterborough South	Philip Lawrence; 27,385; 39.7%	Kim Rudd; 24,977; 36.2%	Mallory MacDonald; 9,615; 13.9%	Jeff Wheeldon; 5,524; 8.0%	Frank Vaughan; 1,460; 2.1%		Kim Rudd
Peterborough—Kawartha	Michael Skinner; 24,096; 34.9%	Maryam Monsef; 27,400; 39.2%	Candace Shaw; 11,872; 17.0%	Andrew MacGregor; 4,930; 7.0%	Alexander Murphy; 890; 1.3%	Others Robert M. Bowers (Independent); 180; 0.3% Ken Ranney (Stop Climate Change); 172; 0.3%	Maryam Monsef
Simcoe—Grey	Terry Dowdall; 32,812; 43.5%	Lorne Kenney; 23,925; 31.7%	Ilona Matthews; 8,462; 11.2%	Sherri Jackson; 8,589; 11.4%%	Richard Sommer; 1,416; 1.9%	Tony D'Angelo (VCP); 305; 0.4%	Kellie Leitch
Simcoe North	Bruce Stanton; 27,241; 43.4%	Gerry Hawes; 19,310; 30.8%	Angelique Belcourt; 8,850; 14.1%	Valerie Powell; 5,882; 9.4%	Stephen Makk; 1,154; 1.8%	Chris Brown (CHP); 341; 0.5%	Bruce Stanton
York—Simcoe	Scot Davidson; 24,918; 46.3%	Cynthia Wesley-Esquimaux; 14,407; 26.8%	Jessa McLean; 7,620; 14.2%	Jonathan Arnold; 4,650; 8.6%	Michael Lotter; 875; 1.6%	Keith Komar (Libert.); 1,311; 2.4%	Scot Davidson (Note: Elected in a by-election.)

== 2015 ==
Electoral district	Candidates					Incumbent
Electoral district	Conservative	NDP	Liberal	Green	Other	Incumbent
Barrie—Innisfil	John Brassard; 22,901; 46.41%	Myrna Clark; 5,812; 11.78%	Colin Wilson; 18,308; 37.11%	Bonnie North; 1,991; 4.04%	Gary Nail (CHP); 199 0.40%	Vacant; Barrie
Barrie—Innisfil	John Brassard; 22,901; 46.41%	Myrna Clark; 5,812; 11.78%	Colin Wilson; 18,308; 37.11%	Bonnie North; 1,991; 4.04%	Jeff Sakula (CAP); 130 0.26%	Vacant; Barrie
Barrie—Springwater—Oro-Medonte (judicial recount)	Alex Nuttall; 21,091; 41.74%	Ellen White; 5,202; 10.29%	Brian Tamblyn; 21,005; 41.57%	Marty Lancaster; 2,648; 5.24%	Ram Faerber (Ind.); 188 0.37%	New district
Barrie—Springwater—Oro-Medonte (judicial recount)	Alex Nuttall; 21,091; 41.74%	Ellen White; 5,202; 10.29%	Brian Tamblyn; 21,005; 41.57%	Marty Lancaster; 2,648; 5.24%	Darren Roskam (Libert.); 401 0.79%	New district
Bruce—Grey—Owen Sound	Larry Miller; 26,297; 46.68%	David McLaren; 6,270; 11.13%	Kimberley Love; 21,879; 38.84%	Chris Albinati; 1,887; 3.35%		Larry Miller
Dufferin—Caledon	David Allan Tilson; 27,977; 46.28%	Rehya Yazbek; 4,398; 7.28%	Ed Crewson; 23,643; 39.11%	Nancy Urekar; 4,433; 7.33%		David Tilson
Durham	Erin O'Toole; 28,967; 45.13%	Derek Spence; 10,289; 16.03%	Corinna Traill; 22,949; 35.75%	Stacey Leadbetter; 1,616; 2.52%	Andrew Moriarity (CHP); 364; 0.57%	Erin O'Toole
Haliburton— Kawartha Lakes—Brock	Jamie Schmale; 27,718; 44.83%	Mike Perry; 12,012; 19.43%	David Marquis; 19,634; 31.75%	Bill MacCallum; 2,470; 3.99%		Barry Devolin†
Newmarket—Aurora	Lois Brown; 24,057; 42.61%	Yvonne Kelly; 4,806; 8.51%	Kyle Peterson; 25,508; 45.18%	Vanessa Long; 1,331; 2.36%	Dorian Baxter (PC); 762; 1.35%	Lois Brown
Northumberland—Peterborough South	Adam Moulton; 25,165; 39.56%	Russ Christianson; 9,411; 14.80%	Kim Rudd; 27,043; 42.51%	Patricia Sinnott; 1,990; 3.13%		Rick Norlock†; Northumberland—Quinte West
Peterborough—Kawartha	Michael Skinner; 23,335; 35.07%	Dave Nickle; 12,437; 18.69%	Maryam Monsef; 29,159; 43.82%	Doug Mason; 1,480; 2.22%	Toban Leckie (SD); 131; 0.20%	Vacant; Peterborough
Simcoe—Grey	Kellie Leitch; 30,612; 46.56%	David Matthews; 6,332; 9.63%	Mike MacEachern; 25,352; 38.56%	JoAnne Fleming; 2,923; 4.45%	Len Noordegraaf (CHP); 528; 0.80%	Kellie Leitch
Simcoe North	Bruce Stanton; 24,836; 43.52%	Richard Banigan; 6,037; 10.58%	Liz Riley; 22,718; 39.81%	Peter Stubbins; 2,543; 4.46%	Jacob Kearey-Moreland (NA) (Note: Jacob Kearey-Moreland described himself as a Cooperative Interdependence candidate.); 618 1.08%	Bruce Stanton
Simcoe North	Bruce Stanton; 24,836; 43.52%	Richard Banigan; 6,037; 10.58%	Liz Riley; 22,718; 39.81%	Peter Stubbins; 2,543; 4.46%	Scott Whittaker (CHP); 319 0.56%	Bruce Stanton
York—Simcoe	Peter Van Loan; 24,058; 50.25%	Sylvia Gerl; 4,255; 8.89%	Shaun Tanaka; 18,083; 37.77%	Mark Viitala; 1,483; 3.10%		Peter Van Loan

== 2011 ==
Electoral district	Candidates					Incumbent
Electoral district	Conservative	Liberal	NDP	Green	Other	Incumbent
Barrie	Patrick Brown; 32,121; 56.70%	Colin Wilson; 9,113; 16.09%	Myrna Clark; 11,842; 20.90%	Erich Jacoby-Hawkins; 3,266; 5.77%	Christine Nugent (M-L); 82 0.14%	Patrick Brown
Barrie	Patrick Brown; 32,121; 56.70%	Colin Wilson; 9,113; 16.09%	Myrna Clark; 11,842; 20.90%	Erich Jacoby-Hawkins; 3,266; 5.77%	Darren Roskam (Libert.); 150 0.26%	Patrick Brown
Barrie	Patrick Brown; 32,121; 56.70%	Colin Wilson; 9,113; 16.09%	Myrna Clark; 11,842; 20.90%	Erich Jacoby-Hawkins; 3,266; 5.77%	Jeff Sakula (CAP); 77 0.14%	Patrick Brown
Bruce—Grey—Owen Sound	Larry Miller; 28,744; 56.30%	Kimberley Love; 8,203; 16.07%	Karen Gventer; 9,008; 17.64%	Emma Hogbin; 5,099; 9.99%		Larry Miller
Dufferin—Caledon	David Tilson; 28,647; 59.01%	Bill Prout; 6,361; 13.10%	Leslie Parsons; 6,409; 13.20%	Ard Van Leeuwen; 7,132; 14.69%		David Tilson
Durham	Bev Oda; 31,737; 54.55%	Grant Humes; 10,387; 17.85%	Tammy Schoep; 12,277; 21.10%	Stephen Leahy; 3,134; 5.39%	Blaize Barnicoat (Libert.); 187 0.32%	Bev Oda
Durham	Bev Oda; 31,737; 54.55%	Grant Humes; 10,387; 17.85%	Tammy Schoep; 12,277; 21.10%	Stephen Leahy; 3,134; 5.39%	Andrew Moriarity (CHP); 462 0.79%	Bev Oda
Haliburton— Kawartha Lakes—Brock	Barry Devolin; 35,192; 60.03%	Laura Redman; 7,539; 12.86%	Lyn Edwards; 12,934; 22.06%	Susanne Lauten; 2,963; 5.05%		Barry Devolin
Newmarket—Aurora	Lois Brown; 31,600; 54.29%	Kyle Peterson; 13,908; 23.90%	Kassandra Bidarian; 8,886; 15.27%	Vanessa Long; 2,628; 4.52%	Dorian Baxter (PC); 998 1.71%	Lois Brown
Newmarket—Aurora	Lois Brown; 31,600; 54.29%	Kyle Peterson; 13,908; 23.90%	Kassandra Bidarian; 8,886; 15.27%	Vanessa Long; 2,628; 4.52%	Yvonne Mackie (AAEVP); 182 0.31%	Lois Brown
Northumberland— Quinte West	Rick Norlock; 32,853; 53.83%	Kim Rudd; 12,822; 21.01%	Russ Christianson; 12,626; 20.69%	Ralph Torrie; 2,733; 4.48%		Rick Norlock
Peterborough	Dean Del Mastro; 29,393; 49.67%	Betsy McGregor; 12,664; 21.40%	Dave Nickle; 14,723; 24.88%	Michael Bell; 2,105; 3.56%	Michael Bates (CAP); 104 0.18%	Dean Del Mastro
Peterborough	Dean Del Mastro; 29,393; 49.67%	Betsy McGregor; 12,664; 21.40%	Dave Nickle; 14,723; 24.88%	Michael Bell; 2,105; 3.56%	Gordon Scott (Ind.); 189 0.32%	Dean Del Mastro
Simcoe—Grey	Kellie Leitch; 31,784; 49.37%	Alex Smardenka; 8,207; 12.75%	Katy Austin; 11,185; 17.38%	Jace Metheral; 3,482; 5.41%	Gord Cochrane (CAP); 244 0.38%	Helena Guergis
Simcoe—Grey	Kellie Leitch; 31,784; 49.37%	Alex Smardenka; 8,207; 12.75%	Katy Austin; 11,185; 17.38%	Jace Metheral; 3,482; 5.41%	Helena Guergis (Ind.); 8,714 13.54%	Helena Guergis
Simcoe—Grey	Kellie Leitch; 31,784; 49.37%	Alex Smardenka; 8,207; 12.75%	Katy Austin; 11,185; 17.38%	Jace Metheral; 3,482; 5.41%	Peter Vander Zaag (CHP); 757 1.18%	Helena Guergis
Simcoe North	Bruce Stanton; 31,581; 54.45%	Steve Clarke; 11,090; 19.12%	Richard Banigan; 11,515; 19.85%	Valerie Powell; 3,489; 6.02%	Adrian Kooger (CHP); 322; 0.56%	Bruce Stanton
York—Simcoe	Peter Van Loan; 33,614; 63.58%	Cynthia Wesley-Esquimaux; 5,702; 10.79%	Sylvia Gerl; 10,190; 19.28%	John Dewar; 2,851; 5.39%	Vicki Gunn (CHP); 352 0.67%	Peter Van Loan
York—Simcoe	Peter Van Loan; 33,614; 63.58%	Cynthia Wesley-Esquimaux; 5,702; 10.79%	Sylvia Gerl; 10,190; 19.28%	John Dewar; 2,851; 5.39%	Paul Pisani (United); 157 0.30%	Peter Van Loan

== 2008 ==
Electoral district	Candidates						Incumbent
Electoral district	Conservative	Liberal	NDP	Green	Christian Heritage	Other	Incumbent
Barrie	Patrick Brown; 27,927; 52.37%	Rick Jones; 12,732; 23.88%	Myrna Clark; 6,403; 12.01%	Erich Jacoby-Hawkins; 5,921; 11.10%		Paolo Fabrizio (Libert.); 260 0.49%	Patrick Brown
Barrie	Patrick Brown; 27,927; 52.37%	Rick Jones; 12,732; 23.88%	Myrna Clark; 6,403; 12.01%	Erich Jacoby-Hawkins; 5,921; 11.10%		Christine Anne Nugent (M-L); 84 0.16%	Patrick Brown
Bruce— Grey— Owen Sound	Larry Miller; 22,975; 47.66%	Thom Noble; 6,892; 14.30%	Jill McIllwraith; 4,640; 9.63%	Dick Hibma; 13,095; 27.17%	Joel Kidd; 599; 1.24%		Larry Miller
Dufferin—Caledon	David Tilson; 23,363; 53.21%	Rebecca Finch; 8,495; 19.35%	Jason Bissett; 4,385; 9.99%	Ard Van Leeuwen; 7,377; 16.80%		Dean Woods (CAP); 284; 0.65%	David Tilson
Durham	Bev Oda; 28,551; 54.05%	Bryan Ransom; 12,167; 23.03%	Andrew McKeever; 5,485; 10.38%	Stephen Leahy; 6,041; 11.44%	Henry Zekveld; 577; 1.09%		Bev Oda
Haliburton— Kawartha Lakes— Brock	Barry Devolin; 30,391; 55.95%	Marlene White; 11,093; 20.42%	Stephen Yardy; 7,952; 14.64%	Michael Bell; 4,505; 8.29%	Dave Switzer; 374; 0.69%		Barry Devolin
Newmarket—Aurora	Lois Brown; 24,873; 46.70%	Tim Jones; 18,250; 34.27%	Mike Seaward; 4,548; 8.54%	Glenn Hubbers; 4,381; 8.23%	Ray Luff; 205; 0.38%	Dorian Baxter (PC); 1,004; 1.89%	Belinda Stronach†
Northumberland— Quinte West	Rick Norlock; 27,615; 48.71%	Paul Macklin; 16,209; 28.59%	Russ Christianson; 8,230; 14.52%	Ralph Torrie; 4,633; 8.17%			Rick Norlock
Peterborough	Dean Del Mastro; 27,630; 47.40%	Betsy McGregor; 18,417; 31.60%	Steve Sharpe; 8,115; 13.92%	Emily Berrigan; 4,029; 6.91%		Elaine Couto (M-L); 98; 0.17%	Dean Del Mastro
Simcoe—Grey	Helena Guergis; 30,897; 55.05%	Andrea Matrosovs; 12,099; 21.56%	Katy Austin; 6,288; 11.20%	Peter Ellis; 5,685; 10.13%	Peter Vander Zaag; 1,018; 1.81%	Caley McKibbin (Libert.); 143; 0.25%	Helena Guergis
Simcoe North	Bruce Stanton; 26,328; 49.66%	Steve Clarke; 14,670; 27.67%	Richard Banigan; 6,202; 11.70%	Valerie Powell; 5,821; 10.98%			Bruce Stanton
York—Simcoe	Peter Van Loan; 27,412; 56.70%	Judith Moses; 9,044; 18.71%	Sylvia Gerl; 5,882; 12.17%	John Dewar; 4,887; 10.11%	Vicki Gunn; 444; 0.92%	Paul Pisani (PC); 676; 1.40%	Peter Van Loan

== 2006 ==
Electoral district	Candidates					Incumbent
Electoral district	Liberal	Conservative	NDP	Green	Other	Incumbent
Barrie	Aileen Carroll; 22,456; 39.18%	Patrick Brown; 23,999; 41.88%	Peter Bursztyn; 6,978; 12.18%	Erich Jacoby-Hawkins; 3,875; 6.76%		Aileen Carroll
Bruce—Grey—Owen Sound	Verona Jackson; 14,378; 27.56%	Larry Miller; 25,133; 48.18%	Jill McIllwraith; 5,918; 11.34%	Shane Jolley; 6,735; 12.91%		Larry Miller
Dufferin—Caledon	Garry Moore; 14,777; 29.97%	David Tilson; 23,641; 47.94%	Chris Marquis; 5,983; 12.13%	Ted Alexander; 4,912; 9.96%		David Tilson
Durham	Doug Moffatt; 17,290; 30.01%	Bev Oda; 27,087; 47.02%	Bruce Rogers; 9,946; 17.26%	Virginia Ervin; 2,676; 4.64%	Henry Zekveld (CHP); 612; 1.06%	Bev Oda
Haliburton—Kawartha Lakes—Brock	Greg Walling; 17,266; 28.75%	Barry Devolin; 29,427; 49.00%	Anne MacDermid; 10,340; 17.22%	Andy Harjula; 3,017; 5.02%		Barry Devolin
Newmarket—Aurora	Belinda Stronach; 27,176; 46.21%	Lois Brown; 22,376; 38.05%	Ed Chudak; 5,639; 9.59%	Glenn Hubbers; 2,813; 4.78%	Dorian Baxter (PC); 729 1.24%	Belinda Stronach
Newmarket—Aurora	Belinda Stronach; 27,176; 46.21%	Lois Brown; 22,376; 38.05%	Ed Chudak; 5,639; 9.59%	Glenn Hubbers; 2,813; 4.78%	Peter Maloney (CAP); 79 0.13%	Belinda Stronach
Northumberland—Quinte West	Paul Macklin; 22,566; 36.00%	Rick Norlock; 25,833; 41.21%	Russ Christianson; 11,334; 18.08%	Patricia Lawson; 2,946; 4.70%		Paul Macklin
Peterborough	Diane Lloyd; 20,532; 32.37%	Dean Del Mastro; 22,774; 35.90%	Linda Slavin; 16,286; 25.68%	Brent Wood; 3,205; 5.05%	Bob Bowers (Ind.); 179 0.28%	Peter Adams†
Peterborough	Diane Lloyd; 20,532; 32.37%	Dean Del Mastro; 22,774; 35.90%	Linda Slavin; 16,286; 25.68%	Brent Wood; 3,205; 5.05%	Aiden Wiechula (Mar.); 455 0.72%	Peter Adams†
Simcoe—Grey	Elizabeth Kirley; 18,689; 30.86%	Helena Guergis; 30,135; 49.76%	Katy Austin; 6,784; 11.20%	Peter Ellis; 3,372; 5.57%	Peter Vander Zaag (CHP); 1,585; 2.62%	Helena Guergis
Simcoe North	Karen Graham; 22,078; 38.37%	Bruce Stanton; 23,266; 40.43%	Jen Hill; 8,132; 14.13%	Sandy Agnew; 3,451; 6.00%	Adrian Peter Kooger (CHP); 617; 1.07%	Paul DeVillers†
York—Simcoe	Kate Wilson; 16,456; 30.70%	Peter Van Loan; 25,685; 47.93%	Sylvia Gerl; 7,139; 13.32%	John Dewar; 3,719; 6.94%	Vicki Gunn (CHP); 595; 1.11%	Peter Van Loan

== 2004 ==
Electoral district	Candidates						Incumbent
Electoral district	Liberal	Conservative	NDP	Green	Christian Heritage	Other	Incumbent
Barrie	Aileen Carroll; 21,233; 42.66%	Patrick Brown; 19,938; 40.06%	Peter Bursztyn; 5,312; 10.67%	Erich Jacoby-Hawkins; 3,288; 6.61%			Aileen Carroll; Barrie—Simcoe—Bradford
Clarington—Scugog—Uxbridge	Tim Lang; 19,548; 38.27%	Bev Oda; 20,813; 40.74%	Bruce Rogers; 7,721; 15.11%	Virginia Ervin; 2,085; 4.08%	Durk Bruinsma; 915; 1.79%		Alex Shepherd; Durham
Dufferin—Caledon	Murray Calder; 17,557; 39.00%	David Tilson; 19,270; 42.81%	Rita Landry; 3,798; 8.44%	Ted Alexander; 3,947; 8.77%	Ursula Ellis; 443; 0.98%		Murray Calder; Dufferin—Peel—Wellington—Grey
Grey—Bruce—Owen Sound	Ovid Jackson; 17,824; 35.78%	Larry Miller; 22,411; 44.99%	Sebastian Ostertag; 6,516; 13.08%	Alex Drossos; 2,076; 4.17%	Steven J. Taylor; 982; 1.97%		Ovid Jackson
Haliburton—Kawartha Lakes—Brock	John O'Reilly; 19,294; 34.51%	Barry Devolin; 24,731; 44.23%	Gil J. McElroy; 8,427; 15.07%	Tim Holland; 2,637; 4.72%	Peter Vogel; 493; 0.88%	Charles Olito (Ind.); 330; 0.59%	John O'Reilly; Haliburton—Victoria—Brock
Newmarket—Aurora	Martha Hall Findlay; 21,129; 41.08%	Belinda Stronach; 21,818; 42.42%	Ed Chudak; 5,111; 9.94%	Daryl Wyatt; 2,298; 4.47%		Dorian Baxter (PC); 1,079; 2.10%	New district
Northumberland—Quinte West	Paul Macklin; 22,989; 39.85%	Doug Galt; 22,676; 39.31%	Russ Christianson; 9,007; 15.61%	Steve Haylestrom; 3,016; 5.23%			Paul Macklin; Northumberland
Peterborough	Peter Adams; 25,099; 43.55%	James Jackson; 18,393; 31.92%	Linda Slavin; 10,957; 19.01%	Brent Wood; 3,182; 5.52%			Peter Adams
Simcoe—Grey	Paul Bonwick; 22,396; 40.44%	Helena Guergis; 22,496; 40.62%	Colin Mackinnon; 5,532; 9.99%	Peter Ellis; 2,668; 4.82%	Peter Vander Zaag; 2,285; 4.13%		Paul Bonwick
Simcoe North	Paul DeVillers; 23,664; 43.36%	Peter Stock; 20,570; 37.69%	Jen Hill; 6,162; 11.29%	Mary Lou Kirby; 3,486; 6.39%	Adrian Kooger; 544; 1.00%	Ian Woods (CAP); 145; 0.27%	Paul DeVillers
York—Simcoe	Kate Wilson; 16,763; 35.47%	Peter Van Loan; 21,343; 45.17%	Sylvia Gerl; 5,314; 11.25%	Bob Burrows; 2,576; 5.45%	Vicki Gunn; 588; 1.24%	Stephen Sircelj (PC); 670; 1.42%	Karen Kraft Sloan; York North

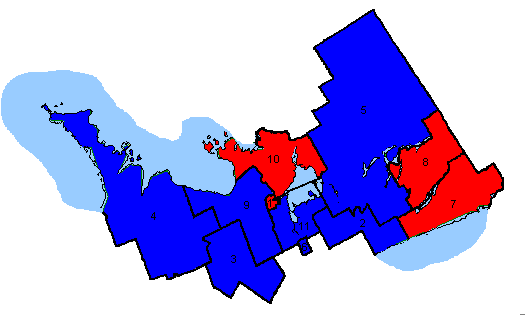
Key map

1. Barrie
2. Durham
3. Dufferin-Caledon
4. Bruce-Grey-Owen Sound
5. Haliburton-Kawartha Lakes-Brock
6. Newmarket-Aurora
7. Northumberland-Qunte West
8. Peterborough
9. Simcoe-Grey
10. Simcoe North
11. York-Simcoe

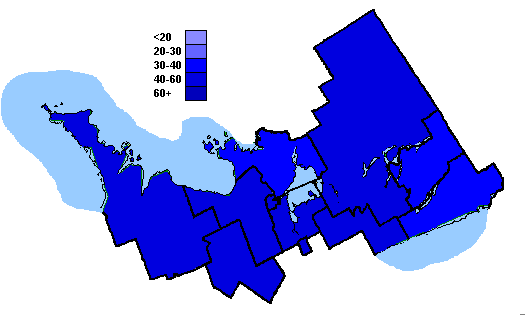
Conservative Party of Canada

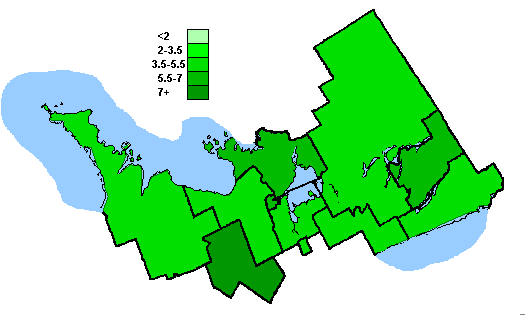
Green Party of Canada

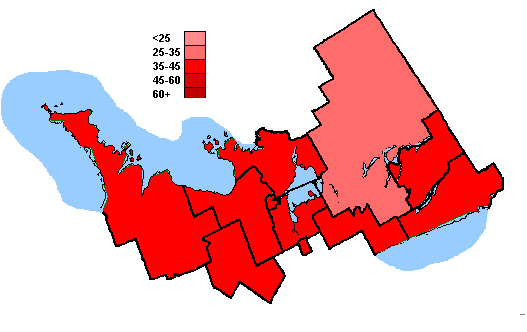
Liberal Party of Canada

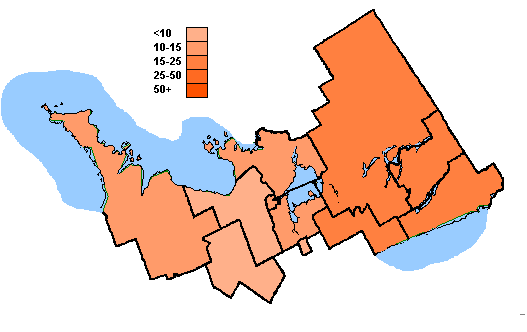
New Democratic Party

== 2000 ==
Electoral district	Candidates					Incumbent
Electoral district	Liberal	Canadian Alliance	NDP	PC	Other	Incumbent
Barrie—Simcoe—Bradford	Aileen Carroll; 26,309; 48.27%	Rob Hamilton; 17,600; 32.29%	Keith Lindsay; 2,385; 4.38%	Jane MacLaren; 7,588; 13.92%	Brian K. White (NA); 234 0.43% Ian Woods (CAP); 387 0.71%	Aileen Carroll
Bruce—Grey—Owen Sound	Ovid L. Jackson; 19,817; 44.22%	Murray Peer; 15,960; 35.61%	Karen Gventer; 2,166; 4.83%	Allen Wilford; 6,872; 15.33%		Ovid Jackson
Dufferin—Peel—Wellington—Grey	Murray Calder; 21,678; 45.57%	Don Crawford; 15,028; 31.59%	Mitchel Healey; 1,473; 3.10%	Richard Majkot; 7,926; 16.66%	Robert Strang (Green); 1,464; 3.08%	Murray Calder
Durham	Alex Shepherd; 20,602; 45.20%	Gerry Skipwith; 13,743; 30.15%	Ken Ranney; 2,545; 5.58%	Sam Cureatz; 8,367; 18.36%	Durk Bruinsma (NA); 326; 0.72%	Alex Shepherd
Haliburton—Victoria—Brock	John O'Reilly; 16,710; 33.95%	Pat Dunn; 15,591; 31.68%	Rick Denyer; 2,409; 4.89%	Laurie Scott; 14,508; 29.48%		John O'Reilly
Northumberland	Paul Harold Macklin; 20,109; 45.90%	Rick Norlock; 11,410; 26.05%	Ben Burd; 2,141; 4.89%	Ralph James Zarboni; 8,768; 20.02%	Tom Lawson (Green); 1,102 2.52% Gail Thompson (CAP); 276 0.63%	Christine Stewart
Peterborough	Peter Adams; 25,310; 48.41%	Eric John Allan Mann; 14,924; 28.54%	Herb Wiseman; 3,967; 7.59%	Darrin Langen; 7,034; 13.45%	Bob Bowers (Ind.); 147 0.28% Tim Holland (Green); 903 1.73%	Peter Adams
Simcoe—Grey	Paul Bonwick; 22,224; 44.77%	George Demery; 16,113; 32.46%	Michael Kennedy; 1,646; 3.32%	Bill Dunkley; 8,655; 17.44%	Victor Carvalho (NA); 246 0.50% James Wilson McGillivray (CAP); 751 1.51%	Paul Bonwick
Simcoe North	Paul DeVillers; 24,510; 50.76%	Peter Stock; 14,283; 29.58%	Ann Billings; 2,272; 4.71%	Lucy Stewart; 6,914; 14.32%	Adrian P. Kooger (NA); 305; 0.63%	Paul Devillers
York North	Karen Kraft Sloan; 22,665; 46.50%	Bob Yaciuk; 11,985; 24.59%	Ian Scott; 1,696; 3.48%	Joe Wamback; 11,890; 24.39%	Ian Knight (NA); 509; 1.04%	Karen Kraft Sloan

== 1997 ==
Electoral district	Candidates					Incumbent
Electoral district	Liberal	Reform	NDP	PC	Other	Incumbent
Barrie—Simcoe—Bradford	Aileen Carroll; 23,549	Bonnie Ainsworth; 16,042	Peggy Mccomb; 2,580	John Trotter; 10,735	1,254	New district
Bruce—Grey	Ovid Jackson; 17,896	Murray Peer; 16,161	Colleen Anne Purdon; 3,446	John Middlebro'; 11,139		Ovid Jackson
Dufferin—Peel—Wellington—Grey	Murray Calder; 20,957	Dave Davies; 14,760	Kevin Kelly; 2,355	Eleanor Taylor; 11,089		Murray Calder; Wellington—Grey—Dufferin—Simcoe
Durham	Alex Shepherd; 19,878	Ian Smyth; 13,059	Colin Argyle; 3,250	Sam Cureatz; 8,995	682	Alex Shepherd
Northumberland	Christine Stewart; 21,182	Al Matthews; 10,602	Murray Weppler; 2,678	Ralph Zarboni; 11,458	355	Christine Stewart
Peterborough	Peter Adams; 25,594	Nancy Branscombe; 15,759	Fred Birket; 4,874	Thomas Michael Mcmillan; 8,757		Peter Adams
Simcoe North	Paul Devillers; 22,775	Peter Stock; 14,363	Ann Billings; 2,488	Sharon Henry; 10,849	831	Paul Devillers
Simcoe—Grey	Paul Bonwick; 17,895	Paul Shaw; 17,414	Marty Wilkinson; 3,090	Shawn Mitchell; 11,761	664	Ed Harper; Simcoe Centre
Victoria—Haliburton	John O'Reilly; 18,205	Pat Dunn; 17,024	Rick Denyer; 3,456	Lorne Edward Chester; 14,283	504	John O'Reilly
York North	Karen Kraft Sloan; 22,942	Shauneen Mackay; 13,245	Laurie Cooke; 1,996	John Cole; 11,308	1,206	Karen Kraft Sloan

== 1993 ==
=== Party rankings ===
Parties	1st	2nd	3rd	4th
Liberal	8	1	0	0
Reform	1	7	1	0
Progressive Conservative	0	1	8	0
New Democratic	0	0	0	9

Electoral district	Candidates					Incumbent
Electoral district	Liberal	Reform	NDP	PC	Other	Incumbent
Bruce—Grey	Ovid Jackson; 25,689	Alan Aston; 12,938	Cathy Hird; 2,259	Stew O'Keeffe; 9,835	1,628	Gus Mitges
Durham	Alex Shepherd; 22,383	Ian Smyth; 18,543	Lucy Rybka-Becker; 2,529	K. Ross Stevenson; 14,940	2,497	K. Ross Stevenson
Northumberland	Christine Stewart; 23,986	Gord Johnston; 11,512	Diana Stewart; 1,667	Reg Jewell; 10,199	1,049	Christine Stewart
Peterborough	Peter Adams; 27,575	Len Bangma; 13,457	Merv Richards; 3,056	Bill Domm; 11,623	2,219	Bill Domm
Simcoe Centre	Janice Laking; 25,264	Ed Harper; 25,446	Pat Peters; 1,872	Doug Jagges; 11,644	2,896	Edna Anderson
Simcoe North	Paul Devillers; 23,116	Ray Lyons; 17,498	Marsha Mitzak; 1,956	Doug Lewis; 13,141	1,212	Doug Lewis
Victoria—Haliburton	John O'Reilly; 20,511	Barry Devolin; 15,906	Cathy Vainio; 2,046	Lorne Edward Chester; 12,378	4,991	William C. Scott
Wellington—Grey—Dufferin—Simcoe	Murray Calder; 20,415	Bob Greenland; 15,400	Dan Heffernan; 2,000	Perrin Beatty; 18,645	563	Perrin Beatty
York—Simcoe	Karen Kraft Sloan; 26,932	Paul Pivato; 22,305	Steve Pliakes; 1,709	John Cole; 16,114	2,132	John Cole

== 1988 ==
=== Party rankings ===
The Liberals flipped Northumberland with a razor-thin 28 votes majority over the Progressive Conservatives, who won the other 8 seats.

Parties	1st	2nd	3rd
Progressive Conservative	8	1	0
Liberal	1	8	0
New Democratic	0	0	9

Electoral district	Candidates				Incumbent
Electoral district	PC	Liberal	NDP	Other	Incumbent
Bruce—Grey	Gus Mitges; 19,748	Douglas M. Thompson; 18,796	Cathy Hird; 9,183	584	Gary Gurbin; Bruce—Grey
Bruce—Grey	Gus Mitges; 19,748	Douglas M. Thompson; 18,796	Cathy Hird; 9,183	584	Merged districts
Bruce—Grey	Gus Mitges; 19,748	Douglas M. Thompson; 18,796	Cathy Hird; 9,183	584	Gus Mitges; Grey—Simcoe
Durham	K. Ross Stevenson; 24,065	Doug Moffatt; 15,083	Margaret Wilbur; 10,334	2,305	Allan Lawrence; Durham—Northumberland
Northumberland	Reg Jewell; 18,572	Christine Stewart; 18,600	Gord Barnes; 6,498	1,565	George Hees
Peterborough	Bill Domm; 22,492	Barry Macdougall; 16,693	Gill Sandeman; 15,147	723	Bill Domm
Simcoe Centre	Edna Anderson; 23,504	Jack Ramsay; 17,233	Judy Watson; 8,380	2,685	Ronald Stewart; Simcoe South
Simcoe North	Doug Lewis; 21,847	Alan Martin; 18,755	Mike Mcmurter; 8,995		Doug Lewis
Victoria—Haliburton	William C. Scott; 22,270	Bruce Glass; 16,549	Cathy Vainio; 8,203	546	William C. Scott
Wellington—Grey—Dufferin—Simcoe	Perrin Beatty; 26,066	Murray Calder; 15,494	Shirley Farlinger; 7,746	1,918	Perrin Beatty; Wellington—Dufferin—Simcoe
York—Simcoe	John Cole; 26,732	Frank Stronach; 19,906	Judy Darcy; 7,489	2,538	Sinclair Stevens; York—Peel

== 1984 ==
=== Party rankings ===
The Progressive Conservatives swept the region, winning everywhere with significant majorities. The Liberals arrived second in every riding in the region, with the NDP third.

Parties	1st	2nd	3rd
Progressive Conservative	10	0	0
Liberal	0	10	0
New Democratic	0	0	10

Electoral district	Candidates				Incumbent
Electoral district	PC	Liberal	NDP	Other	Incumbent
Bruce—Grey	Gary Gurbin; 27,611	Ron Oswald; 9,931	Norma Peterson; 5,112		Gary Gurbin
Durham—Northumberland	Allan Lawrence; 24,968	Darce Campbell; 8,740	Roy Grierson; 7,805	564	Allan Lawrence
Grey—Simcoe	Gus Mitges; 23,342	Joe Sheffer; 9,369	Joan Stone; 6,001	337	Gus Mitges
Northumberland	George Hees; 24,060	John L. Hill; 9,534	Bill Cassells; 4,633	400	George Hees
Peterborough	Bill Domm; 27,121	Barry Macdougall; 11,737	Linda Slavin; 10,648	1,963	Bill Domm
Simcoe North	Doug Lewis; 24,887	Alan Gray Martin; 12,062	Tim Tynan; 7,742	591	Doug Lewis
Simcoe South	Ronald Stewart; 30,702	Bruce Owen; 13,906	Frank Berry; 8,283		Ronald Stewart
Victoria—Haliburton	William C. Scott; 30,229	Bruce Glass; 10,032	Patrick Daniel; 8,682	663	William C. Scott
Wellington—Dufferin—Simcoe	Perrin Beatty; 29,983	John Green; 7,303	Sandy W.A. Young; 6,468		Perrin Beatty
York—Peel	Sinclair Stevens; 37,493	Pam Mcpherson; 12,538	John Hall; 9,353	917	Sinclair Stevens
