= Canadian House of Commons Standing Committee on Indigenous and Northern Affairs =

Standing committee of the House of Commons of Canada

The House of Commons Standing Committee on Indigenous and Northern Affairs (INAN) is a standing committee of the House of Commons of Canada. It was formerly known as the House of Commons Standing Committee on Aboriginal Affairs and Northern Development.

== Mandate ==
The Standing Committee on Indigenous and Northern Affairs was established by the then new Department of Indian Affairs and Northern Development (now Indigenous Services Canada and Crown–Indigenous Relations and Northern Affairs Canada), in 1968. Although the mandate has changed many times, it is current, as of the 43rd Parliament.

The committee may study any issue of the department's management and operation, as well as any legislation, programs or policy areas. The department has taken responsibility primarily for on-reserve registered First Nations people, Inuit and northern or territorial affairs including considered legislation and issues related to these populations and subjects. The committee can also examine issues, policies and programs related to off-reserve registered and non-registered First Nations people, Métis, and Inuit. and, as of 2004, the Minister of Indigenous and Northern Affairs, now Minister of Crown–Indigenous Relations has been assigned the additional role of Federal Interlocutor for Métis and Non-Status Indians.

== Membership ==
As of the 45th Canadian Parliament:

Party	Member	Riding
Liberal	Terry Sheehan, chair	Sault Ste. Marie—Algoma, ON
Conservative	Jamie Schmale, vice chair	Haliburton—Kawartha Lakes, ON
Bloc Québécois	Marilène Gill, vice chair	Côte-Nord—Kawawachikamach—Nitassinan, QC
Liberal	Jaime Battiste	Cape Breton—Canso—Antigonish, NS
Conservative	Marc Dalton	Pitt Meadows—Maple Ridge, BC
Liberal	Philip Earle	Labrador, NL
Liberal	Brendan Hanley	Yukon, YT
Liberal	Lori Idlout	Nunavut, NU
Liberal	Ginette Lavack	St. Boniface—St. Vital, MB
Conservative	Billy Morin	Edmonton Northwest, AB
Liberal	Tanveer Shahnawaz	Beaches—East York, ON
Conservative	Bob Zimmer	Prince George—Peace River—Northern Rockies, BC

=== Sub-Committees ===
- Subcommittee on Agenda and Procedure (SINA)
