= William Rae Tomlinson =

Canadian politician (1902–1979)

Member of Parliament for Bruce
- In office October 1935 – April 1945
- Preceded by: riding created
- Succeeded by: Andrew Ernest Robinson

Personal details
- Born: William Rae Tomlinson; 24 January 1902 Seneca Township, Ontario, Canada
- Died: 31 December 1979 (aged 77) Owen Sound, Ontario, Canada
- Party: Liberal
- Spouse(s): Lucille Peers m. 18 June 1927
- Profession: barrister

William Rae Tomlinson (24 January 1902 – 31 December 1979) was a Liberal party member of the House of Commons of Canada. He was born in Seneca Township, Ontario and became a barrister by career.

He attended high school at Caledonia, then proceeded to law studies at Osgoode Hall Law School. He was appointed King's Counsel in 1937.

He was first elected to Parliament at the Bruce riding in the 1935 general election and re-elected there in 1940. After completing his term in the 19th Canadian Parliament, Tomlinson did not seek re-election in 1945.
