= Ross Whicher =

Canadian politician

Ross Mackenzie Whicher

Member of the Canadian Parliament for Bruce
- In office September 12, 1968 – May 9, 1974
- Preceded by: John Loney
- Succeeded by: Crawford Douglas

Personal details
- Born: February 13, 1918 Wiarton, Ontario
- Died: April 19, 2002 (aged 84) Wiarton, Ontario
- Party: Liberal Party of Canada

Ross MacKenzie Whicher (February 13, 1918 – April 19, 2002) was a Canadian politician and businessman.

Whicher served in World War II with the 4th anti-tank regiment of the Canadian military. Following the war, he returned home and opened the Wiarton Dairy, operating it for several decades.

Whicher served as mayor of Wiarton, Ontario from 1953 until 1955 when he was elected to the Legislative Assembly of Ontario as the Member of Provincial Parliament (MPP) for Bruce. In 1958, he was a candidate for the leadership of the Ontario Liberal Party, but received only 39 votes and dropped off after the first ballot at the 1958 Ontario Liberal leadership convention.

Whicher was re-elected to the legislature in 1959 and 1963 and served as the Liberals' finance critic. During this period, the Progressive Conservative government of John Robarts was often to the left of the Liberals, and Whicher often criticised it for overspending.

Following his provincial career, Whicher served two terms in the House of Commons of Canada as a Liberal Member of Parliament for Bruce. He won his seat in the 1968 federal election, and was re-elected in the 1972 election. He retired from politics when the 1974 election was called.

Parliament of Canada
Preceded by John Loney	Member of Parliament for Bruce; 1968–1974	Succeeded by Crawford Douglas
