= John Loney =

Canadian politician (1929–2017)

- Official 1994 portrait

Member of Parliament for Edmonton North
- In office 25 October 1993 – 1 June 1997
- Preceded by: Steve Paproski
- Succeeded by: Deborah Grey

Member of Parliament for Bruce
- In office 8 April 1963 – 24 June 1968
- Preceded by: Andrew Ernest Robinson
- Succeeded by: Ross Whicher

Personal details
- Born: Edison John Clayton Loney; 23 February 1929 Wiarton, Ontario, Canada
- Died: 22 January 2017 (aged 87)
- Party: Liberal (1993-1997)
- Other political affiliations: Progressive Conservative (1963-1968)
- Profession: Farmer; Grain Grower; Businessman

Edison John Clayton Loney (23 February 1929 – 22 January 2017) was a member of the House of Commons of Canada in the 1960s and again in the 1990s. His career has been in agriculture and business. From 1960 to 1964, he served as Chair of the Bruce Township School Board in Ontario.

Loney, a Progressive Conservative for most of his political career, first won a seat in Canadian Parliament during the 1963 federal election for the Bruce electoral district in Ontario. He was re-elected there in the 1965 federal election, but defeated in 1968. During this time, Loney served in the 26th and 27th Canadian Parliaments.

Loney made further unsuccessful attempts to regain the Bruce riding in 1972 and 1974. He moved to Alberta and made another failed attempt to return to Parliament in the Edmonton North riding in the 1988 federal election.

After switching to the Liberal party, Loney won Edmonton North in the 1993 federal election. After serving in the 35th Canadian Parliament, he did not seek another term in Parliament and left Canadian politics in 1997.

Parliament of Canada
Preceded by Andrew Ernest Robinson	Member of Parliament Bruce; 1963–1968	Succeeded by Ross Whicher
Preceded by Steve Paproski	Member of Parliament Edmonton North; 1993–1997	Succeeded by Deborah Grey
