= Eastern Canada =

Region of Canada

Coordinates: 47°11′22.96″N 70°8′12.19″W

Eastern Canada Est du Canada (Canadian French)
- Region
- Eastern Canada (green) within the rest of Canada (tan)
- Country: Canada
- Composition: New Brunswick (NB); Newfoundland and Labrador (NL); Nova Scotia (NS); Ontario (ON); Prince Edward Island (PE); Quebec (QC)
- Principal cities: List: Toronto; Montreal; Ottawa; Quebec City; Hamilton; Kitchener; London; St. Catharines; Halifax; Oshawa; Barrie

Area
  - Total: 2,783,400 km^{2} (1,074,700 sq mi)

Population (2021)
  - Total: 29,730,600
  - Density: 10.681/km^{2} (27.665/sq mi)
- Time zones: UTC-05:00 (Eastern)
- UTC-04:00 (Atlantic)
- UTC-03:30 (Newfoundland)

Eastern Canada (Canadian French: Est du Canada, also known as the Eastern provinces, Canadian East or the East) is generally considered to be the region of Canada south of Hudson Bay and Hudson Strait, and east of Manitoba. From east to west, it consists of the provinces of Newfoundland and Labrador, Nova Scotia, Prince Edward Island, New Brunswick, Quebec, and Ontario.

Eastern Canada overlaps into other geographic regions; Ontario and Quebec, Canada's two largest provinces, define Central Canada, while the other provinces in Eastern Canada constitute Atlantic Canada. New Brunswick, Nova Scotia and Prince Edward Island are also known as the Maritime provinces.

== Capitals ==
Ottawa, Canada's capital, is located in Eastern Canada, within the province of Ontario.

The capitals of the provinces are in the list below:

- St. John's, Newfoundland and Labrador
- Halifax, Nova Scotia
- Charlottetown, Prince Edward Island
- Fredericton, New Brunswick
- Quebec City, Quebec
- Toronto, Ontario

== Definitions ==
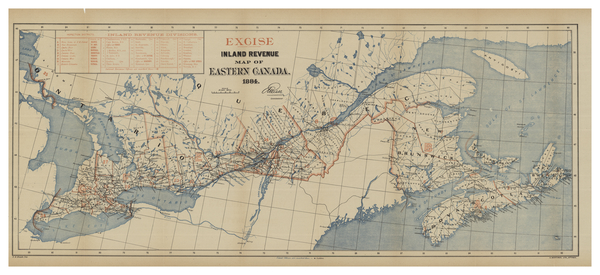
Historical map of Eastern Canada (1884)

The Canadian Press defines Eastern Canada as everything east of and including Thunder Bay, Ontario. This definition excludes from Eastern Canada the sparsely populated section of Northwest Ontario that is west of Thunder Bay, that section including Rainy River District and the most populated part of Kenora District.

== Population ==
The total population of this region is about 25,135,649 in 2021, or about 70% of Canada's population. Most of the population resides in Ontario and Quebec. The region contains three of Canada's five largest metropolitan areas, Toronto being the fourth largest municipality in North America.

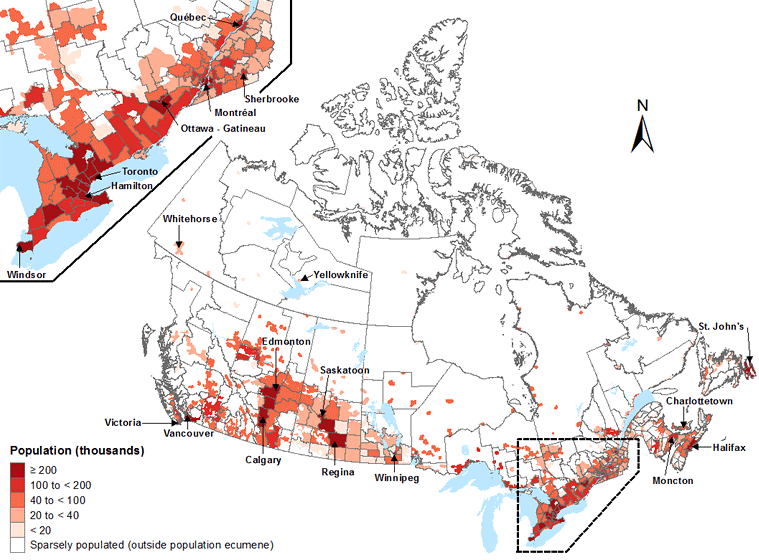
Canada population density map (2014) Top left: The Quebec City–Windsor Corridor is the most densely inhabited and heavily industrialized region accounting for nearly 50 percent of the total population

Largest metropolitan areas

- Toronto, Ontario: 6,254,191
- Montreal, Quebec: 4,098,927
- National Capital Region (Ottawa, Ontario / Gatineau, Quebec): 1,568,381
- Quebec City, Quebec: 807,200
- Hamilton, Ontario: 536,917
- London, Ontario: 474,786
- St. Catharines–Niagara, Ontario: 447,888
- Kitchener, Ontario: 441,380
- Halifax, Nova Scotia: 403,131
- Windsor, Ontario: 329,144
- Barrie, Ontario: 212,667
- Sherbrooke, Quebec: 212,105
- St. John's, Newfoundland and Labrador: 205,955

The population of each province in 2021, from greatest to least is here:

- Ontario: 14,223,942
- Quebec: 8,501,833
- Nova Scotia: 969,383
- New Brunswick: 775,610
- Newfoundland and Labrador: 510,550
- Prince Edward Island: 154,331

== Politics ==
In Canadian politics, Eastern Canada generally supports the Liberal Party. A notable exception is Central Ontario, which remains heavily conservative.

Eastern Canada is represented by 232 Members of Parliament out of the 338 (122 in Ontario, 78 in Quebec, and 32 in the Atlantic Provinces) and 78 senators out of 105.

2025 Federal Election Results for Eastern Canada
Party name		ON	QC	NB	NS	PE	NL	Total
Liberal	Seats:	70	44	6	10	4	4	138
Liberal	Vote:	49.0	42.6	53.4	57.2	57.5	54.0	–
Conservative	Seats:	52	11	4	1	–	3	71
Conservative	Vote:	43.8	23.3	40.8	35.2	36.9	39.7	–
Bloc Québécois	Seats:	–	22	–	–	–	–	22
Bloc Québécois	Vote:	–	27.7	–	–	–	–	–
New Democratic Party	Seats:	–	1	–	–	–	–	1
New Democratic Party	Vote:	4.9	4.5	2.9	5.2	2.5	5.5	–
Green	Seats:	–	–	–	–	–	–	–
Green	Vote:	1.2	0.9	1.7	0.9	2.2	0.1	–
Total seats		122	78	10	11	4	7	232

2025 Federal Election Seat Results for Eastern Canada
138	71	22	1
Liberal	Conservative	Bloc	N

2021 Federal Election Seat Results for Eastern Canada
137	55	32	6	1
Liberal	Conservative	Bloc Québécois	N	G

2019 Federal Election Seat Results for Eastern Canada
140	50	32	8	1
Liberal	Conservative	Bloc Québécois	ND	G

2015 Federal Election Seat Results for Eastern Canada
152	45	24	10
Liberal	Conservative	NDP	BQ

2011 Federal Election Seat Results for Eastern Canada
92	87	30	4
Conservative	New Democratic	Liberal	B

2008 Federal Election Seat Results for Eastern Canada
71	69	49	22	2
Conservative	Liberal	Bloc Québécois	NDP	I

2006 Federal Election Seat Results for Eastern Canada
87	59	51	15	1
Liberal	Conservative	Bloc Québécois	NDP	I

2004 Federal Election Seat Results for Eastern Canada
118	54	31	10
Liberal	Bloc Québécois	Conservative	NDP

2000 Federal Election Seat Results for Eastern Canada
155	38	10	5	2
Liberal	Bloc Québécois	PC	N	C

1997 Federal Election Seat Results for Eastern Canada
138	44	19	8	1
Liberal	Bloc Québécois	PC	ND	I

1993 Federal Election Seat Results for Eastern Canada
148	54	2	1	1
Liberal	Bloc Québécois	P	R	I

1988 Federal Election Seat Results for Eastern Canada
121	75	10
Progressive Conservative	Liberal	NDP

1984 Federal Election Seat Results for Eastern Canada
150	38	13	1
Progressive Conservative	Liberal	NDP	I

1980 Federal Election Seat Results for Eastern Canada
145	52	5
Liberal	Progressive Conservative	N

== See also ==
- Western Canada
- Eastern United States
- List of regions of Canada
