= Edmonton North =

Former federal electoral district in Alberta, Canada

Alberta electoral district

Defunct federal electoral district
- Legislature: House of Commons
- District created: 1976
- District abolished: 2004
- First contested: 1979
- Last contested: 2000

Edmonton North was a federal electoral district in Alberta, Canada, that was represented in the House of Commons of Canada from 1979 to 2004.

== Demographics ==
Population, 2001	103,893
Electors	83,259
Area (km^{2})	
Population density (people per km^{2})	

== Geography ==
The riding consisted of the northern part of the city of Edmonton, Alberta.

1976 representation order

1987 representation order

1996 representation order

== History ==
It was created in 1976 from parts of Edmonton Centre, Edmonton East, Edmonton West, and Pembina ridings.

It was abolished in 2003 when it was redistributed into Edmonton East, Edmonton—Sherwood Park and Edmonton—St. Albert ridings.

=== Members of Parliament ===
This riding elected the following members of Parliament:

Edmonton North
Parliament	Years	Member	Party
Riding created from Edmonton Centre, Edmonton East, Edmonton West, and Pembina
31st	1979–1980	Steve Paproski	Progressive Conservative
32nd	1980–1984	Steve Paproski	Progressive Conservative
33rd	1984–1988	Steve Paproski	Progressive Conservative
34th	1988–1993	Steve Paproski	Progressive Conservative
35th	1993–1997	John Loney	Liberal
36th	1997–2000	Deborah Grey	Reform
36th	2000–2000	Deborah Grey	Alliance
37th	2000–2002	Deborah Grey	Alliance
37th	2002–2002	Deborah Grey	Democratic Representative
37th	2002–2003	Deborah Grey	Alliance
37th	2003–2004	Deborah Grey	Conservative
Riding dissolved into Edmonton East, Edmonton—Sherwood Park, and Edmonton—St. Albert

== Election results ==
2000 Canadian federal election
Party	Candidate	Votes	%	±%	Expenditures
Alliance	Deborah Grey	22,063	51.22	+6.92	$61,317
Liberal	Jim Jacuta	14,786	34.33	+1.85	$28,846
New Democratic	Laurie Lang	3,216	7.47	–7.40	$815
Progressive Conservative	Dean Sanduga	3,010	6.99	–0.73	$9,842
Total valid votes		43,075	99.60		
Total rejected ballots		174	0.40	+0.13	
Turnout		43,249	57.20	+1.57	
Eligible voters		75,604			
Alliance hold		Swing		+4.39	
Source: Elections Canada

1997 Canadian federal election
Party	Candidate	Votes	%	±%	Expenditures
Reform	Deborah Grey	16,124	44.30	+5.24	$56,921
Liberal	Jonathan Murphy	11,820	32.48	–6.99	$46,517
New Democratic	Ray Martin	5,413	14.87	+7.95	$60,286
Progressive Conservative	Mitch Panciuk	2,811	7.72	–1.56	$51,169
Natural Law	Ric Johnsen	226	0.62	+0.10	none listed
Total valid votes		36,394	99.73		
Total rejected ballots		99	0.27	+0.07	
Turnout		36,493	55.63	–7.15	
Eligible voters		65,595			
Reform gain from Liberal		Swing		+6.12	
Source: Elections Canada

1993 Canadian federal election
Party	Candidate	Votes	%	±%
Liberal	John Loney	19,536	39.47	+19.98
Reform	Ron Mix	19,334	39.06	+33.53
Progressive Conservative	Mitch Panciuk	4,592	9.28	–30.75
New Democratic	Lori Hall	3,427	6.92	–25.84
National	Ed Agoto	2,174	4.39	–
Natural Law	Ria Kinzel	256	0.52	–
Canada Party	Tim Formoe	103	0.21	–
Independent	Robert Vallée	77	0.16	–
Total valid votes		49,499	99.80	
Total rejected ballots		97	0.20	–0.19
Turnout		49,596	62.78	–7.99
Eligible voters		79,002		
Liberal gain from Progressive Conservative		Swing		+26.76
Source: Elections Canada

1988 Canadian federal election
Party	Candidate	Votes	%	±%
Progressive Conservative	Steve Paproski	19,045	40.03	–17.26
New Democratic	Nels Rissling	15,583	32.76	+8.51
Liberal	John Loney	9,270	19.49	+3.11
Reform	A. Erich Bier	2,630	5.53	–
Christian Heritage	John Werkman	723	1.52	–
Independent	Alan Clark	139	0.29	–
Commonwealth of Canada	Bill Bohdan	64	0.13	–
Communist	Robin Leslie Boodle	62	0.13	–0.25
Confederation of Regions	Sigmund Kehlert	58	0.12	–0.90
Total valid votes		47,574	99.61	
Total rejected ballots		184	0.39	+0.17
Turnout		47,758	70.77	+9.07
Eligible voters		67,483		
Progressive Conservative hold		Swing		–12.89
Source: Elections Canada

1984 Canadian federal election
Party	Candidate	Votes	%	±%
Progressive Conservative	Steve Paproski	29,074	57.29	–1.69
New Democratic	Garth Stevenson	12,305	24.25	+10.20
Liberal	Dave Stewart	8,311	16.38	–10.29
Confederation of Regions	Dave Draginda	520	1.02	–
Social Credit	Frank Cerminara	345	0.68	–
Communist	Naomi Rankin	194	0.38	–
Total valid votes		50,749	99.78	
Total rejected ballots		112	0.22	–0.04
Turnout		50,861	61.70	+8.78
Eligible voters		82,435		
Progressive Conservative hold		Swing		–5.95
Source: Elections Canada

1980 Canadian federal election
Party	Candidate	Votes	%	±%
Progressive Conservative	Steve Paproski	21,442	58.98	–1.55
Liberal	Arthur Yates	9,696	26.67	+1.45
New Democratic	John Younie	5,107	14.05	+0.10
Marxist–Leninist	Daniel R. Nelson	112	0.31	+0.01
Total valid votes		36,357	99.74	
Total rejected ballots		95	0.26	+0.04
Turnout		36,452	52.92	–8.67
Eligible voters		68,885		
Progressive Conservative hold		Swing		–1.50
Source: Elections Canada

1979 Canadian federal election
Party	Candidate	Votes	%	±%
Progressive Conservative	Steve Paproski	24,618	60.53	–
Liberal	Joe Yanick	10,259	25.22	–
New Democratic	John Miller	5,673	13.95	–
Marxist–Leninist	Daniel R. Nelson	122	0.30	–
Total valid votes		40,672	99.78	
Total rejected ballots		90	0.22	–
Turnout		40,762	61.59	–
Eligible voters		66,187		
Progressive Conservative hold		Swing		N/A
Source: Elections Canada

== See also ==
- List of Canadian electoral districts
- Historical federal electoral districts of Canada
