= Larry Miller (Canadian politician) =

Canadian politician

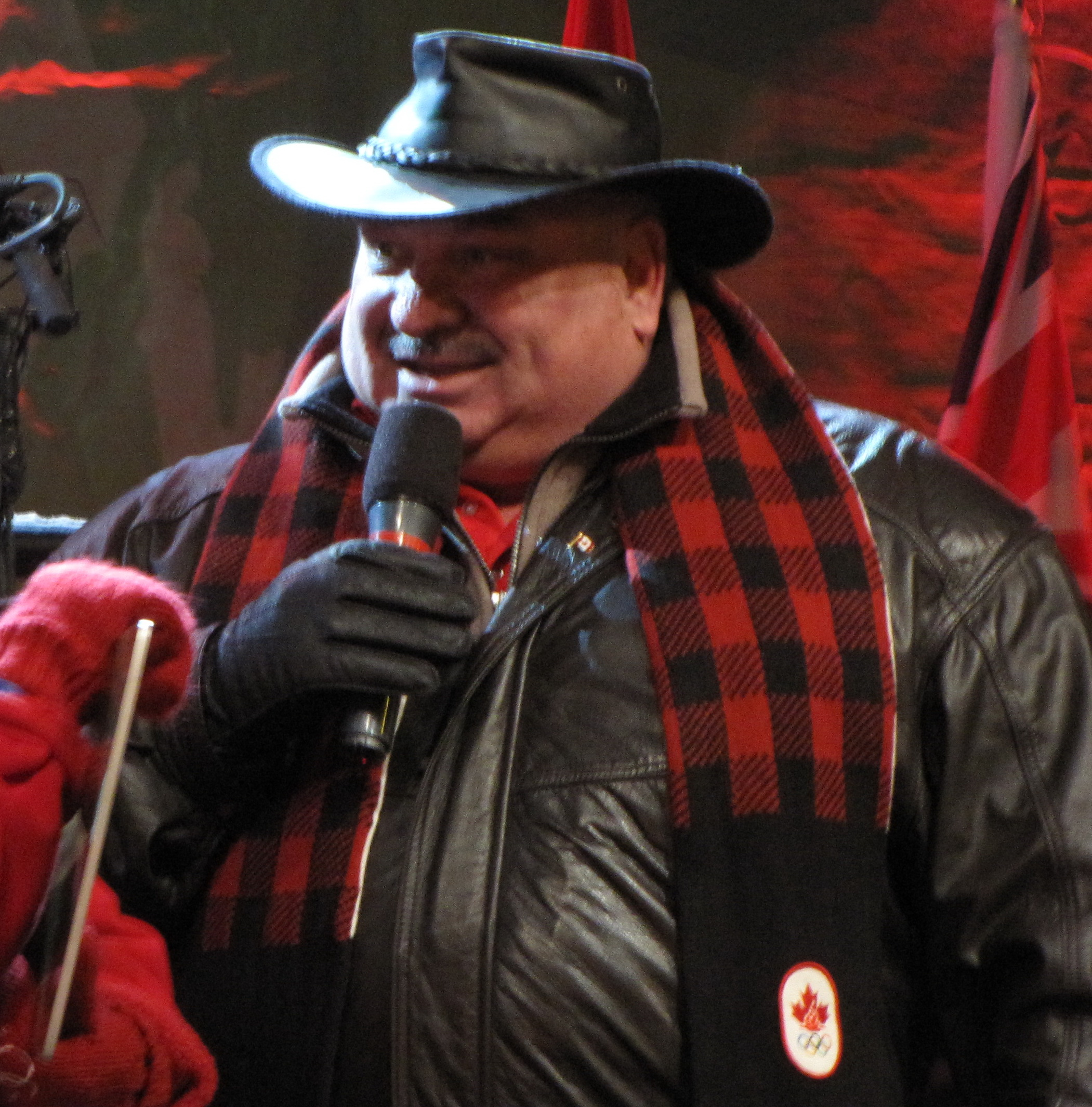
- Miller at the Olympic Torch ceremony in Owen Sound

Member of Parliament for Bruce—Grey—Owen Sound
- In office June 28, 2004 – September 11, 2019
- Preceded by: Ovid Jackson
- Succeeded by: Alex Ruff

Chair of the Standing Committee on Agriculture
- In office 3 February 2009 – 24 September 2012
- Minister: Gerry Ritz
- Preceded by: James Bezan
- Succeeded by: Merv Tweed

Personal details
- Born: 21 July 1956 (age 69) Wiarton, Ontario, Canada
- Party: Conservative
- Spouse: Darlene Miller
- Profession: Beef farmer

Larry Miller (born 21 July 1956) is a Canadian politician who served as the Member of Parliament (MP) for the riding of Bruce—Grey—Owen Sound from 2004 to 2019 as a member of the Conservative Party.

== Early life and career ==
Miller was born in Wiarton, Ontario on 21 July 1956. Before entering federal politics, he was a councillor in Keppel Township, Ontario from 1991 to 1993. He progressed to Deputy Reeve in 1994, and in 1996 became the Reeve of Keppel Township. He was briefly a councillor in Grey County between 2000 and 2001, and between 2000 and 2004 he was mayor of Georgian Bluffs. He also owns a beef-farming operation.

== Federal politics ==
Miller won the Conservative Party nomination for Bruce—Grey—Owen Sound in 2004, and defeated three-term Liberal MP Ovid Jackson by almost 5,000 votes in that year's federal election.

With many historic Georgian Bay lighthouses in his riding, Miller sponsored the bill that became the Heritage Lighthouse Protection Act in the Commons in January 2008.

In the 2015 election, he was reelected by almost 5,000 votes.

Miller did not seek re-election in the 2019 federal election and retired from politics.

=== Bill C-19 controversy ===
On 7 February 2012, during a Parliamentary Debate about Bill C-19, Miller stirred controversy after comparing the long-gun registry to Adolf Hitler and the Nazi Regime quoting former Liberal Minister Allan Rock: "I came to Ottawa last year with the firm belief that the only people in Canada who should have firearms are police officers and the military." Miller added afterwards: "Sound familiar? Adolf Hitler. 1939". Later, he quoted former Liberal Senator Sharon Carstairs, who had said "the registering of hunting rifles is the first step in the social re-engineering of Canadians," to which Miller added "that is what Adolf Hitler tried to do in the 1930s". Miller later retracted his statements.

=== Citizenship ceremony controversy ===
On 16 March 2015, while appearing on a call-in show on CFOS Radio, Miller commented on the issue of Zunera Ishaq wishing to wear a niqab at her citizenship ceremony. Miller said, "if you don't like that or don't want to do that, stay the hell where you came from, is the way, and I think most Canadians feel the same... I'm so sick and tired of, of people wanting to come here because they know it's a good country and then they want to change things before they even really officially become a Canadian, so, I have no sympathy for her..." The following day, Miller issued a statement apologizing for part of his comments, but maintained his opinion that one should uncover their face when taking the citizenship oath.

== Personal life ==
Miller is married with three children and three grandchildren.

== Electoral record ==
2015 Canadian federal election: Bruce—Grey—Owen Sound
| Party | Candidate | Votes | % | ±% | Expenditures |
|---|---|---|---|---|---|
| Conservative | Larry Miller | 26,297 | 46.68 | -9.62 | $121,344.93 |
| Liberal | Kimberley Love | 21,879 | 38.84 | +22.77 | $77,135.87 |
| New Democratic | David McLaren | 6,270 | 11.13 | -6.51 | $28,809.26 |
| Green | Chris Albinati | 1,887 | 3.35 | -6.64 | $4,346.25 |
| Total valid votes/expense limit | | 56,333 | 100.00 | | $218,310.52 |
| Total rejected ballots | | 212 | 0.37 | | |
| Turnout | | 56,545 | 68.91 | | |
| Eligible voters | | 82,056 | | | |
| Conservative hold | | Swing | | -16.20 | |
Source: Elections Canada

2011 Canadian federal election
| Party | Candidate | Votes | % | ±% | Expenditures |
|---|---|---|---|---|---|
| Conservative | Larry Miller | 28,744 | 56.30 | +8.64 | – |
| New Democratic | Karen Gventer | 9,008 | 17.64 | +8.01 | – |
| Liberal | Kimberley Love | 8,203 | 16.07 | +1.77 | – |
| Green | Emma Jane Hogbin | 5,099 | 9.99 | -17.18 | – |
| Total valid votes | | 51,054 | 100.00 | – | |
| Total rejected ballots | | 227 | 0.44 | +0.02 | |
| Turnout | | 51,281 | 65.04 | +3.68 | |
| Eligible voters | | 78,848 | – | – | |

2008 Canadian federal election
| Party | Candidate | Votes | % | ±% | Expenditures |
|---|---|---|---|---|---|
| Conservative | Larry Miller | 22,975 | 47.66 | -0.52 | $83,330 |
| Green | Dick Hibma | 13,095 | 27.17 | +14.26 | $63,875 |
| Liberal | Thomas Noble | 6,892 | 14.30 | -13.26 | $39,399 |
| New Democratic | Jill McIllwraith | 4,640 | 9.63 | -1.71 | $9,434 |
| Christian Heritage | Joel Kidd | 599 | 1.24 | * | $1,377 |
| Total valid votes/expense limit | | 48,201 | 100.00 | $84,478 | |
| Total rejected ballots | | 204 | 0.42 | | |
| Turnout | | 48,405 | 61.36 | – | |

2006 Canadian federal election
| Party | Candidate | Votes | % | ±% | Expenditures |
|---|---|---|---|---|---|
| Conservative | Larry Miller | 25,133 | 48.18 | +3.2 | $72,117 |
| Liberal | Verona Jackson | 14,378 | 27.56 | -8.2 | $52,377 |
| Green | Shane Jolley | 6,735 | 12.91 | +8.7 | $17,349 |
| New Democratic | Jill McIllwraith | 5,918 | 11.34 | -1.7 | $11,210 |
| Total valid votes/expense limit | | 52,164 | 100.00 | | |

2004 Canadian federal election
| Party | Candidate | Votes | % | ±% |
|---|---|---|---|---|
| Conservative | Larry Miller | 22,411 | 45.0 | -6.0 |
| Liberal | Ovid Jackson | 17,824 | 35.8 | -8.4 |
| New Democratic | Sebastian Ostertag | 6,516 | 13.1 | +8.2 |
| Green | Alex Drossos | 2,076 | 4.2 | |
| Christian Heritage | Steven J. Taylor | 982 | 2.0 | |
| Total valid votes | | 49,809 | 100.0 | |

Note: Conservative vote is compared to the total of the Canadian Alliance vote and Progressive Conservative vote in 2000 election.
