= John O'Reilly (politician) =

Canadian politician

John O'Reilly MP

Member of Parliament for Haliburton—Victoria—Brock Victoria—Haliburton (1993–2000)
- In office October 25, 1993 – June 28, 2004
- Preceded by: William C. Scott
- Succeeded by: Barry Devolin

Personal details
- Born: John Francary O'Reilly; August 4, 1940 (age 85) Lindsay, Ontario, Canada
- Party: Liberal

John Francary O'Reilly (born August 4, 1940) is a Canadian politician. He represented the riding of Haliburton—Kawartha Lakes—Brock from 1993 to 2004. O'Reilly represented the riding as a Liberal. Prior to serving as a Member of Parliament, he served as a councillor in Lindsay, Ontario. During his tenure, O'Reilly was re-elected twice, and served as the Parliamentary Secretary to the Minister of Defence from 2000 to 2003 under the Chrétien government. He unsuccessfully ran for re-election in 2004, and was succeeded by 1993 Reform Party candidate for the riding, Barry Devolin. Following his defeat, he returned to his career as a real estate broker.
