= Crawford Douglas =

Canadian politician

Member of Parliament for Bruce
- In office July 1974 – March 1979

Personal details
- Born: 10 February 1931 Guelph, Ontario, Canada
- Died: 15 December 1995 (aged 64) Nepean, Ontario, Canada
- Party: Liberal
- Spouse: Lorna May Nelson (m. 1959)
- Children: 3
- Profession: broadcaster

Crawford Douglas (10 February 1931 – 15 December 1995) was a Liberal party member of the House of Commons of Canada. He was a broadcaster by career, particularly for CKNX-TV in Wingham, Ontario.

He was elected at the Bruce riding in the 1974 general election and served in the 30th Parliament. In 1976 and 1977, he served as Deputy Whip for the governing Liberals and chaired the Standing Committee on Broadcasting, Films and Assistance to the Arts. Crawford was defeated in the 1979 federal election by Gary Gurbin of the Progressive Conservative party, as the riding was renamed to Bruce—Grey. He died on 15 December 1995, aged 64.
