= Donald Buchanan Blue =

Canadian politician (1901–1974)

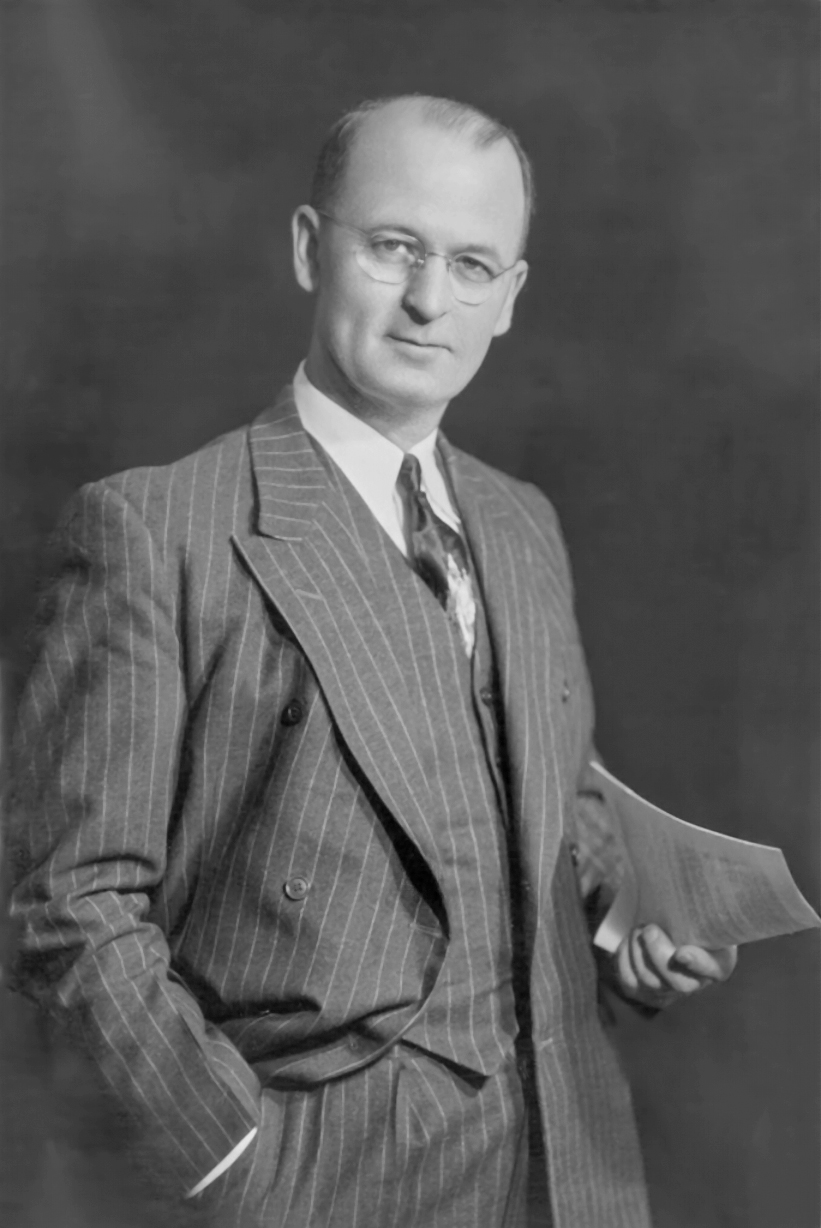

Member of the Canadian Parliament for Bruce
- In office June 27, 1949 – August 9, 1953
- Preceded by: Andrew Ernest Robinson
- Succeeded by: Andrew Ernest Robinson

Personal details
- Born: May 6, 1901 Huron Township, Ontario, Canada
- Died: December 4, 1974 (aged 73)
- Party: Liberal
- Occupation: auctioneer farmer merchant

Donald Buchanan Blue (May 6, 1901 – December 4, 1974) was a Canadian politician, auctioneer, farmer and merchant. He was born in Huron Township, Ontario, Canada. He was elected to the House of Commons of Canada in the 1949 election as a Member of the Liberal Party to represent the riding of Bruce. He was defeated in the elections of 1953 and 1957.
