= Jamie Schmale =

Canadian politician

Jamie Schmale MP
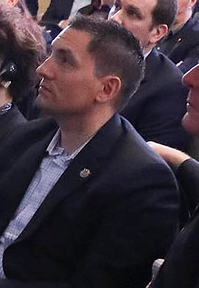

Member of Parliament for Haliburton—Kawartha Lakes Haliburton—Kawartha Lakes—Brock (2015–2025)
- Incumbent
- Assumed office October 19, 2015
- Preceded by: Barry Devolin

Personal details
- Party: Conservative

Jamie P. Schmale MP is a Canadian politician, who was elected to represent the riding of Haliburton—Kawartha Lakes—Brock in the House of Commons of Canada in the 2015 federal election. He was re-elected in the 2019 election.

Prior to entering politics, Schmale attended Loyalist College, graduating from the Radio Broadcasting program. Schmale started his career as News Anchor and later News Director for CHUM media. He also covered news, municipal politics, and sports for 91.9 FM Radio CKLY in Lindsay, Ontario. He hosts the conservative party podcast The Blueprint where he has many conservative politicians on as guests to discuss policy and current events.

Prior to entering the House of Commons, Schmale served as former MP Barry Devolin’s Executive Assistant for 11 years (2004–11), and as his Campaign Manager in 2004, 2006, 2008 and 2011. Schmale is the current conservative critic or shadow minister for Crown-Indigenous Relations. He was elected vice chair of the Canadian House of Commons Standing Committee on Indigenous and Northern Affairs in the 45th Canadian Parliament in 2025.

== Electoral record ==
2021 Canadian federal election: Haliburton—Kawartha Lakes—Brock
Party	Candidate	Votes	%	±%	Expenditures
Conservative	Jamie Schmale	35,418	52.30	+3.24	$56,137.89
Liberal	Judi Forbes	15,645	23.10	-2.85	$37,302.49
New Democratic	Zac Miller	9,730	14.37	-0.35	$1,001.63
People's	Alison Davidson	4,769	7.04	+5.15	$8,830.55
Green	Angel Godsoe	1,696	2.50	-5.89	$3,273.95
Libertarian	Gene Balfour	463	0.68	–	$296.50
Total valid votes		67,721			
Total rejected ballots		493			
Turnout		68,214	66.52	-0.14	
Eligible voters		102,554			
Source: Elections Canada
Conservative hold		Swing		+3.05	

2019 Canadian federal election: Haliburton—Kawartha Lakes—Brock
Party	Candidate	Votes	%	±%	Expenditures
Conservative	Jamie Schmale	32,257	49.05	+4.22	$50,030.95
Liberal	Judi Forbes	17,067	25.95	-5.80	$41,518.07
New Democratic	Barbara Doyle	9,676	14.71	-4.72	$7,114.67
Green	Elizabeth Fraser	5,515	8.39	+4.40	none listed
People's	Gene Balfour	1,245	1.89	–	none listed
Total valid votes/expense limit		65,760	99.38		
Total rejected ballots		413	0.62		
Turnout		66,173	66.66		
Eligible voters		99,274			
Conservative hold		Swing		+5.01	
Source: Elections Canada

2015 Canadian federal election: Haliburton—Kawartha Lakes—Brock
Party	Candidate	Votes	%	±%	Expenditures
Conservative	Jamie Schmale	27,718	44.83	-15.21	$69,530.77
Liberal	David Marquis	19,634	31.75	+18.90	$45,773.96
New Democratic	Mike Perry	12,012	19.43	-2.64	$53,554.91
Green	Bill MacCallum	2,470	3.99	-1.05	$8,268.38
Total valid votes/Expense limit		61,834	100.00		$232,886.36
Total rejected ballots		203	0.33	–	
Turnout		62,037	68.02	–	
Eligible voters		91,208			
Conservative hold		Swing		-17.06	
Source: Elections Canada
