= Beaches—East York =

Beaches—East York may refer to:

- Beaches—East York (federal electoral district), federal riding in Toronto, Ontario, Canada
- Beaches—East York (provincial electoral district), provincial riding in Toronto, Ontario, Canada
- Ward 19 Beaches—East York, municipal ward in Toronto, Ontario, Canada
