= Emma Jane Hogbin =

Canadian free software advocate

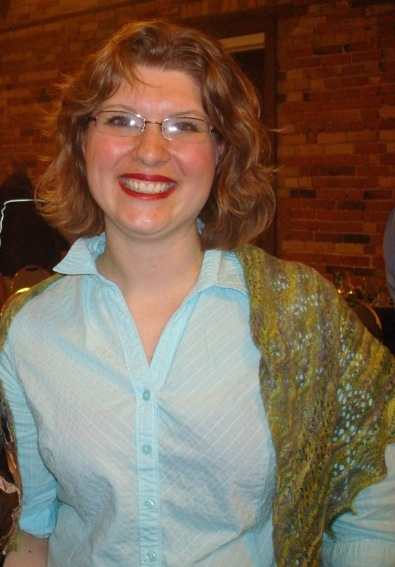
- Born: Emma Jane Hogbin; May 2, 1977 (age 49)
- Occupations: Technical writer, Consultant, Free software advocate.
- Political party: Green Party of Canada
- Spouse: James Westby (2012 -)
- Website: emmajane.net

Emma Jane Hogbin (born May 2, 1977) is a Canadian technical writer and free software advocate who lives in Dartmoor, United Kingdom. As of 2009, she was active in Drupal and the Bazaar version control system in different capacities and has contributed documentation to the Linux Documentation Project. In 2010 She also spoke at various events on a range of technical and social topics. She is a member of Ubuntu Women, a group devoted in part to "Encouraging women to participate, for example, to learn to create new FLOSS software (or revamp existing software), not only to use Linux software, but to integrate backwards and learn more about it." Hogbin unsuccessfully ran for the Green Party of Canada in the Ontario riding of Bruce-Grey-Owen Sound during the 2011 federal election.

== Unicorn Law ==
Hogbin formulated the "Unicorn Law", named by herself and Gabrielle Roth in 2009. The law states:

If you are a woman in open source, you will eventually give a talk about being a woman in open source.

In late 2010, the Unicorn Law was controversially referenced on T-shirts for the Haecksen conference, a mini-conf preceding Australia's linux.conf.au 2011.

== Politics ==
Hogbin has been interested in politics from an early age. In 1991, she served as a Legislative Page to the 35th Legislative Assembly of Ontario. In 1998 she served as a Legislative Usher to the 36th Legislative Assembly of Ontario. She continues to be politically active through her Web development consultancy and has built the campaign Web sites for Shane Jolley and Dick Hibma. On March 25, 2010, she announced that she had filed to run for the Green Party nomination to be a candidate for the riding of Bruce-Grey-Owen Sound in the 2011 federal election. On May 2, she was defeated, having received 5,092 votes.

== Technology ==
Hogbin is active in the world of technology, specifically in free software and operates a freelance consulting business.

=== Free software ===
Hogbin is an accomplished contributor to free software projects in terms of documentation of software, Web development (such as for the Bazaar version control system Web site) and talks. She has written articles for Full Circle Magazine on women in the Ubuntu community, and is a co-author of the book Front End Drupal.

=== Career ===
Hogbin runs HICK Tech, a service business providing education and Web development services. Included in the work she has done is Web design development for the Language Evaluation and Assessment Project and Collaborative Environment for Language Learning projects at the University of Toronto, and work for Canadian Department of Foreign and National Affairs. HICK Tech has done two technology conferences for rural Canada, HICKTech 2007 and HICKTech 2008.

== Personal life ==
Hogbin enjoys crafting activities. She has been featured for her work as an amateur bookbinder and knitting.

Hogbin is known for being the first person on record to apply the GNU General Public License to a knitting pattern.
