= Ovid Jackson =

Canadian politician

Ovid L. Jackson

Member of the Canadian Parliament for Bruce—Grey—Owen Sound
- In office October 25, 1993 – June 28, 2004
- Preceded by: Gus Mitges
- Succeeded by: Larry Miller

Personal details
- Born: February 3, 1939 (age 87) New Amsterdam, Berbice, Guyana
- Party: Liberal
- Committees: Chair, Standing Committee on Transport and Government Operations (2001-2002); Chair, Standing Committee on Transport
- Portfolio: Parliamentary Secretary to the President of the Treasury Board (1996-1998)

Ovid L. Jackson, OOnt (born February 3, 1939, in New Amsterdam, Berbice, Guyana) is a Canadian politician. He represented the federal riding of Bruce—Grey and Bruce—Grey—Owen Sound in the House of Commons for the Liberal Party from 1994 to 2004.

Jackson, originally from Guyana, was a school teacher at West Hill Secondary School in Owen Sound. He was then elected mayor of the city, serving for 10 years before being elected to parliament in the 1993 election. He lost his seat to Conservative candidate Larry Miller in the 2004 election.

== Honours and recognition ==
In 2010, Jackson was named to the Order of Ontario, the province’s highest official honour, for his contributions to politics and community leadership.

In 2024, he received a Lifetime Achievement Award from the Ontario Black History Society during its 36th annual Black History Month Kick-Off Brunch in Toronto.
