= Bruce—Grey—Owen Sound (federal electoral district) =

Federal electoral district in Ontario, Canada

Coordinates: 44.45°N 80.97°W

Ontario electoral district
- Interactive map of riding boundaries from the 2004 federal election

Federal electoral district
- Legislature: House of Commons
MP
Alex Ruff
Conservative
- District created: 1933
- First contested: 1935
- Last contested: 2025
- District webpage: profile, map

Demographics
- Population (2011): 106,475
- Electors (2015): 81,389
- Area (km²): 6,447
- Pop. density (per km²): 16.5
- Census division(s): Bruce County, Grey County
- Census subdivision(s): Owen Sound, West Grey, Meaford, Georgian Bluffs, Grey Highlands, South Bruce Peninsula, Southgate, Hanover, Chatsworth, Arran–Elderslie

Bruce—Grey—Owen Sound (formerly known as Bruce, Bruce—Grey and Grey—Bruce—Owen Sound) is a federal electoral district that has been represented in the House of Commons of Canada since 1935.

The riding once had a reputation of being a swing riding, but it has become more conservative in the last 20 years. It produced many close results over its early years.

== History ==
The district was created in 1933 from Bruce North and Bruce South and was known as "Bruce" riding. Its name was changed in 1975 to "Bruce—Grey", to "Bruce—Grey—Owen Sound" in 2000, to "Grey—Bruce—Owen Sound" in 2003, and to Bruce—Grey—Owen Sound in 2004.

This riding was left unchanged after the 2012 electoral redistribution and 2022 electoral redistribution.

=== Members of Parliament ===
This riding has elected the following members of Parliament:

Parliament	Years	Member	Party
Bruce; Riding created from Bruce North and Bruce South
18th	1935–1940	William Rae Tomlinson	Liberal
19th	1940–1945	William Rae Tomlinson	Liberal
20th	1945–1949	Andrew Ernest Robinson	Progressive Conservative
21st	1949–1953	Donald Buchanan Blue	Liberal
22nd	1953–1957	Andrew Ernest Robinson	Progressive Conservative
23rd	1957–1958	Andrew Ernest Robinson	Progressive Conservative
24th	1958–1962	Andrew Ernest Robinson	Progressive Conservative
25th	1962–1963	Andrew Ernest Robinson	Progressive Conservative
26th	1963–1965	John Loney	Progressive Conservative
27th	1965–1968	John Loney	Progressive Conservative
28th	1968–1972	Ross Whicher	Liberal
29th	1972–1974	Ross Whicher	Liberal
30th	1974–1979	Crawford Douglas	Liberal
Bruce—Grey
31st	1979–1980	Gary Gurbin	Progressive Conservative
32nd	1980–1984	Gary Gurbin	Progressive Conservative
33rd	1984–1988	Gary Gurbin	Progressive Conservative
34th	1988–1993	Gus Mitges	Progressive Conservative
35th	1993–1997	Ovid Jackson	Liberal
36th	1997–2000	Ovid Jackson	Liberal
37th	2000–2004	Ovid Jackson	Liberal
Grey—Bruce—Owen Sound
38th	2004–2006	Larry Miller	Conservative
Bruce—Grey—Owen Sound
39th	2006–2008	Larry Miller	Conservative
40th	2008–2011	Larry Miller	Conservative
41st	2011–2015	Larry Miller	Conservative
42nd	2015–2019	Larry Miller	Conservative
43rd	2019–2021	Alex Ruff	Conservative
44th	2021–2025	Alex Ruff	Conservative
45th	2025–present	Alex Ruff	Conservative

== Demographics ==
According to the 2021 Canadian census

Languages: 91.5% English, 2.1% German, 1.5% Pennsylvania German, 1.1% French
Religions: 55.9% Christian (12.7% Catholic, 11.2% United Church, 4.7% Anglican, 4.0% Presbyterian, 3.3% Lutheran, 2.9% Anabaptist, 2.3% Baptist, 14.8% Other), 41.9% None
Median income: $38,000 (2020)
Average income: $48,760 (2020)

Racial groups in Bruce—Grey—Owen Sound (2011−2021)
Racial group	2021		2016		2011	
Racial group	Pop.	%	Pop.	%	Pop.	%
White (Note: Statistic includes all persons that did not make up part of a visible minority or an indigenous identity.)	102,695	92.29%	98,635	93.77%	98,745	95.12%
Indigenous	4,280	3.85%	4,450	4.23%	3,580	3.45%
Black	1,285	1.15%	545	0.52%	390	0.38%
South Asian	990	0.89%	365	0.35%	435	0.42%
Latin American	355	0.32%	65	0.06%	85	0.08%
Chinese	340	0.31%	330	0.31%	125	0.12%
Filipino	270	0.24%	155	0.15%	105	0.1%
Arab	245	0.22%	170	0.16%	20	0.02%
Japanese	145	0.13%	60	0.06%	50	0.05%
Southeast Asian	105	0.09%	75	0.07%	15	0.01%
Korean	95	0.09%	145	0.14%	155	0.15%
West Asian	75	0.07%	25	0.02%	0	0%
Other (Note: "Visible minority, n.i.e.")	220	0.2%	110	0.1%	40	0.04%
Multiple races (Note: "Multiple visible minorities" under visible minority section on census.)	180	0.16%	60	0.06%	60	0.06%
Total responses	111,270	98.17%	105,190	97.69%	103,815	97.5%
Total population	113,348	100%	107,679	100%	106,475	100%
Notes: Totals greater than 100% due to multiple origin responses. Demographics based on 2012 Canadian federal electoral redistribution riding boundaries.

== Riding associations ==
Riding associations are the local branches of the national political parties:

Party	Association name	CEO'	HQ city
Conservative	Bruce--Grey--Owen Sound Conservative Association	Adam R. Vaughan	Owen Sound
Green	Bruce--Grey--Owen Sound Green Party of Canada	Dave Meslin	Grey Highlands
Liberal	Bruce--Grey--Owen Sound Federal Liberal Association	Anne Marie Watson	West Grey
New Democratic	Bruce--Grey--Owen Sound Federal NDP Riding Association	Christopher Stephen Neudorf	Owen Sound

== Election results ==
Graph of election results in Bruce—Grey—Owen Sound (minor parties that never got 2% of the vote or didn't run consistently are omitted)

=== Bruce—Grey—Owen Sound ===
2025 Canadian federal election
Party	Candidate	Votes	%	±%
Conservative	Alex Ruff	35,484	53.03	+3.85
Liberal	Anne Marie Watson	26,837	40.11	+14.88
New Democratic	Christopher Neudorf	2,069	3.09	–10.50
Green	Natasha Akiwenzie	1,447	2.16	–0.90
United	Ann Gillies	554	0.83	N/A
People's	Pavel Smolko	520	0.78	–7.26
Total valid votes		66,911	99.48	
Total rejected ballots		349	0.52	-0.15
Turnout		67,260	69.84	+5.75
Eligible voters		96,300		
Conservative hold		Swing		–5.51
Source: Elections Canada

2021 Canadian federal election: Bruce—Grey—Owen Sound
Party	Candidate	Votes	%	±%	Expenditures
Conservative	Alex Ruff	28,727	49.18	+3.1	$73,440.24
Liberal	Anne Marie Watson	14,738	25.23	-4.9	$50,410.51
New Democratic	Christopher Neudorf	7,939	13.59	+1.9	$8,224.88
People's	Anna-Marie Fosbrooke	4,697	8.04	+5.2	$7,061.94
Green	Ashley Michelle Lawrence	1,789	3.06	-5.7	$0.00
Independent	Reima Kaikkonen	524	0.90	–	$9,850.00
Total valid votes		58,414	99.33		
Total rejected ballots		394	0.67		
Turnout		58,808	64.09		
Eligible voters		91,757			
Conservative hold		Swing		+4.0	
Source: Elections Canada

2019 Canadian federal election: Bruce—Grey—Owen Sound
Party	Candidate	Votes	%	±%	Expenditures
Conservative	Alex Ruff	26,830	46.1	-0.58	$80,258.91
Liberal	Michael Den Tandt	17,485	30.1	-8.74	$85,055.44
New Democratic	Chris Stephen	6,797	11.7	+0.57	$6,077.71
Green	Danielle Valiquette	5,114	8.8	+5.45	none listed
People's	Bill Townsend	1,614	2.8	–	$0.00
Libertarian	Daniel Little	321	0.6	–	$0.00
Total valid votes/expense limit		58,161	100.0		
Total rejected ballots		303			
Turnout		58,464	65.6		
Eligible voters		89,114			
Conservative hold		Swing		+8.00	
Source: Elections Canada

2015 Canadian federal election
Party	Candidate	Votes	%	±%	Expenditures
Conservative	Larry Miller	26,297	46.68	-9.62	$121,344.93
Liberal	Kimberley Love	21,879	38.84	+22.77	$77,135.87
New Democratic	David McLaren	6,270	11.13	-6.51	$28,809.26
Green	Chris Albinati	1,887	3.35	-6.64	$4,346.25
Total valid votes/Expense limit		56,333	100.00		$218,310.52
Total rejected ballots		212	0.37		
Turnout		56,545	68.91		
Eligible voters		82,056			
Conservative hold		Swing		-16.20	
Source: Elections Canada

2011 Canadian federal election
Party	Candidate	Votes	%	±%	Expenditures
Conservative	Larry Miller	28,744	56.30	+8.64	–
New Democratic	Karen Gventer	9,008	17.64	+8.01	–
Liberal	Kimberley Love	8,203	16.07	+1.77	–
Green	Emma Jane Hogbin	5,099	9.99	-17.18	–
Total valid votes		51,054	100.00	–	
Total rejected ballots		227	0.44	+0.02	
Turnout		51,281	65.04	+3.68	
Eligible voters		78,848	–	–	

2008 Canadian federal election
Party	Candidate	Votes	%	±%	Expenditures
Conservative	Larry Miller	22,975	47.66	-0.52	$83,330
Green	Dick Hibma	13,095	27.17	+14.26	$63,875
Liberal	Thomas Noble	6,892	14.30	-13.26	$39,399
New Democratic	Jill McIllwraith	4,640	9.63	-1.71	$9,434
Christian Heritage	Joel Kidd	599	1.24	*	$1,377
Total valid votes/Expense limit		48,201	100.00	$84,478	
Total rejected ballots		204	0.42		
Turnout		48,405	61.36	–	

2006 Canadian federal election
Party	Candidate	Votes	%	±%	Expenditures
Conservative	Larry Miller	25,133	48.18	+3.2	$72,117
Liberal	Verona Jackson	14,378	27.56	-8.2	$52,377
Green	Shane Jolley	6,735	12.91	+8.7	$17,349
New Democratic	Jill McIllwraith	5,918	11.34	-1.7	$11,210
Total valid votes/Expense limit		52,164	100.00		

=== Grey—Bruce—Owen Sound ===
2004 Canadian federal election
Party	Candidate	Votes	%	±%
Conservative	Larry Miller	22,411	45.0	-6.0
Liberal	Ovid Jackson	17,824	35.8	-8.4
New Democratic	Sebastian Ostertag	6,516	13.1	+8.2
Green	Alex Drossos	2,076	4.2	
Christian Heritage	Steven J. Taylor	982	2.0	
Total valid votes		49,809	100.0	

Note: Conservative vote is compared to the total of the Canadian Alliance vote and Progressive Conservative vote in 2000 election.

=== Bruce—Grey ===
2000 Canadian federal election
Party	Candidate	Votes	%	±%
Liberal	Ovid Jackson	19,822	44.2	+7.4
Alliance	Murray Peer	15,960	35.6	+2.4
Progressive Conservative	Allen Wilford	6,872	15.3	-7.6
New Democratic	Karen Gventer	2,166	4.8	-2.3
Total valid votes		44,820	100.0	

Note: Canadian Alliance vote is compared to the Reform vote in 1997 election.

1997 Canadian federal election
Party	Candidate	Votes	%	±%
Liberal	Ovid Jackson	17,896	36.8	-12.3
Reform	Murray Peer	16,161	33.2	+8.5
Progressive Conservative	John Middlebro	11,139	22.9	+4.1
New Democratic	Colleen Anne Purdon	3,446	7.1	+2.8
Total valid votes		48,642	100.0	

1993 Canadian federal election
Party	Candidate	Votes	%	±%
Liberal	Ovid Jackson	25,693	49.1	+10.2
Reform	Alan Aston	12,939	24.7	
Progressive Conservative	Stew O'Keefe	9,836	18.8	-22.1
New Democratic	Cathy Hird	2,259	4.3	-14.7
National	Stuart Marwick	1,001	1.9	
Green	Jim Garrity	320	0.6	0.0
Natural Law	John Wolter	158	0.3	
Libertarian	Ralph Hanke	152	0.3	
Total valid votes		52,358	100.0	

1988 Canadian federal election
Party	Candidate	Votes	%	±%
Progressive Conservative	Gus Mitges	19,748	40.9	-23.9
Liberal	Douglas M. Thompson	18,796	38.9	+15.6
New Democratic	Cathy Hird	9,183	19.0	+7.0
Green	Don Cianci	317	0.7	
Commonwealth of Canada	George Bothwell	267	0.6	
Total valid votes		48,311	100.0	

1984 Canadian federal election
Party	Candidate	Votes	%	±%
Progressive Conservative	Gary M. Gurbin	27,611	64.7	+17.4
Liberal	Ron Oswald	9,931	23.3	-17.3
New Democratic	Norma Peterson	5,112	12.0	+0.7
Total valid votes		42,654	100.0	

1980 Canadian federal election
Party	Candidate	Votes	%	±%
Progressive Conservative	Gary M. Gurbin	18,326	47.3	-5.1
Liberal	Rodger D. Schwass	15,735	40.6	+5.2
New Democratic	Malcolm A. Kennett	4,391	11.3	-0.3
Libertarian	Jim Turner	299	0.8	+0.2
Total valid votes		38,751	100.0	

1979 Canadian federal election
Party	Candidate	Votes	%	±%
Progressive Conservative	Gary M. Gurbin	21,219	52.4	+9.9
Liberal	Crawford Douglas	14,314	35.4	-12.2
New Democratic	John Giese	4,723	11.7	+1.7
Libertarian	Norman Helen Watson	223	0.6	
Total valid votes		40,479	100.0	

=== Bruce ===
1974 Canadian federal election
Party	Candidate	Votes	%	±%
Liberal	Crawford Douglas	17,158	47.5	+2.2
Progressive Conservative	John Loney	15,346	42.5	-0.7
New Democratic	Gene Kiviaho	3,586	9.9	-1.5
Total valid votes		36,090	100.0	

1972 Canadian federal election
Party	Candidate	Votes	%	±%
Liberal	Ross Whicher	14,974	45.3	-1.4
Progressive Conservative	John Loney	14,297	43.3	+0.6
New Democratic	Thomas Thompson	3,772	11.4	+0.8
Total valid votes		33,043	100.0	

1968 Canadian federal election
Party	Candidate	Votes	%	±%
Liberal	Ross Whicher	12,775	46.7	+7.1
Progressive Conservative	John Loney	11,674	42.7	-7.3
New Democratic	Eric Nelson	2,911	10.6	+0.1
Total valid votes		27,360	100.0	

1965 Canadian federal election
Party	Candidate	Votes	%	±%
Progressive Conservative	John Loney	6,846	49.9	-1.6
Liberal	Kent Lamont	5,424	39.6	-4.7
New Democratic	Thomas Morris	1,443	10.5	
Total valid votes		13,713	100.0	

1963 Canadian federal election
Party	Candidate	Votes	%	±%
Progressive Conservative	John Loney	7,451	51.5	-0.1
Liberal	John H. Mackenzie	6,401	44.3	+2.6
Independent	Alex Scarrow	611	4.2	
Total valid votes		14,463	100.0	

1962 Canadian federal election
Party	Candidate	Votes	%	±%
Progressive Conservative	Andrew E. Robinson	7,604	51.6	-10.7
Liberal	John H. Mackenzie	6,141	41.7	+4.0
Co-operative Commonwealth	Lorne Richards	706	4.8	
Social Credit	Sandy Macdonald	279	1.9	
Total valid votes		14,730	100.0	

1958 Canadian federal election
Party	Candidate	Votes	%	±%
Progressive Conservative	Andrew E. Robinson	8,225	62.3	+4.8
Liberal	Chester M. Merriam	4,975	37.7	-4.8
Total valid votes		13,200	100.0	

1957 Canadian federal election
Party	Candidate	Votes	%	±%
Progressive Conservative	Andrew E. Robinson	8,225	57.5	+6.3
Liberal	Donald B. Blue	6,089	42.5	-6.3
Total valid votes		14,314	100.0	

1953 Canadian federal election
Party	Candidate	Votes	%	±%
Progressive Conservative	Andrew E. Robinson	7,132	51.2	+1.0
Liberal	Donald B. Blue	6,808	48.8	+4.3
Total valid votes		13,940	100.0	

1949 Canadian federal election
Party	Candidate	Votes	%	±%
Liberal	Donald B. Blue	7,517	50.1	+5.8
Progressive Conservative	Andrew E. Robinson	6,685	44.6	-3.2
Co-operative Commonwealth	Aubrey John Mercer	795	5.3	
Total valid votes		14,997	100.0	

1945 Canadian federal election
Party	Candidate	Votes	%	±%
Progressive Conservative	Andrew E. Robinson	6,933	47.8	+6.3
Liberal	Carl Whicher	6,430	44.3	-14.1
Co-operative Commonwealth	Moffatt Jamieson	1,137	7.8	
Total valid votes		14,500	100.0	

Note: Progressive Conservative vote is compared to "National Government" vote in 1940 election.

1940 Canadian federal election
Party	Candidate	Votes	%	±%
Liberal	William Rae Tomlinson	7,420	58.4	+12.8
National Government	Leigh H. Snider	5,275	41.6	+7.1
Total valid votes		12,695	100.0	

Note: "National Government" vote is compared to Conservative vote in 1935 election.

1935 Canadian federal election
Party	Candidate	Votes	%
Liberal	William Rae Tomlinson	6,831	45.7
Conservative	Gideon H. Ruttle	5,149	34.4
Reconstruction	William Guy Nicholson	2,973	19.9
Total valid votes		14,953	100.0

== See also ==
- List of Canadian electoral districts
- Historical federal electoral districts of Canada
