= Barry Devolin =

Canadian politician and academic (born 1963)

Member of Parliament for Haliburton—Kawartha Lakes—Brock
- In office 2004 – August 4, 2015
- Preceded by: John O'Reilly
- Succeeded by: Jamie Schmale

Chair of the Standing Committee on Aboriginal Affairs
- In office 13 November 2007 – 2 February 2009
- Minister: Chuck Strahl
- Preceded by: Colin Mayes
- Succeeded by: Bruce Stanton

Personal details
- Born: March 10, 1963 (age 63) Peterborough, Ontario
- Party: Conservative (2003–present)
- Other political affiliations: Reform Party (1987–1997)

Barry Devolin (born March 10, 1963) is a former Member of Parliament in the House of Commons of Canada and an academic.

== Early life and education ==
Devolin was born in Peterborough and grew up in Haliburton. Devolin studied political science at Carleton University, where he graduated with a bachelor's degree in 1985. Two years later he received a master's degree in political science from the Stony Brook University on Long Island, New York.

In 1993, Devolin married Ursula Beachli. They have 2 children, George (2002) and Molly (2004). The Devolins live in Haliburton, Ontario.

== Academic career ==
In February 2017, Devolin was named chair of the Asian Studies Graduate Program at Sejong University. His research focuses on the socialization challenges facing North Korean defectors, and the ongoing Korean conflict.

Devolin began his teaching career in 1986 while a graduate student at Stony Brook University. He was awarded the 2014 Distinguished Alumni Award by Stony Brook University's Political Science department.

== Political career ==
In 2013, Barry Devolin announced he would not seek re-election in the 2015 federal election. His former executive assistant, Jamie Schmale, became the Conservative candidate for Haliburton-Kawartha Lakes-Brock, and was subsequently elected as a Member of Parliament in October 2015. Thus ended Devolin's 11-year career in the House of Commons, which included his service as Assistant Deputy Speaker, his last 7 years.

Prior to 2008, Devolin served on several Parliamentary Standing Committees, including as chair of the Standing Committee on Aboriginal Affairs and Northern Development (2006–08). Devolin was also active in various parliamentary associations, and chaired Canada-Korea, Canada-Azerbaijan and Canada-Belgium. In 2013, South Korean President Lee Myung-buk awarded the prestigious Order of Diplomatic Service Medal (Heung-in) to Devolin, the only Canadian to ever receive it.

In 2004 Devolin was nominated as the candidate for the new Conservative Party of Canada, and was elected in the 2004 election to represent the newly redistributed riding of Haliburton—Kawartha Lakes—Brock. He received 44% of the popular vote, defeating O'Reilly. In the 2006 election Devolin was re-elected with 49% of the vote. He was subsequently reelected in 2008 with 56% of the vote, and in 2011 with 60% of the vote.

Many years earlier, Devolin ran in the 1993 federal election as a member of the Reform Party in the riding of Victoria—Haliburton. Devolin placed second in the election, losing to John O'Reilly of the Liberals. Following the 1993 election, Devolin served as the director of research for the parliamentary caucus of the Reform Party. He spent time working in British Columbia and Korea, and in 1994 returned to Canada to assist Chris Hodgson to seek election to the Legislative Assembly of Ontario for Haliburton—Victoria—Brock. After this, he served as Hodgson's chief of staff. Devolin did not seek the nomination in Haliburton—Victoria—Brock in the 1997 and 2000 federal elections.

Over the years, Devolin held several senior political staff positions in the Canadian and Ontario governments, including chief of staff to Ontario Ministers Tim Hudak (1999–2000) and Chris Hodgson (1995–96), special assistant for education to Ontario Premier Mike Harris (1998–99), and director of research and question period strategist for the Reform Party of Canada under Preston Manning (1993–94). From 2000 to 2004, Devolin ran Shuter Street Associates, a strategic communications and planning consulting firm in Toronto.

Devolin served twice as campaign manager for Ontario Progressive Conservative candidates: in 1999 for former cabinet minister Brenda Elliott in the riding of Guelph-Wellington; and, In 1987 for Arthur Ward in the riding of Victoria-Halliburton.

== Electoral record ==
2011 Canadian federal election: Haliburton—Kawartha Lakes—Brock
Party	Candidate	Votes	%	±%
Conservative	Barry Devolin	35,192	60.0	+4.0
New Democratic	Lyn Edwards	12,934	22.1	+7.5
Liberal	Laura Redman	7,539	12.9	−7.5
Green	Susanne Lauten	2,963	5.1	−3.2
Total valid votes		58,628		
Total rejected ballots		163	0.27	−0.06
Turnout		58,791	63.72	
Eligible voters		92,201		

2008 Canadian federal election: Haliburton—Kawartha Lakes—Brock
Party	Candidate	Votes	%	±%	Expenditures
Conservative	Barry Devolin	30,391	55.95	+6.95	$80,504
Liberal	Marlene White	11,093	20.42	−8.33	$41,469
New Democratic	Stephen Yardy	7,952	14.64	−2.58	$14,201
Green	Michael Bell	4,505	8.29	+3.27	$2
Christian Heritage	Dave Switzer	374	0.69		$1,702
Total valid votes/expense limit		54,315	100.00		
Total rejected ballots		181			
Turnout		54,496	60.10	−7.47	
Electors on the lists		90,680			

2006 Canadian federal election: Haliburton—Kawartha Lakes—Brock
Party	Candidate	Votes	%	±%	Expenditures
Conservative	Barry Devolin	29,427	49.00	+4.77	$72,620
Liberal	Greg Walling	17,266	28.75	−5.76	$73,312
New Democratic	Anne MacDermid	10,340	17.22	+2.15	$17,989
Green	Andy Harjula	3,017	5.02	+0.30	$1,787
Total valid votes/expense limit		60,050	100.00		
Total rejected ballots		196			
Turnout		60,246	67.57	+3.35	
Electors on the lists		89,166			
Sources: Official Results, Elections Canada and Financial Returns, Elections Canada.

2004 Canadian federal election: Haliburton—Kawartha Lakes—Brock
Party	Candidate	Votes	%	Expenditures
Conservative	Barry Devolin	24,731	44.23	$62,433
Liberal	John O'Reilly	19,294	34.51	$32,357
New Democratic	Gil McElroy	8,427	15.07	$16,515
Green	Tim Holland	2,637	4.72	$150
Christian Heritage	Peter Vogel	493	0.88	$2,345
Independent	Charles Olito	330	0.59	$8,276
Total valid votes/expense limit		55,912	100.00	$86,102
Total rejected ballots		199		
Turnout		56,111	64.22	
Electors on the lists		87,371		
Percentage change figures are factored for redistribution. Conservative Party percentages are contrasted with the combined Canadian Alliance and Progressive Conservative percentages from 2000.
Sources: Official Results, Elections Canada and Financial Returns, Elections Canada.
