= Alex Ruff =

Canadian politician (born 1974)

Colonel Alex Ruff MSC CD MP

Member of Parliament for Bruce—Grey—Owen Sound
- Incumbent
- Assumed office October 21, 2019
- Preceded by: Larry Miller

Personal details
- Born: 1974 Owen Sound, Ontario, Canada
- Party: Conservative
- Education: Honours BSc
- Alma mater: Royal Military College of Canada
- Profession: Politician / retired military officer
- Awards: Meritorious Service Cross; Defense Meritorious Service Medal
- Website: https://www.alexruff.ca/

Military service
- Allegiance: Canada
- Branch/service: Land Force Command; Canadian Army
- Years of service: 1993–2019
- Rank: Colonel
- Unit: The Royal Canadian Regiment

Alex Ruff MSC CD MP (born 1974) is a Canadian politician who was elected to represent the riding of Bruce—Grey—Owen Sound in the House of Commons of Canada in the 2019 federal election and re-elected in both the 2021 Canadian federal election and 2025 Canadian federal election. He is a retired Colonel in the Canadian Armed Forces (CAF).

== Background and education ==
Ruff grew up on a farm just outside of Tara, Ontario. He is the eldest of five boys. He attended Arran-Tara Elementary School and Chesley District High School. Ruff graduated from the Royal Military College of Canada in 1997 with an honours degree in space science.

== Military career ==
As an infantry officer within The Royal Canadian Regiment and throughout his 25-year career, Ruff was posted to Garrison Petawawa, Kingston, CFB Gagetown, Canadian Forces College in Toronto, and to Canadian Special Operations Forces Command headquarters and Canadian Joint Operations Command both of which are in Ottawa. He had six operational deployments: Operation Recuperation (ice storm in eastern Ontario/western Quebec, 1998), twice as part of the Stabilisation Force in Bosnia and Herzegovina - Operation Palladium (Bosnia, 1998–99 and 2001), two tours in Afghanistan, first on Operation Athena (Kandahar, Afghanistan in 2007 and then on Operation Attention in Kabul, Afghanistan in 2012) and most recently as part of Combined Joint Task Force – Operation Inherent Resolve (Baghdad, Iraq in 2018–19). He retired from the CAF in early 2019.

== Federal politics ==
In April 2019, Ruff won the Conservative nomination for the riding of Bruce—Grey—Owen Sound for the 2019 federal election following the retirement of Larry Miller. He was elected as a Member of Parliament on October 21, 2019. He was a member of the Standing Committee on Veterans Affairs from February to August 2020. On September 02, 2020, he was appointed to the Conservative Party House Leadership team by Erin O’Toole as the Deputy Opposition Whip. He served in this role until November 2021. On September 20, 2021, he was re-elected as the MP for Bruce-Grey-Owen Sound. From December 9, 2021 until June 2022, he sat on the Standing Committee on Human Resources, Skills and Social Development and the Status of Persons with Disabilities (HUMA) and from December 13, 2021 until June 2022, he was a member on the Special Committee on Afghanistan (AFGH). Since June 2022, he has been a member of the National Security and Intelligence Committee of Parliamentarians. On April 28, 2025, he was re-elected again.

== Electoral record ==
2025 Canadian federal election: Bruce—Grey—Owen Sound
| Party | Candidate | Votes | % | ±% | Expenditures |
|---|---|---|---|---|---|
| Conservative | Alex Ruff | 35,484 | 53 | +3.09 | |
| Liberal | Anne Marie Watson | 26,837 | 40.1 | +14.24 | |
| New Democratic | Christopher Neudorf | 2,069 | 3.1 | –10.32 | |
| Green | Natasha Akiwenzie | 1,447 | 2.2 | –0.66 | |
| United | Ann Gillies | 554 | 0.8 | N/A | |
| People's | Pavel Smolko | 520 | 0.8 | –6.28 | |
| Total valid votes/expense limit | | 66,911 | 99.48 | | |
| Total rejected ballots | | 349 | 0.52 | | |
| Turnout | | 67,260 | 70.22 | +5.93 | |
| Eligible voters | | 95,783 | | | |
| Conservative hold | | Swing | | –5.58 | |
Source: Elections Canada

2021 Canadian federal election: Bruce—Grey—Owen Sound
| Party | Candidate | Votes | % | ±% | Expenditures |
|---|---|---|---|---|---|
| Conservative | Alex Ruff | 28,727 | 49.2 | +3.1 | $73,440.24 |
| Liberal | Anne Marie Watson | 14,738 | 25.2 | -4.9 | $50,410.51 |
| New Democratic | Christopher Neudorf | 7,939 | 13.6 | +1.9 | $8,224.88 |
| People's | Anna-Marie Fosbrooke | 4,697 | 8.0 | +5.2 | $7,061.94 |
| Green | Ashley Michelle Lawrence | 1,789 | 3.1 | -5.7 | $0.00 |
| Independent | Reima Kaikkonen | 524 | 0.9 | – | $9,850.00 |
| Total valid votes | | 58,414 | | | |
| Total rejected ballots | | 394 | | | |
| Turnout | | 58,808 | 64.29 | | |
| Eligible voters | | 91,472 | | | |
| Conservative hold | | Swing | | +4.0 | |
Source: Elections Canada

2019 Canadian federal election: Bruce—Grey—Owen Sound
| Party | Candidate | Votes | % | ±% | Expenditures |
|---|---|---|---|---|---|
| Conservative | Alex Ruff | 26,830 | 46.1 | -0.58 | $80,258.91 |
| Liberal | Michael Den Tandt | 17,485 | 30.1 | -8.74 | $85,055.44 |
| New Democratic | Chris Stephen | 6,797 | 11.7 | +0.57 | $6,077.71 |
| Green | Danielle Valiquette | 5,114 | 8.8 | +5.45 | none listed |
| People's | Bill Townsend | 1,614 | 2.8 | – | $0.00 |
| Libertarian | Daniel Little | 321 | 0.6 | – | $0.00 |
| Total valid votes/expense limit | | 58,161 | 100.0 | | |
| Total rejected ballots | | 303 | | | |
| Turnout | | 58,464 | 65.6 | | |
| Eligible voters | | 89,114 | | | |
| Conservative hold | | Swing | | +8.00 | |
Source: Elections Canada
