= Gary Gurbin =

Canadian politician

Gary Michael Gurbin (born 13 December 1941 in Essex, Ontario) is a former Progressive Conservative member of the House of Commons of Canada. He is a physician by career.

He won the Bruce—Grey electoral district seat in the 1979 federal election and was re-elected there in the 1980 and 1984 federal elections. He therefore served in the 31st, 32nd and 33rd Canadian Parliaments. He left federal politics in 1988 and did not run in that year's national election.

Gurbin resigned from the Progressive Conservative Party on 17 December 1981, citing concerns over party leader Joe Clark. He remained in the House of Commons as an independent member until rejoining the party on 28 January 1982.
