= Haliburton—Kawartha Lakes =

Federal electoral district in Ontario, Canada

Coordinates: 44.414°N 78.344°W

Ontario electoral district
- Interactive map of riding boundaries

Federal electoral district
- Legislature: House of Commons
MP
Jamie Schmale
Conservative
- District created: 1966
- First contested: 1968
- Last contested: 2025
- District webpage: profile, map

Demographics
- Population (2011): 110,182
- Electors (2015): 90,594
- Area (km²): 8,941
- Pop. density (per km²): 12.3
- Census division(s): Haliburton, Kawartha Lakes, Peterborough
- Census subdivision(s): Kawartha Lakes, Cavan Monaghan, Dysart, Dudley, Harcourt, Guilford, Harburn, Bruton, Havelock, Eyre and Clyde, Minden Hills, Trent Lakes (part), Highlands East, North Kawartha, Algonquin Highlands

Haliburton—Kawartha Lakes (formerly Haliburton—Victoria—Brock, Victoria—Haliburton and Haliburton—Kawartha Lakes—Brock) is a federal electoral district in central Ontario, Canada, that has been represented in the House of Commons of Canada since 1968.

Following the 2022 Canadian federal electoral redistribution, this riding lost the entirety of Brock to the new York—Durham riding and was renamed Haliburton—Kawartha Lakes. The new name and boundaries came into effect upon the call of the 2025 Canadian federal election.

== Geography ==
The district includes the City of Kawartha Lakes, Haliburton County, the Municipality of Trent Lakes, the Township of North Kawartha and also the Township of Cavan-Monaghan.

== Demographics ==
According to the 2021 Canadian census

Languages: 93.7% English
Religions: 53.1% Christian (15.1% Catholic, 12.4% United Church, 7.3% Anglican, 3.1% Presbyterian, 2.5% Baptist, 1.2% Pentecostal, 11.5% Other), 45.2% None
Median income: $40,000 (2020)
Average income: $51,300 (2020)

Panethnic groups in Haliburton—Kawartha Lakes—Brock (2011−2021)
Panethnic group	2021		2016		2011	
Panethnic group	Pop.	%	Pop.	%	Pop.	%
European (Note: Statistic includes all persons that did not make up part of a visible minority or an indigenous identity.)	111,745	93.46%	105,570	94.99%	103,595	96.15%
Indigenous	3,670	3.07%	3,205	2.88%	2,165	2.01%
South Asian	1,120	0.94%	580	0.52%	405	0.38%
African	955	0.8%	465	0.42%	450	0.42%
East Asian (Note: Statistic includes total responses of "Chinese", "Korean", and "Japanese" under visible minority section on census.)	775	0.65%	520	0.47%	585	0.54%
Southeast Asian (Note: Statistic includes total responses of "Filipino" and "Southeast Asian" under visible minority section on census.)	495	0.41%	400	0.36%	265	0.25%
Latin American	295	0.25%	75	0.07%	90	0.08%
Middle Eastern (Note: Statistic includes total responses of "West Asian" and "Arab" under visible minority section on census.)	135	0.11%	165	0.15%	20	0.02%
Other/multiracial (Note: Statistic includes total responses of "Visible minority, n.i.e." and "Multiple visible minorities" under visible minority section on census.)	380	0.32%	150	0.13%	140	0.13%
Total responses	119,560	97.68%	111,135	97.52%	107,745	97.76%
Total population	122,401	100%	113,956	100%	110,217	100%
Notes: Totals greater than 100% due to multiple origin responses. Demographics based on 2012 Canadian federal electoral redistribution riding boundaries.

== Riding associations ==
Riding associations are the local branches of the national political parties:

Party	Association name	CEO	HQ city
Conservative Party of Canada	Haliburton—Kawartha Lakes Conservative Association	Derrick G. Camphorst	Kawartha Lakes
Liberal Party of Canada	Haliburton—Kawartha Lakes Federal Liberal Association	Lawrence James Giles	Dysart, Dudley, Harcourt, Guilford, Harburn, Bruton, Havelock, Eyre and Clyde

== History ==
It was created in 1966 as "Victoria—Haliburton" from parts of Victoria, Peterborough and Hastings—Frontenac and ridings.

It consisted initially of

- in the County of Hastings: the Townships of Bangor, Carlow, Herschel, McClure, Monteagle and Wicklow;
- the County of Haliburton;
- in the County of Ontario: the Townships of Brock, Mara, Rama and Thorah, the islands in Lake Couchiching belonging to Rama Indian Reserve No. 32, but excluding all islands belonging to Georgina Island Indian Reserve No. 33;
- in the County of Peterborough: the Townships of Anstruther, Burleigh, Cavendish, Chandos, Galway and Harvey;
- the County of Victoria.

In 1976, the Township of Manvers in the county of Victoria, all parts of the county of Hastings, all townships other than the Township of Brock) in the Regional Municipality of Durham (formerly the County of Ontario) were excluded from the riding, and the Township of Georgina in the Regional Municipality of York was added.

In 1987, the riding was redefined to consist of the counties of Haliburton and Victoria, the Township of Brock in the Regional Municipality of Durham, and, in the County of Peterborough, the Village of Millbrook and the townships of Burleigh and Anstruther, Cavan, Chandos, Galway and Cavendish, and Harvey.

In 1996, it was redefined to consist of the County of Victoria, the Township of Brock in the Regional Municipality of Durham, the County of Haliburton (excluding the townships of Sherborne, McClintock, Livingstone, Lawrence and Nightingale), and the part of the County of Peterborough lying north of and including the townships of Burleigh and Anstruther, Chandos and Harvey, including the Village of Millbrook and the Township of Cavan.

The name of the electoral district was changed in 1998 to "Haliburton—Victoria—Brock".

The name of the electoral district was changed in 2003 when Victoria County became the city of Kawartha Lakes.

In 2013, the federal redistribution saw slight changes to the riding which removed the County of Peterborough Townships of Trent Lakes and North Kawartha. Both of these townships were placed in the new riding of Peterborough-Kawartha.

In 2023, the Township of Brock in the Regional Municipality of Durham was removed from the riding and placed in the new riding of York—Durham, and the County of Peterborough Townships of Trent Lakes and North Kawartha were added. As a consequence, the name of the electoral district changed to "Haliburton—Kawartha Lakes". These boundaries will be used at the first election held after April 22, 2024.

=== Member of Parliament ===
This riding has elected the following members of Parliament:

Parliament	Years	Member	Party
Victoria—Haliburton; Riding created from Hastings—Frontenac, Peterborough and Victoria
28th	1968–1972	William C. Scott	Progressive Conservative
29th	1972–1974	William C. Scott	Progressive Conservative
30th	1974–1979	William C. Scott	Progressive Conservative
31st	1979–1980	William C. Scott	Progressive Conservative
32nd	1980–1984	William C. Scott	Progressive Conservative
33rd	1984–1988	William C. Scott	Progressive Conservative
34th	1988–1993	William C. Scott	Progressive Conservative
35th	1993–1997	John O'Reilly	Liberal
36th	1997–2000	John O'Reilly	Liberal
Haliburton—Victoria—Brock
37th	2000–2004	John O'Reilly	Liberal
Haliburton—Kawartha Lakes—Brock
38th	2004–2006	Barry Devolin	Conservative
39th	2006–2008	Barry Devolin	Conservative
40th	2008–2011	Barry Devolin	Conservative
42nd	2015–2019	Jamie Schmale	Conservative
43rd	2019–2021	Jamie Schmale	Conservative
44th	2021–2025	Jamie Schmale	Conservative
Haliburton—Kawartha Lakes
45th	2025–present	Jamie Schmale	Conservative

== Election results ==
2025 Canadian federal election: Haliburton—Kawartha Lakes
** Preliminary results — Not yet official **
Party	Candidate	Votes	%	±%	Expenditures
Conservative	Jamie Schmale	42,676	56.56	+4.59	
Liberal	Nell Thomas	29,193	38.69	+14.82	
New Democratic	Alyea Teel	2,624	3.48	–10.75	
People's	Michael Penman	954	1.26	–5.59	
Total valid votes/expense limit					
Total rejected ballots					
Turnout		75,447	72.36		
Eligible voters		104,259			
Conservative notional hold		Swing		–5.12	
Source: Elections Canada

2021 federal election redistributed results
Party	Vote	%
Conservative	34,462	51.97
Liberal	15,826	23.87
New Democratic	9,438	14.23
People's	4,541	6.85
Green	1,628	2.46
Others	413	0.62

2021 Canadian federal election: Haliburton—Kawartha Lakes—Brock
Party	Candidate	Votes	%	±%	Expenditures
Conservative	Jamie Schmale	35,418	52.30	+3.24	$56,137.89
Liberal	Judi Forbes	15,645	23.10	-2.85	$37,302.49
New Democratic	Zac Miller	9,730	14.37	-0.35	$1,001.63
People's	Alison Davidson	4,769	7.04	+5.15	$8,830.55
Green	Angel Godsoe	1,696	2.50	-5.89	$3,273.95
Libertarian	Gene Balfour	463	0.68	–	$296.50
Total valid votes		67,721			
Total rejected ballots		493			
Turnout		68,214	66.52	-0.14	
Eligible voters		102,554			
Source: Elections Canada
Conservative hold		Swing		+3.05	

2019 Canadian federal election: Haliburton—Kawartha Lakes—Brock
Party	Candidate	Votes	%	±%	Expenditures
Conservative	Jamie Schmale	32,257	49.05	+4.22	$50,030.95
Liberal	Judi Forbes	17,067	25.95	-5.80	$41,518.07
New Democratic	Barbara Doyle	9,676	14.71	-4.72	$7,114.67
Green	Elizabeth Fraser	5,515	8.39	+4.40	none listed
People's	Gene Balfour	1,245	1.89	–	none listed
Total valid votes/expense limit		65,760	99.38		
Total rejected ballots		413	0.62		
Turnout		66,173	66.66		
Eligible voters		99,274			
Conservative hold		Swing		+5.01	
Source: Elections Canada

2015 Canadian federal election: Haliburton—Kawartha Lakes—Brock
Party	Candidate	Votes	%	±%	Expenditures
Conservative	Jamie Schmale	27,718	44.83	-15.21	$69,530.77
Liberal	David Marquis	19,634	31.75	+18.90	$45,773.96
New Democratic	Mike Perry	12,012	19.43	-2.64	$53,554.91
Green	Bill MacCallum	2,470	3.99	-1.05	$8,268.38
Total valid votes/Expense limit		61,834	100.00		$232,886.36
Total rejected ballots		203	0.33	–	
Turnout		62,037	68.02	–	
Eligible voters		91,208			
Conservative hold		Swing		-17.06	
Source: Elections Canada

2011 federal election redistributed results
Party	Vote	%
Conservative	32,842	60.04
New Democratic	12,069	22.06
Liberal	7,030	12.85
Green	2,760	5.05

2011 Canadian federal election: Haliburton—Kawartha Lakes—Brock
Party	Candidate	Votes	%	±%	Expenditures
Conservative	Barry Devolin	35,192	60.0	+4.0	–
New Democratic	Lyn Edwards	12,934	22.1	+7.5	–
Liberal	Laura Redman	7,539	12.9	-7.5	–
Green	Susanne Lauten	2,963	5.1	-3.2	–
Total valid votes		58,628	100.0	–	
Total rejected ballots		163	0.27	-0.06	
Turnout		58,791	63.72	–	
Eligible voters		92,201	–	–	

2008 Canadian federal election: Haliburton—Kawartha Lakes—Brock
Party	Candidate	Votes	%	±%	Expenditures
Conservative	Barry Devolin	30,391	56.0	+7.0	$81,076
Liberal	Marlene White	11,093	20.4	-8.4	$41,648
New Democratic	Stephen Yardy	7,952	14.6	-2.6	$14,356
Green	Michael Bell	4,505	8.3	+3.3	$2
Christian Heritage	Dave Switzer	374	0.7	-0.2	$1,702
Total valid votes/Expense limit		54,315	100.0	$95,767	
Rejected ballots		181	0.33		
Turnout		54,496			

2006 Canadian federal election
Party	Candidate	Votes	%	±%
Conservative	Barry Devolin	29,427	49.0	+4.8
Liberal	Greg Walling	17,266	28.8	-5.7
New Democratic	Anne MacDermid	10,340	17.2	+2.1
Green	Andy Harjula	3,017	5.0	+0.3
Total valid votes		60,050	100.0	

2004 Canadian federal election
Party	Candidate	Votes	%	±%
Conservative	Barry Devolin	24,731	44.2	-17.0
Liberal	John O'Reilly	19,294	34.5	+0.5
New Democratic	Gil J. McElroy	8,427	15.1	+10.2
Green	Tim Holland	2,637	4.7	
Christian Heritage	Peter Vogel	493	0.9	
Independent	Charles Olito	330	0.6	
Total valid votes		55,912	100.0	

Note: Conservative vote is compared to the total of the Canadian Alliance vote and Progressive Conservative vote in 2000 election.

2000 Canadian federal election
Party	Candidate	Votes	%	±%
Liberal	John O'Reilly	16,710	34.0	-0.1
Alliance	Pat Dunn	15,591	31.7	-0.2
Progressive Conservative	Laurie Scott	14,508	29.5	+2.8
New Democratic	Rick Denyer	2,409	4.9	-1.6
Total valid votes		49,218	100.0	

Note: Canadian Alliance vote is compared to the Reform vote in 1997 election.

1997 Canadian federal election
Party	Candidate	Votes	%	±%
Liberal	John O'Reilly	18,205	34.0	-2.6
Reform	Pat Dunn	17,024	31.8	+3.4
Progressive Conservative	Lorne Edward Chester	14,283	26.7	+4.6
New Democratic	Rick Denyer	3,456	6.5	+2.7
Canadian Action	Charles Olito	504	0.9	+0.6
Total valid votes		53,472	100.0	

Note: the popular vote for Canadian Action Party candidate Charles Olito is compared to his vote as a Canada Party candidate in the 1993 election.

1993 Canadian federal election
Party	Candidate	Votes	%	±%
Liberal	John O'Reilly	20,511	36.7	+1.9
Reform	Barry Devolin	15,916	28.5	
Progressive Conservative	Lorne Edward Chester	12,378	22.1	-24.7
Independent	Dennis Drainville	3,584	6.4	
New Democratic	Cathy Vainio	2,118	3.8	-13.5
National	Martin Doyle	620	1.1	
Christian Heritage	Donald Waterhouse	409	0.7	
Natural Law	David Hetherington	201	0.4	
Canada Party	Charles Olito	178	0.3	
Total valid votes		55,915	100.0	

1988 Canadian federal election
Party	Candidate	Votes	%	±%
Progressive Conservative	William C. Scott	22,270	46.8	-14.1
Liberal	Bruce Glass	16,549	34.8	+14.6
New Democratic	Cathy Vainio	8,203	17.2	-0.3
Libertarian	Sally Hayes	265	0.6	-0.1
Social Credit	Peter Rea	168	0.4	
Commonwealth of Canada	Archie J. Dobbins	113	0.2	
Total valid votes		47,568	100.0	

1984 Canadian federal election
Party	Candidate	Votes	%	±%
Progressive Conservative	William C. Scott	30,229	60.9	+12.5
Liberal	Bruce Glass	10,032	20.2	-9.3
New Democratic	Patrick Daniel	8,682	17.5	-3.7
Green	George K. Kerr	339	0.7	
Libertarian	Robert A. Durnin	324	0.7	-0.2
Total valid votes		49,606	100.0	

1980 Canadian federal election
Party	Candidate	Votes	%	±%
Progressive Conservative	William C. Scott	20,308	48.4	-9.9
Liberal	Ivan Rodd	12,388	29.5	+3.2
New Democratic	Patrick Daniel	8,884	21.2	+6.1
Libertarian	John Hayes	367	0.9	+0.7
Total valid votes		41,947	100.0	

1979 Canadian federal election
Party	Candidate	Votes	%	±%
Progressive Conservative	William C. Scott	26,624	58.3	+4.8
Liberal	David Logan	12,004	26.3	-7.2
New Democratic	Patrick Daniel	6,872	15.1	+2.1
Libertarian	Gabriel Moldovanyi	100	0.2	
Marxist–Leninist	Barbara Harris	49	0.1	
Total valid votes		45,649	100.0	

1974 Canadian federal election
Party	Candidate	Votes	%	±%
Progressive Conservative	William C. Scott	17,570	53.5	-4.1
Liberal	David Walling	11,002	33.5	+3.2
New Democratic	Maurice Windatt	4,245	12.9	+1.0
Total valid votes		32,817	100.0	

1972 Canadian federal election
Party	Candidate	Votes	%	±%
Progressive Conservative	William C. Scott	18,450	57.7	+10.1
Liberal	David R. Walling	9,711	30.4	-8.3
New Democratic	Maurice Windatt	3,826	12.0	-0.8
Total valid votes		31,987	100.0	

1968 Canadian federal election
Party	Candidate	Votes	%
Progressive Conservative	William C. Scott	12,621	47.6
Liberal	Dave Logan	10,263	38.7
New Democratic	Allan Gordon McPhail	3,374	12.7
Independent	Harvie James Armstrong	258	1.0
Total valid votes		26,516	100.0

== Student vote results ==
2025 Haliburton—Kawartha Lakes student vote
52.10%	25.32%	13.06%	9.51%
Conservative	Liberal	NDP	PPC

== See also ==
- List of Canadian electoral districts
- Historical federal electoral districts of Canada
