= William C. Scott =

Canadian politician

Official 1988 portrait

William C. Scott, PC (October 6, 1921 – April 17, 1998) was a Canadian politician.

A Progressive Conservative, Scott, a merchant by profession, was first elected to the House of Commons of Canada in the 1965 federal election representing the Ontario riding of Victoria. The riding was renamed Victoria—Haliburton, and Scott was re-elected as its Member of Parliament (MP) in seven successive elections. He served as a backbencher until 1989 when he was appointed parliamentary secretary to the Minister of Veterans Affairs. On July 1, 1992, Scott was appointed to the Queen's Privy Council for Canada in recognition of his long political service. The appointment allowed him to be addressed as The Honourable William C. Scott.

His daughter, Laurie Scott, is the Progressive Conservative member of the Legislative Assembly of Ontario representing the riding of Haliburton—Kawartha Lakes—Brock.
