= Andrew Ernest Robinson =

Canadian politician

Member of Parliament for Bruce
- In office June 1945 – June 1949

Member of Parliament for Bruce
- In office August 1953 – February 1963

Personal details
- Born: 27 November 1893 Kincardine Township, Ontario, Canada
- Died: 13 May 1964 (aged 70)
- Party: Progressive Conservative
- Profession: farmer, insurance agent

Andrew Ernest Robinson (27 November 1893 – 13 May 1964) was a Canadian farmer, businessman and politician. Robinson was a Progressive Conservative party member of the House of Commons of Canada. He was born in Kincardine Township, Ontario and became a farmer and insurance agent by career.

He was first elected at the Bruce riding in the 1945 general election and served in the 20th Canadian Parliament. In the following election in 1949, Robinson was defeated by Donald Buchanan Blue of the Liberal party, but reclaimed the Bruce riding in the 1953 election and was re-elected there for successive terms in the 1957, 1958 and 1962 federal elections. Robinson left federal office in 1963 after completing his term in the 25th Canadian Parliament.
