= Shane Jolley =

Canadian politician (born 1971/72)

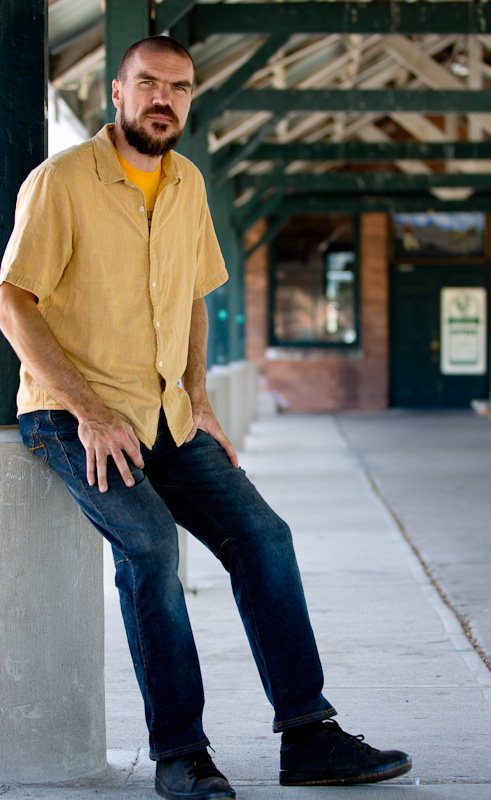
- Jolley in 2011

Male Deputy Leader of the Green Party of Ontario
- In office 2008–2011
- Succeeded by: Kevin O’Donnell

Personal details
- Born: 1971 (age 54–55) Meaford, Ontario, Ontario
- Party: Independent (2011-Present); Green Party of Canada (2006-2011); Green Party of Ontario (2007-2011)
- Children: 3
- Occupation: Small business owner

Shane Jolley (born 1971/72) is a Canadian politician, small-business owner, and cycling advocate. From 2008 to 2011, Jolley served as the male deputy leader for the Green Party of Ontario.

== Early life ==
Jolley was born in Meaford, Ontario to Ralph Jolley and Joanne Goff.

After living in Ottawa for four years following high school, Jolley returned home. In 1995, Jolley began working with his father in the family's store, Jolley’s Cycle Centre, outside Meaford. In 2000, following a restructuring of the business, Jolley established Jolley’s Alternative Wheels and, in 2001, moved the business to 2nd Ave. E. in Owen Sound.

== Federal politics ==
Jolley stood as the Green Party of Canada's candidate in the riding of Bruce-Grey-Owen Sound in the 2006 Federal Election. Placing third with 12.91% of the vote, Jolley was the highest polling Green candidate in Canada.

== Provincial politics ==
In the 2007 provincial election, Jolley was the Green Party's candidate in Bruce—Grey—Owen Sound and came in second place with more than 33 per cent of the vote, giving Jolley the best finish of any Green Party candidate in a Canadian federal or provincial election at that time.

Following the election, Jolley defeated three other candidates to be elected Green Party of Ontario male deputy leader at the party's annual convention in 2008, serving alongside Judy Smith Torrie as the party's female deputy leader.

Jolley declined to run for the Green Party nomination for the 2011 election, withdrawing suddenly from the nomination race against Municipality of West Grey councillor Don Marshall. In October 2011, Jolley announced he would be standing as an independent candidate in the 2011 election. Jolley highlighted his fiscally-conservative, socially-liberal attitudes, praising portions of the Progressive Conservative platform, calling for local solutions to issues, and attacking rigid partisanship. Jolley finished fifth with 3.58% of the vote.

== Personal life ==
In 2008, Jolley was sentenced to probation after he pled guilty to a trespassing charge. Jolley had been personally investigating a spate of thefts of high-priced bicycles in Owen Sound and mistakenly found himself on the property of two local residents. Jolley attempted to personally apologize for the incident, but the homeowners opted to pursue legal action.

Jolley lives in Owen Sound with his wife and three daughters.

== Electoral record ==
2011 Ontario general election: Bruce—Grey—Owen Sound
Party	Candidate	Votes	%	±%
Progressive Conservative	Bill Walker	19,567	47.37	+0.76
Liberal	Kevin Eccles	10,889	26.36	+11.44
New Democratic	Paul Johnstone	6,133	14.85	+11.06
Green	Don Marshall	2,654	6.43	–26.71
Independent	Shane Jolley	1,478	3.58	–29.56
Family Coalition	Joel Kidd	339	0.82	–0.39
Libertarian	Jay Miller	246	0.60	–
Total valid votes		41,306	99.60	
Total rejected, unmarked and declined ballots		164	0.40	–0.14
Turnout		41,470	54.70	–5.25
Eligible voters		75,809		
Progressive Conservative hold		Swing		–5.34
Source: Elections Ontario

2007 Ontario general election: Bruce—Grey—Owen Sound
Party	Candidate	Votes	%	±%
Progressive Conservative	Bill Murdoch	21,156	46.61	–5.46
Green	Shane Jolley	15,039	33.14	+31.42
Liberal	Selwyn Hicks	6,774	14.93	–18.28
New Democratic	Paul Johnstone	1,721	3.79	–5.49
Family Coalition	Irma Nicolette DeVries	550	1.21	–1.21
Reform	William (Bill) Cook	145	0.32	–0.99
Total valid votes		45,385	99.47	
Total rejected, unmarked and declined ballots		243	0.53	+0.05
Turnout		45,628	59.96	–2.94
Eligible voters		76,102		
Progressive Conservative hold		Swing		–18.44
Source: Elections Ontario

Bruce—Grey—Owen Sound - 2006 Canadian federal election
Party	Candidate	Votes	%	±%	
Conservative	Larry Miller	25,133	48.18%	+3.18%	$72,117
Liberal	Verona Jackson	14,378	27.56%	-8.21%	$52,377
Green	Shane Jolley	6,735	12.91%	+8.74%	$17,349
New Democratic	Jill McIllwraith	5,918	11.34%	-1.74%	$11,210
