= 1993 Progressive Conservative leadership election =

1993 Progressive Conservative Party leadership election
- June 13, 1993

3,469 delegates in the 1st ballot 1,735 delegate votes needed to win
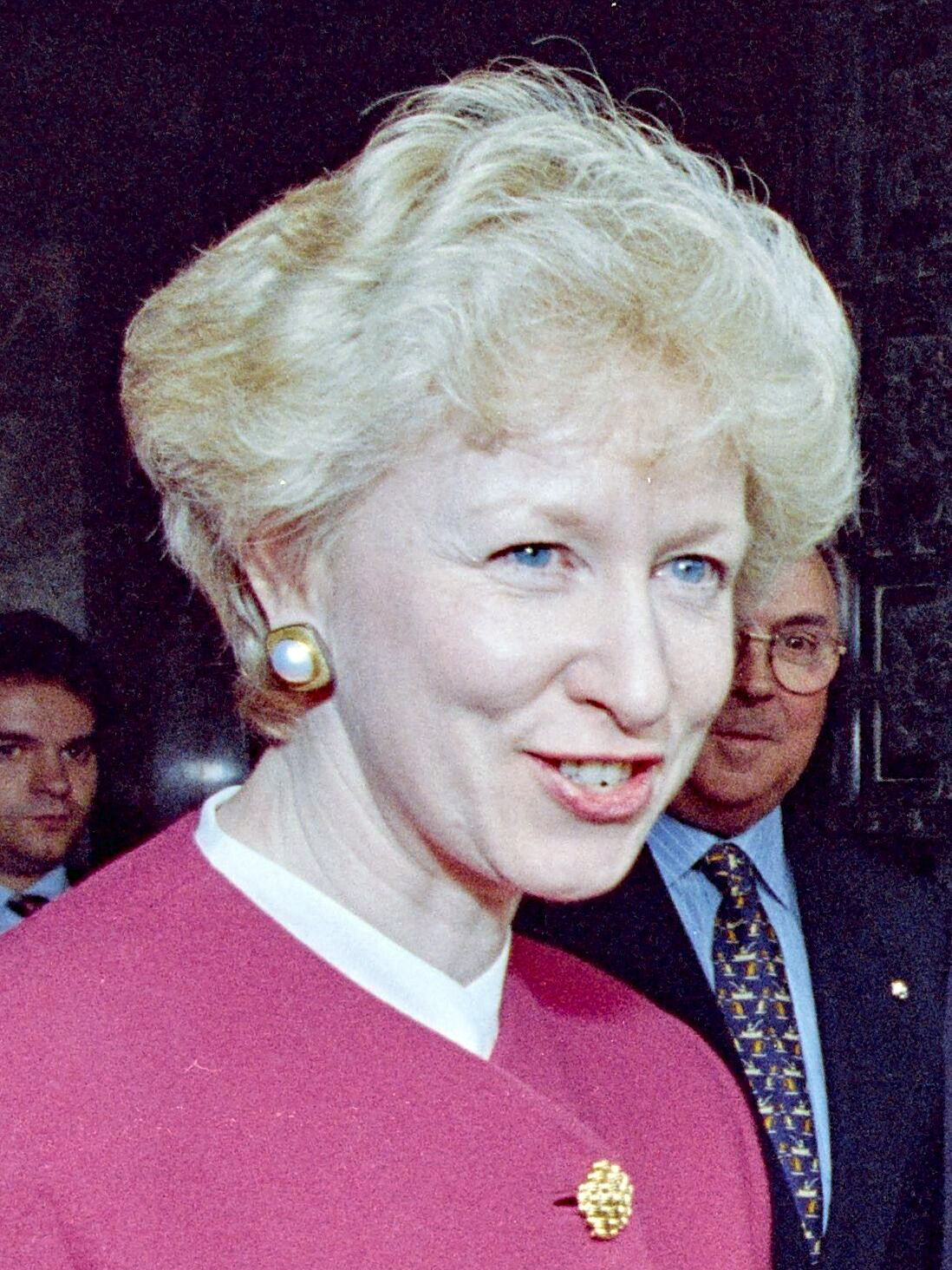

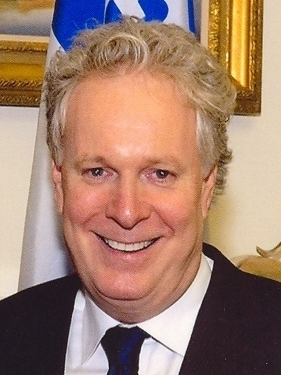
Candidate	Kim Campbell	Jean Charest
Second ballot delegate count	1,817 (52.7%)	1,630 (47.3%)
First ballot delegate count	1,664 (48.0%)	1,369 (39.5%)
Leader before election
Brian Mulroney
Elected Leader
Kim Campbell

1993 Progressive Conservative leadership election
- Date: June 13, 1993
- Convention: Ottawa Civic Centre, Ottawa, Ontario
- Resigning leader: Brian Mulroney
- Won by: Kim Campbell
- Ballots: 2
- Candidates: 5
- Entrance fee: C$
- Spending limit: None

The 1993 Progressive Conservative leadership election was held on June 13, 1993, to choose the successor to Brian Mulroney as leader of the Progressive Conservative Party of Canada and, consequently, prime minister of Canada. Kim Campbell won the vote on the second ballot and was sworn in as prime minister on June 25, 1993, becoming Canada's first female prime minister.

Initially, Campbell's popularity caused very few prominent Progressive Conservatives to enter the race, with Michael Wilson, Perrin Beatty, Barbara McDougall, and Joe Clark not making expected runs. Jean Charest had to be convinced by Mulroney to run, but once in the race, he ran an energetic campaign directed by established party organizers loyal to Mulroney, who would later lead the 1993 federal election campaign team. That turned the race from a coronation into a divisive grass roots battle for delegates.

== Candidates ==
=== Patrick Boyer ===
Background

Aged 48

MP for Etobicoke—Lakeshore, Ontario (1984–1993)
Parliamentary Secretary to the Secretary of State for External Affairs (1989–1991)
Parliamentary Secretary to the Minister of National Defence (1991–1993)
Parliamentary Secretary to the Minister of Industry, Science and Technology (1993)

=== Kim Campbell ===
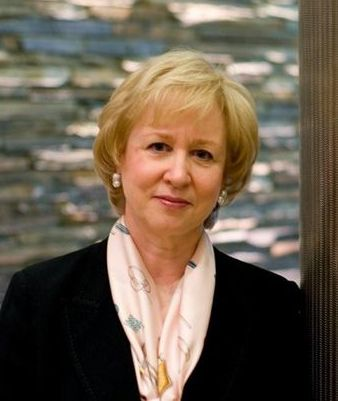
Kim Campbell

Background

Aged 46

MP for Vancouver Centre, British Columbia (1988–1993)
BC Social Credit MLA for Vancouver-Point Grey (1986–1988).
Minister of Justice (1990–1993)
Minister responsible for Federal-Provincial Relations (1993)
Minister of Veterans Affairs (1993)
Minister of National Defence (1993)

Supporters

- MPs: (42) Edna Anderson, Simcoe Centre; Ken Atkinson, St. Catharines; Bill Attewell, Markham; Perrin Beatty, Wellington—Grey—Dufferin—Simcoe; Ross Belsher, Fraser Valley East; Jean-Pierre Blackburn, Jonquière; Pierre Blais, Bellechasse; Don Blenkarn, Mississauga South; John Bosley, Don Valley West; Mary Collins, Capilano—Howe Sound; Robert Corbett, Fundy—Royal; Charles Deblois, Montmorency—Orléans; Suzanne Duplessis, Louis-Hébert; Benno Friesen, Surrey—White Rock; Barbara Greene, Don Valley North; Tom Hockin, London West; Bob Horner, Mississauga West; Jean-Guy Hudon, Beauharnois—Salaberry; Ken Hughes, Macleod; Monique Landry, Blainville—Deux-Montagnes; Doug Lewis, Simcoe North; Gilles Loiselle, Langelier; Shirley Martin, Lincoln; Marcel Masse, Frontenac; Charles Mayer, Lisgar—Marquette; Peter McCreath, South Shore; Walter McLean, Waterloo; Gerald Merrithew, Saint John; Rob Nicholson, Niagara Falls; Ross Reid, St. John’s East; John Reimer, Kitchener; Lee Richardson, Calgary Southeast; Larry Schneider, Regina—Wascana; Tom Siddon, Richmond; Bobbie Sparrow, Calgary Southwest; Ross Stevenson, Durham; Blaine Thacker, Lethbridge; Greg Thompson, Carleton—Charlotte; Scott Thorkelson, Edmonton—Strathcona; Bernard Valcourt, Madawaska—Victoria; Stan Wilbee, Delta; Michael Wilson, Etobicoke Centre
- Senators: (3) Norm Atkins; Mario Beaulieu; Lowell Murray

=== Jean Charest ===
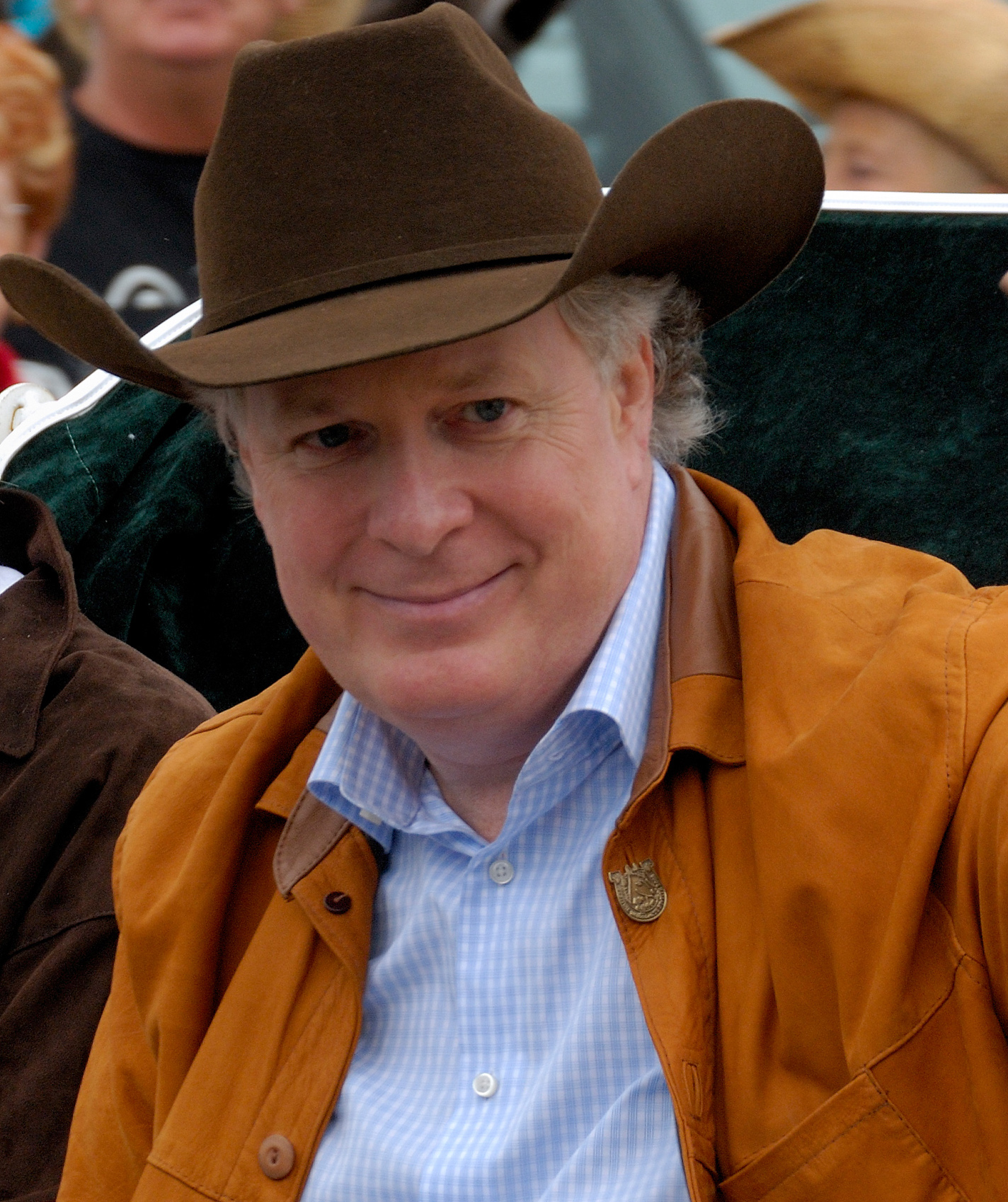
Jean Charest

Background

Aged 34

MP for Sherbrooke, Quebec (1984–1993)
Minister of State (Youth) (1986–1990)
Minister of the Environment (1991–1993)

Supporters

- MPs: (37) Gilles Bernier, Beauce; Gabrielle Bertrand, Brome—Missisquoi; Bud Bird, Fredericton; Pauline Browes, Scarborough Centre; Pierre Cadieux, Vaudreuil; Bill Casey, Cumberland—Colchester; Joe Clark, Yellowhead; Lee Clark, Brandon—Souris; Terry Clifford, London—Middlesex; Jean Corbeil, Anjou—Rivière-des-Prairies; Robert de Cotret, Berthier—Montcalm; John Crosbie, St. John's West; Stan Darling, Parry Sound-Muskoka; Vincent Della Noce, Duvernay; Gabriel Desjardins, Drummond; Dorothy Dobbie, Winnipeg South; Darryl Gray, Bonaventure—Îles-de-la-Madeleine; Jean-Guy Guilbault, Témiscamingue; Lenard Gustafson, Souris—Moose Mountain; André Harvey, Chicoutimi; Jim Hawkes, Calgary West; Otto Jelinek, Oakville—Milton; Al Johnson, Calgary North; Fernand Jourdenais, La Prairie; Robert Layton, Lachine—Lac-Saint-Louis; Elmer MacKay, Central Nova; Arnold Malone, Crowfoot; John McDermid, Brampton; Barbara McDougall, St. Paul's; Bill McKnight, Kindersley—Lloydminster; Gus Mitges, Bruce—Grey; Ken Monteith, Elgin; Guy St-Julien, Abitibi; Geoffrey Scott, Hamilton—Wentworth; Pat Sobeski, Cambridge; Monique Vézina, Rimouski—Témiscouata; Robert Wenman, Fraser Valley West
- Senators: (2) Jim Kelleher; Heath MacQuarrie

=== Jim Edwards ===
Background

Aged 56

MP for Edmonton Southwest, Alberta (1984–1993)
Parliamentary Secretary to the Minister of Communications (1985–1986; 1989–1991)
Parliamentary Secretary to the Minister of Indian Affairs and Northern Development (1988–1989)
Parliamentary Secretary to the Minister of State (Agriculture) (1991–1992)
Parliamentary Secretary to the Minister of Consumer and Corporate Affairs (1991–1992)

Supporters

- MPs: (14) Harry Brightwell, Perth—Wellington—Waterloo; Albert Cooper, Peace River; Bill Domm, Peterborough; Doug Fee, Red Deer; Girve Fretz, Erie; Marie Gibeau, Bourassa; Bruce Halliday, Oxford; Jean-Pierre Hogue, Outremont; Felix Holtmann, Portage—Interlake; Bill Kempling, Burlington; Brian O'Kurley, Elk Island; Robert Harold Porter, Medicine Hat; Walter Van De Walle, St. Albert; William Winegard, Guelph—Wellington
- Senators: (3) John Buchanan; Mike Forrestall; Finlay MacDonald

=== Garth Turner ===
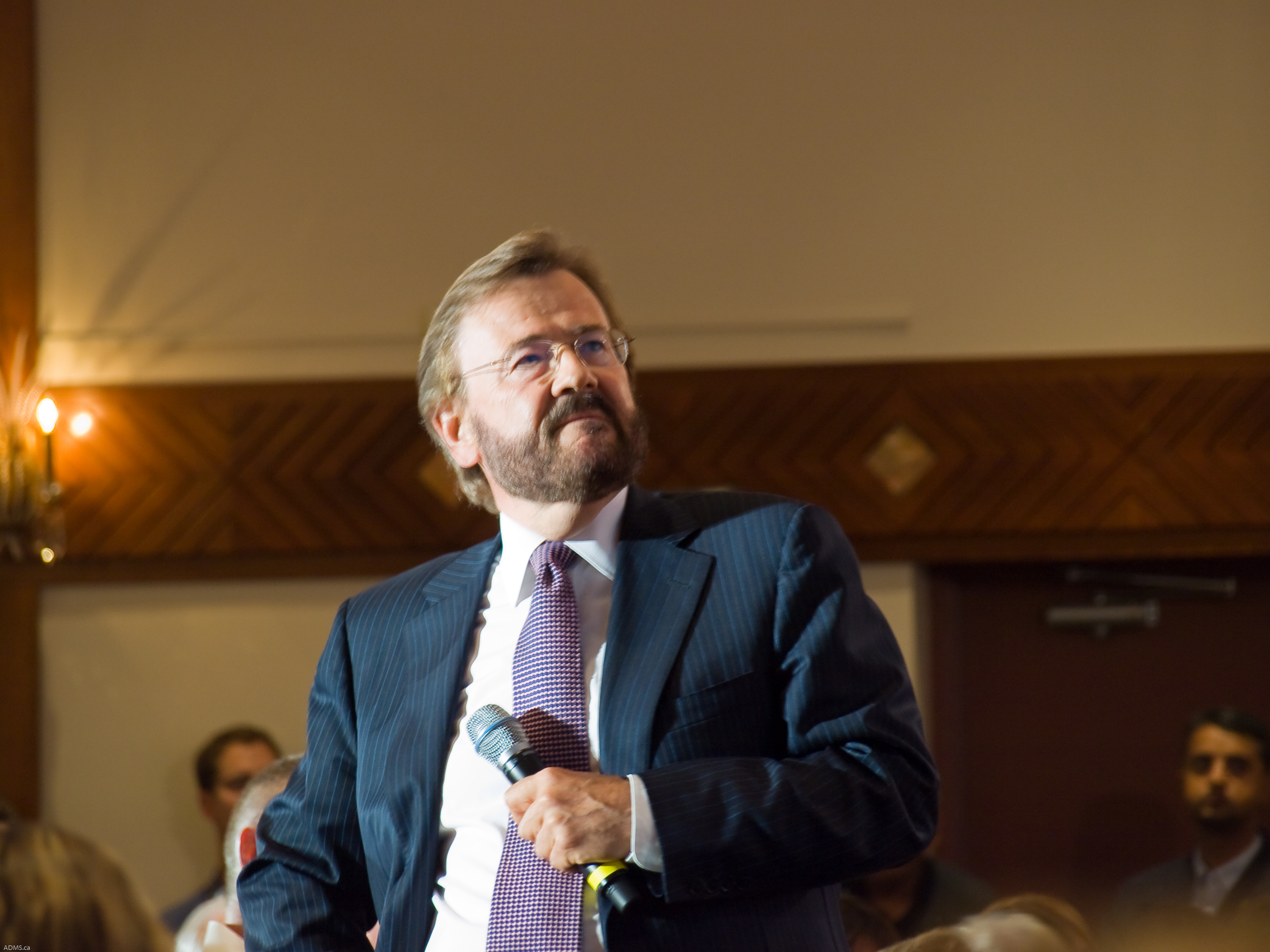
Garth Turner

Background

Aged 54

MP for Halton—Peel, Ontario (1988–1993)

== Endorsements ==
Kim Campbell received the most endorsements from sitting MPs, with 43 backing her. 38 declared their support for Jean Charest, while 15 backed Jim Edwards. Patrick Boyer and Garth Turner were both sitting MPs and neither were supported by any other sitting MP.

Candidate		BC	AB	SK	MB	ON	QC	NB	NS	PE	NL	NT	YT	Total
Patrick Boyer	Members:	–	–	–	–	1	–	–	–	–	–	–	–	1
Kim Campbell	Members:	6	5	–	1	16	8	4	2	–	1	–	–	43
Jean Charest	Members:	1	4	2	2	10	15	1	2	–	1	–	–	38
Jim Edwards	Members:	–	6	–	1	6	2	–	–	–	–	–	–	15
Garth Turner	Members:	–	–	–	–	1	–	–	–	–	–	–	–	1
Unaffiliated	Members:	–	7	–	3	–	–	–	–	–	–	–	–	–

== Results ==
Though it was initially expected that Campbell's election as party leader would be little more than a formality, as the convention drew nearer it became apparent that Charest's candidacy was proving far more popular than Campbell and her team had expected, and that she might struggle to defeat him on the first round. Sure enough, Campbell narrowly failed to win outright, coming 60 delegates short of immediate victory. Charest placed a solid second, with none of the other candidates managing to break ten percent of the overall delegate count.

Edwards, who had placed third, agreed to drop out and endorse Campbell prior to the second round, which gave her the support she needed to claim victory. Despite Edwards' endorsement, however, only about half of his delegates actually did move to support Campbell; the remaining half instead backed Charest, along with virtually all of Turner's and Boyer's delegates. This left Campbell's final total as 52.7% of the delegates, making this second-only to Joe Clark's shock win over Claude Wagner in 1976 as the most closely contested Progressive Conservative leadership contest.

Delegate support by ballot
Candidate	1st ballot		2nd ballot	
Candidate	Votes cast	%	Votes cast	%
Kim Campbell	1,664	48.0%	1,817	52.7%
Jean Charest	1,369	39.5%	1,630	47.3%
Jim Edwards	307	8.8%	Endorsed Campbell	
Garth Turner	76	2.2%	Withdrew; Did not endorse	
Patrick Boyer	53	1.5%	Endorsed Charest	
Total	3,469	100.0%	3,447	100.0%

First round
Campbell	47.97%
Charest	39.46%
Edwards	8.85%
Turner	2.19%
Boyer	1.53%

Final round
Campbell	52.71%
Charest	47.29%
