= Dufferin—Peel—Wellington—Grey =

Dufferin—Peel—Wellington—Grey could refer to:

- Dufferin—Peel—Wellington—Grey (federal electoral district)
- Dufferin—Peel—Wellington—Grey (provincial electoral district)
