= Perrin Beatty =

Canadian corporate executive and former politician

The Honourable Perrin Beatty PC OC

Secretary of State for External Affairs
- In office June 24, 1993 – November 3, 1993
- Prime Minister: Kim Campbell
- Preceded by: Barbara McDougall
- Succeeded by: André Ouellet

Member of Parliament for Wellington—Grey—Dufferin—Simcoe (Wellington—Dufferin—Simcoe; 1979–1988) (Wellington—Grey; 1972–1979)
- In office October 30, 1972 – October 24, 1993
- Preceded by: Marvin Howe
- Succeeded by: Murray Calder

Personal details
- Born: Henry Perrin Beatty; June 1, 1950 (age 76) Toronto, Ontario, Canada
- Party: Progressive Conservative
- Spouse: Julie Beatty
- Children: Christopher Beatty Patrick Beatty
- Profession: Businessman, Corporate Executive, Politician

Henry Perrin Beatty PC OC (born June 1, 1950) is a Canadian corporate executive and former politician, who served as a Progressive Conservative of the House of Commons from 1972 to 1993, and as a cabinet minister from 1979 to 1980 and again from 1984 to 1993.

== Life and career ==
Beatty is a graduate of Upper Canada College in Toronto, Ontario, and of the University of Western Ontario in London.

He first won election to the House of Commons of Canada as a Progressive Conservative at the age of 22 in the 1972 election.

In 1979 he became, at the time, the youngest person ever appointed to a Canadian Cabinet when Prime Minister Joe Clark made Beatty his minister of state for the Treasury Board in his short-lived government. Beatty returned to the opposition benches as a result of the defeat of the Clark government in the 1980 election.

With the Conservative victory in the 1984 election, Prime Minister Brian Mulroney made Beatty Minister of National Revenue and Minister responsible for Canada Post. He subsequently served as Solicitor General of Canada (1985–1986), Minister of National Defence (1986–1989), Minister of National Health and Welfare (1989–1991), and Minister of Communications (1991–1993).

Despite long being touted as a future Tory leader, Beatty did not run in the 1993 Progressive Conservative leadership election to succeed Mulroney. He was promoted to Secretary of State for External Affairs in the short-lived government of Mulroney's successor, Kim Campbell, but lost his seat in the 1993 election which returned only two Tory MPs.

In 1995 the Liberal government of Prime Minister Jean Chrétien appointed Beatty President and Chief Executive Officer of the Canadian Broadcasting Corporation, a position he held until 1999 when he became president and CEO of Canadian Manufacturers & Exporters, a business association that promotes the interests of Canadian industry and exporters.

In August 2007 Beatty left the CME to become president and CEO of the Canadian Chamber of Commerce. Beatty served as Chancellor of the University of Ontario Institute of Technology (UOIT) in Oshawa, Ontario from 2008 to 2015. He has received honorary degrees from UOIT and Western University.

In 2012 Beatty received an honorary Certified International Trade Professional (CITP) designation from the Forum for International Trade Training.

In May 2020, Beatty was appointed to serve on Canada's COVID-19 Supply Council.

== Honors ==
- Order of the Rising Sun, 2nd Class, Gold and Silver Star (2020)

Order of Canada (2018)

== Publications ==
- Book chapter: Hong Kong: Canada's Partner in Prosperity, 2011

25th Canadian Ministry (1993) – Cabinet of Kim Campbell
Cabinet post (1)
Predecessor	Office	Successor
Barbara McDougall	Secretary of State for External Affairs; 1993	André Ouellet
24th Canadian Ministry (1984–1993) – Cabinet of Brian Mulroney
Cabinet posts (5)
Predecessor	Office	Successor
Marcel Masse	Minister of Communications; 1991–1993	Monique Landry
Jake Epp	Minister of National Health and Welfare; 1989–1991	Benoît Bouchard
Erik Nielsen	Minister of National Defence; 1986–1989	Bill McKnight
Elmer MacKay	Solicitor General of Canada; 1985–1986	James Kelleher
Roy MacLaren	Minister of National Revenue; 1984–1985	Elmer MacKay
21st Canadian Ministry (1979–1980) – Cabinet of Joe Clark
Cabinet post (1)
Predecessor	Office	Successor
	Minister of State (Treasury Board); 1979–1980	
Parliament of Canada
Preceded by Riding Created	Member of Parliament for Wellington—Grey—Dufferin—Simcoe; 1988–1993	Succeeded by Murray Calder
Preceded by Riding Created	Member of Parliament for Wellington—Dufferin—Simcoe; 1979–1988	Succeeded by Riding Abolished
Preceded by Marvin Howe	Member of Parliament for Wellington—Grey—Dufferin—Waterloo; 1972–1979	Succeeded by Riding Abolished
Government offices
Preceded by Anthony S. Manera	President of the Canadian Broadcasting Corporation; 1995–1999	Succeeded by Robert Rabinovitch
Other offices
Preceded by Lyn McLeod	Chancellor of the University of Ontario Institute of Technology; 2008-2016	Succeeded by Noreen Taylor
