= David Tilson =

Canadian politician

David Allan Tilson
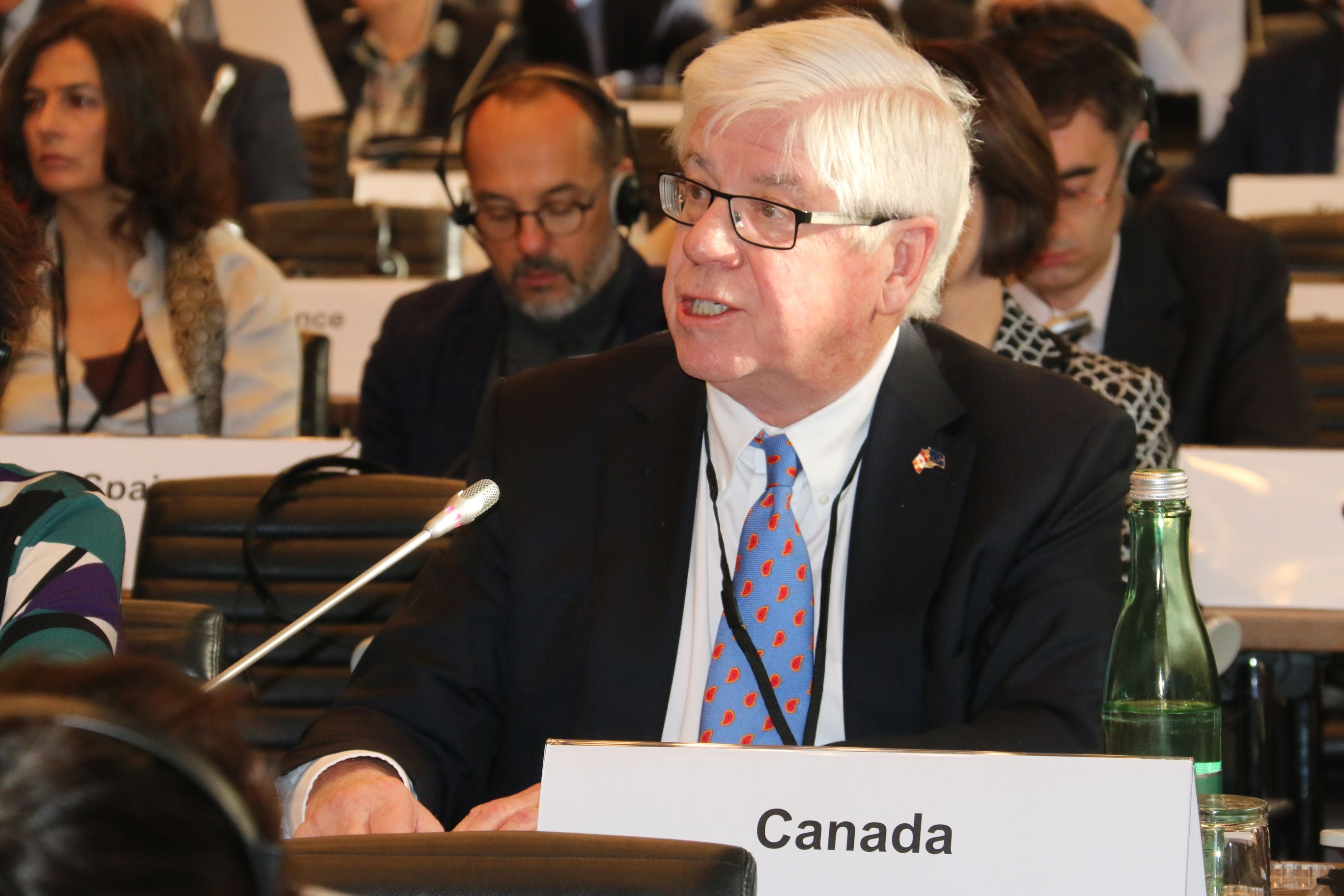

Member of Parliament for Dufferin—Caledon
- In office June 28, 2004 – September 11, 2019
- Preceded by: Murray Calder
- Succeeded by: Kyle Seeback

Member of the Ontario Provincial Parliament for Dufferin—Peel—Wellington—Grey Dufferin—Peel (1990-1999)
- In office September 6, 1990 – April 2, 2002
- Preceded by: Mavis Wilson
- Succeeded by: Ernie Eves

Chair of the Standing Committee on Citizenship & Immigration
- In office February 3, 2009 – August 2, 2015
- Minister: Jason Kenney; Chris Alexander
- Preceded by: Norman Doyle
- Succeeded by: Borys Wrzesnewskyj

Personal details
- Born: March 19, 1941 (age 85) Toronto, Ontario, Canada
- Party: Progressive Conservative, 1990-2002; Conservative, 2002-Present
- Spouse: Judith Tilson
- Profession: Lawyer

David Allan Tilson (born March 19, 1941) is a politician in Ontario, Canada. He was a Progressive Conservative member of the Legislative Assembly of Ontario from 1990 to 2002, and served as the Member of Parliament (MP) for the riding of Dufferin—Caledon from 2004 to 2019 as a member of the Conservative Party. When he left office, he was the oldest serving MP in the 42nd Parliament.

== Background ==
Tilson was educated at the University of New Brunswick and Queen's University, and began practicing law in Orangeville, Ontario in 1970. He served as a trustee on the Dufferin County Board of Education for two terms, and then as a municipal councillor in Orangeville for six years. In the latter capacity, he was the founding Chair of Orangeville's Blue Box program and a Director of the Association of Municipalities of Ontario. He also served on the board of Westminster United Church.

== Ontario politics ==
Tilson was elected to the Ontario legislature in the provincial election of 1990, defeating incumbent Liberal Mavis Wilson in Dufferin—Peel by 572 votes. The New Democratic Party won this election, and Tilson spent the next five years as an opposition member.

The Ontario Tories won a majority government in the provincial election of 1995, and Tilson greatly increased his margin of victory, defeating Wilson by almost 15,000 votes in a rematch. He was appointed chair of the government caucus in November 1997.

Tilson won another landslide re-election victory for the new riding of Dufferin—Peel—Wellington—Grey in the 1999 election. On April 2, 2002, he resigned his seat in the legislature to allow Premier Ernie Eves (who had been elected party leader without holding a seat) to run as a parachute candidate in a by-election. In 2003–04, he served as vice-chair of the Ontario Municipal Board.

== Federal politics ==
Tilson ran for the House of Commons of Canada in the federal election of 2004 and defeated incumbent Liberal Murray Calder by a margin of 43% to 39% in the new riding of Dufferin—Caledon.

Tilson supported plans to cut farm support programs, including the AgriRecovery Program, by $2 billion over the next year.

Tilson did not run for reelection in the 2019 federal election.

== Electoral record ==
=== Federal ===
2015 Canadian federal election: Dufferin—Caledon
Party	Candidate	Votes	%	±%	Expenditures
Conservative	David Tilson	27,977	46.28	-12.73	$89,524.29
Liberal	Ed Crewson	23,643	39.11	+26.01	$98,995.67
Green	Nancy Urekar	4,433	7.33	-7.36	$29,801.14
New Democratic	Rehya Yazbek	4,398	7.28	-5.92	$9,127.01
Total valid votes/expense limit		60,451	100.00		$234,924.06
Total rejected ballots		232	0.38	–	
Turnout		60,683	65.63		
Eligible voters		92,461			
Conservative hold		Swing		-19.37	
Source: Elections Canada

2011 Canadian federal election: Dufferin—Caledon
Party	Candidate	Votes	%	±%	Expenditures
Conservative	David Tilson	28,647	59.00	+5.85	
Green	Ard Van Leeuwen	7,132	14.69	-2.11	
New Democratic	Leslie Parsons	6,409	13.20	+3.21	
Liberal	Bill Prout	6,361	13.10	-6.25	
Total valid votes		48,549	100.00		
Total rejected ballots		187	0.38	0.00	
Turnout		48,736	60.91	+3.20	
Eligible voters		80,019	–		
Conservative hold		Swing		+3.98	

2008 Canadian federal election: Dufferin—Caledon
Party	Candidate	Votes	%	±%	Expenditures
Conservative	David Tilson	23,363	53.21	+5.28	$61,440
Liberal	Rebecca Finch	8,495	19.35	-10.58	$18,089
Green	Ard Van Leeuwen	7,377	16.80	+6.80	$66,728
New Democratic	Jason Bissett	4,385	9.99	-2.14	
Canadian Action	Dean Woods	284	0.65	*	$384
Total valid votes/expense limit		43,904	100.00	$84,072	
Total rejected ballots		168	0.38		
Turnout		44,072	57.71		
Conservative hold		Swing		+7.93	

2006 Canadian federal election: Dufferin—Caledon
Party	Candidate	Votes	%	±%	Expenditures
Conservative	David Tilson	23,641	47.93	+1.01	$49,542
Liberal	Garry Moore	14,777	29.93	-12.82	$34,414
New Democratic	Chris Marquis	5,983	12.13	+2.88	$3,352
Green	Ted Alexander	4,912	10.00	+0.39	$10,218
Total valid votes/expense limit		49,313	100.00		
Total rejected ballots		166	0.34		
Turnout		49,479	64.94		
Conservative hold		Swing		+6.9	

2004 Canadian federal election: Dufferin—Caledon
Party	Candidate	Votes	%	±%	Expenditures
Conservative	David Tilson	19,270	42.81	-5.00	
Liberal	Murray Calder	17,557	39.00	-6.93	
Green	Ted Alexander	3,947	8.77	+5.53	
New Democratic	Rita Landry	3,798	8.44	+5.42	
Christian Heritage	Ursula Ellis	443	0.98	-	
Total valid votes/expense limit		45,015	100.00		
Conservative hold		Swing		+1.0	

Change is based on redistributed results from part of Dufferin—Peel—Wellington—Grey in the 2000 election. Conservative vote is compared to the total of the Canadian Alliance and Progressive Conservative votes.

=== Provincial ===
1999 Ontario general election: Dufferin—Peel—Wellington—Grey
Party	Candidate	Votes	%	±%
Progressive Conservative	David Tilson	30,532	64.76	–
Liberal	Steve White	13,591	28.83	–
New Democratic	Noel Duignan	1,871	3.97	–
Green	Richard Procter	1,156	2.45	–
Total valid votes		47,150	99.28	
Total rejected, unmarked and declined ballots		342	0.72	–
Turnout		47,492	58.62	–
Eligible voters		81,020		
Progressive Conservative notional hold		Swing		–
Source: Elections Ontario

1995 Ontario general election: Dufferin—Peel
Party	Candidate	Votes	%	±%
Progressive Conservative	David Tilson	23,239	66.00	+31.34
Liberal	Mavis Wilson	8,501	24.14	–8.70
New Democratic	Sandra A. Crane	3,470	9.86	–17.58
Total valid votes		35,210	99.42	
Total rejected, unmarked and declined ballots		204	0.58	–0.89
Turnout		35,414	65.37	–1.20
Eligible voters		54,176		
Progressive Conservative hold		Swing		+20.02
Source: Elections Ontario

1990 Ontario general election: Dufferin—Peel
Party	Candidate	Votes	%	±%
Progressive Conservative	David Tilson	10,899	34.66	+3.36
Liberal	Mavis Wilson	10,327	32.84	–20.22
New Democratic	Sandra A. Crane	8,627	27.43	+11.79
Libertarian	Bob Shapton	1,594	5.07	–
Total valid votes		31,447	98.53	
Total rejected, unmarked and declined ballots		469	1.47	+1.05
Turnout		31,916	66.56	+3.66
Eligible voters		47,948		
Progressive Conservative gain from Liberal		Swing		+11.79
Source: Elections Ontario
