= Brampton West—Mississauga =

Brampton West—Mississauga could refer to:

- Brampton West—Mississauga (federal electoral district)
- Brampton West—Mississauga (provincial electoral district)
