= Peel—Dufferin—Simcoe =

Former federal electoral district in Ontario, Canada

Ontario electoral district

Defunct federal electoral district
- Legislature: House of Commons
- District created: 1966
- District abolished: 1976
- First contested: 1968
- Last contested: 1974

Peel—Dufferin—Simcoe was a federal electoral district represented in the House of Commons of Canada from 1968 to 1979. It was located in the province of Ontario. This riding was created in 1966 from parts of Peel—Dufferin riding.

It consisted of the Townships of Mono and Mulmur in the County of Dufferin, the Townships of Albion, Caledon, Chinguacousy and Toronto Gore in the County of Peel, and, in the county of Simcoe, the Town of Alliston and the Townships of Adjala, Tosorontio and Essa (excluding the Village of Cookstown), and the Town of Orangeville.

The electoral district was abolished in 1976 when it was redistributed between Brampton—Halton Hills, Dufferin—Wellington, Simcoe South and York—Peel ridings.

== Members of Parliament ==
This riding has elected the following members of Parliament:

Parliament	Years	Member	Party
Riding created from Peel and Dufferin—Simcoe
28th	1968–1972	Bruce Beer	Liberal
29th	1972–1974	Ellwood Madill	Progressive Conservative
30th	1974–1979	Ross Milne	Liberal
Riding dissolved into Dufferin—Wellington, Simcoe South, York—Peel and Brampton—Georgetown

== Election results ==
1968 Canadian federal election: Peel—Dufferin—Simcoe
Party	Candidate	Votes
Liberal	Bruce Beer	18,950
Progressive Conservative	Ellwood Madill	14,138
New Democratic	George Hill	6,972

1972 Canadian federal election: Peel—Dufferin—Simcoe
Party	Candidate	Votes
Progressive Conservative	Ellwood Madill	25,663
Liberal	Ross Milne	20,759
New Democratic	Stewart Smith	9,061
Independent	Douglas Ross Swackhammer	482
Social Credit	Peter Clappison	205

1974 Canadian federal election: Peel—Dufferin—Simcoe
Party	Candidate	Votes
Liberal	Ross Milne	27,299
Progressive Conservative	Ellwood Madill	22,754
New Democratic	Don Fraser	8,264
Social Credit	Peter Clappison	271
Communist	Gord Massie	81
Marxist–Leninist	Paul Mackey	72

== See also ==
- List of Canadian electoral districts
- Historical federal electoral districts of Canada
