= Garth Turner =

Canadian businessman and politician (born 1949)

The Honourable Garth Turner PC
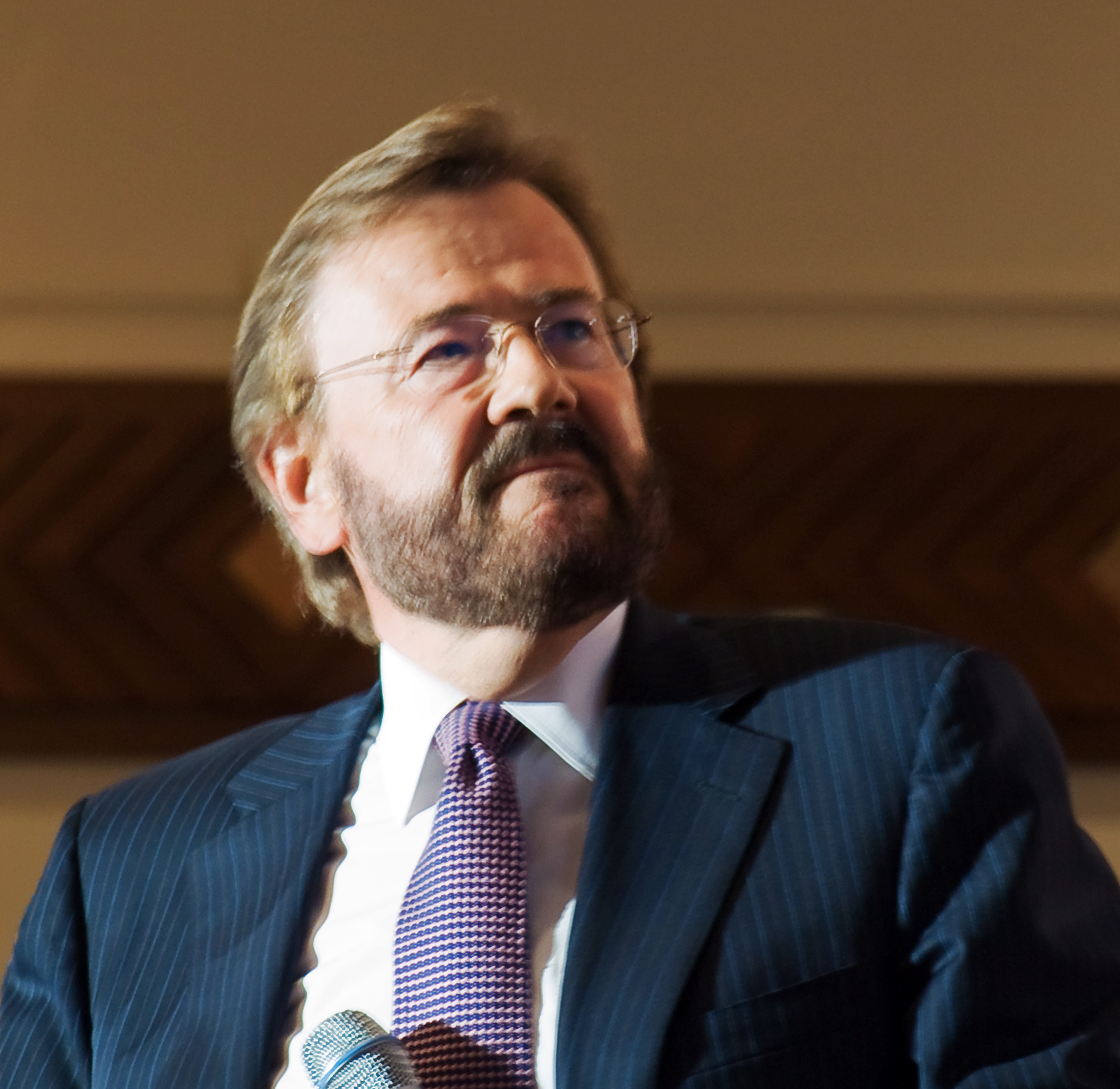
- Turner in Oakville, 2008

31st Minister of National Revenue
- In office June 25, 1993 – November 3, 1993
- Prime Minister: Kim Campbell
- Preceded by: Otto Jelinek
- Succeeded by: David Anderson

Member of Parliament for Halton (Halton—Peel; 1988–1993)
- In office January 23, 2006 – October 14, 2008
- Preceded by: Gary Carr
- Succeeded by: Lisa Raitt
- In office November 21, 1988 – October 25, 1993
- Preceded by: Riding established
- Succeeded by: Julian Reed

Personal details
- Born: John Garth Turner; March 14, 1949 (age 77) Woodstock, Ontario, Canada
- Party: Liberal (2007-present)
- Other political affiliations: Conservative (2005-6); Progressive Conservative (1988-1993)
- Spouse: Dorothy Turner
- Profession: Author, columnist, journalist, teacher, licensed financial advisor, blogger

John Garth Turner PC is a Canadian business journalist, author, entrepreneur, broadcaster, financial advisor, and politician, twice elected as a Member of the House of Commons, former Minister of National Revenue and leadership candidate for the Progressive Conservative Party of Canada. After serving as a PC MP between 1988 and 1993, he returned to political life as a candidate for the Conservative Party of Canada in the 2006 federal election, beating Liberal Gary Carr in the riding of Halton, Ontario. On October 18, 2006, the Conservative Party suspended him from the Conservative caucus for his independent stance, and he sat as an Independent MP until February 6, 2007, when he joined the Liberal Party of Canada. His great-grandfather, Ebenezer Vining Bodwell, was also a Liberal Member of Parliament.

== Early life and career ==
Turner was born on March 14, 1949, in Woodstock, Ontario.

He earned a Bachelor of Arts in English literature from the University of Toronto, and a Master of Arts in English literature from the University of Western Ontario. Turner claimed that, during his university years, he joined The Waffle group within the New Democratic Party.

Before entering a career in electoral politics Turner founded and owned weekly newspapers in Ontario. He also worked as an editor for The Globe and Mail, Metroland Publishing and Thomson Newspapers, and helped launch Maclean's as a newsweekly magazine. He was subsequently business editor of the Toronto Sun for ten years.

== Progressive Conservative MP ==
Turner was elected as the Progressive Conservative (PC) MP for Halton—Peel in the 1988 election. A Red Tory, he became chairman of the consumer and corporate affairs committee. He became a candidate for the leadership of the PC Party in 1993, placing fourth on the first ballot. In the short-lived cabinet of Kim Campbell he was appointed Minister of National Revenue, but lost his seat in the 1993 election when his party was reduced to just two seats.

== Financial commentator ==
After his election loss, Turner returned to journalism, becoming a business editor for Baton Broadcasting and then the CTV Television Network and authoring a series of books on real estate and personal finance. He became a popular public speaker on financial issues, syndicated newspaper columnist and radio broadcaster.

Also, during this period, Turner became a public speaker, traveling the country and attracting crowds at events often sponsored by financial advisory companies, banks, mutual fund companies and real estate investment companies. He also authored a string of bestsellers, including 2015: After the Boom, The Strategy, The Defence, 2020 and an annual RRSP guide.

Turner is the founder and former CEO of The Credit River Company, a Caledon-based destination and eco-tourism company that restored heritage buildings in the area. Turner served as national director of the Vancouver-based Sierra Legal Defence Fund, an organization dedicated to upholding environmental laws, resigning after his return to the House of Commons. His charity work included acting as a spokesperson for the Alzheimer Society of Canada.

In April 2008, Turner published Greater Fool, The Troubled Future of Real Estate, detailed Turner's view of the dangers confronting middle-class Canadians who reside in volatile urban real estate markets across the country. His subsequent book, After the Crash, which was published in early 2009, is an examination of the financial crisis gripping North America. In an article published in newspapers in December 2008, the Canadian Press called Greater Fool both "prescient" and "scarily bang-on." In February 2009, After the Crash became a national bestseller, according to the Globe and Mail and Booknet Canada. It concentrates on financial forecasting and strategies for the 2010–2015 period.

In 2009, Turner launched an online retail operation, xurbia.ca, offering renewable and alternative energy products and equipment, as well as preparedness supplies, citing climate change and the ongoing economic downturn as precipitating factors. He also relaunched his pre-election eco-tourism business with the purchase of the historic (1855) Cataract Inn, in Caledon, Ontario, outside of Toronto. Turner also returned to his national speaking tours, focusing on investor education in a string of events once again sponsored by prominent companies in the financial services sector.

== Conservative MP ==
Turner returned to politics with his election as a Conservative MP for Halton, which included most of the territory he had represented in his previous term, in the 2006 general election. Local political organizer Esther Shaye acted as his campaign manager.

Turner was very critical of former Liberal cabinet minister David Emerson's floor-crossing to the Conservatives. Turner called for Emerson to resign from Parliament and try to regain his seat in a by-election, saying that "anyone who crosses the floor ultimately should go back to the people for ratification and I stick by it and hopefully in this case that will happen...."

== Liberal MP ==
On October 18, 2006, the Ontario members of the Conservative caucus voted to suspend Turner for what they claimed were violations of caucus confidentiality as published in his weblog. Within hours, Turner was dismissed from the Conservative Party caucus, and ultimately from the Conservative Party of Canada, by edict of the party's political leadership. The Conservative Party never furnished evidence of Turner's alleged breaches of confidentiality, while Turner argued Prime Minister Stephen Harper could not tolerate an independent-minded MP within his caucus.

On October 19, 2006, the Toronto Star reported that Turner was being courted to become the first ever Green Party of Canada member of Parliament. Turner praised Green leader Elizabeth May on his blog and campaigned for her in her bid to win a seat in the London by-election. According to Turner's weblog, his constituents were consulted over a number of weeks, and various options for action were considered: that he remain an independent Member of Parliament with no party affiliation; that he reconcile with the Conservative party; or that he join the Green Party. After a period of introspection and deliberation, on February 6, 2007, Turner surprised many observers by joining the Liberal Party caucus at the invitation of its leader, Stéphane Dion.

The Conservative Party has criticized this decision as contrary to Turner's often-declared principle of electoral accountability to voters. In response, Turner repeatedly offered to run in a by-election in his constituency of Halton, Ontario, should David Emerson and Wajid Khan (floor-crossing members in the Conservative caucus, each former Liberals) also run in by-elections in their constituencies held at the same time.

In the 2008 federal election, Turner ran unsuccessfully for the Liberal Party in Halton, being defeated by Conservative Lisa Raitt.

In April 2009, Turner published the book, Sheeple: Caucus Confidential in Stephen Harper's Ottawa, through Key Porter Books. It is an account of his experiences within and without the caucus of the Conservative Party, and the clash between backroom-style politics and the open blogging Turner pioneered as a web-based MP.

In October 2009, Turner resigned his candidacy for the Liberal nomination in Dufferin—Caledon, stating that then-leader Michael Ignatieff's failure to allow a nomination meeting was a signal that his views are unwelcome.

== Financial advisor ==
Turner works as a financial lecturer and an independent, fee-based, licensed financial advisor based in both Toronto and Lunenburg, Nova Scotia. He is also a blogger, posting daily on economics and real estate at GreaterFool.ca. Throughout his work at GreaterFool.ca, he has been emphasizing the importance of allocating balanced investments in both real estate and financial markets.
