= Wellington—Grey =

Former federal electoral district in Ontario, Canada

Ontario electoral district

Defunct federal electoral district
- Legislature: House of Commons
- District created: 1966
- District abolished: 1976
- First contested: 1968
- Last contested: 1974

Wellington—Grey, renamed Wellington—Grey—Dufferin—Waterloo in 1970, was a federal electoral district represented in the House of Commons of Canada from 1968 to 1979. It was located in the province of Ontario. This riding was created in 1966 from parts of Dufferin—Simcoe, Grey—Bruce, Waterloo North, Wellington South and Wellington—Huron ridings.

Wellington—Grey consisted of:

- the Townships of Amarath, East Luther, Melancthon and East Garafraxa excepting the Town of Orangeville in the County of Dufferin,
- the Town of Durham and the Townships of Artemesia, Egremont, Glenelg, Normanby and Proton in the County of Grey,
- the Townships of Wellesley and Woolwich in the County of Waterloo,
- the Townships of Arthur, West Garafraxa, West Luther, Maryborough, Minto, Nichol, Peel and Pilkington in the County of Wellington, and
- the Town of Palmerston.

The electoral district was abolished in 1976 when it was redistributed between Bruce—Grey, Dufferin—Wellington, Grey—Simcoe, Guelph and Waterloo ridings.

== Members of Parliament ==
Parliament	Years	Member	Party
Wellington—Grey; Riding created from Dufferin—Simcoe, Grey—Bruce, Waterloo North, Wellington South and Wellington—Huron
28th	1968–1972	Marvin Howe	Progressive Conservative
Wellington—Grey—Dufferin—Waterloo
29th	1972–1974	Perrin Beatty	Progressive Conservative
30th	1974–1979	Perrin Beatty	Progressive Conservative
Riding dissolved into Bruce—Grey, Dufferin—Wellington, Grey—Simcoe, Guelph and Waterloo

== Electoral history ==
1968 Canadian federal election: Wellington—Grey
Party	Candidate	Votes	%	±%
Progressive Conservative	Marvin Howe	12,118		
Liberal	Jon Church	12,027		
New Democratic	Edward E. Seymour	2,902		
Independent	Melvin Francis Kienapple	224		

1972 Canadian federal election: Wellington—Grey—Dufferin—Waterloo
Party	Candidate	Votes	%	±%
Progressive Conservative	Perrin Beatty	17,080		
Liberal	Allan F. Ross	11,640		
New Democratic	Don Francis	4,846		

1974 Canadian federal election: Wellington—Grey—Dufferin—Waterloo
Party	Candidate	Votes	%	±%
Progressive Conservative	Perrin Beatty	17,253		
Liberal	Brian Kirkham	12,500		
New Democratic	Don Francis	4,297		

== See also ==
- List of Canadian electoral districts
- Historical federal electoral districts of Canada
