= York—Peel =

Former federal electoral district in Ontario, Canada

Ontario electoral district

Defunct federal electoral district
- Legislature: House of Commons
- District created: 1976
- District abolished: 1987
- First contested: 1979
- Last contested: 1984

York—Peel was a federal electoral district represented in the House of Commons of Canada from 1979 to 1988. It was located in the province of Ontario. This riding was created in 1976 from parts of Peel—Dufferin—Simcoe, York North and York—Simcoe ridings. It was represented in the House of Commons by Sinclair Stevens of the Progressive Conservative Party during its whole existence.

York—Peel consisted of the Town of Caledon in Peel Region, and the Townships of East Gwillimbury and King and the Towns of Aurora, Newmarket and Whitchurch–Stouffville in York Region.

The electoral district was abolished in 1987 when it was re-distributed between Halton—Peel, Markham, York North and York—Simcoe ridings.

== Members of Parliament ==
This riding has elected the following members of Parliament:

Parliament	Years	Member	Party
Riding created from Peel—Dufferin—Simcoe, York North and York—Simcoe
31st	1979–1980	Sinclair Stevens	Progressive Conservative
32nd	1980–1984	Sinclair Stevens	Progressive Conservative
33rd	1984–1988	Sinclair Stevens	Progressive Conservative
Riding dissolved into Halton—Peel, Markham, York North and York—Simcoe

== Election results ==
1979 Canadian federal election: York—Peel
Party	Candidate	Votes	%	±%
Progressive Conservative	Sinclair Stevens	29,081		
Liberal	Richard Whitehead	14,108		
New Democratic	Wally Gustar	7,725		
Libertarian	Wayne Kollinger	441		

1980 Canadian federal election: York—Peel
Party	Candidate	Votes	%	±%
Progressive Conservative	Sinclair Stevens	23,955		
Liberal	Wally Harkness	17,303		
New Democratic	John Hall	8,708		
Rhinoceros	Mark Oliver	589		
Libertarian	Garry Anstett	317		

1984 Canadian federal election: York—Peel
Party	Candidate	Votes	%	±%
Progressive Conservative	Sinclair Stevens	37,493		
Liberal	Pam McPherson	12,538		
New Democratic	John Hall	9,353		
Independent	Ray Pritchard	480		
Libertarian	Thomas Dreesen	437		

== See also ==
- List of Canadian electoral districts
- Historical federal electoral districts of Canada
