= Dufferin—Caledon (provincial electoral district) =

Provincial electoral district in Ontario, Canada

Coordinates: 44.0°N 80.1°W

Ontario electoral district
- Dufferin—Caledon in relation to other central Ontario electoral districts

Provincial electoral district
- Legislature: Legislative Assembly of Ontario
MPP
Sylvia Jones
Progressive Conservative
- District created: 2005
- First contested: 2007
- Last contested: 2025

Demographics
- Population (2016): 128,240
- Electors (2018): 99,913
- Area (km²): 2,197
- Pop. density (per km²): 58.4
- Census division(s): Dufferin County, Peel
- Census subdivision(s): Caledon, Orangeville, Mono, Shelburne, Amaranth, Mulmur, Melancthon, East Luther Grand Valley, East Garafraxa

Dufferin—Caledon is a provincial electoral district in southwestern Ontario, Canada. It was created for the 2007 provincial election. The entire riding was carved from Dufferin—Peel—Wellington—Grey, and includes all of Dufferin County plus the town of Caledon in Peel Region.

The riding also existed from 1987 until 1999 with the same borders, but was known as Dufferin—Peel.

== Members of Provincial Parliament ==
Assembly	Years	Member	Party
Dufferin—Peel; Riding created
34th	1987–1990	Mavis Wilson	Liberal
35th	1990–1995	David Tilson	Progressive Conservative
36th	1995–1999	David Tilson	Progressive Conservative
Riding dissolved
Dufferin—Caledon; Riding re-created from Dufferin—Peel—Wellington—Grey
39th	2007–2011	Sylvia Jones	Progressive Conservative
40th	2011–2014	Sylvia Jones	Progressive Conservative
41st	2014–2018	Sylvia Jones	Progressive Conservative
42nd	2018–2022	Sylvia Jones	Progressive Conservative
43rd	2022–2025	Sylvia Jones	Progressive Conservative
44th	2025–present	Sylvia Jones	Progressive Conservative

== Election results ==
Winning party in each polling division of Dufferin—Caledon at the 2025 Ontario general election

2025 Ontario general election
Party	Candidate	Votes	%	±%
Progressive Conservative	Sylvia Jones	26,072	52.49	+2.82
Liberal	Michael Dehn	12,606	25.38	+6.56
Green	Sandy Brown	6,157	12.39	–1.74
New Democratic	George Nakitsas	3,184	6.41	–4.36
New Blue	Kris Eggleton	1,074	2.16	–2.78
Independent	Jeffrey Halsall	384	0.77	–
Moderate	Alexey Cherkashov	197	0.40	+0.17
Total valid votes		49,674	99.43	
Total rejected, unmarked and declined ballots		284	0.57	+0.04
Turnout		49,958	42.79	+0.72
Eligible voters		116,755		
Progressive Conservative hold		Swing		–1.87
Source: Elections Ontario

Winning party in each polling division of Dufferin—Caledon at the 2022 Ontario general election

2022 Ontario general election
Party	Candidate	Votes	%	±%
Progressive Conservative	Sylvia Jones	22,911	49.67	–3.42
Liberal	Bob Gordanier	8,678	18.81	+6.35
Green	Laura Campbell	6,518	14.13	+1.60
New Democratic	Tess Prendergast	4,967	10.77	–9.57
New Blue	Andrea Banyai	2,280	4.94	–
Ontario Party	Lily Nguyen	589	1.28	–
Moderate	Erickumar Emmanuel	105	0.23	–
Public Benefit	Kay Sayer	79	0.17	–
Total valid votes		46,127	99.47	
Total rejected, unmarked and declined ballots		246	0.53	–0.46
Turnout		46,373	42.07	–14.50
Eligible voters		110,230		
Progressive Conservative hold		Swing		–4.88
Source: Elections Ontario

2018 Ontario general election
Party	Candidate	Votes	%	±%
Progressive Conservative	Sylvia Jones	29,704	53.08	+13.23
New Democratic	Andrea Mullarkey	11,381	20.34	+8.68
Green	Laura Campbell	7,011	12.53	–4.10
Liberal	Bob Gordanier	6,972	12.46	–18.20
Libertarian	Jeff Harris	430	0.77	–0.42
Consensus Ontario	Stephen McKendrick	301	0.54	–
Trillium	C. Andrew Nowell	157	0.28	–
Total valid votes		55,956	99.01	
Total rejected, unmarked and declined ballots		562	0.99	–0.37
Turnout		56,518	56.57	+5.09
Eligible voters		99,913		
Progressive Conservative hold		Swing		+2.27
Source: Elections Ontario

2014 Ontario general election
Party	Candidate	Votes	%	±%
Progressive Conservative	Sylvia Jones	18,017	39.86	–7.09
Liberal	Bobbie Daid	13,861	30.66	+3.91
Green	Karren Wallace	7,518	16.63	+2.05
New Democratic	Rehya Yazbek	5,269	11.66	+0.60
Libertarian	Daniel Kowalewski	538	1.19	+0.53
Total valid votes		45,203	98.63	
Total rejected, unmarked and declined ballots		627	1.37	+0.93
Turnout		45,830	51.48	+3.74
Eligible voters		89,024		
Progressive Conservative hold		Swing		–5.50
Source: Elections Ontario

2011 Ontario general election
Party	Candidate	Votes	%	±%
Progressive Conservative	Sylvia Jones	17,833	46.95	+5.10
Liberal	Lori Holloway	10,162	26.75	–5.26
Green	Robert Strang	5,540	14.58	–1.70
New Democratic	Karen Gventer	4,200	11.06	+1.20
Libertarian	Daniel Kowalewski	250	0.66	–
Total valid votes		37,985	99.56	
Total rejected, unmarked and declined ballots		166	0.44	–0.20
Turnout		38,151	47.74	–4.76
Eligible voters		79,918		
Progressive Conservative hold		Swing		+5.18
Source: Elections Ontario

2007 Ontario general election
Party	Candidate	Votes	%	±%
Progressive Conservative	Sylvia Jones	16,522	41.85	–22.93
Liberal	Betsy Hall	12,638	32.01	+3.19
Green	Robert Strang	6,430	16.29	+13.84
New Democratic	Lynda McDougall	3,893	9.86	+5.89
Total valid votes		39,483	99.36	
Total rejected, unmarked and declined ballots		254	0.64	–
Turnout		39,737	52.50	–
Eligible voters		75,695		
Progressive Conservative notional hold		Swing		–
Source: Elections Ontario

== Dufferin—Peel ==
1995 Ontario general election: Dufferin—Peel
Party	Candidate	Votes	%	±%
Progressive Conservative	David Tilson	23,239	66.00	+31.34
Liberal	Mavis Wilson	8,501	24.14	–8.70
New Democratic	Sandra A. Crane	3,470	9.86	–17.58
Total valid votes		35,210	99.42	
Total rejected, unmarked and declined ballots		204	0.58	–0.89
Turnout		35,414	65.37	–1.20
Eligible voters		54,176		
Progressive Conservative hold		Swing		+20.02
Source: Elections Ontario

1990 Ontario general election: Dufferin—Peel
Party	Candidate	Votes	%	±%
Progressive Conservative	David Tilson	10,899	34.66	+3.36
Liberal	Mavis Wilson	10,327	32.84	–20.22
New Democratic	Sandra A. Crane	8,627	27.43	+11.79
Libertarian	Bob Shapton	1,594	5.07	–
Total valid votes		31,447	98.53	
Total rejected, unmarked and declined ballots		469	1.47	+1.05
Turnout		31,916	66.56	+3.66
Eligible voters		47,948		
Progressive Conservative gain from Liberal		Swing		+11.79
Source: Elections Ontario

1987 Ontario general election: Dufferin—Peel
Party	Candidate	Votes	%	±%
Liberal	Mavis Wilson	14,231	53.06	–
Progressive Conservative	Charlie Bryan	8,393	31.29	–
New Democratic	Sandra A. Crane	4,195	15.64	–
Total valid votes		26,819	99.58	
Total rejected ballots		112	0.42	–
Turnout		26,931	62.91	–
Eligible voters		42,811		
Liberal pickup new district.				
Source: Elections Ontario

== 2007 electoral reform referendum ==
2007 Ontario electoral reform referendum
Side	Votes	%
First Past the Post	24,736	64.1
Mixed member proportional	13,867	35.9
Total valid votes	38,603	100.0

== See also ==
- List of Ontario provincial electoral districts
- Canadian provincial electoral districts
