= Bruce Beer =

Canadian politician (1910–1998)

Bruce Silas Beer BSA
- Official 1968 portrait

Member of Parliament for Peel—Dufferin—Simcoe
- In office June 25, 1968 – October 29, 1972
- Preceded by: Riding created
- Succeeded by: Ellwood Madill

Member of Parliament for Peel
- In office June 18, 1962 – June 24, 1968
- Preceded by: John Pallett
- Succeeded by: Riding dissolved

Personal details
- Born: Bruce Silas Beer; August 19, 1910 Bethany, Ontario, Canada
- Died: January 12, 1998 (aged 87) Wellington, Ontario, Canada
- Party: Liberal
- Spouse(s): Elsie Mae Currie (m. 1941; died 1991) Jean Howe
- Children: 3
- Education: Ontario Agricultural College
- Occupation: Farmer
- Portfolio: Parliamentary Secretary to the Minister of Agriculture (1963–1965 & 1966–1968); Parliamentary Secretary to the Minister of Forestry (1964–1965)

Bruce Silas Beer (August 19, 1910 – January 12, 1998) was a Canadian politician and farmer. He was elected to the House of Commons of Canada in the 1962 as a Member of the Liberal Party to represent the riding of Peel. He was re-elected in 1963, 1965 and for the riding of Peel—Dufferin—Simcoe in 1968. During his federal political career, he was Parliamentary Secretary to the Minister of Agriculture and Parliamentary Secretary to the Minister of Forestry. He was also a Member of the Commons Standing Committee on Agriculture.
