= Dufferin—Simcoe =

Former federal electoral district in Ontario, Canada

Ontario electoral district

Defunct federal electoral district
- Legislature: House of Commons
- District created: 1924
- District abolished: 1966
- First contested: 1925
- Last contested: 1965

Dufferin—Simcoe was a federal electoral district represented in the House of Commons of Canada from 1925 to 1968. It was located in the province of Ontario. This riding was created in 1924 from parts of Dufferin and Simcoe South ridings.

It initially consisted of the county of Dufferin and that part of the county of Simcoe lying south of and including the townships of Tossorontio, Essa and Innisfil. In 1933, it was redefined to exclude the townships of East Luther and East Garafraxa in the county of Dufferin, and no part of the town of Barrie.

In 1947, it was defined as consisting of the county of Dufferin, including the town of Orangeville, but excluding the townships of East Luther and East Garafraxa, and the part of the county of Simcoe lying south of and including the townships of Tosorontio, Essa and Innisfil, and excluding the town of Barrie.

In 1952, it was defined as consisting of the county of Dufferin and the town of Orangeville, and the part of the county of Simcoe lying south of and including the townships of Tosorontio, Essa and Innisfil (excluding the town of Barrie).

The electoral district was abolished in 1966 when it was redistributed between Peel—Dufferin, Simcoe North, Wellington—Grey and York—Simcoe ridings.

== Members of Parliament ==
This riding elected the following members of the House of Commons of Canada:

Parliament	Years	Member	Party
Riding created from Dufferin and Simcoe South
15th	1925–1926	William Earl Rowe	Conservative
16th	1926–1930	William Earl Rowe	Conservative
17th	1930–1935	William Earl Rowe	Conservative
18th	1935–1937	William Earl Rowe	Conservative
18th	1937–1940	William Earl Rowe	Conservative
19th	1940–1945	William Earl Rowe	National Government
20th	1945–1949	William Earl Rowe	Progressive Conservative
21st	1949–1953	William Earl Rowe	Progressive Conservative
22nd	1953–1957	William Earl Rowe	Progressive Conservative
23rd	1957–1958	William Earl Rowe	Progressive Conservative
24th	1958–1962	William Earl Rowe	Progressive Conservative
25th	1962–1963	William Earl Rowe	Progressive Conservative
26th	1963–1965	Ellwood Madill	Progressive Conservative
27th	1965–1968	Ellwood Madill	Progressive Conservative
Riding dissolved into Peel—Dufferin, Simcoe North, Wellington—Grey and York—Simcoe

== Election results ==
1925 Canadian federal election
Party	Candidate	Votes
Conservative	William Earl Rowe	8,942
Progressive	Robert John Wood	5,936

1926 Canadian federal election
Party	Candidate	Votes
Conservative	William Earl Rowe	8,376
Independent	Thomas Johnston O'Flynn	5,303

1930 Canadian federal election
Party	Candidate	Votes
Conservative	William Earl Rowe	9,369
Liberal	W. Garfield Case	4,388

1935 Canadian federal election
Party	Candidate	Votes
Conservative	William Earl Rowe	8,150
Liberal	William James Campbell Boake	4,767
Reconstruction	Allan Houghton Ferry	2,657

On Mr. Rowe's resignation when he accepted nomination for the Ontario Legislature at general election, 28 September 1937:

By-election on 8 November 1937
Party	Candidate	Votes
Conservative	William Earl Rowe	acclaimed

1940 Canadian federal election
Party	Candidate	Votes
National Government	William Earl Rowe	6,527
Liberal–Progressive	Andrew Parr Gilmore	4,226

1945 Canadian federal election
Party	Candidate	Votes
Progressive Conservative	William Earl Rowe	8,539
Independent	Murdock Charles MacKinnon	4,885

1949 Canadian federal election
Party	Candidate	Votes
Progressive Conservative	William Earl Rowe	7,639
Liberal	Richard McCulloch	5,720

1953 Canadian federal election
Party	Candidate	Votes
Progressive Conservative	William Earl Rowe	9,248
Liberal	Richard McCulloch	7,083

1957 Canadian federal election
Party	Candidate	Votes
Progressive Conservative	William Earl Rowe	11,852
Liberal	Burns Wales	6,290

1958 Canadian federal election
Party	Candidate	Votes
Progressive Conservative	William Earl Rowe	13,037
Liberal	John D. Bowerman	5,750

1962 Canadian federal election
Party	Candidate	Votes
Progressive Conservative	William Earl Rowe	10,533
Liberal	Harvey R. Stewart	7,526
Social Credit	Lloyd G. Cumming	1,547

1963 Canadian federal election
Party	Candidate	Votes
Progressive Conservative	Ellwood Madill	10,278
Liberal	Harvey Stewart	8,941
Social Credit	Lloyd G. Cumming	1,626
New Democratic	Derrick Manson	673

1965 Canadian federal election
Party	Candidate	Votes
Progressive Conservative	Ellwood Madill	9,701
Liberal	Harvey R. Stewart	6,420
New Democratic	George Hill	3,384
Social Credit	Lloyd G. Cumming	984

== See also ==
- List of Canadian electoral districts
- Historical federal electoral districts of Canada
