= William Earl Rowe =

Canadian politician (1894-1984)

The Honourable William Earl Rowe PC
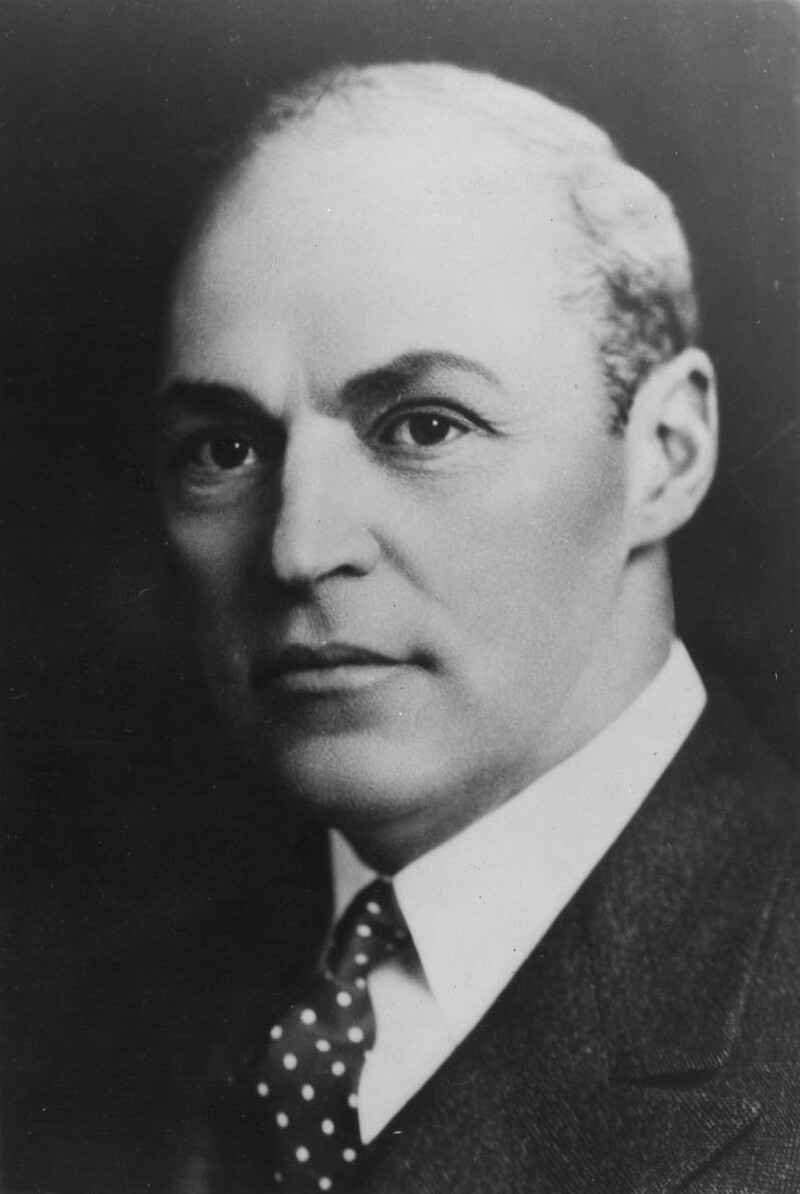
- Rowe, c. 1942

20th Lieutenant Governor of Ontario
- In office 1 May 1963 – 4 July 1968
- Monarch: Elizabeth II
- Governors General: Georges Vanier; Roland Michener
- Premier: John Robarts
- Preceded by: John Keiller MacKay
- Succeeded by: William Ross Macdonald

Leader of the Opposition
- In office 1 August 1956 – 13 December 1956
- Preceded by: George A. Drew
- Succeeded by: John Diefenbaker
- In office 1 November 1954 – 1 February 1955
- Preceded by: George A. Drew
- Succeeded by: George A. Drew

Interim Leader of the Progressive Conservative Party of Canada
- In office 21 September 1956 – 14 December 1956
- Preceded by: George A. Drew
- Succeeded by: John Diefenbaker

Member of Parliament for Dufferin—Simcoe
- In office 29 October 1925 – 8 April 1963
- Preceded by: Riding created
- Succeeded by: Ellwood Madill

Ontario MPP
- In office 25 June 1923 – 1 October 1925
- Preceded by: Edgar James Evans
- Succeeded by: Riding abolished
- Constituency: Simcoe South

Personal details
- Born: 13 May 1894 Hull, Iowa, U.S.
- Died: 9 February 1984 (aged 89) Newton Robinson, Ontario, Canada
- Party: Progressive Conservative
- Spouse: Treva Alda Lillian Lennox (m. 1917)
- Relations: Arza Clair Casselman (son-in law)
- Children: 4, including Jean
- Occupation: Farmer, Rancher

William Earl Rowe, PC (13 May 1894 – 9 February 1984), was a politician in Ontario, Canada. He served as the 20th Lieutenant Governor of Ontario from 1963 to 1968.

== Background ==
Rowe was born in Hull, Iowa, to Canadian parents in 1894. He moved to Ontario with his family at the age of two and grew up to become a farmer and cattle breeder. In 1917, he married Treva Alda Lillian Lennox. Together, they had four children, one of whom died during labour.

== Politics ==
He was reeve of the township of West Gwillimbury from 1919 to 1923. Rowe served as a Member of Provincial Parliament from 1923 to 1925, when elected to the House of Commons, where he served until 1935.

From 1936 to 1938, he was leader of Conservative Party of Ontario, but he did not have a seat in the legislature and so George S. Henry remained Leader of the Opposition.

In the public mind, the cause of labour was identified with the American Congress of Industrial Organizations and communism. During the 1937 provincial election, when Liberal premier Mitchell Hepburn was railing against the CIO's attempt to unionize General Motors and the supposed threat posed by organized labour, Rowe refused to take a stand against the CIO and repeatedly asserted that "the issue was not law and order but the right of free association." The Conservatives were then strongly associated with the Orange Order, which had long held a pro-labour position. Rowe's stance resulted in George A. Drew breaking with the party to run unsuccessfully as an "Independent Conservative" in the 1937 election in opposition to Rowe's position.

Rowe failed to win his seat in the 1937 provincial election but successfully ran in a by-election held in November 1937 to regain the seat in the federal House of Commons from which he had resigned two months earlier to run in the provincial election. He was succeeded as leader by his former rival, Drew. Drew went on to serve as Premier of Ontario in the 1940s before he moved to federal politics.

Rowe served in the House of Commons until 1962. On two occasions (1954–1955 and 1956) when Drew, who had by this point become federal PC leader, was unable to perform his duties because of ill health, Rowe served as acting leader of the official opposition. Following Drew's resignation in September 1956, Rowe took over as interim party leader until the 1956 Progressive Conservative leadership convention. He publicly remained neutral in the contest, though quietly supported Donald Fleming's ultimately unsuccessful campaign.

From 1958 to 1962, he and his daughter, Jean Casselman Wadds, were the only father and daughter to ever sit together in Parliament.

== Later life ==
Rowe was lieutenant governor of Ontario from 1963 to 1968. A champion and supporter of agriculture and rural affairs, particularly harness horse racing, he died in 1984 at Newton Robinson, Ontario.

== Legacy ==
The Honourable Earl Rowe Public School, in Bradford, Ontario, and Earl Rowe Provincial Park, near Alliston, are named in his honour.

Government offices
Preceded by John Keiller MacKay	Lieutenant Governor of Ontario; 1963–1968	Succeeded by William Ross Macdonald
