= Ellwood Madill =

Canadian politician

John Ellwood Madill
- Official 1973 portrait

Member of the Canadian Parliament for Dufferin—Simcoe
- In office April 1963 – June 1968
- Preceded by: William Earl Rowe
- Succeeded by: The electoral district was abolished in 1966.

Member of the Canadian Parliament for Peel—Dufferin—Simcoe
- In office October 1972 – May 1974
- Preceded by: Bruce Beer
- Succeeded by: William Ross Milne

Personal details
- Born: 15 January 1915 Melancthon, Ontario, Canada
- Died: 5 December 1999 (aged 84)
- Party: Progressive Conservative
- Spouse(s): Thelma Irene McGowan (m. 8 November 1941)
- Profession: businessman, farmer, insurance agent

John Ellwood Madill (15 January 1915 – 5 December 1999) was a Progressive Conservative party member of the House of Commons of Canada. He was born in Melancthon, Ontario.

From 1952 to 1957, he was a municipal councillor for Mono Township, subsequently its deputy reeve to 1959, then reeve from that point until 1963. In 1962, he was warden of Dufferin County.

Elwood Madill was an insurance agent in Orangeville, Ontario when he won the local Progressive Conservative nomination for the Dufferin—Simcoe riding on 16 February 1963. Madill won that seat in the federal election later that year. He was re-elected to a second term in 1965.

Due to riding boundary realignments in 1966, Madill campaigned in the newly formed Peel—Dufferin—Simcoe riding in the 1968 election but lost to Bruce Beer of the Liberal party. Beer only served one term in Parliament before Madill won back Peel—Dufferin—Simcoe in the 1972 federal election. However, after his term in the 29th Parliament, Madill left federal political office after his defeat to Ross Milne in the 1974 federal election.

Besides his insurance practice, Madill was also a businessman and farmer during his career.
