= Ross Milne (politician) =

Canadian politician

William Ross Milne

Member of the Canadian Parliament for Peel—Dufferin—Simcoe
- In office 1974–1979
- Preceded by: Ellwood Madill
- Succeeded by: District was abolished in 1976

Personal details
- Born: 27 August 1932 (age 94) Durham, Ontario, Canada
- Party: Liberal
- Spouse: Lorna Milne
- Children: Rob Milne, Jeanne Milne, Alec Milne
- Education: Ontario Agricultural College (Guelph University)
- Portfolio: Parliamentary Secretary to the Minister of Indian Affairs and Northern Development (1977-1978); Parliamentary Secretary to the Minister of Communications (1976-1977)

William Ross Milne better known as Ross Milne (born 27 August 1932) is a retired Canadian politician.

== Background ==
Milne, the son of Alex Milne and Eva Renton, was raised in a political family on a farm in Grey County, Ontario. Agnes Macphail, the first woman elected to Parliament in Canada was a cousin of his father's. At age 15 he got his driver's licence, bought a Model A Ford and won a school bus contract which he maintained through his high school years in Durham and Hanover.

Milne attended the University of Guelph (OAC) graduating first in Agricultural Engineering, and later with a master's degree in engineering. After graduation he worked with the Extension branch of the Ontario Ministry of Food and Agriculture designing farm buildings, drainage systems and conservation measures. He led in the design of buildings that made high density livestock and poultry housing feasible. These designs continue to be used in the livestock and poultry industries today.

His wife, Lorna Dennison Milne was appointed to the Senate of Canada in 1995 and served there until her retirement in 2009.

== Politics ==
Milne first ran for the Liberal Party of Canada in the 1972 federal election in the riding of Peel—Dufferin—Simcoe, west of Toronto. He was defeated by Progressive Conservative Ellwood Madill but prevailed in a rematch two years later in the 1974 federal election. In the House of Commons of Canada, Milne served as Parliamentary Secretary to the Minister of Communications from 1976 to 1977 and Parliamentary Secretary to the Minister of Indian Affairs and Northern Development from 1977 to 1978. He also served as chairman of the Ontario Liberal caucus. Milne advocated for gun control while an MP following a 1975 shooting rampage at Brampton Centennial High School, in Milne's riding, that left three dead and 13 injured.

As a result of redistribution, Milne ran for re-election in the new riding of Brampton—Georgetown in 1979, losing to John McDermid of the Tories. He ran again in the 1980 and 1984 federal elections but was bested by McDermid each time.

In 1980, Milne was elected president of the Ontario wing of the federal Liberal Party of Canada. In 1982, as Ontario party president, he cautioned Liberal Prime Minister Pierre Trudeau not to interpret a vote of confidence in his leadership from Ontario party members as a message urging him to stay in office. Milne was acclaimed to a third term as president of the Ontario wing of the federal party in 1983.

== Later life ==
After his defeat, Milne worked with TransCanada Pipelines where he established their Environmental Affairs Department, appeared many times before the National Energy Board and represented TCPL on the Canadian Petroleum Association's Environmental and Pipeline Committees.

In 1988 he was seconded by TCPL to the building of the 600 km Iroquois Pipeline from Cornwall, Ontario, through New York State and under Long Island Sound into New York City. He was the lead in obtaining the regulatory and environmental approvals, appearing before FERC (the US Regulatory Commission) and State agencies, and later overseeing the construction of the pipeline.

After returning to Canada in 1991 Milne joined Acres International, where he carried out energy-related projects for the World Bank in Russia, Colombia, Peru and Vietnam, and was a project leader for CIDA in providing institutional strengthening training for energy projects in South America.

After retiring, Milne returned to his agricultural engineering roots, designing and supervising the construction of all the buildings on the new Brampton Fall Fair site, for the Peel Agricultural Society in 1997. Since then, he has remained in charge of the operation, maintenance and proper inspection of all the operating systems for these buildings (i.e. the water supply, electrical, sewage and fire alarm systems).

He also has returned to touring in his Model As, and has driven with his wife in their 1931 Model A across Australia and New Zealand, through the Scandinavian countries, the Maritimes and up the West Coast of Canada through Alaska and the Yukon to the Arctic Circle. In 2013 he drove his Model A from Vancouver down to San Francisco, then across the US from the Golden Gate Bridge to Times Square in New York City, before driving it back home to Canada, 6,742 miles in total.
