= Brampton—Georgetown =

Former federal electoral district in Ontario, Canada

Ontario electoral district

Defunct federal electoral district
- Legislature: House of Commons
- District created: 1976
- District abolished: 1987
- First contested: 1979
- Last contested: 1984

Brampton–Georgetown (also known as Brampton–Halton Hills) was a federal electoral district in Ontario, Canada, that was represented in the House of Commons of Canada from 1979 to 1988.

The riding was represented from 1979 to 1988 by the Honourable John McDermid of the Progressive Conservative Party of Canada.

It was created as "Brampton–Halton Hills" riding in 1976 from parts of Halton, Mississauga and Peel—Dufferin—Simcoe ridings. It was renamed "Brampton–Georgetown" in 1977. It consisted of city of Brampton, and the northern part of the Town of Halton Hills.

The electoral district was abolished in 1987 when it was redistributed between Brampton and Halton—Peel ridings.

== Members of Parliament ==
Parliament	Years	Member	Party
Riding created from Halton, Mississauga and Peel—Dufferin—Simcoe
31st	1979–1980	John McDermid	Progressive Conservative
32nd	1980–1984	John McDermid	Progressive Conservative
33rd	1984–1988	John McDermid	Progressive Conservative
Riding dissolved into Brampton and Halton—Peel

== Election results ==
1979 Canadian federal election
Party	Candidate	Votes
Progressive Conservative	John McDermid	31,042
Liberal	Ross Milne	22,270
New Democratic	David Moulton	11,584
Libertarian	Joe Yundt	243
Communist	James Bridgewood	77
Marxist–Leninist	Marsha Fine	45

1980 Canadian federal election
Party	Candidate	Votes
Progressive Conservative	John McDermid	25,243
Liberal	Ross Milne	24,876
New Democratic	David Moulton	11,978
Libertarian	Joe Yundt	201
Communist	Jim Bridgewood	64
Marxist–Leninist	Marsha Fine	40

1984 Canadian federal election
Party	Candidate	Votes
Progressive Conservative	John McDermid	47,743
Liberal	Ross Milne	23,325
New Democratic	John Deamer	13,356
Green	Steven Kaasgaard	458
Communist	Jim Bridgewood	153

== See also ==
- List of Canadian electoral districts
- Historical federal electoral districts of Canada
