= Lorna Milne =

Canadian politician (1934–2023)

The Honourable Lorna Milne

Canadian Senator from Ontario
- In office 1995–2009
- Appointed by: Jean Chrétien

Personal details
- Born: Lorna Ann Dennison; 13 December 1934 Toronto, Ontario, Canada
- Died: 1 March 2023 (aged 88) Brampton, Ontario, Canada
- Party: Liberal
- Spouse: Ross Milne
- Children: 3
- Education: Ontario Agricultural College (Guelph University)
- Occupation: Political and community activist, academic
- Committees: Chair, Standing Committee on Legal and Constitutional Affairs (1997–2002); Chair, Standing Committee on Rules, Procedures and the Rights of Parliament (2004–2007)

Lorna Ann Milne (13 December 1934 – 1 March 2023) was a Canadian politician who served as a senator from 1995 to 2009.

== Early life and career ==
Milne was the daughter of former Mayor of Toronto and Co-operative Commonwealth Federation (CCF) Member of Provincial Parliament (MPP) William Dennison and granddaughter of Isaac Bainbridge, early labour organizer and pacifist. Her husband, William Ross Milne, served as a Liberal federal Member of Parliament in the 1970s, and is a cousin of the first female member of Parliament Agnes MacPhail.

After graduation, Milne lectured in the Department of Physics at the University of Guelph. In the 1960s, after moving to Brampton, she became a political and community activist, serving as a school trustee, first on the Brampton School Board (1964–68) and then as Vice Chair of the Peel County Board of Education (1964–72). She owned Flowertown Antiques (1972–89), featuring early Canadian pressed glass, a field in which she was a known expert.

Milne was involved in community activities and charitable organizations, serving as President of the North Peel unit of the Canadian Cancer Society in the 1980s and as residential coordinator for the Heart and Stroke Foundation of Ont. She also served on the Board of the Brampton YM-YWCA, the Brampton Caledon Community Living and as a Director of the Peel County Heritage Complex. In addition, she was a Board member of the Ontario Automobile Insurance Board. She served twice as a Census Commissioner for Statistics Canada (1971 and 1981).

Milne founded the Brampton and District University Women’s Club and served on the Senate of the University of Guelph (1981–85).

Milne had a passion for genealogy and researching family history. Over the years, she was involved with the Ontario Genealogical Society (OGS), and in 2002, she was named Hon. Patron of the Ontario Genealogical Society. Her other long-term hobby was collecting and researching early Canadian pressed glass. Over the years, she amassed a museum-worthy collection. She was recognized as an authority on Canadian pressed glass patterns and an active member of Glassfax.

== Senate career ==
In 1995, she was appointed to the Senate on the advice of Prime Minister Jean Chrétien. In the Senate, she served as chair of the Legal and Constitutional Affairs Committee, and waged a seven-year campaign from 1998 to 2005 to allow historical census data to be released to the public. It culminated when Bill S-18 was passed, ensuring that all censuses conducted until 2001 would be released after 92 years, and all subsequent censuses starting with the 2006 census would allow Canadians the option to decide whether or not their information would be released. She also served as Chair of Committee on Rules, Procedures and the Rights of Parliament when it successfully recommended creation of the position of Senate Ethics Officer. She was also responsible for the legalization of hemp as an agricultural crop in 1999.

Milne served as Senate Vice-Chair of the National Liberal Caucus from 2006–2009 and also was President of the Canada-Europe Parliamentary Association from 2004-2008.

In 2009, Lorna Milne retired from the Senate upon reaching the mandatory retirement age of 75.

== Later life and death ==
In 2015, Milne donated 50 acres of the treed forest she and her dad planted in her youth. That land will be forever a protected forest and wetland area just outside Caledon East. As a consequence, Milne was awarded the Charles Sauriol Leadership Award by the Toronto and Region Conservation Authority.

After her retirement, Milne devoted her time to researching the Dennison, Bainbridge and Milne family genealogy, caring for her grandchildren, and spending time at her cottage on Kasshabog Lake. She died on 1 March 2023, at the age of 88.

== See also ==
- List of Ontario senators
