= Mavis Wilson =

Canadian politician

The Honourable Mavis Wilson ECO

Ontario MPP
- In office 1987–1990
- Preceded by: New riding
- Succeeded by: David Tilson
- Constituency: Dufferin—Peel

Personal details
- Born: 1949 (age 76–77)
- Party: Liberal
- Spouse: Bruce Wilson
- Children: 3
- Profession: Farmer

Mavis Wilson (born c. 1949) is a former politician in Ontario, Canada. She was a Liberal member of the Legislative Assembly of Ontario from 1987 to 1990 who represented the riding of Dufferin—Peel. She served as a cabinet minister in the government of David Peterson.

== Background ==
Wilson and her husband Bruce manage a potato farm in the Orangeville, Ontario region. Together they raised three children Vanessa Wilson, Taylor Wilson and Hunter Wilson.

== Politics ==
Wilson began her political career as a school trustee, served on the Dufferin County Board of Education for eleven years (including three as chair).

She was elected to the Ontario legislature in the 1987 provincial election, defeating her Progressive Conservative opponent by almost 6,000 votes in the riding of Dufferin—Peel. David Peterson's Liberals won a landslide majority in this election, and Wilson was appointed as a Minister without Portfolio responsible for Senior Citizen's Affairs on September 10, 1987. On August 2, 1989, she was appointed Minister responsible for Women's Issues, a post she held until her defeat in the September 1990 election.

The Liberals were defeated by the New Democratic Party in the 1990 provincial election. Wilson lost her seat by 572 votes to David Tilson of the Progressive Conservative Party of Ontario. She attempted to regain the seat in the 1995 provincial election, but lost by almost 15,000 votes amid a Progressive Conservative majority government victory.

=== Cabinet positions ===
Peterson ministry, Province of Ontario (1985–1990)
Special Cabinet Responsibilities
| Predecessor | Title | Successor |
| Greg Sorbara | Minister Without Portfolio; 1989–1990; Responsible for Women's Issues | Anne Swarbrick |
| Ron Van Horne | Minister Without Portfolio; 1987–1989; Responsible for the Senior Citizens | Gilles Morin |
