= Murray Calder =

Canadian politician

Murray Calder (born 15 January 1951) was a Liberal member of the House of Commons of Canada from 1993 to 2004. He is a farmer by profession.

Born in Mount Forest, Ontario, Calder first became a Liberal candidate in 1988, unsuccessfully contesting the Wellington—Grey—Dufferin—Simcoe electoral district. His second attempt in the 1993 election was successful, defeating Progressive Conservative cabinet minister Perrin Beatty, making him a member of the 35th Canadian Parliament. He won in the 1997 and 2000 national elections in the redistributed Dufferin—Peel—Wellington—Grey riding. He held various committee posts during his terms of office, mostly relating to agriculture. In 2003 he served as Parliamentary Secretary to International Trade Minister Pierre Pettigrew and sat on the House of Commons Standing Committee on Foreign Affairs. From 2001 to 2003 he served as Chair of National Liberal Rural Caucus.

He teamed up with Progressive Conservative Senator Lowell Murray to pass a bill in 2002 to designate the Canadian Horse as Canada's national horse. Calder also worked to obtain changes in federal tax laws to benefit fire fighters, including a change allowing them to accrue pensions at a higher rate so they could retire early with a full pension. He worked with Senator Lorna Milne to campaign for public access to post 1901 Canada Census data, an issue of special interest to genealogists.

Before the 2004 election, the electoral districts were again rearranged and Calder contested the new Dufferin—Caledon riding. He was defeated by Conservative candidate David Tilson.

Calder has restored a number of old military vehicles as a hobby on his chicken farm in Holstein, Ontario. Until 2006, he had a pet Bactrian camel, Baxter, who drank beer.

== Electoral record ==
2004 Canadian federal election: Dufferin—Caledon
Party	Candidate	Votes	%	±%	Expenditures
Conservative	David Tilson	19,270	42.81	-5.00	
Liberal	Murray Calder	17,557	39.00	-6.93	
Green	Ted Alexander	3,947	8.77	+5.53	
New Democratic	Rita Landry	3,798	8.44	+5.42	
Christian Heritage	Ursula Ellis	443	0.98	-	
Total valid votes/expense limit		45,015	100.00		
Conservative hold		Swing		+1.0	

Change is based on redistributed results from part of Dufferin—Peel—Wellington—Grey in the 2000 election. Conservative vote is compared to the total of the Canadian Alliance and Progressive Conservative votes.

Parliament of Canada
Preceded by Perrin Beatty	Member of Parliament for Wellington—Grey—Dufferin—Simcoe; 1993–1997	Succeeded by Riding Abolished
Preceded by Riding Created	Member of Parliament for Dufferin—Peel—Wellington—Grey; 1997–2004	Succeeded by Riding Abolished
