= Sinclair Stevens =

Canadian politician

The Honourable Sinclair Stevens PC
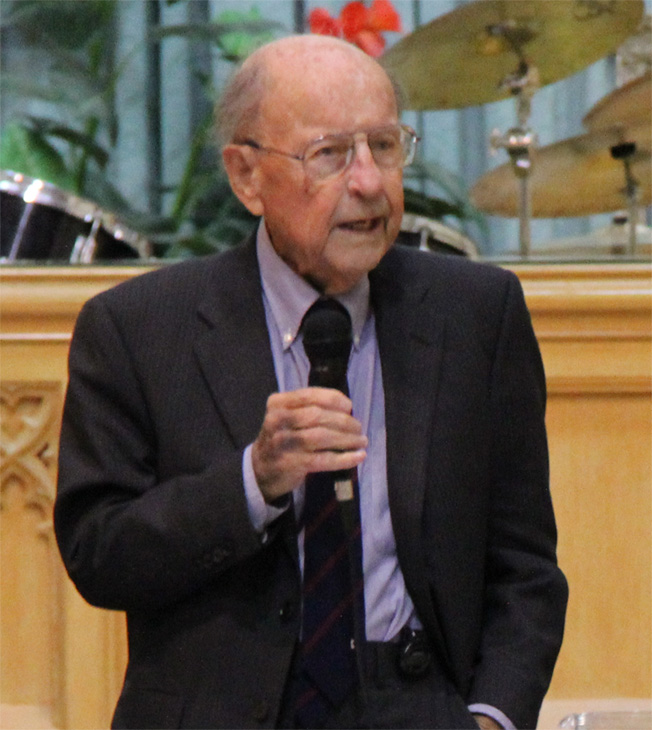
- Stevens in 2013

Leader of the Progressive Canadian Party
- In office December 1, 2007 – November 30, 2016
- Preceded by: Tracy Parsons
- Succeeded by: Joe Hueglin (interim)

President of the Treasury Board
- In office June 4, 1979 – March 2, 1980
- Prime Minister: Joe Clark
- Preceded by: Judd Buchanan
- Succeeded by: Donald Johnston

Member of Parliament for York—Peel
- In office May 22, 1979 – November 20, 1988
- Preceded by: Riding established
- Succeeded by: Riding dissolved

Member of Parliament for York—Simcoe
- In office October 30, 1972 – May 21, 1979
- Preceded by: John Roberts
- Succeeded by: Riding dissolved

Personal details
- Born: Sinclair McKnight Stevens; February 11, 1927 Esquesing Township, Ontario, Canada
- Died: November 30, 2016 (aged 89) King Township, Ontario, Canada
- Party: Progressive Canadian Party
- Other political affiliations: Progressive Conservative (until 2003)
- Spouse: Noreen Mary Terese Charlebois (m. 1958)
- Profession: Businessman, politician, lawyer

Sinclair McKnight Stevens PC (February 11, 1927 – November 30, 2016) was a Canadian lawyer, businessman and cabinet minister in the government of Joe Clark.

== Early life ==
He was born in Esquesing Township (today part of Halton Hills, Ontario), the third child of Northern Irish immigrants Robert Murray Stevens and Anna Bailey McKnight. The family later moved near Kleinburg, Ontario.

He attended Weston Collegiate Institute and later, the University of Western Ontario, class of 1950. He was active in the student newspaper and the model Parliament. He entered Osgoode Hall Law School, where he met his fellow student and future wife Noreen Mary Terese Charlebois. Noreen was one of just five women in their class. They graduated in 1955 and married in 1958. From his university days until he articled, he was a part-time reporter for the Toronto Star. Stevens articled with Toronto law firm Fraser & Beatty. He later formed his own firm Stevens, Hassard & Elliot.

== Early career ==
In 1958, his first development, The Cardiff, was under way. That was followed up with several other development projects.

In 1962, he formed York Trust and Savings Co. Former Bank of Canada Governor James Coyne became chairman in 1963. Stevens had interests in several other small trust companies. Unusually for the time, his branches were located in working-class areas and Loblaws stores, featuring extended service hours. York Trust grew at four times the rate of other trust companies.

By 1964 Stevens controlled 23 companies with assets of $130 million, having started in 1961 with just $215,000.

From 1963 to 1967 Stevens, was embroiled in an attempt to form the first new Canadian chartered bank in 50 years, Westbank. That caused resentment in several quarters. Westerners saw it as yet another eastern-controlled firm, Conservatives were put off by the association with Coyne, and the feathers of the establishment banks were ruffled. The affair led to a falling-out with Coyne and later with businessman Marc Bienvenu. John Diefenbaker reportedly "loathed" Stevens over the issue.

== Member of Parliament ==
In 1968, he moved to King Township, Ontario. He was first elected to the House of Commons of Canada in the 1972 federal election as a Progressive Conservative Member of Parliament, defeating Liberal incumbent cabinet minister John Roberts in the riding of York—Simcoe. He was re-elected in 1974. When his riding was abolished in 1979, Stevens was nominated in the new riding of York—Peel. He won again, and was re-elected in 1980, and 1984.

== Bid for PC leadership 1976 ==
Stevens ran as a candidate in the 1976 Progressive Conservative leadership convention. At the time, he had only three years parliamentary experience, but five of the other candidates had also entered parliament in 1972. He finished seventh (of eleven candidates) on the first ballot and withdrew in favour of the eventual winner Joe Clark. That was seen as a surprising move, since Stevens was considered right-wing, and Clark was a moderate on the party's left wing. Mulroney would "think about Steven's dramatic walk for years to come, never pretending to understand it."

Stevens had been the top official campaign spender (at $294,107), but Mulroney, who did not provide figures, is widely thought to have exceeded that amount.

== Cabinet minister (1979–1980, 1984–1986) ==
Stevens served as President of the Treasury Board in the short-lived (1979–1980) Clark government.

Stevens turned against Clark, and was an early supporter of Mulroney's leadership bid which culminated in victory at the 1983 Progressive Conservative leadership convention. After the 1984 election, which resulted in a Tory landslide, Stevens became Minister of Regional Industrial Expansion.

== Conflict of interest allegations and Parker Commission ==
As a cabinet minister, Stevens had placed his business holdings into a blind trust. He was forced to resign from Cabinet in 1986 after allegations of conflict of interest.

In December 1987, a special commission of inquiry, headed by Justice William Dickens Parker, ruled Stevens had violated conflict-of-interest allegations on fourteen counts. David Scott, brother of Ian Scott, as well as Marlys Edwardh were prominent lawyers involved in the commission, which cost more than $2.9 million. Edwardh had studied search and seizure, and the Parker commission was one of the first to make extensive use of subpoena. John Sopinka represented Stevens, and Ian Binnie represented Canada. The session lasted eight months, 93 witnesses were called, and nearly 14,000 pages of transcripts were recorded. Scott's summation ran to 795 pages, Sopinka's 346 pages.

Despite the controversy, Stevens was allowed to remain in the Progressive Conservative caucus as a backbencher for the remainder of his term, after which his riding was abolished and the constituency of York—Simcoe re-established. Stevens won the PC nomination in his original riding once again but Prime Minister Mulroney refused to sign his nomination papers, forcing the riding association to nominate another candidate. As a result of the bitter fight, Stevens left Parliament in 1988.

In December 2004, Federal Court Judge John O'Keefe declared null and void the findings of the Parker Inquiry. The court ruled that Parker's definition of conflict of interest exceeded that of the guidelines governing ministers in the Mulroney Cabinet and that the step exceeded Parker's mandate.

In voiding the definition of conflict of interest, the judge found that Stevens's behaviour did not violate the guidelines that governed him since no valid guidelines had existed.

== Later life ==
Stevens returned to prominence as a bitter opponent of the merger of the Canadian Alliance and the Progressive Conservatives into the Conservative Party of Canada. Stevens launched an unsuccessful lawsuit to try to block the merger. He later became a prominent member of the Progressive Canadian Party, which had been formed by Progressive Conservative members disaffected by the merger. In 2007, after Tracy Parsons's resignation as leader of the "new" PC Party, Stevens succeeded Parsons as interim leader. Stevens remained in that position until his death, nine years later.
