= COVID-19 Supply Council =

Effort of the Government of Canada

The Canadian COVID-19 Supply Council (CCSC) is an effort of the Government of Canada to advise it "on the procurement of critical goods and services required as part of Canada's response to and recovery from the COVID-19 pandemic." Minister of Supply and Services Anita Anand announced on 4 May 2020 an effort to supervise "existing supply chains for items like masks, gloves and disinfectants, ...[and to] improve sourcing, production, shipping and distribution strategies for those goods." Anand announced 17 councillors, including Perrin Beatty, head of the Canadian Chamber of Commerce and other chiefs of industry groups and charitable organizations.
