= Wellington—Huron =

Former federal electoral district in Ontario, Canada

Ontario electoral district

Defunct federal electoral district
- Legislature: House of Commons
- District created: 1952
- District abolished: 1966
- First contested: 1953
- Last contested: 1965

Wellington—Huron was a federal electoral district represented in the House of Commons of Canada from 1953 to 1968. It was located in the province of Ontario. This riding was created in 1952 from parts of Huron North, Wellington North and Wellington South ridings.

Wellington—Huron consisted of the townships of Arthur, Garafraxa West, Maryborough, Minto, Nichol, Peel and West Luther, including the towns of Mount Forest and Palmerston in the county of Wellington, and the townships of Howick, Turnberry, and the town of Wingham the county of Huron.

The electoral district was abolished in 1966 when it was redistributed between Huron and Wellington—Grey ridings.

== Members of Parliament ==
This riding elected the following members of the House of Commons of Canada:

Parliament	Years	Member	Party
Riding created from Huron North, Wellington North and Wellington South
22nd	1953–1957	Marvin Howe	Progressive Conservative
23rd	1957–1958	Marvin Howe	Progressive Conservative
24th	1958–1962	Marvin Howe	Progressive Conservative
25th	1962–1963	Marvin Howe	Progressive Conservative
26th	1963–1965	Marvin Howe	Progressive Conservative
27th	1965–1968	Marvin Howe	Progressive Conservative
Riding dissolved into Huron and Wellington—Grey

== Election results ==
1953 Canadian federal election: Wellington—Huron
Party	Candidate	Votes	%	±%
Progressive Conservative	Marvin Howe	7,198		
Liberal	Arnold Darroch	7,120		

1957 Canadian federal election: Wellington—Huron
Party	Candidate	Votes	%	±%
Progressive Conservative	Marvin Howe	9,421		
Liberal	Arnold Darroch	5,741		

1958 Canadian federal election: Wellington—Huron
Party	Candidate	Votes	%	±%
Progressive Conservative	Marvin Howe	10,574		
Liberal	Ross McLellan	4,963		

1962 Canadian federal election: Wellington—Huron
Party	Candidate	Votes	%	±%
Progressive Conservative	Marvin Howe	7,455		
Liberal	Fred G. Beck	5,344		
New Democratic	H. Gordon Green	2,616		

1963 Canadian federal election: Wellington—Huron
Party	Candidate	Votes	%	±%
Progressive Conservative	Marvin Howe	8,391		
Liberal	Bill Tilden	5,809		
New Democratic	Oliver Mabee	1,152		

1965 Canadian federal election: Wellington—Huron
Party	Candidate	Votes	%	±%
Progressive Conservative	Marvin Howe	7,792		
Liberal	H. Gordon Green	5,385		
New Democratic	John R. MacLeod	1,304		

== See also ==
- List of Canadian electoral districts
- Historical federal electoral districts of Canada
