= Colleen Beaumier =

Canadian politician (born 1944)

Member of Parliament for Brampton
- In office 1993–1997
- Preceded by: John McDermid
- Succeeded by: Riding dissolved

Member of Parliament for Brampton West-Mississauga
- In office 1997–2004
- Preceded by: Riding established
- Succeeded by: Riding dissolved

Member of Parliament for Brampton West
- In office 2004–2008
- Preceded by: Riding established
- Succeeded by: Andrew Kania

Personal details
- Born: November 8, 1944 (age 82) Chatham, Ontario
- Died: October 21, 2026 Chatham, Ontario
- Party: Liberal
- Spouse: Pierre Beaumier
- Profession: Businesswoman

Colleen Beaumier (born November 8, 1944) is a Canadian politician, who served in the House of Commons of Canada as a Liberal Member of Parliament from 1993 to 2008.

== Pre-politics ==
Born in Chatham, Ontario, she studied at the University of Windsor, earning a bachelor of arts in psychology. She and her husband Pierre are the parents of three adult children: Stephanie, Michael and John; Stephanie ran for Brampton City Council in the 2006 election but was defeated.

Before enter politics, she taught at the Ontario School for Mentally Challenged Children, served as a community member of the Ontario Parole Board, worked as a controller at a trucking firm and, at the time of her election, she was the vice-president of a bioanalytical services firm employing more than 100 people. Her involvement in international human rights began in 1980. As area co-ordinator of Operation Lifeline, she assisted Vietnamese refugees settling in the Toronto area.

== Political career ==
Beaumier was first elected in 1993 in the riding of Brampton. In 1997, she was re-elected, this time in the newly created riding of Brampton West—Mississauga, where she won again on November 27, 2000. During the federal election of 2004, she defeated former provincial Minister of Health Tony Clement in the newly created riding of Brampton West. In 2006, she was again re-elected, her fifth such mandate.

As a Member of Parliament, she has remained a frequent spokesperson for human rights. At the 1995 global conference on the Inter-Parliamentary Union at the United Nations, she spoke on the dangers of global income disparities. In response to human rights violations uncovered during the Somali Inquiry, she authored a private member's bill, Bill C-208, which increased transparency in the bureaucracy and established tougher penalties for the destruction of documents.

Beaumier served on numerous parliamentary committees, most notably serving as chair of the Subcommittee on Human Rights and International Development and the Subcommittee on Veterans Affairs. She also served as vice-chair of Standing Committee on Foreign Affairs and International Trade. In 2003, she served as parliamentary secretary to the Minister of National Revenue and later as the associate critic for the Canada Border Services Agency.

She announced on September 5, 2008 that she would not be running in the 2008 election. She was succeeded by Andrew Kania.

== Electoral record ==
2006 Canadian federal election: Brampton West
| Party | Candidate | Votes | % | ±% |
|---|---|---|---|---|
| Liberal | Colleen Beaumier | 27,988 | 49.1 | +4.7 |
| Conservative | Bal Gosal | 20,345 | 35.7 | -4.3 |
| New Democratic | Jagtar Singh Shergill | 6,310 | 11.1 | +0.6 |
| Green | Jaipaul Massey-Singh | 2,340 | 4.1 | +0.7 |
| Total valid votes | | 56,983 | 100.0 | |

2004 Canadian federal election: Brampton West
| Party | Candidate | Votes | % |
|---|---|---|---|
| Liberal | Colleen Beaumier | 21,254 | 45.4 |
| Conservative | Tony Clement | 18,768 | 40.0 |
| New Democratic | Chris Moise | 4,920 | 10.5 |
| Green | Sanjeev Goel | 1,603 | 3.4 |
| Independent | Tom Bose | 371 | 0.8 |
| Total valid votes | | 46,916 | 100.0 |

2000 Canadian federal election
| Party | Candidate | Votes |
|---|---|---|
| Liberal | Colleen Beaumier | 31,041 |
| Alliance | Hardial Sangha | 7,666 |
| Progressive Conservative | Glenn W. Harewood | 5,957 |
| New Democratic | Matt Harsant | 1,567 |
| Green | Mike Hofer | 529 |

1997 Canadian federal election
| Party | Candidate | Votes |
|---|---|---|
| Liberal | Colleen Beaumier | 27,297 |
| Progressive Conservative | Robertson, Kirk | 8,447 |
| Reform | Ernie Mcdonald | 7,569 |
| New Democratic | Nirmal Dhinsa | 2,192 |

1993 Canadian federal election
| Party | Candidate | Votes |
|---|---|---|
| Liberal | Colleen Beaumier | 35,203 |
| Reform | Ernie Mcdonald | 18,196 |
| Progressive Conservative | Susan Fennell | 12,134 |
| New Democratic | John Morris | 1,925 |
| Natural Law | Maxim Newby | 455 |
| Marxist–Leninist | Amarjit Dhillon | 245 |
