= Wellington—Dufferin—Simcoe =

Former federal electoral district in Ontario, Canada

Ontario electoral district

Defunct federal electoral district
- Legislature: House of Commons
- District created: 1976
- District abolished: 1987
- First contested: 1979
- Last contested: 1984

Wellington—Dufferin—Simcoe was a federal electoral district represented in the House of Commons of Canada from 1979 to 1988. It was located in the province of Ontario. This riding was created in 1976 as Dufferin—Wellington and renamed in 1977. It was created from parts of Halton, Peel—Dufferin—Simcoe and Wellington—Grey—Dufferin—Waterloo ridings.

It consisted of the County of Dufferin, the Townships of Adjala and Tosorontio and the Town of Alliston in the County of Simcoe, and Townships of Arthur, Erin, Maryborough, Minto, Nichol, Peel, West Garafraxa and West Luther, including the Towns of Mount Forest and Palmerston in the County of Wellington.

The electoral district was abolished in 1987 when it was redistributed between Guelph—Wellington, Perth—Wellington—Waterloo, Simcoe Centre, Wellington—Grey—Dufferin—Simcoe and York—Simcoe ridings.

== Members of Parliament ==
This riding has elected the following members of Parliament:

Parliament	Years	Member	Party
Riding created from Halton, Peel—Dufferin—Simcoe, and Wellington—Grey—Dufferin—Waterloo
31st	1979–1980	Perrin Beatty	Progressive Conservative
32nd	1980–1984	Perrin Beatty	Progressive Conservative
33rd	1984–1988	Perrin Beatty	Progressive Conservative
Riding dissolved into Guelph—Wellington, Perth—Wellington—Waterloo, Simcoe Centre, Wellington—Grey—Dufferin—Simcoe and York—Simcoe

== Election results ==
1979 Canadian federal election: Wellington—Dufferin—Simcoe
Party	Candidate	Votes	%	±%
Progressive Conservative	Perrin Beatty	25,807		
Liberal	Harry A. Greene	11,202		
New Democratic	Jeff Koechlin	4,744		

1980 Canadian federal election: Wellington—Dufferin—Simcoe
Party	Candidate	Votes	%	±%
Progressive Conservative	Perrin Beatty	21,205		
Liberal	Larry Davies	12,104		
New Democratic	Cecil Chambers	5,966		
Libertarian	Norma Watson	162		

1984 Canadian federal election: Wellington—Dufferin—Simcoe
Party	Candidate	Votes	%	±%
Progressive Conservative	Perrin Beatty	29,983		
Liberal	John Green	7,303		
New Democratic	Sandy W. A. Young	6,468		

== See also ==
- List of Canadian electoral districts
- Historical federal electoral districts of Canada
