= Halton—Peel =

Former federal electoral district in Ontario, Canada

Ontario electoral district

Defunct federal electoral district
- Legislature: House of Commons
- District created: 1987
- District abolished: 1996
- First contested: 1988
- Last contested: 1993

Halton—Peel was a federal electoral district represented in the House of Commons of Canada from 1988 to 1997. It was located in the province of Ontario. This riding was created in 1987 from parts of Brampton—Georgetown, Halton and York—Peel ridings.

It consisted of the northern part of the City of Burlington, the Town of Halton Hills, the part of the Town of Milton lying between Tremaine Road and the Macdonald-Cartier Freeway, and the Town of Caledon.

The electoral district was abolished in 1996 when it was re-distributed between Burlington, Dufferin—Peel—Wellington—Grey, and Halton ridings.

== Members of Parliament ==
Halton—Peel
Parliament	Years	Member	Party
Riding created from Brampton—Georgetown, Halton and York—Peel
34th	1988–1993	Garth Turner	Progressive Conservative
35th	1993–1997	Julian Reed	Liberal
Riding dissolved into Burlington, Dufferin—Peel—Wellington—Grey, and Halton

== Electoral history ==
1988 Canadian federal election
Party	Candidate	Votes	%
Progressive Conservative	Garth Turner	28,521	51.02
Liberal	Pierre Klein	16,486	31.57
New Democratic	Fern Wolf	6,767	12.96
Libertarian	George Panagapka	449	0.86
Total valid votes		52,223	100.00
Source(s) "Halton--Peel, Ontario". History of Federal Ridings since 1867. Library of Parliament.

1993 Canadian federal election
Party	Candidate	Votes	%	±%
Liberal	Julian Reed	22,278	37.00	+5.43
Progressive Conservative	Garth Turner	18,350	30.48	-20.54
Reform	Dick MacDuffee	16,826	27.95	–
New Democratic	Norma Peterson	1,458	2.42	-10.54
National	Brian Patriquin	564	0.94	–
Libertarian	Hill Cox	420	0.70	-0.16
Christian Heritage	Marc Bianco	307	0.51	–
Total valid votes		60,203	100.00	
Liberal gain from Progressive Conservative		Swing		+12.99
Source(s) "Halton--Peel, Ontario". History of Federal Ridings since 1867. Library of Parliament.

== See also ==
- List of Canadian electoral districts
- Historical federal electoral districts of Canada
