= Marvin Howe =

Canadian politician

William Marvin Howe
- Official 1968 portrait

Member of Parliament for Wellington—Huron
- In office August 1953 – June 1968

Member of Parliament for Wellington—Grey
- In office June 1968 – September 1972

Personal details
- Born: 24 February 1906 Palmerston, Ontario, Canada
- Died: 17 July 1996 (aged 90)
- Party: Progressive Conservative
- Profession: merchant

William Marvin Howe (24 February 1906 – 17 July 1996) was a Progressive Conservative party member of the House of Commons of Canada. He was born in Palmerston, Ontario and became a merchant by career.

Marvin Howe was first elected at the Wellington—Huron riding in the 1953 general election, then re-elected there in 1957, 1958, 1962, 1963 and 1965. In the 1968 federal election, Howe was re-elected at the newly configured Wellington—Grey riding. In 1972, after completing his term in the 28th Canadian Parliament, Howe left federal office and did not seek re-election to the House of Commons.
