= Dufferin—Peel—Wellington—Grey (provincial electoral district) =

Former provincial electoral district in Ontario, Canada

Dufferin—Peel—Wellington—Grey is a former provincial electoral district in southwestern Ontario, Canada, that elected one Member of the Legislative Assembly of Ontario. It was created in 1999 from Wellington, Grey and Dufferin—Peel. It was abolished in 2007 into Dufferin—Caledon, Bruce—Grey—Owen Sound, Perth—Wellington and Wellington—Halton Hills ridings.

The riding included all of Dufferin County plus the municipalities of Caledon, Erin, West Luther Township, Arthur, Southgate and Mount Forest.

The provincial riding of Dufferin—Peel—Wellington—Grey was created when the Harris government passed a bill reducing the number of ridings electing Members of Provincial Parliament (MPPs) in the Legislative Assembly so that they were the same as the number of federal Members of Parliament from Ontario.

David Tilson of the Progressive Conservative Party of Ontario was elected from the riding in the 1999 provincial election. In April 2002, Tilson resigned his seat in order to give the newly elected party leader and Premier of Ontario, Ernie Eves, an opportunity to enter the provincial legislature through a by-election. Eves won the by-election and retained his seat in the subsequent 2003 election although his government was defeated.

Eves subsequently resigned as party leader and, on January 31, 2005, he resigned his seat in order to give his successor, John Tory the opportunity to enter the legislature through a by-election.

The by-election was held on March 17, 2005. Tory was the Progressive Conservative candidate against Bob Duncanson for the Ontario Liberal Party, Lynda McDougall for the Ontario New Democratic Party, Frank de Jong who was leader of the Green Party of Ontario as well as the party's candidate, and independent Representative candidate William Cook. Tory won, with 56.3% of the vote.

== Members of Provincial Parliament ==
Dufferin—Peel—Wellington—Grey
Assembly	Years	Member	Party
Riding created from Dufferin—Peel, Grey, and Wellington
37th	1999–2002	David Tilson	Progressive Conservative
37th	2002–2003	Ernie Eves	Progressive Conservative
38th	2003–2005	Ernie Eves	Progressive Conservative
38th	2005–2007	John Tory	Progressive Conservative
Riding dissolved into Bruce—Grey—Owen Sound, Dufferin—Caledon, Perth—Wellington, and Wellington—Halton Hills

== Election results ==
Ontario provincial by-election, March 17, 2005 Resignation of Ernie Eves
Party	Candidate	Votes	%	±%
Progressive Conservative	John Tory	15,893	56.67	+0.03
Liberal	Bob Duncanson	4,621	16.48	–12.33
New Democratic	Lynda Mcdougall	3,891	13.87	+7.77
Green	Frank de Jong	2,767	9.87	+3.74
Family Coalition	Paul Micelli	488	1.74	–0.59
Independent	Bill Cook	164	0.58	–
Libertarian	Philip Bender	135	0.48	–
Independent	John Turmel	88	0.31	–
Total valid votes		28,047	99.51	
Total rejected, unmarked and declined ballots		137	0.49	+0.06
Turnout		28,184	31.31	–27.18
Eligible voters		90,004		
Progressive Conservative hold		Swing		+6.18
Source: Elections Ontario0

2003 Ontario general election
Party	Candidate	Votes	%	±%
Progressive Conservative	Ernie Eves	29,222	56.64	+10.05
Liberal	Dan Yake	14,859	28.80	–6.94
Green	Frank de Jong	3,161	6.13	–0.02
New Democratic	Mitchel Healey	3,148	6.10	–1.92
Family Coalition	Dave Davies	1,202	2.33	–0.79
Total valid votes		51,592	99.58	
Total rejected, unmarked and declined ballots		219	0.42	–0.04
Turnout		51,811	58.50	+18.65
Eligible voters		88,571		
Progressive Conservative hold		Swing		+8.49
Source: Elections Ontario

Ontario provincial by-election, May 2, 2002 Resignation of David Tilson
Party	Candidate	Votes	%	±%
Progressive Conservative	Ernie Eves	15,288	46.59	–18.16
Liberal	Josh Matlow	11,728	35.74	+6.92
New Democratic	Doug Wilcox	2,633	8.02	+4.06
Green	Richard Procter	2,017	6.15	+3.70
Family Coalition	Dave Davies	1,025	3.12	–
Independent	John Turmel	120	0.37	–
Total valid votes		32,811	99.53	
Total rejected, unmarked and declined ballots		154	0.47	–0.25
Turnout		32,965	39.84	–18.77
Eligible voters		82,734		
Progressive Conservative hold		Swing		–12.54
Source: Elections Ontario

1999 Ontario general election
Party	Candidate	Votes	%	±%
Progressive Conservative	David Tilson	30,532	64.76	–
Liberal	Steve White	13,591	28.83	–
New Democratic	Noel Duignan	1,871	3.97	–
Green	Richard Procter	1,156	2.45	–
Total valid votes		47,150	99.28	
Total rejected, unmarked and declined ballots		342	0.72	–
Turnout		47,492	58.62	–
Eligible voters		81,020		
Progressive Conservative notional hold		Swing		–
Source: Elections Ontario

== See also ==
- List of Ontario provincial electoral districts
- Canadian provincial electoral districts
