= John McDermid =

Canadian politician (1940–2024)

The Honourable John McDermid PC

Member of Parliament for Brampton–Georgetown
- In office 1979–1988
- Preceded by: Riding established
- Succeeded by: Riding dissolved

Member of Parliament for Brampton
- In office 1988–1993
- Preceded by: Riding established
- Succeeded by: Colleen Beaumier

Personal details
- Born: David Michael Date; 17 March 1940 Hamilton, Ontario, Canada
- Died: 6 December 2024 (aged 84)
- Party: Progressive Conservative
- Profession: Marketing manager

John Horton McDermid, PC, FRI (17 March 1940 – 6 December 2024) was a Canadian politician.

== Life and career ==
Born as David Michael Date to a teenage mother, he was adopted by Reverend John McDermid and his wife, Nora.

McDermid worked in marketing, public relations and broadcasting before he entered politics. He was elected to the House of Commons of Canada in the 1979 federal election as the Progressive Conservative Member of Parliament for Brampton—Georgetown outside of Toronto, Ontario.

He was re-elected in the 1980, 1984 and 1988 elections. He became a parliamentary secretary when the Tories took power in 1984. From 1988 to 1993, he served in the Cabinet of Prime Minister Brian Mulroney as series of junior minister positions: Minister of State for Housing (1988–1989), International Trade (1988-1989), Privatization and Regulatory Affairs (1989–1991), and Finance and Privatization (1991–1993).

He left Cabinet with the departure of Mulroney as Prime Minister of Canada in June 1993, and did not run in the 1993 federal election.

McDermid received the Queen Elizabeth II's Golden Jubilee Medal (2002) in his role as Lieutenant Colonel, the Queen Elizabeth II’s Diamond Jubilee Medal (2012), and the King Charles III Coronation Medal (2024).

McDermid died through euthanasia on 6 December 2024, at the age of 84.

== Electoral record ==
1988 Canadian federal election: Brampton
Party	Candidate	Votes
Progressive Conservative	John McDermid	29,473
Liberal	Harbhajan Pandori	14,047
New Democratic	John Morris	10,284
Christian Heritage	Don Eddie	2,698
Libertarian	George Dance	593

1984 Canadian federal election
Party	Candidate	Votes
Progressive Conservative	John McDermid	47,743
Liberal	William Ross Milne	23,325
New Democratic	John Deamer	13,356
Green	Steven Kaasgaard	458
Communist	James Bridgewood	153

1980 Canadian federal election
Party	Candidate	Votes
Progressive Conservative	John McDermid	25,243
Liberal	William Ross Milne	24,876
New Democratic	David Moulton	11,978
Libertarian	Joe Yundt	201
Communist	James Bridgewood	64
Marxist–Leninist	Marsha Fine	40

1979 Canadian federal election
Party	Candidate	Votes
Progressive Conservative	John McDermid	31,042
Liberal	William Ross Milne	22,270
New Democratic	David Moulton	11,584
Libertarian	Joe Yundt	243
Communist	James Bridgewood	77
Marxist–Leninist	Marsha Fine	45
