= Dufferin—Caledon =

Federal electoral district in Ontario, Canada

Coordinates: 44.0°N 80.1°W

Ontario electoral district
- Interactive map of riding boundaries from the 2025 federal election

Federal electoral district
- Legislature: House of Commons
MP
Kyle Seeback
Conservative
- District created: 2003
- First contested: 2004
- Last contested: 2025
- District webpage: profile, map

Demographics
- Population (2021): 142,838
- Electors (2021): 108,375
- Area (km²): 2,293
- Pop. density (per km²): 62.3
- Census division(s): Dufferin County, Peel
- Census subdivision(s): Caledon (part), Orangeville, Mono, Shelburne, Amaranth, Grand Valley, Mulmur, Melancthon, East Garafraxa

Dufferin—Caledon is a federal electoral district in Ontario, Canada, that has been represented in the House of Commons of Canada since 2004.

It was created in 2003 from parts of Dufferin—Peel—Wellington—Grey riding.

This riding gained a fraction of territory from Vaughan during the 2012 electoral redistribution.

After David Tilson's resignation, in March 2019 the Dufferin—Caledon nomination for the Conservative Party in the 2019 election was won by Harzadan Singh Khattra, amid accusations within the party of vote tampering, membership reimbursement, and payments to foreign students to attend, despite their ineligibility within party rules.

Following the 2022 Canadian federal electoral redistribution, the riding lost all of Caledon south of King Street and west of The Gore Road to Brampton North—Caledon. These changes came into effect for the 2025 Canadian federal election.

== Demographics ==
According to the 2021 Canadian census, 2023 representation order

Race: 81.7% White, 6.9% South Asian, 3.8% Black, 1.6% Indigenous, 1.5% Latin American
Languages: 82.7% English, 3.5% Italian, 3.0% Punjabi, 1.3% French, 1.3% Portuguese, 1.1% Spanish
Religions: 59.9% Christian (32.2% Catholic, 5.7% United Church, 4.8% Anglican, 1.8% Presbyterian, 1.4% Christian Orthodox, 1.4% Pentecostal, 1.0% Baptist, 11.5% Other), 4.0% Sikh, 1.6% Hindu, 1.2% Muslim, 32.1% None
Median income: $45,600 (2020)
Average income: $60,700 (2020)

== Member of Parliament ==
Parliament	Years	Member	Party
Dufferin—Caledon; Riding created from Dufferin—Peel—Wellington—Grey
38th	2004–2006	David Tilson	Conservative
39th	2006–2008	David Tilson	Conservative
40th	2008–2011	David Tilson	Conservative
41st	2011–2015	David Tilson	Conservative
42nd	2015–2019	David Tilson	Conservative
43rd	2019–2021	Kyle Seeback	Conservative
44th	2021–2025	Kyle Seeback	Conservative
45th	2025–present	Kyle Seeback	Conservative

== Election results ==
View source data.
Graph of election results in Dufferin—Caledon (minor parties that never got 2% of the vote or didn't run consistently are omitted)

2025 Canadian federal election
Party	Candidate	Votes	%	±%
Conservative	Kyle Seeback	42,458	60.14	+11.10
Liberal	Malalai Halimi	24,818	35.16	+6.53
New Democratic	Viktor Karklins	1,380	1.95	–8.42
Green	Ifra Baig	927	1.31	–3.20
People's	Dympna Carolan	752	1.07	–6.05
Independent	Jeffrey Halsall	260	0.37	N/A
Total valid votes		70,595	99.55	
Total rejected ballots		318	0.45	-0.06
Turnout		70,913	71.06	+9.45
Eligible voters		99,794		
Conservative hold		Swing		+2.29
Source: Elections Canada

2021 federal election redistributed results
Party	Vote	%
Conservative	28,338	49.04
Liberal	16,541	28.63
New Democratic	5,995	10.38
People's	4,112	7.12
Green	2,606	4.51
Independent	188	0.33
Total valid votes	57,780	99.49
Rejected ballots	295	0.51
Registered voters/ estimated turnout	94,259	61.61

2021 Canadian federal election
Party	Candidate	Votes	%	±%	Expenditures
Conservative	Kyle Seeback	31,490	48.0	+6.0	$114,758.32
Liberal	Lisa Post	19,867	30.3	-2.7	$46,734.31
New Democratic	Samantha Sanchez	6,866	10.5	-1.1	$250.74
People's	Anthony Zambito	4,389	6.7	+4.5	none listed
Green	Jenni Michelle Le Forestier	2,754	4.2	-6.4	$30,773.52
Independent	Stephen McKendrick	207	0.3	–	$1,450.00
Total valid votes		65,573	99.4		
Total rejected ballots		398	0.6		
Turnout		65,971	60.83		
Eligible voters		108,445			
Source: Elections Canada

2019 Canadian federal election
Party	Candidate	Votes	%	±%	Expenditures
Conservative	Kyle Seeback	28,852	42.0	-4.28	$120,879.34
Liberal	Michele Fisher	22,645	33.0	-6.11	$47,017.22
New Democratic	Allison Brown	7,981	11.6	+4.32	$2,935.40
Green	Stefan Wiesen	7,303	10.6	+3.27	$35,743.85
People's	Chad Ransom	1,516	2.2	–	$14,281.99
Christian Heritage	Russ Emo	319	0.5	–	$1,435.59
Total valid votes/expense limit		68,616	100.0		
Total rejected ballots		447			
Turnout		69,063	65.1		
Eligible voters		106,138			
Conservative hold		Swing		+0.92	
Source: Elections Canada

2015 Canadian federal election
Party	Candidate	Votes	%	±%	Expenditures
Conservative	David Tilson	27,977	46.28	-12.73	$89,524.29
Liberal	Ed Crewson	23,643	39.11	+26.01	$98,995.67
Green	Nancy Urekar	4,433	7.33	-7.36	$29,801.14
New Democratic	Rehya Yazbek	4,398	7.28	-5.92	$9,127.01
Total valid votes/expense limit		60,451	100.00		$234,924.06
Total rejected ballots		232	0.38	–	
Turnout		60,683	65.63		
Eligible voters		92,461			
Conservative hold		Swing		-19.37	
Source: Elections Canada

2011 federal election redistributed results
Party	Vote	%
Conservative	28,651	59.01
Green	7,132	14.69
New Democratic	6,409	13.20
Liberal	6,362	13.10

2011 Canadian federal election
Party	Candidate	Votes	%	±%	Expenditures
Conservative	David Tilson	28,647	59.00	+5.85	
Green	Ard Van Leeuwen	7,132	14.69	-2.11	
New Democratic	Leslie Parsons	6,409	13.20	+3.21	
Liberal	Bill Prout	6,361	13.10	-6.25	
Total valid votes		48,549	100.00		
Total rejected ballots		187	0.38	0.00	
Turnout		48,736	60.91	+3.20	
Eligible voters		80,019	–		
Conservative hold		Swing		+3.98	

2008 Canadian federal election
Party	Candidate	Votes	%	±%	Expenditures
Conservative	David Tilson	23,363	53.21	+5.28	$61,440
Liberal	Rebecca Finch	8,495	19.35	-10.58	$18,089
Green	Ard Van Leeuwen	7,377	16.80	+6.80	$66,728
New Democratic	Jason Bissett	4,385	9.99	-2.14	
Canadian Action	Dean Woods	284	0.65	*	$384
Total valid votes/expense limit		43,904	100.00	$84,072	
Total rejected ballots		168	0.38		
Turnout		44,072	57.71		
Conservative hold		Swing		+7.93	

2006 Canadian federal election
Party	Candidate	Votes	%	±%	Expenditures
Conservative	David Tilson	23,641	47.93	+1.01	$49,542
Liberal	Garry Moore	14,777	29.93	-12.82	$34,414
New Democratic	Chris Marquis	5,983	12.13	+2.88	$3,352
Green	Ted Alexander	4,912	10.00	+0.39	$10,218
Total valid votes/expense limit		49,313	100.00		
Total rejected ballots		166	0.34		
Turnout		49,479	64.94		
Conservative hold		Swing		+6.9	

2004 Canadian federal election
Party	Candidate	Votes	%	±%	Expenditures
Conservative	David Tilson	19,270	42.81	-5.00	
Liberal	Murray Calder	17,557	39.00	-6.93	
Green	Ted Alexander	3,947	8.77	+5.53	
New Democratic	Rita Landry	3,798	8.44	+5.42	
Christian Heritage	Ursula Ellis	443	0.98	-	
Total valid votes/expense limit		45,015	100.00		
Conservative hold		Swing		+1.0	

Change is based on redistributed results from part of Dufferin—Peel—Wellington—Grey in the 2000 election. Conservative vote is compared to the total of the Canadian Alliance and Progressive Conservative votes.

== See also ==
- List of Canadian electoral districts
- Historical federal electoral districts of Canada
