= Brampton (federal electoral district) =

Former federal electoral district in Ontario, Canada

Ontario electoral district

Defunct federal electoral district
- Legislature: House of Commons
- District created: 1987
- District abolished: 1996
- First contested: 1988
- Last contested: 1993

Demographics
- Population (1991): 166,746

Brampton was a federal electoral district in Ontario, Canada, that was represented in the House of Commons of Canada from 1988 to 1997. This riding was created in 1987, from Brampton—Georgetown riding, and was abolished in 1996, when it was redistributed between Brampton Centre and Brampton West—Mississauga ridings.

It consisted of that part of the city of Brampton lying west of Dixie Road.

== History ==
Incumbent John McDermid was made the Minister of Housing two weeks before the 1988 federal election was called, shortly after negotiating the Canada–United States Free Trade Agreement.

Three weeks after the election was called, Liberals nominated Harbhajan Pandori, a 41-year-old computer analyst for Canadian Tire. He was a resident of Mississauga, and "president of the large Sikh temple". He campaigned against the proposed federal sales tax (the GST) and 'supermailboxes' in new subdivisions. NDP candidate John Morris focused on campaigning against free trade.

== Members of Parliament ==
This riding has elected the following members of Parliament:

Parliament	Years	Member	Party
Riding created from Brampton—Georgetown
34th	1988–1993	John McDermid	Progressive Conservative
35th	1993–1997	Colleen Beaumier	Liberal
Riding dissolved into Brampton Centre and Brampton West—Mississauga

== Election results ==
1988 Canadian federal election
Party	Candidate	Votes
Progressive Conservative	John McDermid	29,473
Liberal	Harbhajan Pandori	14,047
New Democratic	John Morris	10,284
Christian Heritage	Don Eddie	2,698
Libertarian	George Dance	593

1993 Canadian federal election
Party	Candidate	Votes
Liberal	Colleen Beaumier	35,203
Reform	Ernie McDonald	18,196
Progressive Conservative	Susan Fennell	12,134
New Democratic Party	John Morris	1,925
Natural Law	Maxim Newby	455
Marxist–Leninist	Amarjit Dhillon	245

== See also ==
- List of Canadian electoral districts
- Historical federal electoral districts of Canada
