= Wellington—Grey—Dufferin—Simcoe =

Former federal electoral district in Ontario, Canada

Ontario electoral district

Defunct federal electoral district
- Legislature: House of Commons
- District created: 1987
- District abolished: 1996
- First contested: 1988
- Last contested: 1993

Wellington—Grey—Dufferin—Simcoe was a federal electoral district represented in the House of Commons of Canada from 1988 to 1997. It was located in the province of Ontario. This riding was created in 1987 from parts of Bruce—Grey, Grey—Simcoe and Wellington—Dufferin—Simcoe ridings.

The electoral district was abolished in 1996 when it was re-distributed between Dufferin—Peel—Wellington—Grey, Simcoe—Grey and Waterloo—Wellington ridings.

Wellington—Grey—Dufferin—Simcoe consisted of the County of Dufferin; the Town of Thornbury, the Village of Dundalk and the townships of Collingwood, Egremont, Osprey and Proton in the County of Grey; the towns of Collingwood and Stayner, the Village of Creemore and the Township of Nottawasaga in the County of Simcoe; and the towns of Fergus, Harriston, Mount Forest and Palmerston, the villages of Arthur, Clifford and Elora, and the townships of Arthur, Minto, Nichol, West Garafraxa and West Luther in the County of Wellington.

== Members of Parliament ==
This riding has elected the following members of Parliament:

Parliament	Years	Member	Party
Riding created from Wellington—Dufferin—Simcoe, Grey—Simcoe and Bruce—Grey
34th	1988–1993	Perrin Beatty	Progressive Conservative
35th	1993–1997	Murray Calder	Liberal
Riding dissolved into Dufferin—Peel—Wellington—Grey, Simcoe—Grey and Waterloo—Wellington

== Election results ==
1988 Canadian federal election
Party	Candidate	Votes
Progressive Conservative	Perrin Beatty	26,066
Liberal	Murray Calder	15,494
New Democratic	Shirley Farlinger	7,746
Christian Heritage	Bert Nieuwenhuis	1,761
Libertarian	Oleh Stebelsky	157

1993 Canadian federal election: Wellington—Grey—Dufferin—Simcoe
Party	Candidate	Votes	%	±%
Liberal	Murray Calder	20,374		
Progressive Conservative	Perrin Beatty	18,665		
Reform	Bob Greenland	15,160		
New Democratic	Dan Heffernan	2,090		
Green	Sara Francis	566		

== See also ==
- List of Canadian electoral districts
- Historical federal electoral districts of Canada
