= Brampton West—Mississauga (federal electoral district) =

Former federal electoral district in Ontario, Canada

Ontario electoral district
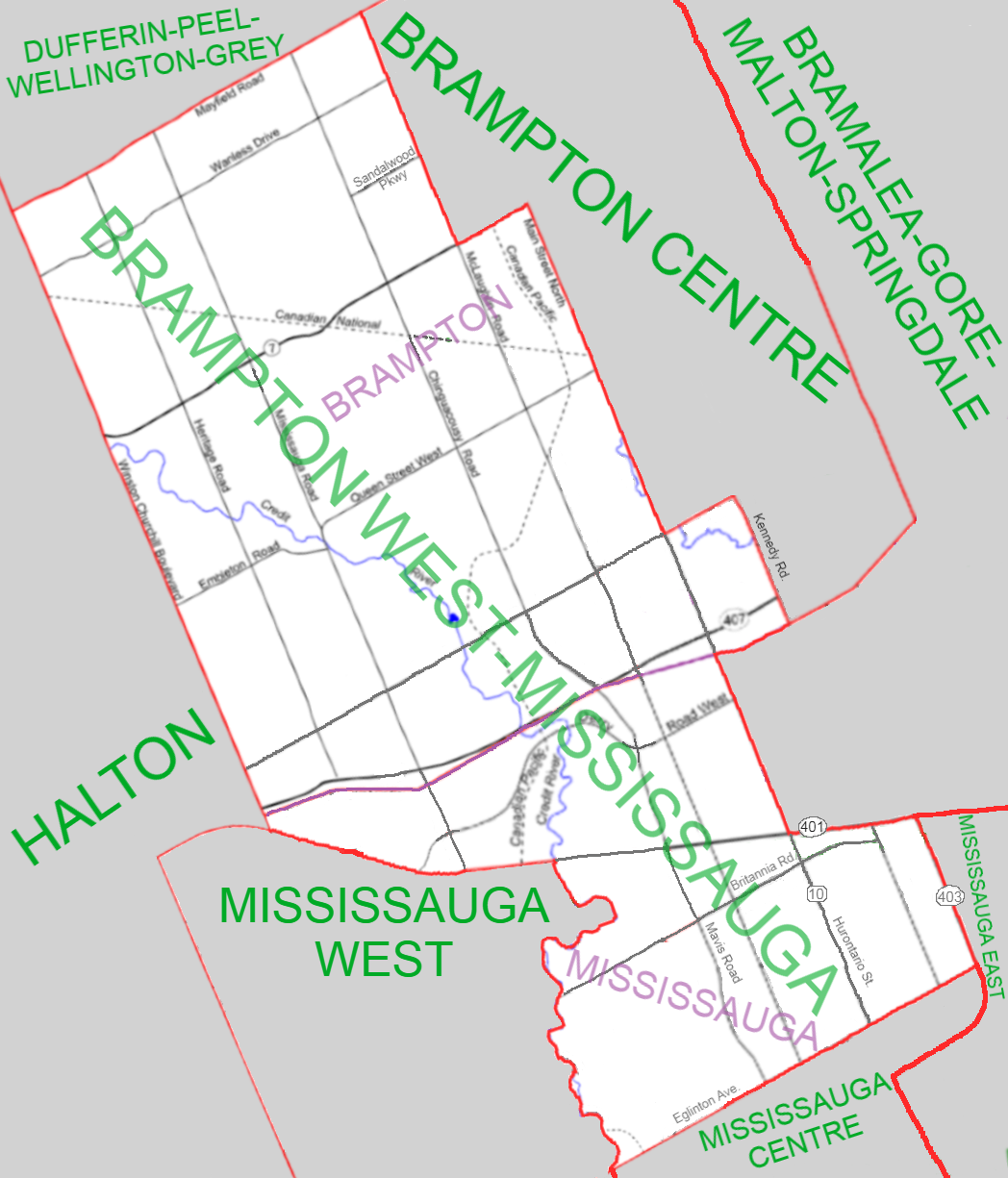
- Map of the riding

Defunct federal electoral district
- Legislature: House of Commons
- District created: 1996
- District abolished: 2003
- First contested: 1997
- Last contested: 2000

Demographics
- Census division: Peel
- Census subdivision(s): Brampton, Mississauga

Brampton West—Mississauga was a federal electoral district in Ontario, Canada, that was represented in the House of Commons of Canada from 1997 to 2004. This riding was created in 1996, from parts of Brampton riding.

It consisted of the parts of the cities of Brampton and Mississauga bounded by a line drawn from the northwest corner of the City of Brampton northeast along that limit, southeast along McLaughlin Road, northeast along Highway No. 7, southeast along Main Street, northeast along Steeles Avenue, southeast along Kennedy Road, southwest along the limit between the cities of Brampton and Mississauga, southeast along Hurontario Street, east along the Macdonald-Cartier Freeway, southeast along Highway No. 403, southwest along Eglinton Avenue, northwest along the Credit River, west along the Macdonald-Cartier Freeway to the eastern corner of the Town of Halton Hills on the limit of the City of Mississauga, northwest along the limits of the cities of Mississauga and Brampton to the point of commencement.

The electoral district was abolished in 2003 when it was redistributed between Brampton West, Mississauga—Brampton South and Mississauga—Streetsville ridings.

== Members of Parliament ==
The riding has elected the following members of Parliament:

| Parliament | Years | Member | Party |
|---|---|---|---|
Brampton West—Mississauga; Riding created from Brampton
| 36th | 1997–2000 | Colleen Beaumier | Liberal |
| 37th | 2000–2004 | Colleen Beaumier | Liberal |
Riding dissolved into Brampton West, Mississauga—Brampton South and Mississauga—Streetsville

== Election results ==
1993 Canadian federal election
| Party | Candidate | Votes |
|---|---|---|
| Liberal | Colleen Beaumier | 35,203 |
| Reform | Ernie Mcdonald | 18,196 |
| Progressive Conservative | Susan Fennell | 12,134 |
| New Democratic | John Morris | 1,925 |
| Natural Law | Maxim Newby | 455 |
| Marxist–Leninist | Amarjit Dhillon | 245 |

1997 Canadian federal election
| Party | Candidate | Votes |
|---|---|---|
| Liberal | Colleen Beaumier | 27,297 |
| Progressive Conservative | Kirk Robertson | 8,447 |
| Reform | Ernie McDonald | 7,569 |
| New Democratic | Nirmal Dhinsa | 2,192 |

2000 Canadian federal election
| Party | Candidate | Votes |
|---|---|---|
| Liberal | Colleen Beaumier | 31,041 |
| Alliance | Hardial Sangha | 7,666 |
| Progressive Conservative | W. Glenn Harewood | 5,957 |
| New Democratic | Matt Harsant | 1,567 |
| Green | Mike Hofer | 529 |

== See also ==
- List of Canadian electoral districts
- Historical federal electoral districts of Canada
