= Dufferin—Peel—Wellington—Grey (federal electoral district) =

Former federal electoral district in Ontario, Canada

Ontario electoral district

Defunct federal electoral district
- Legislature: House of Commons
- District created: 1996
- District abolished: 2003
- First contested: 1997
- Last contested: 2000

Dufferin—Peel—Wellington—Grey was a federal electoral district in Ontario, Canada, that was represented in the House of Commons of Canada from 27 April 1997 to 22 May 2004.

== Federal electoral district ==
The federal riding was created as a result of redistribution in 1996 from parts of Guelph—Wellington, Halton—Peel and Wellington—Grey—Dufferin—Simcoe ridings. Located west of Toronto, the largely rural electoral district's largest centre is the town of Orangeville, Ontario. The riding consisted of the entire County of Dufferin; that part of the County of Grey contained in the townships of Egremont and Proton and the Village of Dundalk; that part of the County of Wellington contained in the townships of Erin and West Luther, the Town of Mount Forest and the villages of Arthur and Erin and that part of the Regional Municipality of Peel contained in the Town of Caledon.

The riding's first vote was the 1997 federal election in which Liberal Murray Calder became its Member of Parliament. Calder was re-elected in the 2000 election.

The federal electoral district was abolished in 2003 when it was redistributed between Dufferin—Caledon, Grey—Bruce—Owen Sound, Perth Wellington and Wellington—Halton Hills ridings.

== Members of Parliament ==
The riding has elected the following members of Parliament:

Parliament	Years	Member	Party
Dufferin—Peel—Wellington—Grey; Riding created from Wellington—Grey—Dufferin—Simcoe, Halton—Peel and Guelph—Wellington
36th	1997–2000	Murray Calder	Liberal
37th	2000–2004	Murray Calder	Liberal
Riding dissolved into Dufferin—Caledon, Wellington—Halton Hills, Perth Wellington and Grey—Bruce—Owen Sound

== Election results ==
1997 Canadian federal election
Party	Candidate	Votes	%
Liberal	Murray Calder	20,957	42.62
Reform	Dave Davies	14,760	30.02
Progressive Conservative	Eleanor Taylor	11,089	22.55
New Democratic	Kevin Kelly	2,355	4.70

2000 Canadian federal election
Party	Candidate	Votes	%
Liberal	Murray Calder	21,678	45.47
Alliance	Don Crawford	15,128	31.73
Progressive Conservative	Richard Majkot	7,926	16.62
New Democratic	Mitchel Healey	1,473	3.09
Green	Robert Strang	1,464	3.07

== See also ==
- List of Canadian electoral districts
- Historical federal electoral districts of Canada
