= Green Party of Canada candidates in the 2006 Canadian federal election =

The Green Party of Canada ran a full slate of 308 candidates in the 2006 Canadian federal election. Some of these candidates have separate biography pages; relevant information about other candidates may be found here.

The candidates are listed by province and riding name.

== Prince Edward Island ==
=== Sharon Labchuk (Malpeque) ===
Sharon Labchuk previously ran for the Green Party in the 2004 federal election, also in Malpeque. She lost to Wayne Easter of the Liberal Party of Canada. Labchuk received 1,037 votes to Easter's 9,782.

== Nova Scotia ==
=== Chris Milburn (Sydney—Victoria) ===
Chris Milburn is a physician. He was born in Sydney, Cape Breton Island, Nova Scotia, and trained in emergency and family medicine at Queen's University in Kingston, Ontario. Milburn held several medical positions in and around the Kingston area after graduating, including a stint as a clinic doctor in Lansdowne after the small community lost its previous doctor (KWS, 22 November 2000). He is also a skilled athlete, and has participated in several triathlons. Milburn was a member of the Kingston Whig-Standard's community editorial board in the late 1990s, and frequently contributed to its columns (KWS, 11 October 2000).

Milburn joined the Green Party shortly before the 2000 federal election, and campaigned in the Ontario riding of Kingston and the Islands. He emphasized health issues, and wrote against the privatisation of prescription medicine (KWS, 1 November 2000). Milburn received 2,652 votes (5.18%), the best showing for a Green candidate outside of British Columbia. He defeated Fred Perel to win the Green Party of Ontario nomination for Kingston and the Islands in the 2003 provincial election (KWS, 9 October 2002). However, Melburn left for a job in New Brunswick shortly before the campaign (KWS, 8 September 2003).

At the time of the 2004 election, Milburn was a physician with the emergency unit at Cape Breton Regional Hospital (Medical Post, 15 June 2004). He had recently purchased the historic site of the old City Hospital, where he planned to build a "green" neighbourhood. Milburn was 34 years old. He received 855 votes, finishing fourth.

As of 2005, Milburn is the GPC's Healthcare Advocate.

Electoral record
Election	Division	Party	Votes	%	Place	Winner
2000 federal	Kingston and the Islands	Green	2,652	5.18	5/5	Peter Milliken, Liberal
2004 federal	Sydney—Victoria	Green	855		4/6	Mark Eyking, Liberal
2006 federal	Sydney—Victoria	Green	1,336		4/4	Mark Eyking, Liberal

=== Nick Wright (Halifax) ===
Nick Wright ran in the Halifax riding. He received 1,948 votes, 3.9% of the popular vote in a riding dominated by long-time NDP candidate Alexa McDonough.

== Quebec ==
=== Adam Sommerfeld (Longueuil—Pierre-Boucher) ===
Adam Sommerfeld is both a young politician and a veteran environmental activist. While in high school, he started the LEAF (Lisgar Environmental Action Force) organization and affiliated it with the Sierra Youth Coalition. Sommerfeld was also active with the OPIRG-affiliated group Enviro-Action while attending the University of Ottawa. He holds a Bachelor of Fine Arts degree from Concordia University in Montreal.

Sommerfeld joined the Green Party of Canada in 2000 at age eighteen, and campaigned under its banner in the 2000 federal election. The 2006 campaign was his third for the party.

Electoral record
Election	Division	Party	Votes	%	Place	Winner
2000 federal	Ottawa—Vanier	Green	1,083	2.25	5/9	Mauril Bélanger, Liberal Party of Canada
2004 federal	Mount Royal	Green	1,046	2.8	5/7	Irwin Cotler, Liberal Party of Canada
2006 federal	Longueuil—Pierre-Boucher	Green	1,995	4.0	5/6	Caroline St-Hilaire, Bloc Québécois

== Ontario ==
=== Beaches—East York: Jim Harris ===
Jim Harris was the leader of the Green Party of Canada.

=== Brampton—Springdale: Ian Raymond Chiocchio ===
Ian Raymond Chiocchio holds a Bachelor of Business Administration degree from Brock University, and completed a two-year management training program with a Fortune 500 company. He was assistant manager of the Brock University pub; as of 2006, he is the co-owner of a landscaping business. Chiocchio received 1,853 votes (3.93%), finishing fourth against Liberal incumbent Ruby Dhalla.

=== Brant: Adam King ===
Adam King was born in London, Ontario. King spent most of his childhood and teenage years in Bangladesh, where his family worked for a Baptist non-governmental organization; further, he became interested in social issues at an early age. King's family returned to Canada in 1999. In 2007, he finished a Bachelor of Arts degree in Political Science from York University. King was 23 years old during the 2006 campaign.

King has also run for the Brantford city council. He served on the City of Brantford's heritage committee, planning department, and cultural network from 2006 to 2008. In 2007, King started an ethical coffee chain.

Electoral record
Election	Division	Party	Votes	%	Place	Winner
2006 federal	Brant	Green	2,729	4.57	4/6	Lloyd St. Amand, Liberal
2006 municipal	Brantford, Council Ward Five	n/a	774	9.52	4/6	Marguerite Ceschi-Smith and John K. Bradford

=== Bruce—Grey—Owen Sound: Shane Jolley ===
Shane Jolley ran the most successful Green Party campaign in the 2006 election.

Electoral record
Election	Division	Party	Votes	%	Place	Winner
2006 federal	Bruce—Grey—Owen Sound	Green	6,735	12.91%	3/4	Larry Miller, Conservative

=== Carleton—Mississippi Mills: Jake Cole ===
Jake Cole has lived in Kanata with his wife and two children for over 28 years. He is an active member of the local community. Cole volunteered with the Scouts Canada Kanata branch, the Canadian Mental Health Association, and the Earl of March Secondary School Parent's Council; he also coached community baseball, soccer and hockey.

Educated as a civil engineer in Ottawa, Cole has spent more than 30 years working as a public servant for the federal government. In that time, he has led the Canadian contingent on the International Energy Agency's projects in solar, wind, and renewable energy. Coled also led Canada's R-2000 Home Energy Program, created and led a unique health and well-being program for 11,000 federal employees and currently manages the Canadian Coast Guard's environmental program.

As a long-standing community member, Cole has been very active in a variety of campaigns and grass roots political movements. In 1990, Cole helped form the first Green Party of Canada chapter in Kanata. He has been an active campaigner against cosmetic pesticides use on lawns and playing fields. Cole is the communication advisor for the Canadian Organic Growers. He made submissions to the Kirby and Romanow Health Commissions. Cole actively campaigns for health promotion programs.

=== Eglinton—Lawrence: Patrick Metzger ===
Patrick Metzger holds an Honours Bachelor of Arts degree in French and English literature from the University of Western Ontario, and a Master of Business Administration from the Richard Ivey School of Business. Metzger has in the banking and brokerage industry for 15 years, including experience with Merrill Lynch in Hong Kong. After returning to Canada in 2001, he changed careers and became a writer and television producer. Metzger received 2,520 votes (5.12%), finishing fourth against Liberal incumbent Joe Volpe.

=== Etobicoke–Lakeshore: Philip Ridge ===
Philip Ridge ran against Michael Ignatieff who later became the leader of the Liberal Party.

Ridge comes from a diverse background of engineering and marketing and currently owns Ridge Energy Consultants Inc. and The Energy Store.

Ridge successfully increased Green Party votes by a high percentage. His main thrust was educating the public on the amount of toxins produced in the riding, which is the highest in Toronto.

=== Haliburton—Kawartha Lakes—Brock: Andy Harjula ===
Andy Harjula was born in Finland and moved to Ontario as a child. He has a diploma in forestry from Lakehead University in Thunder Bay and a Master's Degree in forestry from Colorado State University. Harjula moved to Cavan, Ontario in 1988.

Harjula worked for the Ontario Ministry of Natural Resources for 27 years, accepting retirement when Mike Harris's government made cutbacks to the department. He has co-ordinated the establishment and operations of provincial parks and done landscape work. In 2006, Harjula was a director of the Victoria Lands and Water Stewardship Council and the Otonbee Conservation Foundation. He was 63 years old when he was nominated as a Green Party candidate in 2005.

Harjula was a member of the Conservative Party of Canada and its antecedents before joining the Greens. As a gun owner, he supported the Canadian Firearms Registry in the 2006 election. Harjula noted that "If (they) are stolen [...] I'd like (them) returned."

After the 2006 federal election, Harjula said that he would not seek federal office again. He ran for a council seat in Cavan in 2006 and 2010, finishing a close second both times.

Electoral record
Election	Division	Party	Votes	%	Place	Winner
2006 federal	Haliburton—Kawartha Lakes—Brock	Green	3,017	5.02	4/4	Barry Devolin, Conservative
2006 Cavan-Millbrook-North Monaghan municipal	Council, Cavan Ward	n/a	610	31.38	2/3	Jim C. Chaplin
2010 Cavan-Monaghan municipal	Council, Cavan Ward	n/a	749	36.18	2/4	Jim C. Chaplin

=== Hamilton Centre: John Livingstone ===
John Livingstone was born in Hamilton. He is a 22-year veteran of the Canadian Army and has served overseas in Germany and the Golan Heights, where he saw two tours of duty with the United Nations Disengagement Observer force. Livingston was 52 years old at the time of the election, and was operations director for a local branch of the Canadian Corps of Commissionaires. Before joining the Green Party, he volunteered for the Liberals (Hamilton Spectator, 13 January 2006). Livingstone received 2,022 votes (4.23%), finishing fourth against New Democratic Party incumbent David Christopherson.

=== Kingston and the Islands: Eric Walton ===
Eric Walton was born in Ottawa, and grew up in the Middle East, Asia and Europe (Kingston Whig-Standard, 21 January 2006). He received an Honours Bachelor of Arts degree in Political Studies from Queen's University in 1983. Walton is a co-founder of Odyssey Travel and Logkit Inc., both of which he later sold. In 1992, he co-produced and directed "Ancient Futures-Learning From Ladakh", filmed on site in northern India.

Walton was the part-time Agency Director of the Kingston Environmental Action Project from 1986 to 1994 (KWS, 7 January 2006), and was active in community affairs. He helped to re-launch the Kingston branch of the Green Party in 1992 (KWS, 23 November 1992), and was drafted to campaign for the Green Party of Ontario in 2003 when designated candidate Chris Milburn moved to Nova Scotia.

Walton won the 2006 GPC nomination in late 2004, over George Clark and Queen's Law student Danny Gold (KWS, 10 November 2004). He was endorsed by the Kingston Whig-Standard newspaper during the campaign (21 January 2006). As of 2007, Walton is the business manager of a medical clinic and the Green Party of Canada Shadow Cabinet Advocate/Critic for Industry and Entrepreneurship.

Electoral record
Election	Division	Party	Votes	%	Place	Winner
2003 provincial	Kingston and the Islands	Green	3,137	6.55	4/5	John Gerretsen, Liberal
2006 federal	Kingston and the Islands	Green	5,006	8.04	4/6	Peter Milliken, Liberal
2011 federal	Kingston and the Islands	Green	2,561	4.23	4/4	Ted Hsu, Liberal

=== Kitchener Centre: Tony Maas ===
Tony Maas was the federal Green Party candidate for the Kitchener Centre electoral district in Ontario in the 2006 elections. He received 5.6% of the vote in 2822 of 50194 votes cast.

=== Lanark—Frontenac—Lennox and Addington: Mike Nickerson ===
Mike Nickerson (born 1951) is a longtime environmental activist. He was a co-director of the Institute for the Study of Cultural Evolution in the 1970s, and helped produce its Guideposts for a Sustainable Future in 1974. In 1977, the background studies which led to the Guideposts were published as Change the World I Want to Stay On.

Nickerson was a founding member of the Green Party of Canada in 1983, and campaigned under its banner in the 1984 federal election. His mother, Betty Nickerson, was the first ever GPC candidate in a 1983 by-election (Ottawa Citizen, 2 January 2006). In 1988, Nickerson spoke out against the proposed Canada-United States free trade agreement (Toronto Star, 19 November 1988).

Nickerson completed production of the Guideposts for a Sustainable Future video in 1990; he published his second book, Planning for Seven Generations, in 1993. He is near completion of a third book entitled Life, Money and Illusion, and has composed several articles on environmentalism and economics. In 2001, Nickerson collaborated with Liberal Member of Parliament Joe Jordan to create the Canada Well-being Measurement Act (Kingston Whig-Standard, 21 February 2001).

In 2002, Nickerson wrote an article criticizing the provincial government of Ernie Eves for imposing a freeze on hydro rates. He supported the energy policies of the previous government of Mike Harris, which he argued encouraged conservation by forcing consumers to pay higher rates.

Nickerson is a woodworker in private life.

Electoral record
Election	Division	Party	Votes	%	Place	Winner
1984 federal	Leeds—Grenville	Green	348		4/5	Jennifer Cossitt, Progressive Conservative
2006 federal	Lanark—Frontenac—Lennox and Addington	Green	3,115	5.24	4/7	Scott Reid, Conservative

=== Leeds—Grenville: David Lee ===
David Lee was born on February 18, 1968. He was raised in Barrie and Peterborough, Ontario, where he served as an infantry scout; still 17, he later workedas a squad leader in the Hastings & Prince Edward Mechanized Infantry Regiment. Lee then put himself through school as a door-to-door salesman earning a B.A. in literature, history, and critical theory from Trent University. After graduation, he travelled and then became a tradesman. At the age of 26, David spent a year with two friends deep in the woods of the Smoky Mountains of northern Georgia building a log cabin from scratch, living off the land without electricity, and farming its adjacent field.

Upon his return, Lee earned a diploma in scriptwriting from Algonquin College. His first screenplay (the autobiographical story of two young men who embark on an adventure-filled road trip in search of J.D. Salinger) was optioned by CTV. In 1999, David was a government conference reporter, a screenwriter, and a semi-pro lacrosse player. In a pre-season (and pre-contract/insurance) game, David's lower back was permanently damaged. After his surgery he returned to school to earn an M.A. in political science.

Lee lived all over North America before settling in Nepean-Carleton on a farm south of Ottawa in the mid-1990s. Since 2001, he has done contract work for several government ministries. Most recently, Lee has worked as a communications officer covering Russia and the Iraq war for the Department of Foreign Affairs. When he was recovering from his surgeries, he taught himself how to sing, play harmonica, and sketch. Lee replaced athletics and camping with political philosophy and analysis, song-writing, and other indoor intellectual and artistic pursuits. He also volunteers for moderate environmental groups, disability advocates, and his church, where he sings in the choir. He is currently writing his first novel.

In 2005, Lee rebuilt the Leeds-Grenville Federal Green Party Association; he also won the nomination for the 2006 election. A rookie and parachute candidate, he still managed a top 40 result, increasing his party's 2004 vote by over forty percent.

Electoral record
Election	Division	Party	Votes	%	Place	Winner
2006 Federal	Leeds—Grenville	Green Party of Canada	3,008	5.8	4/4	Gord Brown, Conservative

=== Nepean—Carleton: Lori Gadzala ===
Lori Gadzala is a businesswoman from Manotick, Ontario. Having lived in Manotik for 10 years, Gadzala had previously lived in Gloucester, Ontario.

A graduate of Algonquin College, Gadzala runs her own private company South River Partners, a technology marketing writing and communications firm. She has previously worked for Cisco Systems, Nokia, Alcatel, and Gandalf Technologies.

Gadzala and her husband have received honourable mentions from the Rideau Valley Conservation Authority. In addition to other community activities, she is a brownie leader in her hometown.

- Campaign website
- Riding profile
- Lori's blog

=== Newmarket—Aurora: Glenn Hubbers ===
Glenn Hubbers is a professional engineer and project manager. He has been working in the energy industry since 1989 after graduating from McMaster University with a Bachelor of Engineering. Hubbers was instrumental in founding the Newmarket—Aurora Federal Green Party Association in 2005. The 39th Canadian General Election was his first time running for federal office. Hubbers earned 4.74% of the popular vote, placing fourth to Liberal incumbent Belinda Stronach. He won the nomination contest in 2007 and earned 8.2% of the popular vote in the 40th Canadian General Election. Hubbers maintains a personal blog.

- Newmarket—Aurora Federal Green Party Association
- Glenn's Blog

Federal election results

2008 Canadian federal election
Party	Candidate	Votes	%	±%
Conservative	Lois Brown	24,873	46.73%	+8.68%
Liberal	Tim Jones	18,250	34.29%	-11.93%
New Democratic	Mike Seaward	4,508	8.47%	-1.12%
Green	Glenn Hubbers	4,381	8.23%	+3.46%
Progressive Canadian	Dorian Baxter	1,004	1.89%	+0.65%
Christian Heritage	Ray Luff	211	0.40%	N/A
Conservative gain from Liberal		Swing		–

2006 Canadian federal election
Party	Candidate	Votes	%	±%
Liberal	Belinda Stronach	27,176	46.22%	+5.14%
Conservative	Lois Brown	22,371	38.05%	-4.37%
New Democratic	Ed Chudak	5,639	9.59%	-0.34%
Green	Glenn Hubbers	2,805	4.77%	+0.30%
Progressive Canadian	Dorian Baxter	729	1.24%	-0.86%
Canadian Action	Peter Maloney	79	0.13%	N/A
Liberal gain from Conservative		Swing	−4.8	

=== Ottawa West—Nepean: Neil Adair ===
Neil Adair is a businessman, chemist and web designer. Raised in Ottawa, he attended Carleton University and worked for eight years at the Canadian Conservation Institute as an analytical chemist. Adair then worked for Vickers Instruments for four years, including three years in Santa Clara, California. Desiring a change in life, he moved to the Dominican Republic to begin a windsurfing business.Adair remained in that country for ten years, starting three businesses and one charity. His windsurfing business was operated by solar panels and a wind generator.

Adair returned to Ottawa in 2001, and expressed an interest in working with solar and wind power. Since then, he has undertaken extensive web design work for the Green Party. Adair has campaigned for the federal party twice; he has also been a candidate of the Green Party of Ontario.

Electoral record
Election	Division	Party	Votes	%	Place	Winner
2003 provincial	Ottawa West—Nepean	Green	1,309	2.66	4/5	Jim Watson, Liberal
2004 federal	Ottawa West—Nepean	Green	2,748	4.79	4/7	Marlene Catterall, Liberal
2006 federal	Ottawa West—Nepean	Green	2,941	4.95	4/6	John Baird, Conservative

=== Peterborough: Brent Wood ===
Brent Wood born in Burlington, Ontario. He has a Bachelor of Arts degree from the University of Guelph, a Master of Arts degree from Trent University, and a Ph.D. from the University of Toronto. Wood has taught English at Toronto and Trent, with a focus on Canadian writers. He has also served on the executive of the Canadian Union of Public Employees Local 3908 at Trent. In 2004, Wood was a member of Peterborough's parks and recreation board. He ran for the Peterborough city council in 2003, opposing the extension of a local parkway. Wood has been a Green Party candidate in two federal elections.

Electoral record
Election	Division	Party	Votes	%	Place	Winner
2003 municipal	Peterborough Council, Ward Three	n/a	787	11.19	4/11	Bernard Cahill and Bill Juby
2004 federal	Peterborough	Green	3,182	5.52	4/2	Peter Adams, Liberal
2006 federal	Peterborough	Green	3,205	5.05	4/6	Dean Del Mastro, Conservative

=== Richmond Hill: Tim Rudkins ===
Tim Rudkins won 2,379 votes (4.57%)

=== St. Catharines: Jim Fannon ===
See article on Jim Fannon.

=== Simcoe—Grey: Peter Ellis ===
Peter Ellis is a businessman and teacher. He holds a Master of Science degree from McGill University in Montreal. Ellis began his career as a Biology teacher, and was a school principal for two years at Baffin Island in the Northwest Territories. He has been president of Peachtree Manufacturing Ltd. in 1986, and has served on the CNIB Simcoe/Muskoka District Board and the Halton Regional Conservation Authority.

Ellis first campaigned for the Green Party in Simcoe—Grey in the 2004 election.

Electoral record
Election	Division	Party	Votes	%	Place	Winner
2004 federal	Simcoe—Grey	Green	2,668	4.82	4/5	Helena Guergis, Conservative
2006 federal	Simcoe—Grey	Green	3,372	5.57	4/5	Helena Guergis, Conservative

=== Scarborough Southwest: Valery Philip ===
Valery Philip is a graduate of the Marketing and Business Program at Seneca College. She had worked for a number of years in the corporate world. Philip is now an aromatherapist, treating patients with AIDS and other serious diseases.

Philip received 1,827 votes (4.38%), finishing fourth against Liberal incumbent Tom Wappel.

=== Scarborough-Guildwood: Mike Flanagan ===
Mike Flanagan is a graduate of the University of Waterloo, with a degree in Psychology, and minors both in History and Criminology/Legal Studies. He received 1,235 votes (3%), finishing fourth against Liberal incumbent John McKay (politician). Flanagan currently serves as a director for the Toronto Vegetarian Association.

=== Sudbury: Joey Methé ===
Joey Methé was 18 years old at the time of the election, and was in his first year of public relations studies at Cambrian College. He is bilingual in English and French, and has promoted youth events focused on Franco-Ontarian culture. During the election, Methé described Pierre Trudeau as his favourite Canadian politician. He received 1,301 votes (2.73%), finishing fourth against Liberal incumbent Diane Marleau.

=== Thornhill: Lloyd Helferty ===
Lloyd Helferty was born in 1972 in Windsor and grew up in Richmond Hill. He lived in Richmond Hill until moving to Thornhill in December 2003. Helferty graduated from the RCC School of Electronics Technology as an Honours Electronics Technologist in 1995. He sits on the Executive of the Green Party of Ontario as Central Representative. Helferty also sits on the Executive of the Richmond Hill Naturalists club. In 2004, he received 1,622 votes (3.0%). Helferty's main opponent was Liberal incumbent Susan Kadis.

=== Toronto Centre: Chris Tindal ===
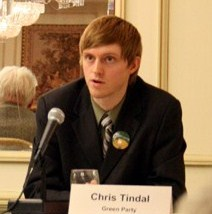
Tindal at the 2008 candidates' debate for the Toronto Centre riding

Chris Tindal (born June 3, 1981) was a candidate for Ward 27 in the 2010 Toronto municipal election. He was the Green Party of Canada's candidate for the House of Commons of Canada in Toronto Centre in the 2006 federal election and again in a March 17, 2008 by-election in which he placed third with 13.6% of the vote, ahead of the Conservative candidate.

Tindal holds a Bachelor of Arts in Radio and Television from Ryerson University. He is also a musician with two albums to his credit.

Tindal is an interactive media producer and former vice president of the Ontario Recreational Canoeing Association, and has lived in Toronto Centre since 2000. He serves on the board of directors of a boys and girls residential summer camp, and is a contributor to Torontoist, a community blog. Tindal was the Democratic Reform Advocate for the Green Party of Canada until August 2008.

Tindal is a coauthor of A Realistic Energy Plan for Toronto.

Electoral record

Canadian federal by-election, March 17, 2008: Toronto Centre Resignation of Bill Graham
Party	Candidate	Votes	%	±%
Liberal	Bob Rae	14,187	59.2	+7.0
New Democratic	El-Farouk Khaki	3,299	13.8	−9.9
Green	Chris Tindal	3,263	13.6	+8.4
Conservative	Donald Meredith	2,982	12.5	−5.7
Animal Alliance	Liz White	123	0.5	+0.4
Canadian Action	Doug Plumb	97	0.4	-
Liberal hold		Swing		+8.5

2006 Canadian federal election
Party	Candidate	Votes	%	±%
Liberal	Bill Graham	30,874	52.2%	-4.30%
New Democratic	Michael Shapcott	14,036	23.74%	-0.01%
Conservative	Lewis Reford	10,763	18.21%	+3.42%
Green	Chris Tindal	3,080	5.21%	+1.30%
Communist	Johan Boyden	120	0.20%	+0.01%
Not affiliated	Michel Prairie	101	0.17%	-0.02%
Animal Alliance	Liz White	72	0.12%	align=right
Marxist–Leninist	Philip Fernandez	66	0.11%	-0.01%
Liberal hold		Swing	−2.1	

=== Wellington—Halton Hills: Brent Bouteiller ===
Brent Bouteiller received a Bachelor of Engineering degree from Carleton University in 1990. He has been involved in a variety of focus groups concerned with transportation issues. Bouteiller is an entrepreneur, and has operated a model train shop near Fergus, Ontario since 1998.

Bouteiller joined the Green Party in 1999, and has campaigned for both its federal and provincial wings. In 2003, he campaigned for municipal office. As of 2005, Bouteiller is 37 years old, and lives outside of Fergus. He was the GPC's candidate for the 2006 federal election.

Electoral record
Election	Division	Party	Votes	%	Place	Winner
1999 provincial	Waterloo—Wellington	Green	566		5/5	Ted Arnott, Progressive Conservative
2000 federal	Waterloo—Wellington	Green	432	0.96	5/6	Lynn Myers, Liberal
2003 municipal	Council, Centre Wellington, Ward 6	Ind.	95	10.15	3/3	Ron Hallman
2004 federal	Wellington—Halton Hills	Green	2,725	5.43	4/5	Michael Chong, Conservative
2006 federal	Wellington—Halton Hills	Green	3,362	6.10	4/6	Michael Chong, Conservative

(The 2003 municipal result is taken from the Kitchener-Waterloo Record, 12 November 2003, B8. The final official results were not significantly different.)

=== Whitby—Oshawa: Ajay Krishnan ===
Ajay Krishnan was born in India and raised in Kuwait. He moved to Canada with his family at the start of the 1991 Gulf War. Krishnan holds a degree in Engineering Science from the University of Toronto. He is a co-founder and Vice-President of Engineering for Savvica Inc., an e-learning software company. Krishnan was 23 years old during the election, and describes his political background as "centre-right". He received 2,407 votes (3.60%), finishing fourth against Conservative candidate Jim Flaherty.

=== Windsor Tecumseh: Catherine Pluard ===
Catherine Pluard was born in Sarnia Ontario, in 1972. She graduated from Lambton College with a diploma in Early Childhood Education in 2000. Pluard moved to Windsor four years ago to attend university. At the time of the election, she was completing a joint BSW degree program in Social Work and Women's Studies. Pluard also served as a substitute educator at a community day nursery, and was a single mother of an eight-year-old daughter.

Pluard is a community activist who is often involved in women's and environmental issues. In previous years, she had contributed to the organizing of the December 6 memorial vigil, assisted with organizing "Take Back the Night" marches and other consciousness-raising activities. Pluard was a student representative on both the Women's Studies Curriculum Committee and the Women's Studies Advisory Committee. She was also the representative for joint majors in her degree program in both the Social Work Students Association (SWSA) and the Women's Studies Student Association (WSSA).

=== Windsor West: Jillana Bishop ===
Jillana Bishop was born in Windsor, and graduated with Honours from Massey Secondary School (Windsor Star, 19 December 2005). She was 24 years old during the election, and worked as a machine operator at Haas Precision Corporation (Windsor Star, 10 January 2006). Bishop declined to use campaign signs, arguing that they consume resources and pollute the landscape (Star, 9 December 2005). She received 1,444 votes (3.03%), finishing fourth against New Democratic Party incumbent Brian Masse.

== Manitoba ==
=== Mike Johannson (Charleswood—St. James—Assiniboia) ===
Mike Johannson was born in St. James, Manitoba. He is the son of Joan Johannson, an anti-poverty activist and former Green Party of Manitoba candidate, and Robert Johannson, a former Winnipeg city councillor. Johannson worked at New World Technology for five years, and has been a supervisor at Southern Produce since the early 2000s (decade).

According to a Winnipeg Free Press article, Johannson chose to campaign in the 2006 election out of concern for the health of Lake Winnipeg and the Red River. He received 1,700 votes (3.84%), finishing fourth against Conservative incumbent Steven Fletcher.

=== Jeff Fountain (Churchill) ===
Jeff Fountain holds a Bachelor of Science degree in Biology and Environmental Science from the University of Winnipeg. He has worked as an operator trainee with Inco, and previously taught English as a Second Language in Japan (Winnipeg Free Press, 3 January 2006). Fountain has reached nidan rank in Judo and Kendo, is a brown belt in Jujutsu, and teaches wrestling in Thompson.

Fountain received 401 votes (1.61%), finishing fifth against Liberal candidate Tina Keeper.

=== Tanja Hutter (Elmwood—Transcona) ===
Tanja Hutter has a Bachelor of Arts degree in International Relations, Political Science and German from the University of Manitoba, and works as a researcher, writer, editor and web designer. She has been web editor for Canada's National History Society and The Beaver, and was an associate editor for the Encyclopedia of Natural Health. She received 1,211 votes (3.63%), finishing fourth against New Democratic Party incumbent Bill Blaikie.

=== Charlie Howatt (Portage—Lisgar) ===
Charlie Howatt holds an Agriculture degree from the University of Manitoba. He was 25 years old as of the 2006 election, working in a family farm business with his father and grandfather. The family enterprise grows grain and forages, and raises hogs. Howatt has argued that farmers can reverse a recent trend toward rural decline by adopting environmentally sound policies. He is active with the Pembina Soil and Crop Management Association, and often performs as a guitarist.

Howatt defended the Canadian Wheat Board in the 2006 campaign, and criticized the packing industry for profiteering during western Canada's BSE crisis. He received 1,880 votes (5.10%) in 2006, finishing fourth against Conservative incumbent Brian Pallister.

=== Janine Gibson (Provencher) ===
Janine Gibson was educated at the University of Manitoba and the University of Winnipeg, and has worked as an independent organic inspector since 1993. She is president of Canadian Organic Growers, and has worked toward the adoption of a national organic standard for Canada (Winnipeg Free Press, 4 February and 8 June 2004, Globe and Mail, 21 April 2005). Gibson teaches other inspectors through the Independent Organic Inspectors Association.

Gibson lives in a solar and wind-powered village known as Northern Sun Farm Cooperative in southeastern Manitoba, and attracted national attention during the 2005-2006 campaign when she was forced to live without electricity for 22 days in a period of cloudy skies and mild winds. Gibson cited global warming as being responsible for the weather patterns, though she also claims the lack of electricity did not seriously affect her campaign schedule (Broadcast News, 17 January 2006; ).

She supported Tom Manley for the leadership of the Green Party in 2004.

Electoral record
Election	Division	Party	Votes	%	Place	Winner
2004 federal	Provencher	Green	1,100	3.05	4/4	Vic Toews, Conservative
2006 federal	Provencher	Green	1,830	4.77	4/4	Vic Toews, Conservative

=== Marc Payette (St. Boniface) ===
Marc Payette has a Bachelor of Arts degree from the University of Manitoba, and is a graduate of Red River College's Communication Engineering Technology Program. He was employed for many years with Via Rail, and has been a Meteorological Technician for Environment Canada in Saskatchewan, Ontario and the Northwest Territories. Since 1997, Payette has worked as a programmer analyst at St. Boniface College in Winnipeg. He became president of the Manitoba Government and General Employees Union Local 147 in January 2003, and has volunteered for Festival du Voyageur, the Winnipeg Folk Festival and Big Brothers Big Sisters of Winnipeg. The 2006 election was his second as a candidate.

In 2002, Payette wrote a Letter to the Editor in the Winnipeg Free Press endorsing wind power and solar power as energy sources (WFP, 4 July 2002).

Electoral record
Election	Division	Party	Votes	%	Place	Winner
2004 federal	Portage—Lisgar	Green	856	2.46	5/6	Brian Pallister, Conservative
2006 federal	St. Boniface	Green	1,640		4/5	Raymond Simard, Liberal

=== David Michael Carey (Winnipeg North) ===
David Michael Carey has served in the Canadian military, and holds diploma certification as a welder/fitter and an aircraft maintenance engineer. He moved to Manitoba from Ontario in the early 2000s, and worked for Air Canada at the time of the election (Winnipeg Free Press, 2 January 2006). Carey was planning to build an "eco-friendly rammed-earth tire home" in 2006. He received 779 votes (2.86%), finishing fourth against New Democratic Party incumbent Judy Wasylycia-Leis. He campaigned for the leadership of the Green Party of Manitoba in November 2006, and lost to Andrew Basham.

=== Wesley Owen Whiteside (Winnipeg South) ===
Wesley Owen Whiteside was 26 years old at the time of the election (Winnipeg Sun, 15 January 2006 ); according to a Green Party biography, he has lived in Winnipeg for his entire life. He holds a Bachelor of Arts degree in Politics and Administrative Studies from the University of Winnipeg, and is working toward the completion of a Bachelor of Laws degree from the University of Manitoba as of early 2006. Whiteside plans to article with the Manitoba government after his graduation. He also volunteers with the Royal Canadian Air Cadet Program as an Officer in the Reserves.

Whiteside received 1,289 votes (3.08%), finishing fourth against Conservative Rod Bruinooge.

=== Vere H. Scott (Winnipeg South Centre) ===
Vere H. Scott has studied agriculture at the University of Manitoba, and is a retired wildlife biologist. During the 1980s, he served on the provincial Minister of the Environment's advisory committee concerning mosquito control and other matters. Scott is a veteran environmental activist in Winnipeg, and encouraged composting in the early 1990s. He was a founding member of the Green Party of Manitoba, and has served as the party's policy expert. Scott co-authored the Manitoba Clean Environment Commission's hearings into the City of Winnipeg's polluting sewage collection and treatment system in 2003. In the 2006, he campaign called for cities to stop dumping their sewage (treated or not) into river systems.

Electoral record
Election	Division	Party	Votes	%	Place	Winner
2003 provincial	Lord Roberts	Green	442	6.30	4/5	Diane McGifford, New Democratic Party
2006 federal	Winnipeg South Centre	Green	1,848		4/7	Anita Neville, Liberal

== Saskatchewan ==
=== Rick Barsky (Saskatoon—Rosetown—Biggar) ===
Rick Barsky ran in the federal election of 1993 in Canada for election to the House of Commons of Canada as a candidate for Mel Hurtig's National Party of Canada. He ran again in the federal election of 1997 for the Canadian Action Party, and was a candidate for the Legislative Assembly of Saskatchewan in 1999 for the New Green Alliance.

More recently, Rick was the candidate in Saskatoon-Rosetown-Biggar for the Green Party of Canada in the federal elections of 2004 and 2006.

=== External links ===
- Rick Barsky's biography

=== Don Cameron (Saskatoon—Wanuskewin) ===
Don Cameron was born in northeastern Saskatchewan, and attended the University of Saskatchewan. He moved to Ottawa to accept a job in the federal civil service, and later opened a consulting firm. His campaign emphasized a tax on junk food to combat the rising health care expenditures (Saskatoon Star-Phoenix, 9 January 2006). He received 1,292 votes (3.59%), finishing fourth against Conservative incumbent Maurice Vellacott.

=== Matthew Smith (Souris-Mouse Mountain) ===
In the federal election of 23 January 2006, Matthew Smith stood as the Green Party candidate in the riding of Souris—Moose Mountain Souris—Moose Mountain#Election results. During the campaign, he was able to strongly debate both Rona Ambrose and Ken Dryden. Smith campaign emphasized health care, social services, public housing and building a stronger Canada .Although he was not elected, his participation took place against the backdrop of the Green Party of Canada running a full slate of 308 candidates and securing 1,448 votes (4.5%) vote with a total expense outlay of $516.

Following the campaign, Smith was elected CEO of the Saskatchewan Federal Greens (province-wide federal Green Party organization for Saskatchewan). In that role, he successfully negotiated what is regarded as the best revenue-sharing agreement under the originating-party subsidy system (later repealed by the Stephen Harper government) between the federal party and the local electoral district associations (EDAs). This ensured that EDAs received maximum funding per vote in compliance with the subsidy rules allowing for more control at the riding level, which enabled the greens to increase there results by 50% for the 2008 federal election in Saskatchewan. After the 2008 election, Matthew stopped participating directly in politics.

== Alberta ==
=== Juliet Burgess (Calgary—Nose Hill) ===
At 18 years of age, Juliet Burgess was the youngest candidate running in this election. Burgess is a born and raised Calgarian, an activist and arts worker. She worked with the Rock The Vote youth action committee, spoke for the decriminalization of marijuana and sex work, advocated for more public transit investments in Calgary. Burgess ran the following year in the Alberta Provincial election for the Alberta Greens and has continued to be a social advocate, presently working as a Social Worker with survivors of domestic violence and LGBTQ2S+ populations.

=== Kim Warnke (Calgary Southwest) ===
Kim Warnke is a lifelong resident of Calgary, and was listed as 24 years old at the time of the election. She had six years experience on the Calgary Health Authority, and spent a year on the Emergency Department Advisory board as a representative of Nursing Attendants. Warnke has criticized Canada's First Past The Post electoral system, and rejects the accusation that the Green Party was responsible for vote-splitting on the left in the 2004 federal election.

Warnke argued for expanded mass transit services in the 2004 provincial election. In the 2006 campaign, she argued that Alberta needs to use its oil revenues wisely to benefit future generations, Warnke was quoted as saying, "We don't want Alberta to be without oil like Atlantic Canada without cod" (Calgary Herald, 21 December 2005).

On September 30, 2006, Warnke was elected as Deputy Leader South for the Alberta Greens.

Electoral record
Election	Division	Party	Votes	%	Place	Winner
2004 provincial	Calgary Currie	Green	813		3/5	Dave Taylor, Liberal
2006 federal	Calgary Southwest	Green	4,407	7.68	4/5	Stephen Harper, Conservative

=== Lynn Lau (Edmonton—Sherwood Park) ===
- Lynn Lau campaign webpage

== British Columbia ==
=== Karan Bowyer (Okanagan—Coquihalla) ===
Karan Bowyer is a mother of three who was born and raised in the Kootenays. She graduated from the University of British Columbia and now works for an e-learning company.

- GPC Riding Profile

=== Phil Brienesse(Skeena—Bulkley Valley) ===
Phil Brienesse is a 32 year old retail manager. He has served on the Town of Smithers, British Columbia Planning and Design Committee since 2002 and was a Director of the Smithers Chamber of Commerce between 2004 and 2005.

- GPC Riding Profile

=== Alex Bracewell (Cariboo—Prince George) ===
Alex Bracewell is a politician and eco-tourism businessman in West Chilcotin, near Williams Lake, British Columbia. He was elected Director of Electoral Area "J" in the Cariboo Regional District in 2002, and acclaimed in 2005. Bracewell was born in Williams Lake but raised in nearby Tatlayoko Lake Valley.

- GPC Riding Profile

=== Hilary Crowley (Prince George—Peace River) ===
Crowley is a retired physiotherapist from Prince George, British Columbia. She ran unsuccessfully in the 2000 and 2004 federal elections in this riding.

- GPC Riding Profile

=== Matt Greenwood (Kamloops—Thompson—Cariboo) ===
Matt Greenwood is a 25-year-old university student. He born in Vancouver and raised in Kamloops. Greenwood is working towards a bachelor's degree with a double major in political science and economics, and a minor in philosophy, at Thompson Rivers University. He helped found the Kamloops chapter of the BC Sustainable Energy Association.

- GPC Riding Profile

=== Scott Janzen (Burnaby—New Westminster) ===
Scott Janzen is a Green Party politician in Burnaby, British Columbia, Canada. He graduated from the University of Saskatchewan with degrees in Electrical Engineering and Computer Science.

- Campaign website
- GPC Riding Profile

=== Ariel Lade (Victoria) ===
Ariel Lade (b. 1975 in White Rock) is a Green politician and economist in Victoria, British Columbia, Canada. He has earned a master's degree in economics and philosophy at the London School of Economics and toured Eastern Europe.

Lade majored in economics and political science at University of Victoria. He earned a master's degree in economics and philosophy at the London School of Economics.

- GPC Riding Profile

=== Scott Leyland (British Columbia Southern Interior) ===
Scott Leyland is a 55-year-old physiotherapist from Trail, British Columbia. He also works as a clinical instructor at the University of British Columbia's School of Rehabilitation Sciences.

- GPC Riding Profile

=== Harry Naegel (Okanagan—Shuswap) ===
Harry Naegel is a horticultural consultant/contractor. He ran unsuccessfully in the 1997, 2000 and 2004 federal elections in the Okanagan—Coquihalla riding. Naegel has run in every federal, provincial and municipal election since 1993.

- GPC Riding Profile

=== Clements Verhoeven (Kootenay—Columbia) ===
Clements Verhoeven is a 52-year-old born and raised in London, Ontario. He is a high school teacher in Creston, British Columbia. He is bilingual and a published novelist.

- GPC Riding Profile
