= 2019 York—Simcoe federal by-election =

- February 25, 2019

Riding of York—Simcoe
- Turnout: 20.03% (▼43.23pp)
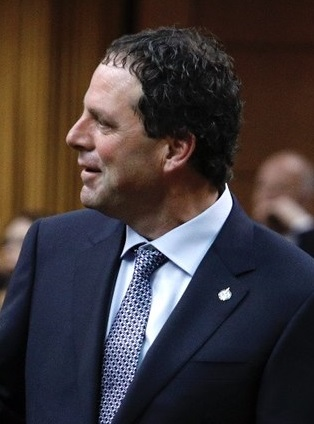
	First party	Second party	Third party
		LPC	NDP
Candidate	Scot Davidson	Shaun Tanaka	Jessa McLean
Party	Conservative	Liberal	New Democratic
Popular vote	8,929	4,811	1,244
Percentage	53.91%	29.04%	7.51%
Swing	▲3.66pp	▼8.72pp	▼1.38pp
MP before election
Peter Van Loan
Conservative
Elected MP
Scot Davidson
Conservative

A by-election was held in the federal riding of York—Simcoe in Ontario on February 25, 2019, following the resignation of incumbent Conservative MP Peter Van Loan. After 15 years in Parliament, the former Leader of the Official Opposition announced that he would resign his seat. The by-election occurred alongside two others; Outremont and Burnaby South.

The seat was held for the Conservatives by Scot Davidson.

== Background ==
=== Constituency ===
York—Simcoe is a rural constituency based in the York Region and Simcoe County, just to the north of the Greater Toronto Area. York—Simcoe has been considered a safe seat for the Conservatives, but at the 2015 election the Liberal Party saw a huge increase in share of vote; 26 percentage points.

=== Representation ===
Peter Van Loan announced on July 29, 2018, that he would be resigning as MP for York—Simcoe effective September 30, 2018. Van Loan has held the seat since the riding's creation in 2004.

== Campaign ==
Scot Davidson, Heather Fullerton, and Jason Verkaik sought the Conservative nomination. In a nomination meeting on October 20, Scot Davidson was declared the Conservative candidate.

Shaun Tanaka, a local professor and the riding's 2015 Liberal candidate, won the Liberal nomination.

In a nomination meeting on December 6, Jessa McLean was acclaimed as the NDP candidate.

The People's Party announced Robert Geurts as their candidate.

Sébastien Corriveau, leader of the Rhinoceros Party, stated his intention to run in this by-election, but he did not register.

The candidate of the Libertarian Party was Keith Komar.

The Speaker's warrant regarding the vacancy was received on October 1, 2018; under the Parliament of Canada Act the writ for a by-election had to be dropped no later than March 30, 2019, 180 days after the Chief Electoral Officer was officially notified of the vacancy via a warrant issued by the Speaker. The by-election was called on January 9, 2019, to be held on February 25, 2019.

== Results ==
Canadian federal by-election, February 25, 2019: York—Simcoe Resignation of Peter Van Loan
Party	Candidate	Votes	%	±%
Conservative	Scot Davidson	8,929	53.91	▲3.66
Liberal	Shaun Tanaka	4,811	29.04	▼8.72
New Democratic	Jessa McLean	1,244	7.51	▼1.38
Progressive Canadian	Dorian Baxter	634	3.83	--
Green	Mathew Lund	451	2.72	▼0.37
People's	Robert Geurts	314	1.90	--
Libertarian	Keith Dean Komar	95	0.57	--
Independent	John The Engineer Turmel	64	0.39	--
National Citizens Alliance	Adam Suhr	22	0.13	--
Total valid votes/expense limit		16,564	99.43	
Total rejected ballots		95	0.57	+0.09
Turnout		16,659	20.03	-43.23
Eligible voters		83,179		
Conservative hold		Swing		+6.19
Source: Elections Canada

== 2015 result ==
2015 Canadian federal election
Party	Candidate	Votes	%	±%	Expenditures
Conservative	Peter Van Loan	24,058	50.25	▼13.42	$138,801.13
Liberal	Shaun Tanaka	18,083	37.77	▲26.43	$62,296.23
New Democratic	Sylvia Gerl	4,255	8.89	▼9.69	$12,736.48
Green	Mark Viitala	1,483	3.1	▼2.26	–
Total valid votes/Expense limit		47,879	100.0		$208,120.39
Total rejected ballots		232	0.48	▲0.08	
Turnout		48,111	63.66	▲5.06	
Eligible voters		75,570			
Source: Elections Canada
