= Kyle Peterson (politician) =

Canadian politician (born 1971)

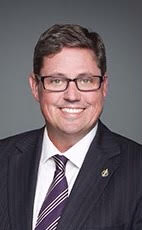

Member of Parliament for Newmarket—Aurora
- In office October 19, 2015 – September 11, 2019
- Preceded by: Lois Brown
- Succeeded by: Tony Van Bynen

Personal details
- Born: March 11, 1971 (age 55)
- Party: Liberal
- Spouse: Andrea
- Education: University of Western Ontario; University of Toronto; Dalhousie University
- Profession: Attorney

Kyle Peterson (born March 11, 1971) is a Canadian politician who served as the member of Parliament for the riding of Newmarket—Aurora from 2015 to 2019 as a member of the Liberal Party.

== Background ==
Peterson did his undergraduate studies at the University of Western Ontario, and graduate studies at the University of Toronto (earning both a master's degree and an MBA from the Rotman School of Management) and Dalhousie University, where he earned a law degree. As a lawyer, he specialized in commercial litigation, and at the time prior to his election was a partner in Affleck Greene McMurtry LLP. As well, he served as the director of the York Region branch of the United Way.

== Federal politics ==
Peterson first ran for the Liberal Party of Canada in the 2011 federal election, losing to incumbent Lois Brown. Running again four years later, he defeated Brown and was elected to the House of Commons.

Peterson said after the 2018 Ontario provincial election that saw the defeat of the provincial Liberal government of Kathleen Wynne, and her resignation as party leader, that he was considering running for the leadership of the Ontario Liberal Party.

Peterson was able to secure passage of his Private Members Motion M-206 to almost unanimous support in the House of Commons. The motion would force the Standing Committee on Health to study the level of fitness and physical activity of youth in Canada. Notice was given on October 29, 2018, and adopted by the House of Commons. The NDP was the only political party to oppose the motion in the House of Commons. The seconder for the motion was MP Robert-Falcon Ouellette a member of the Standing Committee of Health who was able to ensure the motion was respected and studied. Peterson said at the time "that is crazy that the NDP would oppose, who votes against youth and trying to increase physical activity in Canada."

In March 2019, Peterson announced that he would not be running in the 2019 federal election.

== Electoral record ==
2015 Canadian federal election: Newmarket—Aurora
| Party | Candidate | Votes | % | ±% | Expenditures |
|---|---|---|---|---|---|
| Liberal | Kyle Peterson | 25,513 | 45.18% | +21.28% | – |
| Conservative | Lois Brown | 24,059 | 42.60% | −11.69% | – |
| New Democratic | Yvonne Kelly | 4,806 | 8.51% | −6.76% | – |
| Green | Vanessa Long | 1,331 | 2.36% | −2.16% | – |
| Progressive Canadian | Dorian Baxter | 762 | 1.35% | −0.36% | – |
| Total valid votes/Expense limit | | – | 100.0 | | $219,391.75 |
| Total rejected ballots | | – | – | – | |
| Turnout | | 56,471 | 67.95% | – | |
| Eligible voters | | 83,108 | | | |
Source: Elections Canada

2011 Canadian federal election: Newmarket—Aurora
| Party | Candidate | Votes | % | ±% |
|---|---|---|---|---|
| Conservative | Lois Brown | 31,600 | 54.29 | +7.56 |
| Liberal | Kyle Peterson | 13,908 | 23.90 | −10.39 |
| New Democratic | Kassandra Bidarian | 8,886 | 15.27 | +6.80 |
| Green | Vanessa Long | 2,628 | 4.52 | −3.71 |
| Progressive Canadian | Dorian Baxter | 998 | 1.71 | −0.18 |
| Animal Alliance | Yvonne Mackie | 182 | 0.31 | |
| Total valid votes | | 58,202 | 100.00 | |
| Total rejected ballots | | 219 | 0.37 | |
| Turnout | | 58,421 | 64.01 | |
| Eligible voters | | 91,275 | | |
