= York—Simcoe (federal electoral district) =

Federal electoral district in Ontario, Canada

Coordinates: 44.2400°N 79.5415°W

Ontario electoral district
- York—Simcoe in relation to Southern Ontario ridings

Federal electoral district
- Legislature: House of Commons
- District created: 1966
- District abolished: 2023
- First contested: 1968
- Last contested: 2021
- District webpage: profile, map

Demographics
- Population (2011): 94,616
- Electors (2015): 74,911
- Area (km²): 844
- Census division(s): York Region, Simcoe County
- Census subdivision(s): Bradford West Gwillimbury, Chippewas of Georgina Island First Nation, East Gwillimbury, Georgina, King

York—Simcoe is a former federal electoral district in Ontario, Canada, that has been represented in the House of Commons of Canada from 1968 to 1979, from 1988 to 1997, and from 2004 to 2025.

It covers part of the region north of Toronto by Lake Simcoe.

It has existed on three occasions. Its first incarnation was created in 1966 from parts of Dufferin—Simcoe and York North. It existed until 1976 when it was split between York North, Simcoe South, and York—Peel.

It was reformed in 1987 from parts of Simcoe South, York—Peel, Victoria—Haliburton, and Wellington—Dufferin—Simcoe. It was again broken up in 1996 with a split between Barrie—Simcoe, Simcoe—Grey, and York North.

Its current incarnation came into being in 2003 made up of parts of Simcoe—Grey, York North, and Barrie—Simcoe—Bradford.

Its previous member of Parliament was Peter Van Loan, the former Government House Leader. A by-election took place on February 25, 2019.

== Boundaries ==
The riding consists of:

(a) that part of the Regional Municipality of York comprising

(i) the town of Georgina; and

(ii) the Town of East Gwillimbury, excepting that part lying southerly of Green Lane West and Green Lane East and westerly of Highway No. 404;

(iii) that part of the Township of King lying north of Highway No. 9 and Davis Drive West;

(b) Chippewas of Georgina Island First Nation Indian Reserve; and

(c) that part of the County of Simcoe comprising the towns of Bradford West Gwillimbury.

== Demographics ==
According to the 2021 Canadian census

Ethnic groups: 74.1% White, 5.1% South Asian, 4.9% Chinese, 3.0% West Asian, 2.7% Indigenous, 2.5% Black, 2.0% Latin American, 1.5% Southeast Asian, 1.4% Filipino

Languages: 72.7% English, 2.1% Portuguese, 2.0% Russian, 1.9% Mandarin, 1.7% Cantonese, 1.6% Italian, 1.5% Spanish, 1.1% Persian

Religions: 53.2% Christian (26.6% Catholic, 4.2% United Church, 4.0% Anglican, 3.0% Christian Orthodox, 1.3% Presbyterian, 1.2% Baptist), 4.0% Muslim, 2.0% Hindu, 1.3% Buddhist, 1.1% Jewish, 37.2% none

Median income: $43,200 (2020)

Average income: $55,200 (2020)

== History ==
It was originally created in 1966 from parts of Dufferin—Simcoe and York North ridings. It consisted of:

- in the County of Simcoe, the townships of West Gwillimbury, Innisfil and Tecumseth excluding the City of Barrie and the Town of Alliston;
- the Village of Cookstown; and
- in the County of York, the Police Village of Maple, the Village of Stouffville, the Townships of East Gwillimbury, King, Whitchurch and the northern part of the Township of Vaughan lying north of a line drawn from Highway 11 west along Concession 1, south along the road between Concessions 1 and 2, west along County Suburban Road 25, south, west and north along the limit of the Police Village of Maple, west along County Suburban Road 25 to the township boundary.

The electoral district was abolished in 1976 when it was redistributed between Simcoe South, York North and York—Peel ridings.

It was recreated in 1987 from parts of Simcoe South, Victoria—Haliburton, Wellington—Dufferin—Simcoe and York—Peel ridings. The second incarnation of the riding consisted of:

- in the County of Simcoe; the Town of Bradford, the villages of Beeton and Tottenham, and the townships of Adjala, Tecumseth and West Gwillimbury;
- in the Regional Municipality of York: the towns of East Gwillimbury and Newmarket, Georgina Island Indian Reserve No. 33, the Township of Georgina, and the northern part of the Township of King.

The electoral district was abolished in 1996 when it was redistributed between Barrie—Simcoe, Simcoe—Grey and York North ridings.

It was recreated a second time in 2003 from parts of Barrie—Simcoe—Bradford, Simcoe—Grey and York North ridings with the current boundaries as described above.

This riding lost territory to Barrie—Innisfil and Newmarket—Aurora during the 2012 electoral redistribution.

A by-election in the riding took place on February 25, 2019, to replace Peter Van Loan, who retired. The by-election was won by another Conservative, Scot Davidson.

== Members of Parliament ==
This riding has elected the following members of Parliament:

Parliament	Years	Member	Party
York—Simcoe; Riding created from Dufferin—Simcoe and York North
28th	1968–1972	John Roberts	Liberal
29th	1972–1974	Sinclair Stevens	Progressive Conservative
30th	1974–1979	Sinclair Stevens	Progressive Conservative
Riding dissolved into Simcoe South, York North, York—Peel and Wellington—Dufferin—Simcoe
Riding re-created from Simcoe South, Victoria—Haliburton, Wellington—Dufferin—Simcoe and York—Peel
34th	1988–1993	John Cole	Progressive Conservative
35th	1993–1997	Karen Kraft Sloan	Liberal
Riding dissolved into Barrie—Simcoe, Simcoe—Grey and York North
Riding re-created from Barrie—Simcoe—Bradford, Simcoe—Grey and York North
38th	2004–2006	Peter Van Loan	Conservative
39th	2006–2008	Peter Van Loan	Conservative
40th	2008–2011	Peter Van Loan	Conservative
41st	2011–2015	Peter Van Loan	Conservative
42nd	2015–2018	Peter Van Loan	Conservative
42nd	2019–2019	Scot Davidson	Conservative
43rd	2019–2021	Scot Davidson	Conservative
44th	2021–2025	Scot Davidson	Conservative
Riding dissolved into King—Vaughan, New Tecumseth—Gwillimbury, and York—Durham

== Election results ==
=== 2004–present ===
Graph of election results in York—Simcoe (parties that never received 2% of the vote are omitted) View source data.

2021 Canadian federal election
Party	Candidate	Votes	%	±%	Expenditures
Conservative	Scot Davidson	24,900	50.0	+3.7	$63,978.57
Liberal	Daniella Johnson	14,469	29.0	+2.2	$27,041.24
New Democratic	Benjamin Jenkins	6,800	13.6	-0.6	$1,894.25
People's	Michael Lotter	3,662	7.3	+5.7	$2,355.74
Total valid votes/expense limit		49,831	–	–	$121,464.27
Total rejected ballots		466			
Turnout		50,297	53.74		
Eligible voters		93,596			
Source: Elections Canada

2019 Canadian federal election
Party	Candidate	Votes	%	±%	Expenditures
Conservative	Scot Davidson	24,918	46.3	▼7.61	$56,801.81
Liberal	Cynthia Wesley-Esquimaux	14,407	26.8	▼2.24	none listed
New Democratic	Jessa McLean	7,620	14.2	▲6.69	none listed
Green	Jonathan Arnold	4,650	8.6	▲5.58	$6,288.49
Libertarian	Keith Komar	1,311	2.4	▲1.83	none listed
People's	Michael Lotter	875	1.6	▼0.30	$223.47
Total valid votes/expense limit		53,781	100.0		
Total rejected ballots		497			
Turnout		54,278	60.7		
Eligible voters		89,360			
Conservative hold		Swing		▼2.68	
Source: Elections Canada

Canadian federal by-election, February 25, 2019 Resignation of Peter Van Loan
Party	Candidate	Votes	%	±%
Conservative	Scot Davidson	8,929	53.91	▲3.66
Liberal	Shaun Tanaka	4,811	29.04	▼8.72
New Democratic	Jessa McLean	1,244	7.51	▼1.38
Progressive Canadian	Dorian Baxter	634	3.83	--
Green	Mathew Lund	451	2.72	▼0.37
People's	Robert Geurts	314	1.90	--
Libertarian	Keith Dean Komar	95	0.57	--
Independent	John The Engineer Turmel	64	0.39	--
National Citizens Alliance	Adam Suhr	22	0.13	--
Total valid votes/expense limit		16,564	99.43	
Total rejected ballots		95	0.57	+0.09
Turnout		16,659	20.03	-43.23
Eligible voters		83,179		
Conservative hold		Swing		+6.19
Source: Elections Canada

2015 Canadian federal election
Party	Candidate	Votes	%	±%	Expenditures
Conservative	Peter Van Loan	24,058	50.25	▼13.42	$138,801.13
Liberal	Shaun Tanaka	18,083	37.77	▲26.43	$62,296.23
New Democratic	Sylvia Gerl	4,255	8.89	▼9.69	$12,736.48
Green	Mark Viitala	1,483	3.1	▼2.26	–
Total valid votes/expense limit		47,879	100.0		$208,120.39
Total rejected ballots		232	0.48	▲0.08	
Turnout		48,111	63.66	▲5.06	
Eligible voters		75,570			
Source: Elections Canada

2011 federal election redistributed results
Party	Vote	%
Conservative	24,624	63.67
New Democratic	7,187	18.58
Liberal	4,385	11.34
Green	2,073	5.36
Others	408	1.05

2011 Canadian federal election
Party	Candidate	Votes	%	±%	Expenditures
Conservative	Peter Van Loan	33,614	63.6	+6.9	
New Democratic	Sylvia Gerl	10,190	19.3	+7.1	
Liberal	Cynthia Wesley-Esquimaux	5,702	10.8	-7.9	
Green	John Dewar	2,851	5.4	-4.7	
Christian Heritage	Vicki Gunn	352	0.7	-0.2	
United	Paul Pisani	157	0.3	–	
Total valid votes/expense limit		52,866	100.0		
Total rejected ballots		201	0.4	–	
Turnout		53,067	58.6	–	
Eligible voters		90,552	–	–	

2008 Canadian federal election
Party	Candidate	Votes	%	±%	Expenditures
Conservative	Peter Van Loan	27,412	56.7	+8.8	$89,302
Liberal	Judith Moses	9,044	18.7	-12.0	$63,431
New Democratic	Sylvia Gerl	5,882	12.2	-1.1	$7,414
Green	John Dewar	4,887	10.1	+3.2	$10,646
Progressive Canadian	Paul Pisani	676	1.4	–	$5,640
Christian Heritage	Vicki Gunn	444	0.9	-0.2	$7,287
Total valid votes/expense limit		48,345	100.0	$89,500	

2006 Canadian federal election
Party	Candidate	Votes	%	±%
Conservative	Peter Van Loan	25,685	47.9	+2.7
Liberal	Kate Wilson	16,456	30.7	-4.8
New Democratic	Sylvia Gerl	7,139	13.3	+2.1
Green	John Dewar	3,719	6.9	+1.5
Christian Heritage	Vicki Gunn	595	1.1	-0.1
Total valid votes		53,594	100.0	

2004 Canadian federal election
Party	Candidate	Votes	%
Conservative	Peter Van Loan	21,343	45.2
Liberal	Kate Wilson	16,763	35.5
New Democratic	Sylvia Gerl	5,314	11.2
Green	Bob Burrows	2,576	5.5
Progressive Canadian	Stephen Sircelj	670	1.4
Christian Heritage	Vicki Gunn	588	1.2
Total valid votes		47,254	100.0

=== 1988–1997 ===
1993 Canadian federal election
Party	Candidate	Votes	%	±%
Liberal	Karen Kraft Sloan	26,972	38.9	+3.8
Reform	Paul Pivato	22,325	32.2	
Progressive Conservative	John E. Cole	16,139	23.3	-23.9
New Democratic	Steve Pliakes	1,768	2.5	-10.7
Christian Heritage	Ian Knight	958	1.4	-2.5
National	Ronald Fletcher	673	1.0	
Natural Law	Ian Roberts	416	0.6	
Abolitionist	Gary George Brewer	95	0.1	
Total valid votes		69,346	100.0	

1988 Canadian federal election
Party	Candidate	Votes	%
Progressive Conservative	John E. Cole	26,732	47.2
Liberal	Frank Stronach	19,906	35.1
New Democratic	Judy Darcy	7,489	13.2
Christian Heritage	Klass Stel	2,203	3.9
Libertarian	Maureen E. McAleese	335	0.6
Total valid votes		56,665	100.0

=== 1968–1979 ===
1974 Canadian federal election
Party	Candidate	Votes	%	±%
Progressive Conservative	Sinclair Stevens	23,591	47.0	+1.3
Liberal	Mike Willinsky	18,927	37.7	-0.5
New Democratic	Wally Gustar	7,630	15.2	-0.8
Total valid votes		50,148	100.0	

1972 Canadian federal election
Party	Candidate	Votes	%	±%
Progressive Conservative	Sinclair Stevens	22,957	45.7	+8.4
Liberal	John Roberts	19,178	38.2	-7.1
New Democratic	Wally Gustar	8,046	16.0	-1.3
Total valid votes		50,181	100.0	

1968 Canadian federal election
Party	Candidate	Votes	%
Liberal	John Roberts	15,906	45.3
Progressive Conservative	Wallace McCutcheon	13,100	37.3
New Democratic	Don McFadyen	6,095	17.4
Total valid votes		35,101	100.0

== See also ==
- List of Canadian electoral districts
- Historical federal electoral districts of Canada
