= Tecumseth =

Tecumseth may refer to:

- New Tecumseth, a town in Ontario, Canada
- New Tecumseth—Gwillimbury, a proposed electoral district in Ontario
- New Tecumseth Civics, an ice hockey team in Alliston, Ontario

== See also ==
- Tecumseh
