= Standing Joint Committee on Scrutiny of Regulations =

The Standing Joint Committee on the Scrutiny of Regulations (REGS) is a joint committee of the House of Commons of Canada and the Senate of Canada. Its mandate is to examine regulations made by the government of Canada for flaws in legality and execution.

== Studies ==
- Matters of legality and the procedural aspects of government regulations
- The appropriate principles and practices to be observed in creating and using executive regulations and statutes
- Scrutinising the drafting of powers enabling delegates of Parliament to make subordinate laws

== Membership ==
As of the 45th Canadian Parliament:

=== Senate ===
Caucus	Caucus	Province
Independent Senators Group	Yuen Pau Woo, joint chair	BC
Non-affiliated	Patrick Brazeau	QC
Independent Senators Group	Tony Dean	ON
Conservative	Yonah Martin	BC
Progressive Senate Group	Judy White	NL

=== House of Commons ===
Party	Member	District
Conservative	Scot Davidson, joint chair	New Tecumseth—Gwillimbury, ON
Liberal	Ron McKinnon, vice chair	Coquitlam—Port Coquitlam, BC
Bloc Québécois	Xavier Barsalou-Duval, vice chair	Pierre-Boucher—Les Patriotes—Verchères, QC
Conservative	Dalwinder Gill	Calgary McKnight, AB
Conservative	Harb Gill	Windsor West, ON
Liberal	Alana Hirtle	Cumberland—Colchester, NS
Conservative	Michael Kram	Regina—Wascana, SK
Liberal	Chris Malette	Bay of Quinte, ON
Liberal	Giovanna Mingarelli	Prescott—Russell—Cumberland, ON
