= Tony Van Bynen =

Canadian politician (born 1950)

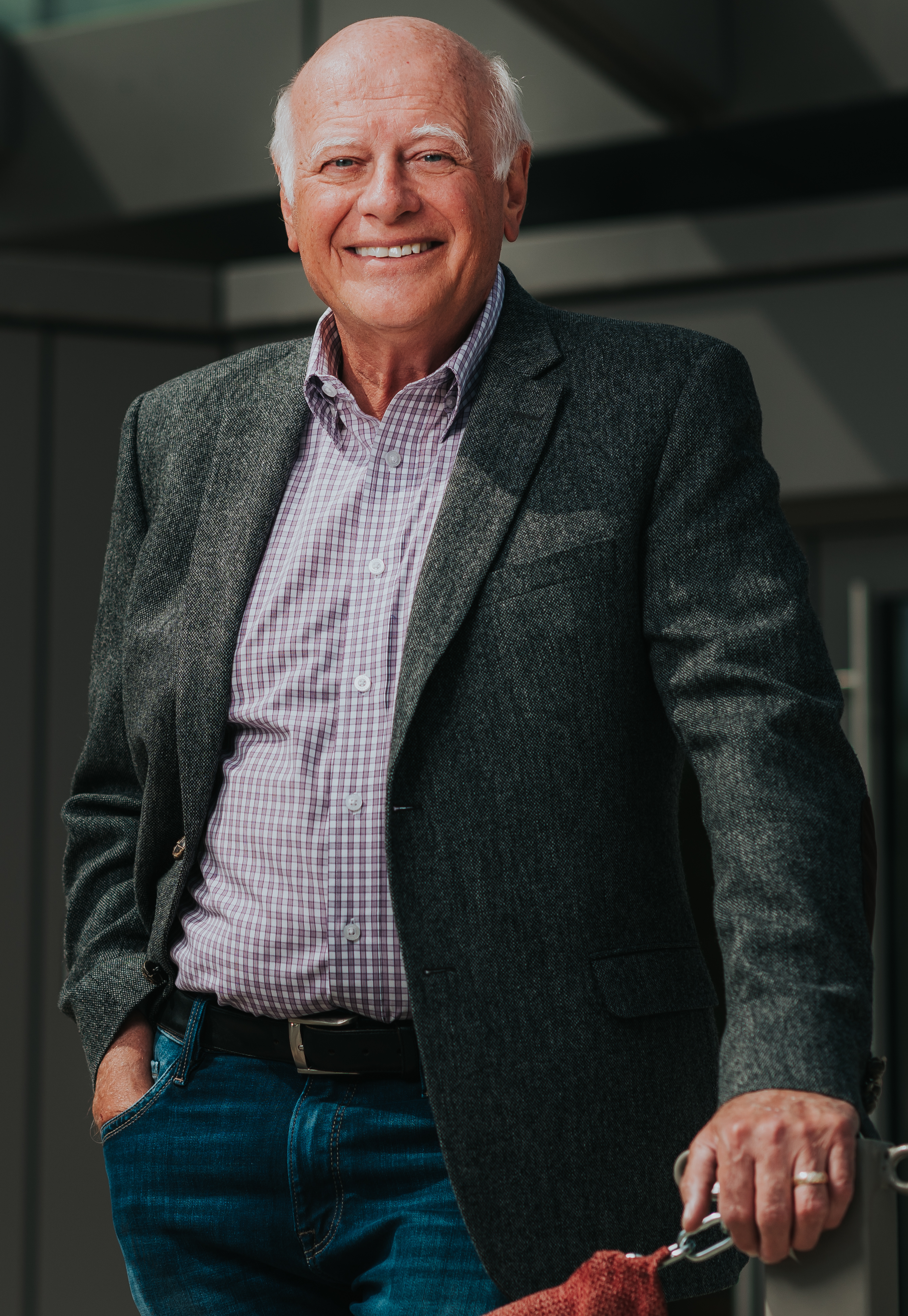

Member of Parliament for Newmarket—Aurora
- In office October 21, 2019 – March 23, 2025
- Preceded by: Kyle Peterson
- Succeeded by: Sandra Cobena

Personal details
- Born: April 5, 1950 (age 76) Netherlands
- Party: Liberal

Tony Van Bynen (born April 5, 1950) is a Dutch-born Canadian politician who served in the House of Commons of Canada for two terms from the 2019 federal election until him standing down in 2025. He represented the district of Newmarket—Aurora as a member of the Liberal Party, and previously served as mayor of Newmarket, Ontario from 2006 to 2018.

== Background ==
Born in the Netherlands, Van Bynen immigrated to Canada in 1952 with his parents, and grew up on a family farm with five brothers and five sisters near London, Ontario. He eventually moved to Newmarket in 1980 after relocating to work as a bank branch manager.

== Municipal politics ==
He entered municipal politics in 2000 when he was elected as a town councillor, then was elected as a regional councillor in 2003 and subsequently as mayor in 2006, defeating his opponent Diane Springstein by 800 votes, a 4.6% margin. He was re-elected in the 2010 election, defeating his only challenger, Michael Cascione. He was again re-elected in the 2014 election.

Van Bynen did not stand for re-election in the 2018 municipal election.

== Federal politics ==
In 2019, Van Bynen became the Liberal Party candidate for the riding of Newmarket—Aurora in the federal election of the same year. He was subsequently elected over former Conservative MP Lois Brown. He was re-elected in the 2021 federal election.

== Community involvement ==
Van Bynen has volunteered at Southlake Hospital and the homeless shelter Inn From The Cold for over a decade with his wife, Roxanne. He also helped to create Belinda's Place, a facility that provides support for homeless and at-risk women in Newmarket.

In 2013, Van Bynen received the Queen Elizabeth II Diamond Jubilee Medal in recognition of his community service and leadership.

== Honours ==
- Queen Elizabeth II Diamond Jubilee Medal

== Electoral record ==
=== Federal ===
2021 Canadian federal election: Newmarket—Aurora
Party	Candidate	Votes	%	±%	Expenditures
Liberal	Tony Van Bynen	24,208	43.8	+0.7	$96,047.56
Conservative	Harold Kim	21,173	38.3	+0.5	$112,882.72
New Democratic	Yvonne Kelly	6,338	11.5	+0.8	$17,822.22
People's	Andre Gagnon	2,296	4.2	+3.2	$3,308.84
Green	Tim Fleming	1,105	1.8	-4.0	$500.00
Independent	Dorian Baxter	260	0.5	-0.9	$1,598.82
Total valid votes		55,290			
Total rejected ballots		372			
Turnout		55,662	60.58		
Eligible voters		91,879			
Source: Elections Canada

2019 Canadian federal election: Newmarket—Aurora
Party	Candidate	Votes	%	±%	Expenditures
Liberal	Tony Van Bynen	26,488	43.1	-2.08	$88,608.07
Conservative	Lois Brown	23,232	37.8	-7.81	$74,278.42
New Democratic	Yvonne Kelly	6,576	10.7	+2.19	$18,620.10
Green	Walter Bauer	3,551	5.8	+3.44	none listed
Progressive Canadian	Dorian Baxter	901	1.5	+0.15	none listed
People's	Andrew McCaughtrie	588	1.0	–	none listed
Rhinoceros	Laurie Goble	104	0.2	–	none listed
Total valid votes/expense limit		61,460	100.0		
Total rejected ballots		424			
Turnout		61,884	67.3		
Eligible voters		91,920			
Liberal hold		Swing		+2.87	
Source: Elections Canada
