= Lois Brown =

Canadian politician

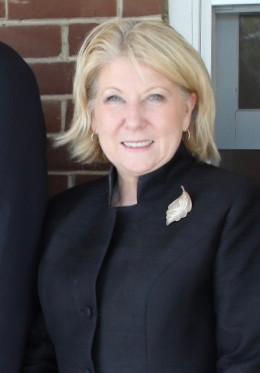

Member of Parliament for Newmarket—Aurora
- In office 14 October 2008 – 4 August 2015
- Preceded by: Belinda Stronach
- Succeeded by: Kyle Peterson

Personal details
- Born: 22 January 1955 (age 71) Stouffville, Ontario
- Party: Conservative
- Other political affiliations: Canadian Alliance
- Profession: Teacher, consultant

Lois E. Brown (born 22 January 1955, in Stouffville, Ontario) is a Canadian businesswoman and politician. She served as the Conservative Member of Parliament (MP) for Newmarket—Aurora from 2008 to 2015.

== Political career ==
Brown is a former member of the Canadian Alliance and was nominated as its candidate for Newmarket—Aurora in advance of the 2004 federal election. When the party merged with the Progressive Conservative Party of Canada, however, Brown lost the Conservative nomination to Belinda Stronach, who went on to defeat Liberal candidate Martha Hall Findlay. Stronach later crossed the floor to the Liberal Party.

Brown was the Conservative nominee in the 2006 federal election, where Stronach defeated her by 4,800 votes.

=== Member of Parliament (2008–2015) ===
In the 2008 election, Brown was the riding's Conservative candidate once again, and this time she won the seat by defeating the new Liberal candidate, Tim Jones, by 6,623 votes. Stronach did not seek re-election and retired from politics.

In January 2011, Brown was appointed to the Red Tape Reduction Commission by Prime Minister Stephen Harper. Harper also appointed her Parliamentary Secretary to the Minister of International Cooperation.

In the 2011 election, Brown resumed her role as Conservative party candidate for the riding. She won a landslide victory over the other five candidates with 54.33% of votes in her riding, defeating the liberal candidate Kyle Peterson by 17,724 votes.

Following her re-election on 2 May 2011, Brown was re-appointed Parliamentary Secretary to the Minister of International Cooperation by Stephen Harper.

Brown sat on the Standing Committee on Foreign Affairs and International Development and she was a member of several Parliamentary Associations, Bilateral Associations, and Interparliamentary Groups.

In the 2015 election, Brown was defeated by Kyle Peterson by a margin of 1,459 votes.

=== 2019 federal election ===
In October 2017, Brown announced that she would be seeking the Conservative nomination for Newmarket—Aurora in an attempt to regain her seat in the 43rd Canadian federal election. She was acclaimed as the candidate in March 2018. She subsequently finished second to the Liberal candidate, Tony Van Bynen.

== Community involvement ==
Brown is an executive member of the Royal Canadian Legion and North Newmarket Lions Club and honorary chair of the Newmarket-Aurora Operation Red Nose volunteer designated driver program since 2009.

== Electoral record ==
2019 Canadian federal election: Newmarket—Aurora
Party	Candidate	Votes	%	±%	Expenditures
Liberal	Tony Van Bynen	26,488	43.1	-2.08	$88,608.07
Conservative	Lois Brown	23,232	37.8	-7.81	$74,278.42
New Democratic	Yvonne Kelly	6,576	10.7	+2.19	$18,620.10
Green	Walter Bauer	3,551	5.8	+3.44	none listed
Progressive Canadian	Dorian Baxter	901	1.5	+0.15	none listed
People's	Andrew McCaughtrie	588	1.0	–	none listed
Rhinoceros	Laurie Goble	104	0.2	–	none listed
Total valid votes/expense limit		61,460	100.0		
Total rejected ballots		424			
Turnout		61,884	67.3		
Eligible voters		91,920			
Liberal hold		Swing		+2.87	
Source: Elections Canada

2015 Canadian federal election: Newmarket—Aurora
Party	Candidate	Votes	%	±%	Expenditures
Liberal	Kyle Peterson	25,508	45.18	+21.47	$84,535.55
Conservative	Lois Brown	24,057	42.61	−11.45	$162,456.63
New Democratic	Yvonne Kelly	4,806	8.51	−7.28	$26,593.85
Green	Vanessa Long	1,331	2.36	−2.03	$2,677.04
Progressive Canadian	Dorian Baxter	762	1.35		$3,282.89
Total valid votes/Expense limit		56,464	100.00		$219,830.00
Total rejected ballots		257	0.45	–	
Turnout		56,721	68.25	–	
Eligible voters		83,108			
Liberal gain from Conservative		Swing		+16.46	
Source: Elections Canada

2011 Canadian federal election: Newmarket—Aurora
Party	Candidate	Votes	%	±%
Conservative	Lois Brown	31,600	54.29	+7.56
Liberal	Kyle Peterson	13,908	23.90	−10.39
New Democratic	Kassandra Bidarian	8,886	15.27	+6.80
Green	Vanessa Long	2,628	4.52	−3.71
Progressive Canadian	Dorian Baxter	998	1.71	−0.18
Animal Alliance	Yvonne Mackie	182	0.31	
Total valid votes		58,202	100.00	
Total rejected ballots		219	0.37	
Turnout		58,421	64.01	
Eligible voters		91,275		

2008 Canadian federal election: Newmarket—Aurora
Party	Candidate	Votes	%	±%
Conservative	Lois Brown	24,873	46.73	+8.68
Liberal	Tim Jones	18,250	34.29	−11.93
New Democratic	Mike Seaward	4,508	8.47	−1.12
Green	Glenn Hubbers	4,381	8.23	+3.46
Progressive Canadian	Dorian Baxter	1,004	1.89	+0.65
Christian Heritage	Ray Luff	211	0.40	

2006 Canadian federal election: Newmarket—Aurora
Party	Candidate	Votes	%	±%
Liberal	Belinda Stronach	27,176	46.22	+5.14
Conservative	Lois Brown	22,371	38.05	−4.37
New Democratic	Ed Chudak	5,639	9.59	−0.34
Green	Glenn Hubbers	2,805	4.77	+0.30
Progressive Canadian	Dorian Baxter	729	1.24	−0.86
Canadian Action	Peter Maloney	79	0.13	
