= Scot Davidson =

Canadian politician

Scot Davidson MP
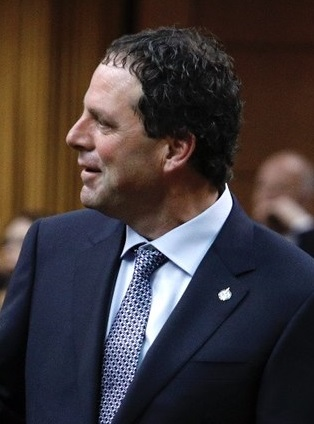

Member of Parliament for York—South Simcoe York—Simcoe (2019–2025) New Tecumseth—Gwillimbury (2025–2026)
- Incumbent
- Assumed office February 25, 2019
- Preceded by: Peter Van Loan

Personal details
- Born: Georgina, Ontario
- Party: Conservative
- Education: York University

Scot Davidson is a Canadian politician who has served as the member of Parliament for the riding of York—South Simcoe as a member of the Conservative Party of Canada since 2019.

== Background ==
Davidson was born in Georgina, Ontario. He holds a bachelor's degree in economics from York University.

== Political career ==
On October 20, 2018, Davidson won the Conservative nomination for the 2019 York—Simcoe federal by-election, which was held to fill the seat vacated by Peter Van Loan’s retirement. Davidson won the seat in the by-election, and retained it in the general election in October. He was re-elected in the 2021 and 2025 elections. He was elected joint chair of the Standing Joint Committee on Scrutiny of Regulations in the 45th Canadian Parliament in 2025.

== Electoral record ==
2025 Canadian federal election: New Tecumseth—Gwillimbury
Party	Candidate	Votes	%	±%
Conservative	Scot Davidson	39,247	59.35	+11.68
Liberal	Mike Hanrahan	24,444	36.97	+6.70
New Democratic	Nancy Morrison	1,226	1.85	–11.20
Green	Callum McKinnon	712	1.08	–0.16
People's	Paul Montague	496	0.75	–6.74
Total valid votes		66,125	99.34	
Total rejected ballots		442	0.66	-0.15
Turnout		66,567	68.45	+11.43
Eligible voters		97,255		
Conservative notional hold		Swing		+2.49
Source: Elections Canada

2021 Canadian federal election: York—Simcoe
Party	Candidate	Votes	%	±%
Conservative	Scot Davidson	24,900	50.0	+3.7
Liberal	Daniella Johnson	14,469	29.0	+2.2
New Democratic	Benjamin Jenkins	6,800	13.6	-0.6
People's	Michael Lotter	3,662	7.3	+5.7
Total valid votes		49,831		
Total rejected ballots		466		
Turnout		50,297	53.74	
Eligible voters		93,596		
Source: Elections Canada

2019 Canadian federal election: York—Simcoe
Party	Candidate	Votes	%	±%	Expenditures
Conservative	Scot Davidson	24,918	46.3	▼7.61	$56,801.81
Liberal	Cynthia Wesley-Esquimaux	14,407	26.8	▼2.24	none listed
New Democratic	Jessa McLean	7,620	14.2	▲6.69	none listed
Green	Jonathan Arnold	4,650	8.6	▲5.58	$6,288.49
Libertarian	Keith Komar	1,311	2.4	▲1.83	none listed
People's	Michael Lotter	875	1.6	▼0.30	$223.47
Total valid votes/expense limit		53,781	100.0		
Total rejected ballots		497			
Turnout		54,278	60.7		
Eligible voters		89,360			
Conservative hold		Swing		▼2.68	
Source: Elections Canada

Canadian federal by-election, February 25, 2019: York—Simcoe Resignation of Peter Van Loan
Party	Candidate	Votes	%	±%
Conservative	Scot Davidson	8,929	53.91	▲3.66
Liberal	Shaun Tanaka	4,811	29.04	▼8.72
New Democratic	Jessa McLean	1,244	7.51	▼1.38
Progressive Canadian	Dorian Baxter	634	3.83	--
Green	Mathew Lund	451	2.72	▼0.37
People's	Robert Geurts	314	1.90	--
Libertarian	Keith Dean Komar	95	0.57	--
Independent	John The Engineer Turmel	64	0.39	--
National Citizens Alliance	Adam Suhr	22	0.13	--
Total valid votes/expense limit		16,564	99.43	
Total rejected ballots		95	0.57	+0.09
Turnout		16,659	20.03	-43.23
Eligible voters		83,179		
Conservative hold		Swing		+6.19
Source: Elections Canada
