= Peter Van Loan =

Canadian politician (born 1963)

The Honourable Peter Van Loan PC KC
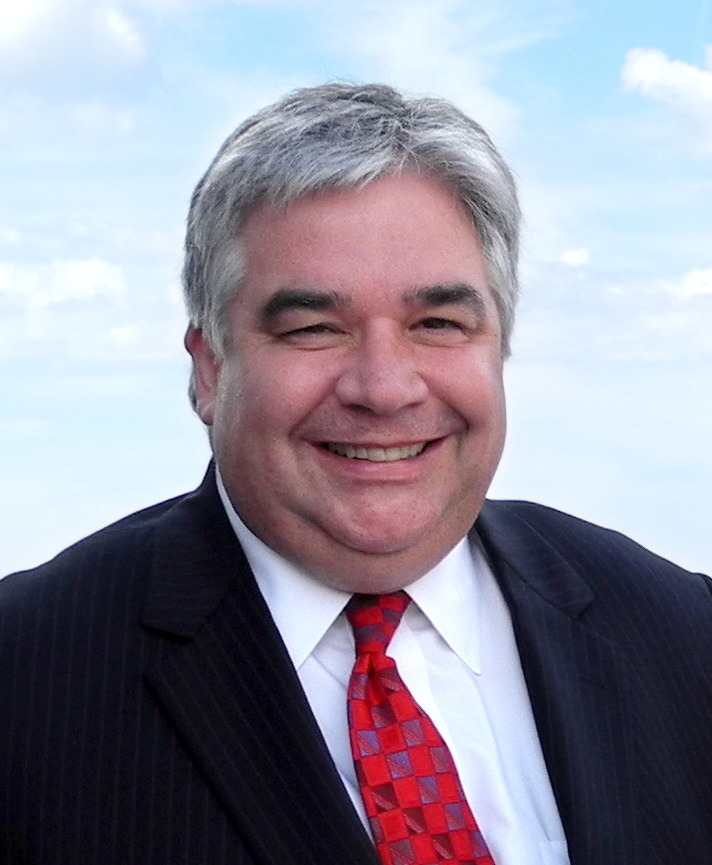
- Van Loan in 2014

Shadow Minister of Canadian Heritage
- In office 20 November 2015 – 7 September 2018
- Leader: Rona Ambrose
- Preceded by: Pierre Nantel
- Succeeded by: Steven Blaney

Leader of the Government in the House of Commons
- In office May 18, 2011 – November 4, 2015
- Prime Minister: Stephen Harper
- Preceded by: John Baird
- Succeeded by: Dominic LeBlanc
- In office January 4, 2007 – October 30, 2008
- Prime Minister: Stephen Harper
- Preceded by: Rob Nicholson
- Succeeded by: Jay Hill

Minister of International Trade
- In office January 19, 2010 – May 18, 2011
- Prime Minister: Stephen Harper
- Preceded by: Stockwell Day
- Succeeded by: Ed Fast

Minister of Public Safety
- In office October 30, 2008 – January 19, 2010
- Prime Minister: Stephen Harper
- Preceded by: Stockwell Day
- Succeeded by: Vic Toews

President of the Queen's Privy Council Minister of Intergovernmental Affairs
- In office November 27, 2006 – January 4, 2007
- Prime Minister: Stephen Harper
- Preceded by: Michael Chong
- Succeeded by: Rona Ambrose

Member of Parliament for York—Simcoe
- In office June 28, 2004 – September 30, 2018
- Preceded by: Riding established
- Succeeded by: Scot Davidson

Personal details
- Born: April 18, 1963 (age 63) Niagara Falls, Ontario, Canada
- Party: Conservative
- Children: 2
- Profession: Lawyer

Peter Leo Van Loan (born April 18, 1963) is a former Canadian politician who served as the member of Parliament (MP) for the electoral district of York—Simcoe from 2004 to 2018. A Conservative, he was the Leader of the Government in the House of Commons from 2007 to 2008 and again from 2011 to 2015.

== Biography ==
Born in Niagara Falls, Ontario, Van Loan is of Estonian heritage on his maternal side. His mother and grandparents fled Estonia during World War II and immigrated to Canada.

Van Loan was educated at the University of Toronto and York University and holds a bachelor's degree, a Masters in International Relations and an additional master's degree in geography. Van Loan graduated from York University's Osgoode Hall Law School and was admitted to the Bar of Ontario in 1989.

Prior to his election to public office, Van Loan was a partner and Chair of the Planning and Development Law Group at the law firm of Fraser Milner Casgrain LLP in Toronto, Ontario. Van Loan was also an adjunct professor of planning at the University of Toronto. He served as president of the Progressive Conservative Party of Ontario during Mike Harris' term of office and then of the Progressive Conservative Party of Canada for a brief period. He resigned from the latter post in 2000 after a series of disagreements with its leader, Joe Clark.

Van Loan was a key figure in the unsuccessful attempt to convince Premier of New Brunswick Bernard Lord to run for the leadership of the federal Progressive Conservatives in late 2002. He was a key organizer in the "Yes" Campaign, led by Tory Leader Peter MacKay, to ratify the merger of the Progressive Conservative Party and the Canadian Alliance into the Conservative Party of Canada. Van Loan then again attempted to recruit Lord to run for the leadership of the new party, and again was unsuccessful.

In an article from January 24, 2008, Van Loan was classified as one of "Harper's 12", the twelve most influential people in Ottawa, by Maclean's Magazine. Other cabinet ministers included were Jim Prentice, John Baird, and Jim Flaherty.

On October 30, 2008, Jay Hill replaced Van Loan as Government House Leader and Steven John Fletcher took over the Minister for Democratic Reform post. Van Loan became the Minister for Public Safety, as Stockwell Day became the Minister of International Trade. On these changes, Don Martin wrote: "The House of Commons might become a slightly friendlier place now that Peter Van Loan has lost the job of Question Period cheap shot specialist to become Public Safety Minister, a good move that seems to back Harper's pledge to play nice with others during the upcoming session."

On January 19, 2010, Harper appointed Van Loan as Minister of International Trade.

On December 5, 2012, on the floor of the House of Commons Van Loan was involved in an altercation with NDP Leader Tom Mulcair. Van Loan crossed the aisle and used an inappropriate word during the confrontation. He was restrained by Defence Minister Peter MacKay.

Van Loan was one of thirteen Canadians banned from travelling to Russia under retaliatory sanctions imposed by Russian president Vladimir Putin in March 2014. In response to the ban, Van Loan said that the ban was "not of serious consequence" and that he would "not be losing sleep over being on the list."

On July 29, 2018, Van Loan announced that he would be retiring from politics. He retired from the House of Commons on September 30. In the by-election, his seat was held for the Conservatives by Scot Davidson.

== Electoral record ==
2004 Canadian federal election
Party	Candidate	Votes	%
Conservative	Peter Van Loan	21,343	45.2
Liberal	Kate Wilson	16,763	35.5
New Democratic	Sylvia Gerl	5,314	11.2
Green	Bob Burrows	2,576	5.5
Progressive Canadian	Stephen Sircelj	670	1.4
Christian Heritage	Vicki Gunn	588	1.2
Total valid votes		47,254	100.0

2006 Canadian federal election
Party	Candidate	Votes	%	±%
Conservative	Peter Van Loan	25,685	47.9	+2.7
Liberal	Kate Wilson	16,456	30.7	-4.8
New Democratic	Sylvia Gerl	7,139	13.3	+2.1
Green	John Dewar	3,719	6.9	+1.5
Christian Heritage	Vicki Gunn	595	1.1	-0.1
Total valid votes		53,594	100.0	

2008 Canadian federal election
Party	Candidate	Votes	%	±%	Expenditures
Conservative	Peter Van Loan	27,412	56.7	+8.8	$89,302
Liberal	Judith Moses	9,044	18.7	-12.0	$63,431
New Democratic	Sylvia Gerl	5,882	12.2	-1.1	$7,414
Green	John Dewar	4,887	10.1	+3.2	$10,646
Progressive Canadian	Paul Pisani	676	1.4	–	$5,640
Christian Heritage	Vicki Gunn	444	0.9	-0.2	$7,287
Total valid votes/Expense limit		48,345	100.0	$89,500	

2011 Canadian federal election: York—Simcoe
Party	Candidate	Votes	%	±%	Expenditures
Conservative	Peter Van Loan	33,614	63.6	+6.9	
New Democratic	Sylvia Gerl	10,190	19.3	+7.1	
Liberal	Cynthia Wesley-Esquimaux	5,702	10.8	-7.9	
Green	John Dewar	2,851	5.4	-4.7	
Christian Heritage	Vicki Gunn	352	0.7	-0.2	
United	Paul Pisani	157	0.3	–	
Total valid votes/expense limit		52,866	100.0		
Total rejected ballots		201	0.4	–	
Turnout		53,067	58.6	–	
Eligible voters		90,552	–	–	

2015 Canadian federal election
Party	Candidate	Votes	%	±%	Expenditures
Conservative	Peter Van Loan	24,058	50.25	▼13.42	$138,801.13
Liberal	Shaun Tanaka	18,083	37.77	▲26.43	$62,296.23
New Democratic	Sylvia Gerl	4,255	8.89	▼9.69	$12,736.48
Green	Mark Viitala	1,483	3.1	▼2.26	–
Total valid votes/Expense limit		47,879	100.0		$208,120.39
Total rejected ballots		232	0.48	▲0.08	
Turnout		48,111	63.66	▲5.06	
Eligible voters		75,570			
Source: Elections Canada

28th Canadian Ministry (2006–2015) – Cabinet of Stephen Harper
Cabinet posts (5)
Predecessor	Office	Successor
Stockwell Day	Minister of International Trade; 2010–2011 styled as Minister of International Trade	Edward Fast
Stockwell Day	Minister of Public Safety; 2008–2010 styled as Minister of Public Safety	Vic Toews
Rob Nicholson	Minister of State; 2007–2008 styled as Leader of the Government in the House of Commons	Jay Hill
Michael Chong	President of the Queen's Privy Council for Canada; 2006–2007	Rona Ambrose
Michael Chong	Minister of Intergovernmental Affairs; 2006–2007	Rona Ambrose
Special Cabinet Responsibilities
Predecessor	Title	Successor
Rob Nicholson	Minister responsible for Democratic Reform; 2007–2008	Steven John Fletcher
Michael Chong	Minister for Sport; 2006–2007	Helena Guergis as Secretary of State for Sport
Special Parliamentary Responsibilities
Predecessor	Title	Successor
John Baird	Leader of the Government in the House of Commons; 2007–2008, 2011–2015	Dominic LeBlanc
Parliament of Canada
Preceded by Riding created in 2004	Member of Parliament for York-Simcoe; 2004–2018	Succeeded by Scot Davidson
