= Karen Kraft Sloan =

Canadian politician

Member of the Canadian Parliament for York—Simcoe
- In office 1993–1997
- Preceded by: John Cole
- Succeeded by: Riding dissolved

Member of the Canadian Parliament for York North
- In office 1997–2004
- Preceded by: Maurizio Bevilacqua
- Succeeded by: Riding dissolved

Personal details
- Born: 3 April 1952 (age 74) Kitchener, Ontario, Canada
- Party: Liberal
- Committees: Chair, Subcommittee on Environmental Awareness for Sustainability of the Standing Committee on Environment and Sustainable Development (1994–1997)
- Portfolio: Parliamentary Secretary to the Minister of the Environment (1996–1998)

Karen Kraft Sloan (born 3 April 1952) is a former Canadian politician who served as a Liberal member of the House of Commons of Canada from 1993 to 2004. By career, she is a teacher and consultant.

Born in Kitchener, Ontario, Sloan first won election to Parliament for the York—Simcoe electoral district during the 1993 federal election. The 1997 and 2000 general elections saw her return to Parliament in the York North riding, which was formed after a restructuring of electoral district boundaries. Sloan thus served in the 35th, 36th, and 37th Canadian Parliaments.

After retiring from politics in 2004, she was appointed as Canada's Ambassador for the Environment on 16 February 2005. The appointment was announced by Stéphane Dion and Pierre Pettigrew who were respectively the Canadian Ministers of Environment and Foreign Affairs at the time.

== Education ==
- 1977: Bachelor of Arts (BA): University of Windsor
- 1982: Bachelor of Administrative Studies (BAdmin): Brock University
- 1990: Master of Environmental Studies (MES): York University

== Electoral record ==
1997 Canadian federal election: York North
Party	Candidate	Votes
Liberal	Karen Kraft Sloan	22,942
Reform	Shauneen MacKay	13,245
Progressive Conservative	John Cole	11,308
New Democratic	Laurie Cooke	1,996
Christian Heritage	Ian Knight	799
Canadian Action	JeweEl McKenzie	220
Natural Law	Mary Wan	187

2000 Canadian federal election: York North
Party	Candidate	Votes
Liberal	Karen Kraft Sloan	22,665
Alliance	Bob Yaciuk	11,985
Progressive Conservative	Joe Wamback	11,890
New Democratic	Ian Scott	1,696
Independent	Ian Knight	509
