= John Cole (Canadian politician) =

Canadian politician

John E. Cole

Member of Parliament for York—Simcoe
- In office 1988–1993
- Preceded by: Riding established
- Succeeded by: Karen Kraft Sloan

Personal details
- Born: 4 August 1942 (age 83) Toronto, Ontario
- Party: Progressive Conservative
- Profession: optometrist

John E. Cole (born 4 August 1942) was a Progressive Conservative party member of the House of Commons of Canada. He was an optometrist by career.

He represented the Ontario riding of York—Simcoe where he was elected in the 1988 federal election and served in the 34th Canadian Parliament. Cole left federal politics in the 1993 federal election after his loss to Karen Kraft Sloan of the Liberal party.

== Electoral results ==
1993 Canadian federal election: York—Simcoe
Party	Candidate	Votes	%	±%
Liberal	Karen Kraft Sloan	26,972	38.9	+3.8
Reform	Paul Pivato	22,325	32.2	
Progressive Conservative	John E. Cole	16,139	23.3	-23.9
New Democratic	Steve Pliakes	1,768	2.5	-10.7
Christian Heritage	Ian Knight	958	1.4	-2.5
National	Ronald Fletcher	673	1.0	
Natural Law	Ian Roberts	416	0.6	
Abolitionist	Gary George Brewer	95	0.1	
Total valid votes		69,346	100.0	

1988 Canadian federal election: York—Simcoe
Party	Candidate	Votes	%
Progressive Conservative	John E. Cole	26,732	47.2
Liberal	Frank Stronach	19,906	35.1
New Democratic	Judy Darcy	7,489	13.2
Christian Heritage	Klass Stel	2,203	3.9
Libertarian	Maureen E. McAleese	335	0.6
Total valid votes		56,665	100.0
