= Progressive Canadian Party candidates in the 2006 Canadian federal election =

The Progressive Canadian Party fielded several candidates in the 2006 federal election, none of whom were elected. Information about these candidates may be found on this page.

== Quebec ==
=== Outremont: Philip Paynter ===
Philip Paynter was a political science and economics student at Concordia University in 2006. He received 94 votes (0.23%), finishing seventh against incumbent Liberal cabinet minister Jean Lapierre.

== Ontario ==
=== Beaches—East York: Jim Love ===
Love was born on February 24, 1956, in Port Arthur, Ontario. He holds a Bachelor of Arts degree in English from York University, and is now a management consultant in Toronto. He is a managing partner in Performance Advantage, and also works with Innovate Inc. in the Kitchener-Waterloo area. Love is a member of the Canadian Association of Management Consultants, and was awarded his Fellowship as a Certified Management Consultant (FCMC) in 2007 in recognition of his contributions to management consulting and his long record of community service. Formerly, Love was a vice-president of the DMR group from 1997 to 2003 and prior to that a Principal with Ernst & Young. He is also a musician, and received a Juno nomination for an album he recorded with the group Sphere. He also has a gold record for the children's music hit song "Sharing".

Love joined the Progressive Conservative Party of Canada in 1995, and became president of its Beaches—East York association. Love opposed the Progressive Conservative Party's merger with the Canadian Alliance in 2003-2004, and following the merger became one of 100 Progressive Conservatives to form the Progressive Canadian Party. He was an organizer for the new party in the 2004 election, and became party president in 2005 by a unanimous vote of the national council. He also chaired the party's National Election Campaign in the 2006. Love has argued that the Progressive Conservative Party's merger with the Alliance was conducted to purge the party of David Orchard's growing influence, rather than to "unite the right" in Canada (Toronto Star, 12 November 2005).

He received 183 votes (0.36%) in 2006, finishing fifth against Liberal incumbent Maria Minna.

=== Lanark—Frontenac—Lennox and Addington: Jeffrey Bogaerts ===
Bogaerts has worked in Information Technology since 1978, and is the president of J.D. Bogaerts Enterprises Inc. He has produced products for the provincial and federal governments, for NATO, and for private companies.

He campaigned for the Lanark—Carleton Progressive Conservative nomination in 2003, shortly before the party's merger with the Canadian Alliance (Ottawa Citizen, 25 June 2003). Bogaerts supported the rights of local farmers who were shooting overpopulated deer herds that threatened area property, despite legal prohibitions against their actions (Kingston Whig-Standard, 16 June 2003).

Bogaerts's 2006 campaign website featured a prominent image of Sir John A. Macdonald, who represented the area during the 1880s. Like his Conservative Party opponent, he called for the entrenchment of property rights in the Canadian Constitution. He received 735 votes (1.24%) in 2006, finishing fifth against Conservative incumbent Scott Reid.

=== Sudbury: Stephen Butcher ===
Stephen L. Butcher is a graduate of the Aerospace Engineering Technology program at Ryerson University (now Toronto Metropolitan University). He has worked at the Sudbury Neutrino Observatory, and operates Mid-North Water Purification and Pumps. Butcher helped organize a Neighbourhood Watch program in the community of Copper Cliff, and is active with police and aviation issues.

Butcher was a member of the centre-right Progressive Conservative Party of Canada before that party merged with the more right-wing Canadian Alliance to create the Conservative Party of Canada in 2003. He originally supported the merger, and was a candidate for the party in the 2004 federal election. He attracted some controversy during this campaign for saying that Canada should exercise caution when bringing "foreign doctors" into Canada. Butcher later clarified that he believed it was inappropriate for Canada to entice doctors to emigrate from medically underserviced areas in the global south. Some took issue with his comments, arguing that Canada's medical system would collapse without doctors from other countries.

Butcher intended to seek the Conservative nomination again for the 2006 election, but withdrew shortly before the vote. The nomination was won by Kevin Serviss. Butcher subsequently left the Conservative Party, charging that Serviss was a special-interest candidate who should not have been permitted to seek the nomination. He also argued that the Conservative Party was drifting too far to the right under Stephen Harper's leadership, and would pursue a socially conservative agenda if it came to power. He chose to run for the Progressive Canadian Party instead. In an interview with the Sudbury Star during this election, he cited Pierre Trudeau as his favourite Canadian politician.

Electoral record
Election	Division	Party	Votes	%	Place	Winner
1997 municipal	Mayor of Walden	n/a	not listed	not listed	3/?	Dick Johnstone
2000 municipal	Rainbow District School Board, Area 1	n/a	598	11.73	3/3	Gord Santala
2004 federal	Sudbury	Conservative	9,008	21.05	3/5	Diane Marleau, Liberal
2006 municipal	Greater Sudbury municipal council, Ward 2	n/a	223	4.34	4/5	Jacques Barbeau
2006 federal	Sudbury	Progressive Canadian	782	1.64	5/8	Diane Marleau, Liberal

=== Windsor West: Chris Schnurr ===
Schnurr (born in Wingham, Ontario) is the assistant to the Director of Development and Stewardship Officer of University Advancement at the University of Windsor (Windsor Star, 1 October 2005) He also operates a graphic design business. A former member of the Progressive Conservative Party of Canada, he describes himself as fiscally conservative and socially moderate (Windsor Star, 6 January 2006).

He has called for greater AIDS/HIV awareness in the Windsor gay community (Star, 7 December 2004). Before joining the Progressive Canadian Party, he planned to vote for the Liberals in the 2006 election because of concerns about the Conservative Party's social policies (Star, 19 April 2005). In 1999, he organized the first gay pride parade in Sarnia (Globe and Mail, 23 August 1999).

In 2005, Schnurr wrote a Letter to the Editor supporting the energy policies of the former provincial government of Mike Harris, which required energy consumers to pay the real cost of electricity. Schnurr argued that the policy encouraged conservation, and criticized the succeeding governments of Ernie Eves and Dalton McGuinty for supporting artificially lower rates (Star, 10 August 2005). He has also called upon the government to address rising gas prices, otherwise they could be faced with a renewed demand for the nationalization of the oil industry (Star, 14 September 2005).

Schnurr has argued against affirmative action policies for universities, describing such policies as reverse discrimination (Star, 7 April 2003). He was an opponent of the 2003 Invasion of Iraq (Star, 13 December 2002).

He was a candidate for city council for the City of Windsor municipal election in November 2006 .

He received 614 votes (1.29%), finished fifth out of seven against New Democratic Party incumbent Brian Masse during the 2006 federal election.

Chris Schnurr resigned from the Progressive Canadian Party as their Communications Director and Health Critic, along with President Jim Love and Leader Tracy Parsons in November 2007.

=== Markham—Unionville: Fayaz Choudhary ===
M. Fayaz Choudhary is a Creative/Futuristic minded small business man who started his first business while still in school (22 years ago) and continues run his thriving business in greater Toronto

Born Pakistan, Fayaz chose Canada as the land of opportunity and freedom to call home for himself and his family. He and his wife of 13 years, Tayyaba, are the parents of twin boys, Munam and Afraz, and two daughters, Samahat and Sabahat.

Starting with a degree in Science from the University of Karachi, Pakistan, His love of learning has earned him additional skills in various fields of computers and electronics.

Using that knowledge, Fayaz Choudhary became a Local Radio producer on 770AM running state of the Art web radios and web TV. He is also the founder of first Urdu community web radio in Canada.

An active member of the community, Fayaz’s love of learning and youth inspired him to create and finance the “Munam’s scientific inventor’s award 1993, 1994, and 1995” for teens

Fayaz Choudhary is committed to support the needs of other hard working Canadians because he believes that any man who works hard enough could aspire to any job in a country of opportunity like Canada.

A man who delights in helping others, Fayaz Choudhary characterizes this opportunity to serve by running as a candidate with a simple slogan. “We will build our future together!”
