= Dorian Baxter =

Canadian bishop

His Grace Dorian Arthur Baxter
- The Federation of Independent Anglican Churches of North America

Orders
- Ordination: 15 May 1983
- Consecration: 9 March 2003

Personal details
- Born: Dorian Baxter; 3 April 1950 (age 76) Mombasa Island, Kenya
- Children: 2
- Education: York University, University of Toronto

Dorian Baxter (born 3 April 1950) is a Canadian religious minister and musician and a perennial candidate for political office in Newmarket, Ontario, Canada. He was consecrated as a bishop in the Federation of Independent Anglican Churches in 2003.

== Ministry ==
In 1996, Baxter began incorporating the music and look of Elvis Presley into his services. That year, he won the Canadian Showstopper at the Collingwood Elvis Festival. In 1997 he won the Grand Champion of Showstoppers at that same festival. After that year, festival founder Billy Cann was ousted and control given to the town's business groups, a decision which Baxter objected to before Collingwood Town Council. Baxter joined Cann to establish a competing Elvis festival in Orillia and refused to return to the Collingwood festival.

In 2002, the church revoked his invitation to be the keynote preacher at a Masonic service in a Toronto Anglican church (although he did eventually attend). Baxter has said he found this particularly difficult, as he has been a Freemason for more than 25 years.

In 2003, he set up an independent church, Christ the King Graceland Independent Anglican Church of Canada, in Newmarket, Ontario, where he continues to conduct services using Presley's music, with his signature Elvis pompadour and sideburns. Baxter was consecrated on 9 March 2003 in Newmarket by the Rt. Rev'd Christopher Andrew Jukes of Calgary, Alberta, who at that time was a bishop in the Communion of Evangelical Episcopal Churches, using the traditional ordinal of the Book of Common Prayer (1962 Canada). He also established the Federation of Independent Anglican Churches of North America with himself as self-styled archbishop; this organisation was incorporated by Federal Canadian Letters Patent on 1 October 2003.

== Political life ==
Baxter has run for federal Parliament four times in the riding of Newmarket-Aurora, under the Progressive Canadian Party banner. In the 2004 federal election, he received 1,079 votes, placing last out of five candidates. In the 2006 election he received 729 votes, and in the 2008 election he received 1,004 votes. He placed fifth out of six candidates in both 2006 and 2008. In the 2011 election, he received 1,001 votes, placing fifth out of six candidates, surpassing only Yvonne Mackie of the Animal Alliance Environment party. Baxter also ran in the 2010 by-election in the riding of Vaughan, finishing seventh of out eight candidates with 110 votes. He ran in the by-election for Markham—Thornhill on 3 April 2017, placing fourth out of seven candidates.

He founded NAPPA (The National Association for Public and Private Accountability) on the heels of his successful lawsuit against the Durham Region Children's Aid society. (See judgement by Justice Somers, 22 March 1994. Baxter versus Durham Region Children's Aid Society).

== Electoral record ==
=== Federal ===
2021 Canadian federal election: Newmarket—Aurora
Party	Candidate	Votes	%	±%	Expenditures
Liberal	Tony Van Bynen	24,208	43.8	+0.7	$96,047.56
Conservative	Harold Kim	21,173	38.3	+0.5	$112,882.72
New Democratic	Yvonne Kelly	6,338	11.5	+0.8	$17,822.22
People's	Andre Gagnon	2,296	4.2	+3.2	$3,308.84
Green	Tim Fleming	1,105	1.8	-4.0	$500.00
Independent	Dorian Baxter	260	0.5	-0.9	$1,598.82
Total valid votes		55,290			
Total rejected ballots		372			
Turnout		55,662	60.58		
Eligible voters		91,879			
Source: Elections Canada

2019 Canadian federal election: Newmarket—Aurora
Party	Candidate	Votes	%	±%	Expenditures
Liberal	Tony Van Bynen	26,488	43.1	-2.08	$88,608.07
Conservative	Lois Brown	23,232	37.8	-7.81	$74,278.42
New Democratic	Yvonne Kelly	6,576	10.7	+2.19	$18,620.10
Green	Walter Bauer	3,551	5.8	+3.44	none listed
Progressive Canadian	Dorian Baxter	901	1.5	+0.15	none listed
People's	Andrew McCaughtrie	588	1.0	–	none listed
Rhinoceros	Laurie Goble	104	0.2	–	none listed
Total valid votes/expense limit		61,460	100.0		
Total rejected ballots		424			
Turnout		61,884	67.3		
Eligible voters		91,920			
Liberal hold		Swing		+2.87	
Source: Elections Canada

Canadian federal by-election, February 25, 2019: York—Simcoe Resignation of Peter Van Loan
Party	Candidate	Votes	%	±%
Conservative	Scot Davidson	8,929	53.91	▲3.66
Liberal	Shaun Tanaka	4,811	29.04	▼8.72
New Democratic	Jessa McLean	1,244	7.51	▼1.38
Progressive Canadian	Dorian Baxter	634	3.83	--
Green	Mathew Lund	451	2.72	▼0.37
People's	Robert Geurts	314	1.90	--
Libertarian	Keith Dean Komar	95	0.57	--
Independent	John The Engineer Turmel	64	0.39	--
National Citizens Alliance	Adam Suhr	22	0.13	--
Total valid votes/expense limit		16,564	99.43	
Total rejected ballots		95	0.57	+0.09
Turnout		16,659	20.03	-43.23
Eligible voters		83,179		
Conservative hold		Swing		+6.19
Source: Elections Canada

Canadian federal by-election, April 3, 2017: Markham—Thornhill Resignation of John McCallum
Party	Candidate	Votes	%	±%
Liberal	Mary Ng	9,856	51.53	−4.19
Conservative	Ragavan Paranchothy	7,501	39.22	+6.91
New Democratic	Gregory Hines	671	3.51	−7.21
Progressive Canadian	Dorian Baxter	566	2.96	
Green	Caryn Bergmann	426	2.23	+0.98
Libertarian	Brendan Thomas Reilly	118	0.62	
Independent	Above Znoneofthe	77	0.40	
Total valid votes/expense limit		19,125	100.0	–
Total rejected ballots			-	
Turnout		27.51		
Eligible voters		69,838		
Liberal hold		Swing		−5.55

2015 Canadian federal election
Party	Candidate	Votes	%	±%	Expenditures
Liberal	Kyle Peterson	25,508	45.18	+21.47	–
Conservative	Lois Brown	24,057	42.61	−11.45	–
New Democratic	Yvonne Kelly	4,806	8.51	−7.28	–
Green	Vanessa Long	1,331	2.36	−2.03	–
Progressive Canadian	Dorian Baxter	762	1.35		–
Total valid votes/Expense limit		56,464	100.00		$219,391.75
Total rejected ballots		257	0.45	–	
Turnout		56,721	68.25	–	
Eligible voters		83,108			
Liberal gain from Conservative		Swing		+16.46	
Source: Elections Canada

Canadian federal by-election, November 25, 2013: Toronto Centre (federal electoral district) Resignation of Bob Rae (July 31, 2013)
Party	Candidate	Votes	%	±%	Expenditures
Liberal	Chrystia Freeland	17,194	49.38	+8.37	$ 97,609.64
New Democratic	Linda McQuaig	12,640	36.30	+6.09	99,230.30
Conservative	Geoff Pollock	3,004	8.63	−14.01	75,557.39
Green	John Deverell	1,034	2.97	−2.05	21,521.10
Progressive Canadian	Dorian Baxter	453	1.30		–
Libertarian	Judi Falardeau	236	0.68	+0.18	–
Independent	Kevin Clarke	84	0.24		560.00
Independent	John "The Engineer" Turmel	56	0.16		–
Independent	Leslie Bory	51	0.15		633.30
Online	Michael Nicula	43	0.12		200.00
Independent	Bahman Yazdanfar	26	0.07	−0.12	1,134.60
Total valid votes/expense limit		34,821	99.49	–	$ 101,793.06
Total rejected ballots		177	0.51	+0.12	
Turnout		34,998	37.72	−25.21	
Eligible voters		92,780			
Liberal hold		Swing		+1.14	
Source(s) "November 25, 2013 By-elections Poll-by-poll results". Elections Canada. "November 25, 2013 By-election – Financial Reports".

Canadian federal by-election, March 19, 2012: Toronto—Danforth Death of Jack Layton
Party	Candidate	Votes	%	±%	Expenditures
New Democratic	Craig Scott	19,210	59.44	−1.36	$ 82,847.22
Liberal	Grant Gordon	9,215	28.51	+10.89	86,016.54
Conservative	Andrew Keyes	1,736	5.37	−8.95	73,735.56
Green	Adriana Mugnatto-Hamu	1,517	4.69	−1.77	57,955.38
Progressive Canadian	Dorian Baxter	208	0.64	–	1,473.73
Libertarian	John C. Recker	133	0.41	–	2,433.05
Independent	Leslie Bory	77	0.24	–	898.69
Canadian Action	Christopher Porter	75	0.23	–	3,163.57
Independent	John Turmel	57	0.18	–	–
United	Brian Jedan	55	0.17	–	130.18
Independent	Bahman Yazdanfar	36	0.11	–	622.86
Total valid votes/expense limit		32,319	100.00		$ 86,821.95
Total rejected ballots		150	0.46	−0.13	
Turnout		32,469	43.58	−21.32	
New Democratic hold		Swing		−6.13	
Source(s) "By-election March 19, 2012 – Official Voting Results". Elections Canada. "Financial Reports: Candidate's Electoral Campaign Return – March 19, 2012 By-election".

2011 Canadian federal election: Newmarket—Aurora
Party	Candidate	Votes	%	±%
Conservative	Lois Brown	31,600	54.29	+7.56
Liberal	Kyle Peterson	13,908	23.90	−10.39
New Democratic	Kassandra Bidarian	8,886	15.27	+6.80
Green	Vanessa Long	2,628	4.52	−3.71
Progressive Canadian	Dorian Baxter	998	1.71	−0.18
Animal Alliance	Yvonne Mackie	182	0.31	
Total valid votes		58,202	100.00	
Total rejected ballots		219	0.37	
Turnout		58,421	64.01	
Eligible voters		91,275		

Canadian federal by-election, November 29, 2010: Vaughan resignation of Maurizio Bevilacqua on September 2, 2010
Party	Candidate	Votes	%	±%	Expenditures
Conservative	Julian Fantino	19,290	49.10	+14.77	–
Liberal	Tony Genco	18,326	46.65	-2.53	–
New Democratic	Kevin Bordian	661	1.68	-7.96	–
Green	Claudia Rodriguez-Larrain	481	1.22	-5.64	–
Libertarian	Paolo Fabrizio	251	0.64	–	–
Independent	Leslie Bory	111	0.28	–	–
Progressive Canadian	Dorian Baxter	110	0.28	–	–
United	Brian Jedan	55	0.14	–	–
Total valid votes/expense limit		39,285	100.00		$114,412
Total rejected ballots		231	0.58	-0.16	
Turnout		39,516	32.50	-19.42	
Conservative gain from Liberal		Swing		-8.6	

2008 Canadian federal election: Newmarket—Aurora
Party	Candidate	Votes	%	±%
Conservative	Lois Brown	24,873	46.73	+8.68
Liberal	Tim Jones	18,250	34.29	−11.93
New Democratic	Mike Seaward	4,508	8.47	−1.12
Green	Glenn Hubbers	4,381	8.23	+3.46
Progressive Canadian	Dorian Baxter	1,004	1.89	+0.65
Christian Heritage	Ray Luff	211	0.40	

2006 Canadian federal election: Newmarket—Aurora
Party	Candidate	Votes	%	±%
Liberal	Belinda Stronach	27,176	46.22	+5.14
Conservative	Lois Brown	22,371	38.05	−4.37
New Democratic	Ed Chudak	5,639	9.59	−0.34
Green	Glenn Hubbers	2,805	4.77	+0.30
Progressive Canadian	Dorian Baxter	729	1.24	−0.86
Canadian Action	Peter Maloney	79	0.13	

2004 Canadian federal election: Newmarket—Aurora
Party	Candidate	Votes	%	±%
Conservative	Belinda Stronach	21,818	42.42	−2.43
Liberal	Martha Hall Findlay	21,129	41.08	−9.48
New Democratic	Ed Chudak	5,111	9.93	+6.18
Green	Daryl Wyatt	2,298	4.47	
Progressive Canadian	Dorian Baxter	1,079	2.10	–
Total valid votes		51,435	100.00	–
Change is from redistributed 2000 results. Conservative change is from the total of Canadian Alliance and Progressive Conservative votes.

=== Provincial ===
2018 Ontario general election: Newmarket—Aurora
Party	Candidate	Votes	%	±%
Progressive Conservative	Christine Elliott	24,813	47.71	+10.98
New Democratic	Melissa Williams	12,405	23.85	+11.91
Liberal	Chris Ballard	11,840	22.76	-21.36
Green	Michelle Bourdeau	1,859	3.57	-0.47
Independent	Dorian Baxter	447	0.86	
Trillium	Bob Yaciuk	212	0.41	
Libertarian	Lori Robbins	192	0.37	
None of the Above	Denis Van Decker	185	0.36	
Moderate	Denis Gorlynskiy	60	0.12	
Total valid votes		52,013	99.01	
Total rejected, unmarked and declined ballots		518	0.99	
Turnout		52,531	58.97	
Eligible voters		89,076		
Progressive Conservative notional gain from Liberal		Swing		+16.17
Source: Elections Ontario

2014 Ontario general election
Party	Candidate	Votes	%	±%
Liberal	Chris Ballard	22,942	43.80	+8.18
Progressive Conservative	Jane Twinney	19,510	37.25	-9.99
New Democratic	Angus Duff	6,092	11.63	-2.73
Green	Andrew Roblin	2,167	4.14	+1.37
Canadians' Choice	Dorian Baxter	925	1.77	
Libertarian	Jason Jenkins	579	1.11	
Trillium	Bob Yaciuk	164	0.31	
Total valid votes		52,379	100.00	
Liberal gain from Progressive Conservative		Swing		+9.09
Source: Elections Ontario

=== Municipal ===
2014 Newmarket Mayoral Election	Vote	%
Tony Van Bynen (X)	10,816	54.01
Chris Campbell	7,804	38.97
Dorian Baxter	1,407	7.03

== See also ==
- Elvis impersonator
