= Sandra Cobena =

Canadian politician

Sandra Cobena MP

Member of Parliament for Newmarket—Aurora
- Incumbent
- Assumed office April 28, 2025
- Preceded by: Tony Van Bynen

Personal details
- Born: Ecuador
- Party: Conservative
- Spouse: Matthijs van Gaalen
- Children: 3

Sandra Cobena is a Canadian politician and former banker who has served as the member of Parliament for the riding of Newmarket—Aurora since 2025 as a member of the Conservative Party of Canada.

== Background ==
Cobena immigrated to Canada from Ecuador in 2006. She completed an executive global master’s in management from the London School of Economics, and a double honours degree in global commerce and finance from the University of Western Ontario.

Prior to entering politics, Cobena worked as a commercial banker at Toronto-Dominion Bank.

At the time of the 2025 Canadian federal election, she lived in Aurora, Ontario.

== Political career ==
On December 10, 2023, Cobena won the Conservative nomination for the riding of Newmarket—Aurora and was elected member of Parliament in the 2025 federal election. She serves on the Canadian House of Commons Standing Committee on Finance.

== Personal life ==
Cobena is married to Matthijs van Gaalen, who served as vice-president of the Conservative Party from 2018 to 2021. They have four children.

== Electoral record ==
2025 Canadian federal election: Newmarket—Aurora
** Preliminary results — Not yet official **
Party	Candidate	Votes	%	±%	Expenditures
Conservative	Sandra Cobena	31,540	50.62	+12.46	
Liberal	Jennifer McLachlan	29,294	47.02	+3.24	
New Democratic	Anna Gollen	1,473	2.36	–9.19	
Total valid votes/expense limit					
Total rejected ballots					
Turnout		62,307	70.66		
Eligible voters		88,179			
Conservative notional gain from Liberal		Swing		+4.61	
Source: Elections Canada
