= York—South Simcoe =

Federal electoral district in Ontario, Canada

Ontario electoral district
- Interactive map of riding boundaries from the 2025 federal election

Federal electoral district
- Legislature: House of Commons
MP
Scot Davidson
Conservative
- District created: 2023
- First contested: 2025
- Last contested: 2025
- District webpage: profile, map

Demographics
- Population (2021): 119,358
- Electors (2025): 95,708
- Census division(s): Simcoe, York
- Census subdivision(s): New Tecumseth, Bradford West Gwillimbury, East Gwillimbury (part)

York—South Simcoe (French: York—Simcoe-Sud; formerly New Tecumseth—Gwillimbury) is a federal electoral district in Ontario, Canada.

It came into effect upon the call of the 2025 Canadian federal election, during which it was named New Tecumseth—Gwillimbury. The riding changed to its current name in 2026 as part of Bill C-25 of the 45th Canadian Parliament.

== Geography ==
The constituency covers an east to west area in Central Ontario. The riding contains the municipalities of Bradford West Gwillimbury, New Tecumseth and almost the entirety of East Gwillimbury.

== Demographics ==
According to the 2021 Canadian census

Languages: 74.3% English, 2.4% Portuguese, 2.2% Italian, 2.0% Spanish, 1.8% Russian, 1.7% Farsi, 1.6% Mandarin, 1.4% French, 1.3% Cantonese, 1.1% Tamil, 1.0% Urdu

Religions: 58.7% Christian (31.7% Catholic, 4.3% United Church, 3.9% Anglican, 2.9% Christian Orthodox, 1.6% Presbyterian, 1.2% Baptist, 1.2% Pentecostal, 11.9% Other), 30.7% No religion, 4.3% Muslim, 2.5% Hindu, 1.3% Buddhist, 1.0% Sikh

Median income: $44,800 (2020)

Average income: $55,600 (2020)

Racial groups in New Tecumseth—Gwillimbury (2021)
Racial group	2021	
Racial group	Pop.	%
White (Note: Statistic includes all persons that did not make up part of a visible minority or an indigenous identity.)	85,875	72.91%
South Asian	7,200	6.11%
Chinese	4,760	4.04%
Black	3,845	3.26%
West Asian	3,430	2.91%
Latin American	3,055	2.59%
Southeast Asian	2,005	1.7%
Indigenous	1,750	1.49%
Filipino	1,660	1.41%
Arab	1,365	1.16%
Korean	540	0.46%
Japanese	160	0.14%
Other (Note: "Visible minority, n.i.e.")	970	0.82%
Multiple races (Note: "Multiple visible minorities" under visible minority section on census.)	1,165	0.99%
Total responses	117,785	98.68%
Total population	119,360	100%
Notes: Totals greater than 100% due to multiple origin responses. Demographics based on 2022 Canadian federal electoral redistribution riding boundaries.

== History ==
The riding was created under the 2022 Canadian federal electoral redistribution, largely replacing York—Simcoe, and gaining part of Simcoe—Grey.

Parliament	Years	Member	Party
New Tecumseth—Gwillimbury; Riding created from Simcoe—Grey and York—Simcoe
45th	2025–2026	Scot Davidson	Conservative
York—South Simcoe
45th	2026–present	Scot Davidson	Conservative

== Election results ==
2025 Canadian federal election: New Tecumseth—Gwillimbury
Party	Candidate	Votes	%	±%
Conservative	Scot Davidson	39,247	59.35	+11.68
Liberal	Mike Hanrahan	24,444	36.97	+6.70
New Democratic	Nancy Morrison	1,226	1.85	–11.20
Green	Callum McKinnon	712	1.08	–0.16
People's	Paul Montague	496	0.75	–6.74
Total valid votes		66,125	99.34	
Total rejected ballots		442	0.66	-0.15
Turnout		66,567	68.45	+11.43
Eligible voters		97,255		
Conservative notional hold		Swing		+2.49
Source: Elections Canada

2021 federal election redistributed results
Party	Vote	%
Conservative	23,600	47.67
Liberal	14,987	30.27
New Democratic	6,461	13.05
People's	3,708	7.49
Green	613	1.24
Christian Heritage	140	0.28
Total valid votes	49,509	99.19
Rejected ballots	405	0.81
Registered voters/ estimated turnout	87,548	57.01

== Student vote results ==
2025 New Tecumseth—Gwillimbury student vote
46.42%	22.53%	13.08%	11.91%	6.06%
Conservative	Liberal	Green	NDP	PPC

== See also ==
- List of Canadian electoral districts
