= Newmarket—Aurora (federal electoral district) =

Federal electoral district in Ontario, Canada

Coordinates: 44.027°N 79.449°W

Ontario electoral district
- Interactive map of riding boundaries from the 2025 federal election

Federal electoral district
- Legislature: House of Commons
MP
Sandra Cobena
Conservative
- District created: 2003
- First contested: 2004
- Last contested: 2025
- District webpage: profile, map

Demographics
- Population (2011): 109,457
- Electors (2015): 83,108
- Area (km²): 62
- Pop. density (per km²): 1,765.4
- Census division: York
- Census subdivision(s): Newmarket, Aurora (part), East Gwillimbury (part)

Newmarket—Aurora is a federal electoral district in Ontario, Canada, which has been represented in the House of Commons since 2004.

The district contains the town of Newmarket, part of Aurora, and a very small portion of East Gwillimbury.

According to the 2006 census, 121,924 people are represented in the House of Commons in this riding.

A suburban swing riding; the major industry in the riding is manufacturing, and auto parts maker Magna International is the largest manufacturer. According to the 2006 census, the average family income is $118,060 which is higher than the national average. Unemployment in the riding is lower than the national average at 3.6%. Retail trade and the service sector are also important to the economy.

== Boundaries ==
The riding consists of that part of the Regional Municipality of York comprising the town of Newmarket, the part of the town of Aurora north of Wellington street, and the part of the town of East Gwillimbury south of Green Lane and west of Highway 404.

== Demographics ==
According to the 2021 Canadian census

Ethnic groups: 60.5% White, 13.8% Chinese, 6.6% West Asian, 4.4% South Asian, 2.6% Black, 2.1% Filipino, 2.0% Southeast Asian, 1.6% Latin American, 1.5% Indigenous, 1.2% Korean, 1.1% Arab
Languages: 61.2% English, 6.3% Mandarin, 4.8% Persian, 3.8% Cantonese, 2.8% Russian, 1.5% Italian, 1.4% Spanish, 1.0% French, 1.0% Tagalog
Religions: 49.7% Christian (23.5% Catholic, 4.7% Christian Orthodox, 3.9% Anglican, 3.4% United Church, 1.5% Presbyterian, 12.7% Other), 6.1% Muslim, 2.2% Buddhist, 1.9% Jewish, 1.5% Hindu, 37.6% None
Median income: $42,800 (2020)
Average income: $59,350 (2020)

== History ==
The riding was created for the 2004 election by merging 50% of the riding of York North with 24% of the riding of Vaughan—King—Aurora.

Following the 2022 Canadian federal electoral redistribution, it lost the Aurora neighbourhoods of Hills of St. Andrew and Aurora Heights to Aurora—Oak Ridges—Richmond Hill.

== Riding associations ==
Riding associations are the local branches of the national political parties:

Party	Association name	CEO	HQ city
Conservative	Newmarket--Aurora Conservative Association	Blake C. Koehler	Newmarket
Liberal	Newmarket--Aurora Federal Liberal Association	Matt Gunning	Aurora
New Democratic	Newmarket--Aurora Federal NDP Riding Association	Brian Trujillo	Ottawa

== Members of Parliament ==
This riding has elected the following members of Parliament:

Parliament	Years	Member	Party
Newmarket—Aurora; Riding created from York North and Vaughan—King—Aurora
38th	2004–2005	Belinda Stronach	Conservative
38th	2005–2006	Belinda Stronach	Liberal
39th	2006–2008	Belinda Stronach	Liberal
40th	2008–2011	Lois Brown	Conservative
41st	2011–2015	Lois Brown	Conservative
42nd	2015–2019	Kyle Peterson	Liberal
43rd	2019–2021	Tony Van Bynen	Liberal
44th	2021–2025	Tony Van Bynen	Liberal
45th	2025–present	Sandra Cobena	Conservative

== Election results ==
Graph of general election results in Newmarket—Aurora (minor parties that never got 2% of the vote or didn't run consistently are omitted) View source data.

2025 Canadian federal election
** Preliminary results — Not yet official **
Party	Candidate	Votes	%	±%	Expenditures
Conservative	Sandra Cobena	31,540	50.62	+12.46	
Liberal	Jennifer McLachlan	29,294	47.02	+3.24	
New Democratic	Anna Gollen	1,473	2.36	–9.19	
Total valid votes/expense limit					
Total rejected ballots					
Turnout		62,307	70.66		
Eligible voters		88,179			
Conservative notional gain from Liberal		Swing		+4.61	
Source: Elections Canada

2021 federal election redistributed results
Party	Vote	%
Liberal	22,067	43.78
Conservative	19,236	38.16
New Democratic	5,824	11.55
People's	2,114	4.19
Green	929	1.84
Others	240	0.48

2021 Canadian federal election
Party	Candidate	Votes	%	±%	Expenditures
Liberal	Tony Van Bynen	24,208	43.8	+0.7	$96,047.56
Conservative	Harold Kim	21,173	38.3	+0.5	$112,882.72
New Democratic	Yvonne Kelly	6,338	11.5	+0.8	$17,822.22
People's	Andre Gagnon	2,296	4.2	+3.2	$3,308.84
Green	Tim Fleming	1,105	1.8	-4.0	$500.00
Independent	Dorian Baxter	260	0.5	-0.9	$1,598.82
Total valid votes		55,290			
Total rejected ballots		372			
Turnout		55,662	60.58		
Eligible voters		91,879			
Source: Elections Canada

2019 Canadian federal election
Party	Candidate	Votes	%	±%	Expenditures
Liberal	Tony Van Bynen	26,488	43.1	-2.08	$88,608.07
Conservative	Lois Brown	23,232	37.8	-7.81	$74,278.42
New Democratic	Yvonne Kelly	6,576	10.7	+2.19	$18,620.10
Green	Walter Bauer	3,551	5.8	+3.44	none listed
Progressive Canadian	Dorian Baxter	901	1.5	+0.15	none listed
People's	Andrew McCaughtrie	588	1.0	–	none listed
Rhinoceros	Laurie Goble	104	0.2	–	none listed
Total valid votes/expense limit		61,460	100.0		
Total rejected ballots		424			
Turnout		61,884	67.3		
Eligible voters		91,920			
Liberal hold		Swing		+2.87	
Source: Elections Canada

2015 Canadian federal election
Party	Candidate	Votes	%	±%	Expenditures
Liberal	Kyle Peterson	25,508	45.18	+21.47	$84,535.55
Conservative	Lois Brown	24,057	42.61	−11.45	$162,456.63
New Democratic	Yvonne Kelly	4,806	8.51	−7.28	$26,593.85
Green	Vanessa Long	1,331	2.36	−2.03	$2,677.04
Progressive Canadian	Dorian Baxter	762	1.35		$3,282.89
Total valid votes/Expense limit		56,464	100.00		$219,830.00
Total rejected ballots		257	0.45	–	
Turnout		56,721	68.25	–	
Eligible voters		83,108			
Liberal gain from Conservative		Swing		+16.46	
Source: Elections Canada

2011 federal election redistributed results
Party	Vote	%
Conservative	25,557	54.05
Liberal	11,207	23.70
New Democratic	7,467	15.79
Green	2,072	4.38
Others	977	2.07

2011 Canadian federal election
Party	Candidate	Votes	%	±%
Conservative	Lois Brown	31,600	54.29	+7.56
Liberal	Kyle Peterson	13,908	23.90	−10.39
New Democratic	Kassandra Bidarian	8,886	15.27	+6.80
Green	Vanessa Long	2,628	4.52	−3.71
Progressive Canadian	Dorian Baxter	998	1.71	−0.18
Animal Alliance	Yvonne Mackie	182	0.31	
Total valid votes		58,202	100.00	
Total rejected ballots		219	0.37	
Turnout		58,421	64.01	
Eligible voters		91,275		

2008 Canadian federal election
Party	Candidate	Votes	%	±%
Conservative	Lois Brown	24,873	46.73	+8.68
Liberal	Tim Jones	18,250	34.29	−11.93
New Democratic	Mike Seaward	4,508	8.47	−1.12
Green	Glenn Hubbers	4,381	8.23	+3.46
Progressive Canadian	Dorian Baxter	1,004	1.89	+0.65
Christian Heritage	Ray Luff	211	0.40	

2006 Canadian federal election
Party	Candidate	Votes	%	±%
Liberal	Belinda Stronach	27,176	46.22	+5.14
Conservative	Lois Brown	22,371	38.05	−4.37
New Democratic	Ed Chudak	5,639	9.59	−0.34
Green	Glenn Hubbers	2,805	4.77	+0.30
Progressive Canadian	Dorian Baxter	729	1.24	−0.86
Canadian Action	Peter Maloney	79	0.13	

2004 Canadian federal election
Party	Candidate	Votes	%	±%
Conservative	Belinda Stronach	21,818	42.42	−2.43
Liberal	Martha Hall Findlay	21,129	41.08	−9.48
New Democratic	Ed Chudak	5,111	9.93	+6.18
Green	Daryl Wyatt	2,298	4.47	
Progressive Canadian	Dorian Baxter	1,079	2.10	–
Total valid votes		51,435	100.00	–
Change is from redistributed 2000 results. Conservative change is from the total of Canadian Alliance and Progressive Conservative votes.

== See also ==
- List of Canadian electoral districts
- Historical federal electoral districts of Canada
