= Progressive Canadian Party =

Progressive Canadian Party Parti progressiste canadien
- Founder: Joe Hueglin
- Founded: March 29, 2004
- Registered: Inactive
- Dissolved: November 30, 2019
- Split from: Progressive Conservative Party of Canada
- Headquarters: 218 Twyford Street; Ottawa, Ontario; K1V 0V9
- Ideology: Liberal conservatism Progressive conservatism Red Toryism
- Political position: Centre to centre-right
- Colours: Blue, usually with Red trim

The Progressive Canadian Party (PC Party) (French: Parti progressiste canadien) was a minor federal political party in Canada. A centre to centre-right party, it was registered with Elections Canada, the government's election agency, on March 29, 2004.

Under provisions of the Canada Elections Act that took effect on May 14, 2004, parties were only required to nominate one candidate in order to qualify for official party status in the June 28, 2004, federal election. This meant that Progressive Canadian Party candidates were listed on the ballot alongside the party's name, rather than being designated as independents.

The party was deregistered by the Chief Electoral Officer of Canada on November 30, 2019, for failing to comply with Canada Elections Act requirements set out in subsection 415(1).

== Founding and 2004 election ==
Following the dissolution of the Progressive Conservative Party of Canada and its merger with the Canadian Alliance into the new Conservative Party of Canada, the Progressive Canadian Party was formed by "Red Tories" who opposed the merger. On January 9, 2004, the party filed an application with the Chief Electoral Officer to become a registered party called the Progressive Conservative Party of Canada. The application was refused on the grounds that the name could no longer be utilized. The group resubmitted with the name Progressive Canadian Party, and a new "PC Party" was recognized by Elections Canada on March 26. One of the organizers, Joe Hueglin, was a former Progressive Conservative Member of Parliament (MP) from Niagara Falls, Ontario.

In announcing the new party, Hueglin stated that the party had about a dozen potential candidates and a mailing list of 330 names. The party nominated 16 candidates for the 2004 general election, mostly in southern Ontario and Nova Scotia.

The party held a national convention in 2005 to select a leader and to develop policies. It has also established the "Macdonald-Cartier PC Fund" to raise money for the party, under the direction of Sinclair Stevens, a cabinet minister in the Progressive Conservative government of Brian Mulroney.

On November 17, 2005, the Federal Court of Appeal rejected Stevens' lawsuit to force Chief Electoral Officer Jean-Pierre Kingsley to rescind recognition of the merger of the Progressive Conservative Party with the Canadian Alliance. The court did rule, however, that Kingsley erred in not waiting 30 days to register the merger. Stevens appealed the ruling to the Supreme Court of Canada, but that court announced on April 27, 2006, that it would not hear the appeal. The court gave no reason for its decision.

== 2006 election ==
Founding party leader Ernie Schreiber resigned in 2005 because of a heart condition. The party appointed Tracy Parsons as his successor. The party nominated 25 candidates for the 2006 federal election. Former Progressive Conservative cabinet minister and leadership candidate Heward Grafftey stood as a candidate for the party during that election. (See also: Progressive Canadian Party candidates, 2006 Canadian federal election.)

== 2011 election ==
Riding	Province	Candidate	Votes	%	Placement
Macleod	Alberta	Brad Carrigan	1754	3.40	5/6
South Surrey—White Rock—Cloverdale	British Columbia	Brian Marlatt	228	0.39	7/9
Vancouver Centre	British Columbia	Michael Huenefeld	285	0.48	6/8
West Vancouver—Sunshine Coast—Sea to Sky Country	British Columbia	Roger Lagassé	293	0.47	5/9
Hamilton East—Stoney Creek	Ontario	Gord Hill	468	0.96	5/9
Newmarket—Aurora	Ontario	Dorian Baxter	998	1.71	5/6
Oak Ridges—Markham	Ontario	John Siciliano	1080	1.19	5/5
Ottawa South	Ontario	Al Gullon	513	0.87	5/6
Prince Edward—Hastings	Ontario	Andrew Skinner	171	0.31	6/6

== 2015 election ==
In the 2015 election, the party ran eight candidates, none of whom were elected with five getting the fewest votes in their riding.

Riding	Province	Candidate	Votes	%	Placement
Etobicoke Centre	Ontario	Rob Wolvin	378	0.6	5/5
Newmarket—Aurora	Ontario	Dorian Baxter	762	1.3	5/5
Ottawa South	Ontario	Al Gullon	361	0.6	5/7
Toronto—Danforth	Ontario	John Richardson	1,275	2.3	5/6
Calgary Skyview	Alberta	Najeeb Butt	957	2.1	4/9
Prince George—Peace River—Northern Rockies	British Columbia	Barry Blackman	464	0.9	5/5
South Surrey-White Rock	British Columbia	Brian Marlatt	108	0.2	5/5
Vancouver South	British Columbia	Raj Gupta	167	0.3	6/6

== Platform and goals ==
The party aimed to be the successor to the former Progressive Conservative Party. A few prominent figures were associated with this new party (Stevens and Heward Grafftey). David Orchard, a fervent opponent of the merger of the Progressive Conservative Party of Canada and the Canadian Alliance, made no official statement about the new party. During the 2006 election, Orchard endorsed and later joined the Liberal Party.

The party adopted the last policy platform of the Progressive Conservative party; they also began to create new policies for Canada to meet new situations and challenges. These platforms included (but were not limited to): support of the Canadian Wheat Board, support for small business, belief in a single-tier health-care system, the promise of eliminating student debt, and a foreign policy that emphasizes Canada's dual role of peace-keepers and diplomats. The new party's official logo and initials were an homage to the Progressive Conservative Party, from where the party claims to draw its history, policy, and constitution.

=== Seven Pillars for Prosperity ===
According to the party's website, the Progressive Canadian Party had "seven pillars for bringing prosperity to Canada". These seven pillars are:

1. "Facilitating post-secondary education"
2. "Realizing growth opportunities"
3. "Harnessing renewable resources"
4. "Meeting differing needs"
5. "Serving the world"
6. "Allying for peace and stability"
7. "Bringing new hope"

== Election results ==
Election	# of candidates	# of votes	% of popular vote	% of popular vote in ridings with PC candidates
2004	16	10,733	0.08%	1.402%
2006	25	14,151	0.10%	1.079%
2008	10	5,920	0.04%	1.188%
2011	9	5,790	0.04%	1.067%
2015	8	4,476	0.03%	1.027%
2019	3	1,534	0.01%	0.825%

- Eligibility: March 29, 2004
- Short-form name: PC Party
- Party leader: Hon. Sinclair Stevens, P.C.
- President: Dorian Baxter
- National co-ordinator: Joe Hueglin
- Chief agent: Macdonald Cartier PC Fund
- Auditor: Ben Seto, C.A.

By-Election	candidate	# of votes	% of popular vote	place	Winner
London North Centre	Steve Hunter	146	0.38%	5/7	Glen Pearson (Lib)
Vaughan	Dorian Baxter	110	0.28%	7/8	Julian Fantino (Con)
Toronto-Danforth	Dorian Baxter	208	0.64%	5/11	Craig Scott (NDP)
Toronto Centre	Dorian Baxter	453	1.30%	5/11	Chrystia Freeland (Lib)
Markham-Thornhill	Dorian Baxter	566	2.90%	4/7	Mary Ng (Lib)
South Surrey—White Rock	Michael Huenefeld	86	0.28%	7/7	Gordie Hogg (Lib)
York-Simcoe	Dorian Baxter	634	3.80%	4/9	Scot Davidson (Con)
Nanaimo—Ladysmith	Brian Marlett	248	0.61%	6/7	Paul Manly (Green)

== PC Party leaders ==
Name	Term start	Term end	Notes
Ernie Schreiber	2004	2005	First leader
Tracy Parsons	2005	2007	
Sinclair Stevens	2007	2016	Interim leader
Joe Hueglin	2016	2019	Interim leader

== See also ==
- List of political parties in Canada
- Red Tory
- Canadian Future Party
