= List of Reform Party of Canada MPs =

This is a list of Reform Party MPs. It includes all members of Parliament that were elected to the House of Commons representing the Reform Party of Canada, between 1987 and 2000.

== List of MPs ==
=== A ===
- Jim Abbott, Kootenay East, 1993–1997; Kootenay—Columbia, 1997–2000
- Diane Ablonczy, Calgary North, 1993–1997; Calgary Nose Hill, 1997–2000
- Rob Anders, Calgary West, 1997–2000

=== B ===
- Roy Bailey, Souris—Moose Mountain, 1997–2000
- Leon Benoit, Vegreville, 1993–1997; Lakeland, 1997–2000
- Cliff Breitkreuz, Yellowhead, 1993–2000
- Garry Breitkreuz, Yorkton—Melville, 1993–2000
- Margaret Bridgman, Surrey North, 1993–1997
- Jan Brown, Calgary Southeast, 1993–1997

=== C ===
- Chuck Cadman, Surrey North, 1997–2000
- Rick Casson, Lethbridge, 1997–2000
- David Chatters, Athabasca, 1993–2000
- John Cummins, Delta, 1993–1997; Delta—South Richmond, 1997–2000

=== D ===
- John Duncan, North Island—Powell River, 1993–1997; Vancouver Island North, 1997–2000

=== E ===
- Reed Elley, Nanaimo—Cowichan, 1997–2000
- Ken Epp, Elk Island, 1993–2000

=== F ===
- Paul Forseth, New Westminster—Burnaby, 1993–1997; New Westminster—Coquitlam—Burnaby, 1997–2000
- Jack Frazer, Saanich—Gulf Islands, 1993–1997

=== G ===
- Bill Gilmour, Comox—Alberni, 1993–1997; Nanaimo—Alberni, 1997–2000
- Peter Goldring, Edmonton East, 1997–2000
- Jim Gouk, Kootenay West—Revelstoke, 1993–1997; Kootenay—Boundary—Okanagan, 1997–2000
- Gurmant Grewal, Surrey Central, 1997–2000
- Deborah Grey, Beaver River, 1989–1997; Edmonton North, 1997–2000
- Herb Grubel, Capilano—Howe Sound, 1993–1997

=== H ===
- Art Hanger, Calgary Northeast, 1993–2000
- Hugh Hanrahan, Edmonton Strathcona, 1993–1997
- Ed Harper, Simcoe Centre, 1993–1997
- Stephen Harper, Calgary West, 1993–1997
- Dick Harris, Prince George—Bulkley Valley, 1993–2000
- Jim Hart, Okanagan—Similkameen—Merritt, 1993–1997; Okanagan—Coquihalla, 1997–2000
- Sharon Hayes, Port Moody—Coquitlam, 1993–1997
- Elwin Hermanson, Kindersley—Lloydminster, 1993–1997
- Grant Hill, Macleod, 1993–2000
- Jay Hill, Prince George—Peace River, 1993–2000
- Howard Hilstrom, Selkirk—Interlake, 1997–2000
- Jake Hoeppner, Portage—Lisgar, 1997–2000

=== J ===
- Rahim Jaffer, Edmonton Strathcona, 1997–2000
- Daphne Jennings. Mission—Coquitlam, 1993–1997
- Dale Johnston, Wetaskiwin, 1993–2000

=== K ===
- Jason Kenney, Calgary Southeast, 1997–2000
- Allan Kerpan, Moose Jaw—Lake Centre, 1993–1997; Blackstrap, 1997–2000
- Derrek Konrad, Prince Albert, 1997–2000

=== L ===
- Eric Lowther, Calgary Centre, 1997–2000
- Gary Lunn, Saanich—Gulf Islands, 1997–2000

=== M ===
- Preston Manning, Calgary Southwest, 1993–2000
- Inky Mark, Dauphin—Swan River, 1997–2000
- Keith Martin, Esquimalt—Juan de Fuca, 1993–2000
- Philip Mayfield, Cariboo—Chilcotin, 1993–2000
- Ian McClelland, Edmonton Southwest, 1993–2000
- Grant McNally, Dewdney—Alouette, 1997–2000
- Val Meredith, Surrey—White Rock—South Langley, 1993–1997; South Surrey—White Rock—Langley, 1997–2000
- Bob Mills, Red Deer, 1993–2000
- Lee Morrison, Swift Current—Maple Creek—Assiniboia, 1993–1997; Cypress Hills—Grasslands, 1997–2000

=== O ===
- Deepak Obhrai, Calgary East, 1997–2000

=== P ===
- Jim Pankiw, Saskatoon—Humboldt, 1997–2000
- Charlie Penson, Peace River, 1993–2000

=== R ===
- Jack Ramsay, Crowfoot, 1993–2000
- John Reynolds, West Vancouver—Sunshine Coast, 1997–2000
- Bob Ringma, Nanaimo—Cowichan, 1993–1997
- Gerry Ritz, Battlefords—Lloydminster, 1997–2000

=== S ===
- Werner Schmidt, Okanagan Centre, 1993–1997; Kelowna, 1997–2000
- Mike Scott, Skeena, 1993–2000
- Jim Silye, Calgary Centre, 1993–1997
- Monte Solberg, Medicine Hat, 1993–2000
- Raymond Speaker, Lethbridge, 1993–1997
- Darrel Stinson, Okanagan—Shuswap, 1993–2000
- Chuck Strahl, Fraser Valley East, 1993–1997; Fraser Valley, 1997–2000

=== T ===
- Myron Thompson, Wild Rose, 1993–2000

=== V ===
- Maurice Vellacott, Wanuskewin, 1997–2000

=== W ===
- Randy White, Fraser Valley West, 1993–1997; Langley—Abbotsford, 1997–2000
- Ted White, North Vancouver, 1993–2000
- John Williams, St. Albert, 1993–2000
