= By-elections to the 34th Canadian Parliament =

By-elections to the 34th Canadian Parliament were held to fill vacancies in the House of Commons of Canada between the 1988 federal election and the 1993 federal election. The Progressive Conservative Party of Canada led a majority government for the entirety of the 34th Canadian Parliament, though their number did decrease from by-elections.

Sixteen seats became vacant during the life of the Parliament. Six of these vacancies were filled through by-elections.

By-election	Date	Incumbent	Party	Winner	Party	Cause	Retained
Beauséjour	December 10, 1990	Fernand Robichaud	Liberal	Jean Chrétien	Liberal	Resignation to provide a seat for Chrétien	Yes
York North	December 10, 1990	Maurizio Bevilacqua	Liberal	Maurizio Bevilacqua	Liberal	Election declared void	Yes
Oshawa	August 13, 1990	Ed Broadbent	New Democratic	Mike Breaugh	New Democratic	Resignation	Yes
Laurier—Sainte-Marie	August 13, 1990	Jean-Claude Malépart	Liberal	Gilles Duceppe	Independent	Death	No
Chambly	February 12, 1990	Richard Grisé	Progressive Conservative	Phil Edmonston	New Democratic	Resignation	No
Beaver River	March 13, 1989	John Dahmer	Progressive Conservative	Deborah Grey	Reform	Death (cancer)	No

== See also ==
- List of federal by-elections in Canada

== Sources ==
- Parliament of Canada–Elected in By-Elections
