= 1990 Beauséjour federal by-election =

- December 10, 1990

Riding of Beauséjour
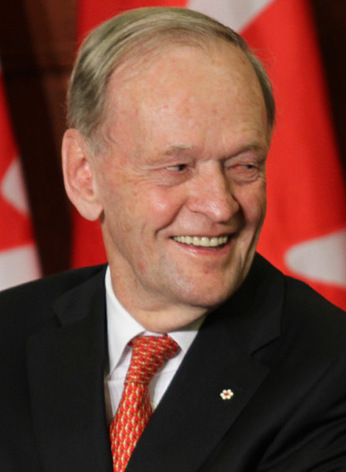
	First party	Second party	Third party
		NDP	CoR
Candidate	Jean Chrétien	Guy Cormier	Margie Bowes-Legood
Party	Liberal	New Democratic	Confederation of Regions
Popular vote	17,332	12,587	2,783
Percentage	51.45%	37.37%	8.26%
Swing	▼7.16pp	▲27.12pp	▲4.37pp
MP before election
Fernand Robichaud
Liberal
Elected MP
Jean Chrétien
Liberal

A by-election was held in the federal riding of Beauséjour in New Brunswick on December 10, 1990, following the resignation of Liberal MP Fernand Robichaud.

The by-election was held on the same day as another in York North in Ontario. The seat was held for the Liberals by Jean Chrétien who had been elected leader of the Liberal Party of Canada.

In the 1993 Canadian federal election, Chrétien was elected in Saint-Maurice, Quebec and became the 20th Prime Minister of Canada.

== Results ==
Canadian federal by-election, 10 December 1990
Party	Candidate	Votes	%	±%
On the resignation of Fernand Robichaud, 24 September 1990
Liberal	Jean Chrétien	17,332	51.45	-7.16
New Democratic	Guy Cormier	12,587	37.36	+27.12
Confederation of Regions	Margie Bowes-Legood	2,789	8.28	+4.37
Independent	Alonzo LeBlanc	450	1.34	
Christian Heritage	Mae Boudreau-Pedersen	286	0.85	
Rhinoceros	Bryan Gold	246	0.73	
Total valid votes		33,690	100.00	

== 1988 result ==
1988 Canadian federal election
Party	Candidate	Votes	%	±%
Liberal	Fernand Robichaud	22,650	58.61	+16.86
Progressive Conservative	Omer Léger	10,525	27.24	-10.72
New Democratic	Lyman Dean	3,958	10.24	-10.05
Confederation of Regions	Russell Bowes	1,511	3.91	
Total valid votes		38,644	100.00	
