= Reform MPs =

Reform MPs are members of parliament for political parties named Reform:

- List of Reform Party of Canada MPs, Canada
- List of Reform UK MPs, United Kingdom

== See also ==
- Estonian Reform Party § Parliamentary elections
- Reform Party (Latvia) § Parliament (Saeima)
- Reform Party (New Zealand) § Electoral results
- Reform Party (disambiguation)
