= Angela Vautour =

Canadian politician (born 1960)

Member of Parliament for Beauséjour—Petitcodiac
- In office June 2, 1997 – November 27, 2000
- Preceded by: Fernand Robichaud
- Succeeded by: Dominic LeBlanc

Personal details
- Born: April 10, 1960 (age 66) Rexton, New Brunswick, Canada
- Party: Conservative (since 2004); Progressive Conservative (1999–2004); New Democratic (until 1999)
- Profession: Civil servant

Angela Vautour (born April 10, 1960) is a former Canadian politician, who represented the electoral district of Beauséjour—Petitcodiac in the House of Commons of Canada from 1997 to 2000.

Vautour was elected in the 1997 election as a New Democrat, as part of a Maritime breakthrough for the party.

On September 27, 1999, Vautour crossed the floor to join the Progressive Conservative caucus. She stood for election as a PC candidate in the 2000 election, but was defeated by Liberal candidate Dominic LeBlanc. In 2004, she ran for the newly formed Conservative Party of Canada, but again was defeated.

In 2023, she spoke out against rent increases.

== Electoral record ==
Beauséjour - 2004 Canadian federal election
Party	Candidate	Votes	%	±%
Liberal	Dominic LeBlanc	21,934	53.28	+6.18
Conservative	Angela Vautour	11,604	28.19	-17.65
New Democratic	Omer Bourque	6,056	14.71	+7.65
Green	Anna Girouard	1,574	3.82	Ø
Total valid votes		41,168		

Beauséjour—Petitcodiac - 2000 Canadian federal election
Party	Candidate	Votes	%	±%
Liberal	Dominic LeBlanc	21,465	47.10	+12.27
Progressive Conservative	Angela Vautour	14,631	32.11	+16.11
Alliance	Tom Taylor	6,256	13.73	+3.55
New Democratic	Inka Milewski	3,217	7.06	-31.93
Total valid votes		45,569		

Beauséjour—Petitcodiac - 1997 Canadian federal election
Party	Candidate	Votes	%	±%
New Democratic	Angela Vautour	18,504	38.99	+33.25
Liberal	Dominic LeBlanc	16,529	34.83	-41.20
Progressive Conservative	Ian Hamilton	7,592	16.00	+0.78
Reform	Raymond Braun	4,833	10.18	Ø
Total valid votes		47,458		
