= Reed Elley =

Canadian politician

Member of Parliament for Nanaimo—Cowichan
- In office 2 June 1997 – 28 June 2004
- Preceded by: Bob Ringma
- Succeeded by: Jean Crowder

Personal details
- Born: 22 July 1945 (age 81) Simcoe, Ontario, Canada
- Party: Conservative (federal); BC Conservative (provincial)
- Spouse: Louise Plester (m. 1967)
- Children: 4

Reed Elley (born 22 July 1945) is a retired Baptist minister who was elected to the Canadian Parliament in 1997 as a member of the Reform Party. He was reelected in 2000 and retired in 2004. Elley was born in Simcoe, Ontario and was educated at McMaster University in Hamilton, where he obtained a BA in History and an M.Div. in theology. He pastored several churches in the Baptist denomination in three provinces, Ontario, Alberta and British Columbia. In 1967, he married Louise Plester from Chemainus, British Columbia and they raised eight children—four children of their own as well as four foster children, three of whom are First Nations. Along with his wife, they fostered more than 155 children. Elley joined the Reform Party of Canada, then led by Preston Manning, in 1988 discovering that his political, social and faith views were very much aligned with Manning whom he admired. His first political activity was in 1992, when he ran a Vote No campaign on behalf of the Reform Party in the federal riding of Calgary Centre during the Charlottetown Accord constitutional referendum which he and the Party won. He then became an area manager for the Reform candidate Jim Silye. During that time he and his family moved to Vancouver Island, where he became involved in the winning campaign of Bob Ringma in 1993. After the election, he was asked to become president of the Nanaimo—Cowichan constituency association for the Reform Party.

He was nominated as the Reform candidate in Nanaimo-Cowichan in 1997 and won in that year's federal election. He was re-elected in 2000 in what the local press described as a landslide win as a member of the Canadian Alliance and ended his career as a member of the Conservative Party of Canada. As MP, he served as deputy critic for Health and Vice-Chair of the Health Committee for three years. He became the senior critic for Indian Affairs and Northern Development under Stockwell Day's leadership. When Stephen Harper became the leader of the Party in 2002, Elley became senior critic for Labour and continued on the Committee for Persons with Disabilities.

Elley was a social conservative whose staunch opposition to same-sex marriage became a source for controversy when he was in Parliament. In 2000, as Parliament debated extending rights to same-sex couples, Elley suggested homosexuality should never have been legalized. Elley blamed former Prime Minister Pierre Trudeau's decision to decriminalize homosexuality in 1969 for what he said was an assault on the traditional family. Elley said: "He and his cohorts passed omnibus legislation which legitimized behavior which up until then had been considered outside the realm of normal." Elley stood by those remarks, later telling a Vancouver Sun reporter: "I presented my views on the breakdown of society as I saw it. … I had deep concerns about the erosion of traditional values and I ... still continue to stand up for traditional family values."

He ran in the 2008 general election but was not successful, finishing second to New Democratic Party candidate Jean Crowder by more than 4,000 votes.

In 2011, he was elected president of the fledgling BC Conservative Party and held the position for a year. Since his retirement from federal politics in 2004, he has held interim pastoral positions in Port Alberni, West Vancouver, Cobble Hill, and Chemainus. He is still active politically and is a past President of the Cowichan—Malahat—Langford Conservative EDA. He resides in Chemainus, BC with his wife Louise.
