= Jean Crowder =

Canadian politician (born 1952)

Jean A. Crowder
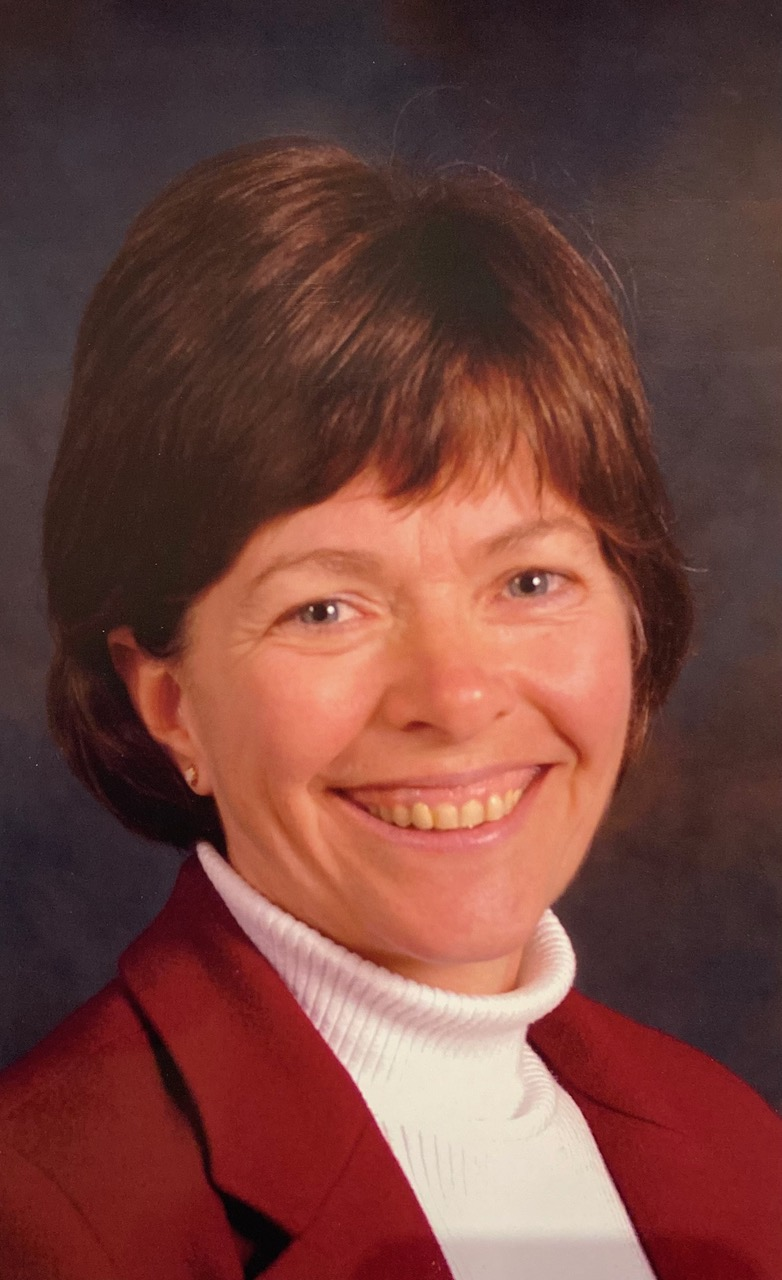

Shadow Minister for Human Resources
- In office May 26, 2011 – April 18, 2012
- Leader: Jack Layton; Nycole Turmel
- Preceded by: Mike Savage
- Succeeded by: Chris Charlton

Chair of the Standing Committee on Access to Information, Privacy and Ethics
- In office 4 October 2011 – 23 April 2012
- Minister: Peter Penashue
- Preceded by: Nathan Cullen
- Succeeded by: Pierre-Luc Dusseault

Member of Parliament for Nanaimo—Cowichan
- In office June 28, 2004 – October 19, 2015
- Preceded by: Reed Elley
- Succeeded by: riding dissolved

Personal details
- Born: July 7, 1952 (age 74) Montreal, Quebec, Canada
- Party: New Democratic Party
- Spouse: divorced
- Profession: human resources consultant, manager

Jean A. Crowder (born July 7, 1952) is a Canadian businesswoman and politician. She served as a Member of Parliament for the New Democratic Party from 2004 until 2015.

== Life and career ==
Crowder was born in Montreal, Quebec. She received a degree in psychology from Wilfrid Laurier University in Waterloo, Ontario.

A human resources consultant and manager by profession, Crowder was elected to the House of Commons of Canada for the first time in the 2004 election as the New Democratic Party (NDP) Member of Parliament for the British Columbia riding of Nanaimo—Cowichan. Before she won federal office, she was a councillor in the District Municipality of North Cowichan from 2003 to 2004. She has worked at Malaspina University-College, Human Resources Development Canada, and the BC Ministry of Skills Training & Labour.

In the NDP's shadow cabinet, she served as the Human Resources and Skills Development Critic, the Critic for Health, Community Economic Development and the Status of Women, and the Critic for Aboriginal Affairs.

In the 2008 federal election, she defeated nearest rival Reed Elley, a former MP running for the Conservatives, by over 4,000 votes. After the election, she announced her support for proportional representation to be utilized during Canada's next election. She did not run in the 2015 federal election. Following the 2012 Canadian federal electoral redistribution, which took effect with the 2015 election, her riding was abolished and its territory transferred to the new ridings Cowichan—Malahat—Langford and Nanaimo—Ladysmith. In that election, New Democrat candidates Alistair MacGregor (a former constituency assistant to Crowder) and Sheila Malcolmson held the new ridings for the party.

After leaving the House, she supported Guy Caron in the 2017 New Democratic Party leadership election.
