= Jan Brown =

Canadian politician

Member of Parliament for Calgary Southeast
- In office October 25, 1993 – June 1, 1997
- Preceded by: Lee Richardson
- Succeeded by: Jason Kenney

Personal details
- Born: June 23, 1947 (age 78) Nanaimo, British Columbia, Canada
- Party: Independent (after 1997)
- Other political affiliations: Reform (until 1996); Progressive Conservative (1997)
- Profession: Teacher

Janet Corinne Brown (born June 23, 1947) is a former Canadian politician. She was first elected as a member of Parliament under the Reform Party of Canada ticket in the Alberta riding of Calgary Southeast in the 1993 federal election. Before entering politics, Brown was a schoolteacher and then agribusiness executive. She is of Croatian descent.

Brown rose to prominence as a well-spoken and moderate member of the Reform Party, becoming Canadian Heritage Critic in its shadow cabinet when it was second Opposition in the 35th Canadian Parliament. She and Stephen Harper were the only two MPs to speak out against the motion to deny same-sex couples the same rights as heterosexual ones at the 1994 Reform convention. She won much admiration for putting a yellow rose on the empty desk of rival Bloc Québécois party leader Lucien Bouchard, who was suffering from a life-threatening illness. The image of the solitary rose on his empty desk was broadcast around the nation. Brown was curious about gender roles within Canadian politics and subsequently wrote an article on the subject.

Later that year she was voted sexiest, best-dressed, and most generous MP by the Hill Times newspaper. Due to her success in questioning Canadian Heritage Minister Michel Dupuy, she was promoted to critic for Human Resources Development Canada.

Early in 1996, however, Brown, along with fellow Reform MP Jim Silye, spoke out openly against the right wing of the party. The remarks were motivated by Art Hanger's planned trip to Singapore to look into the success of caning at deterring crime. While the party leaders acknowledged that Brown and Silye's criticism had weight, they were attacked for publicly criticizing the party. Brown promised to deal with any future concerns within the party, and both she and Silye apologized. The next month, however, Reform MP Bob Ringma mentioned that store owners should be free to move gays and "ethnics" "to the back of the shop", or even to fire them, if it helped their business. A few days later MP David Chatters aroused more controversy when he suggested it would be reasonable to ban homosexuals from teaching children. Party leader Preston Manning and the other top party officials did not censure the remarks or demand apologies from the MPs.

On May 7, 1996, the Reform executive voted to suspend Ringma and Chatters for their remarks but also voted to suspend Brown for speaking out against the party. Brown was disappointed and three days later announced she was quitting the party to sit as an independent. She was especially critical of Preston Manning and how he managed the party.

Brown remained an independent for the rest of the parliament but co-operated closely with the Progressive Conservative Party of Canada. In the 1997 election, she ran as a Progressive Conservative, moving to contest the adjacent riding of Calgary Southwest, then represented by Reform leader Preston Manning.

Despite drawing much attention in the sometimes bitter campaign against her former party leader, Brown lost by a significant margin, and retired permanently from politics. In 2005, she completed a Ph.D. in education and women's studies. She became a lifelong learning consultant and retired in 2013.

Parliament of Canada
Preceded by Lee Richardson	Member of Parliament Calgary Southeast; 1993–1997	Succeeded by Jason Kenney
