= Dave Broda =

Canadian politician

Member of the Legislative Assembly of Alberta
- In office March 11, 1997 – November 22, 2004
- Preceded by: Mary Anne Balsillie
- Succeeded by: District Abolished
- Constituency: Redwater

Personal details
- Born: September 17, 1944
- Died: June 13, 2010 (aged 65) near Mundare, Alberta
- Party: Progressive Conservative

David Mike Broda (September 17, 1944 – June 13, 2010) was a Canadian politician. He served in the Legislative Assembly of Alberta from 1997 to 2004 as a member of the Progressive Conservative caucus.

== Political career ==
Broda ran twice as the Progressive Conservative candidate in the federal electoral district of Beaver River, first in a 1989 by-election upon the death of incumbent John Dahmer and then in the 1993 federal election. He lost both times to Deborah Grey of the Reform Party.

Broda ran in the 1997 Alberta general election as the Progressive Conservative candidate in the electoral district of Redwater. He defeated Liberal incumbent Mary Anne Balsillie by less than 300 votes.

Broda ran for a second term in the 2001 Alberta general election. He easily defeated three other candidates with a landslide majority to hold his seat.

During his time in office he served as chair of the advisory council on Alberta-Ukraine relations.

Broda retired from provincial politics in 2004 at the dissolution of the assembly.

== Late life and death ==
After retiring from provincial politics Broda was appointed by the Government of Alberta to serve on the Alberta Surface Rights Board in April 2005 to serve as Vice-Chairman. His appointed term on the board was scheduled until March 31, 2010.

Broda died in a car crash outside of Edmonton on June 13, 2010, after leaving a barbecue event held on behalf of the Canada-Ukraine Chamber of Commerce in the town of Mundare, Alberta.

== Electoral results ==
Canadian federal by-election, March 13, 1989: Beaver River upon death of John Dahmer
Party	Candidate	Votes	%	±%
Reform	Deborah Grey	11,154	48.70%	+36.50%
Progressive Conservative	Dave Broda	6,912	30.18%	-10.22%
Liberal	Ernie O. Brosseau	2,756	12.03%	-7.13%
New Democratic	Barbara Bonneau	2,081	9.09%	-9.96%
Total valid votes		22,903	100.00%	
Reform gain from Progressive Conservative		Swing		+23.36%

1993 Canadian federal election: Beaver River
Party	Candidate	Votes	%	±%
Reform	Deborah Grey	17,731	57.97%	+9.27%
Liberal	Michael J. Zacharko	7,526	24.6%	+12.57%
Progressive Conservative	Dave Broda	3,855	12.60%	-17.58%
New Democratic	Eugene Houle	1,058	3.46%	-5.63%
Natural Law	Guy C. Germain	294	0.96%	
Independent	B.H. Bud Glenn	94	0.31%	
Total valid votes		30,588	100.00%	
Reform hold		Swing		-1.65%
