= Nanaimo—Cowichan =

Former federal electoral district in British Columbia, Canada

British Columbia electoral district
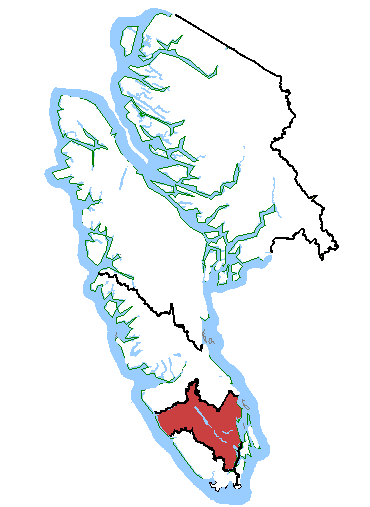
- Nanaimo—Cowichan in relation to other Vancouver Island federal electoral districts.
- Coordinates: 48.836°N 124.063°W

Defunct federal electoral district
- Legislature: House of Commons
- District created: 1987
- First contested: 1988
- Last contested: 2011
- District webpage: profile, map

Demographics
- Population (2011): 131,118
- Electors (2011): 96,034
- Area (km²): 3,849.38
- Census division(s): Cowichan Valley, Nanaimo
- Census subdivision(s): Nanaimo, North Cowichan, Ladysmith, Duncan, Cowichan Valley A, Cowichan Valley B, Cowichan Valley C, Cowichan Valley E, Nanaimo A, Nanaimo B

Nanaimo—Cowichan is a former federal electoral district in British Columbia, Canada, which was represented in the House of Commons of Canada between 1988 and 2015. It was located on Vancouver Island.

== Demographics ==
Population, 2001	116,754
Electors	86,804
Area (km^{2})	
Population density (people per km^{2})	

== Geography ==
It included, together with more rural areas, the southern portion of the city of Nanaimo, the city of Duncan, the town of Ladysmith, and the District of North Cowichan.

== History ==
The electoral district was created in 1987 from parts of Nanaimo–Alberni and Cowichan—Malahat—The Islands ridings. The 2012 electoral redistribution saw this riding dissolved into the new ridings of Cowichan—Malahat—Langford and Nanaimo—Ladysmith for the 2015 election.

=== Members of Parliament ===
This riding has elected the following members of Parliament:

Parliament	Years	Member	Party
Riding created from Nanaimo—Alberni and Cowichan—Malahat—The Islands
34th	1988–1993	David Stupich	New Democratic
35th	1993–1997	Bob Ringma	Reform
36th	1997–2000	Reed Elley	Reform
36th	2000–2000	Reed Elley	Alliance
37th	2000–2003	Reed Elley	Alliance
37th	2003–2004	Reed Elley	Conservative
38th	2004–2006	Jean Crowder	New Democratic
39th	2006–2008	Jean Crowder	New Democratic
40th	2008–2011	Jean Crowder	New Democratic
41st	2011–2015	Jean Crowder	New Democratic
Riding dissolved into Cowichan—Malahat—Langford and Nanaimo—Ladysmith

== Election results ==
2011 Canadian federal election
Party	Candidate	Votes	%	±%	Expenditures
New Democratic	Jean Crowder	31,272	48.90	+3.73	$78,578.51
Conservative	John Koury	24,497	38.31	+0.72	$92,386.72
Green	Anne Marie Benoit	5,005	7.83	–1.74	$3,753.00
Liberal	Brian Fillmore	3,007	4.70	–2.67	$6,509.93
Marxist–Leninist	Jack East	170	0.27	–0.03	none listed
Total valid votes/expense limit		63,951	99.75	–	$99,880.13
Total rejected ballots		162	0.25	–0.00	
Turnout		64,113	64.20	+0.74	
Eligible voters		99,872			
New Democratic hold		Swing		+1.50	
Source: Elections Canada

2008 Canadian federal election
Party	Candidate	Votes	%	±%	Expenditures
New Democratic	Jean Crowder	27,454	45.17	–1.60	$71,475.15
Conservative	Reed Elley	22,844	37.59	+5.46	$82,398.85
Green	Christina Knighton	5,816	9.57	+4.48	$5,908.53
Liberal	Brian Scott	4,483	7.38	–7.94	$18,734.67
Marxist–Leninist	Jack East	182	0.30	+0.06	none listed
Total valid votes/expense limit		60,779	99.74	–	$94,752.71
Total rejected ballots		156	0.26	+0.04	
Turnout		60,935	63.45	–3.18	
Eligible voters		96,034			
New Democratic hold		Swing		–3.53	
Source: Elections Canada

2006 Canadian federal election
Party	Candidate	Votes	%	±%	Expenditures
New Democratic	Jean Crowder	28,558	46.77	+3.06	$54,040.86
Conservative	Norm Sowden	19,615	32.13	–0.65	$76,301.81
Liberal	Brian Scott	9,352	15.32	–0.71	$14,557.29
Green	Harold Henn	3,107	5.09	–1.53	$1,075.67
Canadian Action	Jeffrey Ian Warr	277	0.45	–0.01	$507.10
Marxist–Leninist	Jack East	148	0.24	–	none listed
Total valid votes/expense limit		61,057	99.78	–	$86,598.64
Total rejected ballots		135	0.22	–0.03	
Turnout		61,192	66.63	–0.07	
Eligible voters		91,842			
New Democratic hold		Swing		+1.86	
Source: Elections Canada

2004 Canadian federal election
Party	Candidate	Votes	%	±%	Expenditures
New Democratic	Jean Crowder	25,243	43.71	+26.75	$63,401.06
Conservative	Dave Quist	18,928	32.78	–21.04	$64,071.82
Liberal	Lloyd Macilquham	9,257	16.03	–5.39	$16,671.61
Green	Harold Henn	3,822	6.62	+4.26	$2,345.00
Canadian Action	Jeffrey Ian Warr	270	0.47	–2.49	none listed
Independent	Brunie Brunie	229	0.40	–	$635.34
Total valid votes/expense limit		57,749	99.75	–	$81,576.13
Total rejected ballots		147	0.25	–0.07	
Turnout		57,896	66.70	+2.13	
Eligible voters		86,804			
New Democratic gain from Conservative		Swing		+23.90	
Source: Elections Canada

2000 Canadian federal election
Party	Candidate	Votes	%	±%	Expenditures
Alliance	Reed Elley	23,641	46.63	+1.68	$50,405
Liberal	Marshall Cooper	10,857	21.42	+0.29	$24,987
New Democratic	Garth Mirau	8,599	16.96	–9.02	$33,131
Progressive Conservative	Cynthia-Mary Hemsworth	3,640	7.18	+2.96	$993
Canadian Action	Doug Catley	1,500	2.96	+1.53	$2,916
Marijuana	Meaghan Walker-Williams	1,262	2.49	–	none listed
Green	Norm Abbey	1,196	2.36	+0.52	$990
Total valid votes		50,695	99.68		
Total rejected ballots		164	0.32	–0.08	
Turnout		50,859	64.56	–0.64	
Eligible voters		78,772			
Alliance hold		Swing		+0.70	
Source: Elections Canada

1997 Canadian federal election
Party	Candidate	Votes	%	±%	Expenditures
Reform	Reed Elley	22,685	44.95	+3.73	$44,831
New Democratic	Garth Mirau	13,112	25.98	+6.43	$58,293
Liberal	Michael Garland Coleman	10,663	21.13	–1.38	$19,351
Progressive Conservative	Lindsay Parcells	2,131	4.22	–4.91	$4,777
Green	Karen Margo Shillington	928	1.84	–	$996
Canadian Action	Doug Catley	720	1.43	–	$1,783
Natural Law	Frank S. James Malaka	224	0.44	–0.38	none listed
Total valid votes		50,463	99.59		
Total rejected ballots		206	0.41	–0.06	
Turnout		50,669	65.21	–1.86	
Eligible voters		77,704			
Reform hold		Swing		+2.56	
Source: Elections Canada

1993 Canadian federal election
Party	Candidate	Votes	%	±%
Reform	Bob Ringma	25,339	41.22	+35.23
Liberal	Ron Cantelon	13,840	22.51	+13.10
New Democratic	David Stupich	12,018	19.55	–29.56
Progressive Conservative	Bruce Wilbee	5,614	9.13	–25.18
National	Larry Whaley	3,470	5.64	–
Natural Law	Cliff Brown	507	0.82	–
Libertarian	Mark Alan Chase	245	0.40	–
Independent	Ronald William Jackson	165	0.27	–
Independent	Bruce Tober	158	0.26	–
Canada Party	Neall Lenard	116	0.19	–
Total valid votes		61,472	99.53	
Total rejected ballots		291	0.47	+0.20
Turnout		61,763	67.07	–12.25
Eligible voters		92,093		
Reform gain from New Democratic		Swing		+32.40
Source: Elections Canada

1988 Canadian federal election
Party	Candidate	Votes	%	±%
New Democratic	David Stupich	27,177	49.12	–
Progressive Conservative	Ted Schellenberg	18,984	34.31	–
Liberal	Denis St. Denis	5,210	9.42	–
Reform	George Richard Wrean	3,314	5.99	–
Green	Seymour Trieger	484	0.87	–
Communist	Deborah MacDonald	164	0.30	–
Total valid votes		55,333	99.73	
Total rejected ballots		149	0.27	–
Turnout		55,482	79.32	–
Eligible voters		69,950		
This riding was created from parts of Nanaimo—Alberni and Cowichan—Malahat—The Islands, which elected a Progressive Conservative and a New Democrat, respectively, in the last election. Ted Schellenberg was the incumbent from Nanaimo—Alberni.
Source: Elections Canada

== See also ==
- List of Canadian electoral districts
- Historical federal electoral districts of Canada
