= The New Canada =

- Author: Preston Manning
- Language: English
- Subject: Politics of Canada
- Genre: Political theory, Non-fiction
- Publisher: Macmillan Canada, Inc.
- Publication date: 1992
- Publication place: Canada
- Media type: Print (Hardcover)
- Pages: 373 pp
- ISBN: 0-7715-9150-0
- OCLC: 27684311
- Dewey Decimal: 324.271/0983 20
- LC Class: JL197.R45 M35 1992

The New Canada is a Canadian political literature book written by Reform Party of Canada founder and leader Preston Manning and published by Macmillan Canada. The book explains the personal, religious, and political life of Preston Manning and explains the roots and beliefs of the Reform Party. At the time of its publishing in 1991, Reform had become a popular populist conservative party in Western Canada after the mainstream Progressive Conservative Party of Canada was collapsing in support and in 1991 decided to expand eastward into Ontario and the Maritime provinces. One year later the PC party collapsed in the 1993 federal election, allowing the Reform Party to make political history in Canada, displacing the PCs as the dominant conservative party in Canada. Reform, later renamed the Canadian Alliance, merged with the PC Party in 2003, to form a united right-wing alternative to the governing Liberal Party of Canada, named the Conservative Party of Canada which has dropped many of the populist themes that the Reform Party had.

== Main thesis ==
The book's principal thesis was challenging the dominant notion at the time that Canada was always divided between English and French Canada. Manning claims that the two founding peoples thesis is flawed and the solutions to counter this division have caused more division and proposes a New Canada with a new identity that would solve existing problems, saying,

"The leaders of Canada's traditional federal parties continue to think of our country as "an equal partnership between two founding races, the English and French"—a federation of founding peoples and ethnic groups distinguished by official bilingualism, government-sponsored multiculturalism, and government enterprise. The approach to national unity is to grant special status to those Canadians who feel constitutionally or otherwise disadvantaged. This is Old Canada—and it has become "a house divided against itself...Reformers seek a New Canada—a Canada which may be defined as "a balanced, democratic federation of provinces, distinguished by the sustainability of its environment, the viability of its economy, the acceptance of its social responsibilities, and the recognition of the equality and uniqueness of all of its citizens and provinces." New Canada must include a new deal for aboriginal peoples and a new Senate to address the problem of regional alienation. New Canada must be workable without Quebec, but it must be open and attractive enough to include a New Quebec.

— Manning (1992:viii

== Topics in The New Canada ==
=== History of the democratic populist reform movement in Canada ===
==== Ontario, Nova Scotia, and Quebec ====
Manning credits the populist reform tradition in Canada as not having begun in the west, and mentions its early roots in the reform parties of Upper Canada (Ontario) Lower Canada (Quebec), and Nova Scotia that fought against the rule of colonial elites such as the Family Compact and Château Clique and sought to replace them with responsible governments. Manning praises the province of Quebec for being open to populist politics and populist third party politics. Manning mentions the Bloc Populaire Canadien, the Ralliement créditiste du Québec, the Parti Québécois, and the Bloc Québécois as examples of populist third parties in Quebec.

==== Prairies ====
Manning links his political roots to the Canadian Prairies' tradition of democratic populism. In particular, Manning credits both the Alberta Social Credit Party led by his father, Ernest Manning, who served as Premier of Alberta, and the federal, Western Canada-based Progressive Party of Canada as both being major inspirations to the Reform Party. The author claims that while he came to accept populism as a positive political force, he also developed a "healthy fear of its darker side."

Manning also defends the political actions of Alberta's Social Credit Premier William Aberhart of the 1930s and says that Aberhart was a person dedicated to saving the common people from the disaster of the Great Depression and fought against big business elites to serve the people. Manning claims that the vilification of Aberhart is no different from that of other Western Canadians such as famous Manitoban Métis leader Louis Riel or Frederick W. A. G. Haultain, both of whom were initially vilified but eventually "rehabilitated... about seventy-five years after their death" by historians. Manning claims that the same will be the same for Aberhart.

Manning commends the Alberta Social Credit government's policies of working with local Métis as part of the Metis Population Betterment Act to create new Métis colonies throughout the province. Manning notes the words of Albertan Métis leader Adrien Hope of Kirkino Colony who commended Riel as "the first western Reformer" for having led a grassroots uprising against the federal government to demand the creation of the province of Manitoba in 1870. Manning identified the Progressive Party of the 1920s as being a highly influential and successful federal Western populist party, which he argues may "have perhaps been the most successful third party to emerge on the Canadian federal scene during this century". Manning credits the Progressives for their miraculously fast rise to prominence as well as for their policies of calling for reforms to agricultural policy, tariff policy, transportation policy, and parliamentary practices.

Manning claims that the social democratic Cooperative Commonwealth Federation as led by Tommy Douglas in the province of Saskatchewan is an example of prairie populism.

=== Dangers of extremist politics ===
Manning addresses the dangers of political extremism in response to claims that he and the Reform Party harboured extreme and intolerant views. Manning claims that,

"...everyone with political interests should be required to examine the "dark side of the moon." By this I mean the negative side (or downside of whatever political philosophy one finds attractive, whether it be liberalism, conservatism, socialism, nationalism, or populism."

— Manning 1992:24

Manning claims that as a consultant he occasionally encountered "zealous ideologues of both the right and the left" to whom he advised that they temper their political passions. To ideologue conservatives, Manning recommended that they read The Politics of Cultural Despair: A Study in the Rise of the Germanic Ideology by Fritz Stern who describes "how conservative ideologues in the 1920s inadvertently prepared the way for Hitler and the rise of fascism". To ideologue socialists, Manning recommended that they read The Gulag Archipelago by Aleksandr Solzhenitsyn or read stories about the massacres committed by Pol Pot regime in Cambodia "to get a feel for socialism run amok".

Manning recognizes the prevalence of anti-Semitism which rose in the Alberta Social Credit Party and describes how his father as Social Credit leader actively purged anti-Semites from the party that later resulted in his efforts to purge racists from politics being recognized by receiving the B'nai Brith Humanitarian Award in 1982. Manning claims that like his father, he was seeking to purge racists from the Reform Party. Manning describes his October 1990 speech to Jewish community leaders in Calgary, Alberta, where he assured them that the Reform Party actively sought to purge racial extremists from the party through racially neutral policies.

On the issue of episodes of racism and extremism within the Reform Party, Manning spoke of the serious need to repel the party from absorbing such racism and extremism, saying that,

"If a revival of grassroots democratic populism is to be characteristic of the revitalization of Canadian federal politics of the 1990s, especially in Quebec and the West, it is of primary importance that its leaders be well versed in ways and means of preventing populism from developing racist or other extremist overtones. (This, of course, is also the number-one challenge facing those attempting to lead the reform movements of eastern Europe and the Soviet Union.)"

— Manning (1992:24)

=== Meech Lake Accord ===
Manning describes the reasons for why the Reform Party opposed the Meech Lake Accord that involved granting distinct society status to Quebec. Manning claims that he and the Reform Party went against the Meech Lake Accord because it was discriminatory advocating special powers for the province of Quebec while not advocating similar powers to the other provinces of Canada. Manning points out the hypocrisy of the Meech Lake Accord's advocacy of distinct society for Quebec while ignoring aboriginal Canadians that Manning claims justified aboriginal Manitoba New Democratic Party MLA Elijah Harper's decision to act in the interests of his aboriginal people and in the interests of the popular will of the people of Manitoba in opposing the Meech Lake Accord. Manning condemns then-Prime Minister Brian Mulroney and then-Quebec Premier Robert Bourassa of being deceitful for accusing opponents of Meech Lake such as Newfoundland Premier Clyde Wells, Manitoba Premier Gary Filmon and Elijah Harper of "rejecting Quebec". Manning states that the rejection of Meech Lake was not a rejection of Quebec and that such claims were lies. Manning notes that the Reform Party stood out against the traditional federal political parties (the Liberal, New Democratic, and Progressive Conservative parties) in opposing the accord.

== Reviews and responses ==
In his 1994 Canadian Journal of Political Science article entitled "Preston Manning and the Politics of Postmodernism in Canada", political scientist, Richard Sigurdson, wrote that Manning agreed with Ruben Nelson's 1991 statement that industrial societies' "categorized, institution-based programs delivered by professionals" were "nightmares". The postindustrial New Canada that Manning called for "would involve a shift away from doctors and health-care systems to healthy lives, from schools and educational systems to societal learning, from human rights to responsible relations, from daycare and homemakers to community creators, from bilingualism and multiculturalism to a living Canadian culture, and from inputs measures to desired outcomes." Sigurdson wrote that Manning was part of the new economic service class that were "knowledge-based, technologically oriented", and "entrepreneurial." In The New Canada, Manning repeatedly referred to his 20 years of work experience as a consultant specializing in "systems analysis techniques" where his focus was not on products but on "marketing ideas and concepts." Manning called for Parliament's use of these technocratic "marketplace mechanisms" for "allocating scarce resources", "fiscal responsibility, international competitiveness, and national recognition.
