= Fernand Robichaud =

Canadian politician (born 1939)

The Honourable Fernand Robichaud PC

Deputy Leader of the Government in the Senate
- In office January 26, 2001 – January 14, 2004
- Prime Minister: Jean Chrétien; Paul Martin
- Leader: Sharon Carstairs; Jack Austin
- Preceded by: Dan Hays
- Succeeded by: Bill Rompkey

Secretary of State (Agriculture and Agri-Food, Fisheries and Oceans)
- In office September 15, 1994 – June 10, 1997
- Prime Minister: Jean Chrétien
- Minister: Ralph Goodale; Brian Tobin; David Dingwall (acting); Fred Mifflin
- Preceded by: Gilbert Normand
- Succeeded by: Position abolished

Secretary of State (Parliamentary Affairs)
- In office November 4, 1993 – September 14, 1994
- Prime Minister: Jean Chrétien
- Minister: Herb Gray
- Preceded by: Position established
- Succeeded by: Alfonso Gagliano
Parliamentary constituencies
Canadian Senator from New Brunswick (Saint-Louis-de-Kent; 1997–2010)
In office September 22, 1997 – December 2, 2014
Nominated by	Jean Chrétien
Appointed by	Roméo LeBlanc
Preceded by	Joseph P. Landry
Succeeded by	Multi-member district
Member of Parliament for Beauséjour (Westmorland—Kent; 1984–1988)
In office October 25, 1993 – June 2, 1997
Preceded by	Jean Chrétien
Succeeded by	Angela Vautour (Beauséjour—Petitcodiac)
In office November 21, 1988 – September 24, 1990
Preceded by	Roméo LeBlanc
Succeeded by	Jean Chrétien

Personal details
- Born: December 2, 1939 (age 86) Shippagan, New Brunswick, Canada
- Party: Independent Liberal (since 2014)
- Other political affiliations: Liberal (until 2014)

Fernand Robichaud PC (born December 2, 1939) is a Canadian politician.

He was born in Shippagan, New Brunswick, and received a teaching certificate from the Moncton Technical Institute. Before entering politics, Robichaud was a teacher and businessman. He served on the municipal council for Saint-Louis-de-Kent from 1971 to 1974.

Robichaud was first elected to the House of Commons of Canada in the 1984 election representing the riding of Westmorland—Kent, New Brunswick.

In the 1988 election, he was re-elected representing Beauséjour.

In 1990, he resigned his seat in order to allow newly elected Liberal leader Jean Chrétien to enter the House of Commons through a by-election.

Robichaud served as Special Assistant to the Leader of the Opposition until returning to the House in the 1993 election. With the election of Chrétien as Prime Minister, Robichaud became Secretary of State for Parliamentary Affairs. In 1994, he was appointed Secretary of State for Agriculture and Agri-Food, Fisheries, and Oceans.

Robichaud did not run in the 1997 election and was appointed on Chrétien's recommendation to the Senate of Canada on September 23, 1997.

From 2001 to 2004, he was deputy government leader in the Senate. He later served as vice-chair of the Senate Standing Committee on Agriculture and Forestry.

On January 29, 2014, Liberal Party leader Justin Trudeau announced all Liberal Senators, including Robichaud, were removed from the Liberal caucus, and would continue sitting as Independents. The Senators referred to themselves as the Senate Liberal Caucus even though they were no longer members of the parliamentary Liberal caucus.

He retired from the Senate on December 2, 2014, upon reaching the mandatory retirement age of 75.

26th Canadian Ministry (1993–2003) – Cabinet of Jean Chrétien
Sub-Cabinet Posts (2)
Predecessor	Title	Successor
	Secretary of State (Agriculture and Agri-Food) (Fisheries and Oceans) (1994–1997)	Gilbert Normand
	Secretary of State (Parliamentary Affairs) (1993–1994)	Alfonso Gagliano
Special Parliamentary Responsibilities
Predecessor	Title	Successor
Dan Hays	Deputy Leader of the Government in the Senate; 2001–2004	Bill Rompkey
