= John Dahmer =

Canadian politician

John Roderick Dahmer

Member of Parliament for Beaver River
- In office 21 November 1988 – 26 November 1988
- Preceded by: new district
- Succeeded by: Deborah Grey

Personal details
- Born: 5 September 1937 Red Deer, Alberta, Canada
- Died: 26 November 1988 (aged 51)
- Party: Progressive Conservative
- Occupation: Educator

John Roderick Dahmer (5 September 1937 – 26 November 1988) was elected a member of the House of Commons of Canada in 1988. His background was in education. After working as a schoolteacher, guidance counsellor, and principal, he was later involved in adult education, correctional education and vocational training as a director at Lakeland College.

== Federal election of 1988 ==
He was elected in the 1988 federal election in the new electoral district of Beaver River for the Progressive Conservative Party; however, he was terminally stricken with pancreatic cancer and never served in the 34th Canadian Parliament.

Dahmer had entered Edmonton's Royal Alexandra Hospital on 28 October 1988, after suffering symptoms similar to adult-onset type two diabetes, but the extent of his condition was not widely known until after election night. However, by the time cancer was discovered it was after the deadline to withdraw from the general election, and at that point it was not certain the cancer could not be successfully treated with chemotherapy.

Dahmer died before the Deputy Clerk of the House of Commons could arrive to conduct a swearing-in ceremony, on 26 November (polling day was the 21st of that month). Despite this, parliamentary policy allowed Dahmer's widow to receive a $29,150 severance, which was equivalent to six months' salary in office. This money was used to establish the John Dahmer Community Involvement Scholarship at Lakeland College.

== By-election of 1989 ==
Dahmer's widow, Donna Lynne (née Coulter), ran unsuccessfully for the Progressive Conservative nomination in the resulting by-election, losing to Dave Broda.

Broda lost the by-election to Deborah Grey, the first Reform Party candidate ever elected to the House of Commons. Grey had also been the Reform candidate in the 1988 election, finishing in fourth place.

== Electoral record ==
1988 Canadian federal election: Beaver River
Party	Candidate	Votes	%	±%
Progressive Conservative	John Dahmer	13,768	44.30	–
Liberal	E.J. Ernie Sehn	6,528	21.01	–
New Democratic	Brian Luther	6,492	20.89	–
Reform	Deborah Grey	4,158	13.38	–
Confederation of Regions	Les Johnston	131	0.42	–
Total valid votes		31,077	99.73	
Total rejected ballots		83	0.27	–
Turnout		31,160	71.93	–
Eligible voters		43,320		
Progressive Conservative notional hold		Swing		–
Source: Library of Parliament
