= Bob Ringma =

Canadian politician

Major-General Bob Ringma CD

Member of Parliament for Nanaimo—Cowichan
- In office 25 October 1993 – 1 June 1997
- Preceded by: David Stupich
- Succeeded by: Reed Elley

Personal details
- Born: 30 June 1928 Richmond, British Columbia, Canada
- Died: 31 March 2014 (aged 85) Brockville, Ontario Canada
- Party: Reform
- Spouse: Paula MacDowell (m. 1954; died 2013)
- Children: 3

MGen Robert "Bob" Ringma CD (30 June 1928 – 31 March 2014) was a member of the House of Commons of Canada from 1993 to 1997. By career, he was a soldier for the Canadian Forces.

Born in Richmond, British Columbia, Ringma served in the Canadian Forces, serving during the Korean War. He attained the rank of Major General before leaving the military in 1983. His military experiences in Korea, particularly with the Mobile Laundry and Bath Unit (MLBU), are recounted in his book MLBU Full Monty in Korea (ISBN 1-894263-85-5).

He was elected in the Nanaimo—Cowichan electoral district for the Reform Party in the 1993 general election. In 1996, he attracted controversy when he stated in a newspaper interview that store owners should be free to move gay and black people "to the back of the shop", or even to fire them, if the presence of that individual offended a bigoted customer. Ringma was suspended from the Reform Party caucus for several months after fellow MP Jan Brown spoke out against the prominence of extremist views in the party (although Brown herself was also suspended).

Ringma left politics after serving in the 35th Canadian Parliament and retired to Thetis Island, British Columbia.

Ringma was married to Paula MacDowell, with whom he had three children. He died on 31 March 2014, aged 85.
