= 1989 Beaver River federal by-election =

← 1988	March 13, 1989	1993 →

Riding of Beaver River
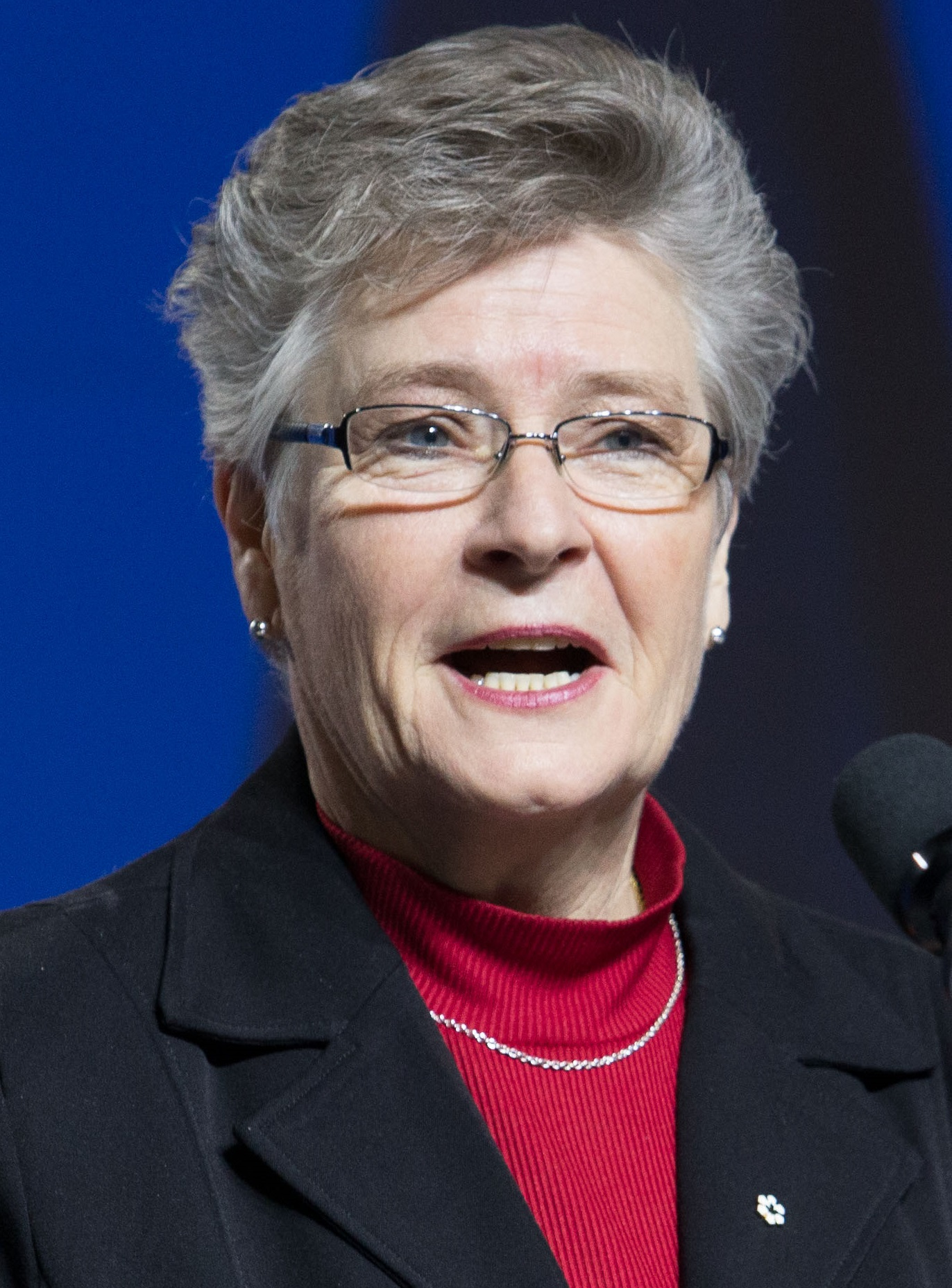
	First party	Second party
		PC
Candidate	Deborah Grey	Dave Broda
Party	Reform	Progressive Conservative
Popular vote	11,154	6,912
Percentage	48.70%	30.18%
Swing	▲36.50pp	▼10.22pp
	Third party	Fourth party
	LPC	NDP
Candidate	Ernie O. Brosseau	Barbara Bonneau
Party	Liberal	New Democratic
Popular vote	2,756	2,081
Percentage	12.03%	9.09%
Swing	▼7.13pp	▼9.96pp
MP before election
Vacant
Elected MP
Deborah Grey
Reform

A by-election was held in the Alberta federal riding of Beaver River on March 13, 1989. The election was triggered by the death of incumbent John Dahmer, who died five days after winning the seat in the 1988 federal election.

Reform candidate Deborah Grey won the by-election, becoming the party's first elected MP.

An exhibit display at the Royal Alberta Museum depicts artefacts from the 1989 by-election, including Grey's motorcycle.

== Results ==
Canadian federal by-election, March 13, 1989: Beaver River upon death of John Dahmer
Party	Candidate	Votes	%	±%
Reform	Deborah Grey	11,154	48.70%	+36.50%
Progressive Conservative	Dave Broda	6,912	30.18%	-10.22%
Liberal	Ernie O. Brosseau	2,756	12.03%	-7.13%
New Democratic	Barbara Bonneau	2,081	9.09%	-9.96%
Total valid votes		22,903	100.00%	
Reform gain from Progressive Conservative		Swing		+23.36%

== 1988 result ==
1988 Canadian federal election: Beaver River
Party	Candidate	Votes	%
Progressive Conservative	John Dahmer	13,768	44.30
Liberal	Ernie Sehn	6,528	21.01
New Democratic	Brian Luther	6,492	20.89
Reform	Deborah Grey	4,158	13.38
Confederation of Regions	Les Johnston	131	0.42
Total valid votes		31,077	100.00
Progressive Conservative notional hold			

== See also ==
- By-elections to the 34th Canadian Parliament
