= Beauséjour (electoral district) =

Federal electoral district in New Brunswick, Canada

New Brunswick electoral district
- Interactive map of riding boundaries from the 2025 federal election
- Coordinates: 46.307°N 64.689°W

Federal electoral district
- Legislature: House of Commons
MP
Dominic LeBlanc
Liberal
- District created: 1966
- First contested: 1968
- Last contested: 2025
- District webpage: profile, map

Demographics
- Population (2021): 88,797
- Electors (2025): 77,308
- Area (km²): 3,995.89
- Pop. density (per km²): 22.2
- Census division(s): Kent, Westmorland
- Census subdivision(s): Dieppe (part), Shediac, Cap-Acadie, Tantramar, Maple Hills (part), Beausoleil, Beaurivage, Grand-Bouctouche, Champdoré, Memramcook

Beauséjour (known from 1997 to 2004 as Beauséjour—Petitcodiac, [boseʒuʁ pətitkɔdjak]) is a federal electoral district (riding) in southeastern New Brunswick, Canada, which has been represented in the House of Commons since 1988. It replaced Westmorland—Kent, which was represented from 1968 to 1988.

Beauséjour is largely Acadian and Francophone, with a significant Anglophone section in the southern section of the riding.

The riding consists of most of Westmorland County to the east and north of Moncton, and a large portion of Kent County. Major towns in the riding include Shediac, Cap-Pelé, Sackville, Bouctouche, Richibucto and the southern and eastern portions of Dieppe. The neighbouring ridings are Miramichi—Grand Lake, Fundy Royal, Moncton—Dieppe, and Cumberland—Colchester in Nova Scotia; it is connected to the riding of Malpeque on Prince Edward Island by the Confederation Bridge.

Since 2000, its member of Parliament (MP) has been Dominic LeBlanc of the Liberal Party.

== Political geography ==
Westmorland—Kent was created in 1966 from Kent, and part of Westmorland that was not included in the Moncton riding. It was abolished when it was incorporated into the new riding of Beauséjour in 1987.

Beauséjour was created in 1987 primarily from Westmorland—Kent, incorporating parts of Moncton and Northumberland—Miramichi ridings. Between a 1990 by-election and 1993, it was the seat of Liberal leader and later Prime Minister Jean Chrétien.

In 1997, it was renamed "Beauséjour—Petitcodiac", and expanded to include most of Albert County and the Petitcodiac area of western Westmorland County. This created a "doughnut" around Greater Moncton, which was a separate district.

In 2003, Beauséjour—Petitcodiac was abolished when it was redistributed into a new Beauséjour riding and into Fundy riding.

The new Beauséjour riding was created primarily from Beauséjour—Petitcodiac, incorporating parts of Miramichi and Moncton—Riverview—Dieppe ridings.

in the 2012 federal electoral redistribution, the riding lost a large portion of western Kent County to Miramichi—Grand Lake and a portion of Moncton Parish to Fundy Royal, but gained a portion of western Dieppe from Moncton—Riverview—Dieppe.

Following the 2022 Canadian federal electoral redistribution, it lost its territory in Moncton to Moncton—Dieppe.

== Demographics ==
Historical population
Year	Pop.	±%
2001	73,871	—
2006	76,279	+3.3%
2011	78,076	+2.4%
2016	82,292	+5.4%
2021	88,797	+7.9%

According to the 2021 Canadian census; 2023 representation

Racial groups: 91.8% White, 3.9% Indigenous, 1.2% Filipino
Languages: 61.3% French, 38.3% English
Religions: 74.5% Christian (58.8% Catholic, 3.5% Baptist, 2.7% United Church, 2.0% Anglican, 7.5% Other), 23.7% No religion
Median income (2020): $39,600
Average income (2020): $47,800

== Political history ==
Former Governor General of Canada Roméo LeBlanc represented Beauséjour from 1972 to 1984. His son, Dominic LeBlanc, is its current MP.

Former Prime Minister Jean Chrétien represented Beauséjour for a short time in the early 1990s after he won the Liberal leadership. Chrétien did not have a seat in the House of Commons at the time, and the sitting MP stepped down to allow him to run in a by-election.

Since its creation, the riding has voted Liberal in every election except 1997, when it elected Angela Vautour of the New Democratic Party. Vautour switched to the Progressive Conservatives midway through her term, and was defeated in 2000.

== Federal riding associations ==
Riding associations are the local branches of the national political parties:

Party	Association name	CEO	HQ city
Conservative Party of Canada	Association du Parti conservateur Beauséjour	Andre Leblanc	Shediac
Green Party of Canada	Beauséjour Green Party Association	John D. Filliter	Cap-Acadie
Liberal Party of Canada	Beauséjour Federal Liberal Association	Francis R. LeBlanc	Dieppe
New Democratic Party	Beauséjour Federal NDP Riding Association	Shannon Cruickshank	Ottawa, Ontario
People's Party of Canada	Northeastern New Brunswick Regional PPC Association	Nancy Mercier	Shediac

== Members of Parliament ==
This riding has elected the following members of Parliament:

Parliament	Years	Member	Party
Westmorland—Kent; Riding created from Kent and Westmorland
28th	1968–1972	Guy Crossman	Liberal
29th	1972–1974	Roméo LeBlanc	Liberal
30th	1974–1979	Roméo LeBlanc	Liberal
31st	1979–1980	Roméo LeBlanc	Liberal
32nd	1980–1984	Roméo LeBlanc	Liberal
33rd	1984–1988	Fernand Robichaud	Liberal
Beauséjour
34th	1988–1990	Fernand Robichaud	Liberal
34th	1990–1993	Jean Chrétien	Liberal
35th	1993–1997	Fernand Robichaud	Liberal
Beauséjour—Petitcodiac
36th	1997–1999	Angela Vautour	New Democratic
36th	1999–2000	Angela Vautour	Progressive Conservative
37th	2000–2004	Dominic LeBlanc	Liberal
Beauséjour
38th	2004–2006	Dominic LeBlanc	Liberal
39th	2006–2008	Dominic LeBlanc	Liberal
40th	2008–2011	Dominic LeBlanc	Liberal
41st	2011–2015	Dominic LeBlanc	Liberal
42nd	2015–2019	Dominic LeBlanc	Liberal
43rd	2019–2021	Dominic LeBlanc	Liberal
44th	2021–2025	Dominic LeBlanc	Liberal
45th	2025–present	Dominic LeBlanc	Liberal

== Election results ==
=== Beauséjour ===
==== 2025 ====
2025 Canadian federal election
Party	Candidate	Votes	%	±%	Expenditures
Liberal	Dominic LeBlanc	36,139	60.60	+5.07	$78,951.57
Conservative	Nathalie Vautour	19,862	33.31	+13.89	$28,755.05
New Democratic	Alex Gagne	1,448	2.43	−8.55	$0.00
Green	Josh Shaddick	1,291	2.16	−3.53	$0.00
People's	Eddie Cornell	503	0.84	−6.74	$25.51
Libertarian	Donna Allen	388	0.65	N/A	$0.00
Total valid votes/expense limit		59,631	99.42	+0.01	$126,723.22
Total rejected ballots		350	0.58	–0.01	
Turnout		59,981	77.36	+9.83	
Eligible voters		77,532			
Liberal notional hold		Swing		−4.41	
Source: Elections Canada
Note: number of eligible voters does not include voting day registrations.

==== 2021 ====
2021 federal election redistributed results
Party	Vote	%
Liberal	27,275	55.54
Conservative	9,538	19.42
New Democratic	5,390	10.97
People's	3,723	7.58
Green	2,797	5.70
Free	390	0.79
Total valid votes	49,113	99.41
Rejected ballots	293	0.59
Registered voters/ estimated turnout	73,154	67.54

2021 Canadian federal election
Party	Candidate	Votes	%	±%	Expenditures
Liberal	Dominic LeBlanc	27,313	55.6	+9.1	$66,501.84
Conservative	Shelly Mitchell	9,526	19.4	+1.8	$14,489.19
New Democratic	Evelyne Godfrey	5,394	11.0	+3.7	$516.68
People's	Jack Minor	3,723	7.6	+5.6	$11,448.76
Green	Stella Anna Girouard	2,798	5.7	−21.0	$864.18
Free	Isabelle Sauriol Chiasson	391	0.8	N/A	$0.00
Total valid votes/expense limit		49,145	99.4	–	$107,726.91
Total rejected ballots		294	0.6		
Turnout		49,439	68.0	−10.0	
Registered voters		72,726			
Liberal hold		Swing		+5.5	
Source: Elections Canada

==== 2019 ====
2019 Canadian federal election
Party	Candidate	Votes	%	±%	Expenditures
Liberal	Dominic LeBlanc	24,948	46.47	−22.54	$83,393.36
Green	Laura Reinsborough	14,305	26.65	+22.16	$74,321.26
Conservative	Vincent Cormier	9,438	17.58	+6.21	$39,043.98
New Democratic	Jean-Marc Bélanger	3,940	7.34	−7.79	none listed
People's	Nancy Mercier	1,054	1.96	New	$6,338.64
Total valid votes/expense limit		53,685	100.0		$101,392.80
Total rejected ballots		475	0.88	+0.28	
Turnout		54,160	77.99	−2.49	
Eligible voters		69,444			
Liberal hold		Swing		−22.35	
Source: Elections Canada

==== 2015 ====
2015 Canadian federal election
Party	Candidate	Votes	%	±%	Expenditures
Liberal	Dominic LeBlanc	36,534	69.02	+28.33	$77,614.48
New Democratic	Hélène Boudreau	8,009	15.13	–8.30	$24,161.02
Conservative	Ann Bastarache	6,017	11.37	–20.35	–
Green	Kevin King	2,376	4.49	+0.32	$1,009.07
Total valid votes/Expense limit		52,936	99.40		$200,494.19
Total rejected ballots		320	0.60		
Turnout		53,256	80.48		
Eligible voters		66,170			
Liberal notional hold		Swing		+18.31	
Source: Elections Canada

2011 federal election redistributed results
Party	Vote	%
Liberal	18,507	40.69
Conservative	14,425	31.71
New Democratic	10,655	23.43
Green	1,896	4.17

==== 2011 ====
2011 Canadian federal election
Party	Candidate	Votes	%	±%	Expenditures
Liberal	Dominic LeBlanc	17,399	39.08	-7.68	$60,854.20
Conservative	Evelyn Chapman	14,811	33.27	+4.12	$75,052.19
New Democratic	Susan Levi-Peters	10,397	23.35	+6.47	$13,825.57
Green	Natalie Arsenault	1,913	4.30	-2.89	$0.00
Total valid votes/Expense limit		44,520	100.0		$84,184.30
Total rejected, unmarked and declined ballots		534	1.19	-0.16	
Turnout		45,054	71.21	+1.96	
Eligible voters		63,267			
Liberal hold		Swing		-5.90	

==== 2008 ====
2008 Canadian federal election
Party	Candidate	Votes	%	±%	Expenditures
Liberal	Dominic LeBlanc	20,059	46.76	-0.95	$56,379.70
Conservative	Omer Léger	12,506	29.15	-3.03	$54,871.67
New Democratic	Chris Durrant	7,242	16.88	+0.13	$7,113.77
Green	Mike Milligan	3,087	7.19	+4.79	$1,748.46
Total valid votes/Expense limit		42,894	100.0		$81,263
Total rejected, unmarked and declined ballots		586	1.35	+0.15	
Turnout		43,480	69.25	-5.97	
Eligible voters		62,790			
Liberal hold		Swing		+1.04	

==== 2006 ====
2006 Canadian federal election
Party	Candidate	Votes	%	±%	Expenditures
Liberal	Dominic LeBlanc	22,012	47.55	-5.73	$58,009.11
Conservative	Omer Léger	14,919	32.23	+4.04	$54,029.29
New Democratic	Neil Gardner	7,717	16.67	+1.96	$10,068.80
Green	Anna Girouard	1,290	2.79	-1.03	$1,869.49
Independent	Frank Comeau	357	0.77	–	$460.29
Total valid votes/Expense limit		46,295	100.0		$75,255
Total rejected, unmarked and declined ballots		561	1.20	-0.50	
Turnout		46,856	75.22	+8.62	
Eligible voters		62,291			
Liberal hold		Swing		-4.88	

==== 2004 ====
2004 Canadian federal election
Party	Candidate	Votes	%	±%	Expenditures
Liberal	Dominic LeBlanc	21,934	53.28	+0.59	$51,654.26
Conservative	Angela Vautour	11,604	28.19	-11.64	$51,129.02
New Democratic	Omer Bourque	6,056	14.71	+7.24	$7,476.46
Green	Anna Girouard	1,574	3.82	–	$1,201.17
Total valid votes/Expense limit		41,168	100.0		$73,195
Total rejected, unmarked and declined ballots		712	1.70		
Turnout		41,880	68.29	-2.28	
Eligible voters		61,327			
Liberal notional hold		Swing		+6.12	
Changes from 2000 are based on redistributed results. Conservative Party change is based on the combination of Canadian Alliance and Progressive Conservative Party totals.

2000 federal election redistributed results
Party	Vote	%
Liberal	21,533	52.69
Progressive Conservative	12,663	30.98
Alliance	3,616	8.85
New Democratic	3,053	7.47
Others	5	0.01

=== Beauséjour—Petitcodiac, 1997–2003 ===
2000 Canadian federal election
Party	Candidate	Votes	%	±%
Liberal	Dominic LeBlanc	21,465	47.10	+12.27
Progressive Conservative	Angela Vautour	14,631	32.11	+16.11
Alliance	Tom Taylor	6,256	13.73	+3.55
New Democratic	Inka Milewski	3,217	7.06	-31.93
Total valid votes		45,569	100.00	

Change for Progressive Conservative candidate Angela Vautour are based on the party's results in 1997. She personally received 6.88% fewer votes based on her results as an NDP candidate. Change for the Canadian Alliance for 1997 are based on the results of its predecessor, the Reform Party.

1997 Canadian federal election
Party	Candidate	Votes	%	±%
New Democratic	Angela Vautour	18,504	38.99	+33.25
Liberal	Dominic LeBlanc	16,529	34.83	-41.20
Progressive Conservative	Ian Hamilton	7,592	16.00	+0.78
Reform	Raymond Braun	4,833	10.18	
Total valid votes		47,458	100.00	

=== Beauséjour, 1987–1997 ===
1993 Canadian federal election
Party	Candidate	Votes	%	±%
Liberal	Fernand Robichaud	29,830	76.03	+24.58
Progressive Conservative	Ian Hamilton	5,970	15.22	-12.02
New Democratic	David Bailie	2,253	5.74	-31.62
National	James Bannister	738	1.88	
Christian Heritage	Mae Boudreau-Pedersen	445	1.13	+0.28
Total valid votes		39,236	100.00	

All changes are from the 1990 by-election, with the exception of the Progressive Conservative Party, who did not field a candidate.

Canadian federal by-election, 10 December 1990
Party	Candidate	Votes	%	±%
On the resignation of Fernand Robichaud, 24 September 1990
Liberal	Jean Chrétien	17,332	51.45	-7.16
New Democratic	Guy Cormier	12,587	37.36	+27.12
Confederation of Regions	Margie Bowes-Legood	2,789	8.28	+4.37
Independent	Alonzo LeBlanc	450	1.34	
Christian Heritage	Mae Boudreau-Pedersen	286	0.85	
Rhinoceros	Bryan Gold	246	0.73	
Total valid votes		33,690	100.00	

1988 Canadian federal election
Party	Candidate	Votes	%	±%
Liberal	Fernand Robichaud	22,650	58.61	+16.86
Progressive Conservative	Omer Léger	10,525	27.24	-10.72
New Democratic	Lyman Dean	3,958	10.24	-10.05
Confederation of Regions	Russell Bowes	1,511	3.91	
Total valid votes		38,644	100.00	

=== Westmorland—Kent, 1966–1987 ===
1984 Canadian federal election
Party	Candidate	Votes	%	±%
Liberal	Fernand Robichaud	14,709	41.75	-25.37
Progressive Conservative	Louis LeBlanc	13,371	37.96	+21.39
New Democratic	Claire Doiron	7,148	20.29	+3.98
Total valid votes		35,228	100.00	

1980 Canadian federal election
Party	Candidate	Votes	%	±%
Liberal	Roméo LeBlanc	21,625	67.12	+3.36
Progressive Conservative	Harvey Mesheau	5,339	16.57	-4.75
New Democratic	René Vannieuwenhuizen	5,255	16.31	+1.39
Total valid votes		32,219	100.00	

1979 Canadian federal election
Party	Candidate	Votes	%	±%
Liberal	Roméo LeBlanc	19,695	63.76	+1.42
Progressive Conservative	Lionel Mills	6,584	21.32	-3.44
New Democratic	René Vannieuwenhuizen	4,609	14.92	+4.58
Total valid votes		30,888	100.00	

1974 Canadian federal election
Party	Candidate	Votes	%	±%
Liberal	Roméo LeBlanc	16,340	62.34	+6.35
Progressive Conservative	Michel Leger	6,490	24.76	-6.02
New Democratic	John LaBossiere	2,710	10.34	+2.35
Social Credit	John Arseneault	671	2.56	-2.68
Total valid votes		26,211	100.00	

1972 Canadian federal election
Party	Candidate	Votes	%	±%
Liberal	Roméo LeBlanc	14,747	55.99	+2.67
Progressive Conservative	Michel Leger	8,107	30.78	-7.48
New Democratic	John LaBossiere	2,104	7.99	-0.44
Social Credit	Henry Landry	1,381	5.24	-
Total valid votes		26,339	100.00	

1968 Canadian federal election
Party	Candidate	Votes	%
Liberal	Guy F. Crossman	11,519	53.32
Progressive Conservative	Frédéric Arseneault	8,265	38.26
New Democratic	John Judson	1,821	8.43
Total valid votes		21,605	100.00

== Student vote results ==
=== 2011 ===
In 2011, a student vote was conducted at participating Canadian schools to parallel the 2011 Canadian federal election results. The vote was designed to educate students and simulate the electoral process for persons who have not yet reached the legal majority. Schools with a large student body that reside in another electoral district had the option to vote for candidates outside of the electoral district then where they were physically located.

2011 Canadian federal election
Party	Candidate	Votes	%
Liberal	Dominic LeBlanc	504	41.96
New Democratic	Susan Levi-Peters	318	26.48
Green	Natalie Arsenault	191	15.90
Conservative	Evelyn Chapman	188	15.65
Total valid votes		1,497	100.00

== See also ==
- List of Canadian electoral districts
- Historical federal electoral districts of Canada
