= Beaver River (federal electoral district) =

Former federal electoral district in Alberta, Canada

Alberta electoral district

Defunct federal electoral district
- Legislature: House of Commons
- District created: 1988
- District abolished: 1997
- First contested: 1988
- Last contested: 1993

Beaver River was a federal electoral district represented in the House of Commons of Canada from 1988 to 1997. It was located in the province of Alberta. This riding was created in 1987 from Athabasca, Pembina and Vegreville, and was first used in the federal election of 1988. It was abolished in 1996, with its area becoming part of Lakeland.

The 1989 by-election was won by the Reform Party of Canada.

== Members of Parliament ==
Beaver River
Parliament	Years	Member	Party
Riding created from Athabasca, Pembina and Vegreville
34th	1988–1988	John Dahmer	Progressive Conservative
34th	1989–1993	Deborah Grey	Reform
35th	1993–1997	Deborah Grey	Reform
Riding dissolved into Lakeland

== Electoral history ==
1988 Canadian federal election
Party	Candidate	Votes	%	±%
Progressive Conservative	John Dahmer	13,768	44.30	–
Liberal	E.J. Ernie Sehn	6,528	21.01	–
New Democratic	Brian Luther	6,492	20.89	–
Reform	Deborah Grey	4,158	13.38	–
Confederation of Regions	Les Johnston	131	0.42	–
Total valid votes		31,077	99.73	
Total rejected ballots		83	0.27	–
Turnout		31,160	71.93	–
Eligible voters		43,320		
Progressive Conservative notional hold		Swing		–
Source: Library of Parliament

Canadian federal by-election, March 13, 1989 upon death of John Dahmer
Party	Candidate	Votes	%	±%
Reform	Deborah Grey	11,154	48.70	+35.32
Progressive Conservative	Dave Broda	6,912	30.18	–14.12
Liberal	Ernie O. Brosseau	2,756	12.03	–8.97
New Democratic	Barbara Bonneau	2,081	9.09	–11.80
Total valid votes		22,903	99.76	
Total rejected ballots		56	0.24	–0.02
Turnout		22,959	52.06	–19.87
Eligible voters		44,105		
Reform gain from Progressive Conservative		Swing		+23.36
Source: Library of Parliament

1993 Canadian federal election
Party	Candidate	Votes	%	±%
Reform	Deborah Grey	17,725	58.00	+9.30
Liberal	Michael J. Zacharko	7,542	24.68	+12.65
Progressive Conservative	Dave Broda	3,854	12.61	–17.57
New Democratic	Eugene Houle	1,050	3.44	–5.65
Natural Law	Guy C. Germain	294	0.96	–
Independent	B.H. Bud Glenn	94	0.31	–
Total valid votes		30,559	99.64	
Total rejected ballots		111	0.36	+0.12
Turnout		30,670	66.89	+14.83
Eligible voters		45,853		
Reform hold		Swing		+10.97
Source: Library of Parliament

== See also ==
- List of Canadian electoral districts
- Historical federal electoral districts of Canada
