= Deborah Grey =

Canadian politician (born 1952)

The Honourable Deborah Grey PC OC
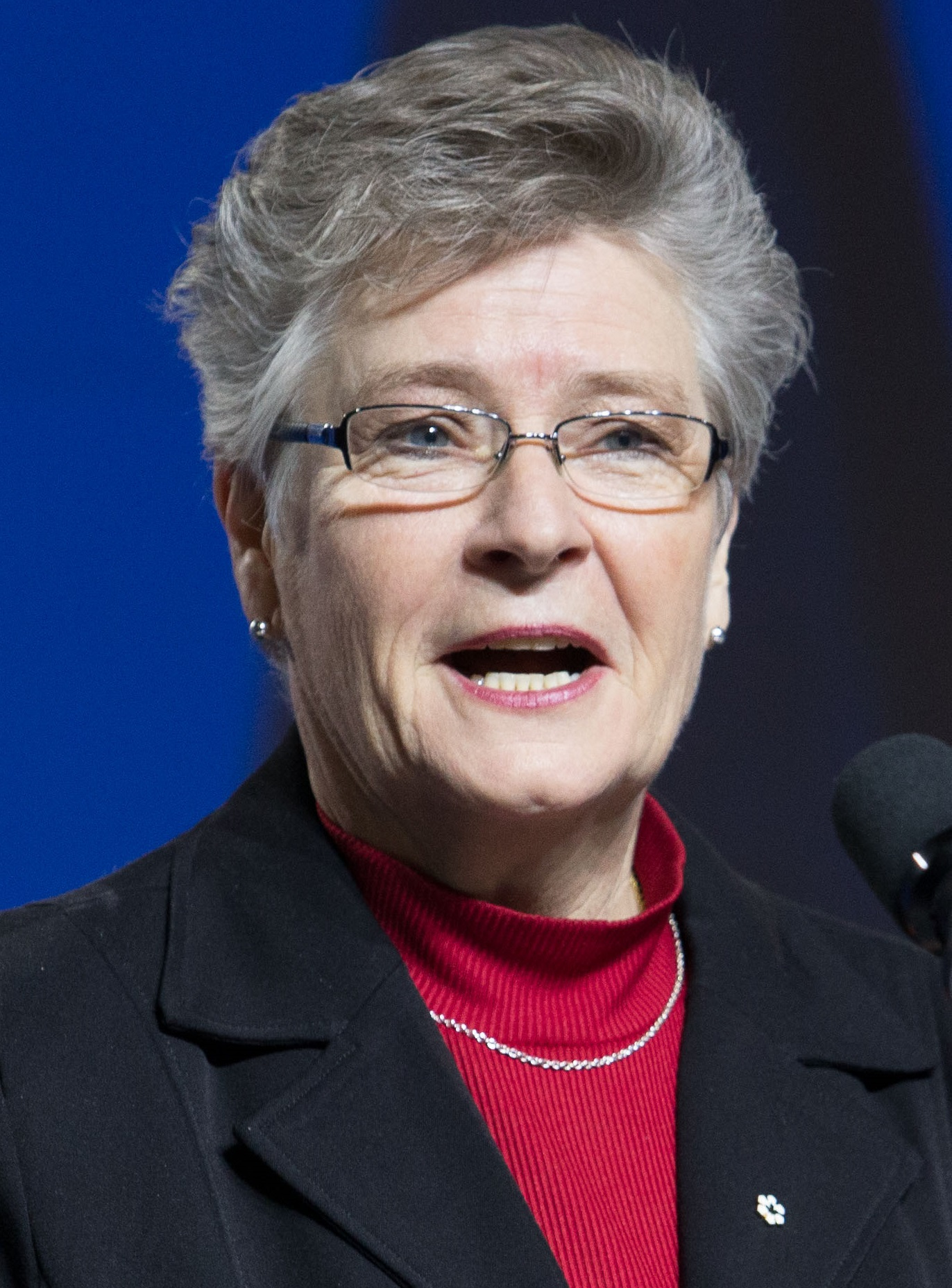
- Grey in 2014

Acting Chairman of the Security Intelligence Review Committee
- In office January 24, 2014 – May 1, 2015
- Appointed by: Stephen Harper
- Preceded by: Chuck Strahl
- Succeeded by: Pierre Blais

Leader of the Opposition
- In office March 27, 2000 – September 10, 2000
- Preceded by: Preston Manning
- Succeeded by: Stockwell Day

Interim Leader of the Canadian Alliance
- In office March 27, 2000 – July 8, 2000
- Preceded by: Preston Manning (as Leader of the Reform Party)
- Succeeded by: Stockwell Day

Member of Parliament for Edmonton North (Beaver River; 1989–1997)
- In office March 13, 1989 – June 28, 2004
- Preceded by: John Dahmer (1988)
- Succeeded by: Riding abolished

Personal details
- Born: Deborah Cleland Grey; July 1, 1952 (age 74) Vancouver, British Columbia, Canada
- Party: Conservative (2003–present)
- Other political affiliations: Reform (1989–2000); Canadian Alliance (2000–2001, 2002–2003); Democratic Representative Caucus (2001–2002)
- Spouse: Lewis Larson (m. 1993)
- Profession: Politician; teacher

Deborah Cleland Grey (born July 1, 1952) is a retired Canadian politician who served as the leader of the Official Opposition in 2000, from March to September. Grey was elected to the House of Commons in 1989, serving as the member of Parliament (MP) for Beaver River until 1997 and MP for Edmonton North until 2004. Grey was a member of the Reform Party. When Reform merged with the Canadian Alliance in 2000, she served as the interim party leader, making her the first woman to serve as leader of the Opposition. She currently serves on the advisory board of the Leaders' Debates Commission.

== Before politics ==
Born in Vancouver, British Columbia, Grey pursued studies in sociology, English and education at Burrard Inlet Bible Institute, Trinity Western College and the University of Alberta, however she did not complete a bachelor’s degree. She then worked as a teacher in a number of rural Alberta communities until 1989.

== Political career ==
A display at the Royal Alberta Museum depicts artifacts from her campaign in the 1989 by-election, including her motorcycle

Grey's first run for office was in the 1988 election, when she ran as the Reform candidate in Beaver River, a mostly rural riding in northeastern Alberta. She finished a distant fourth behind Progressive Conservative John Dahmer. However, Dahmer died before he could be sworn in. Grey won a by-election in March 1989, almost tripling her vote total from the 1988 election to become Reform's first MP. It was only the second time the Progressive Conservatives had lost a seat in Alberta since 1968. (Note: Prior to Grey, the Conservatives lost 2 seats in Calgary South and Edmonton Strathcona in the 1968 election, to Liberals' Pat Mahoney and Hu Harries) Party leader Preston Manning immediately named her as Reform's deputy leader. The two were friends for many years; Grey calls him "Misterbrainiola". Her first legislative assistant was a young Stephen Harper.

Reform elected 52 MPs in the 1993 election, replacing the Progressive Conservatives as the main right-wing party in Canada. Grey won her first full term in this election. In addition to her duties as deputy leader, she also became chairwoman of the enlarged Reform caucus. In 1997, Beaver River was abolished and its territory split into two neighbouring ridings. Grey moved to Edmonton North at the request of several local conservatives dissatisfied with being represented by a Liberal, John Loney (elected in the 1993 landslide). Loney retired ahead of that year's election, and Grey won handily. She continued to represent this riding for the remainder of her career. Reform became the Official Opposition in that election.

Grey served as Reform's deputy leader and caucus chairwoman until March 2000, when the Reform Party was folded into the Canadian Alliance. When Manning stepped down as Leader of the Opposition to contest the Alliance leadership race, Grey was appointed interim leader of the Alliance, and hence Leader of the Opposition. She was the first female Leader of the Opposition in Canadian history. She held the post until new Alliance leader Stockwell Day was elected to the House of Commons in September 2000. He appointed Grey as deputy leader and caucus chairwoman once again.

Grey resigned those posts on April 24, 2001, in protest against Day's leadership. In July of that year, Grey quit the Canadian Alliance and joined 10 other Alliance dissidents in the "Independent Alliance Caucus". While Chuck Strahl eventually emerged as the dissidents' leader, Grey lent the group instant credibility since she had been Reform/Alliance's matriarch as well as the deputy leader. When Day offered an amnesty to the dissidents, Grey was one of seven who turned it down and formed the Democratic Representative Caucus (DRC), led by Strahl with Grey as deputy leader. In September 2001, the DRC formed a coalition caucus with the Progressive Conservatives, and Grey served as chairwoman of the PC-DRC caucus. She later said that she lost confidence in Day after seeing him attack his staffers after a public gaffe.

In April 2002, after Harper defeated Day in the race to be the Alliance leader, Grey and all but two of the DRC MPs rejoined the Alliance caucus, and in December 2003, the Alliance and the Progressive Conservatives ratified an agreement to merge into the Conservative Party of Canada. Grey was co-chair, with former PC leader Peter MacKay, of the new party's first leadership convention in March 2004.

Grey was not shy about tossing verbal barbs at the governing Liberals. She called Jean Chrétien "the Shawinigan Strangler", Don Boudria "Binder Boy", Jane Stewart "Miss Management" and Paul Martin "Captain Whirlybird".

Deborah Grey is also well known for refusing to join the lucrative MP Pension Plan and ridiculing other "MP porkers" for feeding at the public trough. Later she bought her way back into the pension plan resulting in former Prime Minister Joe Clark labelling her the "high priestess of hypocrisy".

Grey's riding of Edmonton North was abolished for the 2004 federal election, and Grey retired from politics rather than attempting nomination in another. She was Western chairwoman of the Conservative campaign in the 2006 election, in which Harper became Prime Minister of Canada.

== Retirement ==
Shortly after retiring, she published her autobiography, Never Retreat, Never Explain, Never Apologize: My Life and My Politics. In 2007, she was made an Officer of the Order of Canada. On April 22, 2013, she was appointed to the Security Intelligence Review Committee, and along with that appointment, was made a Privy Councillor, giving her the title, "The Honourable". It was announced that Grey was stepping down from the Security Intelligence Review Committee on May 1, 2015, in a press release from the Prime Minister's Office.

== Personal life ==
Grey has been married to Lewis Larson since August 7, 1993; they have no children together. They are grandparents through Lewis' children by his first marriage.

== Election results ==
2000 Canadian federal election: Edmonton North
Party	Candidate	Votes	%	±	Expenditures
Alliance	Deborah Grey	22,063	51.21%		$61,317
Liberal	Jim Jacuta	14,786	34.32%		$28,846
New Democratic Party	Laurie Lang	3,216	7.46%		$815
Progressive Conservative	Dean Sanduga	3,010	6.98%		$9,842
Total valid votes		43,075	100.00%		
Total rejected ballots		174	0.40%		
Turnout		43,249	57.20%		

1997 Canadian federal election: Edmonton North
Party	Candidate	Votes	%	±	Expenditures
Reform	Deborah Grey	16,124	44.30%		$56,921
Liberal	Jonathan Murphy	11,820	32.47%		$46,517
New Democratic Party	Ray Martin	5,413	14.87%		$60,286
Progressive Conservative	Mitch Panciuk	2,811	7.72%		$51,169
Natural Law	Ric Johnsen	226	0.62%		
Total valid votes		36,394	100.00%		
Total rejected ballots		99	0.27%		
Turnout		36,493	55.63%		

1993 Canadian federal election: Beaver River
Party	Candidate	Votes	%	±%
Reform	Deborah Grey	17,731	57.97%	+9.27%
Liberal	Michael J. Zacharko	7,526	24.6%	+12.57%
Progressive Conservative	Dave Broda	3,855	12.60%	−17.58%
New Democratic	Eugene Houle	1,058	3.46%	−5.63%
Natural Law	Guy C. Germain	294	0.96%	
Independent	B. H. Bud Glenn	94	0.31%	
Total valid votes		30,588	100.00%	
Reform hold		Swing		−1.65%

Canadian federal by-election, March 13, 1989: Beaver River upon death of John Dahmer
Party	Candidate	Votes	%	±%
Reform	Deborah Grey	11,154	48.70%	+36.50%
Progressive Conservative	Dave Broda	6,912	30.18%	−10.22%
Liberal	Ernie O. Brosseau	2,756	12.03%	−7.13%
New Democratic	Barbara Bonneau	2,081	9.09%	−9.96%
Total valid votes		22,903	100.00%	
Reform gain from Progressive Conservative		Swing		+23.36%

1988 Canadian federal election: Beaver River
Party	Candidate	Votes	%	±%
Progressive Conservative	John Dahmer	13,768	44.30	–
Liberal	E.J. Ernie Sehn	6,528	21.01	–
New Democratic	Brian Luther	6,492	20.89	–
Reform	Deborah Grey	4,158	13.38	–
Confederation of Regions	Les Johnston	131	0.42	–
Total valid votes		31,077	99.73	
Total rejected ballots		83	0.27	–
Turnout		31,160	71.93	–
Eligible voters		43,320		
Progressive Conservative notional hold		Swing		–
Source: Library of Parliament
