= Reform Party of Canada =

Federal political party (1987–2000)

Reform Party of Canada Parti réformiste du Canada
- Founder: Preston Manning
- Founded: October 30, 1987
- Dissolved: March 27, 2000
- Succeeded by: Canadian Alliance
- Ideology: Conservatism; Social conservatism; Fiscal conservatism; Economic liberalism; Right-wing populism
- Political position: Right-wing
- Colours: Green

The Reform Party of Canada (French: Parti réformiste du Canada) was a right-wing populist and conservative federal political party in Canada that existed from 1987 to 2000. Reform was founded as a Western Canada-based protest movement that eventually became a populist conservative party, with strong social conservative and fiscal conservative elements. It was initially motivated by profound Western Canadian discontent with the Progressive Conservative Party (PC Party) government of Brian Mulroney.

Led by its founder Preston Manning throughout its existence, Reform was considered a populist movement that rapidly gained popularity and momentum in Western Canada during the late 1980s and early 1990s. In addition to attracting social conservatives, the party was popular among Western Canadians who were disillusioned with Mulroney's perceived prioritization of Quebec (during his attempts to reform the Constitution) as well as fiscal conservatives who were critical of the Mulroney government's tax increases and inability to reduce the budget deficit. In a 1989 by-election, Reform won its first-ever seat in the House of Commons before making a major electoral breakthrough in the 1993 federal election, when it supplanted the PCs as the largest conservative party in Canada. In opposition, the party advocated for spending restraint, tax cuts, reductions in immigration, and wider reform of Canada's political institutions such as the Senate. In the 1997 federal election, the party attempted to make a national breakthrough by running candidates in all provinces and territories. Although they became the Official Opposition, a Liberal majority and disappointment with the lack of Eastern seats led many members to question the future direction of the party.

In an attempt to move beyond its Western Canadian regional base and broaden its platform to encompass ideas from Eastern Canada, the party changed its name to the Canadian Alliance in 2000. That same year, the Alliance lost an election to a third Liberal majority. In 2003, the Unite the Right movement culminated in the Alliance merging with the Progressive Conservative Party to form the modern-day Conservative Party of Canada. Reform's impact on the Conservative Party's leaders and policies has been significant; three of its four permanent leaders were once Reform Party members.

== History ==
=== Political roots and background ===
Prior to World War I, Western Canada featured broadly the same political climate as the rest of the country, with a two-party system consisting of the Liberal and Conservative parties. Following the conflict, regional parties began to be seen as more effective at representing Western interests at the federal level, including the Progressive Party and United Farmers of Alberta, and later the Social Credit Party and Co-operative Commonwealth Federation. This continued until the 1958 Canadian federal election, when the landslide victory of the Progressive Conservatives (PC) under Western populist Prime Minister John Diefenbaker largely eliminated Social Credit as a serious competitor in Western Canada (albeit its provincial branches in Alberta and British Columbia dominated their legislative assemblies until 1970 and 1991 respectively), and left political contests in the region largely polarised between the Progressive Conservatives and the CCF's successor, the New Democratic Party.

Social Credit continued to provide a nominal alternative to the Progressive Conservatives for right-wing voters, but from 1968 onwards the party would only successfully elect MPs in Quebec, and the 1979 federal election saw its complete collapse as a political force. Some former Social Credit members attempted to form the Confederation of Regions Party as another alternative right-wing party, with Western alienation (which had been largely ignored by Social Credit in their final years in favour of a focus on Quebec issues) as a key platform plank. While they made little headway against the Progressive Conservatives, who won another landslide victory in 1984, they had one of the stronger performances among the minor parties that year.

In May 1987, a conference called "A Western Assembly on Canada's Economic and Political Future" was held in Vancouver, British Columbia. This conference led to the formation of the Reform Party in Winnipeg in October of that year. The party's founding occurred as the coalition of Western Prairie populists, Quebec nationalists, Ontario business leaders, and Atlantic Red Tories that made up Brian Mulroney's Progressive Conservative Party began to fracture.

The party was the brainchild of a group of discontented Western interest groups who were upset with the PC government and the lack of a voice for Western concerns at the national level. Leading figures in this movement included Ted Byfield, Stan Roberts, Francis Winspear, and Preston Manning. A major intellectual impetus at the time was provided by Peter Brimelow's 1986 book, The Patriot Game. They believed the West needed its own party if it was to be heard. Their main complaints against the Mulroney government were its alleged favouritism towards Quebec, lack of fiscal responsibility, and a failure to support a program of institutional reform (for example, of the Senate). The roots of this discontent lay mainly in their belief that a package of proposed constitutional amendments, called the Meech Lake Accord, failed to meet the needs of Westerners and Canadian unity overall.

=== 1987–1990: Foundation and early success ===
Logo of the Reform Party of Canada from the late 1980s to early 1990s.

The Reform Party was founded in October 1987 at a convention in Winnipeg, Manitoba led by three principal organizers: Preston Manning, son of Alberta premier Ernest Manning; Stan Roberts, former Liberal Party MLA; and Robert Muir, former president of the Canadian Petroleum Law Foundation. On November 1, 1987, at the convention, Manning was unanimously named leader after Roberts left the convention in protest over the new party's finances. The party's delegates discussed a variety of topics to formulate policies such as calling for the party to endorse a Triple-E Senate amendment to be added to the Meech Lake Accord, advocating the addition of property rights into the Charter of Rights and Freedoms, and other issues such as "provincial resource rights, deficit reduction, free trade, economic diversification, welfare reform, and regional fairness in federal procurements". The convention briefly discussed the contentious topic of western separation, which was not a serious concern as most of the delegates rejected the idea and Manning stated that he would refuse to lead a western separatist party and went on to say "We want to tell the rest of the country not that the West is leaving, but that the West is arriving."

The party fought in the 1988 federal election, but was never considered more than a fringe element, and none of its 72 candidates won election. However, the party ran second to the governing Tories in many Western ridings and earned 2.1% of the total national vote. The party clearly identified itself as a Western-based political party in 1988 with its slogan "The West Wants In". The party advocated controversial policies such as its opposition to official bilingualism and multiculturalism and its opposition for distinct society status for Quebec, which all mainstream political parties at the time supported.

In 1989, following the sudden death of John Dahmer, PC MP for Beaver River in Alberta, the Reform Party gained its first MP when Deborah Grey won the resulting by-election. Grey had finished fourth in the 1988 election. As the party's first MP, she was named Reform's deputy leader, a position she held for the remainder of the party's history. Also in 1989, Stanley Waters won Alberta's first senatorial election under the banner of the Reform Party of Alberta. In 1990, he became Reform's first (and only) federal Senator, remaining in office until his untimely death one year later. Waters' appointment, following his election victory, has led some to describe him as Canada's first elected senator.

=== 1991–1993: Breakthrough ===
English version logo of the Reform Party, adopted in 1991.

French version logo of the Reform Party, adopted in 1991.

In 1991 and 1992, support for Reform rose not only in Western Canada, but in other parts of Canada as well, including Ontario. The party took note of this new support and changed its position from being a Western-based political party to being a national party. However, it did not stand candidates in Quebec in the 1993 election, as there was little support from francophone Quebecers due to Reform's opposition to a distinct society clause for Quebec.

In 1992, the Mulroney government made another attempt at amending Canada's constitution. The Charlottetown Accord was even more ambitious than the Meech Lake Accord, but it failed to win support in a nationwide referendum. The Reform Party was one of the few groups to oppose the accord. The constitutional debacle, together with unpopular initiatives such as the introduction of a Goods and Services Tax (GST) and a series of high-profile scandals, contributed to the implosion of the Progressive Conservatives' "grand coalition" ahead of the 1993 election.

The Reform Party achieved a major breakthrough in the 1993 federal election. The Progressive Conservatives suffered the worst defeat ever for a governing party at the federal level, falling from 151 to only two seats, while the Liberals under Jean Chrétien won a majority government. Reform was the major beneficiary of the Tory collapse: with few exceptions, the PCs' Western support transferred en masse to Reform. It won all but four seats in Alberta and dominated British Columbia as well. The party also won four seats in Saskatchewan and one seat in Manitoba. Besides taking over nearly all of the PC seats in the West, Reform also won several ridings held by the social democratic New Democratic Party (NDP). Despite sharp ideological differences, Reform's populism struck a responsive chord with many NDP voters who were dissatisfied with Audrey McLaughlin's leadership. Ultimately, Reform won 52 seats — just two behind the Bloc Québécois, which became the Official Opposition — and came second in the nationwide popular vote, with 16%.

However, Reform did not do as well as hoped east of Manitoba. It was entirely shut out of Atlantic Canada – a region where a much more moderate strain of conservatism has traditionally prevailed. Many Red Tory voters in both Atlantic Canada and Ontario were fed up with the PCs, but found Reform's agenda too extreme and shifted to the Liberals. Despite strong support in rural Ontario, vote splitting with the PCs meant that Reform won only one seat, Simcoe Centre. As it turned out, this was Reform's only victory east of Manitoba, ever.

=== 1994–1999: In Parliament ===
In one election, the Reform Party had effectively replaced the Progressive Conservative Party as the major right-wing party in Canada. Despite not forming the Official Opposition, the Liberals treated Reform as their main opposition on issues that were not specific to Quebec. When Bloc leader Lucien Bouchard's position as Leader of the Opposition granted him a meeting with visiting US President Bill Clinton, Manning was also given a meeting with Clinton in order to defuse Bouchard's separatist leverage.

Reform's ambitions of becoming a national party and spreading into the east, particularly into Ontario, were helped by the rise of Ontario Progressive Conservative Premier Mike Harris to power in 1995. Harris' Common Sense Revolution agenda shared much of Reform's fiscally neoliberal ideology, including deep spending cuts, privatization of social services, and tax cuts. The party continued to show its ties to Harris as a means to diminish support for the federal PC Party.

Reform claimed credit for pressuring the Liberal government to initiate spending cuts and focus on deficit reduction in 1995, though the party had wanted even deeper cuts. It also managed to put forward its own strategy for national unity after the slim federalist victory in the 1995 Quebec referendum on sovereignty, which advocated deep decentralization of powers from the federal government to the provinces and territories. Manning was criticized, however, for not appearing at federalist rallies in Quebec, as Prime Minister Chrétien and new Progressive Conservative leader Jean Charest had done.

Despite some steps forward, Reform came under considerable attack during its tenure in Parliament from 1994 to 1997. The party's staunch social conservative stances on bilingualism, immigration, abortion, gay rights, women's rights, minority rights, and aboriginal rights led to a large number of Reform MPs making statements that were considered to be intolerant.

English version of the Reform Party "wave" logo adopted in 1996.

French version of the Reform Party "wave" logo adopted in 1996.

From 1996 to the 1997 election, the party's executive tried to refurbish the party's image and shed its controversial past. A number of ethnic minorities were sought out as Reform candidates for the upcoming 1997 election. Also, Reform changed tactics by running a candidate in every province in Canada, including Quebec. The party increased its total seats to 60 and became the Official Opposition. Despite this breakthrough, however, Reform failed to win any seats east of Manitoba, even losing the one Ontario seat they had. Reform was considerably hampered in its efforts to reach Francophone voters because of Manning's inability to speak fluent French. There was also a perception of the party as being anti-Quebec due to its position on official bilingualism and its opposition to the Meech Lake Accord.

During this time, Reform again came under fire for ostensibly being extremist. The party ran an election ad in which the faces of four key Quebec leaders (Prime Minister Chrétien, PC leader Charest, former Bloc Québécois chief Lucien Bouchard, and new Bloc leader Gilles Duceppe) were crossed out, saying that Canada had been governed too long by Quebec politicians. The response to this ad was negative, and the leaders of the other parties claimed that the ad was an attack on Quebec and that Manning was a bigot.

Disillusionment with the traditional political parties in general had been the impetus behind Reform's initial growth, but that growth was now felt to have stalled. Its populist claims were called into question in 1997, when Manning accepted an offer to live at Stornoway, the official residence provided to the leader of the Official Opposition. Manning had previously said that Stornoway was a waste of taxpayer money and that he would not reside there.

In 1997, the Reform Party had also failed to establish itself as the clear right-wing alternative to the Liberal Party. The Progressive Conservative Party, which had been steadily rebuilt under Charest, enjoyed a modest revival in the 1997 election. It won 20 seats, up from the two it had won in the 1993 election, and regained official party status. Some political pundits claimed that it was a divided right which allowed the Liberals to gain a second majority government, and claimed that if the two parties did not put away their differences, the result could repeat itself.

Manning recognized the frustration by Canada's right-wing proponents and began discussions towards the launch of a new pan-Canadian party, using "United Alternative" ("UA") forums to bring grassroots Reformers together with Tories. The goal was to create a small-c conservative political alternative to the Liberals that could woo Ontarian and Atlantic Canadian voters. Manning was supported by the more right-of-centre "Focus Federally For Reform," while "Grassroots United Against Reform's Demise" ("GUARD") opposed the initiative. The United Alternative proposal created a strong debate in the Reform Party. Manning himself wrote a letter to the effect that he did not want to lead Reform anymore, but would only lead a new party. A leadership review in 1998 managed to officially put aside the differences, with Manning winning a large majority in support of his leadership. Afterwards, Reform steadily progressed towards creating the United Alternative.

=== 2000: Rebranding and aftermath ===
The outcome was the renaming of the Reform Party effective March 27, 2000, as the Canadian Alliance (officially the Canadian Reform Conservative Alliance). Manning stood in the first leadership race for the new party, but lost to the younger and more charismatic Stockwell Day, the treasurer (finance minister) and deputy premier of Alberta. Though the Canadian Alliance was intended to attract a broader base of right-of-centre voters, former Reform members dominated the newly named party. As a result, the Alliance was widely seen as a renamed Reform Party.

In the 2000 election, the Alliance increased its share of the popular vote to 25%, and gained six seats, including two in Ontario. However, the failure to win more than the two seats in Ontario led to questions over Day's leadership and calls for greater cooperation with the Progressive Conservative Party. Ultimately, in 2003, the two parties merged to form the new Conservative Party of Canada.

The change of identity to "Canadian Alliance", and its eventual merger in to the Conservative Party, alienated some of the old Reform populists, who saw the merger as the final demise of the former Reform Party and the return of Tory indifference to western Canadian concerns. This led to the creation of a new "Reform Association of Canada". "Bring Back Real Reform" also was created by a fringe group of original Reformers from Ontario, with the aim of bringing back a federal Reform Party. Under the tag "Operation Back to the Future", it was launched in Spring 2005 as an umbrella for all original Reformers across the nation who felt that they were still without a political home. Neither of these groups attracted any support.

== Policies ==
A cornerstone of the Reform Party's agenda was the rejection of the belief that Canada is a divided country, with division existing between English and French Canada. Instead, Preston Manning called for a "New Canada" with a new identity that would solve existing problems. In his book The New Canada (1992), Manning stated:

The leaders of Canada's traditional federal parties continue to think of our country as "an equal partnership between two founding races, the English and French"—a federation of founding peoples and ethnic groups distinguished by official bilingualism, government-sponsored multiculturalism, and government enterprise. The approach to national unity is to grant special status to those Canadians who feel constitutionally or otherwise disadvantaged. This is Old Canada—and it has become "a house divided against itself".

Reformers seek a New Canada—a Canada which may be defined as "a balanced, democratic federation of provinces, distinguished by the sustainability of its environment, the viability of its economy, the acceptance of its social responsibilities, and the recognition of the equality and uniqueness of all of its citizens and provinces". New Canada must include a new deal for aboriginal peoples and a new Senate to address the problem of regional alienation. New Canada must be workable without Quebec, but it must be open and attractive enough to include a New Quebec.

The Reform Party saw the Canadian federal government as led by the Liberal and Progressive Conservative parties as being consistently indifferent to Western Canada while focusing too much attention on Eastern Canada (especially Quebec). It noted that the National Energy Program of the 1980s, introduced by a federal Liberal government, involved major government intervention into Canada's energy markets to regulate prices, resulting in economic losses to Alberta and benefits to Eastern Canada. It also cited the 1986 decision by a federal Progressive Conservative government to contract the construction of CF-18 military aircraft to an unprepared contractor in Quebec rather than a ready contractor in Winnipeg, Manitoba. To Reformers, these events served as evidence that Liberals and Progressive Conservatives consistently favoured Eastern Canada at the expense of Western Canada.

=== Role of government ===
==== Decentralization and Senate reform ====
The Reform Party called for a decentralized Canadian federation in which the provinces would have more authority and advocated that the Canadian federal government ensure provincial equality in Canada such as by creating a Triple-E Senate. The Senate of Canada would become a democratically elected chamber (then and now, the Senate continues to be an appointed body, appointments are still made by the Governor General, but now following the list offered by the Prime Minister) and each province would have an equal number of seats, so that no province would have more power than another. A Triple-E Senate was highly popular in Western Canada, especially Alberta, where the Reform Party drew large support.

==== Reductions in government-provided services ====
The Reform Party called for the privatization of various government services that the party believed could be better provided by the private sector. These government services included a number of state-owned corporations including Canada Post, the Canadian Broadcasting Corporation, and Petro Canada. The Reform Party suggested that Canada's government-funded universal health insurance system be replaced by a two-tier private and public health insurance system. Preston Manning asserted however that the Reform Party was committed to ensuring that all Canadians would be able to access health insurance and health services.

=== Economic policy ===
==== International trade policies ====
The Reform Party supported a classical liberal economic plan including support for free trade and the North American Free Trade Agreement.

==== Taxation policies ====
The Reform Party supported significant tax cuts for citizens and businesses and opposed the Goods and Services Tax (GST).

==== Government spending ====
In the 1993 federal election, Reform pledged to eliminate Canada's chronic budget deficit within a period of three years. However, the Liberals won a majority government and pledged to eliminate the deficit too, though with a more moderate approach.

=== Social policy ===
==== Aboriginal affairs ====
The Reform Party called for major changes in the federal government's relations with Aboriginal peoples, which included dismantling the Department of Indian Affairs and transferring its responsibilities directly to Aboriginal governing bodies to lessen Aboriginal peoples' dependence on the federal government.

==== Gay rights ====
The Reform Party strongly opposed extending marriage rights to gays and lesbians. Many members of the Reform Party saw homosexuality as a moral wrong. Reform leader Preston Manning himself once publicly stated that "homosexuality is destructive to the individual, and in the long run, society".

==== Immigration policy, language, and minority rights ====
The Reform Party advocated an immigration policy based solely on the economic needs of Canada and differed from the other main parties by calling for more restrictions on immigration and for an annual limit on migration into Canada. Reform's early policy proposals for immigration were seen as highly controversial in Canada including a policy pamphlet called Blue Sheet that was issued in mid-1991 stating that Reformers opposed "any immigration based on race or creed or designed to radically or suddenly alter the ethnic makeup of Canada". The statement was considered too controversial and subsequent Reform Party policy documents did not declare any similar concern for a radical alteration of the ethnic make-up of Canada. By 1993, the party began to soften its image as intolerant of minorities and ahead of the 1997 election sought to both recruit candidates and appeal to voters from ethnic minority backgrounds. In an updated version of the party's policy platform released as the Blue Book in 1996, Reform supported the acceptance and integration of immigrants and refugees that met the requirements of the UN 1951 Refugee Convention "regardless of race, language or culture" while calling for limits on family migration, barring non-citizens from claiming state unemployment welfare and stricter penalties against illegal immigration. However, the original Blue Sheet pamphlet and controversial opinions expressed by individuals within Reform raised the question over whether Reform was intolerant to non-white people and whether the party harboured racist members. Subsequent repeated accounts of xenophobic and racist statements by individual Reform party supporters and members spread this concern, though the party itself continuously denied that it supported such views.

The Reform Party declared its opposition to existing government-funded bilingualism and multiculturalism. Reformers claimed that efforts to create a bilingual country had not worked and that language policy should be a provincial issue. Reformers criticized government-sponsored multiculturalism for creating a "hyphenated Canadian" identity, rather than a single Canadian identity. The party's platform called to an end to government initiatives to promote multiculturalism in Canada.

=== National unity ===
The Reform Party differed greatly with other major federal political parties in regards to national unity, as it did not treat the Francophone province of Quebec in a unique manner. Instead, it believed Quebec was just one province of Canada, all of which were equal and none having a special status. Unlike the other parties, Reform did not believe that Quebec secession should be sought to be avoided at all costs and by all means, because the party believed that this amounted to favouritism to Quebec. Reformers believed that Canada could continue to exist without Quebec, but hoped that offers of decentralization would satisfy the desire of the Quebec government for greater autonomy while still being equitable to all the provinces.

=== Public controversies regarding Reform's policies ===
Manning denied that he and most Reformers based their policies on intolerant views, but admitted that the party's populism had an inadvertent effect of drawing in some intolerant people whom Manning claimed he had always sought to keep out. Manning claimed that he was just as committed to purging extremists from the Reform Party as his father Ernest Manning had been when he purged anti-Semites from the Alberta Social Credit Party. He stated that during the 1988 election he was faced with just such an extremist, Doug Collins, who was seeking nomination as a Reform candidate. Many Reform supporters condemned Collins as being racist and said that they would leave the party if he were nominated. Manning responded by sending a letter to the constituency association which called for all candidates to accept the Reform Party's denouncement of racism and demanded that Collins accept this. Collins and his supporters refused, and he subsequently failed to win the nomination.

In 1993, Manning was again confronted by an example of intolerance by a Reform Party candidate, John Beck, who made a series of anti-immigrant remarks in an interview with Excalibur, the York University student paper. York students confronted Manning with the remarks, and within an hour, Beck was forced to withdraw his candidacy. Reform Members of Parliament (MP) such as Deborah Grey joined Manning in denouncing such intolerant people who joined the party. Reform MPs Jan Brown and Stephen Harper (who would later become Prime Minister) went against the majority of Reform delegates at the 1994 party convention by refusing to support a motion that called for the party to oppose the allowance of homosexual couples to be treated the same as heterosexual couples. In 1996, after Reform MP Bob Ringma stated in a newspaper interview that store owners should be free to move gays and "ethnics" "to the back of the shop", or even to fire them if the presence of that individual offended a bigoted customer, and following Reform MP David Chatters' remark that it would be acceptable for a school to prevent a homosexual person from teaching in school, a crisis erupted in the Reform Party caucus after Manning did not censure their comments. MPs Jan Brown and Jim Silye demanded that Manning reprimand Ringma and Chatters, threatening that they and other moderate Reformers would leave the party if no reprimand was taken. Manning proceeded to suspend Ringma and Chatters for several months but also reprimanded Brown and Silye for speaking out against the party. Brown and Silye both subsequently left the Reform Party and later ran as Progressive Conservative candidates.

In spite of official objections to intolerance by the party leadership and some Reformer MPs, comments and decisions made at party conventions by Reform Party supporters on a number of issues were considered highly intolerant by onlookers. In 1991, Manning was humiliated at a Reform Party rally when a supporter praised him in racist terms, saying, "You're a fine white person. You know, we are letting in too many people from the Third World, the low blacks, the low Hispanics. They're going to take over the province." Later in the same rally, another supporter stood up and said, "Let them [Quebeckers] go. We don't need Quebec." Long-time Progressive Conservative member and political commentator Dalton Camp observed the 1994 Reform convention in Ottawa and was personally disgusted with what he heard, saying, "The speechifying gives off acrid whiffs of xenophobia, homophobia, and paranoia—like an exhaust—in which it seems clear both orator and audience have been seized by some private terror: immigrants, lesbians, people out of work or from out of town and criminals." During the Reform Party policy convention in 1995, Manning urged members to avoid extremism, and a motion was passed saying that the Reform Party recognized the equality of every individual, but only after the delegates demanded that the words "without discrimination" be removed from the motion. The 1995 convention controversially called for the removal of group specification in all human rights legislation which was accepted in the convention by a 93 percent vote in favour. Another controversial motion in the 1995 convention called for tighter regulation of people infected with HIV, which was supported by 84 percent of the delegates. One Reformer delegate raised concern that such a policy on HIV would make the party look anti-homosexual, but another delegate responded to this by saying "I did not join the Reform Party to bow down at the altar of political correctness."

The Reform Party was plagued by an influx of intolerant people who supported the party's opposition to government-funded multicultural programs and bilingual programs. Some have claimed that the large problem of intolerance in the Reform Party was not a mere coincidence of its policies of opposing government-sponsored multicultural programs, but a deliberate effort by the party to rally such intolerant people and to push an intolerant agenda. The media focused on Reform's troubles involving intolerant people within the party, which made the party appear to support such intolerance.

On the issue of episodes of racism and extremism within the Reform Party, Manning himself recognized the serious dangers that the political ideology of populism (which the Reform Party supported) posed should racists and extremists infiltrate it and spoke of the serious need for the party to repel such racism and extremism, saying that:

If a revival of grassroots democratic populism is to be characteristic of the revitalization of Canadian federal politics of the 1990s, especially in Quebec and the West, it is of primary importance that its leaders be well versed in ways and means of preventing populism from developing racist or other extremist overtones. (This, of course, is also the number-one challenge facing those attempting to lead the reform movements of eastern Europe and the Soviet Union.)"

By 1997, the Reform Party attempted to combat distaste for its views on immigration and minority rights by selecting multiple members of ethnic minority groups as candidates in that year's federal election. As a result, multiple minorities became Reform MPs, including Rahim Jaffer (who became Canada's first Muslim Member of Parliament), Gurmant Grewal (an Indo-Canadian Sikh who had immigrated to Canada six years earlier), Deepak Obhrai (who was born in Tanzania), and Inky Mark (a Chinese-Canadian). However, these attempts to refurbish the party's image were damaged during the 1997 campaign, when Reform released a controversial television advertisement in which the faces of four Quebec politicians (Prime Minister Jean Chrétien, Bloc Québécois leader Gilles Duceppe, Progressive Conservative leader Jean Charest, and separatist Quebec Premier Lucien Bouchard) were crossed out, followed by a message saying that Quebec politicians had dominated the federal government for too long and that Reform would end this favouritism towards Quebec. The other party leaders harshly criticized the advertisement and Manning was accused of being "intolerant" and a "bigot" for permitting the advertisement to be aired. Manning however has not held a public negative view of Quebec; in his 1992 book, The New Canada, he complimented Quebec for being open to populist third parties, mentioning the Bloc Populaire Canadien, the Ralliement créditiste du Québec, the Parti Québécois, and the Bloc Québécois as examples of populist third parties in the province.

== Related parties ==
=== Provincial wings ===
The Reform Party of Canada had two official provincial wings, that were registered by the party to be kept in a mostly dormant state.

The Reform Party of Ontario ran only one candidate in each election to maintain registration, whilst the Reform Party of Alberta ran candidates in the first two senatorial elections. There were also two unaffiliated provincial parties, the Reform Party of British Columbia and the Reform Party of Manitoba. While they had no official connection to the federal party, they shared a similar political outlook. Both provincial parties are now inactive.

The Reform Party of Canada held close association with the provincial Progressive Conservative parties in Alberta under Ralph Klein and Ontario under Mike Harris which held similar economic policies. The Reform Party also supported the populist conservative Saskatchewan Party formed in 1997 as well as the Liberal Party of British Columbia under Gordon Campbell.

=== Reform UK ===
While there is no direct link between the defunct Canadian federal party and Reform UK, a British political party which has become a serious challenger to the Conservative Party's longstanding the dominant right wing party in the United Kingdom, Reform UK leader Nigel Farage has described himself as a "great admirer" of Manning and claimed the party's current name (changed from Brexit Party in 2020) was largely inspired by Manning's former party. In September 2025 Manning was a guest speaker on the main stage at the Reform UK conference in Birmingham where he gave advice to the party on developing its strategy and organization based on his experience as leader of the Reform Party of Canada.

== Electoral performance ==
=== House of Commons ===
Election	Leader	Votes	%	Seats	+/–	Position	Status
1988	Preston Manning	275,767	2.09	0 / 295	Steady	▲4th	No seats
1993	Preston Manning	2,559,245	18.69	52 / 295	▲52	▲3rd	Third party
1997	Preston Manning	2,513,080	19.35	60 / 301	▲8	▲2nd	Opposition

== See also ==
- List of Reform Party of Canada MPs
- Reform Party candidates, 1997 Canadian federal election
- Reform Party candidates, 1993 Canadian federal election
- People's Party of Canada
