= 28th Canadian Parliament =

1968–1972 legislative term

- Majority parliament
- Sep. 12, 1968 – Sep. 1, 1972

Parliament leaders
- Prime minister: Rt. Hon. Pierre Trudeau; Apr. 20, 1968 – Jun. 4, 1979
- Cabinet: 20th Canadian Ministry
- Leader of the Opposition: Hon. Robert Stanfield; November 6, 1967 – November 21, 1976

Party caucuses
- Government: Liberal Party
- Opposition: Progressive Conservative Party
- Recognized: New Democratic Party
- Ralliement créditiste

House of Commons
- Seating arrangements of the House of Commons
- Speaker of the Commons: Hon. Lucien Lamoureux; January 18, 1966 – September 29, 1974
- Government House leader: Hon. Donald MacDonald; July 6, 1968 – September 23, 1970
- Hon. Allan MacEachen; September 24, 1970 – May 9, 1974
- Opposition House leader: Hon. Ged Baldwin; July 27, 1968 – September 20, 1973
- Members: 264 MP seats List of members

Senate
- Speaker of the Senate: Hon. Jean-Paul Deschatelets; September 5, 1968 – December 13, 1972
- Government Senate leader: Vacant; April 20, 1968 – March 31, 1969
- Hon. Paul Martin Sr. April 1, 1969 – August 7, 1974
- Opposition Senate leader: Hon. Jacques Flynn; October 31, 1967 – May 22, 1979
- Senators: 102 senator seats List of senators

Sovereign
- Monarch: Elizabeth II; 6 February 1952 – 8 September 2022
- Governor general: Roland Michener; 17 April 1967 – 14 January 1974

Sessions
- 1st session September 12, 1968 – October 22, 1969
- 2nd session October 23, 1969 – October 7, 1970
- 3rd session October 8, 1970 – February 16, 1972
- 4th session February 17, 1972 – September 1, 1972
← 27th	→ 29th

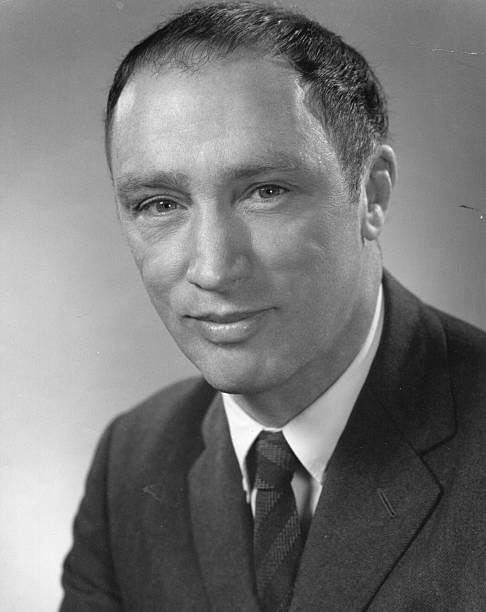
Pierre Trudeau (pictured here in 1968) was Prime Minister during the 28th Canadian Parliament.

The 28th Canadian Parliament was in session from September 12, 1968, until September 1, 1972. The membership was set by the 1968 federal election on June 25, 1968, and it changed only slightly due to resignations and by-elections until it was dissolved prior to the 1972 election.

There were four sessions of the 28th Parliament:

Session	Start	End
1st	September 12, 1968	October 22, 1969
2nd	October 23, 1969	October 7, 1970
3rd	October 8, 1970	February 16, 1972
4th	February 17, 1972	September 1, 1972

== Overview ==
It was controlled by a Liberal Party majority under Prime Minister Pierre Trudeau and the 20th Canadian Ministry. The Official Opposition was the Progressive Conservative Party led by Robert Stanfield.

== Party standings ==
Number of members per party	Party leader	General Election
Number of members per party	Party leader	Jun. 25, 1968
Liberal	Pierre Trudeau	154
Progressive Conservative	Robert Stanfield	72
NDP	Tommy Douglas	22
Ralliement créditiste	Réal Caouette	14
Liberal-Labour	Pierre Trudeau	1
Independent		1
Total Seats		264

== Major events ==
=== Criminal law reform ===
==== Bill C-150: Criminal Law Amendment Act, 1968-69 ====
The Criminal Law Amendment Act, 1968-89 was an omnibus will that made changes to the Canadian Criminal Code, the Parole Act, the Penitentiary Act, the Prisons and Reformatories Act, the Combines Investigation Act, the Customs Tariff, and the National Defense Act. The act instituted new laws around contraceptives, homosexuality, abortion, gambling, firearms, harassments over the telephone, misleading advertisements, cruelty to animals, and drunk driving.

===== Abortion and contraception =====
The act decriminalized contraception and made abortion legal in situations where a pregnancy was considered a threat to a woman's life or health. The procedure for obtaining an abortion under the act was quite strict, requiring approval from a hospital's Therapeutic Abortion Committee and no less than three doctors.

===== Decriminalization of homosexuality =====
In response to the conviction of Everett Klippert in 1967, the government began investigating changes that might be made to Canada's laws around sodomy and gross indecency which effectively criminalized homosexual acts. The Criminal Law Amendment Act, 1968-69 added an exemption to the Criminal Code that made these acts legal in circumstances where there were only two participants, both were at least 21 years old, and the actions were conducted in private.

In 1967, in his announcement of the first rendition of the bill, Trudeau, then justice minister, gave a televised interview where he uttered the now famous line "There's no place for the state in the bedrooms of the nation".

===== Gambling =====
Changes made in Bill C-150 allowed the federal and provincial governments to run lotteries and allowed the provinces to permit licensees to run certain forms of lotteries. Previously the only forms of gambling that had been legal in Canada were pari-mutuel betting on horse races and low stakes, charitable lottery schemes. These changes were instituted partially to assist in the raising of funds for the Montreal Olympics.

==== Bill C-3: Hate Propaganda ====
Recommendations from the Special Committee on Hate Propaganda in Canada, also called the Cohen Committee, resulted in the government adding provisions related to hate propaganda to the Criminal Code in 1970. These criminalized the advocation of genocide and inciting hatred in a public place against any identifiable group (here colour, race, religion, national or ethnic origin, age, sex, sexual orientation, gender identity or expression, or mental or physical disability).

=== The Fuddle Duddle Incident ===
An incident wherein Prime Minister Trudeau was accused of mouthing “Fuck off” to a Conservative MP while in Parliament.

== Ministry ==
The 20th Canadian Ministry began near the end of the 27th Canadian Parliament and lasted for all of the 28th, 29th, 30th parliaments.

== Officeholders ==
=== Head of State ===
Office	Photo	Name	Assumed office	Left office
Sovereign		Elizabeth II	February 6, 1952	September 8, 2022
Governor General		Roland Michener	April 17, 1967	January 14, 1974

=== Party leadership ===
Party	Photo	Name	Assumed office	Left office
Liberal		Pierre Trudeau	April 6, 1968	June 16, 1984
Progressive Conservative		Robert Stanfield	November 6, 1967	February 21, 1976
New Democratic		Tommy Douglas	August 3, 1961	April 24, 1971
New Democratic		David Lewis	April 24, 1971	July 7, 1975
Ralliement créditiste		Réal Caouette	September 1, 1963	October 9, 1971

=== House of Commons ===
==== Presiding officer ====
Office	Photo	Officer	Riding	Assumed office	Left office	Party
Speaker of the House of Commons		Lucien Lamoureux	Stormont—Dundas	January 18, 1966	September 29, 1974	Liberal

==== Government leadership (Liberal) ====
Office	Officer	Riding	Assumed office	Left office
Prime Minister	Pierre Trudeau	Mount Royal	April 20, 1968	June 4, 1979
Prime Minister	Pierre Trudeau	Mount Royal	March 3, 1980	June 30, 1984
House Leader	Allan MacEachen	Cape Breton Highlands—Canso	September 24, 1970	May 9, 1974
House Leader	Donald MacDonald	Ottawa West	July 6, 1968	September 23, 1970
Whip	Bernard Pilon	Chambly—Rouville	1966	November 17, 1970
Whip	Lloyd Francis	Ottawa West	December 17, 1970	September 30, 1971
Whip	Grant Deachman	Vancouver Quadra	October, 1971	September 1972

== Changes to party standings ==
Number of members per party	General Election	B/E	B/E	F/C	B/E	F/C	B/E	F/C	B/E	F/C	B/E	F/C
Number of members per party	Jun. 25, 1968	Feb. 10, 1969	Apr. 8, 1969	Dec. 3, 1969	Apr. 13, 1970	Sep., 1970	Nov. 6, 1970	May. 21, 1971	May. 31, 1971	Jul. 25, 1971	Nov. 8, 1971	Mar. 13, 1972
Liberal	154		▼1	▼1			▲1	▼1	▼1		▼1	▼1
Progressive Conservative	72					▲1				▲1		▲1
NDP	22		▲1						▲1		▲1	
Ralliement créditiste	14						▼1					
Liberal-Labour	1											
Independent	1			▲1		▼1		▲1		▼1		
Total Seats	264											

=== By-elections ===
By-election	Date	Incumbent	Party	Winner	Party	Cause	Retained
Assiniboia	November 8, 1971	Albert B. Douglas	Liberal	Bill Knight	New Democratic	Death	No
Central Nova	May 31, 1971	Russell MacEwan	Progressive Conservative	Elmer M. MacKay	Progressive Conservative	Resignation	Yes
Brant	May 31, 1971	James Elisha Brown	Liberal	Derek Blackburn	New Democratic	Appointed a judge	No
Chambly	May 31, 1971	Bernard Pilon	Liberal	Yvon L'Heureux	Liberal	Death	Yes
Trois-Rivières	May 31, 1971	Joseph-Alfred Mongrain	Liberal	Claude Lajoie	Liberal	Death	Yes
Lisgar	November 6, 1970	George Muir	Progressive Conservative	Jack Murta	Progressive Conservative	Death	Yes
Frontenac	November 6, 1970	Bernard Dumont	Ralliement Créditiste	Léopold Corriveau	Liberal	Resignation	No
Labelle	November 6, 1970	Léo Cadieux	Liberal	Maurice Dupras	Liberal	Appointed Ambassador to France	Yes
Selkirk	April 13, 1970	Edward Schreyer	New Democratic	Doug Rowland	New Democratic	Resignation	Yes
Comox—Alberni	April 8, 1969	Richard J. J. Durante	Liberal	Thomas Speakman Barnett	New Democratic	Election declared void	No
Nanaimo—Cowichan—The Islands	February 10, 1969	Colin Cameron	New Democratic	Tommy C. Douglas	New Democratic	Death	Yes

== Parliamentarians ==
=== House of Commons ===
Members of the House of Commons in the 28th parliament arranged by province.

Key:

- Party leaders are italicized.
- Parliamentary secretaries is indicated by "‡".
- Cabinet ministers are in **boldface**.
- The Prime Minister is **both**.
- The Speaker is indicated by "(†)".

==== Alberta ====
Riding	Member	Political party	First elected / previously elected	No. of terms
Athabasca	Paul Yewchuk	Progressive Conservative	1968	1st term
Battle River	Cliff Downey	Progressive Conservative	1968	1st term
Calgary Centre	Douglas Harkness	Progressive Conservative	1945	9th term
Calgary North	Eldon Woolliams	Progressive Conservative	1958	5th term
Calgary South	**Patrick Mahoney** ‡	Liberal	1968	1st term
Crowfoot	Jack Horner	Progressive Conservative	1958	5th term
Edmonton Centre	Steve Paproski	Progressive Conservative	1968	1st term
Edmonton East	William Skoreyko	Progressive Conservative	1958	5th term
Edmonton West	Marcel Lambert	Progressive Conservative	1957	6th term
Edmonton—Strathcona	Hu Harries	Liberal	1968	1st term
Lethbridge	Deane Gundlock	Progressive Conservative	1958	5th term
Medicine Hat	**Bud Olson**	Liberal	1957, (Note: First elected as a Social Credit) 1962 (Note: Re-elected as a Social Credit)	5th term*
Palliser	Stanley Schumacher	Progressive Conservative	1968	1st term
Peace River	Ged Baldwin	Progressive Conservative	1958	5th term
Pembina	Jack Bigg	Progressive Conservative	1958	5th term
Red Deer	Robert N. Thompson	Progressive Conservative	1962	4th term
Rocky Mountain	Allen Sulatycky ‡	Liberal	1968	1st term
Vegreville	Don Mazankowski	Progressive Conservative	1968	1st term
Wetaskiwin	Harry Andrew Moore	Progressive Conservative	1962	4th term

==== British Columbia ====
Riding	Member	Political party	First elected / previously elected	No. of terms
Burnaby—Richmond	Tom Goode	Liberal	1968	1st term
Burnaby—Seymour	Ray Perrault ‡	Liberal	1968	1st term
Capilano	**Jack Davis**	Liberal	1962	4th term
Coast Chilcotin	Paul St. Pierre ‡	Liberal	1968	1st term
Comox—Alberni	Richard Durante	Liberal	1968	1st term
Comox—Alberni	Thomas Speakman Barnett (1969)*	New Democrat	1953, 1962, 1969	6th term*
Esquimalt—Saanich	David Anderson	Liberal	1968	1st term
Fraser Valley East	Ervin Pringle	Liberal	1968	1st term
Fraser Valley West	Mark Rose	New Democrat	1968	1st term
Kamloops—Cariboo	Leonard Marchand	Liberal	1968	1st term
Kootenay West	Randolph Harding	New Democrat	1968	1st term
Nanaimo—Cowichan—The Islands	Colin Cameron	New Democrat	1953, 1962	6th term*
Nanaimo—Cowichan—The Islands	Tommy Douglas (1969)**	New Democrat	1935, (Note: Weyburn (Saskatchewan)) 1962, (Note: Burnaby—Coquitlam) 1969	6th term*
New Westminster	Douglas Hogarth ‡	Liberal	1968	1st term
Okanagan Boundary	Bruce Howard ‡	Liberal	1968	1st term
Okanagan—Kootenay	William Douglas Stewart	Liberal	1968	1st term
Prince George—Peace River	Robert Borrie	Liberal	1968	1st term
Skeena	Frank Howard	New Democrat	1957	6th term
Surrey	Barry Mather	New Democrat	1962	4th term
Vancouver Centre	**Ron Basford**	Liberal	1963	3rd term
Vancouver East	Harold Winch	New Democrat	1953	7th term
Vancouver Kingsway	Grace MacInnis	New Democrat	1965	2nd term
Vancouver Quadra	Grant Deachman	Liberal	1963	3rd term
Vancouver South	**Arthur Laing**	Liberal	1949, 1962	5th term*
Victoria	David Groos ‡	Liberal	1963	3rd term

* Richard Durante won in 1968 by only nine votes over Tom Barnett. After several irregularities were found the result was declared void and Tom Barnett won the subsequent redo held on March 8, 1969.
** Colin Cameron died in office and was replaced by Tommy Douglas in a February 10, 1969 by-election

==== Manitoba ====
Riding	Member	Political party	First elected / previously elected	No. of terms
Brandon—Souris	Walter Dinsdale	Progressive Conservative	1951	8th term
Churchill	Robert Simpson	Progressive Conservative	1957	6th term
Dauphin	Gordon Ritchie	Progressive Conservative	1968	1st term
Lisgar	George Muir	Progressive Conservative	1957	6th term
Lisgar	Jack Murta (1970)*	Progressive Conservative	1970	1st term
Marquette	Craig Stewart	Progressive Conservative	1968	1st term
Portage	Gerald Cobbe ‡	Liberal	1968	1st term
Provencher	Mark Smerchanski	Liberal	1968	1st term
Selkirk	Edward Schreyer	New Democrat	1965	2nd term
Selkirk	Doug Rowland (1970)**	New Democrat	1970	1st term
St. Boniface	Joseph-Philippe Guay	Liberal	1968	1st term
Winnipeg North	David Orlikow	New Democrat	1962	4th term
Winnipeg North Centre	Stanley Knowles	New Democrat	1942, 1962	9th term*
Winnipeg South	**James Richardson**	Liberal	1968	1st term
Winnipeg South Centre	Edmund Boyd Osler	Liberal	1968	1st term

* George Muir died in office on August 26, 1970, and was replaced by Jack Murta in a by-election later that year.
** Edward Schreyer left parliament to become leader of the Manitoba NDP and then Premier of Manitoba he was replaced by Doug Rowland in a 1969 by-election.

==== New Brunswick ====
Riding	Member	Political party	First elected / previously elected	No. of terms
Carleton—Charlotte	Hugh Flemming	Progressive Conservative	1960	5th term
Fundy—Royal	Robert Fairweather	Progressive Conservative	1962	4th term
Gloucester	Herb Breau	Liberal	1968	1st term
Madawaska—Victoria	Eymard Corbin ‡	Liberal	1968	1st term
Moncton	Charlie Thomas	Progressive Conservative	1968	1st term
Northumberland—Miramichi	Percy Smith	Liberal	1968	1st term
Restigouche	**Jean-Eudes Dubé**	Liberal	1962	4th term
Saint John—Lancaster	Thomas Miller Bell	Progressive Conservative	1953	7th term
Westmorland—Kent	Guy Crossman	Liberal	1962	4th term
York—Sunbury	John Chester MacRae	Progressive Conservative	1957	6th term

==== Newfoundland ====
Riding	Member	Political party	First elected / previously elected	No. of terms
Bonavista—Trinity—Conception	Frank Moores*	Progressive Conservative	1968	1st term
Burin—Burgeo	**Donald Jamieson**	Liberal	1966	2nd term
Gander—Twillingate	John Lundrigan	Progressive Conservative	1968	1st term
Grand Falls—White Bay—Labrador	Ambrose Peddle	Progressive Conservative	1968	1st term
Humber—St. George's—St. Barbe	Jack Marshall	Progressive Conservative	1968	1st term
St. John's East	James McGrath	Progressive Conservative	1957, 1968	4th term*
St. John's West	Walter Carter	Progressive Conservative	1968	1st term

* Frank Moores resigned to enter provincial politics in 1971 and the seat remains vacant

==== Nova Scotia ====
Riding	Member	Political party	First elected / previously elected	No. of terms
Annapolis Valley	Pat Nowlan	Progressive Conservative	1965	2nd term
Cape Breton Highlands—Canso	**Allan MacEachen**	Liberal	1953, 1962	6th term*
Cape Breton—East Richmond	Donald MacInnis	Progressive Conservative	1957, 1963	5th term*
Cape Breton—The Sydneys	Robert Muir	Progressive Conservative	1957	6th term
Central Nova	Russell MacEwan	Progressive Conservative	1957	6th term
Central Nova	Elmer MacKay (1971)*	Progressive Conservative	1971	1st term
Cumberland—Colchester North	Robert Coates	Progressive Conservative	1957	6th term
Dartmouth—Halifax East	Michael Forrestall	Progressive Conservative	1965	2nd term
Halifax	Robert Stanfield	Progressive Conservative	1967	2nd term
Halifax—East Hants	Robert McCleave	Progressive Conservative	1957, 1965	5th term*
South Shore	Lloyd Crouse	Progressive Conservative	1957	6th term
South Western Nova	Louis-Roland Comeau	Progressive Conservative	1968	1st term

* Russell MacEwan resigned and was replaced by Elmer MacKay in a May 31, 1971 by-election.

==== Ontario ====
Riding	Member	Political party	First elected / previously elected	No. of terms
Algoma	Maurice Foster	Liberal	1968	1st term
Brant	James Elisha Brown	Liberal	1953, 1962	5th term*
Brant	Derek Blackburn (1971)*	New Democrat	1971	1st term
Broadview	John Gilbert	New Democrat	1965	2nd term
Bruce	Ross Whicher	Liberal	1968	1st term
Cochrane	Ralph Stewart	Liberal	1968	1st term
Davenport	Charles Caccia ‡	Liberal	1968	1st term
Don Valley	Bob Kaplan	Liberal	1968	1st term
Eglinton	**Mitchell Sharp**	Liberal	1963	3rd term
Elgin	Harold Stafford	Liberal	1965	2nd term
Essex	Eugene Whelan ‡	Liberal	1962	4th term
Etobicoke	**Alastair Gillespie** ‡	Liberal	1968	1st term
Fort William	Hubert Badanai	Liberal	1958	5th term
Frontenac—Lennox and Addington	Douglas Alkenbrack	Progressive Conservative	1962	4th term
Glengarry—Prescott	Viateur Éthier	Liberal	1962	4th term
Greenwood	Andrew Brewin	New Democrat	1962	4th term
Grenville—Carleton	Gordon Blair	Liberal	1968	1st term
Grey—Simcoe	Percy Noble	Progressive Conservative	1957	6th term
Halton	Rud L. Whiting	Liberal	1968	1st term
Halton—Wentworth	John B. Morison	Liberal	1963	3rd term
Hamilton East	**John Munro**	Liberal	1962	4th term
Hamilton Mountain	Gordon J. Sullivan	Liberal	1968	1st term
Hamilton—Wentworth	Colin Gibson	Liberal	1968	1st term
Hamilton West	Lincoln Alexander	Progressive Conservative	1968	1st term
Hastings	Lee Grills	Progressive Conservative	1957, 1965	5th term*
High Park	Walter Deakon	Liberal	1968	1st term
Huron	Robert McKinley	Progressive Conservative	1965	2nd term
Kenora—Rainy River	John Mercer Reid	Liberal-Labour	1965	2nd term
Kent—Essex	Harold Danforth	Progressive Conservative	1958, 1963	4th term*
Kingston and the Islands	**Edgar Benson**	Liberal	1962	4th term
Kitchener	Kieth Hymmen	Liberal	1965	2nd term
Lakeshore	Ken Robinson	Liberal	1968	1st term
Lambton—Kent	Mac McCutcheon	Progressive Conservative	1963	3rd term
Lanark and Renfrew	Murray McBride	Liberal	1968	1st term
Leeds	Desmond Code	Progressive Conservative	1965	2nd term
Lincoln	H. Gordon Barrett	Liberal	1968	1st term
London East	Charles Turner	Liberal	1968	1st term
London West	Judd Buchanan ‡	Liberal	1968	1st term
Middlesex	Jim Lind	Liberal	1965	2nd term
Niagara Falls	**Joe Greene**	Liberal	1963	3rd term
Nickel Belt	Gaetan Serré	Liberal	1968	1st term
Nipissing	Carl Legault	Liberal	1964	3rd term
Norfolk—Haldimand	William David Knowles	Progressive Conservative	1968	1st term
Northumberland—Durham	Russell Honey ‡	Liberal	1962	4th term
Ontario	Norman Cafik	Liberal	1968	1st term
Oshawa—Whitby	Ed Broadbent	New Democrat	1968	1st term
Ottawa—Carleton	**John Turner**	Liberal	1962	4th term
Ottawa Centre	**George McIlraith**	Liberal	1940	10th term
Ottawa East	Jean-Thomas Richard	Liberal	1945	9th term
Ottawa West	Cyril Lloyd Francis ‡	Liberal	1963, (Note: Carleton) 1968	2nd term*
Oxford	Wally Nesbitt	Progressive Conservative	1953	7th term
Parkdale	Stanley Haidasz ‡	Liberal	1957, (Note: Trinity) 1962	5th term*
Parry Sound-Muskoka	Gordon Aiken	Progressive Conservative	1957	6th term
Peel—Dufferin—Simcoe	Bruce Beer	Liberal	1962	4th term
Peel South	Hyliard Chappell	Liberal	1968	1st term
Perth	J. Waldo Monteith	Progressive Conservative	1953	7th term
Peterborough	Hugh Faulkner ‡	Liberal	1965	2nd term
Port Arthur	**Bob Andras**	Liberal	1965	2nd term
Prince Edward—Hastings	George Hees	Progressive Conservative	1950, (Note: Broadview) 1965	7th term*
Renfrew North	Len Hopkins	Liberal	1965	2nd term
Rosedale	**Donald Stovel Macdonald**	Liberal	1962	4th term
Sarnia	Bud Cullen ‡	Liberal	1968	1st term
Sault Ste. Marie	Terrence Murphy	Liberal	1968	1st term
Scarborough East	**Martin O'Connell** ‡	Liberal	1968	1st term
Scarborough West	David Weatherhead ‡	Liberal	1968	1st term
Simcoe North	Philip Rynard	Progressive Conservative	1957	6th term
Spadina	Sylvester Perry Ryan**	Liberal	1962	4th term
Spadina	Sylvester Perry Ryan**	Independent	1962	4th term
Spadina	Sylvester Perry Ryan**	Progressive Conservative	1962	4th term
St. Catharines	James McNulty	Liberal	1962	4th term
St. Paul's	Ian Wahn	Liberal	1962	4th term
Stormont—Dundas	Lucien Lamoureux (†)	Independent	1962 (Note: First elected as a Liberal)	4th term
Sudbury	James Jerome ‡	Liberal	1968	1st term
Thunder Bay	Keith Penner	Liberal	1968	1st term
Timiskaming	Arnold Peters	New Democrat	1957	6th term
Timmins	Jean Roy	Liberal	1968	1st term
Trinity	**Paul Hellyer*****	Liberal	1949, (Note: Davenport) 1958	7th term*
Trinity	**Paul Hellyer*****	Independent Liberal	1949, 1958	7th term*
Trinity	**Paul Hellyer*****	Progressive Conservative	1949, 1958	7th term*
Victoria—Haliburton	William C. Scott	Progressive Conservative	1965	2nd term
Waterloo	Max Saltsman	New Democrat	1964	3rd term
Welland	Donald Tolmie ‡	Liberal	1965	2nd term
Wellington	Alfred Hales	Progressive Conservative	1957	6th term
Wellington—Grey	Marvin Howe	Progressive Conservative	1953	7th term
Windsor West	**Herb Gray** ‡	Liberal	1962	4th term
Windsor—Walkerville	Mark MacGuigan	Liberal	1968	1st term
York Centre	James E. Walker ‡	Liberal	1962	4th term
York East	Steven Otto ‡	Liberal	1962	4th term
York North	Barney Danson ‡	Liberal	1968	1st term
York—Scarborough	**Robert Stanbury** ‡	Liberal	1965	2nd term
York—Simcoe	John Roberts ‡	Liberal	1968	1st term
York South	David Lewis	New Democrat	1962, 1965	3rd term*
York West	Philip Givens****	Liberal	1968	1st term

* James Elisha Brown was appointed ambassador and was replaced by Derek Blackburn in a 1971 by-election
** On December 3, 1969, Sylvester Perry Ryan left the Liberal Party to sit as an independent, uncomfortable with Trudeau's policies. On September 11, 1970, he joined the Progressive Conservatives.
*** On May 21, 1971, Paul Hellyer left the Liberal Party to sit as an independent, protesting the government's economic policies. On July 25, 1972, he joined the Progressive Conservatives.
**** Philip Givens resigned to enter provincial politics in 1971 and the seat remains vacant

==== Prince Edward Island ====
Riding	Member	Political party	First elected / previously elected	No. of terms
Cardigan	Melvin McQuaid	Progressive Conservative	1965	2nd term
Egmont	David MacDonald	Progressive Conservative	1965	2nd term
Hillsborough	Heath MacQuarrie	Progressive Conservative	1957	6th term
Malpeque	Angus MacLean	Progressive Conservative	1951	8th term

==== Quebec ====
Riding	Member	Political party	First elected / previously elected	No. of terms
Abitibi	Gérard Laprise	Ralliement Créditiste	1962	4th term
Abitibi	Gérard Laprise	Social Credit*	1962	4th term
Ahuntsic	Jean-Léo Rochon	Liberal	1962	4th term
Argenteuil	Robert Major	Liberal	1968	1st term
Beauce	Romuald Rodrigue	Ralliement Créditiste	1968	1st term
Beauce	Romuald Rodrigue	Social Credit*	1968	1st term
Beauharnois	Gérald Laniel	Liberal	1962	4th term
Bellechasse	Joseph Lambert	Ralliement Créditiste	1968	1st term
Bellechasse	Joseph Lambert	Social Credit*	1968	1st term
Berthier	Antonio Yanakis	Liberal	1965	2nd term
Bonaventure	Albert Béchard ‡	Liberal	1962	4th term
Bourassa	Jacques Trudel	Liberal	1968	1st term
Chambly	Bernard Pilon	Liberal	1962	4th term
Chambly	Yvon L'Heureux (1971)**	Liberal	1957, 1971	2nd term*
Champlain	René Matte	Ralliement Créditiste	1968	1st term
Champlain	René Matte	Social Credit*	1968	1st term
Charlevoix	Martial Asselin	Progressive Conservative	1958, 1965	3rd term*
Chicoutimi	Paul Langlois ‡	Liberal	1965	2nd term
Compton	Henry Latulippe	Ralliement Créditiste	1962	4th term
Compton	Henry Latulippe	Social Credit*	1962	4th term
Dollard	**Jean-Pierre Goyer** ‡	Liberal	1965	2nd term
Drummond	**Jean-Luc Pépin**	Liberal	1963	3rd term
Duvernay	**Eric Kierans**	Liberal	1968	1st term
Frontenac	Bernard Dumont	Ralliement Créditiste	1962, (Note: Bellechasse) 1968	2nd term*
Frontenac	Léopold Corriveau (1970)***	Liberal	1970	1st term
Gamelin	Arthur Portelance	Liberal	1968	1st term
Gaspé	Alexandre Cyr	Liberal	1963, 1968	2nd term*
Gatineau	Gaston Clermont ‡	Liberal	1960, (Note: Labelle) 1965	4th term*
Hochelaga	**Gérard Pelletier**	Liberal	1965	2nd term
Hull	Gaston Isabelle ‡	Liberal	1965	2nd term
Joliette	Roch La Salle****	Progressive Conservative	1968	1st term
Joliette	Roch La Salle****	Independent	1968	1st term
Kamouraska	Charles-Eugène Dionne	Ralliement Créditiste	1962	4th term
Kamouraska	Charles-Eugène Dionne	Social Credit*	1962	4th term
Labelle	**Léo Cadieux**	Liberal	1962	4th term
Labelle	Maurice Dupras (1970)†	Liberal	1970	1st term
Lapointe	Gilles Marceau	Liberal	1968	1st term
La Prairie	Ian Watson ‡	Liberal	1963	3rd term
Lac-Saint-Jean	Marcel Lessard ‡	Liberal	1962, 1968	3rd term*
Lachine	Raymond Rock††	Liberal	1962	4th term
Lachine	Raymond Rock††	Progressive Conservative	1962	4th term
Lafontaine	Georges-C. Lachance	Liberal	1962	4th term
Langelier	**Jean Marchand**	Liberal	1965	2nd term
Lasalle	H.-Pit Lessard	Liberal	1958	5th term
Laurier	Fernand Leblanc	Liberal	1964	3rd term
Laval	Marcel-Claude Roy	Liberal	1968	1st term
Lévis	Raynald Guay	Liberal	1963	3rd term
Longueuil	**Jean-Pierre Côté**	Liberal	1963	3rd term
Lotbiniere	André-Gilles Fortin	Ralliement Créditiste	1968	1st term
Lotbiniere	André-Gilles Fortin	Social Credit*	1968	1st term
Louis-Hébert	Jean-Charles Cantin ‡	Liberal	1962	4th term
Maisonneuve	J. Antonio Thomas	Liberal	1965	2nd term
Manicouagan	Gustave Blouin ‡	Liberal	1963	3rd term
Matane	Pierre de Bané	Liberal	1968	1st term
Mercier	Prosper Boulanger	Liberal	1962	4th term
Missisquoi	Yves Forest ‡	Liberal	1963	3rd term
Montmorency	Ovide Laflamme	Liberal	1955, (Note: Bellechasse) 1965	4th term*
Mount Royal	**Pierre Trudeau**	Liberal	1965	2nd term
Notre-Dame-de-Grâce	Warren Allmand	Liberal	1965	2nd term
Outremont	Aurélien Noël	Liberal	1967	2nd term
Papineau	André Ouellet ‡	Liberal	1967	2nd term
Pontiac	Thomas Lefebvre	Liberal	1965	2nd term
Portneuf	Roland Godin	Ralliement Créditiste	1965	2nd term
Portneuf	Roland Godin	Social Credit*	1965	2nd term
Quebec East	Gérard Duquet ‡	Liberal	1965	2nd term
Richelieu	Florian Côté ‡	Liberal	1966	2nd term
Richmond	Léonel Beaudoin	Ralliement Créditiste	1968	1st term
Richmond	Léonel Beaudoin	Social Credit*	1968	1st term
Rimouski	Louis Guy LeBlanc	Liberal	1965	2nd term
Roberval	Charles-Arthur Gauthier	Ralliement Créditiste	1962	4th term
Roberval	Charles-Arthur Gauthier	Social Credit*	1962	4th term
Saint-Denis	Marcel Prud'homme ‡	Liberal	1964	3rd term
Saint-Henri	Gérard Loiselle ‡	Liberal	1957	6th term
Saint-Hyacinthe	Théogène Ricard	Progressive Conservative	1957	6th term
Saint-Jacques	Jacques Guilbault	Liberal	1968	1st term
Saint-Jean	Walter Smith	Liberal	1968	1st term
Saint-Maurice	**Jean Chrétien**	Liberal	1963	3rd term
Saint-Michel	Victor Forget	Liberal	1968	1st term
Sainte-Marie	Georges Valade	Progressive Conservative	1958	5th term
Shefford	Gilbert Rondeau	Ralliement Créditiste	1962, 1968	3rd term*
Shefford	Gilbert Rondeau	Social Credit*	1962, 1968	3rd term*
Sherbrooke	Paul Mullins Gervais	Liberal	1968	1st term
Témiscamingue	Réal Caouette	Ralliement Créditiste	1946, (Note: Pontiac) 1962	5th term*
Témiscamingue	Réal Caouette	Social Credit*	1946, 1962	5th term*
Témiscouata	Rosaire Gendron ‡	Liberal	1963	3rd term
Terrebonne	Joseph-Roland Comtois ‡	Liberal	1965	2nd term
Trois-Rivières	Joseph-Alfred Mongrain	Liberal	1965 (Note: First elected as an Independent)	2nd term
Trois-Rivières	Claude Lajoie (1971)†††	Liberal	1971	1st term
Vaudreuil	René Émard	Liberal	1963	3rd term
Verdun	**Bryce Mackasey**	Liberal	1962	4th term
Villeneuve	Oza Tétrault	Ralliement Créditiste	1968	1st term
Villeneuve	Oza Tétrault	Social Credit*	1968	1st term
Westmount	**Charles (Bud) Drury**	Liberal	1962	4th term

* On October 9, 1971 all members of the Ralliement Créditiste rejoined to the Social Credit.
** Bernard Pilon died in office on November 17, 1970. He was replaced by Yvon L'Heureux in a 1971 by-election
*** Bernard Dumont resigned from parliament and was replaced by Léopold Corriveau in a 1970 by-election
**** Roch La Salle quit the Tory party on May 5, 1971, when leader Robert Stanfield rejected a proposal to recognize Canada as being made up of two nations
† Léo Cadieux left parliament to become ambassador to France and was replaced by Maurice Dupras in a 1970 by-election
†† Raymond Rock crossed the floor on March 12, 1972, over protests that the government gave backbenchers too little influence
††† Joseph-Alfred Mongrain died in office on December 23, 1970, and was replaced by Claude Lajoie in a 1971 by-election

==== Saskatchewan ====
Riding	Member	Political party	First elected / previously elected	No. of terms
Assiniboia	A.B. Douglas	Liberal	1968	1st term
Assiniboia	Bill Knight (1971)*	New Democrat	1971	1st term
Battleford—Kindersley	Rod Thomson	New Democrat	1968	1st term
Mackenzie	Stanley Korchinski	Progressive Conservative	1958	5th term
Meadow Lake	Bert Cadieu	Progressive Conservative	1958	5th term
Moose Jaw	John Skoberg	New Democrat	1968	1st term
Prince Albert	John Diefenbaker	Progressive Conservative	1940	10th term
Qu'Appelle—Moose Mountain	Richard Southam	Progressive Conservative	1958	5th term
Regina East	John Burton	New Democrat	1968	1st term
Regina—Lake Centre	Les Benjamin	New Democrat	1968	1st term
Saskatoon—Biggar	Alfred Gleave	New Democrat	1968	1st term
Saskatoon—Humboldt	**Otto Lang**	Liberal	1968	1st term
Swift Current—Maple Creek	Jack McIntosh	Progressive Conservative	1958	5th term
Yorkton—Melville	Lorne Nystrom	New Democrat	1968	1st term

* A.B. Douglas died in office and was replaced by Bill Knight in a 1971 by-election

==== Territories ====
Riding	Member	Political party	First elected / previously elected	No. of terms
Northwest Territories	Robert Orange ‡	Liberal	1965	2nd term
Yukon	Erik Nielsen	Progressive Conservative	1957	6th term

== Legislation and motions ==
=== Act's which received royal assent under 28th Parliament ===
==== 1st Session ====
===== Public acts =====
Date of Assent	Index	Title	Bill Number
October 3, 1968	1	Appropriation Act No. 3, 1968	C-108
October 3, 1968	2	Publication of Statutes Act, An Act to amend the	S-2
October 22, 1968	3	Canadian National Railway Branch Line from Windfall to the Sangudo Subdivision and connecting spur to South Kaybob property of Hudson's Bay Oil & Gas Company	C-109
October 31, 1968	4	Judges Act, An Act to amend the	C-114
October 31, 1968	5	Post Office Act, An Act to amend the	C-116
November 14, 1968	6	Farm Credit Act, An Act to amend the	C-110
November 14, 1968	7	Farm Improvement Loans Act, An Act to amend the	C-111
November 14, 1968	8	Prairie Grain Advance Payments Act, An Act to amend the	C-113
November 29, 1968	9	Canadian National Railways Financing and Guarantee Act, 1968	C-124
December 19, 1968	10	Anti-dumping Act	C-146
December 19, 1968	11	Appropriation Act No. 4, 1968	C-141
December 19, 1968	12	Customs Tariff, An Act to amend the	C-131
February 13, 1969	13	Aeronautics Act, An Act to amend the	S-14
February 13, 1969	14	Canada Evidence Act, An Act to amend the	S-3
February 13, 1969	15	Navigable Waters Protection Act, An Act to amend the	S-19
February 13, 1969	16	Prairie Grain Advance Payments Act, An Act to amend the	C-162
February 13, 1969	17	Precious Metals Marking Act	S-4
February 27, 1969	18	Customs Act, An Act to amend the	S-10
February 27, 1969	19	Export and Import Permits Act, An Act to amend the	S-25
February 27, 1969	20	Fisheries Improvement Loans Act, An Act to amend the	C-151
February 27, 1969	21	Freshwater Fish Marketing Act	C-148
February 27, 1969	22	Veterans' Land Act, An Act to amend the	C-152
March 11, 1969	23	Appropriation Act No. 1, 1969 (Supplementary)	C-177
March 28, 1969	24	Animal Contagious Diseases Act, An Act to amend the	C-156
March 28, 1969	25	Appropriation Act No. 2, 1969	C-185
March 28, 1969	26	Bretton Woods Agreements Act and the Currency, Mint and Exchange Fund Act, An Act to amend the	C-138
March 28, 1969	27	Financial Administration Act, An Act to amend the	C-172
March 28, 1969	28	Government Organization Act, 1969	C-173
March 28, 1969	29	Statute Law (Superannuation) Amendment Act, 1969	C-178
May 8, 1969	30	Canadian Overseas Telecommunication Corporation Act, An Act to amend the	S-5
May 8, 1969	31	Co-operative Credit Associations Act, An Act to amend the	S-28
May 8, 1969	32	Farm Machinery Syndicates Credit Act, An Act to amend the	C-112
May 8, 1969	33	Income Tax Act and the Estate Tax Act, An Act to amend the	C-165
May 8, 1969	34	Pesticide Residue Compensation Act	C-155
May 8, 1969	35	Plant Quarantine Act	C-154
June 27, 1969	36	Appropriation Act No. 3, 1969 (Main Supply)	C-210
June 27, 1969	37	Criminal Code, An Act to amend the (off-track betting)	C-197
June 27, 1969	38	Criminal Law Amendment Act, 1968–69	C-150
June 27, 1969	39	Export Development Act	C-183
June 27, 1969	40	Fisheries Improvement Loans Act, An Act to amend the	C-195
June 27, 1969	41	Food and Drugs Act, Narcotic Control Act and Criminal Code, An Act to amend the	S-15
June 27, 1969	42	Hazardous Products Act	S-26
June 27, 1969	43	Historic Sites and Monuments Act, An Act to amend the	C-153
June 27, 1969	44	Income Tax Act, An Act to amend the	C-191
June 27, 1969	45	National Housing Act, 1954, An Act to amend the	C-192
June 27, 1969	46	National Housing Act, 1954, An Act to amend the	C-201
June 27, 1969	47	National Library Act	C-171
June 27, 1969	48	Oil and Gas Production and Conservation Act	S-29
June 27, 1969	49	Patent Act, Trades Mark Act and Food and Drugs Act, An Act to amend the	C-102
June 27, 1969	50	Pest Control Products Act	C-157
June 27, 1969	51	Telesat Canada Act	C-184
July 9, 1969	52	Atlantic Region Freight Assistance Act	C-207
July 9, 1969	53	Canada Shipping Act, An Act to amend the	S-23
July 9, 1969	54	Official Languages Act	C-120
July 9, 1969	55	Patent Act, An Act to amend the	C-194
July 9, 1969	56	Regional Development Incentives Act	C-202

===== Local and private acts =====
Date of Assent	Index	Title	Bill Number
Various November 29, 1968 - July 9, 1969	57	Quebec Savings Bank, An Act respecting The	S-27
Various November 29, 1968 - July 9, 1969	58	Atlantic Mutual Life Assurance Company, An Act to incorporate	S-33
Various November 29, 1968 - July 9, 1969	59	Canadian Order of Foresters, An Act respecting	S-18
Various November 29, 1968 - July 9, 1969	60	Perth Mutual Fire Insurance Company, An Act respecting The	S-30
Various November 29, 1968 - July 9, 1969	61	Transcoastal Life Assurance Company, An Act to incorporate	S-16
Various November 29, 1968 - July 9, 1969	62	Canadian Pacific Railway Company, An Act respecting	S-31
Various November 29, 1968 - July 9, 1969	63	Canada Trust Company, An Act respecting The	S-6
Various November 29, 1968 - July 9, 1969	64	Gillespie Mortgage Corporation, An Act respecting	S-22
Various November 29, 1968 - July 9, 1969	65	Huron and Erie Mortgage Corporation, An Act respecting The	S-7
Various November 29, 1968 - July 9, 1969	66	Nova Scotia Savings and Loan Company, An Act respecting	S-34
Various November 29, 1968 - July 9, 1969	67	Atlantic Peat Moss Co. Ltd.–Mousse de Tourbe Atlantic Cie Ltée, An Act respecting	C-103
Various November 29, 1968 - July 9, 1969	68	Boy Scouts of Canada, An Act respecting and to incorporate L'Association des Scouts du Canada	S-39
Various November 29, 1968 - July 9, 1969	69	Canada North-west Land Company (Limited), An Act respecting The	S-32

==== 2nd Session ====
===== Public acts =====
Date of Assent	Index	Title	Bill Number
November 27, 1969	1	Expo Winding-up Act	C-6
December 19, 1969	2	Appropriation Act No. 4, 1969	C-169
December 19, 1969	3	Canadian National Railways Financing and Guarantee Act, 1969	C-7
December 19, 1969	4	Children of War Dead (Education Assistance) Act, An Act to amend the	C-8
December 19, 1969	5	Company of Young Canadians Act, An Act to amend the	C-171
December 19, 1969	6	Customs Tariff and to make a consequential amendment to the Excise Tax Act, An Act to amend the	C-140
December 19, 1969	7	Excise Tax Act, An Act to amend the	C-155
December 19, 1969	8	Income Tax Act, An Act to amend the	C-139
December 19, 1969	9	Judges Act, An Act to amend the	C-2
December 19, 1969	10	Prairie Grain Provisional Payments Act, 1969–70	C-157
December 19, 1969	11	Schedule A of the Bank Act, An Act to amend	S-13
March 12, 1970	12	Canada Student Loans Act, An Act to amend the	C-135
March 12, 1970	13	Canada–Sweden Supplementary Income Tax Agreement Act, 1969	C-156
March 12, 1970	14	Canadian and British Insurance Companies Act and other statutory provisions related to the subject matter of certain of those amendments, An Act to amend the	S-6
March 12, 1970	15	Company of Young Canadians Act, An Act to amend the	C-176
March 12, 1970	16	Foreign Insurance Companies Act, An Act to amend the	S-7
March 12, 1970	17	Loan Companies Act, An Act to amend the	S-9
March 12, 1970	18	Quarantine Act	S-12
March 12, 1970	19	Quebec Savings Banks Act, An Act to amend the	S-2
March 12, 1970	20	Railway Act, An Act to amend the	C-11
March 12, 1970	21	Small Businesses Loans Act, An Act to amend the	C-9
March 12, 1970	22	Trust Companies Act, An Act to amend the	S-8
March 25, 1970	23	Agricultural Products Co-operative Marketing Act, An Act to amend the	C-183
March 25, 1970	24	Appropriation Act No. 1, 1970	C-200
March 25, 1970	25	Appropriation Act No. 2, 1970	C-201
March 25, 1970	26	Cape Breton Development Corporation Act, An Act to amend the	C-138
March 25, 1970	27	Coastal Fisheries Protection Act, An Act to amend the	C-134
March 25, 1970	28	Deep Sea Fisheries Act, An Act to repeal the	C-133
March 25, 1970	29	Dominion Coal Board Dissolution Act	C-161
March 25, 1970	30	Motor Vehicle Safety Act	C-137
March 25, 1970	31	Parole Act, An Act to amend the	S-19
March 25, 1970	32	Saltfish Act	C-175
March 25, 1970	33	Statute Law (Supplementary Retirement Benefits) Amendment Act, 1970	C-194
March 25, 1970	34	Textile Labelling Act	S-20
May 13, 1970	35	Canada Shipping Act, An Act to amend the	C-10
May 13, 1970	36	International Development Research Centre Act	C-12
May 13, 1970	37	Radiation Emitting Devices Act	S-14
May 13, 1970	38	Yukon Placer Mining Act, An Act to amend the	S-4
June 11, 1970	39	Criminal Code, An Act to amend the	C-3
June 11, 1970	40	Criminal Records Act	C-5
June 11, 1970	41	Expropriation Act	C-136
June 11, 1970	42	Industrial Research and Development Incentives Act, An Act to amend the	C-193
June 11, 1970	43	Oil and Gas Production and Conservation Act, An Act to amend the	S-5
June 11, 1970	44	Supreme Court Act, An Act to amend the	C-182
June 26, 1970	45	Aeronautics Act, An Act respecting regulations made pursuant to section 4 of the	C-218
June 26, 1970	46	Appropriation Act No. 3, 1970	C-224
June 26, 1970	47	Arctic Waters Pollution Prevention Act	C-202
June 26, 1970	48	Bills of Exchange Act, An Act to amend the	C-208
June 26, 1970	49	Canada Elections Act	C-215
June 26, 1970	50	Canada Labour (Standards) Code, An Act to amend the	C-214
June 26, 1970	51	Canada Shipping Act, An Act to postpone the expiration of certain provisions of An Act to amend the	S-23
June 26, 1970	52	Canada Water Act	C-144
June 26, 1970	53	Electoral Boundaries Readjustment Act, An Act respecting the (Perth–Wilmot)	C-62
June 26, 1970	54	Electoral Boundaries Readjustment Act, An Act respecting the (Sarnia–Lambton)	C-75
June 26, 1970	55	Electoral Boundaries Readjustment Act, An Act respecting the (Burnaby–Richmond–Delta)	C-130
June 26, 1970	56	Electoral Boundaries Readjustment Act, An Act respecting the (Glengarry–Prescott–Russell)	C-153
June 26, 1970	57	Electoral Boundaries Readjustment Act, An Act respecting the (Brome–Missisquoi)	C-162
June 26, 1970	58	Electoral Boundaries Readjustment Act, An Act respecting the (Wellington–Grey–Dufferin–Waterloo)	C-168
June 26, 1970	59	Electoral Boundaries Readjustment Act, An Act respecting the (Maisonneuve–Rosemont)	C-177
June 26, 1970	60	Electoral Boundaries Readjustment Act, An Act respecting the (Argenteuil–Deux Montagnes)	C-178
June 26, 1970	61	Electoral Boundaries Readjustment Act, An Act respecting the (Lanark–Renfrew–Carleton)	C-213
June 26, 1970	62	Excise Act, An Act to amend the	C-209
June 26, 1970	63	Fisheries Act, An Act to amend the	C-204
June 26, 1970	64	Law Reform Commission Act	C-186
June 26, 1970	65	National Energy Board Act, An Act to amend the	C-190
June 26, 1970	66	Northern Inland Waters Act	C-187
June 26, 1970	67	Nuclear Liability Act	C-158
June 26, 1970	68	Territorial Sea and Fishing Zones Act, An Act to amend the	C-203
June 26, 1970	69	Yukon Act, the Northwest Territories Act and the Territorial Lands Act, An Act to amend the	C-212
October 7, 1970	70	Canada Corporations Act and other statutory provisions related to the subject matter of certain of those amendments, An Act to amend the	C-4
October 7, 1970	71	Hudson’s Bay Company Act	S-25
October 7, 1970	72	Shipping Conferences Exemption Act	C-184
October 7, 1970	73	Standards Council of Canada Act	C-163

===== Local and private acts =====
Date of Assent	Index	Title	Bill Number
Various dates	74	Pitts Insurance Company, An Act to incorporate	S-10
Various dates	75	Pitts Life Insurance Company, An Act to incorporate	S-11
Various dates	76	McOuat Investments Limited, An Act respecting	S-15
Various dates	77	Buccaneer Industries Ltd., An Act respecting	S-16
Various dates	78	ICG Transmission Limited, An Act to incorporate	S-17
Various dates	79	Brunner Corporation (Canada) Limited, An Act respecting	S-18
Various dates	80	National Farmers Union, An Act to incorporate	S-22

==== 3rd Session ====
===== Public acts =====
Date of Assent	Index	Title	Bill Number
December 3, 1970	1	Federal Court Act	C-172
December 3, 1970	2	Public Order (Temporary Measures) Act, 1970	C-181
December 18, 1970	3	Anti-dumping Act, An Act to amend the	S-6
December 18, 1970	4	Appropriation Act No. 4, 1970	C-211
December 18, 1970	5	Buffalo and Fort Erie Public Bridge Company, An Act to amend An Act respecting the	C-179
December 18, 1970	6	Canada Cooperative Associations Act	C-177
December 18, 1970	7	Canada Grain Act	C-175
December 18, 1970	8	Merchant Seamen Compensation Act, An Act to amend the	C-188
December 18, 1970	9	Old Age Security Act, An Act to amend the	C-202
December 18, 1970	10	Regional Development Incentives Act, An Act to amend the	C-205
December 18, 1970	11	Tax Review Board Act	C-174
February 11, 1971	12	Emergency Gold Mining Assistance Act, An Act to amend the	C-4
February 11, 1971	13	Leprosy Act, An Act to repeal the	S-7
February 11, 1971	14	New Zealand Trade Agreement (Amendment) Act	S-4
February 11, 1971	15	Statistics Act	S-2
March 11, 1971	16	Canada–Jamaica Income Tax Agreement Act, 1971	C-217
March 11, 1971	17	Canadian National Railways Financing and Guarantee Act, 1970	C-186
March 11, 1971	18	Electoral Boundaries Readjustment Act (Toronto—Lakeshore)	C-211
March 11, 1971	19	Electoral Boundaries Readjustment Act (Bonaventure—Îles-de-la-Madeleine)	C-83
March 11, 1971	20	Electoral Boundaries Readjustment Act (Surrey—White Rock)	C-88
March 11, 1971	21	Electoral Boundaries Readjustment Act (Beauharnois—Salaberry)	C-178
March 11, 1971	22	Electoral Boundaries Readjustment Act (Montreal—Bourassa)	C-223
March 11, 1971	23	Export Development Act, An Act to amend the	C-184
March 11, 1971	24	Farm Improvement Loans Act et al., An Act to amend the	C-191
March 30, 1971	25	Appropriation Act No. 1, 1971	C-235
March 30, 1971	26	Appropriation Act No. 2, 1971	C-236
March 30, 1971	27	Canada Shipping Act, An Act to amend the	C-2
March 30, 1971	28	Canadian Environment Week	C-25
March 30, 1971	29	Crop Insurance Act, An Act to amend the	C-185
March 30, 1971	30	Income Tax Act, An Act to amend the	C-225
March 30, 1971	31	Pension Act et al., An Act to amend the	C-203
April 7, 1971	32	Civilian War Pensions and Allowances Act, An Act to amend the	C-232
April 7, 1971	33	Investment Companies Act	C-3
April 7, 1971	34	Pension Act, An Act to amend the	C-234
April 7, 1971	35	War Veterans Allowance Act, 1952, An Act to amend the	C-233
April 7, 1971	36	Weights and Measures Act	S-5
May 19, 1971	37	Bail Reform Act	C-218
May 19, 1971	38	Statutory Instruments Act	C-182
May 19, 1971	39	Textile and Clothing Board Act	C-215
June 10, 1971	40	Canada–Finland Supplementary Income Tax Convention Act, 1971	S-18
June 10, 1971	41	Consumer Packaging and Labelling Act	C-180
June 10, 1971	42	Government Organization Act, 1970	C-207
June 10, 1971	43	Income Tax Act (Revised Statutes of Canada, 1970)	S-15
June 10, 1971	44	Official Residences Act	C-241
June 10, 1971	45	Senate and House of Commons Act et al., An Act to amend the	C-242
June 23, 1971	46	Appropriation Act No. 3, 1971	C-249
June 23, 1971	47	Clean Air Act	C-224
June 23, 1971	48	Unemployment Insurance Act, 1971	C-229
June 30, 1971	49	Canada Development Corporation Act	C-219
June 30, 1971	50	Canada Labour (Standards) Code, An Act to amend the	C-228
June 30, 1971	51	Fort Falls Bridge Authority Act	S-14
June 30, 1971	52	Pilotage Act	C-246
June 30, 1971	53	Post Office Act, An Act to amend the	C-240
June 30, 1971	54	Prairie Grain Advance Payments Act, An Act to amend the	C-239
October 6, 1971	55	Judges Act et al., An Act to amend the	C-243
October 14, 1971	56	Employment Support Act	C-262
October 14, 1971	57	Northwest Atlantic Fisheries Convention Act, An Act to amend the	S-13
December 15, 1971	58	Appropriation Act No. 4, 1971	C-273
December 15, 1971	59	Weather Modification Information Act	S-11
December 23, 1971	60	Copyright Act, An Act to amend the	C-9
December 23, 1971	61	Customs Tariff, An Act to amend the	C-261
December 23, 1971	62	Excise Tax Act and Old Age Security Act, An Act to amend the	C-260
December 23, 1971	63	Income Tax Act, An Act to amend the	C-259
December 23, 1971	64	Income Tax Law Amendment Act, 1971	C-275
January 12, 1972	65	Farm Products Marketing Agencies Act	C-176

===== Local and private acts =====
Date of Assent	Index	Title	Bill Number
Various March 30 - December 15, 1972	66	Central-Del Rio Oils Limited, An Act respecting	S-12
Various March 30 - December 15, 1972	67	Royal Victoria Hospital, An Act respecting	S-19
Various March 30 - December 15, 1972	68	The Artisans, Life Insurance Cooperative Society Consolidated Act, 1971	S-10

==== 4th Session ====
===== Public acts =====
Date of Assent	Index	Title	Bill Number
March 29, 1972	1	Appropriation Act No. 1, 1972	C-175
March 29, 1972	2	Appropriation Act No. 2, 1972	C-176
March 29, 1972	3	Electoral Boundaries Readjustment Act, An Act respecting the (Essex–Windsor)	C-55
March 29, 1972	4	Electoral Boundaries Readjustment Act, An Act respecting the (High Park–Humber Valley)	C-74
March 29, 1972	5	Electoral Boundaries Readjustment Act, An Act respecting the (Renfrew North–Nipissing East)	C-92
March 29, 1972	6	Electoral Boundaries Readjustment Act, An Act respecting the (Rivière-du-Loup–Témiscouata)	C-172
March 29, 1972	7	Electoral Boundaries Readjustment Act, An Act respecting the (Trois-Rivières–Métropolitain)	C-167
March 29, 1972	8	Federal-Provincial Fiscal Arrangements Act, 1972	C-
March 29, 1972	9	Income Tax Act, An Act to amend the	C-169
May 19, 1972	10	Old Age Security Act, An Act to amend the	C-207
May 19, 1972	11	“Parliament Hill”, An Act respecting the use of the expression	C-78
May 19, 1972	12	Pension Act et al., An Act to amend the	C-208
June 15, 1972	13	Criminal Law Amendment Act, 1972	C-2
June 30, 1972	14	Adult Occupational Training Act, An Act to amend the	C-195
June 30, 1972	15	Appropriation Act No. 3, 1972	C-221
June 30, 1972	16	Canadian Wheat Board Act, An Act to amend the	C-204
June 30, 1972	17	Territorial Supreme Courts Act	S-3
July 7, 1972	18	Canada Labour Code, An Act to amend the	C-183
July 7, 1972	19	Farm Credit Act, An Act to amend the	C-5
July 7, 1972	20	Pension Act, An Act to amend the	C-215
July 7, 1972	21	Representation Commissioner Act, An Act to amend the	C-203
July 7, 1972	22	St. Lawrence Ports Operations Act	C-230
September 1, 1972	23	West Coast Ports Operations Act	C-231

===== Local and private acts =====
Date of Assent	Index	Title	Bill Number
March 29, 1972	24	Unity Bank of Canada, An Act to incorporate	C-164

== See also ==
- List of Canadian electoral districts (1966–1976) for a list of the ridings in this parliament.
