= John Lambert Gibson =

Canadian politician (1906-1986)

Member of the Canadian Parliament for Comox—Alberni
- In office 11 June 1945 – 9 August 1953
- Preceded by: Alan Webster Neill
- Succeeded by: Thomas Speakman Barnett

Personal details
- Born: 7 March 1906 Vancouver, British Columbia, Canada
- Died: 17 December 1986 (aged 80) Vancouver, British Columbia, Canada
- Party: BC Liberals (1950s); Independent (1949-1953); Independent Liberal (1945-1949)
- Spouse: Patricia Caldwell (m. 1938)
- Relations: Gordon Gibson, Sr. (brother)
- Occupation: logger; lumber merchant

John Lambert "Jack" Gibson (7 March 1906 – 17 December 1986) was an independent member of the House of Commons of Canada, representing the riding of Comox—Alberni from 1945 to 1953.

== Biography ==
Gibson was born in Vancouver, British Columbia, and attended Britannia Secondary School. A logger and lumber merchant by career, he ran the Gibson Lumber and Shingle Company with his elder brother, future member of the Legislative Assembly of British Columbia Gordon Gibson, Sr. John Gibson served as the company's president at one point. He married his wife Patricia in 1938; the couple had three children together.

He was first elected to Parliament at the Comox—Alberni riding in the 1945 federal election as an Independent Liberal candidate, then won re-election for a second term in 1949 as a purely independent member. He left federal office in 1953 and returned to the family business. He also became involved with the provincial Liberals, serving as the party's treasurer until 1956.

Gibson died on 17 December 1986 in Vancouver, aged 80.
