= Stephens & Towndrow =

Canadian radio advertising-sales representation firm

- Industry: Radio advertising sales
- Founded: 1951
- Founders: William "Bill" Stephens and Ernest "Ernie" P. Towndrow
- Fate: Merged into Slaight Communications / Standard Broadcast Sales
- Key people: Allan Slaight (President, 1967–early 1970s)
- Products: Radio and television ad sales, news-content syndication

Stephens & Towndrow (S&T) was a Canadian radio advertising-sales representation firm headquartered in Toronto, Ontario. Active primarily from the 1950s to the early 1970s, the company helped establish Canada’s national commercial-radio advertising market. It was regarded as one of the country’s leading “radio-rep” firms. The company was later owned by CBS (United States) before returning to Canadian control under broadcaster Allan Slaight. Its operations were gradually folded into Slaight’s media interests and the brand disappeared by the 1970s.

== History ==
=== Founding and early operations ===
Stephens & Towndrow was founded in 1951 by William "Bill" Stephens and Ernest "Ernie" P. Towndrow. By 1953 its clients already included CHML (Hamilton), CHUB (Nanaimo) and CJAV (Port Alberni). A Montreal office opened that year to serve Quebec. Towndrow later sat on the Canadian Broadcast Executives Society board (1965–66).

=== Acquisition by CBS ===
In the mid-1960s the firm was acquired by Columbia Broadcasting System (CBS, U.S.). It operated as “CBS-owned Stephens & Towndrow” and as an arm of “CBS Radio of Canada Ltd.” Towndrow, then vice-president of CBS Radio of Canada, resigned effective 1 January 1966. Shortly after, CBS network news in Canada moved from CFRB/CJAD to S&T clients CHUM and CKGM.

=== Return to Canadian ownership; Slaight era ===
CBS sold the agency to Canadian investors in 1967. Allan Slaight—fresh from Radio Caroline—became a consultant, then president and managing director the same year. Under Slaight, S&T represented 18 stations nationwide and added a small television division.

=== Services and innovations ===
In 1968 S&T launched NewsRadio, operated through Newsradio Limited in Ottawa. The service combined CBS News (U.S.), parliamentary coverage and local reporting; CKWW (Windsor) subscribed early. The firm also created a dedicated television-sales wing.

=== Decline and integration ===
Before Slaight’s arrival, several executives left to found Major Market Broadcasters (MMB), initially winning CHUM. Slaight himself formed Slaight Communications in 1970, buying CFGM (Toronto) and CFOX (Montreal). S&T’s business was absorbed into these holdings, and the name faded during the 1970s. Slaight’s 1985 purchase of Standard Broadcasting—and later mergers producing United Broadcast Sales and Canadian Broadcast Sales (1993)—completed the lineage.

== Notable clients ==
- CHML (Hamilton)
- CHUB (Nanaimo)
- CJAV (Port Alberni)
- CHUM-AM / CHUM-FM (Toronto)
- CJMS-AM / CJMS-FM (Montreal)
- CKY-AM / CKY-FM (Winnipeg)
- CFPL-AM / CFPL-FM (London, Ontario)
- CKEY (Toronto) – NewsRadio collaborator
- CKWW (Windsor) – NewsRadio subscriber

== See also ==
- Allan Slaight
- Standard Broadcasting
- History of broadcasting in Canada
