= CHWF-FM =

Radio station in Nanaimo, British Columbia

Coordinates: 49°13′19″N 124°00′12″W

- Nanaimo, British Columbia; Canada
- Frequency: 106.9 MHz
- Branding: 106.9 The Wolf

Programming
- Format: Active rock
- Affiliations: Nanaimo Clippers

Ownership
- Owner: Jim Pattison Group; (Island Radio)

History
- First air date: July 1, 1981
- Former call signs: CKEG (1981–2001)
- Former frequencies: 1350 kHz (1981–1995); 1570 kHz (1995–2002)
- Call sign meaning: WF for "Wolf"

Technical information
- Class: A
- ERP: 1,600 wattss average 3,000 watts peak
- HAAT: 95 metres (312 ft)

Links
- Webcast: Listen live
- Website: 106.9 The Wolf

CHWF-FM (106.9 The Wolf) is a Canadian radio station located in Nanaimo, British Columbia, Canada, operating on 106.9 FM under the ownership of Jim Pattison Group division Island Radio.

== History ==
CHWF signed on for the first time on July 1, 1981 on its original frequency of 1350 AM as CKEG, Nanaimo's second radio station (after the long-established CHUB), broadcasting a country format from the beginning and operating 24 hours a day with transmission power of 10,000 watts. The station was established by Central Island Broadcasting Ltd. (under the ownership of founders Bob Adshead and Ted Schellenberg), and from the beginning, operated with a local focus, both in its news reporting and in its service to the community.

In 1992, CKEG relocated to its present offices and studios in the north end of Nanaimo. Parent company Central Island Broadcasting, with approval from the CRTC, acquired Benchmark Ventures (the owner of CHUB at the time) in 1994, subsequently relocating CHUB to share CKEG's facilities, then switching CHUB to the FM band (on 102.3 MHz) and renaming it CKWV in 1995, while CKEG moved to the old CHUB frequency of 1570 AM; by 1999, CKEG switched music formats from country to oldies and adopted the on-air name Good Time Oldies.

CKEG would eventually also switch to FM, moving to its present frequency and becoming CHWF on September 28, 2001, with its current format of active rock; it continued simulcasting on 1570 AM until February 15, 2002. Central Island Broadcasting changed its corporate name to Island Radio in 2005, reflecting its expanded presence on Vancouver Island with the establishment of Courtenay station CKLR-FM, the ownership of Parksville stations CIBH-FM and CHPQ-FM, and the acquisition of Port Alberni station CJAV.

On November 1, 2005, the Jim Pattison Broadcast Group and Island Radio Ltd. announced that Island Radio had agreed to sell its six radio stations (including CHWF) to the Jim Pattison Broadcast Group; following CRTC approval, Pattison assumed control of the stations at midnight on June 30, 2006.

On July 24, 2020, CHWF morning show host Ron Jones retired after 31 years on the air.
