= CJAV-FM =

Radio station in Port Alberni, British Columbia

Coordinates: 49°16′40″N 124°46′56″W

- Port Alberni, British Columbia; Canada
- Broadcast area: Alberni Valley
- Frequency: 93.3 MHz
- Branding: 93.3 The Peak

Programming
- Format: Adult contemporary
- Affiliations: Alberni Valley Bulldogs

Ownership
- Owner: Jim Pattison Group; (Island Radio)

History
- First air date: April 1, 1946
- Former frequencies: 1240 kHz (1946–2004)
- Call sign meaning: Alberni Valley (broadcast area)

Technical information
- Class: A
- ERP: vertical polarization: 2,600 watts horizontal polarization: 6,000 watts
- HAAT: −219 metres (−719 ft)

Links
- Webcast: Listen Live
- Website: 933thepeak.com

CJAV-FM is a Canadian radio station broadcasting on 93.3 FM in Port Alberni, British Columbia. The station currently broadcasts an adult contemporary format branded on-air as 93.3 The Peak and is owned by Jim Pattison Group.

== History ==
CJAV began operations on April 1, 1946, on 1240 AM, using a 250-watt transmitter upon startup. The station, originally owned by Harold Warren, was the starting point for the careers of a number of broadcasters, including Jack Cullen (who later moved on to CKNW, then located in New Westminster), Joe Chesney (who went on to found Langley station CJJC [now CKST Vancouver] in 1963), George Cowie (later of CFUN Vancouver), Bob Switzer (later of Vancouver CBC Television station CBUT), Philip Barter (who moved on to CHEK-TV in Victoria and CHAN-TV in Vancouver) and Jim Robson (who became the radio voice of the NHL's Vancouver Canucks on CKNW).

A year after CJAV signed on, Warren sold 50% of the station to CKNW founder Bill Rea, with Chuck Rudd and Ken Hutcheson later acting as station managers under Rea. In 1952, Warren sold his remaining ownership stake to Rudd and Hutcheson. In 1960, CJAV's operating power increased to 1,000 watts in the daytime, remaining at 250 watts at night, and the station was on hand to cover the aftermath of the tsunami that affected the then-twin cities of Port Alberni and Alberni on March 27, 1964, following the Good Friday earthquake that hit Anchorage, Alaska earlier that day.

CJAV, an affiliate of CBC Radio since sign-on in 1946, was authorized by the CRTC on June 5, 1984, to disaffiliate from the network after CBC established Port Alberni repeater station CBTQ-FM, originally a rebroadcaster of Vancouver station CBU (now rebroadcasting CBCV-FM in Victoria), in December 1983. On December 13, 1984, CJAV increased its transmission power to 1,000 watts day and night, and in early 1987, the station began broadcasting 24 hours a day, with overnight programming coming from the Toronto-based Satellite Radio Network.

On June 25, 2004, CJAV was purchased by Central Island Broadcasting Ltd. (now Island Radio). On April 18, 2005, Island Radio received approval from the CRTC to switch CJAV over to the FM band on 93.3 MHz with operating power of 6,000 watts; the switch took place on September 2 (with simulcasting on its old 1240 AM frequency continuing until early December) and the station adopted its current mixed format of adult contemporary and active rock. On June 22, original CJAV owner Harold Warren died at age 90.

On November 1, 2005, Pattison and Island Radio announced that Island Radio Ltd. of Nanaimo, B.C. had agreed to sell its six radio stations (and related assets) to the Jim Pattison Broadcast Group. The stations involved in the transaction include CJAV, CKWV-FM and CHWF-FM in Nanaimo, CIBH-FM and CHPQ-FM in Parksville-Qualicum Beach and CKLR-FM in Courtenay.

With the approval of the CRTC, Jim Pattison assumed ownership of the Island Radio stations (including CJAV) at midnight on June 30, 2006.

On April 1, 2006, CJAV (The Peak) celebrated its 60th anniversary serving the Alberni Valley. Recent well wishers calling into the station included BC Premier Gordon Campbell, BC Lieutenant Governor Iona Campagnolo, Port Alberni-born "Man in Motion" Rick Hansen, legendary CKNW broadcaster Jim Robson, and Port Alberni mayor Ken McRae.

In 2014 afternoon host Jolie McMullan departed the station for a position at the Alberni Valley Bulldogs.

As of January 1, 2022, on-air staff consisted of: Evan Hammond - morning host & play-by-play voice of the Alberni Valley Bulldogs (BCHL), David Wiwchar - Morning News & Operations / Sales Manager, Graeme Tait - Midday Host, Dalton Derkson - Afternoon Drive host.
