= Henry McQuillan =

Canadian politician

Henry Carwithen McQuillan

Member of Parliament for Comox—Alberni
- In office March 1958 – June 1962
- Preceded by: Thomas Speakman Barnett
- Succeeded by: Thomas Speakman Barnett

Personal details
- Born: 30 September 1906 Courtenay, Canada
- Died: 28 April 1979 (aged 72)
- Party: Progressive Conservative
- Spouse: Lucy Anne Brocklehurst
- Profession: Contractor, logger

Henry Carwithen McQuillan (30 September 1906 – 28 April 1979) was a Progressive Conservative party member of the House of Commons of Canada. Born in Courtenay, British Columbia, he was a contractor and logger by career.

He made an unsuccessful attempt to defeat CCF incumbent Thomas Speakman Barnett at the Comox—Alberni riding in the 1957 federal election. McQuillan succeeded in the 1958 election, serving in the 24th Parliament before Barnett retook the riding in the 1962 election.

McQuillan also served as a school trustee at one time.
