= CKWV-FM =

Radio station in Nanaimo, British Columbia

Coordinates: 49°13′19″N 124°00′12″W

- Nanaimo, British Columbia; Canada
- Frequency: 102.3 MHz
- Branding: 102.3 The Wave

Programming
- Format: Hot adult contemporary

Ownership
- Owner: Jim Pattison Group; (Island Radio)

History
- First air date: May 24, 1949
- Former call signs: CHUB (1949–1995)
- Former frequencies: 1570 kHz (1949–1995)
- Call sign meaning: WV for Wave

Technical information
- Class: A
- ERP: 1.3 kWs; 3 kW (maximum)
- HAAT: 95 metres (312 ft)

Links
- Webcast: Listen live
- Website: 1023thewave.com

CKWV-FM (102.3 The Wave) is a Canadian radio station located in Nanaimo, British Columbia. It broadcasts on 102.3 FM and is owned by Island Radio, a division of the Jim Pattison Group.

== History ==
CKWV first signed on-air on May 24, 1949, as CHUB, on its original frequency of 1570 AM with a 250-watt transmitter, with its studio in the Malaspina Hotel on Front Street in downtown Nanaimo; its first program was a broadcast of the annual Empire Day Parade. CHUB (so named because of Nanaimo's nickname of the "Hub City") was initially owned by George Randall and Vancouver Sun part-owner Donald Cromie, and its initial on-air staff included Gordon Theedom and program director Glen Kristjan.

To expand its coverage to surrounding areas, CHUB increased its power to 1,000 watts in 1951, with Sun employees Chuck Rudd and Sheila Hassel arriving to manage the station; among the later staff at the station were evening DJ Larry Thomas (who joined that year), morning host Lyall Feltham (in 1956), news director Pat O'Neill and sports announcer Jim Robson (who arrived from Port Alberni's CJAV). In 1959, CHUB increased its power again to 10,000 watts and moved its transmitter from Nanaimo to neighboring Cedar. On October 1, 1960, the station covered the Nanaimo Chinatown fire which ended up destroying that historical area of the city.

In 1962, the Vancouver Sun sold CHUB to former CKNW and CKWX news director Bob Giles, CKNW broadcaster Jack Kyle and Joe Lawlor (former sales manager of CHAB in Moose Jaw, Saskatchewan), who formed the Nanaimo Broadcasting Co. Ltd. to run the station. By 1966, Joe Lawlor's brother George came from Moose Jaw to become station manager, with Ted Kelly becoming program director and Duane Bodeker taking over as morning show host.

CHUB relocated from the Malaspina Hotel to a new studio on Esplanade Street in downtown Nanaimo on April 15, 1968, with broadcasts of Nanaimo Clippers hockey games going live that year. In 1973, Marc Chambers began his broadcasting career at CHUB (he would spend five years there before moving to CJAV), and on December 3 that year, parent company Nanaimo Broadcasting put CHPQ on the air in Parksville as a semi-satellite of CHUB, with 1,000 watts of power on its original frequency of 1370 AM.

On June 6, 1986, the CRTC approved the purchase of CHUB and CHPQ from Nanaimo Broadcasting by Benchmark Ventures Inc. (headed by Gene Daniel, who became the general manager of both stations); the new owners began gearing CHUB toward community-oriented programming focusing on Nanaimo and the surrounding area. In 1994, Benchmark Ventures merged with Central Island Broadcasting Ltd. (now Island Radio), the owner of then-rival station CKEG, with the CRTC approving the newly merged company's application to move CHUB from 1570 AM to 102.3 FM and recall it as CKWV, and to put a rebroadcaster of CKWV in Parksville at 99.9 FM (as CKWV-FM-1). The switch took effect on January 2, 1995 (CKEG, by then CKWV's sister station, took over the 1570 frequency on the same day after moving from its original 1350 AM). As part of the merger, CKWV relocated from downtown to share CKEG's studios and offices at 4550 Wellington Road in north Nanaimo, and adopted a Hot AC format. The CHUB call letters have belonged to the former CKRD Radio in Red Deer, Alberta since 2000.

In 2005, Central Island Broadcasting, reflecting its expanded presence on Vancouver Island with the establishment of Courtenay station CKLR-FM and the acquisition of CJAV, changed its corporate name to Island Radio. On February 11 that year, Parksville's CKWV-FM-1 ceased rebroadcasting CKWV and became a separate station, assuming the callsign CHPQ-FM (not tied directly to the original CHPQ (AM), which moved to CKEG's old 1350 frequency and became CKCI on July 31, 1995, then moved to 88.5 FM and became CIBH-FM on January 14, 2002).

On November 1, 2005, the Jim Pattison Broadcast Group and Island Radio Ltd. announced that Island Radio had agreed to sell its six radio stations (including CKWV, plus related assets) to the Jim Pattison Broadcast Group; following CRTC approval, Pattison assumed ownership of the Island Radio stations at midnight on June 30, 2006.
