= Edward Allan Miller =

Canadian politician

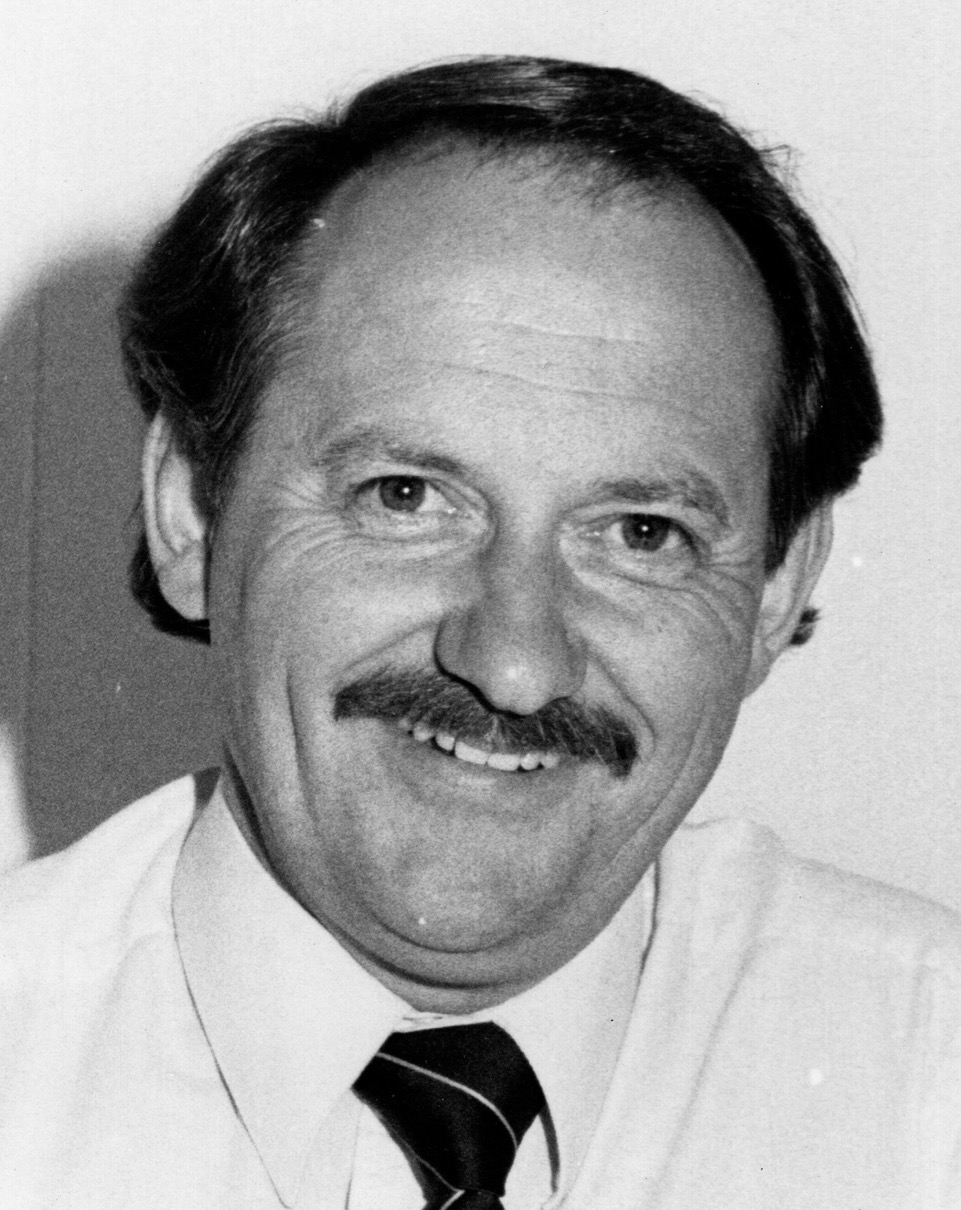

Edward 'Ted' Allan Miller (born 13 February 1942) was a Canadian politician from Nanaimo, British Columbia. He was a teacher and guidance counsellor by profession. Miller served as a New Democratic Party member of the House of Commons of Canada.

Born in New Westminster, British Columbia, Miller represented the Nanaimo—Alberni electoral district, winning that seat in the 1979 federal election. He was re-elected in 1980, but defeated in the 1984 election by Ted Schellenberg of the Progressive Conservative party. Miller served in the 31st and 32nd Canadian Parliaments.
