= 97.3 The Eagle =

97.3 The Eagle may refer to:

- CKLR-FM, a Canadian radio station broadcasting at 97.3 FM in Courtenay, British Columbia
- WGH-FM, an American radio station broadcasting at 97.3 FM in Hampton Roads, Virginia
