= Alan Webster Neill =

Canadian politician

Alan Webster Neill (October 6, 1868 - July 7, 1960) was a Canadian politician. He was elected as MLA for the riding of Alberni in 1889 and 1900 serving until 1903. He was Alderman on the first Council of the newly incorporated Town of Alberni (1912) and Mayor from 1916 to 1917.

Neill was MP for the riding of Comox—Alberni from December 6, 1921, to June 10, 1945.

He arrived in the Alberni Valley in 1891 as a farmer and business owner of Pioneer Feed Store. From about 1908 to 1911 Neill was the Indian Agent for the West Coast of Vancouver Island enforcing federal government policies of assimilation and the residential school system.

He was first elected to the House of Commons of Canada during the 1921 Election as the Progressive member for Comox-Alberni, British Columbia. Though in his maiden speech in the House during the Address in Reply to the Governor General's Speech on March 16, 1922, he referred to himself as "the only Independent elected to this House... elected by an entirely independent convention of those opposed to the late Meighen Government".

In 1925 Neill was re-elected as an Independent and was re-elected four more times before retiring at the 1945 federal election. Throughout the six general elections he contested he was never opposed by a candidate for the Liberal Party of Canada.

Neill was an ardent and vocal opponent of Asian and Japanese immigration and advocated for a white British Columbia. Enumerating his platform during the Address in Reply in his Maiden Speech on March 16, 1922, his first four priorities were; "Opposition to the Meighen Government", "Abolition of purse seine and trap licenses", "Licenses -that is, fishing licenses- to be granted only to white British subjects", "Immigration. Absolute exclusion of Asiatics.". He was also big proponent of the Chinese Exclusion Act. While defending it in the house of commons on April 15, 1924, he referred to the effects the legislation would have on diminishing the Chinese population in Canada as "...the final solution of the Chinese question in Canada."

He stated other priorities to be: Dominion enactment of the British Columbia eight hour law. The passing of an Old Age Pension Act. Extension of time on payments due under the Dominion Soldier Settlement Act. More considerate treatment of disabled soldiers, their widows and dependents. The elimination of overlapping of areas covered by federal and provincial police.

At the end of his speech he stated: "The important planks are those with reference to the restriction of Japanese control of the fishing industry, the immigration of Asiatics, the eight hour law, old age pensions. The others are more or less minor matters... We stand for a white British Columbia. Mr. Speaker, we in British Columbia are sick to death of seeing and hearing people who "stand for a white British Columbia." The time for that has passed; we want them to stop standing, pick up their feet, move ahead, make some progress toward bringing about a white British Columbia."

He was a member of the anti Asiatic League, fighting against rights for Japanese and Chinese Canadians from at least the 1920s on.

Neill was a strong proponent of Japanese internment and spoke of his distrust of Japanese-Canadians during a speech in February 1942. "The fellow dressed up like a white man, speaking our language glibly, is the one who should be interned."

Amidst the Second World War during a debate in 1943 about Japanese Internment, fellow MP Angus MacInnis described Neill's statements as "flesh-creeping". In that speech Neill described Japanese and Chinese Canadians as "a cancer" of "unassimilable people" and that Japanese interned in camps across Canada be deported to Japan after the end of the war.

A Middle School in Port Alberni was named A W Neill Middle School in his honour.

Neill Street in the City of Port Alberni, BC is named for him as well as, presumably, the street of the same name in Tofino, BC.

In 2002, Christopher Stevenson, a student at Malaspina University College, discovered evidence of Neill's racist legacy while doing a history paper on Japanese Internment for a university course. Some years later during a discussion on social media, he brought up his findings with Christopher Alemany, a city councillor for Port Alberni, and Rosemarie Buchanan, a school trustee with School District 70. They took the issue to their respective elected bodies for consideration and removal of his name from the street and school. City Council refused to take action, despite Alemany's efforts, but the school district kept the door open on changing the school's name, pending research and policy work on the issue of renaming generally.

In 2018, it was discovered that Neill had a racist covenant placed on his house in Port Alberni (built in 1909), forbidding any persons of Asian descent from living in it, aside from servants. Students from Alberni District Secondary School in Port Alberni, BC successfully petitioned to have the covenant removed from the house title.

On February 11, 2020, the board of education for School District 70 voted unanimously to remove the name A.W. Neill from the school.

The issue of the street name has not been revisited since 2017.
