= Nanaimo—Alberni =

Former federal electoral district in British Columbia, Canada

Coordinates: 49.229°N 125.035°W

British Columbia electoral district
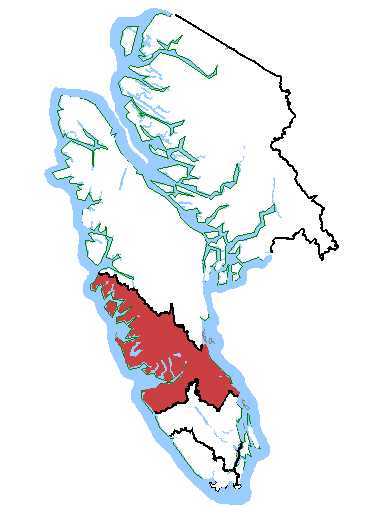
- Nanaimo—Alberni in relation to other Vancouver Island federal electoral districts

Defunct federal electoral district
- Legislature: House of Commons
- District created: 1996
- District abolished: 2013
- First contested: 1997
- Last contested: 2011
- District webpage: profile, map

Demographics
- Population (2011): 127,275
- Electors (2011): 95,882
- Area (km²): 8,324.98
- Census subdivision(s): Nanaimo, Port Alberni, Parksville, Qualicum Beach, Nanaimo E, Nanaimo F, Nanaimo G, Nanaimo H, Lantzville, Alberni-Clayoquot E,

Nanaimo—Alberni was a federal electoral district in British Columbia, Canada, that was represented in the House of Commons of Canada from 1979 to 1988. It was subsequently recreated and was represented in the House of Commons from 1997 to 2015.

== Demographics ==
Population, 2001	112,972
Electors	87,088
Area (km^{2})	8,324.98
Population density (people per km^{2})	15.3

Nanaimo—Alberni has the highest median age of all federal electoral districts in Canada (50.1 years of age).

== Geography ==
From 1979 to 1988, it consisted of:

- the Alberni-Clayoquot Regional District,
- the Nanaimo Regional District,
- (Lasqueti Island and the adjacent smaller islands in the Powell River Regional District,
- the northwest part of Electoral Area H of the Cowichan Valley Regional District.

The present district includes Lasqueti Island, the Regional District of Alberni-Clayoquot, and all of the Regional District of Nanaimo except the extreme southeastern part, including but the extreme northern part of Nanaimo. The southern part of Nanaimo is part of the Nanaimo—Cowichan electoral district.

== History ==
This electoral district was originally created in 1976 from parts of Comox—Alberni and Nanaimo—Cowichan—The Islands ridings.

It was abolished in 1987 when it was redistributed into Comox—Alberni and Nanaimo—Cowichan. It was then re-created in 1996 from those two ridings.

The 2012 electoral redistribution will see this riding dissolved into the new ridings of Courtenay—Alberni and Nanaimo—Ladysmith for the 2015 election.

=== Members of Parliament ===
This riding has elected the following members of Parliament:

Parliament	Years	Member	Party
Riding created from Comox—Alberni and Nanaimo—Cowichan—The Islands
31st	1979–1980	Edward Allan Miller	New Democratic
32nd	1980–1984	Edward Allan Miller	New Democratic
33rd	1984–1988	Ted Schellenberg	Progressive Conservative
Riding dissolved into Comox—Alberni and Nanaimo—Cowichan
Riding re-created from Comox—Alberni and Nanaimo—Cowichan
36th	1997–2000	Bill Gilmour	Reform
36th	2000–2000	Bill Gilmour	Alliance
37th	2000–2003	James Lunney	Alliance
37th	2003–2004	James Lunney	Conservative
38th	2004–2006	James Lunney	Conservative
39th	2006–2008	James Lunney	Conservative
40th	2008–2011	James Lunney	Conservative
41st	2011–2015	James Lunney	Conservative
41st	2015–2015	James Lunney	Independent
Riding dissolved into Courtenay—Alberni and Nanaimo—Ladysmith

== Election results ==
=== Nanaimo—Alberni, 1997–2015 ===
2011 Canadian federal election
Party	Candidate	Votes	%	±%	Expenditures
Conservative	James Lunney	30,469	46.42	–0.26	$79,910.36
New Democratic	Zeni Maartman	25,165	38.34	+6.58	$64,105.10
Liberal	Renée Amber Miller	4,984	7.59	–1.41	$27,871.89
Green	Myron Jespersen	4,482	6.83	–5.20	$20,060.86
Pirate	Jesse Schroeder	363	0.55	–	$713.52
Christian Heritage	Frank Wagner	94	0.14	–0.14	$82.96
Marxist–Leninist	Barbara Biley	81	0.12	–0.13	none listed
Total valid votes/expense limit		65,638	99.75	–	$99,229.49
Total rejected ballots		165	0.25	+0.05	
Turnout		65,803	66.70	+1.93	
Eligible voters		98,657			
Conservative hold		Swing		–3.42	
Source: Elections Canada

2008 Canadian federal election
Party	Candidate	Votes	%	±%	Expenditures
Conservative	James Lunney	28,930	46.68	+5.31	$71,511.91
New Democratic	Zeni Maartman	19,680	31.75	–0.47	$44,594.95
Green	John Fryer	7,457	12.03	+6.68	$22,632.06
Liberal	Richard Pesik	5,578	9.00	–10.05	$4,622.66
Christian Heritage	Frank Wagner	176	0.28	+0.07	$38.52
Marxist–Leninist	Barbara Biley	155	0.25	+0.10	none listed
Total valid votes/expense limit		61,976	99.80	–	$95,018.96
Total rejected ballots		124	0.20	–0.04	
Turnout		62,100	64.77	–4.00	
Eligible voters		95,882			
Conservative hold		Swing		+2.89	
Source: Elections Canada

2006 Canadian federal election
Party	Candidate	Votes	%	±%	Expenditures
Conservative	James Lunney	26,102	41.36	+2.30	$82,990.52
New Democratic	Manjeet Uppal	20,335	32.23	–0.08	$77,864.11
Liberal	Jim Stewart	12,023	19.05	–0.80	$26,693.07
Green	David Wright	3,379	5.35	–2.00	$1,413.15
Independent	R.L. Dusty Miller	920	1.46	–	$2,952.43
Christian Heritage	Frank Wagner	136	0.22	–	$230.61
Canadian Action	Jen Fisher-Bradley	113	0.18	–0.16	$1,312.11
Marxist–Leninist	Barbara Biley	94	0.15	+0.01	none listed
Total valid votes/expense limit		63,102	99.76	–	$86,819.92
Total rejected ballots		149	0.24	–0.05	
Turnout		63,251	68.77	+0.51	
Eligible voters		91,974			
Conservative hold		Swing		+1.19	
Source: Elections Canada

2004 Canadian federal election
Party	Candidate	Votes	%	±%	Expenditures
Conservative	James Lunney	23,158	39.07	–21.54	$60,734.86
New Democratic	Scott Fraser	19,152	32.31	+17.78	$41,238.00
Liberal	Hira Chopra	11,770	19.86	–0.84	$28,463.45
Green	David Wright	4,357	7.35	–	$9,530.26
Marijuana	Michael Mann	560	0.94	–1.20	none listed
Canadian Action	Diana E. Lifton	201	0.34	–	none listed
Marxist–Leninist	Barbara Biley	80	0.13	–	none listed
Total valid votes/expense limit		59,278	99.72	–	$85,341.38
Total rejected ballots		169	0.28	–0.02	
Turnout		59,447	68.26	+3.32	
Eligible voters		87,088			
Conservative hold		Swing		–19.66	
Conservative vote is compared to the total of the Canadian Alliance vote and Progressive Conservative vote in 2000 election.
Source: Elections Canada

2000 Canadian federal election
Party	Candidate	Votes	%	±%	Expenditures
Alliance	James Lunney	26,516	50.45	+0.59	$42,263
Liberal	Hira Chopra	10,877	20.70	–0.21	$39,235
New Democratic	Bill Holdom	7,635	14.53	–7.67	$7,246
Progressive Conservative	Bill McCullough	5,340	10.16	+4.98	$8,619
Marijuana	Donald Lavallee	1,125	2.14	–	$9
Independent	Brunie Brunie	830	1.58	–	$616
Natural Law	Marty Howe	235	0.45	–0.11	none listed
Total valid votes		52,558	99.69		
Total rejected ballots		163	0.31	–0.05	
Turnout		52,721	64.94	–2.19	
Eligible voters		81,188			
Alliance hold		Swing		+0.40	
Canadian Alliance change is compared to the Reform Party in the 1997 election.
Source: Elections Canada

1997 Canadian federal election
Party	Candidate	Votes	%	±%	Expenditures
Reform	Bill Gilmour	25,069	49.86	–	$36,473
New Democratic	Bill Holdom	11,162	22.20	–	$35,683
Liberal	David Lobay	10,513	20.91	–	$52,031
Progressive Conservative	Garry Shepp	2,602	5.18	–	$18,929
Green	David Martin	650	1.29	–	none listed
Natural Law	Cliff Brown	282	0.56	–	$120
Total valid votes		50,278	99.64		
Total rejected ballots		181	0.36		
Turnout		50,459	67.13		
Eligible voters		75,168			
Reform notional hold		Swing		–	
This riding was created from parts of Comox—Alberni and Nanaimo—Cowichan, both of which elected a Reform Party candidate in the previous election. Bill Gilmour was the incumbent from Comox—Alberni.
Source: Elections Canada

=== Nanaimo—Alberni, 1979–1988 ===
1984 Canadian federal election
Party	Candidate	Votes	%	±%
Progressive Conservative	Ted Schellenberg	27,410	45.81	+11.00
New Democratic	Edward Allan Miller	25,659	42.88	–6.31
Liberal	Joe Martin	5,922	9.90	–4.39
Green	Aileen Fletcher	529	0.88	–
Communist	Mark Fulmore Mosher	231	0.39	+0.03
Independent	Louis James Lesosky	83	0.14	–
Total valid votes		59,834	99.68	
Total rejected ballots		190	0.32	+0.09
Turnout		60,024	78.82	+6.63
Eligible voters		76,153		
Progressive Conservative gain from New Democratic		Swing		+8.66
Source: Elections Canada

1980 Canadian federal election
Party	Candidate	Votes	%	±%
New Democratic	Edward Allan Miller	24,082	49.20	+5.22
Progressive Conservative	Scott Van Alstine	17,040	34.81	+0.79
Liberal	Cecile McKinnon	6,994	14.29	–7.15
Rhinoceros	Frank Tee Pee Red Coffey	591	1.21	–
Communist	Gary William Swann	173	0.35	–0.06
Marxist–Leninist	Allan H. Bezanson	69	0.14	–0.01
Total valid votes		48,949	99.77	
Total rejected ballots		111	0.23	+0.01
Turnout		49,060	72.19	–4.16
Eligible voters		67,959		
New Democratic hold		Swing		+2.22
Source: Elections Canada

1979 Canadian federal election
Party	Candidate	Votes	%	±%
New Democratic	Edward Allan Miller	21,304	43.98	–
Progressive Conservative	Scott Van Alstine	16,478	34.02	–
Liberal	Hugh Alan Anderson	10,385	21.44	–
Communist	Mark Fulmore Mosher	199	0.41	–
Marxist–Leninist	Katie Fraser	74	0.15	–
Total valid votes		48,440	99.78	
Total rejected ballots		105	0.22	–
Turnout		48,545	76.35	–
Eligible voters		63,581		
This riding was created from parts of Comox—Alberni and Nanaimo—Cowichan—The Islands, which elected a Liberal and a New Democrat, respectively, in the previous election. Hugh Alan Anderson was the incumbent from Comox—Alberni.
Source: Elections Canada

== See also ==
- List of Canadian electoral districts
- Historical federal electoral districts of Canada
