= Comox—Alberni =

Former federal electoral district in British Columbia, Canada

British Columbia electoral district

Defunct federal electoral district
- Legislature: House of Commons
- District created: 1987
- District abolished: 1996
- First contested: 1988
- Last contested: 1993

Comox—Alberni was a federal electoral district in British Columbia, Canada, that was represented in the House of Commons of Canada from 1917 to 1979, and again from 1988 to 1993.

== History ==
This riding was created in 1914 from parts of Comox—Atlin riding.

It was abolished in 1976 when it was redistributed into Comox—Powell River and Nanaimo—Alberni ridings.

It was recreated in 1987 from parts of those two ridings. The new riding consisted of:

- the town of Comox;
- the city of Courtenay;
- Electoral Areas A, B and C of Comox-Strathcona Regional District;
- the Alberni-Clayoquot Regional District;
- Electoral Areas E, F, G and H of Nanaimo Regional District;
- that part of Electoral Area C of Nanaimo Regional District lying west of the east boundary of Dunsmuir Land District;
- Electoral Area E of Powell River Regional District;
- the Village of Cumberland; and
- the towns of Parksville and Qualicum Beach.

The electoral district was abolished in 1996 when it was merged into Nanaimo—Alberni riding.

== Members of Parliament ==
Parliament	Years	Member	Party
Riding created from Comox—Atlin
13th	1917–1921	Herbert Sylvester Clements	Government (Unionist)
14th	1921–1925	Alan Webster Neill	Progressive
15th	1925–1926	Alan Webster Neill	Independent
16th	1926–1930	Alan Webster Neill	Independent
17th	1930–1935	Alan Webster Neill	Independent
18th	1935–1940	Alan Webster Neill	Independent
19th	1940–1945	Alan Webster Neill	Independent
20th	1945–1949	John Lambert Gibson	Independent Liberal
21st	1949–1953	John Lambert Gibson	Independent
22nd	1953–1957	Thomas Speakman Barnett	Co-operative Commonwealth
23rd	1957–1958	Thomas Speakman Barnett	Co-operative Commonwealth
24th	1958–1962	Henry McQuillan	Progressive Conservative
25th	1962–1963	Thomas Speakman Barnett	New Democratic
26th	1963–1965	Thomas Speakman Barnett	New Democratic
27th	1965–1968	Thomas Speakman Barnett	New Democratic
28th	1968–1969	Richard Durante	Liberal
28th	1969–1972	Thomas Speakman Barnett	New Democratic
29th	1972–1974	Thomas Speakman Barnett	New Democratic
30th	1974–1979	Hugh Alan Anderson	Liberal
Riding dissolved into Comox—Powell River and Nanaimo—Alberni
Riding re-created from Comox—Powell River and Nanaimo—Alberni
34th	1988–1993	Bob Skelly	New Democratic
35th	1993–1997	Bill Gilmour	Reform
Riding dissolved into Nanaimo—Alberni

== Election results ==
=== Comox—Alberni, 1988–1993 ===
1993 Canadian federal election
Party	Candidate	Votes	%	±%
Reform	Bill Gilmour	25,000	44.17	+34.22
Liberal	Lonnie W. Hindle	11,534	20.38	+3.79
New Democratic	Bob Skelly	9,365	16.55	–26.28
Progressive Conservative	Mike Hicks	5,461	9.65	–18.65
National	Ernest Daley	3,283	5.80	–
Green	Richard Porter	1,313	2.32	+1.25
Natural Law	Kathleen Lapeyrouse	299	0.53	–
Independent	Kenneth R. Foster	276	0.49	–
Canada Party	Genther Heinrich Smuda	72	0.13	–
Total valid votes		56,603	99.65	
Total rejected ballots		199	0.35	+0.05
Turnout		56,802	70.80	–9.30
Eligible voters		80,233		
Reform gain from New Democratic		Swing		+14.92
Source: Elections Canada

1988 Canadian federal election
Party	Candidate	Votes	%	±%
New Democratic	Bob Skelly	21,128	42.83	–
Progressive Conservative	Darlene Weir	13,959	28.30	–
Liberal	Ray J. Rogers	8,182	16.59	–
Reform	Gary Hein	4,905	9.94	–
Green	Jim Bohlen	528	1.07	–
Christian Heritage	Ivan R. Zalinko	478	0.97	–
Communist	Gary William Swann	151	0.31	–
Total valid votes		49,331	99.70	
Total rejected ballots		150	0.30	–
Turnout		49,481	80.09	–
Eligible voters		61,779		
This riding was created from parts of Comox—Powell River and Nanaimo—Alberni, which elected a New Democrat and a Progressive Conservative, respectively, in the last election. Neither of the incumbents ran in this election.
Source: Elections Canada

=== Comox—Alberni, 1917–1974 ===
1974 Canadian federal election
Party	Candidate	Votes	%	±%
Liberal	Hugh Alan Anderson	13,594	35.74	+8.73
Progressive Conservative	Al Lazerte	12,683	33.34	+15.03
New Democratic	Don Barker	11,158	29.33	–20.35
Communist	Mark Fulmore Mosher	605	1.59	+0.22
Total valid votes		38,040	99.69	
Total rejected ballots		118	0.31	–2.17
Turnout		38,158	67.42	–3.75
Eligible voters		56,598		
Liberal gain from New Democratic		Swing		–3.15
Source: Library of Parliament

1972 Canadian federal election
Party	Candidate	Votes	%	±%
New Democratic	Thomas Speakman Barnett	17,477	49.68	+3.52
Liberal	Bob Chown	9,501	27.01	–18.22
Progressive Conservative	Jerry Sinnott	6,440	18.31	+9.71
Social Credit	Delbert Keith Doll	1,276	3.63	–
Independent	Mark Fulmore Mosher	483	1.37	–
Total valid votes		35,177	97.52	
Total rejected ballots		895	2.48	+2.48
Turnout		36,072	71.17	–
Eligible voters		50,687		
New Democratic hold		Swing		+10.86
Source: Library of Parliament

Canadian federal by-election, 8 April 1969 On election being declared void, 14 February 1969
Party	Candidate	Votes	%	±%
New Democratic	Thomas Speakman Barnett	12,612	46.17	+6.83
Liberal	Richard Durante	12,357	45.23	+5.87
Progressive Conservative	Blair McLean	2,350	8.60	–8.39
Total valid votes		27,319	100.00	
Total rejected ballots		unknown		
Turnout		27,319	–	–
Eligible voters				
New Democratic gain from Liberal		Swing		+0.48
Source: Library of Parliament

1968 Canadian federal election
Party	Candidate	Votes	%	±%
Liberal	Richard Durante	11,939	39.36	+15.34
New Democratic	Thomas Speakman Barnett	11,930	39.33	–5.84
Progressive Conservative	Blair McLean	5,154	16.99	+3.26
Social Credit	Jean-M.-Joseph Gagnon	997	3.29	–10.82
Communist	Mark Fulmore Mosher	311	1.03	–
Total valid votes		30,331	99.21	
Total rejected ballots		242	0.79	–0.17
Turnout		30,573	74.07	+2.14
Eligible voters		41,274		
Liberal gain from New Democratic		Swing		+10.59
Source: Library of Parliament

1965 Canadian federal election
Party	Candidate	Votes	%	±%
New Democratic	Thomas Speakman Barnett	13,393	45.17	+2.06
Liberal	Loran K. Jordon	7,122	24.02	–5.53
Social Credit	Jean M. Gagnon	4,183	14.11	+6.33
Progressive Conservative	Bill MacAdam	4,072	13.73	–5.82
Independent	John Alexander McKenzie	878	2.96	–
Total valid votes		29,648	99.03	
Total rejected ballots		289	0.97	+0.31
Turnout		29,937	71.94	–7.95
Eligible voters		41,616		
New Democratic hold		Swing		+3.79
Source: Library of Parliament

1963 Canadian federal election
Party	Candidate	Votes	%	±%
New Democratic	Thomas Speakman Barnett	13,449	43.12	+6.27
Liberal	William Campbell Moore	9,217	29.55	+2.50
Progressive Conservative	Alex W. Crouch	6,099	19.55	–3.24
Social Credit	Hazel Fee	2,428	7.78	–3.54
Total valid votes		31,193	99.34	
Total rejected ballots		206	0.66	–0.38
Turnout		31,399	79.89	+4.48
Eligible voters		39,303		
New Democratic hold		Swing		+1.88
Source: Library of Parliament

1962 Canadian federal election
Party	Candidate	Votes	%	±%
New Democratic	Thomas Speakman Barnett	10,474	36.85	–1.71
Liberal	William Campbell Moore	7,689	27.05	+17.13
Progressive Conservative	Henry McQuillan	6,478	22.79	–23.30
Social Credit	Jack Finnerty	3,219	11.32	+5.89
Communist	Mark Fulmore Mosher	567	2.00	–
Total valid votes		28,427	98.96	
Total rejected ballots		299	1.04	+0.25
Turnout		28,726	75.41	+0.34
Eligible voters		38,092		
New Democratic gain from Progressive Conservative		Swing		–9.42
Source: Library of Parliament

1958 Canadian federal election
Party	Candidate	Votes	%	±%
Progressive Conservative	Henry McQuillan	11,483	46.09	+15.10
Co-operative Commonwealth	Thomas Speakman Barnett	9,607	38.56	+2.67
Liberal	M. Stelling	2,472	9.92	–3.21
Social Credit	William S. Mullett	1,354	5.43	–14.56
Total valid votes		24,916	99.21	
Total rejected ballots		198	0.79	–0.06
Turnout		25,114	75.07	+5.23
Eligible voters		33,454		
Progressive Conservative gain from Co-operative Commonwealth		Swing		+7.56
Source: Library of Parliament

1957 Canadian federal election
Party	Candidate	Votes	%	±%
Co-operative Commonwealth	Thomas Speakman Barnett	8,598	35.89	+1.22
Progressive Conservative	Henry McQuillan	7,423	30.99	+20.84
Social Credit	Benjamin F. Wright	4,789	19.99	–4.25
Liberal	Alfred Carl Fillinger	3,146	13.13	–13.00
Total valid votes		23,956	99.16	
Total rejected ballots		204	0.84	–0.25
Turnout		24,160	69.84	+9.88
Eligible voters		34,595		
Co-operative Commonwealth hold		Swing		–9.81
Source: Library of Parliament

1953 Canadian federal election
Party	Candidate	Votes	%	±%
Co-operative Commonwealth	Thomas Speakman Barnett	6,115	34.67	–5.92
Liberal	Irving Wilson	4,609	26.13	–
Social Credit	Robert Harry Watson	4,275	24.24	–
Progressive Conservative	Eric Frederick Duncan	1,790	10.15	–
Labor–Progressive	William Stuart E. Morrison	850	4.82	–
Total valid votes		17,639	98.91	
Total rejected ballots		195	1.09	+0.37
Turnout		17,834	59.96	–5.21
Eligible voters		29,744		
Co-operative Commonwealth gain from Independent		Swing		–16.02
Source: Library of Parliament

1949 Canadian federal election
Party	Candidate	Votes	%	±%
Independent	John Lambert Gibson	11,397	59.42	+15.47
Co-operative Commonwealth	John Herdman Cameron	7,785	40.59	+12.52
Total valid votes		19,182	99.28	
Total rejected ballots		140	0.72	–0.59
Turnout		19,322	65.17	–13.60
Eligible voters		29,649		
Independent notional hold		Swing		Independent Liberal
Source: Library of Parliament

1945 Canadian federal election
Party	Candidate	Votes	%	±%
Independent Liberal	John Lambert Gibson	7,348	43.95	–
Co-operative Commonwealth	Thomas Speakman Barnett	4,692	28.06	+0.65
Trades Union	Nigel Morgan	4,679	27.99	–
Total valid votes		16,719	98.68	
Total rejected ballots		223	1.32	–0.87
Turnout		16,942	78.77	+6.17
Eligible voters		21,509		
Independent Liberal gain from Independent		Swing		+21.65
Source: Library of Parliament

1940 Canadian federal election
Party	Candidate	Votes	%	±%
Independent	Alan Webster Neill	10,156	72.59	+25.35
Co-operative Commonwealth	George Harrison Brown	3,835	27.41	+1.81
Total valid votes		13,991	97.81	
Total rejected ballots		313	2.19	–3.00
Turnout		14,304	72.60	–1.60
Eligible voters		19,703		
Independent hold		Swing		+11.77
Source: Library of Parliament

1935 Canadian federal election
Party	Candidate	Votes	%	±%
Independent	Alan Webster Neill	4,497	47.24	–16.11
Co-operative Commonwealth	Colin Cameron	2,437	25.60	–
Conservative	Reece Hague	1,509	15.85	–20.80
Labour	Malcolm Mackinnon	999	10.49	–
Reconstruction	Ernest Richard Tarling	78	0.82	–
Total valid votes		9,520	94.81	
Total rejected ballots		521	5.19	+5.19
Turnout		10,041	74.20	–8.78
Eligible voters		13,533		
Independent hold		Swing		–20.85
Source: Library of Parliament

1930 Canadian federal election
Party	Candidate	Votes	%	±%
Independent	Alan Webster Neill	5,651	63.35	+4.53
Conservative	Thomas Graham	3,270	36.66	–2.00
Total valid votes		8,921	100.00	
Total rejected ballots		unknown		
Turnout		8,921	82.98	+5.32
Eligible voters		10,751		
Independent hold		Swing		+3.26
Source: Library of Parliament

1926 Canadian federal election
Party	Candidate	Votes	%	±%
Independent	Alan Webster Neill	4,307	58.82	–9.27
Conservative	Donald Robert Macdonald	2,831	38.66	+6.75
Labour	John Edward Armishaw	185	2.53	–
Total valid votes		7,323	100.00	
Total rejected ballots		unknown		
Turnout		7,323	77.66	+1.26
Eligible voters		9,430		
Independent hold		Swing		–8.02
Source: Library of Parliament

1925 Canadian federal election
Party	Candidate	Votes	%	±%
Independent	Alan Webster Neill	4,794	68.09	+13.82
Conservative	Thomas Davis Coldicutt	2,247	31.91	–6.28
Total valid votes		7,041	100.00	
Total rejected ballots		unknown		
Turnout		7,041	76.40	+8.74
Eligible voters		9,216		
Independent gain from Progressive		Swing		+37.19
Independent candidate Alan Webster Neill gained 13.82 percentage points from his 1921 performance running as a Progressive candidate.
Source: Library of Parliament

1921 Canadian federal election
Party	Candidate	Votes	%	±%
Progressive	Alan Webster Neill	4,170	54.27	–
Conservative	Herbert Sylvester Clements	2,935	38.20	–24.62
United Farmers	John Edward Armishaw	579	7.54	–
Total valid votes		7,684	100.00	
Total rejected ballots		–		
Turnout		7,684	67.66	–26.30
Eligible voters		11,357		
Progressive gain from Government (Unionist)		Swing		+39.44
Conservative change is based on the results of the Unionists in the 1917 election.
Source: Library of Parliament

1917 Canadian federal election
Party	Candidate	Votes	%	±%
Government (Unionist)	Herbert Sylvester Clements	3,652	62.81	–
Opposition	William Wallace Burns McInnes	2,162	37.19	–
Total valid votes		5,814	100.00	
Total rejected ballots		–		
Turnout		5,814	93.96	–
Eligible voters		6,188		
This riding was created from Comox—Atlin, which elected Conservative member Herbert Sylvester Clements in the previous election.
Source: Library of Parliament

== See also ==
- List of Canadian electoral districts
- Historical federal electoral districts of Canada
