= Bill Gilmour (politician) =

Canadian politician

William Douglas Gilmour (born December 29, 1942, in Powell River, British Columbia) is a Canadian politician. A Registered Professional Forester, he was elected as an opposition Member of Parliament for the Comox Alberni riding in the 1993 election. He was re-elected in the Nanaimo-Alberni constituency in the 1997 election. In both elections he ran as a member of the Reform Party. At the end of his second term, the Reform Party folded into the Canadian Alliance. He did not run in the 2000 general election.

Parliament of Canada
Preceded by Bob Skelly	Members of Parliament from Comox—Alberni; 1993-1997	Succeeded by Riding Ceased to Exist
Preceded by Riding did not exist	Members of Parliament from Nanaimo—Alberni; 1997-2000	Succeeded by James Lunney
