= Hugh Alan Anderson =

Canadian politician

Member of the Canadian Parliament for Comox—Alberni
- In office 1974–1979
- Preceded by: Thomas Speakman Barnett
- Succeeded by: Electoral district was abolished in 1976.

Personal details
- Born: September 25, 1933 Saskatoon, Saskatchewan, Canada
- Died: April 22, 2015 (aged 81) Port Alberni, British Columbia, Canada
- Party: Liberal
- Portfolio: Parliamentary Secretary to the Minister of Indian Affairs and Northern Development (1978-1979); Parliamentary Secretary to the Minister of Fisheries and the Environment (1977-1978)

Hugh Alan Anderson (September 25, 1933 – April 22, 2015) was a Canadian politician.

An insurance broker by trade, Anderson was elected to the House of Commons of Canada in the 1974 federal election representing the riding of Comox—Alberni, British Columbia. The Liberal MP served as Parliamentary Secretary to the Minister of Fisheries and the Environment from 1977 to 1978 and then as Parliamentary Secretary to the Minister of Indian Affairs and Northern Development until the 1979 federal election in which he was defeated.

Anderson remained active in public life, serving since the 1990s as Chair of the Port Alberni Port Authority. He died on April 22, 2015.
