= CHPQ-FM =

Radio station in Parksville, British Columbia

Coordinates: 49°17′39″N 124°19′30″W

- Parksville, British Columbia; Canada
- Broadcast area: Parksville, Qualicum Beach
- Frequency: 99.9 MHz
- Branding: The Lounge 99.9

Programming
- Format: Adult standards/classic hits

Ownership
- Owner: Jim Pattison Group; (Island Radio)

History
- First air date: January 2, 1995 (rebroadcaster of CKWV-FM); February 11, 2005 (separate station)
- Former call signs: CKWV-FM-1 (1995–2005)
- Call sign meaning: Coombs Hilliers Parksville Qualicum Beach

Technical information
- Class: A
- ERP: horizontal polarization only: 1.1 kWs average 2.1 kWs peak
- HAAT: 114 metres (374 ft)

Links
- Webcast: Listen Live
- Website: thelounge999.com

CHPQ-FM (The Lounge 99.9) is a Canadian radio station operating in Parksville, British Columbia at 99.9 FM. Island Radio, a division of the Jim Pattison Group, owns the station.

== History ==
The roots of CHPQ can be traced indirectly back to Parksville's first radio station (now CIBH-FM), which also used the call sign CHPQ (which stood for Coombs, Hilliers, Parksville and Qualicum Beach); that station first went on the air on December 3, 1973 as a semi-satellite of Nanaimo station CHUB (owned by Nanaimo Broadcasting Co.), operating at 1370 AM with 1000 watts of power.

The current station got its start when, in 1994, Benchmark Ventures (which bought CHPQ and CHUB from Nanaimo Broadcasting in 1986) merged with Central Island Broadcasting Ltd. (later Island Radio), and the Canadian Radio-television and Telecommunications Commission (CRTC) granted CHUB permission to move to 102.3 FM (as CKWV) and to place a rebroadcaster in Parksville (CKWV-FM-1) at 99.9 FM. The switch took effect on January 2, 1995.

On January 19, 2005, Central Island Broadcasting changed its corporate name to Island Radio, reflecting its expanded presence on Vancouver Island (with the addition of Courtenay station CKLR-FM and the acquisition of CJAV in Port Alberni). On February 11 that year, Parksville's CKWV-FM-1 ceased rebroadcasting CKWV and became a separate station catering to the residents of Parksville and Qualicum Beach, assuming CIBH's original call sign of CHPQ and broadcasting a combined format of middle of the road and easy listening music. Some station IDs for CHPQ are announced via voice-tracking by late American disc jockey and voice actor Gary Owens. CHPQ has since transitioned to a mixed adult standards/classic hits format.

== The sale to Jim Pattison ==
On November 1, 2005, the Jim Pattison Broadcast Group, a division of the Jim Pattison Group, and Island Radio Ltd. announced that Island Radio had agreed to sell its six radio stations (including CHPQ) to the Jim Pattison Broadcast Group; following CRTC approval, Pattison assumed ownership of the Island Radio stations at midnight on June 30, 2006.
