= James Lunney =

Canadian politician (born 1951)

James D. Lunney

Member of Parliament for Nanaimo—Alberni
- In office November 27, 2000 – August 4, 2015
- Preceded by: Bill Gilmour
- Succeeded by: None—riding abolished (see Nanaimo—Ladysmith)

Personal details
- Born: September 5, 1951 (age 75) Winnipeg, Manitoba, Canada
- Party: Independent
- Other political affiliations: Conservative (2003–2015); Canadian Alliance (2000–2003)
- Spouse: Helen Lunney
- Profession: chiropractor

James D. Lunney (born September 5, 1951) is a Canadian politician. He was the member of Parliament (MP) for Nanaimo—Alberni from 2000 to 2015.

Born in Winnipeg, Manitoba, he received a Bachelor of Science degree from the University of Manitoba in 1972 and a Doctor of Chiropractic from the Canadian Memorial Chiropractic College in Toronto in 1976. He was first elected in 2000 as a Canadian Alliance candidate, then re-elected in 2004, 2006, 2008, and 2011 under the banner of the Conservative Party. He resigned from the Conservative caucus on March 31, 2015, claiming on his blog, "the realm of politics at senior levels" have become hostile to "a Christian world-view", and completed his term in parliament as an independent MP. He had earlier announced that he would not be standing in the 2015 federal election scheduled for the fall as his constituency is being eliminated due to redistribution.

After practicing chiropractic health care in Kitchener, Ontario, for approximately 15 years, the Lunneys relocated to Vancouver Island, where James established West Coast Chiropractic in Parksville and practiced for another 9 years.

== Political career ==
Lunney joined the Canadian Alliance Party shortly before his bid to run in Nanaimo – Alberni in the 2000 federal election for the Canadian Alliance Party. He garnered 50.45 percent of the vote, beating his Liberal opponent, Hira Chopra by 15,639 votes. In the 2004 general election, Lunney won with 39.06 percent of the vote over NDP candidate Scott Fraser. Lunney won again in 2006 with 41 percent of the vote against NDP representative Manjeet Uppal. In 2008, Lunney beat Zeni Maartman by 15 percent of the vote. Lunney beat Maartman again by a margin of 8.1% gaining 46.4 percent of the vote in the 2011 Federal Election.

Lunney voiced his support for motion 312, a motion that would effectively make abortion illegal, saying his stance should "surprise no one". However, the motion was struck down.

== "Dr" Lunney ==
In 2006 Lunney was sued by Robert Pound for the use of the term "Dr" on all campaign signs and promotional materials. Pound stated, "The Chiropractors Act states that chiropractors may display or make use of the title 'doctor' or the abbreviation 'Dr.', but only as 'Doctor of Chiropractic', 'Dr. of Chiropractic', 'Chiropractic Doctor' or 'Chiropractic Dr.'" Pound had previously filed a grievance with the B.C. Chiropractic College, which quickly dismissed the complaint in January 2007. The case went to the BC Supreme Court where the presiding judge, Justice Douglas Halfyard exonerated Lunney ruling that the use of the title "Dr." did not "infringe any legal or equitable right" of the petitioner, Robert Pound. The judge also called the timing of Pound's complaint "suspicious to say the least" –referring to the timing of the petition close to the federal election. Pound was ordered to pay Lunney's legal expenses.

== Bill C-420 ==
On March 20, 2003, Lunney introduced Private Members' Bill C-420, "An act to amend the Food and Drugs Act", in the House of Commons. The bill would have re-classified all natural health products as foods and would have lifted restrictions on health claims that manufacturers can make about their products.

Lunney said in the House of Commons: "Bill C-420 is about releasing the tremendous amount of information that supports the judicious use of natural health products, and it's about greater freedom of choice in personal health care. With a minority government, we have the opportunity to advance effectiveness and cost effectiveness in health care".

Bill C-420 died in the House in 2004 and was reintroduced with the same name by Conservative MP Colin Carrie. On November 22, 2005, the Health Committee voted to not proceed with the second Bill, voting 7–4 to kill it.

== Controversies ==
In April 2009, Lunney made a statement in Parliament suggesting the theory of evolution was not proven, stating, "any scientist who declares that the theory of evolution is a fact has already abandoned the foundations of science." In March 2015, Lunney tweeted "Stop calling evolution fact!"

On June 29, 2010, Lunney called upon Health Canada to tighten controls on "over-prescribed" proton pump inhibitors, which suppress stomach acids but have been shown to increase the likelihood of Clostridioides difficile colitis, an intestinal disease with flu-like symptoms. Lunney said, "It has proven difficult to eradicate but much of its spread and related death toll could be prevented, if patients were made aware of the risks when doctors prescribe PPI medication."

In May 2010, Lunney's travel expenses caused controversy as part of an ongoing debate regarding MP expenses. Lunney spent $169,935 in one year travelling between Nanaimo-Alberni and Ottawa. In his defence, Lunney stated that despite the trip being long, he returns to his riding at "every chance I get" to attend events and meet with constituents. Lunney defended his regular business-class flights, stating that because he works en route he needs the extra space to allow him to work on sometimes confidential material on his laptop. Regarding his wife accompanying him, he stated: "I sometimes also encourage my wife to come along on these trips because I wouldn't have much of a chance to see her if she didn't, but it's allowed according to the rules on spending and she travels in economy class."
