= Richard Durante =

Canadian politician

Richard John Joseph Durante

Member of Parliament for Comox—Alberni
- In office June 1968 – February 1969

Personal details
- Born: 17 August 1930 New Westminster, British Columbia, Canada
- Died: 11 September 2003 (aged 73) Salt Spring Island, British Columbia, Canada
- Party: Liberal
- Profession: supervising principal

Richard John Joseph Durante (17 August 1930 at New Westminster, British Columbia – 11 September 2003) was a Liberal Party member of the House of Commons of Canada. He was a supervising principal by career.

In the 1968 general election, Tom Barnett was initially declared the winner of the Comox—Alberni riding over Durante by a three-vote margin. But the Liberals demanded a recount whose result gave Durante a nine-vote lead, therefore giving Durante the seat in Parliament. However, Barnett and his party's riding association filed a court challenge that concluded on 3 February 1969 when two British Columbia Supreme Court judges ruled that twelve Canadian Forces members had voted despite being ineligible. The result was therefore invalidated. Durante was allowed to remain a member of the House of Commons for one additional week, to allow time for a possible appeal. The Liberals ultimately decided not to challenge the ruling, and Durante's seat was declared vacant.

This led to a by-election on 8 April 1969 which Barnett won against Durante, therefore cutting short the Liberal candidate's career in federal politics.
