= CIBH-FM =

Radio station in Parksville, British Columbia

Coordinates: 49°17′39″N 124°19′30″W

- Parksville, British Columbia; Canada
- Broadcast area: Parksville, Qualicum Beach
- Frequency: 88.5 MHz
- Branding: 88.5 The Beach

Programming
- Format: Adult contemporary

Ownership
- Owner: Jim Pattison Group; (Island Radio)

History
- First air date: December 3, 1973; 52 years ago
- Former call signs: CHPQ (1973–1995); CKCI (1995–2002)
- Former frequencies: 1370 kHz (1973–1995); 1350 AM (1995–2002)
- Call sign meaning: BH for "Beach"

Technical information
- Class: A
- ERP: 960 watts 2,000 watts (maximum)
- HAAT: 109.8 metres (360 ft)

Links
- Webcast: Listen live
- Website: www.885thebeach.com

CIBH-FM (88.5 The Beach) is a Canadian radio station located in Parksville, British Columbia. The station, which operates on 88.5 FM, is owned by Island Radio, a division of the Jim Pattison Group.

== History ==
CIBH first went on the air on December 3, 1973, as CHPQ (which stood for Coombs, Hilliers, Parksvillle and Qualicum Beach), a semi-satellite of Nanaimo station CHUB (owned by Nanaimo Broadcasting Co.), operating on 1370 AM with 1,000 watts of power.

In 1986, Nanaimo Broadcasting sold CHUB and CHPQ to Benchmark Ventures Inc. (headed by Gene Daniels, who became general manager of both stations); by 1992, CHPQ was producing 43 hours of local programming each week, with the rest of its schedule originating at CHUB. In 1994, Benchmark Ventures merged with Central Island Broadcasting Ltd. (later Island Radio), and the Canadian Radio-television and Telecommunications Commission (CRTC) granted CHUB permission to move to 102.3 FM (as CKWV) and to place a rebroadcaster in Parksville (CKWV-FM-1) on 99.9 FM. The switch took effect in early 1995, at which point two other switches took place; Nanaimo station CKEG moved to the old CHUB frequency of 1570, and CHPQ took over CKEG's former frequency on 1350 AM and became CKCI on July 31, increasing its transmission power from 1,000 watts to 10,000. In 1999, CKCI began simulcasting CKEG's oldies format as the two stations took the on-air name Good Time Oldies. On January 14, 2002, CKCI moved to 88.5 FM and became CIBH-FM, adopting its current adult contemporary format.

The CHPQ call sign is now used by the former CKWV rebroadcaster CKWV-FM-1, which began airing a separate schedule on February 11, 2005.

== The sale to Jim Pattison ==
On November 1, 2005, the Jim Pattison Broadcast Group and Island Radio Ltd. announced that Island Radio had agreed to sell its six radio stations (including CIBH) to the Jim Pattison Broadcast Group; following CRTC approval, Pattison assumed ownership of the Island Radio stations at midnight on June 30, 2006.
