= By-elections to the 26th Canadian Parliament =

By-elections to the 26th Canadian Parliament were held to fill vacancies in the House of Commons of Canada between the 1963 federal election and the 1965 federal election. The Liberal Party of Canada led a minority government for the entirety of the 26th Canadian Parliament, with no change from by-elections.

Six vacant seats were filled through by-elections.

By-election	Date	Incumbent	Party	Winner	Party	Cause	Retained
Westmorland	November 9, 1964	Sherwood Rideout	Liberal	Margaret Rideout	Liberal	Death	Yes
Waterloo South	November 9, 1964	Gordon Chaplin	Progressive Conservative	Max Saltsman	New Democratic	Death	No
Nipissing	June 22, 1964	Jack Garland	Liberal	Carl Legault	Liberal	Death	Yes
Saskatoon	June 22, 1964	Henry Frank Jones	Progressive Conservative	Eloise Jones	Progressive Conservative	Death	Yes
Laurier	February 10, 1964	Lionel Chevrier	Liberal	Fernand-E. Leblanc	Liberal	Resignation	Yes
Saint-Denis	February 10, 1964	Azellus Denis	Liberal	Marcel Prud'Homme	Liberal	Resignation	Yes

== See also ==
- List of federal by-elections in Canada

== Sources ==
- Parliament of Canada–Elected in By-Elections
