= CKWX =

Radio station in Vancouver (1923–2026)

- Final CKWX logo from 2024 to 2026.
- Vancouver, British Columbia; Canada
- Broadcast area: Greater Vancouver
- Frequency: 1130 kHz
- Branding: 1130 NewsRadio Vancouver

Programming
- Format: News/talk
- Affiliations: CityNews; CKVU-DT; The Canadian Press; ABC News Radio; Associated Press; Bloomberg Radio

Ownership
- Owner: Rogers Radio; (Rogers Media, Inc.)
- Sister stations: CISL, CJAX-FM, CKKS-FM, CKVU-DT, CHNM-DT

History
- First air date: April 1, 1923
- Last air date: July 7, 2026
- Former call signs: CFDC (1923–1927)
- Former frequencies: 430 metres (1923–1925); 730 kHz (1925–1933); 1010 kHz (1933–1938); 950 kHz (1938–1941); 980 kHz (1941–1957)

Technical information
- Class: A (clear channel)
- Power: 50,000 watts
- Transmitter coordinates: 49.157601°N 123.067024°W
- Repeater: 96.9 CJAX-HD2 (Vancouver)

Links
- Webcast: Listen Live
- Website: vancouver.citynews.ca

CKWX (1130 AM) was a commercial radio station in Vancouver, British Columbia, Canada. Owned by Rogers Radio, a division of Rogers Sports & Media, it broadcast an news/talk radio format branded as 1130 NewsRadio Vancouver. CKWX's studios and offices were located at 2440 Ash Street in the Fairview neighbourhood of Vancouver.

CKWX was a Class A clear-channel station, broadcasting at 50,000 watts. CKWX broadcast with a directional antenna at all times, using a two-tower array. The transmitter was located at Number 6 Road at Blundell Road on Lulu Island in Richmond. CKWX's daytime signal covered Southwest British Columbia and Northwest Washington. At night, CKWX could be heard around Western Canada and the Northwestern United States. CKWX was also heard on the second HD Radio subchannel of CJAX-FM.

== History ==
=== Early years ===
On April 1, 1923, the station first signed on the air. Its original city of licence was Nanaimo, British Columbia, and its call sign was CFDC. It was owned by Arthur "Sparks" Holstead (1890–1971), operator of an automotive battery business. The station broadcast on 430 metres (670 kHz) with 10 watts of power (later increased to 50 watts).

In 1925, the station switched frequencies to 730 kHz and cut its power back to 10 watts to share time with Vancouver stations CFCQ, CKCD, and CJKC.

Holstead had a branch business at 1220 Seymour Street in Vancouver and decided to relocate CFDC there. The station was regularly on the air in its new locale by September 20, 1925, according to the radio listings in the Victoria Daily Colonist. The Department of Marine and Fisheries (which then regulated broadcasting in Canada) had not authorized CFDC's move to Vancouver and revoked the station's licence as a result, but listener complaints led to the department granting a new licence to the station.

By October 1926, the station was broadcasting sponsored programmes for the Hudson's Bay Company. It was on the air daily except Wednesday, from 4:30 to 5:30 p.m. Other advertisers included the Kelly-Douglas Company, Dominion Battery Company, Canadian National Carbon Company and Moorite Products of Canada. H.W. Paulson was the announcer and R. Burgess the sales representative. The station transmitted through an 80-foot-high aerial on 411 metres at 10 watts. The station's final broadcast from Nanaimo appears to have been a special programme on April 1, 1927, which was claimed at the time of having established a world record for the furthest distance of a transmission over a submarine telephone cable. Holstead asked Nanaimo City Council to bear part of the $125 cost of any similar broadcasts because of the publicity to the city.

=== CKWX ===
The station first used the call letters CKWX on August 1, 1927, in conjunction with the opening of its new studios. The official opening wasn't until August 19, and was marked by a four-hour all-star programme, including the band of the H. M. S. Colombo. Other local stations remained off the air as a courtesy. The station was operating from the Hotel Georgia, 801 West Georgia Street, and sharing air time at 411 metres (730 kilocycles) with CFCQ and CKCD, then with CHLS, CKFC and CKMO in 1929. The station was permitted to use a special wave-length of 340.7 metres for a speech by M.P. Henri Bourassa for one occasion in 1927.

Harold William Paulson, who had been a storage battery engineer in the U.S. before coming to British Columbia, left CKWX by 1933 and eventually became commercial manager at the CBC Vancouver.

In 1933, CKWX moved to 1010 kHz, then to 950 kHz in 1938. It moved to 980 kHz in 1941 following the North American Regional Broadcasting Agreement (NARBA), which took effect on March 27 that year to settle problems with AM radio interference. Arthur Halstead later sold a 40% share of the station to Taylor, Pearson & Carson, which took over station management, moved the studios to Seymour Street and increased its transmitting power to 1,000 watts. By 1947, CKWX's power further increased to 5,000 watts and it became a network affiliate of the Mutual Broadcasting System, while its transmitter was moved to Lulu Island (now part of Richmond).

=== Move to 1130 kHz ===
CKWX went to 24-hour operation on January 1, 1954, at 12:30 a.m., with a program called "Concert Under the Stars." In 1956, the studios moved to a new purpose-built building at 1275 Burrard Street, and on August 15, 1957, CKWX switched from 980 kHz (soon taken by CKNW) to its later 1130 kHz frequency. The station adopted a Top 40 music format in the same year when Red Robinson joined the station's on-air staff. CKWX was, in fact, the first Vancouver radio station to use the all-hit format full-time. In 1958, CKWX became the first non-CBC station in Western Canada to operate with 50,000 watts.

Harold Carson, one-third of the Taylor, Pearson & Carson firm that owned CKWX, died in 1959. The firm changed its name to Selkirk Holdings Ltd. later in the year. CKWX switched formats from Top 40 to MOR music with some talk shows in 1962, and Red Robinson left the station at that time to join CFUN. Selkirk became a publicly traded company in 1965, and it purchased 100% ownership of CKWX (with approval from the Board of Broadcast Governors) on October 10, 1966.

=== Country era ===
On March 7, 1973, CKWX underwent a major change as it dropped its mix of MOR music and talk and switched to country, keeping that format for the next 23 years. On February 13, 1979, the CRTC granted CKWX parent Selkirk Holdings a licence for an FM station with a jazz format. Selkirk originally wanted 93.7 MHz, but were advised to find a different frequency. CJAZ would sign on at 92.1 MHz on March 1, 1980, as the first Canadian station playing all jazz. CJAZ later moved to 96.9, then switched call letters and formats in 1985 as it became CKKS, playing adult contemporary music. The 92.1 frequency is now used by CBU-FM-1 in Victoria.

CKWX and CKKS moved to new studios on 2440 Ash Street on June 17, 1988, with the official opening on July 20. On September 28, 1988, Maclean-Hunter Ltd. purchased Selkirk Communications and its stations (including CKWX and CKKS) and also received approval from the CRTC to transfer the former Selkirk stations to Rogers Communications.

=== All-news ===
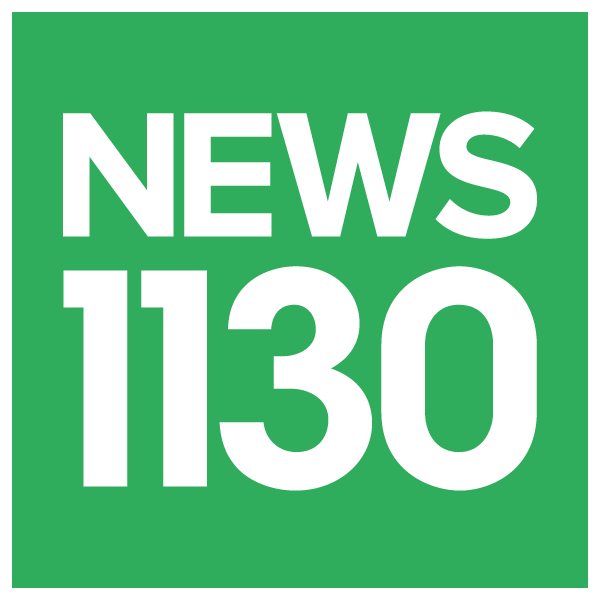
1130 News logo (until 2021)

On February 8, 1996, at 8 a.m., after playing "For the Good Times" by Ray Price, CKWX ended its country music format after almost 23 years and switched to its all-news format as "News 1130". Tom Mark was the first announcer under the new format. Other anchors when the station went on the air were Brian Decker, Dianne Newman, Kevin Rothwell, Andrea Ring, Terri Theodore and Jack Marion, who was also the morning newsman at CKKS. Field reporters included Jim Goddard and Treena Wood, with Garry Raible as sports director, Russell Byth and Herb Hamm as the business editors, and Bruce Williams and Kim Larsson reporting on traffic. Brian Brenn, Ted Schellenberg and Eric Westra joined the station within the first year as anchors, shortly followed by Jim Bennie and veteran Andy Walsh.

In 2003, CKKS switched formats again and became CJAX-FM, playing adult hits under the "Jack FM" branding.

A fairly extensive personnel shuffle took place at CKWX on September 2, 2003. Program Director George Gordon replaced Andrew Dawson as morning co-anchor, joining Kenya Anderson, while Dianne Newman moved to the midday slot joining Brian Brenn. That same day, Jim Bennie joined Joanna Mileos to co-anchor the p.m. drive. In 2006, Don Lehn would rotate in middays with Brian Brenn and Andy Walsh until 2010. Pamela McCall became the newest afternoon anchor, replacing Joanna Mileos, in the Spring of 2007. McCall would later leave the station and be replaced by Karen Thomson in 2008. Following the departure of Kenya Anderson in 2005, Treena Wood and Tammy Moyer alternated in the anchor chair only to be replaced by Dianne Newman in 2006. Ben Wilson was named permanent evening anchor with Tom Bricker in November 2007. That same month, Brian Brenn took early retirement and was replaced in the midday anchor chair by Reaon Ford. George Gordon was terminated July 15, 2009. Reaon Ford was promoted from midday anchor to morning anchor in August 2009.

An editorial commentary segment, titled A Minute with Bill Good was introduced on September 8, 2015, with host Bill Good.

More changes came on Nov. 17, 2020 as six staff members were laid off as part of national cuts, including afternoon anchor Bennie, meterologist Russ LaCate and afternoon editor Bruce Claggett, with John Ackermann moving from mornings to afternoons and Terry Schintz hired to co-host mornings. Bennie returned to the company on March 17, 2026 to host on weekends and other day-parts and remained until the station went off the air.

On June 23, 2016, CKWX began simulcasting on the HD Radio subchannel of sister station CJAX-FM-HD2.

Logo as "CityNews 1130" used from 2021-2024

In June 2021, Rogers announced that it would rebrand CKWX and its other all-news radio stations under the CityNews brand beginning October 18, 2021. The radio station's website was co-branded with CityNews, and included reporting from Citytv Vancouver's newscasts.

In July 2024, CKWX rebranded as “1130 NewsRadio Vancouver.”

=== Closure ===
On July 7, 2026 Rogers announced that CKWX had shut down as one of six radio station closures in various locations across the country, with the licence being returned to the CRTC.

=== Shortwave CKFX ===
For listeners in remote areas of British Columbia and the Yukon, CKWX rebroadcast on a 10-watt shortwave radio transmitter at 6.08 MHz. The licence for CKFX was deleted on June 8, 2007, after an extended silence. The CKFX call letters are now on an FM radio station in North Bay.

The shortwave service had been in operation since 1929 and had been inherited from CKFC. The shortwave outlet was intended to serve coastal communities that had no existing AM service, in particular Haida Gwaii and upper Vancouver Island. A 10-watt transmitter (output power) and new antenna sent the CKFX signal in a north westerly direction. CKFX operated in the 49-metre band at 6.08 MHz.
