= Alberni District Secondary School =

Location
- 4000 Roger Street; Port Alberni, British Columbia, V9Y 0B1; Canada; 49°14′28″N 124°47′35″W

Information
- School type: Academy
- Founded: 1951
- School board: School District 70 Alberni
- Superintendent: Peter Klaver
- Principal: Craig Macaulay
- Grades: 8 - 12
- Language: Canadian English, Canadian French
- Colours: red, white & black
- Team name: Armada Storm
- Website: www.sd70.bc.ca/school/adss/Pages/default.aspx

Alberni District Secondary School (ADSS), formerly known as Alberni District High School (ADHS), is the only secondary school in Port Alberni. It is a part of School District 70 Alberni.

== History ==
ADSS was originally located in 1951 on the site of the former Redford School, but needed to move to the site on Burde Street within a year to accommodate all the new students attending. Although at this time there were 800 students and 32 teachers, approximately half of the students were in grade 7 or 8, with only about 30 students in the graduating class. In 1977, enrollment was around 1300 in grades 11 and 12, with over 400 students in grade 12 alone. Many additions were built onto this second school, including a cafeteria, full vocational training shops, a library and an auditorium. The auditorium seated nearly 1000 and featured a large stage that was the venue for decades of performances, ceremonies and school functions. The 22-acre site boasted multiple sports fields, a running track and tennis courts, and the Gym was home to decades of sporting events, including Totem Tournaments (basketball). In January 1974, the roof was blown off the building and extensive damage was Mr caused failure to the interior. The largest graduating class from ADSS was 1988, at over 460 students.

School District 70 began construction on a new location for ADSS on Roger Street, near the intersection with 10th Avenue, in 2010 to replace the former school building at 4000 Burde Street, which closed at the end of June 2012. The new school building, located at 4000 Roger Street, opened on September 10, 2012.

== Discord Server ==
https://discord.gg/pzWFUMpDJs is the Permanent Link
