= School District 70 Pacific Rim =

Canadian school district

Location
- Bamfield; Port Alberni; Tofino; Ucluelet; Canada

District information
- Superintendent: Peter Klaver
- Schools: 13
- Budget: $58.4 million CAD (2022-2023)

Students and staff
- Students: 4589
- Staff: 500

Other information
- Website: sd70.bc.ca

School District 70 Pacific Rim (formerly School District 70 Alberni) is a school district on the west coast of Vancouver Island in British Columbia. The board office and the majority of the schools are located in Port Alberni but the district extends to the west to include Ucluelet, Tofino, and Bamfield.

At the request of the Board of School Trustees, the name of the district was changed from School District 70 Alberni to School District 70 Pacific Rim by the province of British Columbia through an Order-in-Council on September 20, 2020.

The current Superintendent of the Pacific Rim School District is Peter Klaver.

== Schools ==
School	Location	Grades	Notes
Alberni District Secondary School	Port Alberni	8-12	
Bamfield Community School	Bamfield	K-12	
École Alberni Elementary	Port Alberni	K-7	
Eighth Avenue Learning Centre	Port Alberni	K-12	
EJ Dunn Elementary School	Port Alberni	K-7	
John Howitt Elementary School	Port Alberni	K-7	
Maquinna Elementary School	Port Alberni	K-7	This school is named for Maquinna, the powerful Mowachaht Nuu-chah-nulth chief during the peak of the maritime fur trade in the 1780s and 1790s.
Pacific Rim International Student Program	Port Alberni	K-12	
Tsuma-as Elementary School	Port Alberni	K-7	
Ucluelet Elementary School	Ucluelet	K-7	
Ucluelet Secondary School	Ucluelet	8-12	
Wickaninnish Community School	Tofino	K-7	Wickaninnish was a chief of the Tla-o-qui-aht people of Clayoquot Sound in the 1780s and 1790s.
Wood Elementary School	Port Alberni	K-7	

== Board of Education ==
The district is governed by the school board, which consists of six school trustees elected from the Alberni Valley region, and one from the West Coast region. Elections are held every four years. The most recent election was on October 15, 2022. The next scheduled election will be October 17, 2026.

Member	Votes
Janis Joseph	3,937
Craig Pam	2,888
Christine Washington	2,501
Larry Ransom	2,402
Cherilyn Bray	2,262
Helen Zanette	2,001
Cynthia Orr	acclaimed

== School Buses ==
| 2 2004 Blue Bird All American Gen 4 | 2 2005 IC RE | 2 2004 Blue Bird Vision wheelchair | 1 2026 Blue bird All American Gen 6 wheelchair | 1 2020 Blue Bird All American Gen 6 | 1 2019 Blue Bird All American Gen 6 | 1 2013 Blue Bird All American Gen 5 | 1 2014 Blue Bird All American Gen 6 | 2 2010 Thomas Built Buses Saf-T-Liner HDX | 2 2026 IC CE

== See also ==
- List of school districts in British Columbia
