= Ted Schellenberg =

Canadian politician

Ted William Schellenberg (born 11 August 1952) is a Canadian broadcaster (CKEG, CKWX)and former politician. Schellenberg served as a Progressive Conservative party member of the House of Commons of Canada.

Born in Dauphin, Manitoba, Schellenberg was elected at the Nanaimo—Alberni electoral district in the 1984 federal election, thus he served in the 33rd Canadian Parliament. In the 1988 federal election, his riding became Nanaimo—Cowichan and he was defeated by David Stupich of the New Democratic Party.

Schellenberg now works as an overnight anchor at News1130 radio in Vancouver.
