= Thomas Speakman Barnett =

Canadian politician

Thomas Speakman "Tom" Barnett
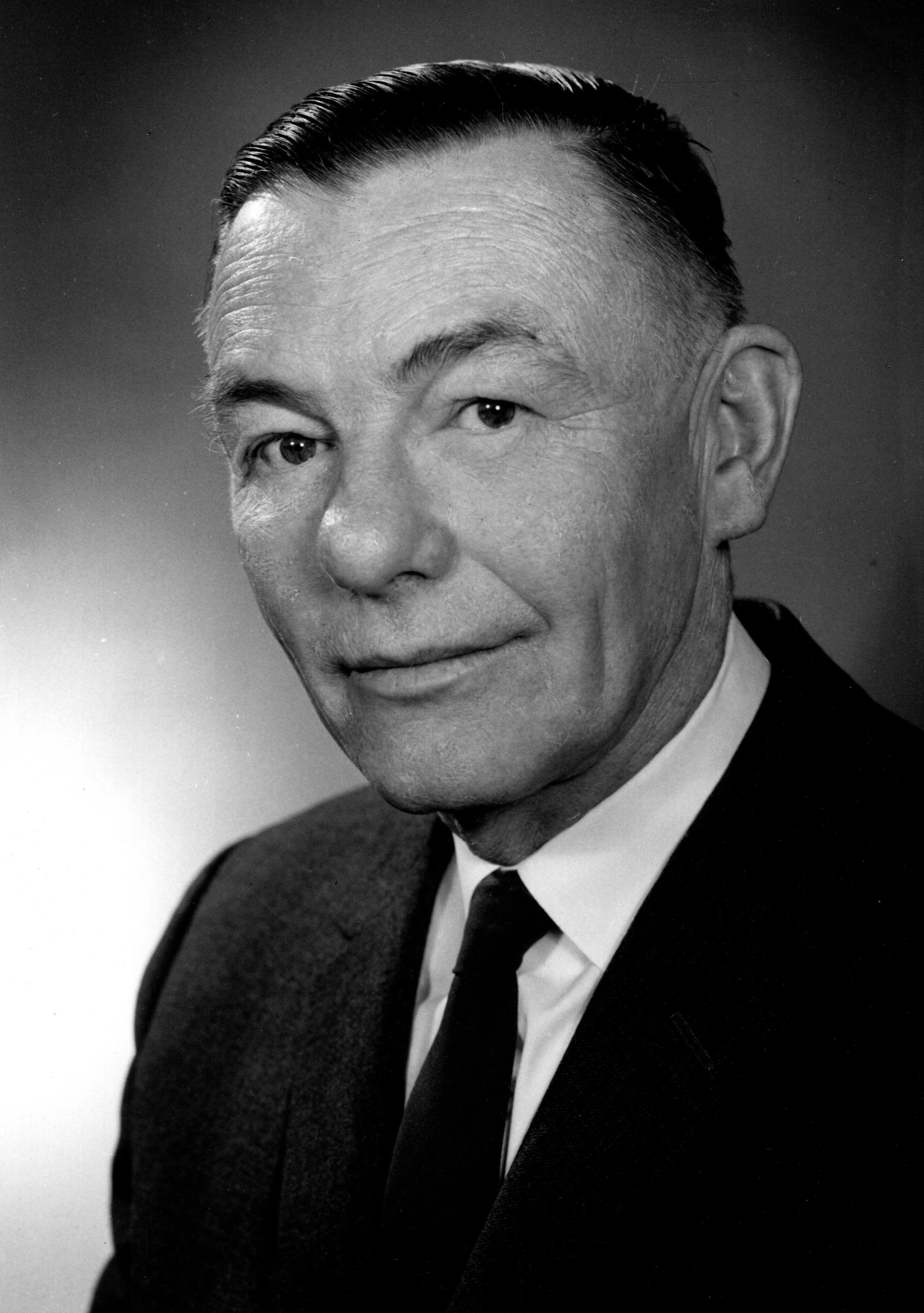
- Born: September 3, 1909; Red Deer, Alberta
- Died: June 5, 2003 (aged 93)
- Education: University of British Columbia
- Spouse: Ruth Evelyn Pidcock

Thomas Speakman Barnett (September 3, 1909 – June 5, 2003) was a politician born in Red Deer, Alberta, Canada. He attended schools in Alberta and British Columbia, and earned a degree at the University of British Columbia. He married Ruth Evelyn Pidcock on July 1, 1942. He worked in saw mills, as editor of the Wells Chronicle (Wells, BC), and was active in trade union affairs.

Barnett was a member of the United Church of Canada. He did missionary work as a student. Barnett was manager of the Alberni and District Co-op, the first employee of the Alberni and District Credit Union and a long-serving executive member of the Industrial, Wood and Allied Workers of Canada (IWA), Local 1-85.

In the 1930s he served as a school trustee in Wells, BC. He also served as an alderman in the former Alberni, British Columbia, (now part of Port Alberni) from 1959 until 1962. After retiring from Federal politics he served as Mayor of the District of Campbell River from 1976 to 1980.

In his first foray into federal politics he was defeated as the Co-operative Commonwealth Federation (CCF) candidate for the House of Commons of Canada in the riding of Comox—Alberni in the 1945 federal election. He was elected from that riding in the 1953 election. He then won re-election in the 1957 election, was defeated in the 1958 election.

The CCF was almost wiped out in 1958 and soon reformed itself as the New Democratic Party (NDP). Barnett won re-election again in the 1962 election, becoming an NDP Member of Parliament, and was re-elected until his defeat in the 1968 election when he was defeated by Liberal Party candidate Richard Durante. The results were voided, however, and Barnett defeated Durante in a 1969 by-election. Barnett won his final House of Commons election in the 1972 election, and retired two years later.
