= CKLR-FM =

Radio station in Courtenay, British Columbia

Coordinates: 49°44′51″N 125°13′56″W

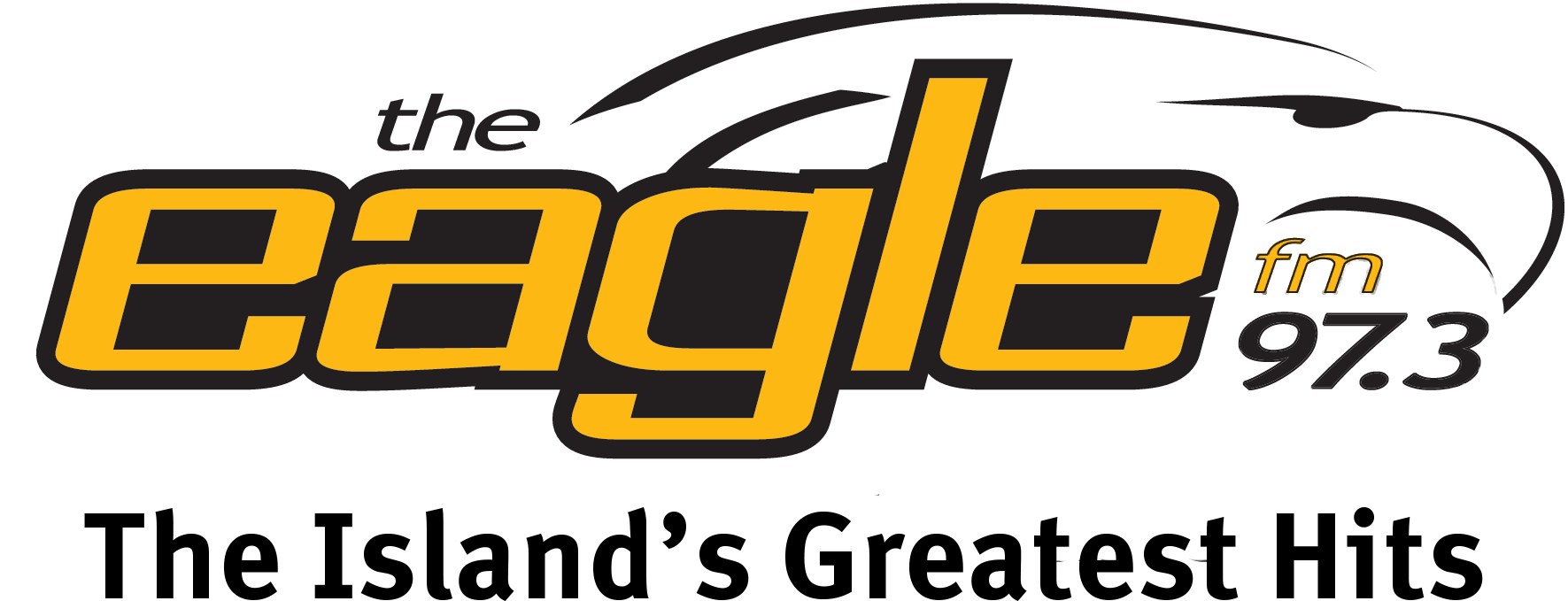
- Courtenay, British Columbia; Canada
- Frequency: 97.3 MHz
- Branding: 97.3 The Eagle

Programming
- Format: Hot adult contemporary/classic hits

Ownership
- Owner: Island Radio (division of the Jim Pattison Group)

History
- First air date: October 5, 1998

Technical information
- Licensing authority: CRTC
- Class: B
- ERP: 4.7 kW average 11.6 kW peak horizontal polarization only
- HAAT: 282 metres (925 ft)

Links
- Webcast: Listen live
- Website: 973theeagle.com

CKLR-FM is a Canadian radio station broadcasting at 97.3 FM in Courtenay, British Columbia, Canada. The station uses its on-air branding 97.3 The Eagle and currently broadcasts a hot adult contemporary format. The station also broadcasts on cable at 89.7 and streams live from their website. The station is owned & operated by Jim Pattison Group and is part of a division of Island Radio.

== History ==
The station received approval by the CRTC on April 21, 1998, and began its on-air broadcasting on October 5, of that same year the first voice being heard on this station was Bill Nation with the morning news. Bill Nation is the only current staff member who was also with the station when it first went to air in 1998.

On November 1, 2005, Pattison and Island Radio announced that Island Radio Ltd. of Nanaimo, B.C. had agreed to sell its six radio stations (and related assets) to the Jim Pattison Broadcast Group. The stations involved in the transaction include CKLR, CKWV and CHWF in Nanaimo, CIBH and CHPQ in Parksville-Qualicum Beach and CJAV in Port Alberni.
