= By-elections to the 31st Canadian Parliament =

By-elections to the 31st Canadian Parliament were held to fill vacancies in the House of Commons of Canada between the 1979 federal election and the 1980 federal election. The Progressive Conservative Party of Canada led a minority government for the entirety of the 31st Canadian Parliament.

Two seats became vacant during the 67-day Parliament, both were filled through by-elections.

By-election	Date	Incumbent	Party	Winner	Party	Cause	Retained
Prince Albert	November 19, 1979	John Diefenbaker	Progressive Conservative	Stan Hovdebo	New Democratic	Death (heart attack)	No
Burin—St. George's	September 19, 1979	Don Jamieson	Liberal	Roger Simmons	Liberal	Resignation	Yes

== See also ==
- List of federal by-elections in Canada

== Sources ==
- Parliament of Canada–Elected in By-Elections
