= Leonard Johnson =

Leonard Johnson or Len Johnson may refer to:

== Sports ==
=== Gridiron football ===
- Leonard Johnson (defensive back, born 1990), American football player in the US
- Leonard Johnson (defensive back, born 1998), American football player in the US and Canada
- Len Johnson (American football) (born 1946), American football center

=== Other sports ===
- Leonard Johnson (baseball), American baseball player
- Len Johnson (boxer) (1902–1974), professional boxer of the 1920s and 1930s
- Len Johnson (cricketer) (1919–1977), Australian cricketer
- Len Johnson (footballer) (1908–1942), Australian rules footballer

== Others ==
- Leonard V. Johnson, Canadian politician
- Leonard G. Johnson (born 1953), American inventor and entrepreneur

== See also ==
- Ernest Leonard Johnson (died c. 1977), South African astronomer
