= Libertarian Party of Canada candidates in the 2011 Canadian federal election =

This is a list of the candidates who ran for the Libertarian Party of Canada in the 41st Canadian federal election.

== British Columbia ==
Riding	Candidate's Name	Notes	Gender	Residence	Occupation	Votes	%	Rank
Burnaby—Douglas	Lewis Clarke Dahlby		Male			420	0.86	5/7
Burnaby—New Westminster	Tyler Pierce		Male			160	0.36	5/6
Delta—Richmond East	Jeff Monds		Male			147	0.31	6/6
Fleetwood—Port Kells	Alex Joehl		Male			370	0.73	5/5
Port Moody—Westwood—Port Coquitlam	Paul Geddes		Male			421	0.87	5/5
Surrey North	Norris Barens		Male			284	0.77	7/7
Vancouver Centre	John Clarke		Male			313	0.53	5/8
Vancouver Kingsway	Matt Kadioglu		Male			275	0.59	5/7
West Vancouver—Sunshine Coast—Sea to Sky Country	Tunya Audain					250	0.40	6/9

== Ontario ==
Riding	Candidate's Name	Notes	Gender	Residence	Occupation	Votes	%	Rank
Ancaster—Dundas—Flamborough—Westdale	Anthony Giles		Male			170	0.29	5/6
Barrie	Darren Roskam		Male			150	0.26	5/7
Durham	Blaize Barnicoat		Female			187	0.32	6/6
Etobicoke North	Alex Dvornyak		Male			208	0.64	4/6
Glengarry—Prescott—Russell	Jean-Serge Brisson		Male			194	0.34	5/5
Guelph	Philip Bender		Male			192	0.33	5/8
Hamilton East—Stoney Creek	Greg Pattinson		Male			385	0.79	6/9
Markham—Unionville	Allen Small		Male			231	0.46	5/5
Oshawa	Matthew Belanger		Male			260	0.51	5/6
St. Paul's	John Kittredge		Male			303	0.55	5/5
Stormont—Dundas—South Glengarry	Darcy Neal Donnelly		Male			151	0.32	5/5
Toronto Centre	Judi Falardeau		Female			277	0.50	5/8
Trinity—Spadina	Chester Brown		Male		Cartoonist	456	0.70	5/6
Whitby—Oshawa	Josh Insang		Male			198	0.31	5/5

== See also ==
- Results of the Canadian federal election, 2011
- Libertarian Party of Canada candidates, 2008 Canadian federal election
