= Leslie Thoms =

Canadian politician

MHA for Grand Bank
- In office 1979–1982
- Preceded by: Alex Hickman
- Succeeded by: Bill Matthews

Personal details
- Born: Leslie Russell Thoms; March 7, 1938 Garnish, Newfoundland, Canada
- Died: December 5, 1999 (aged 61) St. John's, Newfoundland, Canada
- Party: Liberal
- Occupation: lawyer

Leslie Russell Thoms (March 7, 1938 - December 5, 1999) was a Canadian politician, who represented the electoral district of Grand Bank in the Newfoundland House of Assembly from 1979 to 1982. He was a member of the Liberal Party.

The son of James Ernest Thoms and Gertrude Helen Bridger, he was born in Garnish and was educated in Middle Brook. Leslie was one of eight children including Paul Thoms, who also spent time in the House of Assembly.

Prior to his election to the legislature, Thoms had been a supporter of Bill Rowe's 1977 campaign for the Liberal leadership, although Rowe stepped aside in favour of Don Jamieson by the time of the 1979 Newfoundland general election. Thoms was elected to the legislature in that election. Due to the Liberal Party's loss, Jamieson stepped down as leader following the election and Thoms ran as a candidate in the resulting leadership convention, but ultimately lost to Len Stirling.

Thoms was defeated in the 1982 Newfoundland and Labrador general election by Bill Matthews of the Progressive Conservatives.

He subsequently worked as a staff lawyer in the provincial Ministry of Justice.

He died on December 5, 1999, in St. John's.

== Electoral record ==
1979 Newfoundland and Labrador general election
Party	Candidate	Votes	%	±%
Liberal	Leslie Thoms	3,431	65.0	
Progressive Conservative	Clarence Rogers	1,646	31.2	–
NDP	Harvey Tulk Jr.	198	3.8	

1982 Newfoundland and Labrador general election
Party	Candidate	Votes	%	±%
Progressive Conservative	Bill Matthews	2,857	51.6	–
Liberal	Leslie Thoms	2,442	44.1	
NDP	Eric Miller	234	4.23	
