= Grand Bank (electoral district) =

Former provincial electoral district in Newfoundland and Labrador, Canada

Newfoundland and Labrador electoral district
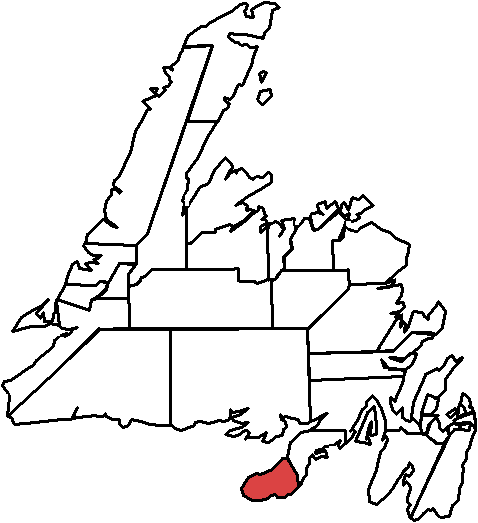

Defunct provincial electoral district
- Legislature: Newfoundland and Labrador House of Assembly
- District created: 1966
- Last contested: 2011

Demographics
- Population (2006): 10,060

Grand Bank is a defunct provincial electoral district for the House of Assembly of Newfoundland and Labrador, Canada. Prior to the 1974 redistribution, the district was called Burin. The district was abolished in 2015 and replaced by Burin-Grand Bank.

Grand Bank covers the southernmost part of the Burin Peninsula. The fishery, particularly deep-sea activity, has historically driven the economy of towns like Grand Bank, Fortune and Lawn. Mining was once prominent in St. Lawrence area, but no longer. Other communities include: Epworth, Frenchman's Cove, Grand Beach, Garnish, L'Anse au Loup, Lamaline, Lewin's Cove, Little St. Lawrence, Lord's Cove, Point au Gaul, Point May, St. Lawrence, Salmonier, Taylor's Bay, Tides Brook, and Winterland.

== Members of the House of Assembly ==
The district has elected the following members of the House of Assembly:

Assembly	Years	Member	Party
29th	1949–1951	Phillip Forsey	Liberal
30th	1951–1956	Phillip Forsey	Liberal
31st	1956–1959	Eric Jones	Liberal
32nd	1959–1962	Eric Jones	Liberal
33rd	1962–1966	Eric Jones	Liberal
34th	1966–1971	Alex Hickman	Progressive Conservative
35th	1971–1972	Alex Hickman	Progressive Conservative
36th	1972–1975	Alex Hickman	Progressive Conservative
37th	1975–1979	Alex Hickman	Progressive Conservative
38th	1979–1982	Leslie Thoms	Liberal
39th	1982–1985	Bill Matthews	Progressive Conservative
40th	1985–1989	Bill Matthews	Progressive Conservative
41st	1989–1993	Bill Matthews	Progressive Conservative
42nd	1993–1996	Bill Matthews	Progressive Conservative
43rd	1996–1999	Judy Foote	Liberal
43rd	1999–2003	Judy Foote	Liberal
44th	2003–2007	Judy Foote	Liberal
45th	2007–2011	Darin King	Progressive Conservative
46th	2011–2015	Darin King	Progressive Conservative

== Election results ==
2011 Newfoundland and Labrador general election
Party	Candidate	Votes	%	±%
Progressive Conservative	Darin King	3,271	68.52	−11.51
Liberal	Carol Anne Haley	1,336	27.98	+8.01
New Democratic	Wally Layman	167	3.5	+3.5

2007 Newfoundland and Labrador general election
Party	Candidate	Votes	%	±%
Progressive Conservative	Darin King	3563	80.03%	+31.5
Liberal	Rod Cake	889	19.97%	-29.35

2003 Newfoundland and Labrador general election
Party	Candidate	Votes	%	±%
Liberal	Judy Foote	3101	49.32%	-20.86
Progressive Conservative	Darin King	3058	48.53%	+28.24
NDP	Bill Wakeley	136	2.15%	-7.37

1999 Newfoundland and Labrador general election
Party	Candidate	Votes	%	±%
Liberal	Judy Foote	3964	70.18	
Progressive Conservative	John Bolt	1146	20.29	–
NDP	Richard Rennie	538	9.52	

1996 Newfoundland and Labrador general election
Party	Candidate	Votes	%	±%
Liberal	Judy Foote	4136	62.13	
Progressive Conservative	Herb Edwards	2521	37.87	–

1993 Newfoundland and Labrador general election
Party	Candidate	Votes	%	±%
Progressive Conservative	Bill Matthews	3406	53.29	–
Liberal	Judy Foote	2805	43.88	
NDP	Joseph L. Edwards	181	2.83	

1989 Newfoundland and Labrador general election
Party	Candidate	Votes	%	±%
Progressive Conservative	Bill Matthews	3948	68.6	–
Liberal	Graham Wood	1811	31.5	

1985 Newfoundland and Labrador general election
Party	Candidate	Votes	%	±%
Progressive Conservative	Bill Matthews	3028	49.3	–
Liberal	T. Maxwell Snook	2689	43.7	
NDP	Calvin Peach	431	7.0	

1982 Newfoundland and Labrador general election
Party	Candidate	Votes	%	±%
Progressive Conservative	Bill Matthews	2857	51.6	–
Liberal	Leslie Thoms	2442	44.1	
NDP	Eric Miller	234	4.23	

1979 Newfoundland and Labrador general election
Party	Candidate	Votes	%	±%
Liberal	Leslie Thoms	3431	65.0	
Progressive Conservative	Clarence Rogers	1646	31.2	–
NDP	Harvey Tulk Jr.	198	3.8	

== See also ==
- List of Newfoundland and Labrador provincial electoral districts
- Canadian provincial electoral districts
