= Larry Edwards =

Larry Edwards may refer to:

- Lawrence Edwards (1919–2009), American aerospace engineer
- Larry Edwards (American football) (born 1984), American football linebacker
- Larry Edwards (cricketer) (born 1995), cricketer for the Windward Islands
- Larry Edwards (entertainer)
- Larry Edwards, 1995 Ontario provincial election candidate
- Richard Lawrence Edwards, American geochemist
