= 1988 Canadian federal election =

- November 21, 1988

295 seats in the House of Commons 148 seats needed for a majority
- Opinion polls
- Turnout: 75.3%
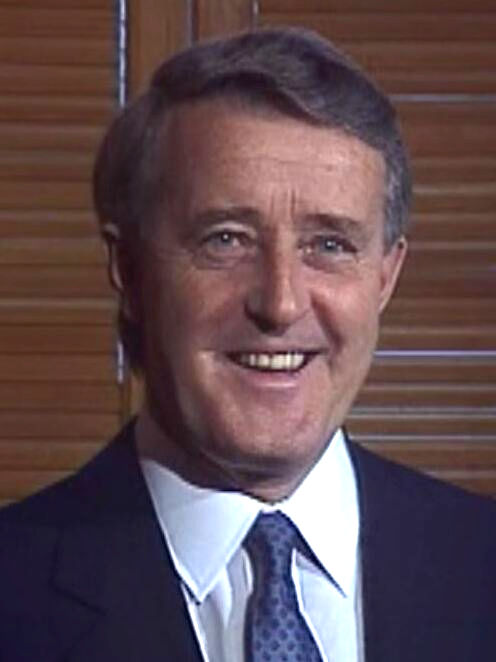

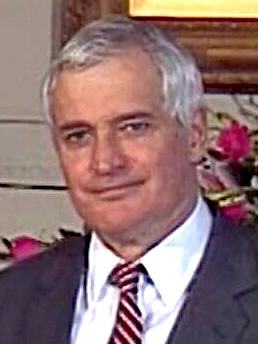

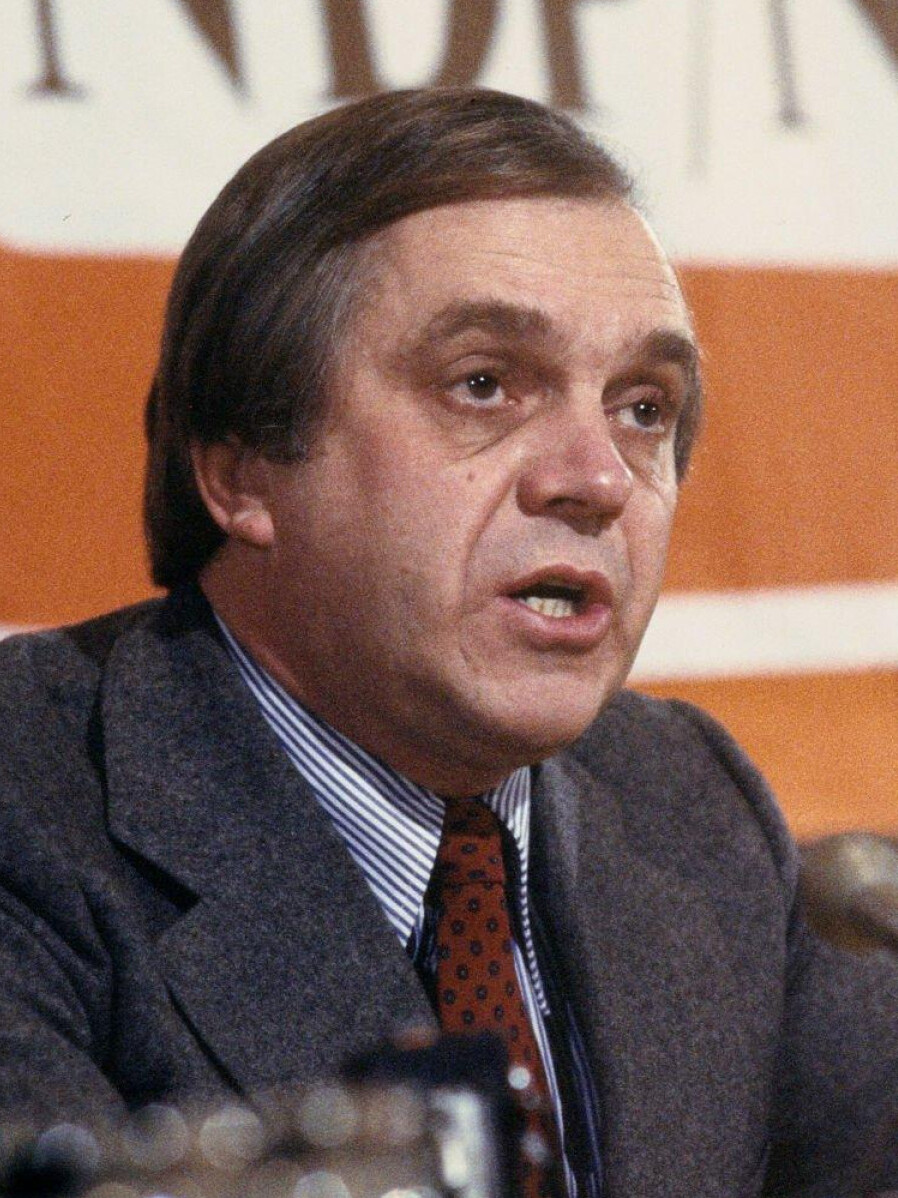
	First party	Second party	Third party
Leader	Brian Mulroney	John Turner	Ed Broadbent
Party	Progressive Conservative	Liberal	New Democratic
Leader since	June 11, 1983	June 16, 1984	July 7, 1975
Leader's seat	Charlevoix	Vancouver Quadra	Oshawa
Last election	211 seats, 50.03%	40 seats, 28.02%	30 seats, 18.81%
Seats before	203	38	32
Seats won	169 (Note: Includes Beaver River MP John Dahmer, who died five days after the election, before being sworn in, with the seat being lost in the subsequent by-election.)	83	43
Seat change	▼34	▲45	▲11
Popular vote	5,667,543	4,205,072	2,685,263
Percentage	43.02%	31.92%	20.38%
Swing	▼7.01 pp	▲3.89 pp	▲1.57 pp

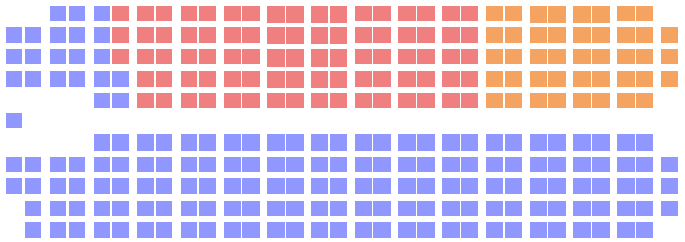
- The Canadian parliament after the 1988 election
Prime Minister before election
Brian Mulroney
Progressive Conservative
Prime Minister after election
Brian Mulroney
Progressive Conservative

The 1988 Canadian federal election was held on November 21, 1988, to elect members to the House of Commons of Canada of the 34th Parliament of Canada following the dissolution of the House on October 1. It was an election largely fought on a single issue, the Canada–United States Free Trade Agreement (CUSFTA); the Progressive Conservative Party campaigned in favour of it, whereas the Liberal Party and the New Democratic Party (NDP) campaigned against it.

The incumbent Progressive Conservative Party, led by Brian Mulroney, was reelected with a second majority government, although based on less than half the votes cast. Mulroney was the party's first leader since John A. Macdonald to win a second consecutive majority government. (Note: Conservative Prime Minister Robert Borden won two majority governments, but the second majority he won in 1917 was when he was leader of the Unionist Party, a party composed of pro-conscription Conservatives and Liberals.) Additionally, this election was the last election in which the Progressive Conservatives would poll over 40 per cent of the vote, as this would not recur until 2025, under the banner of the Conservative Party of Canada.

The Liberal Party experienced a recovery after its 1984 wipeout, more than doubling its seat count. The New Democratic Party won its largest number of seats up to the time (they would beat the 1988 record in 2011). The election was the last won by the Progressive Conservatives, the last until 2011 in which a right-of-centre party formed a majority government, and the most recent where a right-of-centre party won the most seats in Quebec during a federal election. It is also the most recent election in which only three parties were elected to Parliament. With Mulroney winning a majority, the agreement was passed into law, even though a majority of the voters had voted for parties opposing free trade.

== Background ==
Brian Mulroney led the Progressive Conservative Party to a landslide majority government victory in the 1984 federal election. In subsequent years, scandals and patronage damaged his polling numbers. However, in his fourth year in office in 1988, his popularity began to recover; a poll a few days before the election call showed the Progressive Conservatives ahead of the Liberal Party and New Democratic Party.

The Liberal Party led by John Turner suffered a heavy defeat in the 1984 election. Despite this, Turner stayed on as leader and was preparing to campaign for the second election. However, the Liberal Party was in financial and political disarray; by 1986 the party was heavily in debt. Turner's office experienced significant staff turnover, and some former aides were willing to recount stories of the office's disfunction to the press, resulting in one journalist referring to Turner's leadership as a "reign of error". Some pundits believed the Liberals would permanently drop to third place.

In 1987, Mulroney reached an agreement on free trade with the United States. Turner's Liberal Party and Ed Broadbent's New Democratic Party opposed the agreement; Turner believed that the agreement would Americanize Canada. Mulroney used his large majority to pass the bill through the House of Commons; however, the Liberal-dominated Senate demanded an election before they would pass it. The election was called on October 1.

== Campaign ==
The Liberals had some early struggles, notably during one day in Montreal where three different costs were given for the proposed Liberal daycare program. When asked by reporters about the incident, Turner's chief of staff responded using vulgar language. The campaign was also hampered by a Canadian Broadcasting Corporation (CBC) report that stated there was a movement in the backroom to replace Turner with Jean Chrétien, even though Turner had passed a leadership review in 1986 with 76.3 per cent of delegates rejecting a leadership convention.

Turner strongly campaigned against free trade, arguing that it would cost many Canadian jobs. His October 24 and 25 debate performances led to growing Liberal support, with polls suggesting a Liberal government; a week after the debate, the Liberals were six points ahead of the PCs. The Liberal surge prompted the PCs to stop the relatively calm campaign they had been running and instead run a more negative campaign, capitalizing on the perceived lack of public confidence in Turner and his perceived inability to lead the Liberal Party, arguing that he only opposed free trade because of political opportunism. The PCs' poll numbers started to rebound.

== Opinion polling ==
Graph of opinion polls conducted

== National results ==
The Progressive Conservatives won a reduced but strong majority government with 169 seats, and the free trade agreement would go into effect on January 1, 1989. Mulroney was the first Conservative prime minister since John A. Macdonald to win more than one majority. In an ironic reversal of most prior federal elections, the PCs owed their majority to their success in Quebec, where they achieved the best result in party history by winning 63 of 75 seats.

Despite the Liberals more than doubling their seat count from 38 to 83, the results were considered a disappointment for Turner, after polls in mid-campaign predicted a Liberal victory. This second election loss sealed Turner's fate; he would resign in 1990 and was succeeded by Jean Chrétien, who proved to be a more effective leader and when in government, accepted free trade with the United States and did not overturn CUSFTA.

Despite the New Democratic Party enjoying their best result at the time (winning 43 seats), Ed Broadbent resigned as leader in 1989. Some NDP members were disappointed by the fact that they did not become the Official Opposition.

Party	Party leader	# of candidates	Seats				Popular vote		
Party	Party leader	# of candidates	1984	Dissol.	Elected	% change	#	%	Change
Progressive Conservative	Brian Mulroney	295	211	203	169	-19.9%	5,667,543	43.02%	-7.02pp
Liberal	John Turner	294	40	38	83	+107.5%	4,205,072	31.92%	+3.89pp
New Democratic Party	Ed Broadbent	295	30	32	43	+34.4%	2,685,263	20.38%	+1.57pp
Reform	Preston Manning	72	*	-	-	*	275,767	2.09%	*
Christian Heritage	Ed Vanwoudenberg	63	*	-	-	*	102,533	0.78%	*
Rhinoceros	Cornelius the First	74	-	-	-	-	52,173	0.40%	-0.39pp
Green	Seymour Trieger	68	-	-	-	-	47,228	0.36%	+0.14pp
Confederation of Regions	Elmer Knutson	51	-	-	-	-	41,342	0.31%	-0.68pp
Libertarian	Dennis Corrigan	88	-	-	-	-	33,135	0.25%	+0.06pp
No affiliation		100	-	-	-		24,516	0.19%	-0.12pp
Independent		55	1	4	-	-	22,982	0.17%	-0.01pp
Commonwealth of Canada	Gilles Gervais	58	-	-	-	-	7,467	0.06%	-0.21pp
Communist	George Hewison	51	-	-	-	-	7,066	0.05%	-0.01pp
Social Credit	Harvey Lainson	9	-	-	-	-	3,407	0.03%	-0.10pp
Vacant				5					
Total		1,573	282	282	295	+4.6%	13,175,494	100%	

Note:

"% change" refers to change from previous election

== Vote and seat summaries ==
Ternary plots - shift of electoral support (1984-1988)
1984

1988
Electoral districts identified by colours of winning parties

Popular vote
PC	43.02%
Liberal	31.92%
NDP	20.38%
Reform	2.09%
Others	2.59%

Seat totals
PC	57.29%
Liberal	28.14%
NDP	14.58%

A number of unregistered parties also contested the election. The Western Canada Concept party, led by Doug Christie, fielded three candidates in British Columbia. The Western Independence Party ran one candidate in British Columbia, seven in Alberta, and three in Manitoba (although one of the Manitoba candidates appears to have withdrawn before election day).

The Liberal candidate in Etobicoke-Lakeshore, Emmanuel Feuerwerker, withdrew from the race, resulting in the Liberals not running a candidate in all 295 ridings during this election.

The Marxist–Leninist Party fielded candidates in several ridings.

The moribund Social Credit Party fielded nine candidates, far short of the 50 required for official recognition. However, the Chief Electoral Officer allowed the party's name to appear on the ballot by virtue of its half-century history as a recognized party. It would be the last time that the party, which had been the third-largest in Canada at its height, would fight an election under its own name. The party was deregistered before the 1993 election after it failed to nominate enough candidates to keep its registration.

== Seats which changed hands ==
=== Defeated MPs ===
Extended content

Party	Riding	MP	First elected	Defeated by	Party
█ Progressive Conservative	Burin—St. George's	Joe Price	1984	Roger Simmons	█ Liberal
█ Progressive Conservative	Cardigan	Pat Binns	1984	Lawrence MacAulay	█ Liberal
█ Progressive Conservative	Charlottetown	Thomas McMillan	1979	George Proud	█ Liberal
█ Progressive Conservative	Cape Breton Highlands—Canso	Lawrence O'Neil	1984	Francis LeBlanc	█ Liberal
█ Progressive Conservative	Dartmouth	Michael Forrestall	1965	Ron MacDonald	█ Liberal
█ Progressive Conservative	Halifax	Stewart McInnes	1984	Mary Clancy	█ Liberal
█ Progressive Conservative	South West Nova	Gerald Comeau	1984	Coline Campbell	█ Liberal
█ Progressive Conservative	Miramichi	Bud Jardine	1984	Maurice Dionne	█ Liberal
█ Progressive Conservative	Moncton	Dennis Cochrane	1984	George Rideout	█ Liberal
█ Progressive Conservative	Restigouche—Chaleur	Al Girard	1984	Guy Arseneault	█ Liberal
█ Progressive Conservative	Gatineau—La Lièvre	Claudy Mailly	1984	Mark Assad	█ Liberal
█ Progressive Conservative	Lasalle (contested LaSalle—Émard)	Claude Lanthier	1984	Paul Martin	█ Liberal
█ Progressive Conservative	Charlevoix (contested Laurier—Sainte-Marie)	Charles Hamelin	1984	Jean-Claude Malepart	█ Liberal
█ Progressive Conservative	Essex-Kent	James Eber Caldwell	1984	Jerry Pickard	█ Liberal
█ Progressive Conservative	Etobicoke North	Bob Pennock	1984	Roy MacLaren	█ Liberal
█ Progressive Conservative	Haldimand—Norfolk	Bud Bradley	1979	Bob Speller	█ Liberal
█ Progressive Conservative	Hamilton West	Peter Peterson	1984	Stan Keyes	█ Liberal
█ Progressive Conservative	Kent	Elliott Hardey	1984	Rex Crawford	█ Liberal
█ Progressive Conservative	Kingston and the Islands	Flora MacDonald	1972	Peter Milliken	█ Liberal
█ Progressive Conservative	Lambton—Middlesex	Sidney Fraleigh	1984	Ralph Ferguson	█ Liberal
█ Progressive Conservative	Leeds—Grenville	Jennifer Cossitt	1982 by-election	Jim Jordan	█ Liberal
█ Progressive Conservative	London East	Jim Jepson	1984	Joe Fontana	█ Liberal
█ Progressive Conservative	Nepean—Carleton (contested Nepean)	William Tupper	1984	Beryl Gaffney	█ Liberal
█ Progressive Conservative	Nipissing	Moe Mantha Sr.	1984	Bob Wood	█ Liberal
█ Progressive Conservative	Ottawa—Carleton (contested Ottawa South)	Barry Turner	1984	John Manley	█ Liberal
█ Progressive Conservative	Ottawa West	David Daubney	1984	Marlene Catterall	█ Liberal
█ Progressive Conservative	Parkdale—High Park	Andrew Witer	1984	Jesse Flis	█ Liberal
█ Progressive Conservative	Sault Ste. Marie	Jim Kelleher	1984	Steve Butland	█ New Democratic
█ Progressive Conservative	Scarborough West	Reg Stackhouse	1984	Tom Wappel	█ Liberal
█ Progressive Conservative	York—Scarborough (contested Scarborough—Agincourt)	Paul McCrossan	1984	Jim Karygiannis	█ Liberal
█ Progressive Conservative	Timmins—Chapleau	Aurèle Gervais	1984	Cid Samson	█ New Democratic
█ Progressive Conservative	Welland (contested Welland—St. Catharines—Thorold)	Allan Pietz	1984	Gilbert Parent	█ Liberal
█ Progressive Conservative	Willowdale	John Oostrom	1984	Jim Peterson	█ Liberal
█ Progressive Conservative	Saint Boniface	Léo Duguay	1984	Ron Duhamel	█ Liberal
█ Progressive Conservative	Mackenzie	Jack Scowen	1984	Vic Althouse	█ New Democratic
█ Progressive Conservative	Saskatoon West (contested Saskatoon—Clark's Crossing)	Ray Hnatyshyn	1974	Chris Axworthy	█ New Democratic
█ Progressive Conservative	The Battlefords—Meadow Lake	John Kenneth Gormley	1984	Len Taylor	█ New Democratic
█ Progressive Conservative	Edmonton East	William Lesick	1984	Ross Harvey	█ New Democratic
█ Progressive Conservative	Kootenay East	Stan Graham	1984	Sid Parker	█ New Democratic
█ Progressive Conservative	Kootenay West (contested Kootenay West—Revelstoke)	Robert Brisco	1984 (1974)	Lyle Kristiansen	█ New Democratic
█ Progressive Conservative	Mission—Port Moody (contested Mission—Coquitlam)	Gerry St. Germain	1983 by-election	Joy Langan	█ New Democratic
█ Progressive Conservative	Nanaimo—Alberni (contested Nanaimo—Cowichan)	Ted Schellenberg	1984	David Stupich	█ New Democratic
█ Progressive Conservative	Okanagan—Similkameen (contested Okanagan—Similkameen—Merritt)	Fred King	1979	Jack Whittaker	█ New Democratic
█ Progressive Conservative	Esquimalt—Saanich (contested Saanich—Gulf Islands)	Patrick Crofton	1984	Lynn Hunter	█ New Democratic
█ Progressive Conservative	Western Arctic	Dave Nickerson	1984	Ethel Blondin	█ Liberal
█ New Democratic	St. John's East	Jack Harris	1987 by-election	Ross Reid	█ Progressive Conservative
█ New Democratic	Broadview—Greenwood	Lynn McDonald	1982 by-election	Dennis Mills	█ Liberal
█ New Democratic	Hamilton Mountain	Marion Dewar	1987 by-election	Beth Phinney	█ Liberal
█ New Democratic	Kenora—Rainy River	John Edmund Parry	1984	Bob Nault	█ Liberal
█ New Democratic	Ottawa Centre	Mike Cassidy	1984	Mac Harb	█ Liberal
█ New Democratic	Thunder Bay—Nipigon	Ernie Epp	1984	Joe Comuzzi	█ Liberal
█ New Democratic	Winnipeg North Centre	Cyril Keeper	1984	David Walker	█ Liberal
█ New Democratic	Winnipeg North	David Orlikow	1962	Rey Pagtakhan	█ Liberal
█ Liberal	Outremont	Lucie Pépin	1984	Jean-Pierre Hogue	█ Progressive Conservative

=== Open seats that changed hands ===
Extended content

Party	Candidate	Incumbent retiring from the House	Riding	Won by	Party
█ Progressive Conservative	Morrissey Johnson	Morrissey Johnson	Bonavista—Trinity—Conception	Fred Mifflin	█ Liberal
█ Progressive Conservative	Gordon Lank	Melbourne Gass	Malpeque	Catherine Callbeck	█ Liberal
█ Progressive Conservative	Jean Gauvin	Roger Clinch	Gloucester	Doug Young	█ Liberal
█ Progressive Conservative	Reg Jewell	George Hees	Northumberland	Christine Stewart	█ Liberal
█ Progressive Conservative	Jack Arthur	Jack Ellis	Prince Edward—Hastings	Lyle Vanclief	█ Liberal
█ Progressive Conservative	Eric J. Cameron	Norman Warner	Stormont—Dundas	Bob Kilger	█ Liberal
█ Progressive Conservative	Sedluk Bryan Pearson	Thomas Suluk	Nunatsiaq	Jack Iyerak Anawak	█ Liberal
█ Progressive Conservative	Valerie Kordyban	Lorne McCuish	Prince George—Bulkley Valley	Brian Gardiner	█ New Democratic
█ Progressive Conservative	Geoff Young	Allan McKinnon	Victoria	John F. Brewin	█ New Democratic
█ Independent	N/A	Tony Roman	York North	Maurizio Bevilacqua	█ Liberal

=== New seats ===
Old riding	New riding	New seat won by	Party
Mississauga North	Mississauga East	Albina Guarnieri	█ Liberal
Mississauga North	Mississauga West	Robert Horner	█ Progressive Conservative

== Results by province ==
Party name		BC	AB	SK	MB	ON	QC	NB	NS	PE	NL	NT	YK	Total
Progressive Conservative	Seats:	12	25	4	7	46	63	5	5	-	2	-	-	169
Progressive Conservative	Popular vote:	35.3	51.8	36.4	36.9	38.2	52.7	40.4	40.9	41.5	42.2	26.4	35.3	43.0
Liberal	Seats:	1	-	-	5	43	12	5	6	4	5	2	-	83
Liberal	Vote:	20.4	13.7	18.2	36.5	38.9	30.3	45.4	46.5	49.9	45.0	41.4	11.3	31.9
New Democratic Party	Seats:	19	1	10	2	10	-	-	-	-	-	-	1	43
New Democratic Party	Vote:	37.0	17.4	44.2	21.3	20.1	14.4	9.3	11.4	7.5	12.4	28.3	51.4	20.38
Total seats		32	26	14	14	99	75	10	11	4	7	2	1	295
Parties that won no seats:
Reform	Vote:	4.8	15.4		3.3									2.1
Christian Heritage	Vote:		1.1			1.4							2.0	0.8
Rhinoceros	Vote:						1.2							0.4
Green	Vote:													0.4
Confederation of Regions	Vote:							4.3						0.3
Libertarian	Vote:													0.3
Commonwealth of Canada	Vote:						0.2							0.1
Communist	Vote:													0.1
Social Credit	Vote:													xx
Other	Vote:													0.4

xx - less than 0.05% of the popular vote.

Note: Parties that captured less than 1% of the vote in a province are not recorded.

== Election milestones ==
Until the 2011 federal election, the 1988 election was the most successful in the New Democratic Party's history. The party dominated in British Columbia and Saskatchewan, won significant support in Ontario and elected its first (and, until the 2008 election, only) member from Alberta. This is the most recent election in which the New Democrats won the most seats in British Columbia and Saskatchewan.

This was the second election contested by the Green Party, and it saw a more than 50 per cent increase in its vote, but it remained a minor party.

The election was the last for Canada's Social Credit Party. The party won no seats, and won an insignificant portion of the popular vote. The party attempted to fight the 1993 election, but lost its registration after being unable to field enough candidates.

This was the first election for the newly founded Reform Party which for this vote only contested seats in Western Canada. It was led by Preston Manning, who was himself a one time Socred candidate and the son of longtime Alberta Social Credit premier Ernest Manning.

Reform won no seats and a negligible percentage of the vote. However, Deborah Grey would win the first seat for Reform, Beaver River in Alberta, in a by-election held four months later. Grey, who had finished a distant fourth running in the same riding in the general election, succeeded rookie Progressive Conservative MP John Dahmer, who died of pancreatic cancer before taking office.

For the Progressive Conservatives, this was the last federal election they would ever win. A centre-right party would not win government until 2006, and a conservative party would not win over 40 per cent of the vote until 2025.

== Notes ==
- Number of parties: 11
  - First appearance: Christian Heritage Party, Reform Party
  - Final appearance: Confederation of Regions Party, Social Credit Party
  - Final appearance before hiatus: Communist Party (returned in 2000), Rhinoceros Party (returned in 2006)

=== 10 closest ridings ===
1. London-Middlesex, ON: Terry Clifford (PC) def. Garnet Bloomfield (Lib) by 8 votes
2. Northumberland, ON: Christine Stewart (Lib) def. Reg Jewell (PC) by 28 votes
3. Hamilton Mountain, ON: Beth Phinney (Lib) def. Marion Dewar (NDP) by 73 votes
4. York North, ON: Maurizio Bevilacqua (Lib) def. Micheal O'Brien (PC) by 77 votes
5. Rosedale, ON: David MacDonald (PC) def. Bill Graham (Lib) by 80 votes
6. London East, ON: Joe Fontana (Lib) def. Jim Jepson (PC) by 102 votes
7. Haldimand—Norfolk, ON: Bob Speller (Lib) def. Bud Bradley (PC) by 209 votes
8. Hillsborough, PE: George Proud (Lib) def. Thomas McMillan (PC) by 259 votes
9. Cariboo—Chilcotin, BC: Dave Worthy (PC) def. Jack Langford (NDP) by 269 votes
10. Vancouver Centre, BC: future Prime Minister Kim Campbell (PC) def. Johanna Den Hertog (NDP) by 269 votes

== See also ==
- 1911 Canadian federal election, an election similarly contested over free trade with the United States.
- 2025 Canadian federal election, another election in which trade relations with the United States were a major campaign issue
- List of Canadian federal general elections
- List of political parties in Canada

Articles on parties' candidates in this election:

- Independents
- Confederation of Regions
- Commonwealth
- Communist
- Green
- Libertarian
- Liberal
- New Democrats
- Progressive Conservative
- Rhinoceros
