= Burin—Burgeo =

Former federal electoral district in Newfoundland and Labrador, Canada

Newfoundland and Labrador electoral district

Defunct federal electoral district
- Legislature: House of Commons
- District created: 1949
- District abolished: 1976
- First contested: 1949
- Last contested: 1974

Burin—Burgeo was a federal electoral district in Newfoundland and Labrador, Canada, that was represented in the House of Commons of Canada from 1949 to 1979. This riding was created in 1949 when Newfoundland joined the Canadian Confederation. It was abolished in 1976 when it was merged into Burin—St. George's riding.

== History ==
The riding initially consisted of the Districts of Placentia West, Burin, Fortune Bay-Hermitage, and Burgeo and LaPoile and all the unorganized territory bounded on the North and West by the District of Grand Falls, on the South by the Districts of Burgeo and LaPoile and Fortune Bay-Hermitage, on the East by the Districts of Trinity North, Bonavista South and Bonavista North.

In 1952, it was redefined to consist of the Districts of Placentia West excluding the Iona Islands, Burin, Fortune Bay and Hermitage and Burgeo and LaPoile.

In 1966, it was redefined to consist of the provincial districts of Placentia West, Burin, Burgeo and LaPoile, and those parts of the provincial districts of Fortune Bay, Hermitage, Grand Falls and St. George's not included in the electoral districts of Gander-Twillingate, Grand Falls-White Bay-Labrador and Humber-St. George's-St. Barbe.

The electoral district was abolished in 1976.

== Members of Parliament ==
This riding elected the following members of Parliament:

Parliament	Years	Member	Party
Burin—Burgeo
21st	1949–1953	Chesley William Carter	Liberal
22nd	1953–1957	Chesley William Carter	Liberal
23rd	1957–1958	Chesley William Carter	Liberal
24th	1958–1962	Chesley William Carter	Liberal
25th	1962–1963	Chesley William Carter	Liberal
26th	1963–1965	Chesley William Carter	Liberal
27th	1965–1966	Chesley William Carter	Liberal
27th	1966–1968	Don Jamieson	Liberal
28th	1968–1972	Don Jamieson	Liberal
29th	1972–1974	Don Jamieson	Liberal
30th	1974–1979	Don Jamieson	Liberal
Riding dissolved into Burin—St. George's

== Election results ==
1949 Canadian federal election
Party	Candidate	Votes
Liberal	Chesley William Carter	12,590
Progressive Conservative	Grace Margaret Sparkes	1,053

1953 Canadian federal election
Party	Candidate	Votes
Liberal	Chesley William Carter	11,017
Progressive Conservative	Grace Margaret Sparkes	1,480

1957 Canadian federal election
Party	Candidate	Votes
Liberal	Chesley William Carter	acclaimed

1958 Canadian federal election
Party	Candidate	Votes
Liberal	Chesley William Carter	11,360
Progressive Conservative	Harvey Cole	4,847

1962 Canadian federal election
Party	Candidate	Votes
Liberal	Chesley William Carter	12,533
Progressive Conservative	Alec Gordon Stacey	3,163

1963 Canadian federal election
Party	Candidate	Votes
Liberal	Chesley William Carter	12,167
Progressive Conservative	Samuel Walters	2,439

1965 Canadian federal election
Party	Candidate	Votes
Liberal	Chesley William Carter	11,350
Progressive Conservative	Mervin E. Pond	3,360
Social Credit	Eric Dixon Cave Hiscock	444

By-election on 19 September 1966 On Mr. Carter being called to the Senate, 8 July 1966
Party	Candidate	Votes
Liberal	Don Jamieson	9,215
Progressive Conservative	Eric Dixon Cave Hiscock	1,107

1968 Canadian federal election
Party	Candidate	Votes
Liberal	Don Jamieson	8,674
Progressive Conservative	Robert Michael McGrath	5,440
New Democratic	Donald Barton	758

1972 Canadian federal election
Party	Candidate	Votes
Liberal	Don Jamieson	13,883
Progressive Conservative	Max Keeping	4,746
New Democratic	Lowell Paulson	336

1974 Canadian federal election
Party	Candidate	Votes
Liberal	Don Jamieson	13,530
Progressive Conservative	Max Strong	2,254
New Democratic	Lowell Paulson	721

== See also ==
- List of Canadian electoral districts
- Historical federal electoral districts of Canada
