= Chesley William Carter =

Canadian politician

The Honourable Chesley William Carter

Member of the Canadian Parliament for Burin—Burgeo
- In office June 27, 1949 – November 8, 1965
- Preceded by: Riding created
- Succeeded by: Don Jamieson

Senator for the Grand Bank, Newfoundland and Labrador
- In office July 8, 1966 – July 28, 1977
- Appointed by: Lester B. Pearson

Personal details
- Born: July 29, 1902 Pass Island, Newfoundland
- Died: January 14, 1994 (aged 91)
- Party: Liberal
- Relations: 2
- Children: 4
- Profession: Educator
- Committees: Chair, Standing Committee on Health, Welfare and Science (1974–1977)
- Portfolio: Parliamentary Secretary to the Minister of Veterans Affairs

Chesley William Carter (July 29, 1902 – January 14, 1994) was a Canadian Member of Parliament representing the riding of Burin—Burgeo and a senator for Grand Bank, Newfoundland and Labrador.

== Biography ==
Born in Pass Island, Hermitage Bay, Newfoundland, Carter was educated at Church of England School, Pass Island and Bishop Feild College, St. John's, and served in the Royal Newfoundland Regiment from 1917 to 1919. In 1941, he joined the Canadian Army to fight in World War II and discharged with the rank of Major in 1946. Carter entered politics in 1949, following Newfoundland's entry into Canadian Confederation, and was elected to the House of Commons as a Liberal in the 1949 federal election. He was re-elected in 1953, 1957 (when he was elected by acclamation), 1958, 1962, 1963 and 1965. On July 8, 1966 he was appointed to the Senate where he remained until he retired on July 28, 1977.
