= Rhinoceros Party of Canada candidates in the 1988 Canadian federal election =

The Rhinoceros Party of Canada fielded several candidates in the 1988 federal election, none of whom were elected.

== List of Candidates (incomplete) ==
=== Quebec ===
| Riding | Candidate's Name | Notes | Gender | Residence | Occupation | Votes | % | Rank |
|---|---|---|---|---|---|---|---|---|
| Papineau—Saint-Denis | Carole Ola Clermont | | F | | Coordinator | 987 | 2.51 | 4th |
| Richelieu | Paul Poison Hevey | Hevey's nickname was a bilingual pun, referring to poison ivy. | M | | Civil Servant | 457 | 0.98 | 5th |
| Verdun—Saint-Paul | Irène Maman Mayer | | F | | Teacher | 902 | 2.03 | 5th |

== Ontario ==
=== Nickel Belt: Keith J. Claven ===
Keith J. Claven listed his occupation as "merchant marine". He received 202 votes (0.52%), finishing fifth against New Democratic Party incumbent John Rodriguez.
