= Liberal Party of Canada candidates in the 1988 Canadian federal election =

The Liberal Party of Canada fielded 294 candidates in the 1988 federal election, and elected 83 Members of Parliament to retain their status as the Official Opposition. Many of these candidates have their own biography pages; information about others may be found here.

== Quebec ==
=== Richelieu: Yvon Hébert ===
Yvon Hébert was a tradesman, specializing in decoration. He strongly criticized the Canada-United States Free Trade Agreement, arguing that it would hurt his region's economy. He received 8,979 votes (19.27%), finishing second against Progressive Conservative incumbent Louis Plamondon.

== Ontario ==
=== Nickel Belt: Pierre Legros ===
Pierre Legros was a businessman, working with Adanac Vinyl in Sudbury. He received 9,178 votes (23.57%), finishing second against New Democratic Party incumbent John Rodriguez.
