= Bill Matthews =

Canadian politician

The Honourable Bill Matthews ECNL

Member of Parliament of Canada for Random—Burin—St. George's (Burin—St. George's, 1997–2004)
- In office September 22, 1997 – September 7, 2008
- Preceded by: Roger Simmons
- Succeeded by: Judy Foote

Member of Newfoundland and Labrador House of Assembly for Grand Bank
- In office 1982–1996
- Preceded by: Leslie Thoms
- Succeeded by: Judy Foote

Personal details
- Born: William Matthews; July 22, 1947 (age 79) Grand Bank, Dominion of Newfoundland
- Party: Liberal (1999–2008)
- Other political affiliations: Progressive Conservative (1982–1999)
- Profession: Teacher
- Portfolio: Fisheries & Oceans (Critic)

William Matthews (born July 22, 1947) is a Canadian politician.

== Political career ==
Matthews was a Progressive Conservative member of the Newfoundland and Labrador House of Assembly from 1982 to 1996. During this time, he was a cabinet minister, as Minister of Culture, Recreation and Youth from 1985 to 1988 and Minister of Career Development and Advanced Studies from 1988 to 1989.

Matthews was later elected to the House of Commons of Canada in 1997 as a member of the Progressive Conservative Party of Canada, representing the riding of Burin—St. George's. He crossed the floor to the Liberals in 1999, and continued to represent the riding until 2004. In that year's federal election, he was elected to the newly redistributed district of Random—Burin—St. George's, which he represented until 2008.

Matthews is a former teacher. He is a former Parliamentary Secretary to the Queen's Privy Council for Canada and Minister of Intergovernmental Affairs, Deputy House Leader of the Progressive Conservative Party, and Progressive Conservative critic of Fisheries and Oceans.

In March 2007, Matthews called Prime Minister Stephen Harper a "liar." While Speaker of the House Peter Milliken didn't give in to demands from outraged Tories to throw Matthews out of the chamber, Milliken did not allow Matthews to rise in the House for what would be the last 14 months of Matthews' career. Matthews did not run for reelection in the 2008 election.

In October 2018, Matthews was appointed as Chief of Staff to provincial PC leader Ches Crosbie in the Opposition Office.

Matthews contested the 2019 provincial election as the PC candidate in Burin-Grand Bank, but was defeated by Liberal incumbent Carol Anne Haley.

== Electoral record ==
2019 Newfoundland and Labrador general election
| Party | Candidate | Votes | % | ±% |
|---|---|---|---|---|
| Liberal | Carol Anne Haley | 2,822 | 51.6 | -27.8 |
| Progressive Conservative | Bill Matthews | 2,645 | 48.4 | +39.6 |
| Total valid votes | | 5,467 | 100 | |
| Total rejected ballots | | 54 | | |
| Turnout | | 65.7% | | |
| Eligible voters | | 8,403 | | |
| Liberal hold | | Swing | | -27.8 |

2006 Canadian federal election
| Party | Candidate | Votes | % | ±% | Expenditures |
|---|---|---|---|---|---|
| Liberal | Bill Matthews | 13,652 | 45.49 | -1.28 | $24,312.48 |
| Conservative | Cynthia Downey | 12,232 | 40.76 | +22.55 | $27,919.55 |
| New Democratic | Amanda Will | 3,702 | 12.34 | -20.95 | $842.43 |
| Green | Mark A. Brennan | 426 | 1.42 | -0.37 | none listed |
| Total valid votes/Expense limit | | 30,012 | 100.0 | – | $85,393 |
| Total rejected ballots | | 131 | 0.43 | -0.09 | |
| Turnout | | 30,143 | 52.09 | +7.18 | |
| Eligible voters | | 57,869 | | | |
| Liberal hold | | Swing | | -11.92 | |

2004 Canadian federal election
| Party | Candidate | Votes | % | ±% | Expenditures |
|---|---|---|---|---|---|
| Liberal | Bill Matthews | 12,383 | 46.77 | -1.03 | $32,788.03 |
| New Democratic | Desmond McGrath | 8,797 | 33.29 | +28.76 | $29,123.91 |
| Conservative | Larry Peckford | 4,820 | 18.21 | -7.18 | $35,579.47 |
| Green | Justin Dollimont | 474 | 1.79 | – | $468.70 |
| Total valid votes/Expense limit | | 26,474 | 100.0 | – | $83,804 |
| Total rejected, unmarked and declined ballots | | 139 | 0.52 | | |
| Turnout | | 26,613 | 44.91 | -12.34 | |
| Eligible voters | | 59,256 | | | |
| Liberal notional hold | | Swing | | -14.90 | |
Changes from 2000 are based on redistributed results. Change for the Conservatives is based on the combined totals of the Progressive Conservatives and the Canadian Alliance.

2000 Canadian federal election
| Party | Candidate | Votes |
|---|---|---|
| Liberal | Bill Matthews | 14,603 |
| Independent | Sam Synard | 7,891 |
| Progressive Conservative | Fred Pottle | 5,799 |
| Alliance | Peter Fenwick | 1,511 |
| New Democratic | David Sullivan | 924 |

1997 Canadian federal election
| Party | Candidate | Votes |
|---|---|---|
| Progressive Conservative | Bill Matthews | 13,884 |
| Liberal | Roger Simmons | 11,715 |
| New Democratic | David A. Sullivan | 4,784 |

1993 Newfoundland and Labrador general election
| Party | Candidate | Votes | % | ±% |
|---|---|---|---|---|
| Progressive Conservative | Bill Matthews | 3406 | – | – |
| Liberal | Judy Foote | 2805 | | |
| NDP | Joseph L. Edwards | 181 | | |

1989 Newfoundland and Labrador general election
| Party | Candidate | Votes | % | ±% |
|---|---|---|---|---|
| Progressive Conservative | Bill Matthews | 3948 | 68.6 | – |
| Liberal | Graham Wood | 1811 | 31.5 | |

1985 Newfoundland and Labrador general election
| Party | Candidate | Votes | % | ±% |
|---|---|---|---|---|
| Progressive Conservative | Bill Matthews | 3028 | 49.3 | – |
| Liberal | T. Maxwell Snook | 2689 | 43.7 | |
| NDP | Calvin Peach | 431 | 7.0 | |

1982 Newfoundland and Labrador general election
| Party | Candidate | Votes | % | ±% |
|---|---|---|---|---|
| Progressive Conservative | Bill Matthews | 2857 | 51.6 | – |
| Liberal | Leslie Thoms | 2442 | 44.1 | |
| NDP | Eric Miller | 234 | 4.23 | |
