= New Democratic Party candidates in the 1988 Canadian federal election =

The New Democratic Party ran a full slate of 295 candidates in the 1988 federal election, and elected 43 members to become the third-largest party in parliament. Many of the party's candidates have their own biography pages; information about others may be found here.

== Alberta ==
=== Calgary ===
Riding	Candidate's Name	Notes	Residence	Occupation	Votes	%	Rank
Calgary Centre	Elaine Husband				10,731	20.02	2nd
Calgary North	Tom Schepens				7,626		4th
Calgary Northeast	Ken Richmond				7,319	15.47	3rd
Calgary Southeast	Kathy Miller				6,837	13.19	2nd
Calgary Southwest	Vera Vogel				5,024	8.10	4th
Calgary West	Richard D. Vanderberg				6,355	11.61	4th

=== Edmonton ===
Riding	Candidate's Name	Notes	Residence	Occupation	Votes	%	Rank
Edmonton East	Ross Harvey				15,051	38.20	1st
Edmonton North	Nels Rissling				15,583		2nd
Edmonton Northwest	Marie Gordon				13,198	34.47	2nd
Edmonton Southeast	Harbans Dhillon				9,161		3rd
Edmonton Southwest	Bob Friedland				8,598		3rd
Edmonton—Strathcona	Halyna Freeland				13,686	25.32	2nd

=== Rural Alberta ===
Riding	Candidate's Name	Notes	Residence	Occupation	Votes	%	Rank
Athabasca	Ian Thorn				8,911	27.28	2nd
Beaver River	Brian Luther				6,492	20.89	3rd
Crowfoot	Fred Rappel				2,725	7.67	3rd
Elk Island	Rolf E. Nielsen				9,046		2nd
Lethbridge	Don Ferguson				4,489	9.80	2nd
Macleod	Gary Taje				2,884	8.58	4th
Medicine Hat	Jim Ridley				6,453	15.14	2nd
Peace River	Norman Dyck				7,389	17.17	2nd
Red Deer	Gail Garbutt				5,717	12.6	3rd
St. Albert	Dennis Pawlowski				8,370	19.60	2nd
Vegreville	Richard Johnson				6,035		2nd
Wetaskiwin	Terry Atkinson				5,741	14.3	2nd
Wild Rose	Robin Slater				3,209	7.7	4th
Yellowhead	Muriel Stanley Venne	ANDP candidate for Edmonton-Meadowlark in the 1986 Alberta provincial election		Indigenous rights activist	6,172	15.4	3rd

== Newfoundland and Labrador ==
Riding	Candidate's Name	Notes	Residence	Occupation	Votes	%	Rank
Bonavista-Trinity-Conception	Larry Welsh				2,372	5.72	3rd
Burin-St. George's	L. Joseph Edwards				2,299		3rd
Gander—Grand Falls	Bryan Blackmore				4,618		3rd
Humber—St. Barbe—Baie Verte	Marie Newhook				1,441	3.68	3rd
Labrador	Evelyn Riggs				1,508	11.32	3rd
St. John's East	Jack Harris	Member of Parliament for St. John's East (1987–1988)			17,198	35.30	2nd
St. John's West	Alfred J. Sullivan				2,333		3rd

== Nova Scotia ==
Riding	Candidate's Name	Notes	Residence	Occupation	Votes	%	Rank
Annapolis Valley—Hants	Keith Collins				5,886	12.52	3rd
Cape Breton—East Richmond	John Stevens				4,482		3rd
Cape Breton Highlands—Canso	Wilf Cude				2,036		3rd
Cape Breton—The Sydneys	Ed MacLeod				2,999		3rd
Central Nova	Gloria Murphy				5,110	13.02	3rd
Cumberland—Colchester	Barbara Jack				4,112	9.32	3rd
Dartmouth	Marty Zelenietz				5,162	10.86	3rd
Halifax	Ray Larkin				9,269	17.74	3rd
Halifax West	Lois Wiseman				9,011	16.25	3rd
South Shore	Bill Zimmerman				4,052	10.15	3rd
South West Nova	Peter Zavitz				2,396	5.69	3rd

== Prince Edward Island ==
Riding	Candidate's Name	Notes	Residence	Occupation	Votes	%	Rank
Cardigan	Gertrude Partridge				805	4.46	3rd
Egmont	Irene N. Dyment				1,438	7.52	3rd
Hillsborough	Dody Crane			Lawyer	1,984	5.78	3rd
Malpeque	Judy Whitaker				1,434	7.93	3rd

== New Brunswick ==
Riding	Candidate's Name	Notes	Residence	Occupation	Votes	%	Rank
Beauséjour	Lyman Dean				3,958	10.24	3rd
Carleton—Charlotte	Ben Kilfoil				2,596	7.7	3rd
Fredericton	Allan Sharp				4,922	10.32	3rd
Fundy—Royal	Rosemarie McNairn				4,965	10.97	3rd
Gloucester	Serge Robichaud				2,163	5.53	3rd
Madawaska—Victoria	Réal Couturier				2,441	8.0	3rd
Miramichi	Frank Clancy				1,686	6.09	4th
Moncton	Terry Boudreau				4,904	9.66	3rd
Restigouche	Nancy Quigley				3,272	10.6	3rd
Saint John	Judith Meinert				4,883	12.5	3rd

== Quebec ==
- Abitibi: Gerry Lemoyne
- Ahuntsic: Vincent Guadagnano
- Anjou—Rivière-des-Prairies: Vincent Marchione

Marchione' was a forty-nine-year-old educator and social worker in 1988. He focused his campaign on job creation, and won support in his multicultural riding with a nomination speech delivered in French, Italian, Creole, and English. Marchione later ran for a school board seat and led an environmental group that opposed the construction of petrochemical plants in east-end Montreal.

- Argenteuil—Papineau: André Marc Paré
- Beauce: Danielle Wolfe
- Beauharnois—Salaberry: Daniel Payette
- Bellechasse: Gilles Papillon
- Berthier—Montcalm: Pierre Arès
- Blainville—Deux-Montagnes: Louisette Tremblay-Hinton
- Bonaventure—Îles-de-la-Madeleine: Germaine Poirier
- Bourassa: Kéder Hyppolite
- Brome—Missisquoi: Paul Vachon
- Chambly: Phil Edmonston
- Champlain: Jocelyn Crête
- Charlesbourg: Denis Courteau
- Charlevoix: Kenneth Choquette
- Châteauguay: Pierre Hétu
- Chicoutimi: Mustapha Elayoubi
- Drummond: Ferdinand Berner
- Duvernay: Michel Agnaieff
- Frontenac: Claude L'Heureux
- Gaspé: Bertrand Réhel
- Gatineau—La Lièvre: Marius Tremblay
- Hochelaga—Maisonneuve: Gaétan Nadeau
- Hull—Aylmer: Danielle Lapointe-Vienneau
- Joliette: Claude Hétu
- Jonquière: Françoise Gauthier
- Kamouraska—Rivière-du-Loup: Maurice Tremblay
- La Prairie: Bruce Katz
- Lachine—Lac-Saint-Louis: Val Udvarhely
- Lac-Saint-Jean: Jean Paradis
- Langelier: Pauline Gingras
- LaSalle—Émard: Jean-Claude Bohrer
- Laurentides: Bill Clay
- Laurier—Sainte-Marie: François Beaulne
- Laval: Paul Cappon
- Laval-des-Rapides: John Shatilla
- Lévis: Jean-Paul Harney
- Longueuil: Daniel Senez
- Lotbinière: Richard Lacoursière
- Louis-Hébert: Pierre Lavigne
- Manicouagan: Carol Guay
- Matapédia—Matane: Yves Coté
- Mégantic—Compton—Stanstead: Jean-Pierre Walsh
- Mercier: André Cordeau
- Montmorency—Orléans: Éric Gourdeau
- Mount Royal: Tariq Alvi
- Notre-Dame-de-Grâce: Maria Peluso
- Outremont: Louise O'Neill
- Papineau—Saint-Michel: Giovanni Adamo

Adamo was an executive chef with longstanding ties to his riding's Italian community. He received 5,948 votes (15.10%), finishing third against Liberal incumbent André Ouellet.

- Pierrefonds—Dollard: Pierre Razik
- Pontiac—Gatineau—Labelle: John Trent
- Portneuf: Jean-Marie Fiset
- Québec-Est: Jeanne Lalanne
- Richelieu: Gaston Dupuis

Dupuis, an office clerk, ran as a New Democratic Party candidate in two elections. He ran his 1988 campaign from his work space and acknowledged that his party did not have a strong historical support base in Richelieu.

- Richmond—Wolfe: Marc-André Péloquin
- Rimouski—Témiscouata: Pierre Boisjoli
- Roberval: Réjean Lalancette
- Rosemont: Giuseppe Sciortino
- Saint-Denis: Jaime Llambias-Wolff
- Saint-Henri—Westmount: Ruth Rose
- Saint-Hubert: Nicole Desranleau
- Saint-Hyacinthe—Bagot: Hélène Lortie-Narayana
- Saint-Jean: Rezeq Faraj
- Saint-Laurent: Sid Ingerman
- Saint-Léonard: Michel Roche
- Saint-Maurice: Claude Rompré
- Shefford: Paul Pearson
- Sherbrooke: Alain Poirier
- Témiscamingue: Rémy Trudel
- Terrebonne: Lauraine Vaillancourt
- Trois-Rivières: Josée Trudel
- Vaudreuil: Suzanne Aubertin
- Verchères: Maria Jean
- Verdun—Saint-Paul: Alain Tassé

== Ontario ==
- Algoma: Lloyd Greenspoon
- Beaches—Woodbine: Neil Young
- Brampton: John Morris
- Brampton—Malton: Paul Ledgister
- Brant: Derek Blackburn
- Broadview—Greenwood: Lynn McDonald
- Bruce—Grey: Cathy Hird
- Burlington: Jane Mulkewich
- Cambridge: Bruce Davidson
- Carleton—Gloucester: Robert Cottingham
- Cochrane—Superior: Len Wood
- Davenport: Anna Menozzi
- Don Valley East: Brant Loper
- Don Valley North: Anton Kuerti
- Don Valley West: Ian Cameron
- Durham: Margaret Wilbur
- Eglinton—Lawrence: Vittoria Levi

Levi was born in Italy. She was a vocational rehabilitation counsellor and served as a representative of the National Congress for Italian Canadians in the 1980s. Early in 1988, she criticized Robert Elgie's proposals for provincial labour law reform as "a change for the worse" with respect to the rights of injured workers. She was forty-nine years old at the time of the election. She received 6,241 votes (15.57%), finishing third against Liberal candidate Joe Volpe.

- Elgin: Bob Habkirk
- Erie: Sean O'Flynn
- Essex—Kent: John Coggans
- Essex—Windsor: Steven W. Langdon
- Etobicoke Centre: Phil Jones
- Etobicoke North: Ted Humphreys
- Etobicoke—Lakeshore: Judy Brandow
- Glengarry—Prescott—Russell: Helena McCuaig
- Guelph—Wellington: Alex Michalos
- Haldimand—Norfolk: Eric Butt
- Halton—Peel: Fern Wolf
- Hamilton East: Dave Wilson
- Hamilton Mountain: Marion Dewar
- Hamilton West: Lesley Russell
- Hamilton—Wentworth: Julia McCrea
- Hastings—Frontenac—Lennox and Addington: Bud Acton
- Huron—Bruce: Tony McQuail
- Kenora—Rainy River: John Edmund Parry
- Kent: Leo Rustin
- Kingston and the Islands: Len Johnson

Major-General Leonard V. Johnson is from a military background. He joined the Royal Canadian Air Force in 1950, rose to the rank of major-general and served as Commandant of the National Defence College. He retired from the service in 1984. He represented the New Democratic Party in a national debate on defence issues in 1988 (Kingston Whig-Standard, 31 October 1988), and was the only candidate in Kingston and the Islands to argue that Canada should be made a Nuclear-Weapon-Free Zone (KWS, 11 November 1988). He also called for Canadian soldiers to be returned from Europe, arguing that large expenditures on overseas troops were hindering Canada's ability to run a modern navy (KWS, 11 November 1988). Johnson was considered a star candidate, and was backed by a strong local organization that outspent all other campaigns in the city (KWS, 25 May 1989). His support base was eroded by a strong Liberal campaign, however, and he finished third against Liberal Peter Milliken with 11,442 votes (20.10%). Following the election, Johnson was named Kingston chair of the peace group Project Plowshares (KWS, 21 December 1988).

- Kitchener: Sue Coulter
- Lambton—Middlesex: Larry Ross Green
- Lanark—Carleton: Bill Cox
- Leeds—Grenville: Barry Grills
- Lincoln: John Mayer
- London East: Marion Boyd
- London West: Bruce Lundgren
- London—Middlesex: Michael Wyatt
- Markham: Susan Krone
- Mississauga East: Walter Grozdanovski
- Mississauga South: Sue Craig
- Mississauga West: Paul Simon
- Nepean: Bea Murray
- Niagara Falls: Dick Harrington
- Nickel Belt: John Rodriguez
- Nipissing: Dawson Pratt
- Northumberland: Gord Barnes
- Oakville—Milton: Richard J. Banigan
- Ontario: Jim Wiseman
- Oshawa: Ed Broadbent
- Ottawa Centre: Mike Cassidy
- Ottawa South: John Fryer
- Ottawa West: Theresa Kavanagh
- Ottawa—Vanier: Kathryn Barnard
- Oxford: Brian Donlevy
- Parkdale—High Park: Abby Pollonetsky
- Parry Sound—Muskoka: Joanne Malchuk
- Perth—Wellington—Waterloo: Linda Ham
- Peterborough: Gillian Sandeman
- Prince Edward—Hastings: Don Wilson
- Renfrew: Elizabeth Ives-Ruyter
- Rosedale: Doug Wilson
- Sarnia—Lambton: Julie Foley
- Sault Ste. Marie: Steve Butland
- Scarborough Centre: Garth C. Dee
- Scarborough East: Mary Cook
- Scarborough West: Dave Gracey
- Scarborough—Agincourt: Susie Vallance
- Scarborough—Rouge River: Raymond Cho
- Scarborough Centre: Judy Watson
- Simcoe North: Mike McMurter
- St. Catharines: Rob West
- St. Paul's: Diane Bull
- Stormont—Dundas: Steve J. Corrie
- Sudbury: Bill Major

Major is a retired United Church minister. He joined the New Democratic Party in 1962 after hearing Tommy Douglas speak in Hamilton. He was ordained as a minister in 1969, moved to Sudbury in 1978, and served for nine years as coordinator for the Pastoral Institute of Northeastern Ontario. Major sought the provincial New Democratic Party nomination for Sudbury East in 1987, but lost to Shelley Martel. He subsequently spoke against the Canada-United States Free Trade Agreement, arguing that it allow Northern Ontario to become a source of income for giant American manufacturers. He ran a strong campaign, but ultimately finished second against Liberal candidate Diane Marleau with 11,811 votes (27.77%).

- Thunder Bay—Atikokan: Iain Angus
- Thunder Bay—Nipigon: Ernie Epp
- Timiskaming: Earl Evans
- Timmins—Chapleau: Cid Samson
- Trinity—Spadina: Dan Heap
- Victoria—Haliburton: Cathy Vainio
- Waterloo: Scott Piatkowski
- Welland—St. Catharines—Thorold: Ken Lee
- Wellington—Grey—Dufferin—Simcoe: Shirley Farlinger
- Willowdale: Abbe Adelson
- Windsor West: Paul Forder
- Windsor—Lake St. Clair: Howard McCurdy
- York Centre: Cathy Mele
- York North: Evelyn Buck
- York South—Weston: Steve Krashinsky
- York West: Alice Lambrinos
- York—Simcoe: Judy Darcy

== Manitoba ==
- Brandon—Souris: Dave Serle
- Churchill: Rod Murphy
- Dauphin—Swan River: Eric Irwin
- Lisgar—Marquette: Fred Tait
- Portage—Interlake: Gerry Follows
- Provencher: Mary Sabovitch
- Selkirk: Howard Pawley
- St. Boniface: Alan Turner
- Winnipeg North: David Orlikow
- Winnipeg North Centre: Cyril Keeper
- Winnipeg South: Len Van Roon
- Winnipeg South Centre: Les Campbell
- Winnipeg Transcona: Bill Blaikie
- Winnipeg—St. James: Len Sawatsky

== Saskatchewan ==
- Kindersley—Lloydminster: Grant Whitmore
- Mackenzie: Vic Althouse
- Moose Jaw—Lake Centre: Rod Laporte
- Prince Albert—Churchill River: Ray Funk
- Regina—Lumsden: Les Benjamin
- Regina—Qu'Appelle: Simon de Jong
- Regina—Wascana: Dickson Bailey
- Saskatoon—Clark's Crossing: Chris Axworthy
- Saskatoon—Dundurn: Ron Fisher
- Saskatoon—Humboldt: Stan Hovdebo
- Souris—Moose Mountain: Jeff Sample
- Swift Current—Maple Creek—Assiniboia: Laura Balas
- The Battlefords—Meadow Lake: Len Taylor
- Yorkton—Melville: Lorne Nystrom
