= Green Party of Canada candidates in the 1988 Canadian federal election =

The Green Party of Canada fielded 68 candidates in the 1988 Canadian federal election, none of whom were elected. Some of the party's candidates have their own biography pages; information about others may be found here.

== List of candidates (incomplete) ==
=== Quebec ===
Riding	Candidate's Name	Notes	Gender	Residence	Occupation	Votes	%	Rank
Anjou—Rivière-des-Prairies	Mario Paul		M		Physical education teacher	1,217	2.29	4th
Papineau—Saint-Denis	H. Joseph Vega	Vega later ran for Montreal city council in the 1994 municipal election, contesting the Étienne-Desmarteau division as a candidate of the Democratic Coalition–Ecology Montreal alliance. He finished in fourth place.	M		Construction worker	469	1.19	5th
Richelieu	Jacqueline Lacoste	Lacoste was credited with a very strong performance in a local all-candidates debate during the election. Some of her more enthusiastic supporters later speculated that she could finish in second place, which would have been a historic showing for the party.	F		Manager	1,896	4.07	4th
Verdun—Saint-Paul	Jan-Marc Lavergne	A veteran comedian, Lavergne has been active for many years with the Ligue Nationale d'Improvisation and was inducted into their hall of fame in 2003.	M		Comedian	1,339	3.02	3rd
