= Libertarian Party of Canada candidates in the 2015 Canadian federal election =

Political party of Canada

This is a list of the candidates who ran for the Libertarian Party of Canada in the 42nd Canadian federal election.

== British Columbia ==
Riding	Candidate's Name	Notes	Gender	Residence	Votes	%	Rank
Burnaby North-Seymour	Chris Tylor		Male		252	0.5%	
Burnaby South	Liz Jaluague		Female		499	1.1%	
Chilliwack—Hope	Alexander Johnson		Male		416	0.8%	
Coquitlam—Port Coquitlam	Lewis Clarke Dahlby		Male		1014	1.8%	
Langley—Aldergrove	Lauren Southern		Female		535	0.9%	
New Westminster-Burnaby	Rex Brocki		Male		1368	2.6%	
North Vancouver	Ismet Yetisen		Male		136	0.2%	
Prince George—Peace River—Northern Rockies	Todd Keller		Male		559	1.1%	
Saanich—Gulf Islands	Meghan Porter		Female		249	0.4%	
South Surrey-White Rock	Bonnie Hu		Female		261	0.5%	
Steveston—Richmond East	Matt Swanston		Male		274	0.6%	
Vancouver Centre	John Clarke		Male		614	1.1%	
Vancouver Kingsway	Matt Kadioglu		Male		468	1.0%	
Victoria	Art Lowe		Male		539	0.8%	

== Alberta ==
Riding	Candidate's Name	Notes	Gender	Residence	Votes	%	Rank
Calgary Forest Lawn	Matt Badura		Male		832	2.0%	
Calgary Heritage	Steven Paolasini		Male		246	0.4%	
Calgary Nose Hill	Edward Gao		Male		727	1.3%	
Calgary Signal Hill	Tim Moen		Male		679	1.1%	
Edmonton Griesbach	Maryna Goncharenko		Female		415	0.9%	
Edmonton Mill Woods	Allen K. W. Paley		Male		396	0.8%	
Edmonton Riverbend	Steven Lack		Male		386	0.7%	
Edmonton Strathcona	Malcolm Stinson		Male		311	0.6%	
Edmonton West	Alexander Dussault		Male		341	0.6%	
Edmonton-Wetaskiwin	Brayden Whitlock		Male		495	0.7%	
Foothills	Cory Morgan		Male		424	0.7%	
Fort McMurray—Cold Lake	Scott Berry		Male		552	1.2%	
Grande Prairie-Mackenzie	Dylan Thompson		Male		613	1.2%	
Lakeland	Robert McFadzean		Male		601	1.1%	
Peace River—Westlock	Jeremy Sergeew		Male		443	0.9%	
Red Deer—Mountain View	James Walper		Male		445	0.7%	
Sherwood Park—Fort Saskatchewan	Stephen Burry		Male		678	1.0%	
Yellowhead	Cory Lystang		Male		817	1.6%	

== Saskatchewan ==
Riding	Candidate's Name	Notes	Gender	Residence	Votes	%	Rank
Regina—Lewvan	Wojciech Dolata		Male		298	0.6%	
Saskatoon West	Bronek Hart		Male		230	0.6%	

== Manitoba ==
Riding	Candidate's Name	Notes	Gender	Residence	Votes	%	Rank
Churchill—Keewatinook Aski	Zachary Linnick		Male		255	0.6%	
Selkirk—Interlake—Eastman	Donald Grant		Male		882	1.8%	

== Ontario ==
Riding	Candidate's Name	Notes	Gender	Residence	Votes	%	Rank
Barrie—Springwater—Oro-Medonte	Darren Roskam		Male		401	0.8%	
Brantford—Brant	Rob Ferguson		Male		515	0.8%	
Don Valley West	John Kittredge		Male		325	0.6%	
Eglinton-Lawrence	Ethan Buchman		Male		308	0.6%	
Glengarry-Prescott-Russell	Jean-Serge Brisson		Male		377	0.6%	
Guelph	Alex Fekri		Male		520	0.7%	
Hamilton Centre	Robert Young		Male		316	0.8%	
Hamilton Mountain	Andrew Caton		Male		763	1.5%	
Kingston and the Islands	Luke McAllister		Male		305	0.5%	
Kitchener Centre	Slavko Miladinovic		Male		515	1.0%	
Kitchener—Conestoga	Rich Hodgson Jr.		Male		685	1.4%	
Kitchener South—Hespeler	Nathan Lajeunesse		Male		772	1.6%	
Lanark-Frontenac-Kingston	Mark Budd		Male		418	0.7%	
London West	Jacques Boudreau		Male		732	1.1%	
Milton	Chris Jewell		Male		493	1.0%	
Mississauga—Lakeshore	Paul Woodworth		Male		316	0.5%	
Niagara West	Allan DeRoo		Male		797	1.6%	
Oakville North-Burlington	David Clement		Male		666	1.1%	
Ottawa Centre	Dean T. Harris		Male		551	0.7%	
Ottawa South	Damien Wilson		Male		237	0.4%	
Ottawa-Vanier	Coreen Corcoran		Female		503	0.8%	
Parkdale-High Park	Mark E. Jeftovic		Male		610	1.0%	
Scarborough Centre	Katerina Androutsos		Female		1384	3.1%	
Thornhill	Gene Balfour		Male		587	1.1%	
University—Rosedale	Jesse Waslowski		Male		233	0.4%	
Vaughan-Woodbridge	Anthony Gualtieri		Male		716	1.5%	
York South—Weston	Stephen Lepone		Male		1041	2.4%	

== Quebec ==
Riding	Candidate's Name	Notes	Gender	Residence	Votes	%	Rank
Beauport—Limoilou	Francis Bedard		Male		423	0.8%	
Beloeil—Chambly	Michael Maher		Male		245	0.4%	
Laurier—Sainte-Marie	Stephane Beaulieu		Male		604	1.1%	
Montarville	Claude Leclair		Male		641	1.1%	
Outremont	Francis Pouliot		Male		216	0.5%	
Rosemont—La Petite-Patrie	Peter d'Entremont		Male		353	0.6%	
Thérèse-De Blainville	Daniel Guindon		Male		355	0.6%	
Trois-Rivières	Maxime Rousseau		Male		360	0.6%	

== Nova Scotia ==
Riding	Candidate's Name	Notes	Gender	Residence	Votes	%	Rank
Sydney—Victoria	Wayne James Hiscock		Male			242	0.6%
