= Progressive Conservative Party of Ontario candidates in the 1995 Ontario provincial election =

The Progressive Conservative Party of Ontario fielded a full slate of candidates in the 1995 Ontario provincial election, and won a majority government with 82 out of 130 seats. Many of the party's candidates have their own biography pages; information about others may be found here.

== Frank Ellis (Downsview) ==
Ellis was a forty-six-year-old teacher and transportation consultant, involved with the firm . He supported a private-sector job-networking system, and a two-year freeze on tuition. He indicated that he was campaigning more as a "concerned citizen" than a Progressive Conservative candidate. He received 4,444 votes (19.19%), finishing third against Liberal candidate Annamarie Castrilli.

== Archie Heide (St. Catharines) ==
Heide was over sixty years old at the time of the election. He moved to the Niagara Peninsula at age six, and later practiced in the area as a general and vascular surgeon. He was active with the Lincoln County Academy of Medicine, and with the district and provincial branches of the Ontario Medical Association. For eight years, he served on the advisory committee for the College of Physicians and Surgeons in Ontario. He is also an active Rotarian and a member of the Mennonite Brethren community.

He received 11,486 votes (38.84%) in the 1995 election, finishing second against Liberal incumbent Jim Bradley.

Heide was appointed to the Niagara District Health Council in 1998 by the Progressive Conservative government of Mike Harris. Ironically, Jim Bradley announced the Liberal Party's support for his nomination at a meeting of the Standing Committee on Government Agencies.

== Richard Zanibbi (Sudbury) ==
Richard Zanibbi is a health-care administrator and former police officer.

After serving as deputy police chief for Nepean, Zanibbi became the police chief for Sudbury in early 1985. Shortly after his appointment, he pressed charges against one of his officers who was accused of drinking and attending a Super Bowl party while on duty. Zanibbi said that he took this step in order to ensure Sudbury residents that he would run a force free of corruption. He also implemented an affirmative action program, and in 1988 called for a decentralized, community-based approach to policing.

In 1988, Zanibbi opposed a provincial plan requiring municipalities to provide security to Ontario courtrooms. Zanibbi argued that the extra security would be expensive, and would take officers off the streets. Two years later, he opposed the province's plans to create independent civilian commissions that would investigate charges of police misconduct. He later took part in secret negotiations to create a protocol that would exempt off-duty officers from investigation by such bodies. During the same period, he called for police to form a more effective lobbyist organization.

Zanibbi received 8,093 votes (26.64%) in the 1995 provincial election, finishing third against Liberal candidate Rick Bartolucci. He was later appointed to the board of the Manitoulin-Sudbury Community Care Access Centre, and became its chair in 2001 after Bob Fera resigned in protest against provincial government policies. Zanibbi was later confirmed as chair in 2002. In 2003, he announced that an in-home nursing services contract would be granted to Bayshore Health Care Ltd., rather than the previous provider, the Victorian Order of Nurses. Some criticized the awarding of this contract to a private, for-profit provider, and argued that services would be jeopardized. Zanibbi said that he would have preferred to retain VON's services, but that the disparity in bids was simply too great. He announced cuts to home-making services later in the year, arguing that his agency was not permitted to run a deficit. In 2004, he announced that a three-year $18 million contract would be shared by three agencies.

In 2005, the Manitoulin-Sudbury Community Care Access Centre was given a three-year accreditation award by the Canadian Council on Health Services. Zanibbi was succeeded as chair by Tom Trainor in May of the same year.

Zanibbi has also served as president of the board of directors of the Idylwylde Golf and Country Club.

== Joe Durocher (Windsor—Sandwich) ==
Durocher was a high-school teacher and part-time farmer. He was originally affiliated with the Liberal Party of Canada, and worked on a number of campaigns for federal cabinet minister Eugene Whelan.

He was elected to the council of Sandwich West (soon to be renamed as LaSalle) in the 1988 Ontario municipal elections, winning the third of three seats in an at-large ballot. A rival candidate tried to overturn the decision on the grounds that Durocher had violated election rules by including pizza coupons in his campaign literature, but the challenge was withdrawn (Windsor Star, 15 February 1989). Durocher topped the polls for re-election in 1991.

In 1992, Durocher initiated a motion on the LaSalle council endorsing the federal Charlottetown Accord. He wrote, "It would have been much more politically prudent to stay out of the referendum argument for fear of alienating voters. Instead, I chose to take a stand for no other reason than to serve my country" (Windsor Star, 30 October 1992). He sought the federal Liberal nomination for Essex in the 1993 Canadian election, but lost to Eugene Whalen's daughter Susan (Vancouver Sun, 5 December 1992).

He had planned to the Ontario Liberal Party nomination in Windsor—Sandwich for the 1995 provincial election, did not file his forms. He later claimed he was prevented from mounting a serious campaign by local party figures who supported rival candidate Sandra Pupatello (Windsor Star, 21 February 1995).

Durocher then joined the Progressive Conservative Party, and won its nomination for Windsor—Sandwich without opposition. He received 5,704 votes (22.51%) in the election, finishing third against Pupatello.

He remained a member of the LaSalle council, and in 1996 brought forward a motion for the town to clarify the terms under which it could leave Essex County (Windsor Star, 13 September 1996). He may have left the council in 1997, and was no longer a member by 2000.

He is running for mayor of LaSalle in the 2006 municipal elections.

== Larry Edwards (York South) ==
Edwards was a physician in Toronto, specializing in internal medicine. He was fifty-eight years old at the time of the election, and had worked in the area for twenty-five years, as well as participating in international relief efforts through Doctors Without Borders.

Edwards received 7,726 votes (30.51%) for a second-place finish against New Democratic Party Premier Bob Rae. Later in the year, he was cited by Liberal Member of Provincial Parliament Mike Colle as opposing an omnibus bill brought forward by the newly elected Progressive Conservative government of Mike Harris. Colle quoted Edwards as saying, "This is not what I ran for".
