= Opinion polling for the 1988 Canadian federal election =

Polls leading up to the 1988 Canadian federal election.

== National polls ==
Graph of opinion polls conducted

=== Campaign period ===
Evolution of voting intentions at national level
Polling firm	Last day of survey	Source	PC	LPC	NDP	Other	ME	Sample	Margin
Voting results			43.02	31.92	20.38	4.68			11.10
Gallup	November 19, 1988		40	35	22	3	—	—	—
Insight Canada Research	November 18, 1988		43	32	20	5	—	—	—
Angus Reid	November 17, 1988		41	33	23	3	± 2.5	1,512	8
Gallup	November 12, 1988		35	35	26	4	± 4.0	1,026	0
Canadian Facts	November 8, 1988		38	38	21	—	± 2.2	2,200	0
Angus Reid	November 8, 1988		39	35	24	—	± 2.5	1,501	4
Environics	November 8, 1988		35	37	24	5	—	1,275	—
Gallup	November 5, 1988		31	43	22	—	± 4.0	1,041	12
Insight Canada Research	November 3, 1988		37	40	20	3	± 3.2	1,101	3
Environics	October 30, 1988		31	37	26	6	—	727	—
Insight Canada Research	November 3, 1988		35	39	23	3	—	1,100	—
Gallup	October 29, 1988		38	32	27	3	—	1,034	—
Angus Reid	October 27, 1988		35	35	28	2	± 2.5	1,502	0
Environics	October 26, 1988		32	32	28	8	—	811	—
Gallup	October 15, 1988		39	29	28	4	± 4.0	1,027	10
Environics	October 10, 1988		42	25	29	5	—	1,515	—
Angus Reid	October 3, 1988		45	26	27	2	± 2.5	1,512	19
Gallup	October 3, 1988		43	33	22	2	± 4.0	1,061	10
Official call of federal elections (October 1, 1988)

=== During the 33rd Parliament of Canada ===
Evolution of voting intentions at national level
Polling firm	Last day of survey	Source	PC	LPC	NDP	Other	ME	Sample
Gallup	September 10, 1988		37	33	27	—	± 4.0	1,032
Gallup	August 6, 1988		34	35	30	—	± 4.0	1,036
Environics	July 26, 1988		34	38	26	—	± 2.5	1,503
Angus Reid	July 25, 1988		35	34	28	—	—	—
Gallup	July 11, 1988		35	37	27	1	—	—
Environics	June 27, 1988		31	37	30	2	—	1,992
Angus Reid	June 21, 1988		33	34	31	2	± 2.5	1,506
Gallup	June 4, 1988		31	39	29	1	—	—
Angus Reid	May 18, 1988		31	37	30	2	—	—
Gallup	May 7, 1988		28	39	31	2	—	—
Gallup	April 9, 1988		31	38	30	1	—	—
Environics	March 24, 1988		29	40	30	1	—	1,983
Angus Reid	March 21, 1988		34	30	34	2	± 2.5	1,517
Gallup	March 5, 1988		28	37	33	2	—	—
Angus Reid	February 23, 1988		32	33	33	2	± 2.5	1,521
Gallup	February 6, 1988		27	41	31	1	± 4.0	1,022
Gallup	January 9, 1988		30	36	31	2	—	—
	Ratification of the Canada-U.S. Free Trade Agreement (January 2, 1988)							
Gallup	December 5, 1987		29	35	34	2	± 4.0	1,000
Angus Reid	December 4, 1987		30	37	32	—	± 2.5	1,507
Gallup	November 7, 1987		25	40	33	2	—	—
Gallup	October 10, 1987		23	38	38	1	—	—
Gallup	September 5, 1987		25	36	37	2	—	—
Gallup	August 8, 1987		25	36	37	2	—	—
Gallup	July 11, 1987		23	35	41	1	—	—
Angus Reid	June 24, 1987		26	32	40	—	± 2.5	1,504
Environics	June 10, 1987		26	36	37	—	—	—
Gallup	June 6, 1987		24	39	35	2	—	—
	Signing of the Meech Lake Accord (June 2–3, 1987)							
Angus Reid	May 25, 1987		22	38	38	—	± 2.5	1,521
Angus Reid	May 11, 1987		25	36	37	—	—	1,670
Gallup	May 9, 1987		26	42	30	3	—	1,014
Gallup	April 11, 1987		24	42	32	3	—	1,008
Gallup	March 14, 1987		24	41	34	1	—	—
Angus Reid	March 6, 1987		23	42	33	2	± 2.5	1,666
Gallup	February 14, 1987		22	44	32	2	—	—
Gallup	January 10, 1987		28	41	30	1	—	—
Gallup	December 6, 1986		30	45	25	1	—	—
Gallup	November 8, 1986		31	39	29	1	—	—
Gallup	October 4, 1986		31	38	29	1	—	—
Gallup	September 13, 1986		35	36	28	2	± 4.0	1,000
Gallup	August 16, 1986		33	41	24	2	—	—
Gallup	August 9, 1986		31	35	33	1	—	—
Gallup	July 5, 1986		36	41	21	2	—	—
Angus Reid	June 24, 1986		31	38	27	—	—	1,673
CROP-Environics	June 15, 1986		36	39	24	—	—	2,040
Gallup	June 7, 1986		32	40	27	1	—	—
Angus Reid	May 13, 1986		38	36	24	—	± 2.5	1,063
Gallup	May 3, 1986		32	40	27	1	—	—
Gallup	April 5, 1986		37	40	21	2	—	—
Gallup	March 15, 1986		41	34	25	1	—	—
Gallup	February 8, 1986		36	41	23	1	—	—
Gallup	December 7, 1985		37	38	24	1	—	—
Gallup	November 9, 1985		40	36	24	0	—	—
Gallup	October 5, 1985		43	35	22	1	—	—
Gallup	September 7, 1985		48	29	22	1	—	—
Angus Reid	August 27, 1985		46	29	21	4	—	—
Gallup	August 10, 1985		46	32	20	2	—	1,037
Gallup	July 13, 1985		40	33	26	1	—	—
Gallup	June 8, 1985		44	33	21	2	—	—
Gallup	May 18, 1985		45	31	22	1	—	—
Gallup	April 6, 1985		54	24	21	1	± 4.0	1,037
Gallup	February 23, 1985		56	26	17	1	—	—
Gallup	February 2, 1985		53	25	21	1	—	—
Gallup	January 5, 1985		53	25	21	1	± 4.0	1,054
Gallup	December 8, 1984		54	24	20	2	—	—
CROP	November 30, 1984		57	22	20	1	± 2.0	1,971
Gallup	November 3, 1984		55	23	20	2	—	—
Gallup	October 13, 1984		60	21	17	3	—	—
Election 1984	September 4, 1984		50.03	28.02	18.81	3.14		

== By geographic area ==
=== In Québec ===
Evolution of voting intentions in Québec
Polling firm	Last day of survey	Source	PC	LPC	NDP	Other	ME	Sample
	Voting results		52.7	30.3	14.4	2.6		
Gallup	November 19, 1988		47	32	17	4	—	—
CROP	November 18, 1988		45	36	17	—	—	—
Angus Reid	November 17, 1988		50	29	21	0	—	—
Angus Reid	November 8, 1988		49	35	16	—	—	—
Environics	November 8, 1988		45	33	18	4	—	—
Gallup	November 5, 1988		32	46	18	2	—	—
Environics	October 30, 1988		34	35	23	8	—	—
Gallup	October 15, 1988		45	30	23	2	—	—
Environics	October 10, 1988		47	23	25	5	—	—
Angus Reid	October 3, 1988		56	20	23	1	—	—
Gallup	October 3, 1988		44	34	20	2	—	—
	Official call of federal elections (October 1, 1988)							
CROP	September 22, 1988		42	30	27	0	—	—
Gallup	August 6, 1988		37	41	23	—	—	—
Gallup	July 9, 1988		42	37	20	—	—	—
CROP	June 22, 1988		31	45	23	1	—	1,605
Angus Reid	June 21, 1988		35	36	26	3	—	—
Gallup	June 4, 1988		22	50	26	—	—	—
Sorécom	May 24, 1988		31	40	27	—	± 3.0	1,102
Angus Reid	May 18, 1988		28	41	30	1	—	—
CROP	May 18, 1988		30	44	26	1	—	—
CROP	April 19, 1988		26	46	28	0	—	—
Sorecom	April 13, 1988		31	38	31	0	—	991
Gallup	April 9, 1988		20	43	36	1	—	—
Environics	March 24, 1988		24	46	29	—	—	—
CROP	March 7, 1988		27	46	26	1	± 4.0	647
Sorécom	February 28, 1988		28	39	31	—	—	1,191
Angus Reid	February 23, 1988		31	32	35	—	—	—
Gallup	February 6, 1988		21	51	27	—	—	—
Gallup	January 9, 1988		28	38	32	—	—	—
Gallup	November 7, 1987		25	38	—	—	—	—
CROP	June 18, 1987		22	46	31	1	—	—
Angus Reid	May 25, 1987		16	30	50	—	—	—
Gallup	April 11, 1987		17	49	34	—	—	—
IQOP	April 10, 1987		18	41	41	—	—	—
Angus Reid	March 4, 1987		17	40	40	—	—	392
Sorécom	February 27, 1987		18	45	36	—	± 2.3	1,200
Sorécom	September 26, 1986		27	43	31	—	—	1,824
Angus Reid	June 24, 1986		20	48	27	—	—	—
CROP/Environics	June 15, 1986		25	49	25	—	—	—
Sorécom	May 25, 1986		28	42	30	—	± 3.0	1,995
Angus Reid	May 13, 1986		30	45	22	—	—	—
UdeM	April 22, 1986		32	50	16	2	—	2,013
Sorécom	February 28, 1986		27	47	26	1	± 2.89	1,227
IQOP	January 24, 1986		23	54	21	—	—	—
Sorécom	May 23, 1985		57	26	16	1	—	—
Election 1984			50.2	35.4	8.8	5.6		

=== In Ontario ===
Evolution of voting intentions in Ontario
Polling firm	Last day of survey	Source	PC	LPC	NDP	Other	ME	Sample
Voting results	November 21, 1988		38.2	38.9	20.1	2.8		
Environics	October 10, 1988		37	27	33	3	—	—
Gallup	February 6, 1988		26	42	32	0	—	—
Gallup	January 9, 1988		28	42	30	0	—	—
Elections in 1984			47.6	29.8	20.8	1.8		

=== In Alberta ===
Evolution of voting intentions in Alberta
Polling firm	Last day of survey	Source	PC	LPC	NDP	Reform	Other	ME	Sample
Voting results			51.8	13.7	17.4	15.4	1.7		
Environics	October 10, 1988		49	15	24	12	0	—	—
Angus Reid	June 24, 1986		51	18	27	—	4	—	—
Elections in 1984			68.8	12.7	14.1	—	4.4		

=== In British Columbia ===
Evolution of voting intentions in British Columbia
Polling firm	Last day of survey	Source	PC	LPC	NDP	Reform	Other	ME	Sample
Voting results			35.3	20.4	37.0	4.8	2.5		
Environics	October 10, 1988		31	22	40	—	7	—	—
Gallup	October 3, 1988		39	25	29	—	7	—	—
Angus Reid	May 25, 1987		24	34	42	–	0	—	—
Elections in 1984			46.6	16.4	35.1	–	1.9		
