= Alex Hickman =

Canadian politician

Member of the Newfoundland House of Assembly
- In office 1966–1979
- Preceded by: Eric Jones
- Succeeded by: Leslie Thoms
- Constituency: Grand Bank

Personal details
- Born: Thomas Alexander Hickman; October 19, 1925 Grand Bank, Newfoundland
- Died: January 10, 2016 (aged 90) Newfoundland and Labrador
- Education: Memorial University of Newfoundland, Dalhousie University

Thomas Alexander Hickman, OC QC (October 19, 1925 – January 10, 2016) was a Canadian lawyer, politician and judge.

== Biography ==
Born in Grand Bank, Newfoundland (present-day Newfoundland and Labrador, Canada), Hickman studied at Memorial University of Newfoundland and received a LL.B from Dalhousie University in 1947. He was called to the Bar of Nova Scotia in 1947, and to the Bar of Newfoundland in 1948. In 1964, he was made a Queen's Counsel. He started to practice law in 1948.

From 1966 to 1979, he was a member of the Newfoundland House of Assembly. He held numerous cabinet positions including Minister of Justice and Attorney General, Minister of Health, Minister Responsible for Intergovernmental Affairs, Minister of Finance, and Minister of Education.

In 1979, he was appointed to the Supreme Court of Newfoundland as Chief Justice of the Trial Division. As Chief Justice, he was the chairman of two well known Royal Commissions. From 1982 to 1985, he was the chairman of the Royal Commission on the Ocean Ranger marine disaster. From 1986 to 1989, he was the chairman of the Royal Commission on the Donald Marshall, Jr.

== Personal life ==
In 2003, he was made an Officer of the Order of Canada. Hickman died of cancer on January 10, 2016, at the age of 90.
