= Libertarian Party of Canada candidates in the 1988 Canadian federal election =

Listing of candidates

The Libertarian Party of Canada fielded a number of candidates in the 1988 federal election, none of whom were elected. Information about these candidates may be found here.

== Alberta ==
=== Calgary West: David Faren ===
Faren listed himself as an advertising consultant. In 1997, he wrote an article sympathetic to efforts to change Canada's cannabis laws. He received 225 votes (0.4%) in 1993, finishing fifth against Progressive Conservative incumbent James Hawkes.

=== Edmonton Southwest: R. John Hayes ===
Hayes was a freelance writer at the time of the 1988 election. He received 356 votes to finish fifth of six candidates against Progressive Conservative incumbent Jim Edwards.

== Manitoba ==
=== Winnipeg South: Jim Weidman ===
Weidman received 168 votes, finishing fifth against Progressive Conservative candidate Dorothy Dobbie.

== Ontario ==
=== Kingston and the Islands: John Hayes ===
Hayes was a civil engineer in Peterborough, and was fifty years old at the time of the election. He graduated from Kingston Collegiate and Vocational Institute and Queen's University in Kingston.

He was a perennial candidate for the Libertarian Party of Canada and the Libertarian Party of Ontario. In 1984, he led a four-day libertarian convention at Trent University (Globe and Mail, 21 May 1984). His wife Sally Hayes and son John Scott Hayes have been candidates of the Libertarian Party (Kingston Whig-Standard, 19 November 1988).

He allowed his name to stand in the 1988 election for Kingston when no local candidate came forward, and acknowledged that he would not be able to campaign actively in the riding. He said, "Think of it as kind of the Chilean factor, if people want to say no to the powers-that-be. I let my name stand so people will have a choice if they want one and they don't want to continue voting for any of the major socialist parties that we have in the country." (Kingston Whig-Standard, 25 October 1988). (The "Chilean factor" comment refers to the 1988 referendum in that country that brought an end to Augusto Pinochet's military dictatorship.)

Hayes supported "total free-trade" in the 1988 election, and was skeptical that the Canada-U.S. Free Trade Agreement negotiated by the government of Brian Mulroney did not go far enough. He predicted he would receive between 200 and 500 votes, and received 301 (KWS, 23 November 1988).

Electoral record
Election	Division	Party	Votes	%	Place	Winner
1977 provincial	Peterborough	Libertarian	341		4/4	John Turner, Progressive Conservative
1979 federal	Peterborough	Libertarian	787		4/6	Bill Domm, Progressive Conservative
1980 federal	Victoria—Haliburton	Libertarian	367		4/4	Bill Scott, Progressive Conservative
1981 provincial	Peterborough	Libertarian	787	2.0	4/6	John Turner, Progressive Conservative
1984 federal	Peterborough	Libertarian	1,479	2.9	4/6	Bill Domm, Progressive Conservative
1988 federal	Kingston and the Islands	Libertarian	301	0.5	5/5	Peter Milliken, Liberal

=== Scarborough Centre: Dusan Kubias ===
Kubias was a quality-control inspector for an engineering firm in the 1980s, and ran for the federal and provincial Libertarian parties on four occasions. He also ran for the leadership of the federal party in 1987, but lost to Dennis Corrigan. During the 1987 provincial election, he said that he would abolish taxes and dramatically reduce the size of government. Kubias was twenty-four years old in 1987.

Electoral record
Election	Division	Party	Votes	%	Place	Winner
1984 federal	York West	Libertarian	335		4/7	Sergio Marchi, Liberal
1985 provincial	York South	Libertarian	343	1.1	6/6	Bob Rae, New Democratic Party
1987 provincial	York South	Libertarian	411	1.5	4/4	Bob Rae, New Democratic Party
1988 federal	Scarborough Centre	Libertarian	342		4/4	Pauline Browes, Progressive Conservative

=== Scarborough West: Anna Young ===
Young was a self-employed advertising consultant at the time of the election, and spoke of eliminating "our growing dependence on government and its bureaucrats" (Toronto Star, 18 November 1988). She received 459 votes (1.1%), finishing fourth against Liberal candidate Tom Wappel.

== Quebec ==
Neal Ford: Neal Ford was a 23-year-old student when he ran for the Libertarian Party of Canada in the 1988 Canadian General election in the riding of Lachine-Lac St. Louis. He campaigned under the banner of "Lower Taxes and Less Government" and leaned toward Ayn Rand's philosophy of objectivism. On a shoestring budget, he managed to run a highly visible campaign calling for a vast reduction in the size and scope of government, reduction of the deficit and national debt in part by cutting government programs and spending drastically and selling off crown corporations and land, and with it ending costly government red tape which impeded entrepreneurship, and reducing taxes to a point where they could sustain the only valid federal government functions, namely maintaining an armed forces to protect us from invasion from without, and a system of objective laws and courts to prosecute crimes where violence force and fraud were involved and to arbitrates where private means of arbitration failed, and a police system to protect citizens from force and fraud and enforce objective laws. He maintained a pro-life stance, believing that all rights are rooted in the sanctity of the right to life, which begins at conception and continued until natural death and that all rights stand or fall on that right, which may not be deprived of any individual except in self defense. He opposed Capital Punishment. The 1988 election alsocentered around the Mulroney Free Trade deal with the US, which in Ford's view, did not go far enough. He finished 5th in a field of 7 with 325 votes.

== Saskatchewan ==
=== Regina-Wascana: Ian Christopher Madsen ===
Madsen was an investment portfolio manager. He received 65 votes (less than 0.1%), finishing fifth and last against Larry Schneider.

Electoral record
Election	Division	Party	Votes	%	Place	Winner
1988 federal	Regina—Wascana	Libertarian	65	0.1%	5/5	Larry Schneider, Progressive Conservative
