= Joseph Price (politician) =

Canadian politician

Member of Parliament for Burin—St. George's
- In office 1984–1988
- Preceded by: Roger Simmons
- Succeeded by: Roger Simmons

Personal details
- Born: 5 May 1945 (age 81) Brunette Island, Newfoundland
- Party: Progressive Conservative
- Profession: educator

Joseph Price (born 5 May 1945 in Brunette Island) is a Canadian politician who was a Progressive Conservative party member of the House of Commons of Canada. He was an educational administrator and teacher by career.

He was elected at Newfoundland's Burin—St. George's electoral district in the 1984 federal election, thus he served in the 33rd Canadian Parliament. On 11 November 1984, he was appointed Parliamentary Secretary to the Minister of Labour, a position he served in until the end of his term in office. In the 1988 federal election, he was defeated by Roger Simmons of the Liberal party and left national politics.
