= Independent candidates in the 1988 Canadian federal election =

There were several independent candidates in the 1988 Canadian federal election, none of whom were elected. Information about these candidates may be found on this page.

== Manitoba ==
=== Gerry West Winnipeg—Transcona ===
West was a sales representative. He received 156 votes (0.37%), finishing fifth against New Democratic Party incumbent Bill Blaikie.

=== Rik Gates, Annapolis Valley-Hant ===
Gates was a student at Acadia University. He received 200 votes (0.43%), finishing fifth against Progressive Conservative Party of Canada incumbent Pat Nowlan.
