= Libertarian Party of Canada =

Federal political party

Libertarian Party of Canada Parti libertarien du Canada
- Leader: Derek Elliott
- President: Coreen Corcoran
- Deputy Leader: Michael Harris
- Founder: Marshall Bruce Evoy
- Founded: 7 July 1973; 53 years ago
- Headquarters: 409–207 Bank St. Ottawa, Ontario
- Ideology: Libertarianism; Classical liberalism; Right-libertarianism
- International affiliation: Interlibertarians; International Alliance of Libertarian Parties
- Colours: Yellow
- Senate: 0 / 105
- House of Commons: 0 / 343

Website
- www.libertarian.ca

The Libertarian Party of Canada (French: Parti libertarien du Canada) was a federal political party in Canada founded in 1973. It was involuntarily deregistered in March 2026.

== History ==
The party was founded in July 1973 by Marshall Bruce Evoy. The party's founding convention, attended by 64 delegates and modeled on the 1972 Founding Convention of the United States Libertarian Party and the Libertarian Alternative of Alberta's September 1973 rally in Edmonton, took place in Toronto in October 1973; Sieg Pedde was elected leader. Evoy ran unsuccessfully for election to Parliament in the 1974 federal election in a Toronto riding.

The party achieved registered status in the 1979 federal election by running more than fifty candidates. The party spent $45,818 on the 1984 Canadian federal election running 72 candidates and received 0.2% of the vote.

Stanisław Tymiński, who was briefly the party's leader from 1990 to 1991, ran for President of Poland in the 1990 and 1995 elections.

Tim Moen (/ˈmoʊən/) became the party's leader in May 2014, succeeding Katrina Chowne.

In the 2015 Canadian federal election, Lauren Southern was the Libertarian candidate in the district of Langley–Aldergrove. She was briefly removed by the party as a candidate but was reinstated with support from Breitbart News and Rebel Media. She received 535 votes, or 0.9% of the total.

In September 2018, Moen, who had previously offered the leadership of the Libertarian Party to Maxime Bernier, stated that he was open to the idea of a merger with Bernier's People's Party of Canada. When asked by Global News, Bernier indicated he had no interest in a merger.

Jacques Boudreau succeeded Moen as the party's leader in August 2021. The party was deregistered on March 31, 2026, though announced its National Convention, which was held in May 2026.

On May 3, 2026, Derek Elliott became the new leader of the party.

On October 28th, 2026 the deputy leader of the party Michael Harris announced that the party would remain deregistered for the time being, while continuing its efforts to regain registered status.

== Ideology ==
The party subscribes to libertarian and classical liberal tenets; its stated mission is to reduce the size, scope, and cost of government. Having stated that the party "wouldn't criminalize much except murder and theft", policies include ending drug prohibition, ending government censorship, open borders, lowering taxes, protecting gun rights, legalising sex work, free trade and non-interventionism.

The statement of principles adopted by the founding convention in 1973 called for a new Canadian Constitution to supersede the British North America Act and for privatization of the Canadian Broadcasting Corporation and the Royal Mail Canada through their sale. No consensus could be reached at the time on age of majority, capital punishment and abortion.

== Election results ==
| Election | Leader | Candidates | Votes | Share of popular vote | Share in ridings contested |
|---|---|---|---|---|---|
| 1979 | Alex Eaglesham | 60 / 282 | 16,042 | 0.1% | 0.6% |
| 1980 | Vacant | 58 / 282 | 14,656 | 0.1% | 0.6% |
| 1984 | Victor Levis | 72 / 282 | 23,514 | 0.2% | 0.7% |
| 1988 | Dennis Corrigan | 88 / 295 | 33,185 | 0.3% | 0.8% |
| 1993 | Hilliard Cox | 52 / 295 | 14,630 | 0.1% | 0.5% |
| 1997 | did not contest | | | | |
| 2000 | did not contest | | | | |
| 2004 | Jean-Serge Brisson | 8 / 308 | 1,949 | nil% | 0.5% |
| 2006 | Jean-Serge Brisson | 10 / 308 | 3,002 | nil% | 0.6% |
| 2008 | Dennis Young | 26 / 308 | 7,300 | 0.1% | 0.6% |
| 2011 | Dennis Young | 23 / 308 | 6,002 | nil% | 0.5% |
| 2015 | Tim Moen | 72 / 338 | 37,407 | 0.2% | 0.9% |
| 2019 | Tim Moen | 24 / 338 | 8,281 | 0.1% | 0.6% |
| 2021 | Jacques Boudreau | 13 / 338 | 4,765 | nil% | 0.7% |
| 2025 | Jacques Boudreau | 16 / 338 | 5,561 | nil% | 0.6 |

== Leaders ==
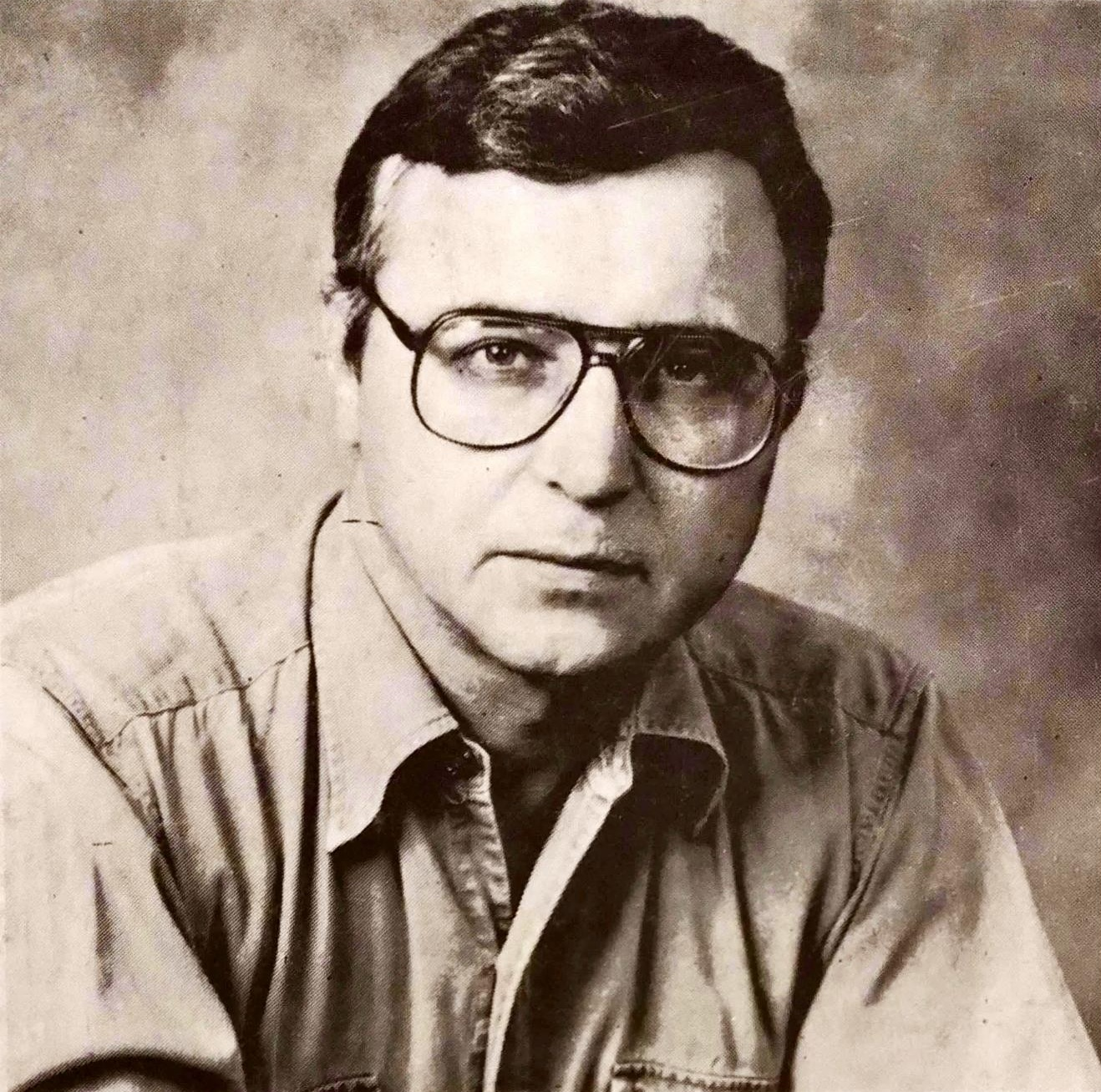
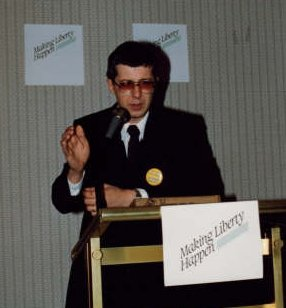
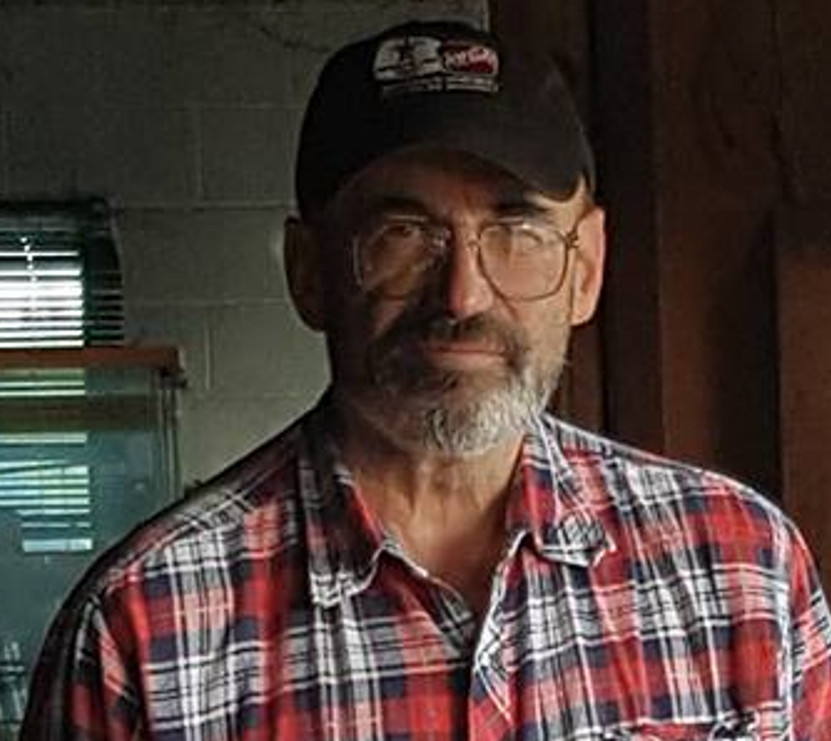
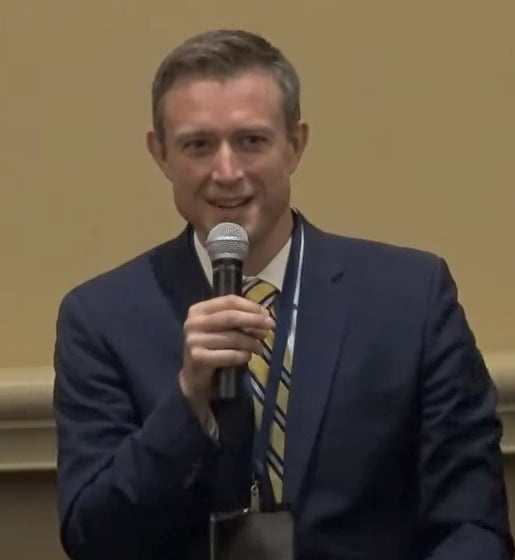
Top row: Stanisław Tymiński (left) and George Dance (right); bottom row: Jean-Serge Brisson (left) and Tim Moen (right)

| No. | Leader | Years in office |
|---|---|---|
| 1 | Sieg Pedde | 1973–1974 |
| 2 | Charles "Chuck" Lyall | 1974–1976 |
| 3 | Ron Bailey | 1976–1978 |
| 4 | Alex Eaglesham | 1978–1979 |
| 5 | Linda Cain | 1980–1982 |
| 6 | Neil Reynolds | May 1982 – 1983 |
| 7 | Victor Levis | 1983–1987 |
| 8 | Dennis Corrigan | 1987–1990 |
| 9 | Stanisław Tymiński | 1990–1991 |
| 10 | George Dance | 1991–1993 |
| 11 | Hilliard Cox | May 1993 – 1995 |
| (10) | George Dance | 1995–1996 |
| 12 | Vincent Pouliot | 12 May 1996 – 5 April 1997 |
| 13 | Robert Morse | 6 April 1997–1999 |
| 14 | Jean-Serge Brisson | 1999 – 18 May 2008 (Note: Acting leader from 1999–2000.) |
| 15 | Dennis Young | 18 May 2008 – May 2011 |
| 16 | Katrina Chowne | May 2011 – 11 May 2014 |
| 17 | Tim Moen | 12 May 2014 – 15 August 2021 |
| 18 | Jacques Boudreau | 15 August 2021 – 3 May 2026 |
| 19 | Derek Elliott | 3 May 2026 – present |

== See also ==
- Libertarian Party of Canada candidates in the 1988 Canadian federal election
- Libertarian Party of Canada candidates in the 1993 Canadian federal election
- Libertarian Party of Canada candidates in the 2006 Canadian federal election
- Libertarian Party of Canada candidates in the 2008 Canadian federal election
- Libertarian Party of Canada candidates in the 2011 Canadian federal election
- Libertarian Party of Canada candidates in the 2015 Canadian federal election
