= Phillip Forsey =

Canadian educator and politician

MHA for Burin
- In office 1949–1956
- Preceded by: Office Established
- Succeeded by: Eric S. Jones

Minister of Health
- In office December 23, 1952 – July 5, 1956
- Preceded by: James Chalker
- Succeeded by: James M. McGrath

Minister of Home Affairs and Minister of Supply
- In office April 9, 1949 – December 23, 1952
- Preceded by: Office Established
- Succeeded by: Office Abolished

Personal details
- Born: December 12, 1912
- Died: February 9, 1965 (aged 52)

Phillip Samuel Forsey (December 12, 1912 – February 9, 1965) was an educator and politician in Newfoundland. He represented Burin in the Newfoundland House of Assembly from 1949 to 1956.

The son of Aaron D. and Maude Forsey, he was born in Grand Bank and was educated there, at Memorial University College and at Mount Allison University. Forsey taught school for 17 years, resigning in 1949 to devote himself to politics. He had been defeated in his bid to represent St. John's West in the National Convention in 1946. Forsey then campaigned on the Burin Peninsula and in Fortune Bay in support of confederation with Canada. He served as Minister of Home Affairs in the interim administration formed by Joey Smallwood following union with Canada. Forsey was elected to the Newfoundland assembly in 1949. He served in the provincial cabinet as Minister of Supply and later as Minister of Health. He resigned from cabinet in 1954. Forsey moved to Ottawa in 1957 and taught high school there until his death in 1965.

Forsey married Doris N. Cobb in 1935; the couple had six children.
