= Roger Simmons =

Canadian politician (born 1939)

Roger Cyril Simmons, PC (born June 3, 1939) is a Canadian public policy consultant and former politician and diplomat.

Simmons is originally from Newfoundland and Labrador, where he was a politician for many years. He was later based at the Vancouver, British Columbia office of the Gowlings law firm.

The son of Willis Simmons and Ida Williams, he was born in Lewisporte, Newfoundland. After studying at the Salvation Army College for Officers, Memorial University of Newfoundland, and Boston University, Simmons became a teacher in Newfoundland's Salvation Army school system. (At the time, the Salvation Army, along with other denominations, ran its own publicly funded schools.) He subsequently moved to Springdale to become principal of Grant Collegiate and superintendent of the Green Bay Integrated School Board.

Simmons married Miriam Jean Torgerson.

He became president of the Newfoundland Teachers' Association in 1968 but resigned to run unsuccessfully for the leadership of the Newfoundland Liberal party.

In 1973, he was elected Liberal member of the House of Assembly (MHA) for Hermitage. He was re-elected in 1975 as MHA for Burgeo-Bay D'Espoir.

In 1979, he resigned his provincial seat and was elected to the House of Commons of Canada in the that year's federal election as the Liberal Member of Parliament for Burin—St. George's.

Following the 1980 election, Simmons became parliamentary secretary to the minister of the environment, and then parliamentary secretary to the minister of state for science and technology. On August 12, 1983, he was named to the Cabinet of Pierre Trudeau as minister of state for mines. He resigned eleven days later after learning that he was being investigated by the Royal Canadian Mounted Police on an allegation that he failed to pay income tax on some of his earnings. Simmons thereby set the record for the shortest federal Cabinet career in Canadian history. Simmons lost his seat in the 1984 election.

In 1985, Simmons returned to the Newfoundland House of Assembly as the Liberal MHA for Fortune-Hermitage and briefly served as interim Leader of the Opposition.

Simmons returned to the federal House of Commons in the 1988 federal election. He represented Canada at the Rio Summit in 1992. Simmons was re-elected in the 1993 election, and defeated in the 1997 election by Progressive Conservative candidate Bill Matthews.

Simmons was appointed Consul General for Canada in Seattle in 1998 and served in that position for five years before moving to Vancouver and joining Gowlings.

Parliament of Canada
Preceded by Don Jamieson, Liberal	Member of Parliament from Burin—St. George's; 1979–1984	Succeeded by Joe Price, Prog. Cons.
Preceded by Joe Price, Prog. Cons.	Member of Parliament from Burin—St. George's; 1988–1997	Succeeded by Bill Matthews, Prog. Cons.
