= Progressive Conservative Party of Canada candidates in the 1988 Canadian federal election =

Canadian federal election candidate list

The Progressive Conservative Party of Canada ran a full slate of 295 candidates in the 1988 federal election, and won 169 seats for a second consecutive majority governments. Many of the party's candidates have their own biography pages; information about others may be found here.

== Ontario ==
=== Richard Berthiaume (Nickel Belt) ===
Richard Berthiaume described himself as a fuel oil dealer. He supported official bilingualism, and described the anti-French Confederation of Regions Party as having tapped into "an undercurrent" he had not realized existed. He received 8,080 votes (20.75%), finishing third against New Democratic Party incumbent John Rodriguez.

=== Bob Fera (Sudbury) ===
Bob Fera is a former educator, and at one time served as principal of the largest separate school in Sudbury. He was an alderman and regional councillor before running for the House of Commons, and also served as Deputy Mayor in the mid-1980s. He opposed Sudbury's move to market value assessment for property taxes in 1986, following significant rate increases throughout his ward. He moved a successful motion against Sunday shopping two years later, and was quoted as saying "this community is not ready to trade in its prayer cards for VISA cards".

Many believed that Fera was a New Democrat, and his decision to run for the Progressive Conservatives was greeted with surprise in some circles. Fera argued that the PCs were likely to win the election, and that Sudbury would benefit from having a member on the government side. He received 9,356 votes (21.99%), finishing third against Liberal candidate Diane Marleau.

Fera became chairman of the board of the Manitoulin-Sudbury Community Care Access Centre in 1996, and served as chair of the Ontario Association of Community Care Access Centres for a time. He criticized the provincial government of Mike Harris for its approach to home care in 1998, but welcomed the government's infusion of new money to the industry the following year. In November 1999, the Harris government appointed him to a provincial Round Table on Elder Abuse. Two years later, however, Fera argued that renewed government cuts in his sector were jeopardizing the service. His centre was forced to introduce severe cutbacks that same year, which Fera blamed on provincial underfunding. FHe later indicated that he was prepared to introduce user fees to prevent further cuts.

Fera resigned his position in November 2001, in protest against the Harris government's efforts to restructure the province's Community Care Access Centres (the government had introduced legislation giving the province the right to appoint boards of directors and chief administrative officers). The board rejected his resignation, and he stayed to lead a province-wide protest against the proposed legislation. The legislation was nonetheless passed, and the Harris government dissolved the centre's board in February 2002.

Just before the board's dissolution, Fera sharply criticized the Harris government for firing its executive director, Bob Knight. Knight had previously criticized funding shortfalls, and Fera described his dismissal as "a vendetta by the government to silence the opposition to the lack of funding in the home-care sector".
