= Leonard G. Johnson =

American inventor (born 1953)

- Johnson with his Cozy MKIV
- Born: June 24, 1953 (age 73); St. Charles, Missouri, U.S.
- Education: California State University (BS)
- Occupations: Inventor; entrepreneur

Leonard G. (Len) Johnson (born June 24, 1953) is an American inventor and entrepreneur who developed and patented a plan that may impact the world's petroleum economy and provide a solution to global energy demands. Johnson's patent combines technologies such as desalinization, pipelining, algae farming, and fuel production. In 2008, Johnson completed the United States' first pure biofuel transcontinental flight using bio-butanol in an experimental airplane he personally built. Bio-butanol can be engineered from algae, and may be used as a replacement fuel for turbines as well as reciprocating engines. Johnson was presented with an award by the First Flight Foundation at the base of the Wright Brothers Monument to signify his achievement.

== Early life ==
Len Johnson was born in St. Charles, Missouri, in 1953. In elementary school, young Johnson's creative and reading abilities were noticed by his teachers. He left high school at age 16 and enrolled in college. Johnson's education was repeatedly disrupted when his father suffered two heart attacks, each of which caused him to leave college to run the family business. When his father's business lost essential commercial frontage due to a highway project and was sold to an older brother, Johnson joined the U.S. Navy in April 1975. In 1977 while still in the Navy Johnson became a member of American Mensa. Johnson achieved the rank of Petty Officer First Class before leaving the Navy.

As an employee of Hughes Aircraft Ground Systems Group, Johnson was named a Hughes Scholar and attended California State University where he graduated in 1985 with a B.S. degree majoring in Computer Science and a minor in Math.

== Early career ==
Johnson's first project at Hughes Aircraft Ground Systems Group was chosen as the Cost Improvement Proposal (CIP) of the year in 1983. This led to his being named as a Hughes Scholar. Upon graduation Johnson continued his career at Hughes as a software engineer and Member of the Technical Staff (MTS).

Johnson left Hughes in 1977 and worked as a consultant for Locus Computing Corporation, Braintec, Advantis, and Intel. His later software work included helping to implement backbone internet protocols for IBM Global Networks. Johnson also worked with Oracle Corporation where he was credited with helping to simplify installation of Oracle Applications on Windows computers. This enabled Oracle to expand sales in the middle market.

== Recent work ==
In 2006 Johnson founded THH, Inc. to research and develop biofuel technologies. THH filed for patent protection for one of Johnson's ideas called "Method of Distributing Desalination Functions While Reducing the Environmental Impact of Industrial Cooling Water and the Introduction of Brine to Brackish or Saline Water Sources" US Patent Application No. 20090090676

== Historic cross-country biofuel flight ==
Over his desk, Johnson displays a placard with Charles F. Kettering's famous quote: "The Wright Brothers flew right through the smoke screen of impossibility." As a small boy, Johnson listened to tower communications coming all the way from Lambert Airport in St. Louis on an old, upright cabinet radio next to the pot-bellied stove in Oberly’s General Store, a

Len Johnson and John Harris (President, First Flight Foundation) at the site of the historic Wright Brothers telegram following First Flight

picturesque establishment owned and operated by an elderly couple who were long-time residents of Weldon Spring. MO. Their store sat across the road from the headwater of Weldon Spring, where people once drove their wagons to draw water.

Johnson dreamed of building his own airplane, which led him to compare the various kit and plans-built airplanes available. Johnson chose to build a Cozy MKIV, taking over the project started by another builder in Maine. The project had a number of Aerocanard parts, but was registered as a Cozy MKIV by Johnson upon completion. He flew it for the first time in Chino, CA in 2002.

On October 25, 2008, Johnson took off from Chino field in his Cozy Mark IV aircraft. Johnson had just completed a four-month process of adapting and proving the aircraft for use with bio-butanol. Johnson's aim was to prove the unconventional fuel as an alternative to the 100LL aviation fuel burned by most light aircraft. The latter is a kind of gasoline that remains one of the few that are still leaded for reasons having to do with the engine technology these aircraft use. Johnson sought to demonstrate that an ecologically sound alternative existed. After taking off, Johnson first turned west towards the Pacific Ocean, and then east for the flight to Kitty Hawk. Along the way he stopped in New Mexico, Texas, Arkansas, and Tennessee. In both Arkansas and Tennessee, a partial engine tear down was performed to deal with a persistent cylinder heating problem and to prove that the fuel was not the culprit. On November 2, 2008, he touched down at North Carolina's First Flight Airport in Kitty Hawk, where he was met by a reception committee headed by the officers of the First Flight Foundation. Johnson was presented with a replica of the Wright Brothers Memorial to commemorate his achievement in being the first to cross the continent using bio-butanol, and in proving that an environmentally sound alternative to 100LL existed.

During his return flight, Johnson encountered a weather-related emergency and had to perform a forced landing at Osceola, Missouri. Upon landing on the airport's taxiway, Johnson found himself headed right for a house. He steered into a power pole in order to sheer off a wing and dissipate speed, and ended up upside down in a ditch having lost both wings, half the canard, and the nose of the aircraft. Johnson suffered severe injuries including a broken neck and back. After being flown by helicopter to a local hospital, Johnson was listed in critical condition. Johnson made a miraculous recovery after a prognosis that indicated he may be paralyzed; unable to walk, move his arms, or even breathe on his own.

== Current activities ==
Johnson is now rehabilitating at the VA Spinal Cord Injury (SCI) center in Long Beach, California, where he is learning to SCUBA dive with the Handicapped Scuba Association (HSA). Johnson recently appeared in an NBC Los Angeles channel 4 news segment with Vikki Vargas on stem cell research.

== Links ==
- THH, Inc’s official site
- "Johnson Completes Transcontinental Biofuel Flight". EAA. November 6, 2008. Archived from the original on December 14, 2010.
- "EAAer's Transcontinental Biofuel Flight Underway". EAA. October 30, 2008. Archived from the original on July 3, 2010.
- Susanne Retka Schill (November 3, 2008). "Biofuels developer uses biobutanol for trans-America flight". Ethanol Producer Magazine.
- http://suburbanjournals.stltoday.com/articles/2008/11/08/stcharles/news/1109stc-pokin0.txt
