= Libertarian Party of Canada candidates in the 2008 Canadian federal election =

Listing of candidates

The Libertarian Party of Canada fielded 26 candidates in the 2008 federal election, none of whom were elected. A list of these candidates may be found here.

== Alberta ==
=== Calgary Centre–North ===
- Jason McNeil

=== Calgary Southwest ===
- Dennis Young, Party leader

=== Peace River ===
- Melanie Simard

=== Wild Rose ===
- Krista Zoobkoff

== British Columbia ==
=== Burnaby – New Westminster ===
- Ismet Yetisen

=== New Westminster – Coquitlam ===
- Lewis Dahlby

=== North Vancouver ===
- Tunya Audain

=== Pitt Meadows – Maple Ridge – Mission ===
- Jeff Monds

=== Port Moody – Westwood – Port Coquitlam ===
- Rob Gillespie

=== Saanich – Gulf Islands ===
- Dale Leier

=== Surrey North ===
- Alex Joehl

=== Vancouver Centre ===
- John Clarke

=== Vancouver Kingsway ===
- Matt Kadioglu

=== Vancouver Quadra ===
- Norris Barens

== Ontario ==
=== Ajax – Pickering ===
- Stephanie Wilson

=== Barrie ===
- Paolo Fabrizio

=== Guelph ===
- Phil Bender

=== Hamilton Centre ===
- Anthony Giles

=== Kitchener – Waterloo ===
- Jason Cousineau

=== London North Centre ===
- Trevor Murray

=== Markham – Unionville ===
- Allen Small

=== Ottawa South ===
- Jean-Serge Brisson, former Party leader

=== Scarborough – Rouge River ===
- Alan Mercer

=== Simcoe – Grey ===
- Caley McKibben

=== St. Paul's ===
- John Kittredge

=== Trinity – Spadina ===
- Chester Brown

== Saskatchewan ==
=== Saskatoon – Rosetown – Biggar ===
- Kevin Stricker
