= Don Jamieson (politician) =

Canadian politician and diplomat

The Honourable Donald Jamieson PC
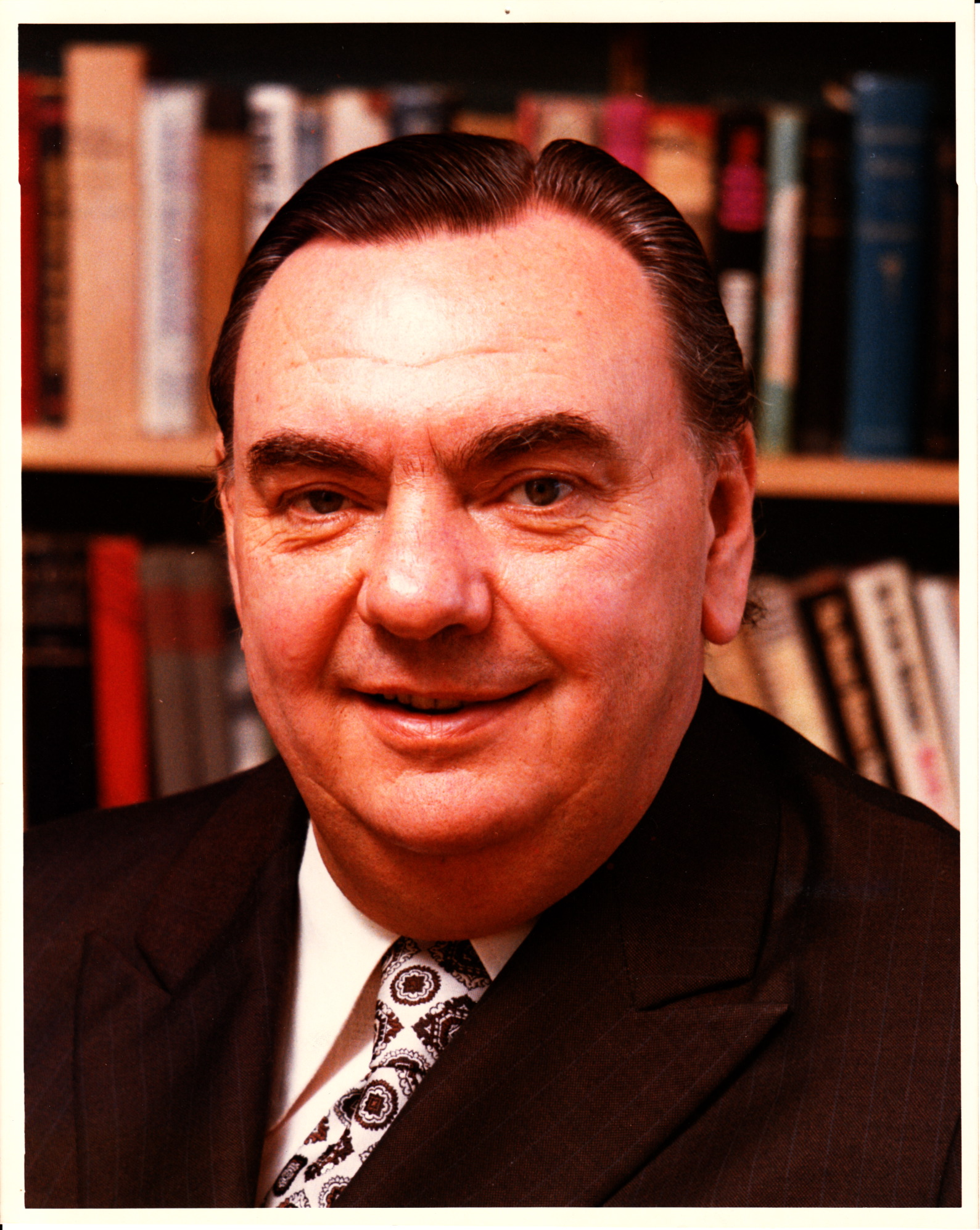

Secretary of State for External Affairs
- In office September 14, 1976 – June 3, 1979
- Prime Minister: Pierre Trudeau
- Preceded by: Allan MacEachen
- Succeeded by: Flora MacDonald

Leader of the Newfoundland and Labrador Liberal Party
- In office June 18, 1979 – January 1, 1980
- Preceded by: Bill Rowe
- Succeeded by: Len Stirling

Member of Parliament for Burin—St. George's
- In office May 22, 1979 – June 18, 1979
- Preceded by: Riding created
- Succeeded by: Roger Simmons

Member of Parliament for Burin-Burgeo
- In office September 19, 1966 – May 21, 1979
- Preceded by: Chesley William Carter
- Succeeded by: Riding abolished

Personal details
- Born: April 30, 1921 St. John's, Newfoundland
- Died: November 19, 1986 (aged 65) Swift Current, Newfoundland and Labrador, Canada
- Party: Liberal
- Spouse: Barbara Oakley (m. 1946)
- Children: 4
- Occupation: Broadcaster

Donald Campbell Jamieson PC (April 30, 1921 – November 19, 1986) was a Canadian politician, diplomat and broadcaster.

Jamieson was born in St. John's, Newfoundland. His father was a newspaper editor, and his grandfather was a fisherman who settled in Newfoundland from Scotland.

== Early life and Confederation ==
He worked for Newfoundland's Department of Rural Reconstruction, as a bookkeeper, and as a sales manager for Coca-Cola before starting a career in broadcasting. He was Newfoundland's best known radio and television personality.

In 1945, he became the first Newfoundlander to sit in the press gallery of the Parliament of Canada, reporting on the negotiations that led to Canada inviting Newfoundland to join Canadian Confederation. During the two referendums on the question in 1948, Jamieson vehemently campaigned in opposition to Newfoundland joining Canada; instead, he favoured an economic union with the United States. The Party for Economic Union with the United States was led by Chesley Crosbie and Jamieson became known as "my father's voice" according to John Crosbie.

== Broadcasting ==
In 1951, he obtained a licence, in partnership with Geoff Stirling, for a new radio station in St. John's. He eventually established a private radio network in Newfoundland, and the island's first television station CJON-TV. While Stirling was heavily interested in the business aspect, Jamieson became known to Newfoundlanders as the host of the nightly News Cavalcade. The program featured a main news segment, weather and an extended interview that included guests from Howie Meeker to Joey Smallwood. He became president of the Canadian Association of Broadcasters in 1961, and remained in that position for four years. During his time as president Jamieson traveled the country extensively and also recorded daily 'minute-torials' that were 60 second long commentary broadcasts recorded at CJON which were nationally distributed via the CAB and subsequently syndicated across Canada. Jamieson was also involved in the transition of the Board of Broadcast Governors changing over to the Canadian Radio-television and Telecommunications Commission.

== Political life ==
Jamieson entered politics by successfully contesting a 1966 by-election as a candidate for the Liberal Party of Canada. He was re-elected in the 1968 election, and joined the Cabinet of Prime Minister Pierre Trudeau as Minister of Defence Production. In 1969, he became Minister of Transport retaining that portfolio until 1972 when he became Minister of Regional Economic Expansion. In 1976, he became Secretary of State for External Affairs.

He was re-elected in the 1979 election that brought down the Liberal government. Jamieson then moved to provincial politics, winning the leadership of the Newfoundland Liberal Party one month before the June 1979 provincial election. Jamieson's Liberals were defeated, and he resigned as provincial party leader in 1980.

In 1983, he was appointed Canada's High Commissioner to the United Kingdom, and served until 1985. "His fund of political anecdotes and Newfoundland stories made him a firm favourite with the Queen," - published in The Daily Telegraph in 1986.

He returned to Newfoundland to run his broadcasting interests before dying of a heart attack in 1986.

== Just Himself: the Don Jamieson Story ==
His grandson, Joshua Jamieson, produced, directed and wrote a documentary titled "Just Himself: The Story of Don Jamieson", which was developed over a three-year period and produced by Odd Sock Films Inc. in association with m0xY Productions. The documentary features interviews with Paul Martin, Joe Clark, William Rompkey, Mike Duffy, Richard Cashin, John Crosbie, Edward Roberts, Mary Hodder, Don Hollett, Scott Andrews, Scott Simms, Chris Dunn, Bill Callahan, Jim Furlong and Gerry Phelan. The film also includes insights from Jamieson's children: Heather Jamieson, Donna Jamieson Sittmann, Roger Jamieson and Debby Jamieson Winters as well as his brother's Bas Jamieson (longtime host of the Open Line program heard on VOCM) and Colin Jamieson. The film was shot in six locations that included St John's, Swift Current, Marystown, Burin, Ottawa and Montreal. It is narrated by Brian Tobin and set to air on NTV (CJON-DT) in the fall of 2011.

== Archives ==
There is a Donald Jamieson fonds at Library and Archives Canada.

Parliament of Canada
Preceded by Chesley William Carter	Member of Parliament from Burin—Burgeo; 1966–1979	Succeeded by The electoral district was abolished in 1976.
Preceded by The electoral district was created in 1976.	Member of Parliament from Burin—St. George's; 1979	Succeeded by Roger Simmons
Political offices
Preceded by Charles Mills Drury	Minister of Defence Production; 1968–1969	Succeeded by The office of Minister of Defence Production was abolished.
Preceded by The office of Minister of Supply and Services was created in 1969.	Minister of Supply and Services; 1969	Succeeded by James Armstrong Richardson
Preceded by Jean Marchand	Minister of Regional Economic Expansion; 1972–1975	Succeeded by Marcel Lessard
Preceded by Alastair Gillespie	Minister of Industry, Trade and Commerce; 1975–1976	Succeeded by Joseph Jacques Jean Chrétien
Preceded by Allan MacEachen	Secretary of State for External Affairs; 1976–1979	Succeeded by Flora MacDonald
Diplomatic posts
Preceded by Jean Casselman Wadds	Canadian High Commissioner to the United Kingdom; 1983–1985	Succeeded by Roy McMurtry
