= Burin—St. George's =

Former federal electoral district in Newfoundland and Labrador, Canada

Newfoundland and Labrador electoral district

Defunct federal electoral district
- Legislature: House of Commons
- District created: 1976
- District abolished: 2003
- First contested: 1979
- Last contested: 2004

Burin—St. George's was a federal electoral district in Newfoundland and Labrador, Canada, that was represented in the House of Commons of Canada from 1979 to 2004. This riding was created in 1976 from parts of Burin—Burgeo, Humber—St. George's—St. Barbe ridings.

It was abolished in 2003 when it was merged into Random—Burin—St. George's.

== Members of Parliament ==
Parliament	Years	Member	Party
Riding created from Burin—Burgeo and Humber—St. George's—St. Barbe
31st	1979–1979	Don Jamieson	Liberal
31st	1979–1980	Roger Simmons	Liberal
32nd	1980–1984	Roger Simmons	Liberal
33rd	1984–1988	Joseph Price	Progressive Conservative
34th	1988–1993	Roger Simmons	Liberal
35th	1993–1997	Roger Simmons	Liberal
36th	1997–2000	Bill Matthews	Progressive Conservative
37th	2000–2004	Bill Matthews	Liberal
Riding dissolved into Random—Burin—St. George's

== Election results ==
1979 Canadian federal election
Party	Candidate	Votes
Liberal	Don Jamieson	14,960
New Democratic	Ross Senior	3,943
Progressive Conservative	Allen Evans	2,366

Canadian federal by-election, September 19, 1979 Resignation of Don Jamieson
Party	Candidate	Votes
Liberal	Roger Simmons	10,434
New Democratic	Dave Mackinnon	4,587
Progressive Conservative	Walter Carter	4,308

1980 Canadian federal election
Party	Candidate	Votes
Liberal	Roger Simmons	14,979
Progressive Conservative	James Oxford	3,522
New Democratic	Peter Fenwick	2,929

1984 Canadian federal election
Party	Candidate	Votes
Progressive Conservative	Joe Price	13,184
Liberal	Roger Simmons	12,885
New Democratic	L. Joseph Edwards	1,767

1988 Canadian federal election
Party	Candidate	Votes
Liberal	Roger Simmons	18,527
Progressive Conservative	Joe Price	17,488
New Democratic	L. Joseph Edwards	2,299

1993 Canadian federal election
Party	Candidate	Votes
Liberal	Roger Simmons	24,600
Progressive Conservative	Paul A. Gallant	4,935
New Democratic	Mark Noseworthy	757
Natural Law	Michael Rendell	418

1997 Canadian federal election
Party	Candidate	Votes
Progressive Conservative	Bill Matthews	13,884
Liberal	Roger Simmons	11,715
New Democratic	David A. Sullivan	4,784

2000 Canadian federal election
Party	Candidate	Votes
Liberal	Bill Matthews	14,603
Independent	Sam Synard	7,891
Progressive Conservative	Fred Pottle	5,799
Alliance	Peter Fenwick	1,511
New Democratic	David Sullivan	924

== See also ==
- List of Canadian electoral districts
- Historical federal electoral districts of Canada
