= Notre-Dame-de-Grâce (federal electoral district) =

Former federal electoral district in Quebec, Canada

Quebec electoral district

Defunct federal electoral district
- Legislature: House of Commons
- District created: 1947
- District abolished: 1996
- First contested: 1949
- Last contested: 1993

Notre-Dame-de-Grâce (French: [nɔtʁə dam də ɡʁɑs], locally [nɔtʁ̥œ̈ dam dœ̈ ɡʁɑːs]; also known as Notre-Dame-de-Grâce—Lachine East) was a federal electoral district in Quebec, Canada, that was represented in the House of Commons of Canada from 1949 to 1997.

This riding was created in 1947 from Mount Royal when that riding moved from being based in Notre-Dame-de-Grâce to the town Mount Royal. In 1980 its name was changed to "Notre-Dame-de-Grâce—Lachine East".

It was abolished in 1987 when it was redistributed into Lachine—Lac-Saint-Louis and a new Notre-Dame-de-Grâce riding.

The new Notre-Dame-de-Grâce riding was created from parts of Notre-Dame-de-Grâce—Lachine East, Mount Royal and Saint-Henri—Westmount ridings.

This riding consisted of:

- the towns of Saint-Pierre and Montréal-Ouest;
- that part of the Town of Montréal bounded as follows: commencing at the intersection of the northeasterly limit of the City of Côte-Saint-Luc and Queen Mary Road; thence, successively, the following lines and demarcations: Queen Mary Road; Circle Road Street to the right; Bridle Path Street; Bonavista Avenue; Côte-Saint-Luc Road; the limits of the Town of Westmount; Autoroute 20; Autoroute 15; the Lachine Canal; the limits of the towns of LaSalle, Montréal, Montréal-Ouest, Montréal, Hampstead; the limits of the city of Côte-Saint-Luc to the point of commencement.

The electoral district was abolished in 1996 when it was merged into Notre-Dame-de-Grâce—Lachine riding.

== Members of Parliament ==
This riding elected the following members of Parliament:

Parliament	Years	Member	Party
Notre-Dame-de-Grâce; Riding created from Mount Royal
21st	1949–1953	Frederick Primrose Whitman	Liberal
22nd	1953–1957	William McLean Hamilton	Progressive Conservative
23rd	1957–1958	William McLean Hamilton	Progressive Conservative
24th	1958–1962	William McLean Hamilton	Progressive Conservative
25th	1962–1963	Edmund Tobin Asselin	Liberal
26th	1963–1965	Edmund Tobin Asselin	Liberal
27th	1965–1968	Warren Allmand	Liberal
28th	1968–1972	Warren Allmand	Liberal
29th	1972–1974	Warren Allmand	Liberal
30th	1974–1979	Warren Allmand	Liberal
31st	1979–1980	Warren Allmand	Liberal
32nd	1980–1984	Warren Allmand	Liberal
Notre-Dame-de-Grâce—Lachine East
33rd	1984–1988	Warren Allmand	Liberal
Riding dissolved into Notre-Dame-de-Grâce and Lachine—Lac-Saint-Louis
Notre-Dame-de-Grâce; Riding created from Notre-Dame-de-Grâce—Lachine East, Mount Royal and Saint-Henri—Westmount
34th	1988–1993	Warren Allmand	Liberal
35th	1993–1997	Warren Allmand	Liberal
Riding dissolved into Notre-Dame-de-Grâce—Lachine

== Election results ==
=== Notre-Dame-de-Grâce, 1949–1984 ===
1949 Canadian federal election
Party	Candidate	Votes	%
Liberal	Frederick Primrose Whitman	19,469	63.18
Progressive Conservative	John Bower Theodore Lewis	10,293	33.40
Co-operative Commonwealth	Alfred Fossati	1,054	3.42
Total valid votes		30,816	

1953 Canadian federal election
Party	Candidate	Votes	%	±%
Progressive Conservative	William McLean Hamilton	16,690	49.91	+16.51
Liberal	Frederick Primrose Whitman	15,567	46.55	-16.63
Co-operative Commonwealth	Alan Dunlop Brown	1,184	3.54	+0.23
Total valid votes		33,441		
Progressive Conservative gain from Liberal		Swing		+16.57

1957 Canadian federal election
Party	Candidate	Votes	%	±%
Progressive Conservative	William McLean Hamilton	24,517	56.86	+6.95
Liberal	George Stuart Mooney	17,551	40.71	-5.85
Co-operative Commonwealth	J. Cyril Flanagan	1,049	2.43	-1.11
Total valid votes		43,117		
Progressive Conservative hold		Swing		+6.40

1958 Canadian federal election
Party	Candidate	Votes	%	±%
Progressive Conservative	William McLean Hamilton	27,145	60.53	+3.67
Liberal	Kenneth C. Mackay	16,172	36.06	-4.64
Co-operative Commonwealth	James Cyril Flanagan	1,526	3.40	+0.97
Total valid votes		44,843		
Progressive Conservative hold		Swing		+4.16

1962 Canadian federal election
Party	Candidate	Votes	%	±%
Liberal	Edmund Tobin Asselin	22,080	48.60	+12.53
Progressive Conservative	William McLean Hamilton	18,033	39.69	-20.84
New Democratic	C.G. Gifford	4,875	10.73	+7.33
Social Credit	Gérard Audet	446	0.98	
Total valid votes		45,434		
Liberal gain from Progressive Conservative		Swing		+16.69

1963 Canadian federal election
Party	Candidate	Votes	%	±%
Liberal	Edmund Tobin Asselin	30,532	64.50	+15.90
Progressive Conservative	W. Paschal Hayes	8,734	18.45	-21.24
New Democratic	C.G. Gifford	7,141	15.08	+4.35
Social Credit	Jean Clermont	932	1.97	+0.99
Total valid votes		47,339		
Liberal hold		Swing		+18.57

1965 Canadian federal election
Party	Candidate	Votes	%	±%
Liberal	Warren Allmand	17,796	41.13	-23.36
New Democratic	C.G. Gifford	14,071	32.52	+17.44
Progressive Conservative	Egan Chambers	10,935	25.27	+6.82
Ralliement créditiste	Adalbert Beaudoin	257	0.59	-1.37
Independent	Chester Sawczyszyn	206	0.48	
Total valid votes		43,265		
Liberal hold		Swing		-20.40

1968 Canadian federal election
Party	Candidate	Votes	%	±%
Liberal	Warren Allmand	25,959	73.03	+31.89
New Democratic	C.G. Gifford	7,123	20.04	-12.49
Progressive Conservative	Gordon Shaw	2,466	6.94	-18.34
Total valid votes		35,548		
Liberal hold		Swing		+22.19

1972 Canadian federal election
Party	Candidate	Votes	%	±%
Liberal	Warren Allmand	24,126	68.03	-5.00
Progressive Conservative	Walter Roustan	6,991	19.71	+12.78
New Democratic	Roland Morin	3,957	11.16	-8.88
Independent	Peter David Maguire	391	1.10	
Total valid votes		35,465		
Liberal hold		Swing		-8.89

1974 Canadian federal election
Party	Candidate	Votes	%	±%
Liberal	Warren Allmand	20,151	61.97	-6.05
Progressive Conservative	Walter Roustan	8,300	25.53	+5.81
New Democratic	Roland Morin	3,673	11.30	+0.14
Marxist–Leninist	Ian R. Hyman	391	1.20	
Total valid votes		32,515		
Liberal hold		Swing		-5.93

1979 Canadian federal election
Party	Candidate	Votes	%	±%
Liberal	Warren Allmand	33,011	72.42	+10.44
Progressive Conservative	Lou Miller	6,632	14.55	-10.98
New Democratic	Gus Callaghan	3,683	8.08	-3.22
Social Credit	Valères Rioux	1,316	2.89	
Rhinoceros	Michel St-Laurent	739	1.62	
Union populaire	Gilles Rainville	116	0.25	
Marxist–Leninist	Larry Tansey	88	0.19	-1.01
Total valid votes		45,585		
Liberal hold		Swing		+10.71

1980 Canadian federal election
Party	Candidate	Votes	%	±%
Liberal	Warren Allmand	27,604	71.16	-1.26
Progressive Conservative	Gordon S. Barker	5,691	14.67	+0.12
New Democratic	Grendon Haines	4,482	11.55	+3.47
Rhinoceros	Chérubin Guy Roy	900	2.32	+0.70
Marxist–Leninist	Robert Verrier	114	0.29	+0.10
Total valid votes		38,791		
Liberal hold		Swing		-0.69

=== Notre-Dame-de-Grâce—Lachine East, 1984–1988 ===
1984 Canadian federal election
Party	Candidate	Votes	%	±%
Liberal	Warren Allmand	17,910	43.43	-27.73
Progressive Conservative	Nick Auf der Maur	15,845	38.42	+23.75
New Democratic	Grendon Haines	5,772	14.00	+2.44
Rhinoceros	Don Blended 46 Years Mac Taggart (Note: actual name Donald Mactaggart)	1,007	2.44	+0.12
Parti nationaliste	René Cusson	564	1.37	
Commonwealth of Canada	Michel Corriveau	140	0.34	
Total valid votes		41,238		
Liberal hold		Swing		-25.74

=== Notre-Dame-de-Grâce, 1988–1997 ===
1988 Canadian federal election
Party	Candidate	Votes	%	±%
Liberal	Warren Allmand	22,928	54.57	+11.14
Progressive Conservative	Samir Chebeir	11,702	27.85	-10.57
New Democratic	Maria Peluso	5,154	12.27	-1.73
Green	Stephen A. Bruneau	848	2.02	
Rhinoceros	Al Feldman	678	1.61	-0.83
Christian Heritage	Robert Adams	356	0.85	
Libertarian	Earl Wertheimer	223	0.53	
Independent	Margaret Frain	80	0.19	
Commonwealth of Canada	Léon Plourde	45	0.11	-0.23
Total valid votes		42,014		
Liberal hold		Swing		+10.86

1993 Canadian federal election
Party	Candidate	Votes	%	±%
Liberal	Warren Allmand	28,646	70.72	+16.14
Bloc Québécois	Gilbert Ouellet	5,733	14.15	
Progressive Conservative	Maeve Quaid	2,618	6.46	-21.39
New Democratic	Bruce Toombs	1,416	3.50	-8.77
National	Shirley Demaine	661	1.63	
Independent	Don Donderi	518	1.28	
Natural Law	Michael E. Wilson	425	1.05	
Libertarian	Earl Wertheimer	222	0.55	+0.02
Independent	John Philips	155	0.38	
Abolitionist	Michael Windeyer	80	0.20	
Commonwealth of Canada	Alexander Shiroka	34	0.08	-0.02
Total valid votes		40,508		
Liberal hold		Swing		+1.00

== See also ==
- List of Canadian electoral districts
- Historical federal electoral districts of Canada
