= Alan MacNaughton =

Alan MacNaughton may refer to:

- Alan Macnaughton (1903–1999), Canadian politician
- Alan MacNaughtan (1920–2002), British television actor
