= Conservative Party of Canada candidates in the 2011 Canadian federal election =

Candidates representing the Conservative Party took part in the 2011 Canadian federal election. 166 of them won their seat, giving the party an overall majority in the House of Commons.

== Newfoundland and Labrador - 7 seats ==
Riding	Candidate's Name	Notes	Gender	Residence	Occupation	Votes	%	Rank
Avalon	Fabian Manning	Former MHA, MP, and Senator	M	St. Bride's	Politician			
Bonavista—Gander—Grand Falls—Windsor	Aaron Hynes		M					
Humber—St. Barbe—Baie Verte	Trevor Taylor	Former MHA	M		Politician, fisherman			
Labrador	Peter Penashue		M	Sheshatshiu	Former Innu leader			
Random—Burin—St. George's	John Ottenheimer	Former MHA	M		Politician			
St. John's East	Jerry Byrne	Acclaimed February 22, 2011	M		Businessman			
St. John's South—Mount Pearl	Loyola Sullivan	Former MHA	M		Politician			

== Prince Edward Island - 4 seats ==
Riding	Candidate's Name	Notes	Gender	Residence	Occupation	Votes	%	Rank
Cardigan	Michael Currie	Former MLA	M	Georgetown	Business manager			
Charlottetown	Donna Profit		F	Charlottetown	Educator			
Egmont	Gail Shea	Incumbent Member of Parliament, former MLA	F	Tignish	Former Civil Servant			
Malpeque	Tim Ogilvie		M	Spring Brook	Doctor			

== Nova Scotia - 11 seats ==
Riding	Candidate's Name	Notes	Gender	Residence	Occupation	Votes	%	Rank
Cape Breton—Canso	Clarence Derrick Kennedy		M					
Central Nova	Peter MacKay	Incumbent Member of Parliament	M	New Glasgow	Lawyer			
Cumberland—Colchester—Musquodoboit Valley	Scott Armstrong	Incumbent Member of Parliament	M	Truro	School principal			
Dartmouth—Cole Harbour	Wanda Webber	2008 Candidate	F	Dartmouth	Teacher			
Halifax	George Nikolaou		M					
Halifax West	Bruce Pretty		M	Prospect	Ophthalmologist			
Kings—Hants	David Morse	Former provincial cabinet minister	M	New Minas				
Sackville—Eastern Shore	Adam Mimnagh		M	Fall River	Small Business Owner			
South Shore—St. Margaret's	Gerald Keddy	Incumbent Member of Parliament	M	New Ross	Parliamentarian			
Sydney—Victoria	Cecil Clarke	Former provincial cabinet minister	M					
West Nova	Greg Kerr	Incumbent Member of Parliament	M	Granville Ferry	Retired Teacher			

== New Brunswick - 10 seats ==
Riding	Candidate's Name	Notes	Gender	Residence	Occupation	Votes	%	Rank
Acadie—Bathurst	Louis Robichaud	candidate	M					
Beauséjour	Evelyne Chapman	candidate	F					
Fredericton	Keith Ashfield	Incumbent Member of Parliament	M	Lincoln	Legislator			
Fundy Royal	Rob Moore	Incumbent Member of Parliament	M	Quispamsis	Parliamentarian			
Madawaska—Restigouche	Bernard Valcourt	Former MP and Cabinet Minister	M					
Miramichi	Tilly O'Neill-Gordon	Incumbent Member of Parliament	F	Miramichi	Teacher			
Moncton—Riverview—Dieppe	Robert Goguen	New Brunswick Progressive Conservative Party President	M	Moncton				
New Brunswick Southwest	John Williamson	Candidate	M					
Saint John	Rodney Weston	Incumbent Member of Parliament	M	Saint Martens	Manager			
Tobique—Mactaquac	Mike Allen	Incumbent Member of Parliament	M	Douglas	Parliamentarian			

== Quebec - 75 seats ==
Riding	Candidate's Name	Notes	Gender	Residence	Occupation	Votes	%	Rank
Abitibi—Baie-James—Nunavik—Eeyou	Jean-Maurice Matte		M					
Abitibi—Témiscamingue	Steven Herbet		M					
Ahuntsic	Constantin Kiryakidis		M		Lawyer			
Alfred-Pellan	Pierre Lefebvre		M					
Argenteuil—Papineau—Mirabel	Yvan Patry							
Bas-Richelieu—Nicolet—Bécancour	Charles Cartier	Cartier was born in 1950 and raised in Saint-Gérard-Majella. He has a background in surveying and engineering, and at the time of the election worked as an organic farmer.	M		Farmer	6,478	13.03	3/5
Beauce	Maxime Bernier	Incumbent Member of Parliament	M	Saint-Georges	Lawyer			
Beauharnois—Salaberry	David Couturier		M					
Beauport—Limoilou	Sylvie Boucher	Incumbent Member of Parliament	F	Quebec City	Parliamentarian			
Berthier—Maskinongé	Marie-Claude Godue	2006 and 2008 candidate in this riding	F	Saint-Léon-le-Grand	Businesswoman			
Bourassa	David Azoulay		M					
Brome—Missisquoi	Nolan Bauerle		M					
Brossard—La Prairie	Maurice Brossard	2008 candidate in this riding.	M	La Prairie	Reprocessor			
Chambly—Borduas	Nathalie Ferland Drolet		F					
Charlesbourg—Haute-Saint-Charles	Daniel Petit	Incumbent Member of Parliament	M	Quebec City	Lawyer and Parliamentarian			
Châteauguay—Saint-Constant	Andre Turcot							
Chicoutimi—Le Fjord	Carol Néron		F					
Compton—Stanstead	Sandrine Gressard Bélanger		F		Businesswoman			
Drummond	Normand W. Bernier		M					
Gaspésie—Îles-de-la-Madeleine	Régent Bastien	Former mayor of Paspébiac	M	Paspébiac	Teacher			
Gatineau	Jennifer Gearey		F					
Haute-Gaspésie—La Mitis—Matane—Matapédia	Allen Cormier		M					
Hochelaga	Audrey Castonguay		F					
Honoré-Mercier	Gérard Labelle		M					
Hull—Aylmer	Nancy Brassard-Fortin		F					
Jeanne-Le Ber	Pierre Lafontaine		M					
Joliette	Michel Morand		M					
Jonquière—Alma	Jean-Pierre Blackburn	Incumbent Member of Parliament	M	Jonquière	Parliamentarian			
La Pointe-de-l'Île	Mathieu Drolet		M					
Lac-Saint-Louis	Larry Smith	Former Canadian Senator representing Saurel, Quebec	M	Hudson	Former Canadian football player, businessman			
LaSalle—Émard	Chang-Tao Jimmy Yu		M					
Laurentides—Labelle	Guy Jonacs		M					
Laurier—Sainte-Marie	Charles K. Langford	2008 candidate in this riding	M	Montreal	Head of the ESF course at UQAM.			
Laval	Robert Malo		M					
Laval—Les Îles	Zaki Ghavitian		M					
Lévis—Bellechasse	Steven Blaney	Incumbent Member of Parliament	M	Saint-Rédempteur	Engineer			
Longueuil—Pierre-Boucher	Richard Bélisle		M					
Lotbinière—Chutes-de-la-Chaudière	Jacques Gourde	Incumbent Member of Parliament	M	Saint-Narcisse	Parliamentarian			
Louis-Hébert	Pierre Paul-Hus	Co-editor of PRESTIGE Magazine, former infantry commanding officer in the Canadian Forces (Reserve)	M	Quebec City	Editor			
Louis-Saint-Laurent	Josée Verner	Incumbent Member of Parliament	F	Saint-Augustin-de-Desmaures	Executive assistant, political advisor			
Manicouagan	Gordon Ferguson		M					
Marc-Aurèle-Fortin	Johanne Théoret							
Mégantic—L'Érable	Christian Paradis	Incumbent Member of Parliament	M	Thetford Mines	Lawyer			
Montcalm	Jason Fuoco							
Montmagny—L'Islet—Kamouraska—Rivière-du-Loup	Bernard Généreux	Retiring mayor of La Pocatière, QC	M	La Pocatière	Mayor			
Montmorency—Charlevoix—Haute-Côte-Nord								
Mount Royal	Saulie Zajdel	Former Montreal city councilor						
Notre-Dame-de-Grâce—Lachine	Matthew Conway		M					
Outremont	Rudy Husny		M	Montreal	Accountant			
Papineau	Shama Chopra							
Pierrefonds—Dollard	Agop Evereklian	2008 candidate in Laval—Les Îles	M	Laval	Political advisor			
Pontiac	Lawrence Cannon	Incumbent Member of Parliament	M	Gatineau	Parliamentarian			
Portneuf—Jacques-Cartier	-	No candidate	-	-	-	-	-	-
Québec	Pierre Morasse		M	Quebec	Communications Manager			
Repentigny	Christophe Royer		M					
Richmond—Arthabaska	Jean-Philippe Bachand		M					
Rimouski-Neigette—Témiscouata—Les Basques	Bertin Denis							
Rivière-des-Mille-Îles	Lucie Leblanc		F					
Rivière-du-Nord	Sylvain Charron							
Roberval—Lac-Saint-Jean	Denis Lebel	Incumbent Member of Parliament	M	Roberval	Parliamentarian			
Rosemont—La Petite-Patrie	Sébastien Forté	Forté was born in Munich, Germany. Following the 2011 election, he was appointed to Canada's Employment Insurance board of referees.	M		Teacher	2,328	4.32	4th
Saint-Bruno—Saint-Hubert	Nicole Charbonneau Barron	2008 candidate in this riding	F	Saint-Bruno-de-Montarville	Administrative assistant			
Saint-Hyacinthe—Bagot	Jean-Guy Dagenais		M					
Saint-Jean	Jean Thoulin		M					
Saint-Lambert	Qais Hamidi	2006 candidate in Laval—Les Îles	M	Longueuil	Cultural Advisor			
Saint-Laurent—Cartierville	Svetlana Litvin		F					
Saint-Léonard—Saint-Michel	Riccardo De Ioris		M					
Saint-Maurice—Champlain	Jacques Grenier		M					
Shefford	Mélisa Leclerc	Deputy Communications Director for Prime Minister Stephen Harper	F	Granby				
Sherbrooke	Pierre Harvey		M					
Terrebonne—Blainville	Jean-Philippe Payment		M					
Trois-Rivières	Pierre Lacroix							
Vaudreuil—Soulanges	Marc Boudreau		M					
Verchères—Les Patriotes	Rodrigo Alfaro		M		Aerospace project manager			
Westmount—Ville-Marie	Neil Drabkin		M					

== Ontario - 106 seats ==
Riding	Candidate's Name	Notes	Gender	Residence	Occupation	Votes	%	Rank
Ajax—Pickering	Chris Alexander	Former Canadian Ambassador to Afghanistan and United Nations Representative in Afghanistan	M		Diplomat			
Algoma—Manitoulin—Kapuskasing	Ray Sturgeon		M					
Ancaster—Dundas—Flamborough—Westdale	David Sweet	Incumbent Member of Parliament	M	Ancaster	Parliamentarian			
Barrie	Patrick Brown	Incumbent Member of Parliament	M	Barrie	Parliamentarian			
Beaches—East York	Bill Burrows		M					
Bramalea—Gore—Malton	Bal Gosal		M		Insurance broker			
Brampton—Springdale	Parm Gill	2008 candidate in this riding. 2006 candidate in York West	M	Brampton	Entrepreneur			
Brampton West	Kyle Seeback	2008 candidate in this riding.	M	Brampton	Lawyer			
Brant	Phil McColeman	Incumbent Member of Parliament	M	Brantford	Project Manager			
Bruce—Grey—Owen Sound	Larry Miller	Incumbent Member of Parliament	M	Wiarton	Parliamentarian			
Burlington	Mike Wallace	Incumbent Member of Parliament	M	Burlington	Parliamentarian			
Cambridge	Gary Goodyear	Incumbent Member of Parliament	M	Cambridge	Parliamentarian			
Carleton—Mississippi Mills	Gordon O'Connor	Incumbent Member of Parliament	M	Ottawa	Parliamentarian			
Chatham-Kent—Essex	Dave Van Kesteren	Incumbent Member of Parliament	M	Chatham	Parliamentarian			
Davenport	Theresa Rodrigues		F					
Don Valley East	Joe Daniel		M	Toronto				
Don Valley West	John Carmichael	2006 and 2008 candidate in this riding	M	Toronto	Business Executive			
Dufferin—Caledon	David Tilson	Incumbent Member of Parliament	M	Orangeville	Lawyer			
Durham	Bev Oda	Incumbent Member of Parliament	F	Orono	Parliamentarian			
Eglinton—Lawrence	Joseph Oliver	2008 candidate in this riding	M	Toronto	Retired			
Elgin—Middlesex—London	Joe Preston	Incumbent Member of Parliament	M	St. Thomas	Parliamentarian			
Essex	Jeff Watson	Incumbent Member of Parliament	M	Amherstburg	Auto Worker			
Etobicoke Centre	Ted Opitz		M					
Etobicoke—Lakeshore	Bernard Trottier		M					
Etobicoke North	Priti Lamba		F	Toronto	University Professor (Humber College and Centennial College)			
Glengarry—Prescott—Russell	Pierre Lemieux	Incumbent Member of Parliament	M	Cumberland	Parliamentarian			
Guelph	Marty Burke	Veteran of the Canadian Forces	M	Guelph	Pilot (Air Canada)			
Haldimand—Norfolk	Diane Finley	Incumbent Member of Parliament	F	Simcoe	Parliamentarian			
Haliburton—Kawartha Lakes—Brock	Barry Devolin	Incumbent Member of Parliament	M	Haliburton	Real Estate, Member of Parliament			
Halton	Lisa Raitt	Incumbent Member of Parliament	F	Oakville	Chief Executive Officer			
Hamilton Centre	James W. Byron		M	Hamilton	Retired			
Hamilton East—Stoney Creek	Robert A. Silenzi		M	Ancaster	Restaurant Manager, Brain Injury rehab specialist			
Hamilton Mountain	Terry Anderson	2008 candidate in this riding	M	Mount Hope	Insurance Broker			
Huron—Bruce	Ben Lobb	Incumbent Member of Parliament	M	Holmesville	Business Analyst			
Kenora	Greg Rickford	Incumbent Member of Parliament	M	Kenora	Lawyer			
Kingston and the Islands	Alicia Gordon		F					
Kitchener Centre	Stephen Woodworth	Incumbent Member of Parliament	M	Kitchener	Lawyer			
Kitchener—Conestoga	Harold Albrecht	Incumbent Member of Parliament	M	Petersburg	Parliamentarian			
Kitchener—Waterloo	Peter Braid	Incumbent Member of Parliament	M	Waterloo	Account Manager			
Lambton—Kent—Middlesex	Bev Shipley	Incumbent Member of Parliament	M	Denfield	Parliamentarian, Farmer			
Lanark—Frontenac—Lennox and Addington	Scott Reid	Incumbent Member of Parliament	M	Mississippi Mills	Parliamentarian			
Leeds—Grenville	Gord Brown	Incumbent Member of Parliament	M	Gananoque	Parliamentarian			
London—Fanshawe	Jim Chahbar	Small Business Owner	M	London	Entrepreneur			
London North Centre	Susan Truppe	Former political aide	F	London	Hotel Manager			
London West	Ed Holder	Incumbent Member of Parliament	M	Komoka	Insurance Benefits Consultant			
Markham—Unionville	Bob Saroya	2008 Candidate in Etobicoke North	M		Entrepreneur			
Mississauga—Brampton South	Eve Adams	Mississauga city councillor for Ward 5, Peel regional councillor for Mississauga Ward 5	F	Mississauga	Municipal councillor, Regional councillor			
Mississauga East—Cooksville	Wladyslaw Lizon	President of the Canadian Polish Congress	M	Mississauga	Engineer			
Mississauga—Erindale	Bob Dechert	Incumbent Member of Parliament	M	Mississauga	Lawyer			
Mississauga South	Stella Ambler	2008 Candidate in Bramalea—Gore—Malton	F	Brampton	Community Activist			
Mississauga—Streetsville	Brad Butt		M	Mississauga	President and CEO (Greater Toronto Apartment Association)			
Nepean—Carleton	Pierre Poilievre	Incumbent Member of Parliament	M	Nepean	Parliamentarian			
Newmarket—Aurora	Lois Brown	Incumbent Member of Parliament	F	Newmarket	Consultant			
Niagara Falls	Rob Nicholson	Incumbent Member of Parliament	M	Niagara Falls	Lawyer			
Niagara West—Glanbrook	Dean Allison	Incumbent Member of Parliament	M	Beamsville	Parliamentarian			
Nickel Belt	Lynne Reynolds	Former Greater Sudbury city councillor	F					
Nipissing—Timiskaming	Jay Aspin		M					
Northumberland—Quinte West	Rick Norlock	Incumbent Member of Parliament	M	Warkworth	Retired Police Office			
Oak Ridges—Markham	Paul Calandra	Incumbent Member of Parliament	M	Stouffville	Insurance Broker			
Oakville	Terence Young	Incumbent Member of Parliament	M	Oakville	Consultant			
Oshawa	Colin Carrie	Incumbent Member of Parliament	M	Oshawa	Parliamentarian			
Ottawa Centre	Damian Konstantinakos		M	Ottawa	Business manager			
Ottawa—Orléans	Royal Galipeau	Incumbent Member of Parliament	M	Ottawa	Parliamentarian			
Ottawa South	Elie Salibi		M					
Ottawa—Vanier	Rem Westland		M	Ottawa				
Ottawa West—Nepean	John Baird	Incumbent Member of Parliament	M	Nepean	Parliamentarian			
Oxford	Dave Mackenzie	Incumbent Member of Parliament	M	Woodstock	General Manager			
Parkdale—High Park	Taylor Train		M					
Parry Sound-Muskoka	Tony Clement	Incumbent Member of Parliament	M	Port Sydney	Parliamentarian			
Perth Wellington	Gary Schellenberger	Incumbent Member of Parliament	M	Sebringville	Parliamentarian			
Peterborough	Dean Del Mastro	Incumbent Member of Parliament		Peterborough	Parliamentarian			
Pickering—Scarborough East	Corneliu Chisu		M		Engineer; Retired Canadian Forces Major			
Prince Edward—Hastings	Daryl Kramp	Incumbent Member of Parliament	M	Madoc	Parliamentarian			
Renfrew—Nipissing—Pembroke	Cheryl Gallant	Incumbent Member of Parliament	F	Pembroke	Parliamentarian			
Richmond Hill	Costas Menegakis		M	Richmond Hill	Entrepreneur			
St. Catharines	Rick Dykstra	Incumbent Member of Parliament	M	St. Catharines	Parliamentarian			
St. Paul's	Maureen Harquail		F					
Sarnia—Lambton	Patricia Davidson	Incumbent Member of Parliament	F	Wyoming	Parliamentarian			
Sault Ste. Marie	Bryan Hayes		M					
Scarborough—Agincourt	Harry Tsai		M	Markham	Entrepreneur			
Scarborough Centre	Roxanne James		F		Real Estate Professional			
Scarborough-Guildwood	Kazimierz ("Chuck") Konkel	2008 candidate in this riding	M	Toronto	Police Officer			
Scarborough—Rouge River	Marlene Gallyot		F					
Scarborough Southwest	Gavan Parachothy		M					
Simcoe—Grey	Kellie Leitch		F					
Simcoe North	Bruce Stanton	Incumbent Member of Parliament	M	Coldwater	Parliamentarian			
Stormont—Dundas—South Glengarry	Guy Lauzon	Incumbent Member of Parliament	M	St. Andrews West	Parliamentarian			
Sudbury	Fred Slade		M					
Thornhill	Peter Kent	Incumbent Member of Parliament	M	Thornhill	Broadcast Executive			
Thunder Bay—Rainy River	Maureen Comuzzi Stehmann		F					
Thunder Bay—Superior North	Michael Auld		M					
Timmins-James Bay	Bill Greenberg	2006 Candidate in this riding	M					
Toronto Centre	Kevin Moore		M					
Toronto—Danforth	Katarina Von Koenig		F					
Trinity—Spadina	Gin Siow							
Vaughan	Julian Fantino	Incumbent Member of Parliament	M		Former Commissioner of Ontario Provincial Police			
Welland	Leanne Villella		F	Welland	Businesswoman			
Wellington—Halton Hills	Michael Chong	Incumbent	M	Elora	Parliamentarian			
Whitby—Oshawa	Jim Flaherty	Incumbent Member of Parliament	M	Whitby	Lawyer			
Willowdale	Chungsen Leung	Progressive Conservative candidate in this riding in 2000, and Conservative Candidate for Richmond Hill in 2008	M	Richmond Hill	Businessman			
Windsor—Tecumseh	Denise Ghanam	2008 candidate in this riding	F	Windsor	Business Owner			
Windsor West	Lisa Lumley	2008 candidate in this riding	F	Windsor	Legal Assistant			
York Centre	Mark Adler		M	Toronto				
York—Simcoe	Peter Van Loan	Incumbent Member of Parliament	M	Sutton West	Lawyer			
York South—Weston	Jilian Saweczko	Two-time Candidate in Parkdale—High Park (2008 as a Conservative and 1997 as a Progressive Conservative	F	Toronto	Businessman			
York West	Audrey Walters		F					

== Manitoba - 14 Seats ==
Riding	Candidate's Name	Notes	Gender	Residence	Occupation	Votes	%	Rank
Brandon—Souris	Merv Tweed	Incumbent Member of Parliament	M	Brandon	Parliamentarian			
Charleswood—St. James—Assiniboia	Steven Fletcher	Incumbent Member of Parliament	M	Winnipeg	Parliamentarian			
Churchill	Wally Daudrich	2008 candidate in this riding.	M	Churchill	Wildlife Tour Guide			
Dauphin—Swan River—Marquette	Robert Sopuck	Incumbent MP	M	Sandy Lake	Fisheries Biologist			
Elmwood—Transcona	Lawrence Toet		M	Winnipeg	Businessman			
Kildonan—St. Paul	Joy Smith	Incumbent Member of Parliament	F	Winnipeg	Parliamentarian			
Portage—Lisgar	Candice Hoeppner	Incumbent Member of Parliament	F	Winkler	Political Consultant/Organizer			
Provencher	Vic Toews	Incumbent Member of Parliament	M	Steinbach	Parliamentarian			
Saint Boniface	Shelly Glover	Incumbent Member of Parliament	F	Winnipeg	Police Officer			
Selkirk—Interlake	James Bezan	Incumbent Member of Parliament	M	Teulon	Parliamentarian / Cattle Producer			
Winnipeg Centre	Bev Pitura		F					
Winnipeg North	Ann Matejicka		F					
Winnipeg South	Rod Bruinooge	Incumbent Member of Parliament	M	Winnipeg	Entrepreneur			
Winnipeg South Centre	Joyce Bateman		F	Winnipeg				

== Saskatchewan - 14 seats ==
Riding	Candidate's Name	Notes	Gender	Residence	Occupation	Votes	%	Rank
Battlefords—Lloydminster	Gerry Ritz	Incumbent Member of Parliament	M	St. Walburg	Parliamentarian			
Blackstrap	Lynne Yelich	Incumbent Member of Parliament	F	Kenaston	Parliamentarian			
Cypress Hills—Grasslands	David L. Anderson	Incumbent Member of Parliament	M	Frontier	Parliamentarian			
Desnethé—Missinippi—Churchill River	Rob Clarke	Incumbent Member of Parliament	M	Warman	Parliamentarian			
Palliser	Ray Boughen	Incumbent Member of Parliament	M	Moose Jaw	Education Consultant			
Prince Albert	Randy Hoback	Incumbent Member of Parliament	M	Prince Albert	Farmer			
Regina—Lumsden—Lake Centre	Tom Lukiwski	Incumbent Member of Parliament	M	Regina Beach	Parliamentarian			
Regina—Qu'Appelle	Andrew Scheer	Incumbent Member of Parliament	M	Regina	Insurance Industry			
Saskatoon—Humboldt	Brad Trost	Incumbent Member of Parliament	M	Saskatoon	Geophysicist			
Saskatoon—Rosetown—Biggar	Kelly Block	Incumbent Member of Parliament	F	Saskatoon	Administrator			
Saskatoon—Wanuskewin	Maurice Vellacott	Incumbent Member of Parliament	M	Saskatoon	Parliamentarian			
Souris—Moose Mountain	Ed Komarnicki	Incumbent Member of Parliament	M	Estevan	Parliamentarian			
Wascana	Ian Shields		M					
Yorkton—Melville	Garry Breitkreuz	Incumbent Member of Parliament	M	Springside	Teacher-Farmer			

== Alberta - 28 seats ==
Riding	Candidate's Name	Notes	Gender	Residence	Occupation	Votes	%	Rank
Calgary Centre	Lee Richardson	Incumbent Member of Parliament	M	Calgary	Businessman			
Calgary Centre-North	Michelle Rempel		F	Calgary	Employee of the University of Calgary			
Calgary East	Deepak Obhrai	Incumbent Member of Parliament	M	Calgary	Parliamentarian			
Calgary Northeast	Devinder Shory	Incumbent Member of Parliament	M	Calgary	Lawyer			
Calgary—Nose Hill	Diane Ablonczy	Incumbent Member of Parliament	F	Calgary	Parliamentarian			
Calgary Southeast	Jason Kenney	Incumbent Member of Parliament	M	Calgary	Parliamentarian			
Calgary Southwest	Stephen Harper	Incumbent Member of Parliament; Prime Minister; Leader of the Conservative Party	M	Calgary	Parliamentarian			
Calgary West	Rob Anders	Incumbent Member of Parliament	M	Calgary	Parliamentarian			
Crowfoot	Kevin Sorenson	Incumbent Member of Parliament	M	Killam	Parliamentarian			
Edmonton Centre	Laurie Hawn	Incumbent Member of Parliament	M	Edmonton	Parliamentarian			
Edmonton East	Peter Goldring	Incumbent Member of Parliament	M	Edmonton	Parliamentarian			
Edmonton—Leduc	James Rajotte	Incumbent Member of Parliament	M	Edmonton	Parliamentarian			
Edmonton—Mill Woods—Beaumont	Mike Lake	Incumbent Member of Parliament	M	Edmonton	Parliamentarian			
Edmonton—St. Albert	Brent Rathgeber	Incumbent Member of Parliament	M	Edmonton	Lawyer			
Edmonton—Sherwood Park	Tim Uppal	Incumbent Member of Parliament	M	Sherwood Park	Business Manager			
Edmonton—Spruce Grove	Rona Ambrose	Incumbent Member of Parliament	F	Edmonton	Parliamentarian			
Edmonton—Strathcona	Ryan Hastman		M					
Fort McMurray—Athabasca	Brian Jean	Incumbent Member of Parliament	M	Fort McMurray	Parliamentarian			
Lethbridge	Jim Hillyer		M	Stirling	Business consultant			
Macleod	Ted Menzies	Incumbent Member of Parliament	M	Claresholm	Farmer			
Medicine Hat	LaVar Payne	Incumbent Member of Parliament	M	Medicine Hat	Assistant Sprecial House of Commons			
Peace River	Christopher Warkentin	Incumbent Member of Parliament	M	Grande Prairie	Parliamentarian			
Red Deer	Earl Dreeshen	Incumbent Member of Parliament	M	Innisfail	Farmer			
Vegreville—Wainwright	Leon Benoit	Incumbent Member of Parliament	M	Vermilion	Farmer			
Westlock—St. Paul	Brian Storseth	Incumbent Member of Parliament	M	St. Paul	Parliamentarian			
Wetaskiwin	Blaine Calkins	Incumbent Member of Parliament	M	Lacombe	College Instructor			
Wild Rose	Blake Richards	Incumbent Member of Parliament	M	Airdrie	Realtor			
Yellowhead	Rob Merrifield	Incumbent Member of Parliament	M	Whitecourt	Self-Employed			

== British Columbia - 36 seats ==
Riding	Candidate's Name	Notes	Gender	Residence	Occupation	Votes	%	Rank
Abbotsford	Ed Fast	Incumbent Member of Parliament	M	Abbotsford	Parliamentarian			
British Columbia Southern Interior	Stephen Hill		M		Businessman			
Burnaby—Douglas	Ronald Leung	2008 Candidate in riding	M					
Burnaby—New Westminster	Paul Forseth	Former MP (New Westminster—Coquitlam)	M	New Westminster	Probation Court Officer			
Cariboo—Prince George	Richard Harris	Incumbent Member of Parliament	M	Prince George	Parliamentarian			
Chilliwack—Fraser Canyon	Mark Strahl	Son of Chuck Strahl	M	Chilliwack	Executive assistant			
Delta—Richmond East	Kerry-Lynne Findlay	Canadian Alliance candidate in Vancouver Quadra in 2000	F		Lawyer			
Esquimalt—Juan de Fuca	Troy Desouza	Candidate in 2006 and 2008 in riding	M	Lawyer				
Fleetwood—Port Kells	Nina Grewal	Incumbent Member of Parliament	F	Surrey	Parliamentarian			
Kamloops—Thompson—Cariboo	Cathy McLeod	Incumbent Member of Parliament	F	Kamloops	Health Care Management			
Kelowna—Lake Country	Ronald Cannan	Incumbent Member of Parliament	M	Kelowna	Parliamentarian			
Kootenay—Columbia	David Wilks		M		Police Officer			
Langley	Mark Warawa	Incumbent Member of Parliament	M					
Nanaimo—Alberni	James Lunney	Incumbent Member of Parliament	M					
Nanaimo—Cowichan	John Koury		M					
Newton—North Delta	Mani Kaur-Fallon		F					
New Westminster—Coquitlam	Diana Dilworth		F		Incumbent Member of Parliament			
North Vancouver	Andrew Saxton	Incumbent Member of Parliament	M					
Okanagan—Coquihalla	Dan Albas		M					
Okanagan—Shuswap	Colin Mayes	Incumbent Member of Parliament	M					
Pitt Meadows—Maple Ridge—Mission	Randy Kamp	Incumbent Member of Parliament	M					
Port Moody—Westwood—Port Coquitlam	James Moore	Incumbent Member of Parliament	M					
Prince George—Peace River	Bob Zimmer		M	Fort St. John	Teacher			
Richmond	Alice Wong	Incumbent Member of Parliament	F					
Saanich—Gulf Islands	Gary Lunn	Incumbent Member of Parliament	M					
Skeena—Bulkley Valley	Clay Harmon		M					
South Surrey—White Rock—Cloverdale	Russ Hiebert	Incumbent Member of Parliament	M					
Surrey North	Dona Cadman	Incumbent Member of Parliament	F					
Vancouver Centre	Jennifer Clarke		F	Former Vancouver councillor				
Vancouver East	Irene Yatco		F		Editor of the Filipino-Canadian newspaper			
Vancouver Island North	John Duncan	Incumbent Member of Parliament	M					
Vancouver Kingsway	Trang Nguyen		F	Vancouver				
Vancouver Quadra	Deborah Meredith	2008 Candidate in this riding	F	Vancouver	Lecturer (UBC)			
Vancouver South	Wai Young	2008 Candidate in this riding	F		Businesswoman and policy consultant			
Victoria	G. Patrick Hunt	Former Nova Scotia MLA	M		Retired			
West Vancouver—Sunshine Coast—Sea to Sky Country	John Weston	Incumbent Member of Parliament	M					

== Yukon - 1 seat ==
Riding	Candidate's Name	Notes	Gender	Residence	Occupation	Votes	%	Rank
Yukon	Ryan Leef		M	Whitehorse	MMA fighter/Correctional Centre Supervisor			

== Northwest Territories - 1 seat ==
Riding	Candidate's Name	Notes	Gender	Residence	Occupation	Votes	%	Rank
Western Arctic	Sandy Lee		F	Yellowknife	Former territorial MLA.			

== Nunavut - 1 seat ==
Riding	Candidate's Name	Notes	Gender	Residence	Occupation	Votes	%	Rank
Nunavut	Leona Aglukkaq	Incumbent	F					

== See also ==
- Results of the Canadian federal election, 2008
- Results by riding for the Canadian federal election, 2008
