= World Federalist Movement-Canada =

The World Federalist Movement – Canada
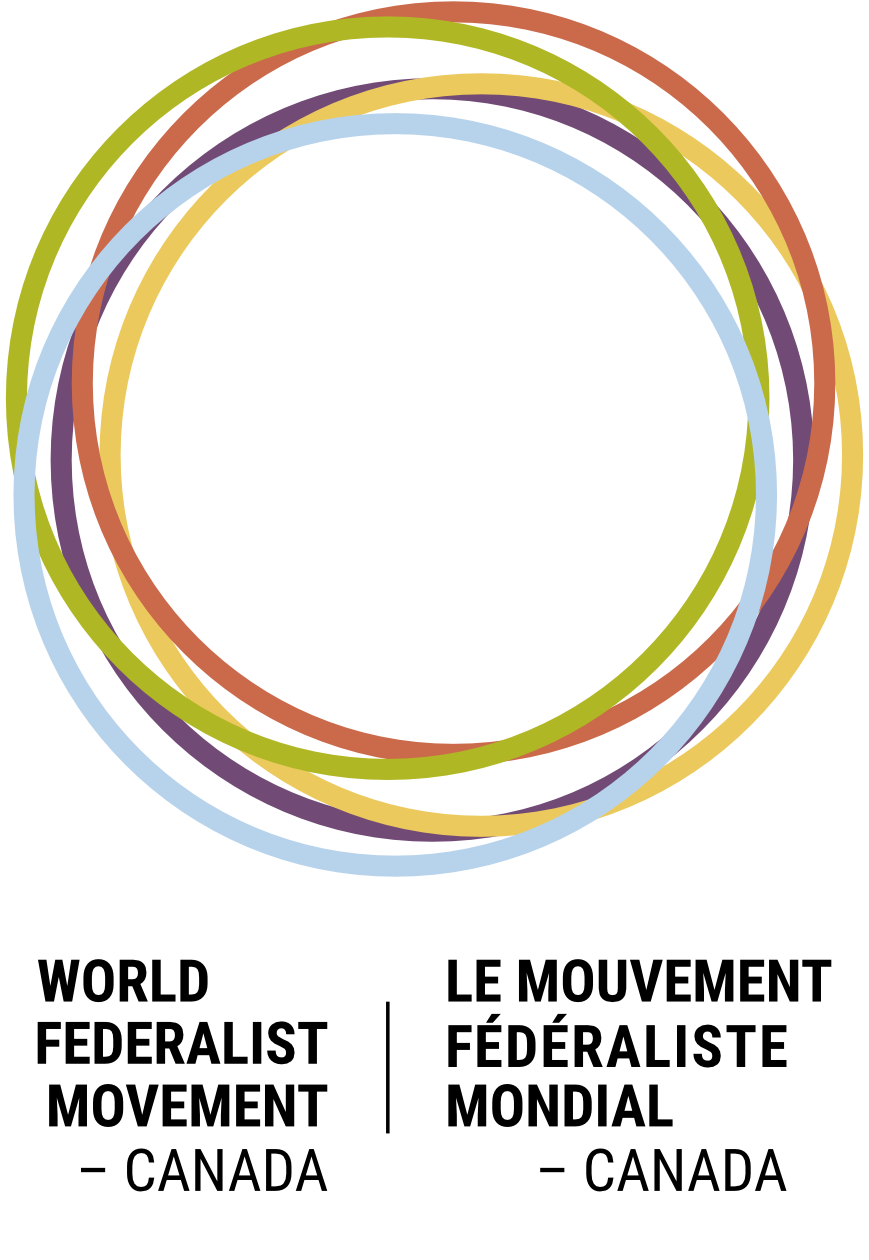
- Predecessor: World Government Association
- Founded: July 28, 1951
- Headquarters: 323 Chapel St, Suite 110, Ottawa
- Locations: Toronto; Vancouver; Montreal; Victoria
- Members: ~1,000
- Key people: Karen Hamilton (President); Nancy Regehr (National Treasurer); Brandon Nakasato (National Secretary); Alexandre MacIsaac (Executive Director).
- Website: wfmcanada.org

The World Federalist Movement — Canada (WFMC) is a member organization of the World Federalist Movement, a global citizens movement dedicated to promoting institutions of world governance. WFMC has a national headquarters in Ottawa, and active branches in Toronto, Vancouver, Victoria, and Montreal. Since its founding in 1951, the WFMC and its predecessor organizations have been a strong advocate for the application of the principles of democratic federalism to world affairs. It advocates for the strengthening international bodies and democratizing existent global institutions.

The current National President of the Canadian section of the movement is scientist and conflict researcher Walter Dorn, who succeeded former Cabinet Minister Hon. Warren Allmand in August 2016. Other well known Canadians have also served as WFMC President, including Hon. Flora MacDonald, The Very Rev. Sen. Lois M. Wilson and Hon. Allan Blakeney.

As World Federalists, we view the world as one society embracing all of humanity in all its diversity. To this end, we call for urgent progress in developing those democratic world institutions which are essential to assure a peaceful, just, and ecologically sustainable world community.

== Activity ==
The organization's slogan is "Building a World Community." With a broad mandate, World Federalists undertake national and international programs that push for long-term goals in international relations and Canadian foreign policy.

=== United Nations Reform ===
In 2005, the WFMC presented to the House of Commons Standing Committee on Foreign Affairs and International Trade and recommended they "provide concrete support for the development of a parliamentary assembly at the UN." On Sept. 13, 2013, the WFMC organized the release and publication of a booklet of essays by 18 former diplomats, cabinet ministers, and foreign affairs experts spoke out against Canada's diminishing relationship with the United Nations. Their views were published in an accompanying booklet of essays, compiled and published by the WFMC, titled: “The United Nations and Canada: What Canada has done and should be doing at the UN“.

=== Peacekeeping and Security ===
The WFMC advocates a much larger role for Canada in support of United Nations peace operations, and releases biannual updates on this topic.

"UN peace operations provide unparalleled legitimacy to international efforts" said Walter Dorn in a WFMC statement to The Globe and Mail “That's why Canadians, as shown in many polls, continue to support peacekeeping, even when Canada is at an all-time low in contributions of personnel.”

The WFMC also advocates for a United Nations Emergency Peace Service (UNEPS) to provide the UN with a permanent rapid reaction to conflict.

In 2012, the WFMC joined other civil society organizations to lobby for changes in Canada's draft legislation to implement the Convention on Cluster Munitions. On Oct. 18, WFMC representatives spoke at the Standing Senate Committee on Foreign Affairs and International Trade and objected to the exceptions that would allow Canadian personnel to carry out activities supporting the use of cluster munitions.

=== Global Democratization ===
Modern communications and technological change and the end of the Cold War have contributed to a growing recognition of the need for strengthened democratic governance around the world. In addition to the need for greater democratic governance around the world's nations, World Federalists call for the democratization of global governance. One practical program supported by the World Federalists is the Campaign for the Establishment of a United Nations Parliamentary Assembly at the United Nations.

The organization also closely monitors and comments on the UN's Post-2015 Development Agenda. They suggest “one world goals," and an agenda that can be addressed in all countries.

=== Responsibility to Protect ===
WFMC monitors and supports the progressive development of the Responsibility to Protect normative framework and is a supporting member of the International Coalition for the Responsibility to Protect (ICRtoP). WFMC is also a member of NGO networks that correspond to the organization's international goals, including the Coalition for the International Criminal Court, the Canadian Council for International Cooperation, the Canadian Network to Abolish Nuclear Weapons and the Climate Action Network - Canada.

== Objectives ==
In their constitution, the WFMC states it seeks a balance between the rights of nation-states and the collective rights and responsibilities of the global community. As per its programming, its main efforts are to establish a rule of law above state sovereignty. "These world institutions must have the legal and political authority to make and/or enforce international law in order to deal with those problems that can only be resolved effectively at the global level, while affirming the sovereignty of the nation-state in matters which are essentially internal," reads a portion of their national constitution's preamble. It goes on to state the organization's particular attention to:

- Promoting a consciousness of humanity as one community and of every person as a citizen of one world;
- Ending the arms race and the elimination of all weapons of mass destruction;
- Ending the use of military force save in the common interest to maintain peace and to prevent aggression;
- Implementing the International Bill of Human Rights and establishing democratic world institutions;
- Promoting international development to reduce world poverty, to provide an equitable distribution of global wealth and to *shape globalization positively;
- Protecting our common environment and the preservation of the ecosystem for succeeding generations; and
- Reforming the United Nations system to render it more democratic and effective in the pursuit of its mission and goals.

== History ==
The organization's history is rooted in the immediate post-war period, when it was recognized by many that the new United Nations was inadequately structured to fulfil its primary purpose—the maintenance of international peace and security.

=== Decentralized Canadian Network ===
Toronto lawyer and political icon Lewis Duncan lost his only child on a Dutch battlefield, a month before the end of the Second World War. In the wake of this loss, Duncan used his local connections to assemble a group of prominent individuals into a new public-service organization called the World Government Association, Dec. 1945. The group became associated with the larger movement as the philosophy of federalism began to gain traction globally.

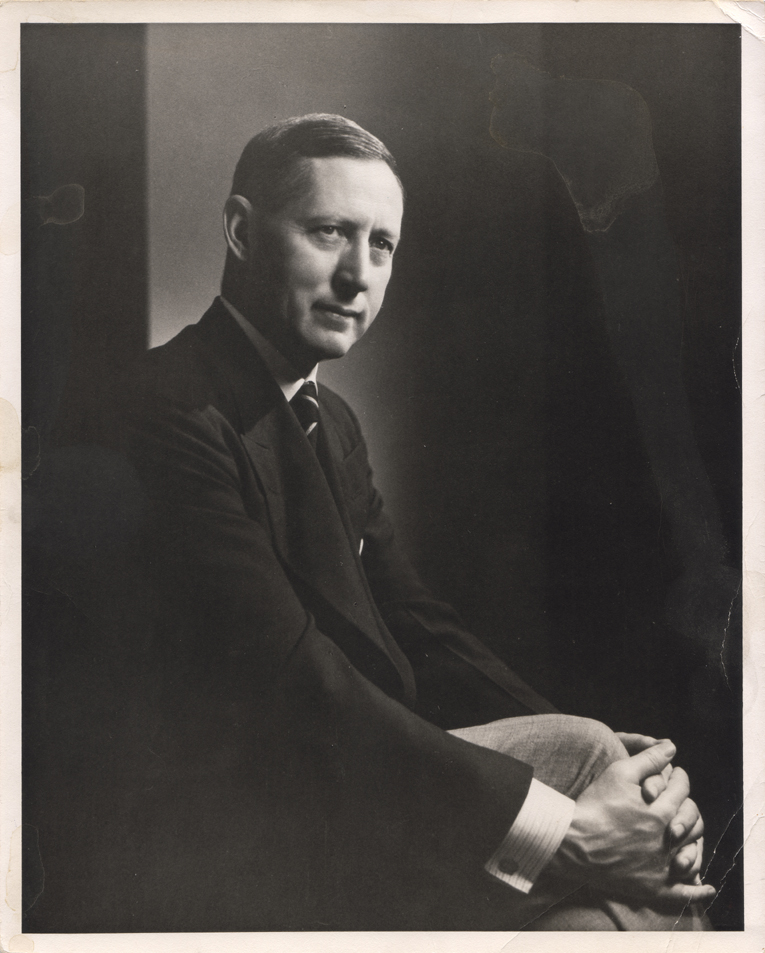
James Lewis Duncan (1892-1960). Photo from The Law Society of Upper Canada.

With more of a political edge than their Toronto counterparts, the Ottawa world federalists took advantage of their location in the national capital. In 1949, the group was successful in drumming up support for world federalism from seven CCF Members of Parliament and two PCs, including leader John Bracken. In response to a speech by Prime Minister Mackenzie King, Bracken said "our path as Canadians is clear. Collective security for humanity is possible only in international collective agreement.[...]That price is the sacrifice of some degree of national sovereignty." The Hon. Lester B. Pearson, Liberal Secretary of State for External Affairs, congratulated the Ottawa group "...on its work to extend and consolidate international cooperation..."

In April 1949, ten world federalists who had been meeting since Fall 1948 organized themselves into the Saskatoon World Government Association. It was modelled after the Toronto group, and was active in lobbying Saskatchewan Members of Parliament, and even interested Premier Tommy Douglas in world federalism. Douglas was inspired enough to make several speeches on the subject, advocating for an international court, police force and parliament. He also devoted one of his famous weekly fireside chats to the topic of world federalism. The Saskatoon world federalists spread their message by sending speakers throughout the province, and having a letter to the editor published in the Saskatoon Star Phoenix.

After a Dec. 1949 talk by Toronto world federalist Charles Millard at the Winnipeg YMCA, 18 members of the YMCA Citizen's Forum Group and the Phoenix Club formed a world government group. Dr. Bernard G. Whitmore, associate professor at the University of Manitoba Department of Physics, was elected chairman of the Winnipeg World Government Association. The group was successful in holding several public meetings and debates, and received support from Liberal MP Ralph Maybank, CCF MP Alistair Stewart, and later PC MP Gordon Churchill.

In Vancouver, Elmore Philpott worked with Lewis Duncan on his national initiatives, and even ran as an independent candidate in a provincial election, campaigning on a world government platform and achieving a close second place finish. Between 1949 and 1950, other coordinated world federalist activity went on in Halifax, Hamilton, and Norfolk County.

=== Formation of the World Federalists of Canada ===
While the Ottawa, Montreal, and Saskatoon groups called for a national meeting, the Toronto branch was reluctant to pursue a Canada-wide union after their bad experiences with the World Government Association under Duncan's leadership. The Toronto world federalists were committed in assisting the other Canadian groups, but it eventually fell to Winnipeg to organize them into what Whitmore proposed as a "...loose national organization...for the purpose of making joint pronouncements and representations if for nothing else."

By March 1951, Toronto has softened and a news sheet called "Canadian World Government News" was ready for distribution among the groups. On February 5, 1951, Winnipeg discussed a draft national constitution at its first annual general meeting. And on July 28, 1951, Whitmore arranged a meeting of the different regional groups at the Ottawa YMCA. Representatives from Ottawa, Toronto, Montreal, and Winnipeg attended, with Saskatoon representing itself by correspondence. The assembly reviewed and adopted Winnipeg's draft constitution. The Toronto group had already applied for membership in the World Movement for World Federal Government and turned their application over to the new national association.

== World Peace Award ==
The idea to establish a peace award was introduced by Richard Plant in 1972. He wrote:

The stereotype of the military hero is outmoded today… We must, with due regard to our individual and collective security… construct a new model—that of the world peace hero… We feel that every day it becomes more imperative that we honour those among us who have the courage and the competence to lead us and our government so skillfully… We must honour those who show us how to help our neighbor nations around the world show us how to understand their problems and policies, so that we may all move forward harmoniously…

Year	Recipient	Notes
1972	Lester B. Pearson	
1973	Norman Alcock	
1973	Maurice Strong	
1974	Hannah Newcombe	
1974	Deganawida	
1975	Hugh Keenleyside	
1976	Paul Gerin-Lajoie	
1977	George Ignatieff	
1978	William Epstein	
1979	Cyrus & Alice Eaton	
1981	John Humphrey	
1983	Douglas Roche	
1984	Gwynne Dyer	
1985	Lois Wilson	
1986	Robert Muller	
1987	Veterans Against Nuclear Arms	
1988	Rosalie Bertrell	
1990	Warren Allmand	
1991	Stephen Lewis	
1993	Lewis MacKenzie	
1994	Fred Knelman	
1996	Jules Deschênes	
2000	Louise Arbour	In recognition of work for the International Criminal Court, human rights, and international justice.
2001	Lloyd Axworthy	As minister of foreign affairs and through his work on international issues, Lloyd Axworthy "has personally ‘moved the yardsticks’of change in the direction of world federalism and greater human security for us all."
2002	Roméo Dallaire	In recognition of his peacekeeping experience and study of children in conflict.
2004	Philippe Kirsch	For presiding over the Rome Statute negotiations and for his work as the ICC's first president
2006	Ernie Regehr	In recognition of his expertise and work on multilateral disarmament forums
2008	Gerry Barr	For contributions to international development cooperation and world peace
2010	Flora MacDonald	To honour "her commitment to international development, her willingness to speak out, in her unmistakable forthright manner, for human rights and international justice..."
2012	Erna Paris	For her writing on the International Criminal Court, human rights, sexual violence in conflict zones, and other subjects.
2014	Alyn Ware	As co-founder of a number of organizations, networks and initiatives to abolish nuclear weapons.
2016	Murray Sinclair	For his work as co-chair of Canada's Truth and Reconciliation Commission.
2018	Paul Rogers	In appreciation of his intellectual and organizational leadership in the development of international security and peacebuilding solutions that are sustainable, accountable, durable and people-centred. His work is providing valuable guideposts to the transformations needed to overcome an over-militarized world. Humanism before militarism. Cooperation, not confrontation. Sustainable security for a small planet.
2021	Gen. (Ret.) John de Chastelain	Chastelain was honoured for his commitment to the peace process in Northern Ireland.

== See also ==
- World Federalist Movement
