= Fred Whitman (politician) =

Canadian politician

Member of Parliament for Mount Royal
- In office March 26, 1940 – June 27, 1949
- Preceded by: William Allen Walsh
- Succeeded by: Alan Macnaughton

Member of Parliament for Notre-Dame-de-Grâce
- In office June 1949 – August 1953
- Preceded by: riding created
- Succeeded by: William McLean Hamilton

Personal details
- Born: Frederick Primrose Whitman; 9 March 1896 Lawrencetown, Nova Scotia, Canada
- Died: 21 December 1974 (aged 78)
- Party: Liberal
- Spouse(s): Jennie M. Stewart m. 19 July 1923
- Profession: Salesman

Frederick Primrose Whitman (9 March 1896 – 21 December 1974) was a Liberal party member of the House of Commons of Canada. He was born in Lawrencetown, Nova Scotia and became a salesman by career.

Whitman was educated in the public and secondary schools of Lawrencetown, then attended the University of Alberta where he received a Bachelor of Science degree. During his military service in World War I, he attained the rank of lieutenant.

He was first elected to Parliament at the Mount Royal riding in the 1940 general election then re-elected there in 1945. For the 1949 election, Whitman sought re-election at the new Notre-Dame-de-Grâce riding and won the seat there, but was defeated in the next election in 1953 by William McLean Hamilton of the Progressive Conservative party.
