= Edmund Tobin Asselin =

Canadian politician, administrator and businessman

Member of Parliament for Notre-Dame-de-Grâce
- In office 1962–1965
- Preceded by: William McLean Hamilton
- Succeeded by: Warren Allmand

Personal details
- Born: September 26, 1920 Bromptonville, Quebec, Canada
- Died: March 24, 1999 (aged 78)
- Party: Liberal
- Profession: administrator, businessman

Edmund Tobin Asselin (September 26, 1920 – March 24, 1999) was a Canadian politician, administrator and businessman. He was elected to the House of Commons of Canada in the 1962 election as a Member of the Liberal Party representing the riding of Notre-Dame-de-Grâce. He was re-elected in 1963.
