= William Allen Walsh =

Canadian politician

Member of Parliament for Mount Royal
- In office October 1935 – March 1940
- Preceded by: Robert Smeaton White
- Succeeded by: Fred Whitman

Personal details
- Born: William Allen Walsh; 20 August 1887 Kingston, Ontario, Canada
- Died: 18 October 1940 (aged 53)
- Party: Conservative
- Spouse(s): Edith Thompson m. 27 December 1916
- Profession: school principal, school superintendent, teacher

William Allen Walsh (20 August 1887 – 18 October 1940) was a Conservative member of the House of Commons of Canada. He was born in Kingston, Ontario and became a school principal, school superintendent and teacher, primarily at the Protestant Strathcona Academy in the Montreal suburb of Outremont.

He was first elected to Parliament at the Mount Royal riding in the 1935 general election. After serving one term, the 18th Canadian Parliament, Walsh entered the March 1940 election under the Conservative-based National Government party banner but was defeated by Fred Whitman of the Liberal party. Walsh died months later, on 18 October 1940.

Walsh remains the last member of the House of Commons of Canada to represent the Mount Royal riding who was not a Liberal.
