= William McLean Hamilton =

Canadian politician

William McLean Hamilton, PC OC (February 23, 1919 – June 7, 1989) was a Canadian politician.

== Biography ==
He was born in Montreal, Quebec, Canada. His father, Ernest Hamilton, was a lacrosse player who won a gold medal at the 1908 Summer Olympics. He was a student at the Montreal High School and he took a B.Sc. from Sir George Williams University in business administration.

He sat on Montreal City Council and the Montreal Executive Committee.

He was elected to parliament in the 1953 election as a Progressive Conservative for the riding of Notre-Dame-de-Grâce. In his maiden speech to Parliament in November he accused the Liberal government led by Louis St. Laurent of being socialists. His criticisms were based on the government being corporatistic and taking an interest in private business activities.

Following the 1957 election, he was appointed Postmaster General of Canada by John Diefenbaker. In that office Hamilton annoyed many of his colleagues by not permitting the post office to be used a reward for party supporters. He also drew ire by attempting to close many small and inefficient post offices.

Despite his staunch fiscal conservatism and anti-communism, he was a supporter of the Quebec Liberal Party over the Union Nationale. Hamilton disliked the corruption of the Union Nationale and their infusion of strict Catholicism into Quebec politics. Hamilton was an Anglican.

He resigned as Postmaster General on July 12, 1962, after he was defeated in the 1962 election by Edmund Tobin Asselin. Hamilton could not speak French, and it was a more important issue in 1962 than it had been previously.

After his defeat Hamilton left Montreal for Vancouver where he ran a business.

In 1978 he was made an Officer of the Order of Canada.

There is a William Hamilton fonds at Library and Archives Canada.

Parliament of Canada
Preceded by Frederick Primrose Whitman	Member of Parliament from Notre-Dame-de-Grâce; 1953–1962	Succeeded by Edmund Tobin Asselin
