= Walter Dorn =

Canadian professor and defence specialist (b. 1961)

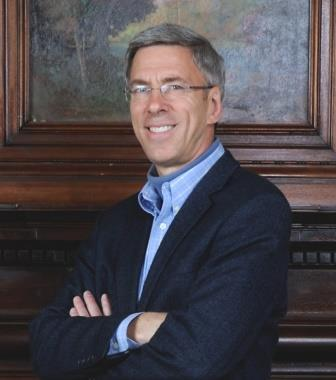
- Born: July 11, 1961 (age 65); Toronto, Ontario, Canada
- Occupation: military historian
- Website: https://www.walterdorn.net/

Walter Dorn (born July 11, 1961) is a Canadian military historian and defence specialist. Dorn teaches military officers and civilian students at the Canadian Forces College (CFC) in Toronto and also at the Royal Military College of Canada (RMC) in Kingston. He lectures and leads seminars on the ethics of armed force, peace operations, the United Nations, arms control, Canadian and US foreign/defence policy, Canadian government and society, and science/technology applications. He has served as chair of the Department of Security and International Affairs at CFC and previously was chair of the Master of Defence Studies programme at RMC.

He has served on the Board of Canadian Pugwash since 1995. From 2008 to 2013, he was chair of that group, which is the Canadian branch of the Pugwash Conferences on Science and World Affairs.

He completed his doctorate in chemistry at the University of Toronto and now applies this scientific background toward the study of peace and conflict issues. He has pursued this work at the Pearson Peacekeeping Centre in Nova Scotia, where he developed and taught courses on technology for peace operations, as well as at Cornell University, where he was a senior research fellow with the Institute for African Development.

== Peace Operations ==
=== UN Consultation ===
In 2006, he was commissioned by the UN Department of Peacekeeping Operations (DPKO) to conduct a study on technologies for peacekeeping especially for monitoring of conflicts, borders, sanctions, civilian protection, staff security, and various Security Council mandates. His report was welcomed by the UN Special Committee on Peacekeeping, composed of 124 member states who contribute to peacekeeping. His 2011 book Keeping Watch: Monitoring, Technology and Innovation in UN Peace Operations served as an impetus for the UN's creation of a Panel of Experts on Technology and Innovation in UN Peacekeeping, of which he was a member. DPKO has sought to implement the recommendations in the panel's report titled Performance Peacekeeping.

He also assisted with the negotiation, ratification, and implementation of the 1993 Chemical Weapons Convention (CWC) as the CWC Coordinator for Parliamentarians for Global Action. Since 1983, he has served as the UN Representative of Science for Peace, a Canadian non-governmental organization (NGO). Dorn addressed the United Nations General Assembly in 1988 at the Second UN Special Session on Disarmament.

In 2017-18, he was on a Canadian civilian deployment to the UN as an Innovation and Protection Technology Expert.[ADD reference: https://www.walterdorn.net/310] In 2020 he was again a UN consultant, when he proposed to the UN a new Occasional Paper series on technology and the first paper in the series was his paper on “Technology Innovation Model for the UN: The “TechNovation Cycle”

He served as a Visiting Professional at the International Criminal Court, working on case selection policy, and technology for evidence-gathering. He introduced the concept of “plausible deniability” to the Prosecutor’s Office, which then used it in cases to explain the actions of alleged perpetrators.

=== Fieldwork ===
Dorn also has experience in United Nations field missions such as the United Nations Mission in East Timor and the UN mission in the Democratic Republic of the Congo, UNDP projects in Ethiopia, and as a Training Adviser with the UN's Department of Peacekeeping Operations (DPKO). He has been sent by UN Headquarters to the field missions, including MINUSCA in the Central African Republic, MINUSMA in Mali, and MONUC/MONUSC in the D. R. Congo. In 2017, he gave a briefing on peacekeeping technology to the annual meeting of UN Force Commanders in the Middle East, held in Naqoura, at the headquarters of the UN mission in Lebanon.

=== Peacekeeping Simulation Project ===
Dr. Dorn’s knowledge of peacekeeping and career in officer education is being applied to create a UN Peacekeeping Simulation game to train peacekeepers and educate the general public through experiential means. This project is based on detailed studies of actual peace operations. The initial scenario for gamification was provided to him by the UN’s Integrated Training Service.

These scenarios offer immersive, scenario-based learning that reflects the everyday roles and realities of peacekeepers. They help players prepare for and understand the complex social situations in modern conflict zones, including child soldiers and sexual violence. They are used in Dorn’s courses at CFC and RMC, as well as peacekeeping training centres around the world.

== Academic career ==
Walter Dorn has taught since 2000 at the Royal Military College of Canada (RMC) and at the Canadian Forces College (CFC) in both official languages using his learner-centric teaching philosophy.

Dorn first came to RMC in 2000 to serve as the organizer (Director) of the International Peacekeeping Summer Institute which offered "critical perspectives on global peace operations." At RMC, he taught the War Studies courses on "International Peacekeeping" in several venues/formats: in person at RMC in Kingston and at National Defence Headquarters (NDHQ) in Ottawa, and by video-teleconference from the CFC in Toronto to students across the country.

At CFC, Dorn has been engaged from his arrival in 2003 in the development of curriculum. He drafted Learning Outcome Guides (LOGs), including guidance (scope, teaching points and readings) for lectures and seminars, and gave feedback to planners on their drafts. He served as the academic adviser for the colonels and equivalents courses, i.e., National Security Studies Course (NSSC), later renamed the National Security Programme.

Dr. Dorn frequently lectures in the Joint Command and Staff Programme (JCSP) at CFC on subjects such as "Just War Tradition and the Ethics of War," "Social Fabric of Canada," "United Nations," and "Peace Support Operations." He has also taught in JCSP seminars:

- Canadian Defence, Development and Foreign Policy
- Canadian Government and Society
- International Relations Theory
- Global Institutions
- Global Powers
- Strategic Express
- US Foreign and Defence Policies

== World Federalist Movement - Canada ==
Dr. Walter Dorn joined the World Federalist Movement in the mid-1980s and was President of the World Federalist Movement of Canada for three terms, starting 2016. During his time at the organization, he spearheaded projects and events related to global peace and security with an emphasis on UN peacekeeping. He was responsible for chairing the WFM-Canada’s annual meetings and introduced a new code of conduct.

== Media ==
Dr. Dorn serves as a public intellectual, appearing over a dozen times a year in the media, mostly Canadian. He has also written many op-eds for newspaper including the Globe and Mail, the Toronto Star and the National Post. He has written two Guest Essays for the New York Times on the wars in Ukraine and Gaza.

== Selected publications ==
=== Books and book chapters ===
- Air Power in UN Operations: Wings for Peace, 2014.
- Keeping Watch: Monitoring, Technology and Innovation in UN Peace Operations, United Nations Press, 2011 (full pdf).
- UN Peacekeeping Intelligence, chapter in 'Oxford Handbook', Oxford University Press, 2011. (OUP access) (pdf1) (pdf2)
- World Order for a New Millennium: Political, Cultural and Spiritual Approaches to Building Peace, St Martin's Press and MacMillan Press, 1999.

=== Reports and articles ===
- The Cuban Missile Crisis Resolved
- Who is Dying for Peace?
- Canadian Peacekeeping: No Myth But Not What It Once Was
- Canada pulls out of peacekeeping
- Afghanistan and UN Peacekeeping - Testimony to the Foreign Affairs Committee
- Intelligence and Peacekeeping: The UN Operation in the Congo 1960-64
- Intelligence and the Operation in Eastern Zaire 1996
- Intelligence-Gathering in UN Peacekeeping: The Limits
- Militias in East Timor: Personal Encounters
- Preventing the Bloodbath: Could the UN have Predicted & Prevented the Rwanda Genocide?
- Unprepared for Peace? Canadian Training for Peacekeeping (pdf) (html) (Fr) (CCPA) (Toronto Star Editorial (subscription required))Hinduism’s rules of armed conflict and int. humanitarian law (Int. Rev. Red Cross, CUP) (html) (pdf)
- Hinduism’s rules of armed conflict and int. humanitarian law (Int. Rev. Red Cross, CUP)

A more complete set of references is found on the publications page of Dorn's website.
