= Alan Macnaughton =

Canadian politician (1903–1999)

The Honourable Alan Macnaughton PC OC QC
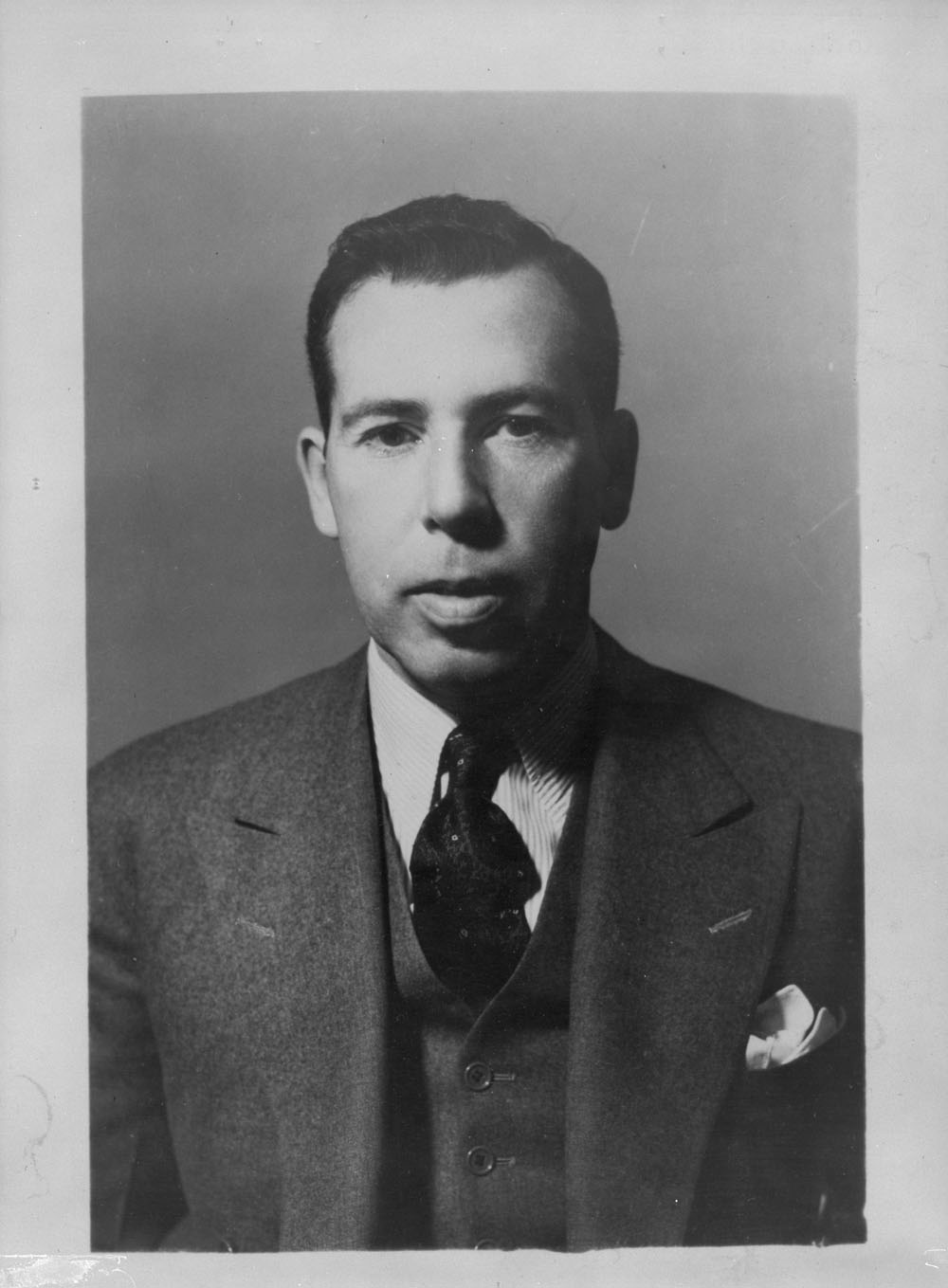
- Macnaughton, c. 1942–1948

26th Speaker of the House of Commons of Canada
- In office May 16, 1963 – January 17, 1966
- Preceded by: Marcel Lambert
- Succeeded by: Lucien Lamoureux

Member of Parliament for Mount Royal
- In office June 27, 1949 – November 7, 1965
- Preceded by: Frederick Whitman
- Succeeded by: Pierre Trudeau

Senator for Saurel, Quebec
- In office July 8, 1966 – July 30, 1978
- Appointed by: Lester B. Pearson
- Preceded by: Mariana Beauchamp Jodoin
- Succeeded by: Fernand Leblanc

Personal details
- Born: Alan Aylesworth Macnaughton; July 30, 1903 Greater Napanee, Ontario, Canada
- Died: July 16, 1999 (aged 95)
- Party: Liberal

Alan Aylesworth Macnaughton PC OC QC (July 30, 1903 – July 16, 1999) was a Canadian lawyer and politician who served as Speaker of the House of Commons of Canada from 1963 to 1966.

== Life and career ==
Macnaughton was born in Greater Napanee, Ontario, and educated at Upper Canada College. He studied law at McGill University (BCL 1929) and began a law practice in Montreal, where he served as a Crown Attorney from 1933 to 1942.

Macnaughton first won a seat in the House of Commons of Canada in the 1949 election, when he was returned as a Liberal Member of Parliament (MP) for the riding of Mount Royal. Macnaughton served as Chairman of the Public Accounts Committee after the 1958 election, and his performance in that position led to the newly elected Liberal government nominating him for the position of Speaker following the 1963 election.

Macnaughton presided over a House of Commons led by a minority government in which no party had control of the House, resulting in long and bitter debates that made it a challenge for any Speaker to maintain order.

Acrimonious debates included that over the adoption of a new flag of Canada, as well as scandals like the Munsinger affair. As Speaker, he attempted to bring in procedural reforms to make Parliament more efficient. He established four subcommittees of the Special Committee on Procedure and Organization, each chaired by a member of a different political party (Liberal, Progressive-Conservative, Social Credit, and New Democrat). The result of this process were recommendations for new procedures of time allocation in debates, a new committee structure, the abolition of the right to appeal rulings of the Speaker, research budgets for members and other changes, most of which were ultimately implemented.

During the Flag Debate, Macnaughton set a precedent by allowing the motion to be split into two and allowing separate motions on making the Maple Leaf the new flag and using the Union Flag as a symbol of Canada's membership in the Commonwealth of Nations. This was the first time a Speaker took it upon his own authority to split a motion. Macnaughton did so in the hope of facilitating debate and calming the House.

Late in his term as Speaker, he served as a production consultant on the politically-themed CBC Television drama series Quentin Durgens, M.P..

Macnaughton did not contest the 1965 election, and retired from electoral politics. Future prime minister Pierre Trudeau succeeded him as MP for Mount Royal.

In 1966, Prime Minister Lester B. Pearson recommended that Macnaughton be appointed to a seat in the Senate of Canada. He served in that body until his retirement in 1978. In 1994, he was made an Officer of the Order of Canada.

In 1967, Macnaughton founded World Wildlife Fund Canada (WWF-Canada), which is the Canadian branch of the global conservation organization, World Wide Fund for Nature (formerly named World Wildlife Fund).

== Archives ==
There is an Alan Macnaughton fonds at Library and Archives Canada.

== Arms ==
Coat of arms of Alan Macnaughton
| Crest Issuant from the waves of the sea proper a tower embattled Gules Escutcheon Argent on a fess Gules between a dexter hand fessways proper holding a cross crosslet fitchée Azure in dexter chief and a tower embattled Gules in sinister chief and a gauntlet fessways Azure grasping a maple leaf slipped Gules in base, a parliamentary mace fessways Or Supporters On a grassy mound proper two elks (Cervus canadensis) Or each charged at the shoulder with a cross crosslet fitchée Azure Motto IN GOD I TRUST Orders Officer of the Order of Canada: Desiderantes meliorem patriam (English for 'They desire a better country') |
