= Parliamentarians for Global Action =

International network of legislators

- Founded: 1978 in Washington, D.C. by a group of parliamentarians from around the world
- Headquarters: New York City, United States
- Revenue: 1,742,444 (2019)
- Website: www.pgaction.org

Parliamentarians for Global Action (PGA) is a non-profit, non-partisan international network of committed legislators, that informs and mobilizes parliamentarians in all regions of the world to advocate for human rights and the rule of law, democracy, human security, non-discrimination, gender equality, and climate justice. PGA Membership is open to individual legislators from elected parliaments. Currently, it consists of approximately 1,200 members in 139 parliaments. PGA was established in 1978 in Washington, D.C., by a group of concerned parliamentarians from around the world to "take collective, coordinated and cohesive actions on global problems, which could not be successfully addressed by any one government or parliament acting alone". Founded during the Cold War era, the organization was initially focused on nuclear disarmament. The vision of PGA is "to contribute to the creation of a Rules-Based International Order for a more equitable, safe, and democratic world".

The main office of PGA is located in New York City, while the seat of the PGA Foundation is in The Hague (The Netherlands), in proximity to the International Court of Justice, The Hague Academy of International Law and the International Criminal Court.

PGA promoted the establishment of a permanent international criminal court since 1989 and the ratification of the International Criminal Court treaty - the Rome Statute - and its full implementation in national legislations. PGA has contributed to the ratification of 78 out of 123 States Parties to the Rome Statute to the ICC and the adoption of domestic legislation implementing the Rome Statute in 37 countries.

The most important event of the PGA International Law and Human Rights Programme is the Consultative Assembly of Parliamentarians for the International Criminal Court and Rule of Law (CAP-ICC). From 2002 to 2004, the Consultative Assembly met on an annual basis in 2002 in Ottawa, in 2003 in New York, and in 2004 in New Zealand. Under its current biennial format, the fourth session took place in Japan (2006), the fifth in Santo Domingo (2008), the sixth in Kampala, Uganda (2010), the seventh in Rome, Italy (2012), and the eighth session is planned to take place in Rabat, Morocco in December 2014.

PGA’s Peace and Democracy Program focuses on marshaling global parliamentary support for improved regulation of the international arms trade, in particular where its inadequacies play a demonstrated role in destabilizing countries, causing or fuelling conflict and/or delay the emergence of countries from conflict. In particular, PGA Members worldwide advocate in favor of improved regulation of Small Arms and Light Weapons (SALW) exports through strengthened domestic legislation, broader adherence to relevant regional Conventions, and the UN Programme of Action on SALW. As of November 5, 2014, PGA Members have made important contributions to moving the Arms Trade Treaty (ATT) signature process forward in 40 of the 122 UN Member States that have signed the ATT, and in 24 of the 54 UN Member States that have ratified the ATT to date.

PGA's Gender, Equality, and Inclusion Programme promotes human dignity and the human rights principles of equality and non-discrimination to build communities where women and men have equal value. The programme focuses on promoting and protecting the rights of women and girls, especially by addressing harmful traditional practices like early, child and/or forced marriage and female genital mutilation; and countering discrimination based on sexual orientation and gender identity. In 2014, the GEP launched a Parliamentary Campaign against Discrimination based on Sexual Orientation and Gender Identity.

PGA includes among its membership a concentration of high-level politicians, including past and present Prime Ministers, Cabinet Ministers, and Chairs of Finance, Foreign Affairs, Human Rights, Population, Health, and Defense Committees. Many of PGA's members have left parliament for higher government posts such as the Presidencies of Albania, Botswana, Iceland, the Philippines, Trinidad & Tobago, Prime Ministership of New Zealand and Pakistan, and Vice Presidency of Dominican Republic. The recently elected vice-president of the Commission and High Representative on Foreign and Security Policy of the European Union, H.E. Federica Mogherini of Italy, was also an active PGA Member prior to taking up this position.

== Activities ==
=== Programmes ===
PGA's programmes have included:

- International Law and Human Rights
- International Peace and Security
- Gender, Equality, and Population
- Democratic Renewal and Human Rights Campaign

=== Campaigns ===
The organization's campaigns have included:

- Campaign to Promote Nuclear and Radiological Security
- Global Cybersecurity Initiative
- Campaign to Address the Illicit Trade in Small Arms and Light Weapons (SALW) and to Promote Universality and Implementation of the Arms Trade Treaty (ATT)
- Campaign in Support of the Negotiation of a Treaty Prohibiting Fully Autonomous Weapons (FAWs)
- Campaign for Universality and Implementation of the Biological Weapons Convention (BWC) & Implementation of UN Security Council Resolution 1540 (2004)

== Donors ==
Parliamentarians for Global Action (PGA) receives core funding from SIDA, Stewart R. Mott Foundation, OAK Foundation, the European Commission, and UN Trust Facility Supporting Cooperation on Arms Regulation (UNSCAR). Funding is also provided by the governments of Canada, Denmark, The Netherlands, Norway, Switzerland, and Liechtenstein, as well as from a number of other foundations and private institutions.

== In the media ==
- RWCHR files complaint to UN on behalf of Dawit Isaak and his colleagues.
- Des parlementaires du monde entier pour faire avancer la justice pénale mondiale et soutenir la CPI.
- Southern California nun receives Presidential Medal of Freedom
- Boris O. Dittrich: “Een docu over Harvey Milk heeft mij wakker gekust” Over ‘Mandaat’: memoires van een activist.
- De Lima thanks int’l group of parliamentarians for renewing call for her release.
- CAISO wants more protection, safe houses for LGBTQI+ community.
- Opposition leader writes to PGA to express concerns about democracy in T&T.
- MP SPEAKS | M'sia should ratify treaties to protect our fisherfolk, oceans.
- Piden a CPI que verifique actuación de Fuerzas Militares en casos de violencia sexual.
