= Mount Royal (electoral district) =

Federal electoral district in Quebec, Canada

Coordinates: 45°31′00″N 73°38′30″W

Quebec electoral district
- Interactive map of riding boundaries from the 2025 federal election

Federal electoral district
- Legislature: House of Commons
MP
Anthony Housefather
Liberal
- District created: 1924
- First contested: 1925
- Last contested: 2025
- District webpage: profile, map

Demographics
- Population (2016): 103,320
- Electors (2019): 73,163
- Area (km²): 23
- Pop. density (per km²): 4,492.2
- Census division: Montreal
- Census subdivision(s): Montreal (part), Côte Saint-Luc, Mont Royal, Hampstead

Mount Royal (French: Mont-Royal, pronounced [mɔ̃ ʁwajal]) is a federal electoral district in Quebec, Canada, that has been represented in the House of Commons of Canada since 1925. Its population in 2006 was 98,888.

The Liberals have held the riding continuously since 1940, and have only been seriously threatened three times since then—in 1958, 1984 and 2011, however the Conservatives are stronger here than in other Montreal area ridings due to Jewish-Canadian voters swinging right in the 21st century.

Its best-known MP is former Prime Minister Pierre Trudeau, who represented the riding from 1965 to 1984. Its current MP, Anthony Housefather, was elected on 19 October 2015, garnering 50.3% of the vote, and was profiled as one of 10 rookie MPs to watch in the new parliament. Mr. Housefather has won, since then, three more races, tallying 56.4% of the vote in 2019, 57.7% in 2021, and 51.1% in 2025.

The riding has a large Jewish population, the second-largest in Canada at 21.3 percent behind Thornhill.

== Geography ==
The district includes the City of Côte Saint-Luc, the Towns of Mount Royal and Hampstead, the neighbourhood of Snowdon and the western part of the neighbourhood of Côte-des-Neiges in the city of Montreal, Quebec.

== Demographics ==
According to the 2011 Canadian census

Ethnic groups: 62.1% White, 10.8% Filipino, 6.3% Black, 5.5% South Asian, 3.4% Arab, 3.3% Southeast Asian, 2.9% Chinese, 2.1% Latino, 1.2% West Asian, 2.4% Other
Languages: 33.0% English, 23.8% French, 5.4% Tagalog, 4.2% Russian, 3.5% Arabic, 2.9% Spanish, 2.4% Chinese, 2.2% Romanian, 1.9% Tamil, 1.8% Vietnamese, 1.7% Hebrew, 1.7% Yiddish, 1.6% Italian, 1.4% Bengali, 1.2% Greek, 1.2% Persian, 10.1% Other
Religions: 44.4% Christian, 30.7% Jewish, 7.4% Muslim, 2.8% Hindu, 2.1% Buddhist, 0.3% Other, 12.3% None
Median income: $24,313 (2010)
Average income: $48,466 (2010)

According to the 2016 Canadian census

- 2016 mother tongue languages (top twenty) : 31.5% English, 25.1% French, 5.8% Tagalog. 3.8% Arabic, 3.8% Russian, 2.8% Spanish, 2.2% Farsi, 2.1% Romanian, 1.8% Vietnamese, 1.8% Mandarin, 1.6% Italian, 1.6% Hebrew, 1.5% Tamil, 1.3% Bengali, 1.2% Greek, 1.1% Yiddish, 0.7% Hungarian, 0.7% Cantonese, 0.6% Portuguese, 0.5% Korean, 0.5% Polish, 0.5% Creole languages

== History ==
The electoral district was created in 1924 mostly from Jacques-Cartier, Westmount—Saint-Henri and Laurier—Outremont ridings, with small parts taken from St. Antoine and St. Lawrence—St. George. The electoral district was actually abolished twice since 1924, in 1966 and in 1987; however, the district to replace it kept the same name and incumbent both times. Between the 1935 and 1949 elections, the riding did not contain any of the Town of Mount Royal, and was instead based in Notre-Dame-de-Grâce and Montreal West.

This riding remained largely intact during the 2012 electoral redistribution, losing a small (uninhabited) territory to Outremont. The riding's English name was eliminated in the redistribution, but was reversed by the Riding Name Change Act, 2014.

Following the 2022 Canadian federal electoral redistribution, the riding gained the territory south of Boul. Décaire and west of Ch. Côte-Saint-Luc from Notre-Dame-de-Grâce—Westmount.

=== Former boundaries ===
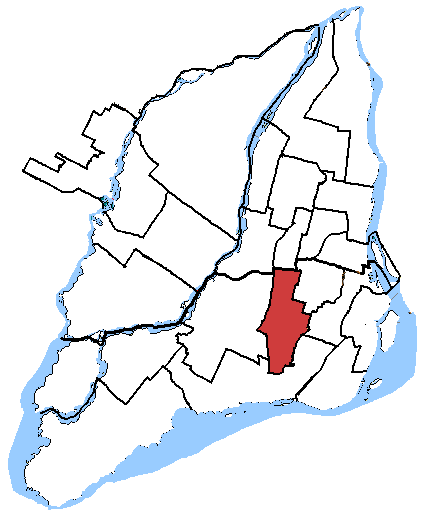
2004 to 2011 election

=== Members of Parliament ===
This riding has elected the following members of Parliament:

Parliament	Years	Member	Party
Mount Royal; Riding created from Jacques-Cartier, Laurier—Outremont, Westmount—St. Henri, St. Antoine and St. Lawrence—St. George
15th	1925–1926	Robert Smeaton White	Conservative
16th	1926–1930	Robert Smeaton White	Conservative
17th	1930–1935	Robert Smeaton White	Conservative
18th	1935–1940	William Allen Walsh	Conservative
19th	1940–1945	Fred Whitman	Liberal
20th	1945–1949	Fred Whitman	Liberal
21st	1949–1953	Alan Macnaughton	Liberal
22nd	1953–1957	Alan Macnaughton	Liberal
23rd	1957–1958	Alan Macnaughton	Liberal
24th	1958–1962	Alan Macnaughton	Liberal
25th	1962–1963	Alan Macnaughton	Liberal
26th	1963–1965	Alan Macnaughton	Liberal
27th	1965–1968	Pierre Trudeau	Liberal
28th	1968–1972	Pierre Trudeau	Liberal
29th	1972–1974	Pierre Trudeau	Liberal
30th	1974–1979	Pierre Trudeau	Liberal
31st	1979–1980	Pierre Trudeau	Liberal
32nd	1980–1984	Pierre Trudeau	Liberal
33rd	1984–1988	Sheila Finestone	Liberal
34th	1988–1993	Sheila Finestone	Liberal
35th	1993–1997	Sheila Finestone	Liberal
36th	1997–1999	Sheila Finestone	Liberal
36th	1999–2000	Irwin Cotler	Liberal
37th	2000–2004	Irwin Cotler	Liberal
38th	2004–2006	Irwin Cotler	Liberal
39th	2006–2008	Irwin Cotler	Liberal
40th	2008–2011	Irwin Cotler	Liberal
41st	2011–2015	Irwin Cotler	Liberal
42nd	2015–2019	Anthony Housefather	Liberal
43rd	2019–2021	Anthony Housefather	Liberal
44th	2021–2025	Anthony Housefather	Liberal
45th	2025–present	Anthony Housefather	Liberal

== Election results ==
2025 Canadian federal election
Party	Candidate	Votes	%	±%	Expenditures
Liberal	Anthony Housefather	25,544	51.06	−6.35	$86,551.70
Conservative	Neil Oberman	20,244	40.47	+16.40	$123,088.34
New Democratic	Adam Frank	2,353	4.70	−4.13	$5,334.51
Bloc Québécois	Yegor Komarov	1,671	3.34	−0.73	$3,221.59
Marxist–Leninist	Diane Johnston	216	0.43	+0.20	$0.00
Total valid votes/expense limit		49,028	98.74	–	$125,466.16
Total rejected ballots		871	1.26		
Turnout		49,899	64.84		
Eligible voters		76,951			
Liberal hold		Swing		+11.38	
Source: Elections Canada
Note: number of eligible voters does not include voting day registrations.

2021 federal election redistributed results
Party	Vote	%
Liberal	23,987	57.41
Conservative	10,057	24.07
New Democratic	3,689	8.83
Bloc Québécois	1,701	4.07
Green	1,142	2.73
People's	1,107	2.65
Others	101	0.24

2021 Canadian federal election
Party	Candidate	Votes	%	±%	Expenditures
Liberal	Anthony Housefather	23,292	57.71	+1.42	$93,203.95
Conservative	Frank Cavallaro	9,871	24.46	-0.47	$16,697.71
New Democratic	Ibrahim Bruno El-Khoury	3,378	8.37	+0.11	$575.63
Bloc Québécois	Yegor Komarov	1,582	3.92	-0.10	$2,242.01
Green	Clement Badra	1,085	2.78	-2.69	$638.61
People's	Zachary Lozoff	1,053	2.61	+1.78	$0.00
Marxist–Leninist	Diane Johnston	96	0.24	+0.04	$0.00
Total valid votes/expense limit		40,357	–	–	$107,092.98
Total rejected ballots					
Turnout		56.72	-3.69		
Eligible voters		71,153			
Liberal hold		Swing		+0.94	
Source: Elections Canada

2019 Canadian federal election
Party	Candidate	Votes	%	±%	Expenditures
Liberal	Anthony Housefather	24,590	56.30	+5.95	$75,605.49
Conservative	David Tordjman	10,887	24.93	-12.96	$80,742.48
New Democratic	Eric-Abel Baland	3,609	8.26	+0.18	none listed
Green	Clément Badra	2,389	5.47	+3.92	$4,397.05
Bloc Québécois	Xavier Levesque	1,757	4.02	+2.12	none listed
People's	Zachary Lozoff	362	0.83	–	$0.00
Marxist–Leninist	Diane Johnston	85	0.19	-0.07	$0.00
Total valid votes/expense limit		43,679	98.68		
Total rejected ballots		583	1.32		
Turnout		44,262	60.41		
Eligible voters		73,273			
Liberal hold		Swing		+9.46	
Source: Elections Canada

2015 Canadian federal election
Party	Candidate	Votes	%	±%	Expenditures
Liberal	Anthony Housefather	24,187	50.34	+8.93	$95,380.32
Conservative	Robert Libman	18,201	37.88	+2.27	$157,866.00
New Democratic	Mario Jacinto Rimbao	3,884	8.08	-9.77	$8,395.91
Bloc Québécois	Jade Bossé-Bélanger	908	1.90	-1.01	$198.94
Green	Timothy Landry	747	1.55	-0.20	–
Marxist–Leninist	Diane Johnston	124	0.26	-0.02	–
Total valid votes/Expense limit		48,051	100.00	–	$207,183.11
Total rejected ballots		425	0.88	–	–
Turnout		48,476	65.18	+7.54	–
Eligible voters		74,374	–	–	–
Liberal hold		Swing		+6.66	
Source: Elections Canada

2011 Canadian federal election
Party	Candidate	Votes	%	±%	Expenditures
Liberal	Irwin Cotler	16,151	41.41	-14.24	–
Conservative	Saulie Zajdel	13,891	35.61	+8.28	–
New Democratic	Jeff Itcush	6,963	17.85	+10.13	–
Bloc Québécois	Gabriel Dumais	1,136	2.91	-1.45	–
Green	Brian Sarwer-Foner	683	1.75	-2.67	–
Marxist–Leninist	Diane Johnston	109	0.28	+0.01	–
Independent	Abraham Weizfeld	74	0.19	–	–
Total valid votes/Expense limit		39,007	100.00	–	–
Total rejected ballots		312	0.79	+0.04	–
Turnout		39,319	57.64	+5.34	–

2008 Canadian federal election
Party	Candidate	Votes	%	±%	Expenditures
Liberal	Irwin Cotler	19,702	55.65	-9.90	$70,302
Conservative	Rafael Tzoubari	9,676	27.33	+9.43	$63,120
New Democratic	Nicolas Thibodeau	2,733	7.72	+1.02	$3,089
Green	Tyrell Alexander	1,565	4.42	+0.57	$600
Bloc Québécois	Maryse Lavallée	1,543	4.36	-1.35	$6,931
Marxist–Leninist	Diane Johnston	97	0.27	-0.02	
Communist	Antonio Artuso	89	0.25	–	$907
Total valid votes/Expense limit		35,405	100.00	–	$80,838
Total rejected ballots		268	0.75	+0.06	–
Turnout		35,673	52.30	-0.51	–

2006 Canadian federal election
Party	Candidate	Votes	%	±%	Expenditures
Liberal	Irwin Cotler	24,248	65.55	-10.13	$66,099
Conservative	Neil Martin Drabkin	6,621	17.90	+9.27	$41,404
New Democratic	Nicolas Thibodeau	2,479	6.70	+1.79	$2,810
Bloc Québécois	Guillaume Dussault	2,112	5.71	-1.25	$8,542
Green	Damien Pichereau	1,423	3.85	+1.09	
Marxist–Leninist	Diane Johnston	106	0.29	+0.04	
Total valid votes/Expense limit		36,989	100.00	–	$75,740
Total rejected ballots		241	0.65	-0.18	–
Turnout		37,230	52.81	-0.59	–

2004 Canadian federal election
Party	Candidate	Votes	%	±%	Expenditures
Liberal	Irwin Cotler	28,670	75.68	-5.56	$79,191
Conservative	Matthew Fireman	3,271	8.63	-1.02	$16,501
Bloc Québécois	Vincent Gagnon	2,636	6.96	+2.69	$5,960
New Democratic	Sébastien Beaudet	1,859	4.91	+2.37	$2,199
Green	Adam Sommerfeld	1,046	2.76	+1.09	
Marijuana	Adam Greenblatt	308	0.81	–	
Marxist–Leninist	Diane Johnston	94	0.25	–	
Total valid votes/Expense limit		37,884	100.00	–	$74,792
Total rejected ballots		317	0.83	–	–
Turnout		38,201	53.40	–	–

Note: Conservative vote is compared to the total of the Canadian Alliance vote and Progressive Conservative vote in 2000 election.

2000 Canadian federal election
Party	Candidate	Votes	%	±%
Liberal	Irwin Cotler	33,118	81.24	-10.74
Progressive Conservative	Stephane Gelgoot	2,489	6.11	+2.34
Bloc Québécois	Jean-Sebastien Houle	1,740	4.27	+2.03
Alliance	Alex Gabanski	1,444	3.54	
New Democratic	Maria Pia Chávez	1,034	2.54	+0.52
Green	Jean-Claude Balu	681	1.67	
Communist	Judith Chafoya	140	0.34	
Natural Law	Ena Kahn	122	0.30	
Total valid votes		40,768	100.00	–

Canadian federal by-election, 15 November 1999 Resignation of Sheila Finestone
Party	Candidate	Votes	%	±%
Liberal	Irwin Cotler	15,820	91.98	+29.72
Progressive Conservative	Noel Earl Alexander	648	3.77	-6.58
Bloc Québécois	Mathieu Alarie	385	2.24	-1.86
New Democratic	Serge Granger	347	2.02	+0.02
Total valid votes		17,200	100.00	–

Note: Canadian Alliance vote is compared to the Reform vote in 1997 election.

1997 Canadian federal election
Party	Candidate	Votes	%	±%
Liberal	Sheila Finestone	30,115	62.26	-20.68
Independent	Howard Galganov	10,090	20.86	
Progressive Conservative	Carolyn Steinman	5,006	10.35	+4.57
Bloc Québécois	Jacques Thibaudeau	1,981	4.10	-2.86
New Democratic	Adam Giambrone	966	2.00	+0.33
Natural Law	Ena Kahn	211	0.44	-0.21
Total valid votes		48,369	100.00	–

1993 Canadian federal election
Party	Candidate	Votes	%	±%
Liberal	Sheila Finestone	39,598	82.94	+23.09
Bloc Québécois	Guillaume Dumas	3,324	6.96	
Progressive Conservative	Neil Drabkin	2,758	5.78	-26.17
New Democratic	Michael Richard Werbowski	796	1.67	-3.70
Independent	Harry Polansky	537	1.12	
Natural Law	Ken Matthews	312	0.65	
National	Kurtis Law	300	0.63	
Commonwealth of Canada	Georges Duchesnay	71	0.15	-0.09
Abolitionist	Marie Vienneau	47	0.10	
Total valid votes		47,743	100.00	–

1988 Canadian federal election
Party	Candidate	Votes	%	±%
Liberal	Sheila Finestone	27,354	59.85	+12.38
Progressive Conservative	Robert Presser	14,601	31.95	-7.14
New Democratic	Tariq Alvi	2,455	5.37	-4.52
Rhinoceros	Lady Be Ann Poulin	512	1.12	-0.50
Green	Daniel Reicher	438	0.96	
Independent	Barry Goodman	165	0.36	
Commonwealth of Canada	Paul G. Fraleigh	108	0.24	+0.07
Independent	Abe Rosner	68	0.15	
Total valid votes		45,701	100.00	–

1984 Canadian federal election
Party	Candidate	Votes	%	±%
Liberal	Sheila Finestone	22,716	47.47	-33.76
Progressive Conservative	Sharon Wolfe	18,707	39.09	+28.52
New Democratic	Nancy Pearson	4,735	9.89	+4.23
Rhinoceros	Claude Parachute Racine	776	1.62	-0.10
Parti nationaliste	André Daoust	392	0.82	
Libertarian	Victor Lévis	338	0.71	+0.41
Independent	Mark Sholzberg	110	0.23	
Commonwealth of Canada	Guy R. Huard	80	0.17	
Total valid votes		47,854	100.00	–

1980 Canadian federal election
Party	Candidate	Votes	%	±%
Liberal	Pierre Trudeau	33,821	81.23	-3.9
Progressive Conservative	Harry Bloomfield	4,402	10.57	+3.4
New Democratic	David C. Winch	2,356	5.66	+1.7
Rhinoceros	Michel Flybin Rivard	715	1.72	+0.4
Independent	Gordon Edwards	149	0.36	
Libertarian	Eddie Paul	126	0.30	
Marxist–Leninist	Liz Watkins	68	0.16	+0.0
Total valid votes		41,637	100.00	–

1979 Canadian federal election
Party	Candidate	Votes	%	±%
Liberal	Pierre Trudeau	43,202	85.2	+10.2
Progressive Conservative	J. David Dejong	3,660	7.2	-6.1
New Democratic	David C. Winch	2,023	4.0	-5.8
Social Credit	Laflèche Trudeau	1,049	2.1	1.1
Rhinoceros	Jacques Ferron	649	1.3	
Communist	David G. Johnston	81	0.2	
Marxist–Leninist	Robert Verrier	61	0.1	-0.3
Total valid votes		50,725	100.0	–

1974 Canadian federal election
Party	Candidate	Votes	%	±%
Liberal	Pierre Trudeau	32,166	75.0	-5.6
Progressive Conservative	Émile Mashaal	5,723	13.3	+3.6
New Democratic	Joe Rabinovitch	4,214	9.8	+2.7
Social Credit	Bertrand Marcil	414	1.0	-0.4
Independent	Edward J. Sommer	211	0.5	
Marxist–Leninist	Robert A. Cruise	162	0.4	+0.2
Total valid votes		42,890	100.0	–

1972 Canadian federal election
Party	Candidate	Votes	%	±%
Liberal	Pierre Trudeau	36,875	80.6	-10.1
Progressive Conservative	Andrew Albert Brichant	4,446	9.7	+5.0
New Democratic	Harry Yudin	3,274	7.2	+3.3
Social Credit	Alexander O. Bronstein	625	1.4	+1.2
Independent	Gaston Miron	433	0.9	
Independent	Robert A. Cruise	80	0.2	
Total valid votes		45,733	100.0	–

Note: Social Credit vote is compared to Ralliement créditiste vote in the 1968 election.

1968 Canadian federal election
Party	Candidate	Votes	%	±%
Liberal	Pierre Trudeau	37,402	90.8	+35.1
Progressive Conservative	Huguette Marleau	1,965	4.8	-8.8
New Democratic	Jussy Brainin	1,583	3.8	-25.8
Independent	Walter Gallagher	182	0.4	
Ralliement créditiste	Michel Lamonde	80	0.2	-1.0
Total valid votes		41,212	100.0	–

1965 Canadian federal election
Party	Candidate	Votes	%	±%
Liberal	Pierre Trudeau	28,064	55.6	-14.7
New Democratic	Charles Taylor	14,929	29.6	+13.1
Progressive Conservative	Peter S. Wise	6,840	13.6	+2.9
Ralliement créditiste	Michel Smith	598	1.2	-1.3
Total valid votes		50,431	100.0	

Note: Ralliement créditiste vote is compared to Social Credit vote in the 1963 election.

1963 Canadian federal election
Party	Candidate	Votes	%	±%
Liberal	Alan Macnaughton	37,648	70.4	+7.3
New Democratic	Charles Taylor	8,855	16.5	+3.8
Progressive Conservative	Thomas Joseph Coonan	5,693	10.6	-12.0
Social Credit	Austin G. Gordon	1,318	2.5	+0.8
Total valid votes		53,514	100.0	

1962 Canadian federal election
Party	Candidate	Votes	%	±%
Liberal	Alan Macnaughton	31,654	63.0	+14.6
Progressive Conservative	Stanley Shenkman	11,352	22.6	-24.7
New Democratic	Charles Taylor	6,388	12.7	+8.4
Social Credit	Henri-J. Bernard	845	1.7	
Total valid votes		50,239	100.0	

Note: NDP vote is compared to CCF vote in 1958 election.

1958 Canadian federal election
Party	Candidate	Votes	%	±%
Liberal	Alan Macnaughton	22,051	48.4	-12.0
Progressive Conservative	Reginald J. Dawson	21,562	47.3	+11.4
Co-operative Commonwealth	Harold Atwill	1,952	4.3	+0.6
Total valid votes		45,565	100.0	

1957 Canadian federal election
Party	Candidate	Votes	%	±%
Liberal	Alan Macnaughton	23,330	60.4	-1.2
Progressive Conservative	George Brown	13,861	35.9	+2.0
Co-operative Commonwealth	Harold Atwill	1,420	3.7	+1.9
Total valid votes		38,611	100.0	

1953 Canadian federal election
Party	Candidate	Votes	%	±%
Liberal	Alan Macnaughton	17,183	61.7	-2.2
Progressive Conservative	Dudley Holden Kerr	9,460	33.9	-0.1
Labor–Progressive	Norman Nerenberg	727	2.6	
Co-operative Commonwealth	Ross Worrall	500	1.8	-0.3
Total valid votes		27,870	100.0	

1949 Canadian federal election
Party	Candidate	Votes	%
Liberal	Alan Macnaughton	21,654	63.8
Progressive Conservative	Earle Moore	11,550	34.0
Co-operative Commonwealth	Ross Edward Worrall	719	2.1
Total valid votes		33,923	100.0

1945 Canadian federal election
Party	Candidate	Votes	%	±%
Liberal	Frederick Primrose Whitman	20,925	46.76	-9.72
Progressive Conservative	St. Clair Holland	17,798	39.77	+1.89
Co-operative Commonwealth	John Stanley Allen	3,608	8.06	+2.42
Independent PC	Gilbert Layton	1,270	2.84	
Labor–Progressive	Beryl Truax	1,147	2.56	
Total valid votes		44,748	100.0	
Liberal hold		Swing		-5.80

Note: Progressive Conservative vote is compared to "National Government" vote in 1940 election.

1940 Canadian federal election
Party	Candidate	Votes	%	±%
Liberal	Frederick Primrose Whitman	19,858	56.48	+19.96
National Government	William Allen Walsh	13,319	37.88	-11.57
Co-operative Commonwealth	John Stanley Allen	1,983	5.64	+1.14
Total valid votes		35,160	100.0	
Liberal gain from Conservative		Swing		+15.76

Note: "National Government" vote is compared to Conservative vote in 1935 election.

1935 Canadian federal election
Party	Candidate	Votes	%	±%
Conservative	William Allen Walsh	16,203	49.44	-26.01
Liberal	Adam Kirk Cameron	11,967	36.52	+11.98
Reconstruction	Clifford Henry Cheasley	2,782	8.49	
Co-operative Commonwealth	Lloyd B. Almond	1,473	4.50	
Independent	Thomas Henry Carveth	343	1.05	
Total valid votes		32,768	100.0	
Conservative hold		Swing		-18.99

1930 Canadian federal election
Party	Candidate	Votes	%	±%
Conservative	Robert Smeaton White	19,932	75.46	-0.55
Liberal	Octavia Grace Ritchie England	6,483	24.54	+0.55
Total valid votes		26,415	100.0	
Conservative hold		Swing		-0.55

1926 Canadian federal election
Party	Candidate	Votes	%	±%
Conservative	Robert Smeaton White	14,249	76.00	+6.33
Liberal	Thomas Henry Carveth	4,499	24.00	
Total valid votes		18,748	100.0	

1925 Canadian federal election
Party	Candidate	Votes	%
Conservative	Robert Smeaton White	16,377	69.67
Independent Liberal	Robert Louis Calder	7,129	30.33
Total valid votes		23,506	100.0

== See also ==
- List of Canadian electoral districts
- Historical federal electoral districts of Canada

Parliament of Canada
Preceded by Algoma East	Constituency represented by the prime minister 1968–1979	Succeeded by Yellowhead
Preceded by Yellowhead	Constituency represented by the prime minister 1980–1984	Succeeded by Manicouagan
