= New Democratic Party candidates in the 1984 Canadian federal election =

The New Democratic Party fielded a full slate of 282 candidates in the 1984 Canadian federal election, and won thirty seats to retain their status as the third-largest party in the House of Commons of Canada.

Many of the party's candidates have individual biography pages on Wikipedia. Information on others may be found here.

== Alberta ==
=== Calgary ===
| Riding | Candidate's Name | Notes | Residence | Occupation | Votes | % | Rank |
|---|---|---|---|---|---|---|---|
| Calgary Centre | Susan Keeley | | | | 5,138 | 13.68 | 3rd |
| Calgary East | Barry Pashak | ANDP candidate for Calgary-North Hill in the 1971 Alberta provincial election | | | 8,558 | 13.68 | 3rd |
| Calgary North | Pam Appleton | | | | 7,027 | | 2nd |
| Calgary South | Brendan Quigley | | | | 6,135 | 8.60 | 3rd |
| Calgary West | Ed Smith | | | | 5,409 | 10.76 | 3rd |

=== Edmonton ===
| Riding | Candidate's Name | Notes | Residence | Occupation | Votes | % | Rank |
|---|---|---|---|---|---|---|---|
| Edmonton East | Muriel Stanley Venne | | | | 7,668 | 23.06 | 2nd |
| Edmonton North | Garth Stevenson | | | | 12,305 | | 2nd |
| Edmonton South | Joanna L.H. Miazga | | | | 9,407 | | 2nd |
| Edmonton—Strathcona | Doris S. Burghardt | | | | 11,095 | 20.22 | 2nd |
| Edmonton West | Michael Moroz | | | | 7,339 | | 3rd |

=== Rural Alberta ===
| Riding | Candidate's Name | Notes | Residence | Occupation | Votes | % | Rank |
|---|---|---|---|---|---|---|---|
| Athabasca | Ann Dort-MacLean | | | | 6,001 | 17.08 | 2nd |
| Bow River | William McCutcheon | | | | 5,258 | 9.31 | 2nd |
| Crowfoot | L. Gladys Creasy | | | | 3,153 | 9.33 | 2nd |
| Lethbridge | Connie Credico | | | | 6,822 | 14.68 | 2nd |
| Medicine Hat | Wally Regehr | | | | 4,652 | 10.37 | 2nd |
| Peace River | Elroy Deimert | | | | 6,333 | 15.37 | 2nd |
| Pembina | Greg Daruda | | | | 9,792 | | 2nd |
| Red Deer | Clarence Lacombe | | | | 5,201 | 9.4 | 2nd |
| Vegreville | George Oleksiuk | | | | 3,793 | | 2nd |
| Wetaskiwin | Judy Mjolsness | | | | 5,596 | 13.2 | 2nd |
| Yellowhead | Rick Hardy | | | | 6,906 | 13.6 | 2nd |

== British Columbia ==
=== British Columbia Interior ===
| Riding | Candidate's Name | Notes | Residence | Occupation | Votes | % | Rank |
|---|---|---|---|---|---|---|---|
| Cariboo—Chilcotin | Christine Slater | | | | 11,544 | 30.62 | 2nd |
| Kamloops—Shuswap | Nelson Riis | Member of Parliament for Kamloops—Shuswap (1980–1988); Member of Kamloops City Council (1973–1978) | | Professor at Cariboo College | 30,512 | 54.08 | 1st |
| Kootenay East—Revelstoke | Sid Parker | Member of Parliament for Kootenay East—Revelstoke (1980–1984) | | | 15,908 | 40.80 | 2nd |
| Kootenay West | Lyle Kristiansen | Member of Parliament for Kootenay West (1980–1984) | | | 15,060 | 45.19 | 2nd |
| Okanagan North | Eileen Robinson | | | | 17,168 | 26.80 | 2nd |
| Okanagan—Similkameen | Peter J. Merry | | | | 15,181 | 29.28 | 2nd |
| Prince George—Bulkley Valley | Brian Gardiner | | | | 13,274 | 34.62 | 2nd |
| Prince George—Peace River | Jim Best | | | | 8,168 | 24.11 | 2nd |
| Skeena | Jim Fulton | Member of Parliament for Skeena (1979–1993) | | Probation officer | 14,174 | 45.79 | 1st |

=== Fraser Valley/Lower Mainland ===
| Riding | Candidate's Name | Notes | Residence | Occupation | Votes | % | Rank |
|---|---|---|---|---|---|---|---|
| Burnaby | Svend Robinson | Member of Parliament for Burnaby (1979–1988) | | Lawyer | 28,318 | 48.00 | 1st |
| Capilano | Larry Whaley | | | | 6,310 | 12.45 | 3rd |
| Fraser Valley East | David C. Menzies | | | | 12,779 | 23.87 | 2nd |
| Fraser Valley West | Joe Leclair | NDP candidate for Fraser Valley West in the 1980 federal election | | | 19,878 | 30.23 | 2nd |
| Mission—Port Moody | Tom Beardsley | | | | 25,925 | 40.17 | 2nd |
| New Westminster—Coquitlam | Pauline Jewett | Member of Parliament for New Westminster—Coquitlam (1979–1988) | | President of Simon Fraser University (1974–1978) | 21,134 | 46.18 | 1st |
| North Vancouver—Burnaby | David Schreck | | | | 12,812 | 25.70 | 3rd |
| Richmond—South Delta | Ron Dickson | | | | 16,377 | 24.48 | 2nd |
| Surrey—White Rock—North Delta | Mike Villeneuve | | | | 22,555 | | 2nd |
| Vancouver Centre | Johanna den Hertog | | | | 16,283 | 32.43 | 2nd |
| Vancouver East | Margaret Anne Mitchell | Member of Parliament for Vancouver East (1979–1993) | | | 16,283 | 32.43 | 1st |
| Vancouver Kingsway | Ian Waddell | Member of Parliament for Vancouver East (1979–1988) | | | 20,179 | 51.10 | 1st |
| Vancouver Quadra | Ray Cantillon | | | | 8,343 | 16.82 | 3rd |
| Vancouver South | Brian Ernest Emery | | | | 10,909 | 23.50 | 2nd |

=== Vancouver Island ===
| Riding | Candidate's Name | Notes | Residence | Occupation | Votes | % | Rank |
|---|---|---|---|---|---|---|---|
| Comox—Powell River | Raymond Skelly | Member of Parliament for Comox—Powell River (1979–1988) | | Teacher | 27,288 | 44.61 | 1st |
| Cowichan—Malahat—The Islands | Jim Manly | Member of Parliament for Cowichan—Malahat—The Islands (1980–1988) | | | 24,555 | 45.06 | 1st |
| Esquimalt—Saanich | Bob Cameron | NDP candidate for Esquimalt—Saanich in the 1980 and 1979 federal elections | | | 23,094 | 35.10 | 2nd |
| Nanaimo—Alberni | Ted Miller | Member of Parliament for Nanaimo—Alberni (1979–1984) | | Teacher | 25,659 | 42.88 | 2nd |
| Victoria | John Brewin | | | | 20,480 | 38.60 | 2nd |

== Manitoba ==
=== Rural Manitoba ===
| Riding | Candidate's Name | Notes | Residence | Occupation | Votes | % | Rank |
|---|---|---|---|---|---|---|---|
| Brandon-Souris | Jake Janzen | | | | 5,631 | 15.6 | 3rd |
| Churchill | Rod Murphy | Member of Parliament for Churchill (1979–1993) | | Teacher | 10,829 | 45.6 | 1st |
| Dauphin—Swan River | Laverne Lewycky | Member of Parliament for Dauphin—Swan River (1980–1984) | | | 10,219 | 36.32 | 2nd |
| Lisgar | Peter Hiebert | | | | 2,052 | | 4th |
| Portage—Marquette | Garry Grant | | | | 4,447 | | 3rd |
| Provencher | Ron Buzahora | | | | 6,941 | 20.1 | 2nd |
| Selkirk—Interlake | Terry Sargeant | Member of Parliament for Selkirk—Interlake (1979–1984) | | | 13,088 | 38.07 | 2nd |

=== Winnipeg ===
| Riding | Candidate's Name | Notes | Residence | Occupation | Votes | % | Rank |
|---|---|---|---|---|---|---|---|
| Saint Boniface | Armand T. Bédard | | | | 11,279 | 22.9 | 3rd |
| Winnipeg—Assiniboine | Robert Johannson | | | | 7,067 | | 3rd |
| Winnipeg—Birds Hill | Bill Blaikie | Member of Parliament for Winnipeg—Birds Hill (1979–1988) | | United Church minister | 23,903 | 45.81 | 1st |
| Winnipeg—Fort Garry | Gail Coyston | | | | 5,932 | 12.74 | 3rd |
| Winnipeg North | David Orlikow | Member of Parliament for Winnipeg—Birds Hill (1962–1988); Member of the Legislative Assembly of Manitoba for St. Johns (1958–1962); Member of Winnipeg City Council (1951–1958) | | | 18,209 | 43.3 | 1st |
| Winnipeg North Centre | Cyril Keeper | Member of Parliament for Winnipeg—St. James (1980–1984) | | | 10,559 | | 1st |
| Winnipeg—St. James | Lissa Donner | | | | 9,843 | | 2nd |

== New Brunswick ==
| Riding | Candidate's Name | Notes | Residence | Occupation | Votes | % | Rank |
|---|---|---|---|---|---|---|---|
| Carleton—Charlotte | Ben Kilfoil | | | | 4,608 | 14.2 | 3rd |
| Fundy—Royal | Kay Bedell | | | | 8,487 | 18.45 | 3rd |
| Gloucester | Valentine Ward | | | | 2,188 | 5.13 | 3rd |
| Madawaska—Victoria | Floranne McLaughlin-St-Amand | | | | 1,968 | 6.2 | 3rd |
| Moncton | Gregory Murphy | NDP candidate for Moncton in the 1980 and 1979 federal elections | | | 7,629 | 14.57 | 3rd |
| Northumberland—Miramichi | Jerry Dunnett | NDP candidate for Northumberland—Miramichi in the 1980 and 1979 federal elections | | | 2,660 | 8.37 | 3rd |
| Restigouche | Gilles Halley | | | | 4,526 | 14.7 | 3rd |
| Saint John | Mary Palmer | | | | 6,752 | 21.2 | 3rd |
| Westmorland—Kent | Claire Doiron | | | | 7,148 | 20.29 | 3rd |
| York—Sunbury | Allan Sharp | | | | 7,366 | 17.21 | 3rd |

== Newfoundland and Labrador ==
| Riding | Candidate's Name | Notes | Residence | Occupation | Votes | % | Rank |
|---|---|---|---|---|---|---|---|
| Bonavista-Trinity-Conception | Susan Maher | | | | 1,432 | 4.15 | 3rd |
| Burin-St. George's | L. Joseph Edwards | | | | 1,767 | | 3rd |
| Gander—Twillingate | Gerry Panting | Leader of the Newfoundland and Labrador New Democratic Party (1974–1977) | | | 1,138 | | 3rd |
| Grand Falls—White Bay—Labrador | Ern Condon | | | | 3,616 | 12.61 | 3rd |
| Humber—Port au Port—St. Barbe | Ken Gould | | | | 1,530 | | 3rd |
| St. John's East | Christine Oliver | | | | 2,584 | 6.56 | 3rd |
| St. John's West | Nina P. Patey | | | | 1,926 | 6.56 | 3rd |

== Nova Scotia ==
| Riding | Candidate's Name | Notes | Residence | Occupation | Votes | % | Rank |
|---|---|---|---|---|---|---|---|
| Annapolis Valley—Hants | Peggy Hope-Simpson | | | | 6,987 | 15.95 | 3rd |
| Cape Breton—East Richmond | Douglass L. Grant | | | | 3,709 | | 3rd |
| Cape Breton Highlands—Canso | Daniel W. MacInnes | | | | 4,308 | | 3rd |
| Cape Breton—The Sydneys | Ed Murphy | NDP candidate for Cape Breton—The Sydneys in the 1980 and 1979 federal elections | | | 6,673 | | 3rd |
| Central Nova | Gloria E. Murphy | | | | 4,572 | 13.00 | 3rd |
| Cumberland—Colchester | Jessie Mae McCarron | | | | 5,527 | 13.10 | 3rd |
| Dartmouth—Halifax East | Ken Hale | | | | 9,503 | 18.95 | 3rd |
| Halifax | Tessa Hebb | | | | 8,576 | 20.45 | 3rd |
| Halifax West | Dennis Theman | NDP candidate for Halifax West in the 1980 and 1979 federal elections | | | 11,626 | 20.84 | 3rd |
| South Shore | Bill Zimmerman | | | | 5,633 | 14.29 | 3rd |
| South West Nova | Bob Ritchie | | | | 3,076 | 7.55 | 3rd |

== Ontario ==
=== Central Ontario ===
| Riding | Candidate's Name | Notes | Residence | Occupation | Votes | % | Rank |
|---|---|---|---|---|---|---|---|
| Durham—Northumberland | Roy Grierson | | | | 7,805 | 18.55 | 3rd |
| Grey—Simcoe | Joan Stone | NDP candidate for Grey—Simcoe in the 1980 federal election | | | 6,001 | | 3rd |
| Northumberland | Bill Cassells | | | | 4,633 | | 3rd |
| Peterborough | Linda Slavin | | | | 10,648 | 20.7 | 3rd |
| Simcoe North | Tim Tynan | | | | 7,742 | 17.1 | 3rd |
| Simcoe South | Frank Berry | | | | 8,283 | | 3rd |
| Victoria–Haliburton | Patrick Daniel | NDP candidate for Victoria–Haliburton in the 1980 and 1979 federal elections | | | 8,682 | 17.5 | 3rd |

=== Eastern Ontario/Ottawa ===
| Riding | Candidate's Name | Notes | Residence | Occupation | Votes | % | Rank |
|---|---|---|---|---|---|---|---|
| Glengarry—Prescott—Russell | Annemarie Collard | | | | 6,838 | 13.9 | 3rd |
| Hastings—Frontenac—Lennox and Addington | Donna Forth | | | | 5,349 | | 3rd |
| Kingston and the Islands | Andrew Currie | | | | 5,950 | 12.6 | 3rd |
| Lanark—Renfrew—Carleton | Don Page | | | | 5,310 | | 3rd |
| Leeds—Grenville | Jan Allen | | | | 6,121 | 13.96 | 3rd |
| Nepean—Carleton | Bea Murray | | | | 11,035 | 14.8 | 3rd |
| Ottawa—Carleton | Vernon Lang | | | | 10,760 | | 3rd |
| Ottawa Centre | Michael Cassidy | Leader of the Ontario New Democratic Party (1978–1982); Member of Provincial Parliament for Ottawa Centre (1971–1984); Member of Ottawa City Council (1970–1972) | Ottawa | Journalist | 17,844 | 34.37 | 1st |
| Ottawa—Vanier | Kathryn Barnard | | | | 9,364 | 21.48 | 3rd |
| Ottawa West | Ross Chapman | | | | 8,304 | | 3rd |
| Prince Edward—Hastings | Donald Wilson | NDP candidate for Prince Edward—Hastings in the 1980 and 1979 federal elections | | | 7,162 | 18.5 | 3rd |
| Renfrew—Nipissing—Pembroke | Gavin Murphy | | | | 4,253 | 9.8 | 3rd |

=== Greater Toronto Area ===
| Riding | Candidate's Name | Notes | Residence | Occupation | Votes | % | Rank |
|---|---|---|---|---|---|---|---|
| Beaches | Neil Young | Member of Parliament for Beaches (1980–1988) | | Machinist | 14,914 | 40.6 | 1st |
| Brampton—Georgetown | John Deamer | | | | 13,356 | | 3rd |
| Broadview–Greenwood | Lynn McDonald | Member of Parliament for Broadview–Greenwood (1982–1988) | | Professor | 15,066 | 45.59 | 1st |
| Burlington | Walter Mulkewich | | | | 11,687 | 19.3 | 2nd |
| Davenport | Manfred Netzel | | | | 5,548 | 22.5 | 2nd |
| Don Valley East | Joe Macdonald | | | | 5,842 | 10.7 | 3rd |
| Don Valley West | Ian Cameron | | | | 6,570 | 13.2 | 3rd |
| Eglinton—Lawrence | Marlene Miller | | | | 6,458 | 14.89 | 3rd |
| Etobicoke Centre | Phil Jones | | | | 7,657 | 12.8 | 3rd |
| Etobicoke—Lakeshore | Patrick Lawlor | Member of Provincial Parliament for Lakeshore (1967–1981) | | Lawyer | 10,549 | 23.7 | 3rd |
| Etobicoke North | David Robertson | | | | 11,136 | 19.8 | 3rd |
| Halton | Kevin Flynn | | | Small business owner | 9,164 | 14.6 | 3rd |
| Mississauga North | Bill Patrick | | | | 13,823 | | 3rd |
| Mississauga South | Norm Jones | | | | 8,584 | 14.7 | 3rd |
| Ontario | Geoff Rison | | | | 12,995 | | 3rd |
| Oshawa | Ed Broadbent | Leader of the New Democratic Party (1975–1989); Member of Parliament for Oshawa (1968–1990) | | | 25,092 | 42.3 | 1st |
| Parkdale—High Park | John Friesen | | | | 8,232 | 20.9 | 3rd |
| Rosedale | Dell Wolfson | | | | 7,836 | 17.82 | 3rd |
| St. Paul's | John Webb | | | | 5,545 | 12.61 | 3rd |
| Scarborough Centre | Michael Prue | | | | 8,240 | 19.3 | 3rd |
| Scarborough East | Alawi Mohideen | | | | 6,422 | | 3rd |
| Scarborough West | David Gracey | | | | 11,436 | 27.5 | 3rd |
| Spadina | Dan Heap | Member of Parliament for Spadina (1981–1988); Member of Toronto City Council (1972–1981) | | Anglican minister | 13,241 | | 1st |
| Trinity | David English | | | | 6,712 | | 2nd |
| Willowdale | John Fagan | | | | 6,711 | 13.0 | 3rd |
| York Centre | Van Newell | | | | 8,037 | 19.8 | 3rd |
| York East | Bill Gorelle | | | | 7,581 | | 3rd |
| York North | Doris Schwar | | | | 10,077 | | 4th |
| York—Peel | John Hall | NDP candidate for York—Peel in the 1980 federal election | | | 9,353 | | 3rd |
| York—Scarborough | Yvonne Bondarchuk | | | | 13,260 | | 3rd |
| York South—Weston | Steve Krashinsky | | | | 11,679 | 31.0 | 2nd |
| York West | Bruno Pasquantonio | | | | 8,718 | 22.0 | 3rd |

=== Hamilton/Niagara ===
| Riding | Candidate's Name | Notes | Residence | Occupation | Votes | % | Rank |
|---|---|---|---|---|---|---|---|
| Erie | Elaine Havlin | | | | 5,868 | | 3rd |
| Hamilton East | David Christopherson | President of United Auto Workers Local 525 | | Union leader | 11,872 | | 2nd |
| Hamilton Mountain | Ian Deans | Member of Parliament for Hamilton Mountain (1980–1986); Member of Provincial Parliament for Wentworth (1967–1979) | | | 25,789 | 49.2 | 1st |
| Hamilton–Wentworth | David Hitchcock | NDP candidate for Hamilton–Wentworth in the 1980 and 1979 federal elections | | | 8,836 | 17.95 | 3rd |
| Hamilton West | Philip Newell | | | | 11,508 | | 3rd |
| Lincoln | John Mayer | | | | 11,888 | | 3rd |
| Niagara Falls | Richard Harrington | | | | 9,863 | 23.8 | 2nd |
| St. Catharines | Gerry Michaud | | | | 16,397 | 30.6 | 2nd |
| Welland | Rob Dobrucki | | | | 10,508 | 24.0 | 3rd |

=== Northern Ontario ===
| Riding | Candidate's Name | Notes | Residence | Occupation | Votes | % | Rank |
|---|---|---|---|---|---|---|---|
| Algoma | Rocco Frangione | | | | 9,499 | 25.75 | 3rd |
| Cochrane—Superior | Ray Brunet | | | | 7,672 | | 3rd |
| Kenora—Rainy River | John Edmund Parry | Mayor of Sioux Lookout (1978–1984); Member of Sioux Lookout Town Council (1977–1978) | Sioux Lookout | Business consultant | 13,319 | | 1st |
| Nickel Belt | John Rodriguez | Member of Parliament for Nickel Belt (1972–1980); Member of Coniston Town Council (1971–1972); President of the Ontario English Catholic Teachers' Association (1968–1969) | | Teacher | 17,141 | 38.60 | 1st |
| Nipissing | Lynne Bennett | | | | 4,735 | | 3rd |
| Parry Sound—Muskoka | Dennis Hay | NDP candidate for Parry Sound—Muskoka in the 1980 and 1979 federal elections | | | 7,113 | 17.9 | 3rd |
| Sault Ste. Marie | Karl Morin-Strom | | | | 10,726 | 31.52 | 2nd |
| Thunder Bay—Atikokan | Iain Angus | Member of Provincial Parliament for Fort William (1975–1977) | | | 14,715 | 41.5 | 1st |
| Thunder Bay—Nipigon | Ernie Epp | | | Professor | 13,901 | 37.2 | 1st |
| Timiskaming | Jim Morrison | | | | 6,685 | | 2nd |
| Timmins—Chapleau | Cid Samson | | | | 9,543 | | 3rd |

=== Southwestern Ontario ===
| Riding | Candidate's Name | Notes | Residence | Occupation | Votes | % | Rank |
|---|---|---|---|---|---|---|---|
| Brant | Derek Blackburn | Member of Parliament for Brant (1971–1993) | | Teacher | 23,103 | 44.20 | 1st |
| Bruce—Grey | Norma Peterson | | | | 5,112 | 12.0 | 3rd |
| Cambridge | Bill McBain | | | | 9,171 | 24.2 | 2nd |
| Elgin | Bob Habkirk | | | | 4,646 | | 3rd |
| Essex—Kent | Peter Toye | | | | 4,234 | | 3rd |
| Essex—Windsor | Steven W. Langdon | NDP candidate for Essex—Windsor in the 1980 and 1979 federal elections | | | 18,746 | 39.3 | 1st |
| Guelph | Jim Robinson | | | | 9,153 | 19.45 | 3rd |
| Haldimand—Norfolk | Bill Jefferies | | | | 6,138 | 13.3 | 3rd |
| Huron—Bruce | Valerie Bolton | | | | 4,075 | 11.0 | 3rd |
| Kent | Derry McKeever | | | | 6,138 | | 3rd |
| Kitchener | Will Ferguson | | | | 13,873 | | 3rd |
| Lambton—Middlesex | Allen Wilford | | | | 4,826 | | 3rd |
| London East | Joe Barth | | | | 10,324 | 26.9 | 2nd |
| London—Middlesex | David N. Cunningham | | | | 9,753 | | 3rd |
| London West | Bruce Lundgren | | | | 10,911 | 16.3 | 3rd |
| Oxford | Wayne Colbran | | | | 6,077 | 13.5 | 3rd |
| Perth | Ian Munro | | | | 5,599 | | 3rd |
| Sarnia—Lambton | Julie Foley | | | | 8,538 | 19.4 | 3rd |
| Waterloo | Bob Needham | NDP candidate for Waterloo in the 1980 federal election | | | 10,275 | 18.15 | 3rd |
| Wellington—Dufferin—Simcoe | Sandy W. A. Young | | | | 6,468 | | 3rd |
| Windsor—Walkerville | Howard McCurdy | Member of Windsor City Council (1980–1984) | | Professor at the University of Windsor | 14,604 | | 1st |
| Windsor West | Paul Forder | | | | 11,503 | 34.23 | 2nd |

== Prince Edward Island ==
| Riding | Candidate's Name | Notes | Residence | Occupation | Votes | % | Rank |
|---|---|---|---|---|---|---|---|
| Cardigan | Lorne Cudmore | | | | 891 | 4.50 | 3rd |
| Egmont | Wain Munro | | | | 994 | 5.64 | 4th |
| Hillsborough | David Burke | | | | 846 | 4.91 | 3rd |
| Malpeque | Janet Norgrove | | | | 2,006 | 10.69 | 3rd |

== Quebec ==
=== Central Quebec ===
| Riding | Candidate's Name | Notes | Residence | Occupation | Votes | % | Rank |
|---|---|---|---|---|---|---|---|
| Berthier—Maskinongé—Lanaudière | Jean Philip Penner | | | | 1,200 | 2.7 | 3rd |
| Champlain | Louise Cloutier | | | | 3,124 | | 3rd |
| Joliette | Martin Vaillancourt | | | | 2,186 | 4.16 | 3rd |
| Richelieu | Gaston Dupuis | | | | 2,174 | 4.48 | 3rd |
| Saint-Maurice | Danielle Delbecque | | | | 1,433 | 3.51 | 3rd |
| Trois-Rivières | John A. Pratt | | | | 1,947 | 4.6 | 3rd |

=== Eastern Townships/Southern Quebec ===
| Riding | Candidate's Name | Notes | Residence | Occupation | Votes | % | Rank |
|---|---|---|---|---|---|---|---|
| Beauce | Serge L'Italien | | | | 1,217 | 2.6 | 3rd |
| Beauharnois—Salaberry | Gus Callaghan | | | | 2,720 | 6.2 | 3rd |
| Brome—Missisquoi | Gordon J. Hamilton | | | | 2,271 | 5.56 | 3rd |
| Châteauguay | Robert Vigneault | | | | 5,083 | | 3rd |
| Drummond | Louis G. Garreau | | | | 2,610 | 6.2 | 3rd |
| Frontenac | Rita Bouchard | | | | 1,081 | | 3rd |
| Lotbinière | Gaston Coté | | | | 1,963 | | 3rd |
| Mégantic—Compton—Stanstead | Jean-Pierre Walsh | | | | 2,690 | | 3rd |
| Richmond—Wolfe | Harriet J. Schleifer | | | | 1,638 | | 3rd |
| Saint-Hyacinthe—Bagot | Claude R. Gagnon | | | | 2,196 | 4.5 | 3rd |
| Saint-Jean | Todd Sloan | | | | 3,642 | 7.1 | 3rd |
| Shefford | Denis Boissé | NDP candidate for Shefford in the 1980 and 1979 federal elections | | | 3,569 | 6.6 | 3rd |
| Sherbrooke | Daniel Berthold | | | | 4,230 | 9.8 | 3rd |
| Verchères | James Christie | | | | 6,534 | 9.5 | 3rd |

=== Greater Montreal ===
| Riding | Candidate's Name | Notes | Residence | Occupation | Votes | % | Rank |
|---|---|---|---|---|---|---|---|
| Blainville—Deux-Montagnes | Normand J. Labrie | NDP candidate for Blainville—Deux-Montagnes in the 1980 and 1979 federal elections | | | 5,609 | | 3rd |
| Bourassa | Roderick Charters | NDP candidate for Bourassa in the 1980 federal election | | | 3,741 | 8.1 | 3rd |
| Chambly | Clifford D. Hastings | | | | 6,783 | 11.15 | 3rd |
| Dollard | Sid Ingerman | | | | 6,619 | 11.65 | 3rd |
| Duvernay | John Shatilla | NDP candidate for Duvernay in the 1980 and 1979 federal elections | | | 5,013 | 8.45 | 3rd |
| Gamelin | Carl Cyr | | | | 4,730 | | 3rd |
| Hochelaga—Maisonneuve | Marie-Ange Gagnon-Sirois | NDP candidate for Hochelaga—Maisonneuve in the 1980 and 1979 federal elections | | | 3,596 | | 3rd |
| Lachine | John J. P. Terauds | | | | 5,628 | | 3rd |
| Lasalle | Pietro Arella | | | | 4,755 | | 3rd |
| Laurier | Jean-Pierre Juneau | NDP candidate for Sainte-Marie in the 1980 and 1979 federal elections | | | 4,595 | | 3rd |
| Laval | John Fasciano | | | | 8,158 | | 3rd |
| Laval-des-Rapides | Léo St-Louis | | | | 5,215 | | 3rd |
| La Prairie | Lyse Chevalier-Grégoire | | | | 8,602 | | 3rd |
| Longueuil | Claire Gagnon | | | | 6,401 | 10.6 | 3rd |
| Montreal–Mercier | Robert Ferland | | | | 4,925 | | 3rd |
| Montreal—Sainte-Marie | Lauraine Vaillancourt | NDP candidate for Laval in the 1980 and 1979 federal elections | | | 3,525 | 11.19 | 3rd |
| Mount Royal | Nancy Pearson | | | | 4,735 | 9.89 | 3rd |
| Notre-Dame-de-Grâce—Lachine East | Grendon Haines | NDP candidate for Notre-Dame-de-Grâce—Lachine East in the 1980 federal election | | | 5,772 | 14.00 | 3rd |
| Outremont | Johanne Beaudin | | | | 6,687 | 18.86 | 3rd |
| Papineau | Paul Comtois | | | | 4,295 | 13.13 | 3rd |
| Rosemont | Roger J.W.D. Lamarre | | | | 4,054 | 10.8 | 3rd |
| Saint-Henri—Westmount | John H. Thompson | | | | 5,889 | | 3rd |
| Saint-Michel—Ahuntsic | Hélène Mongeau | | | | 4,875 | | 3rd |
| Saint-Léonard—Anjou | Terrence Trudeau | | | Physician | 7,506 | | 3rd |
| Terrebonne | Brian Umansky | | | | 6,454 | 8.88 | 3rd |
| Vaudreuil | Anne Erskine | | | | 7,993 | | 3rd |

=== Northern Quebec ===
| Riding | Candidate's Name | Notes | Residence | Occupation | Votes | % | Rank |
|---|---|---|---|---|---|---|---|
| Abitibi | Royal Tremblay | NDP candidate for Abitibi in the 1980 federal election | | | 3,583 | 8.0 | 3rd |
| Charlevoix | Jocelyn Toulouse | | | | 1,022 | | 3rd |
| Chicoutimi | Denise Coté | | | | 2,211 | 6.0 | 3rd |
| Jonquière | Jean Malaison | | | | 1,870 | | 3rd |
| Lac-Saint-Jean | Claude Gagnon | | | | 2,132 | | 3rd |
| Manicouagan | Denis Faubert | | | | 939 | 2.4 | 3rd |
| Roberval | Marius Tremblay | | | | 837 | 2.3 | 3rd |
| Témiscamingue | Guy Verville | | | | 2,189 | 5.40 | 3rd |

=== Quebec City/Gaspe/Eastern Quebec ===
| Riding | Candidate's Name | Notes | Residence | Occupation | Votes | % | Rank |
|---|---|---|---|---|---|---|---|
| Bellechasse | Roger Lemoine | | | | 1,666 | | 3rd |
| Bonaventure—Îles-de-la-Madeleine | Martin Cauvier | | | | 1,040 | | 3rd |
| Charlesbourg | Etienne Tremblay | NDP candidate for Charlesbourg in the 1980 federal election | | | 7,301 | | 3rd |
| Gaspé | Yvon Pipon | NDP candidate for Gaspé in the 1980 federal election | | | 1,065 | | 3rd |
| Kamouraska—Rivière-du-Loup | Victor Bibaud | | | | 1,550 | | 4th |
| Langelier | Majella Desmeules | | | | 4,597 | 11.7 | 3rd |
| Lévis | Jean-Paul Harney | | | | 12,076 | | 3rd |
| Louis-Hébert | Gilles Fiset | | | | 7,548 | 11.79 | 3rd |
| Matapédia—Matane | Frédéric D'Astous | | | | 909 | 3.00 | 4th |
| Montmorency—Orléans | Jacques Bérubé | | | | 3,931 | | 3rd |
| Portneuf | Jacques Pelchat | | | | 3,012 | 6.5 | 3rd |
| Québec-Est | Michel Leblanc | | | | 4,189 | | 3rd |
| Rimouski—Témiscouata | Guy Poulin | | | | 1,250 | | 3rd |

=== Western Quebec/Laurentides/Outaouais ===
| Riding | Candidate's Name | Notes | Residence | Occupation | Votes | % | Rank |
|---|---|---|---|---|---|---|---|
| Argenteuil—Papineau | Bjorn L. Johansson | | | | 2,671 | 7.08 | 3rd |
| Gatineau | Sylvie Rossignol | | | | 6,543 | 12.87 | 3rd |
| Hull—Aylmer | Jacques Audette | | | | 8,247 | 19.62 | 3rd |
| Labelle | Marc Péclet | | | | 4,670 | | 3rd |
| Pontiac—Gatineau—Labelle | Paul Rowland | | | | 2,667 | 7.60 | 3rd |

== Saskatchewan ==
| Riding | Candidate's Name | Notes | Residence | Occupation | Votes | % | Rank |
|---|---|---|---|---|---|---|---|
| Assiniboia | Bill Adamack | | | | 10,853 | | 2nd |
| Humboldt—Lake Centre | Vic Althouse | Member of Parliament for Humboldt—Lake Centre (1980–1988) | | Farmer | 15,087 | | 1st |
| Kindersley—Lloydminster | Roy Atkinson | | | | 10,229 | | 2nd |
| Mackenzie | Mel McCorriston | | | | 10,848 | | 2nd |
| Moose Jaw | Glenn Kindrachuk | | | | 13,338 | | 2nd |
| Prince Albert | Stan Hovdebo | Member of Parliament for Prince Albert (1979–1988) | | | 13,359 | 35.6 | 1st |
| Qu'Appelle—Moose Mountain | Bill Sauter | | | | 8,414 | | 2nd |
| Regina East | Simon De Jong | Member of Parliament for Regina East (1979–1988) | | | 20,474 | | 1st |
| Regina West | Les Benjamin | Member of Parliament for Regina West (1979–1988); Member of Parliament for Regina—Lake Centre (1968–1979) | | | 23,865 | | 1st |
| Saskatoon East | Colin Clay | | | | 16,670 | | 2nd |
| Saskatoon West | Ron Fisher | | | | 18,910 | | 2nd |
| Swift Current—Maple Creek | Don Beveridge | | | | 8,196 | | 2nd |
| The Battlefords—Meadow Lake | Doug Anguish | Member of Parliament for The Battlefords—Meadow Lake (1980–1984) | | | 12,559 | | 2nd |
| Yorkton—Melville | Lorne Nystrom | Member of Parliament for Yorkton—Melville (1968–1993) | | | 18,116 | 51.3 | 1st |

== The Territories ==
| Riding | Candidate's Name | Notes | Residence | Occupation | Votes | % | Rank |
|---|---|---|---|---|---|---|---|
| Nunatsiaq | Rhoda Innuksuk | | | | 1,973 | 28.65 | 3rd |
| Western Arctic | Bertha Allen | | | | 3,538 | 28.03 | 2nd |
| Yukon | Sibyl Frei | | | | 1,884 | 16.10 | 3rd |
