= New Democratic Party candidates in the 1979 Canadian federal election =

This is a list of New Democratic Party candidates in the 1979 Canadian federal election. The NDP nominated candidates in all of Canada's 282 ridings; 26 of whom were elected. Following the election, the NDP remained the third-largest party in the House of Commons.

== Alberta ==
=== Calgary ===
| Riding | Candidate's Name | Notes | Residence | Occupation | Votes | % | Rank |
|---|---|---|---|---|---|---|---|
| Calgary Centre | Bohdan Harasymiw | | | | 4,095 | 10.94 | 3rd |
| Calgary East | Barry Pashak | ANDP candidate for Calgary-North Hill in the 1971 Alberta provincial election | | Professor at Mount Royal University | 5,172 | 11.12 | 3rd |
| Calgary North | Norm Herman | | | | 4,227 | | 3rd |
| Calgary South | Cathie McCreary | | | | 3,584 | | 3rd |
| Calgary West | Jack Peters | | | | 3,694 | 8.48 | 3rd |

=== Edmonton ===
| Riding | Candidate's Name | Notes | Residence | Occupation | Votes | % | Rank |
|---|---|---|---|---|---|---|---|
| Edmonton East | Lynn Fogwill | | | | 5,154 | 15.45 | 3rd |
| Edmonton North | John Miller | | | | 5,673 | | 3rd |
| Edmonton South | Gordon Fearn | | | | 5,401 | | 3rd |
| Edmonton—Strathcona | Robert Davidson | | | | 5,352 | 12.04 | 3rd |
| Edmonton West | Ken Nixon | | | | 4,624 | | 3rd |

=== Rural Alberta ===
| Riding | Candidate's Name | Notes | Residence | Occupation | Votes | % | Rank |
|---|---|---|---|---|---|---|---|
| Athabasca | Robert Godbout | | | | 2,770 | 10.17 | 3rd |
| Bow River | Gale Burke | | | | 2,200 | 5.34 | 4th |
| Crowfoot | Roger Milbrandt | | | | 1,529 | 4.68 | 3rd |
| Lethbridge–Foothills | Roger Rickwood | | | | 3,720 | 8.94 | 3rd |
| Medicine Hat | Lorne L. Burk | | | | 3,053 | 7.63 | 3rd |
| Peace River | Earle Joseph Guertin | | | | 5,801 | 17.65 | 3rd |
| Pembina | Norman Flach | | | | 4,953 | | 3rd |
| Red Deer | John Younie | | | | 2,856 | 6.4 | 3rd |
| Vegreville | James Kenney | | | | 3,191 | | 3rd |
| Wetaskiwin | Alfred O. Arnston | | | | 3,587 | 9.9 | 3rd |
| Yellowhead | Bob Ritchie | | | | 3,600 | 8.7 | 3rd |

== British Columbia ==
=== British Columbia Interior ===
| Riding | Candidate's Name | Notes | Residence | Occupation | Votes | % | Rank |
|---|---|---|---|---|---|---|---|
| Cariboo—Chilcotin | Harry Olaussen | | | | 8,273 | 27.69 | 2nd |
| Kamloops—Shuswap | Ron H. Anderson | | | | 12,193 | 27.53 | 3rd |
| Kootenay East—Revelstoke | Sid Parker | Mayor of Revelstoke (1970–1978) | | Train conductor | 11,107 | 35.07 | 2nd |
| Kootenay West | Lyle Kristiansen | | | | 11,503 | 39.83 | 2nd |
| Okanagan North | John Powell | | | | 11,951 | 23.16 | 3rd |
| Okanagan—Similkameen | Darwin Sigurgeirson | | | | 11,715 | 27.63 | 2nd |
| Prince George—Bulkley Valley | Archie Patrick | | | | 8,521 | 27.30 | 2nd |
| Prince George—Peace River | Bob Simpson | | | | 5,478 | 20.50 | 2nd |
| Skeena | Jim Fulton | | | Probation officer | 10,996 | 41.82 | 1st |

=== Fraser Valley/Lower Mainland ===
| Riding | Candidate's Name | Notes | Residence | Occupation | Votes | % | Rank |
|---|---|---|---|---|---|---|---|
| Burnaby | Svend Robinson | | | Lawyer | 20,604 | 39.76 | 1st |
| Capilano | Michael Karton | | | | 6,639 | 14.56 | 3rd |
| Fraser Valley East | Harry W. Fontaine | | | | 9,126 | 21.38 | 2nd |
| Fraser Valley West | Cyril Barkved | | | | 15,322 | 30.89 | 2nd |
| Mission—Port Moody | Mark Rose | Member of Parliament for Fraser Valley West (1968–1974); Member of Coquitlam City Council (1966–1968) | | Professor | 20,847 | 43.83 | 1st |
| New Westminster—Coquitlam | Pauline Jewett | Member of Parliament for Northumberland (1963–1965) | | President of Simon Fraser University (1974–1978) | 19,301 | 44.43 | 1st |
| North Vancouver—Burnaby | Russ Hicks | | | | 12,084 | 27.89 | 3rd |
| Richmond—South Delta | Mercia Stickney | | | | 13,524 | 24.15 | 2nd |
| Surrey—White Rock—North Delta | Carol Langford | | | | 17,992 | | 2nd |
| Vancouver Centre | Ron Johnson | | | | 13,350 | 29.97 | 3rd |
| Vancouver East | Margaret Anne Mitchell | | | Social worker | 13,697 | 42.71 | 1st |
| Vancouver Kingsway | Ian Waddell | | | Lawyer | 15,928 | 44.76 | 1st |
| Vancouver Quadra | Alan Bush | | | | 10,665 | 24.46 | 3rd |
| Vancouver South | Judy McManus | | | | 8,806 | 20.91 | 3rd |

=== Vancouver Island ===
| Riding | Candidate's Name | Notes | Residence | Occupation | Votes | % | Rank |
|---|---|---|---|---|---|---|---|
| Comox—Powell River | Raymond Skelly | | | Teacher | 22,075 | 44.28 | 1st |
| Cowichan—Malahat—The Islands | Jim Manly | BC NDP candidate for Prince Rupert in the 1969 British Columbia provincial election | | | 17,471 | 39.98 | 2nd |
| Esquimalt—Saanich | Bob Cameron | | | | 15,862 | 29.03 | 2nd |
| Nanaimo—Alberni | Ted Miller | | | Teacher | 21,304 | 43.98 | 1st |
| Victoria | Gretchen Brewin | | | | 15,344 | 29.93 | 2nd |

== Manitoba ==
=== Rural Manitoba ===
| Riding | Candidate's Name | Notes | Residence | Occupation | Votes | % | Rank |
|---|---|---|---|---|---|---|---|
| Brandon-Souris | David Serle | | | | 8,949 | 24.67 | 2nd |
| Churchill | Rod Murphy | | | Teacher | 12,544 | 51.7 | 1st |
| Dauphin—Swan River | Laverne Lewycky | | | | 11,770 | 41.6 | 2nd |
| Lisgar | Keith W.D. Poulson | | | | 2,920 | | 3rd |
| Portage—Marquette | Maude Lelonde | | | | 6,612 | | 2nd |
| Provencher | Richard C. Greenway | | | | 8,473 | 25.7 | 2nd |
| Selkirk—Interlake | Terry Sargeant | | | Policy analyst | 14,225 | 42.7 | 1st |

=== Winnipeg ===
| Riding | Candidate's Name | Notes | Residence | Occupation | Votes | % | Rank |
|---|---|---|---|---|---|---|---|
| Saint Boniface | Grant Wichenko | | | | 11,455 | 23.7 | 3rd |
| Winnipeg—Assiniboine | Robert Johannson | | | | 7,067 | | 3rd |
| Winnipeg—Birds Hill | Bill Blaikie | | | United Church minister | 25,492 | 50.16 | 1st |
| Winnipeg—Fort Garry | Vivian Rachlis | | | | 8,176 | 17.87 | 3rd |
| Winnipeg North | David Orlikow | Member of Parliament for Winnipeg—Birds Hill (1962–1988); Member of the Legislative Assembly of Manitoba for St. Johns (1958–1962); Member of Winnipeg City Council (1951–1958) | | | 22,417 | 52.7 | 1st |
| Winnipeg North Centre | Stanley Knowles | Member of Parliament for Winnipeg North Centre (1962–1984 & 1942–1958); Vice President of the Canadian Labour Congress (1958–1962); Member of the Winnipeg City Council (1941–1942) | | United Church minister | 15,121 | | 1st |
| Winnipeg—St. James | J. Frank Syms | | | | 11,747 | | 2nd |

== New Brunswick ==
| Riding | Candidate's Name | Notes | Residence | Occupation | Votes | % | Rank |
|---|---|---|---|---|---|---|---|
| Carleton—Charlotte | Ed Gaunce | | | | 3,971 | 13.3 | 3rd |
| Fundy—Royal | Bruce E. Halpin | | | | 7,746 | 19.14 | 3rd |
| Gloucester | Kevin O'Connell | | | | 3,366 | 9.45 | 3rd |
| Madawaska—Victoria | James Aucoin | | | | 1,620 | 6.3 | 3rd |
| Moncton | Gregory Murphy | | | | 8,936 | 18.49 | 3rd |
| Northumberland—Miramichi | Jerry Dunnett | | | | 4,653 | 17.23 | 3rd |
| Restigouche | Gail Walsh | | | | 4,718 | 17.8 | 3rd |
| Saint John | Eldon Richardson | | | | 6,358 | 18.9 | 3rd |
| Westmorland—Kent | René Vannieuwenhuizen | | | | 4,609 | 14.92 | 3rd |
| York—Sunbury | Phillip Booker | | | | 5,665 | 14.36 | 3rd |

== Newfoundland and Labrador ==
| Riding | Candidate's Name | Notes | Residence | Occupation | Votes | % | Rank |
|---|---|---|---|---|---|---|---|
| Bonavista-Trinity-Conception | W.A. Bill Parsons | | | | 7,448 | 30.15 | 2nd |
| Burin-St. George's | Ross Senior | | | | 3,943 | | 2nd |
| Gander—Twillingate | Wallace Bown | | | | 4,460 | | 3rd |
| Grand Falls—White Bay—Labrador | Bryan Blackmore | | | | 12,538 | 42.37 | 2nd |
| Humber—Port au Port—St. Barbe | Fonse Faour | Member of Parliament for Humber—St. George's—St. Barbe (1978–1979) | | Lawyer | 15,872 | | 1st |
| St. John's East | Stratford G. Canning | | | | 6,684 | 19.27 | 3rd |
| St. John's West | Tom Mayo | | | | 9,033 | | 3rd |

== Nova Scotia ==
| Riding | Candidate's Name | Notes | Residence | Occupation | Votes | % | Rank |
|---|---|---|---|---|---|---|---|
| Annapolis Valley—Hants | Bob Levy | | | | 8,008 | 19.96 | 3rd |
| Cape Breton—East Richmond | Andrew Hogan | Member of Parliament for Cape Breton—East Richmond (1974–1980) | | Roman Catholic priest | 15,269 | | 1st |
| Cape Breton Highlands—Canso | William J. Woodfine | | | | 4,657 | | 3rd |
| Cape Breton—The Sydneys | Ed Murphy | | | | 10,310 | | 3rd |
| Central Nova | Gary A. Chambers | | | | 4,521 | 13.53 | 3rd |
| Cumberland—Colchester | Hayden Trenholm | | | | 5,662 | 13.83 | 3rd |
| Dartmouth—Halifax East | Frederick Turley | | | | 7,116 | 16.17 | 3rd |
| Halifax | Alexa McDonough | | | Social worker | 7,590 | 18.53 | 3rd |
| Halifax West | Dennis Theman | | | | 8,265 | 17.18 | 3rd |
| South Shore | John Yates | | | | 3,988 | 10.92 | 3rd |
| South West Nova | Ian MacPherson | | | | 4,217 | 11.36 | 3rd |

== Ontario ==
=== Central Ontario ===
| Riding | Candidate's Name | Notes | Residence | Occupation | Votes | % | Rank |
|---|---|---|---|---|---|---|---|
| Durham—Northumberland | Fred McLaughlin | | | | 8,393 | 20.45 | 3rd |
| Grey—Simcoe | Bill Proud | | | | 5,576 | | 3rd |
| Northumberland | Hugh Jenney | | | | 5,150 | | 3rd |
| Peterborough | Cyril Carter | | | | 8,451 | 16.9 | 3rd |
| Simcoe North | Fayne Bullen | | | | 11,284 | 27.0 | 2nd |
| Simcoe South | Gaye Lamb | | | | 8,307 | | 3rd |
| Victoria–Haliburton | Patrick Daniel | | | | 6,872 | 15.1 | 3rd |

=== Eastern Ontario/Ottawa ===
| Riding | Candidate's Name | Notes | Residence | Occupation | Votes | % | Rank |
|---|---|---|---|---|---|---|---|
| Glengarry—Prescott—Russell | Paul De Broeck | | | | 4,164 | 10.0 | 3rd |
| Hastings—Frontenac | Kevin Arseneault | | | | 5,691 | | 3rd |
| Kingston and the Islands | Stephen Foster | | | | 8,472 | 19.0 | 3rd |
| Lanark—Renfrew—Carleton | Gord Gilhuly | | | | 5,749 | | 3rd |
| Leeds—Grenville | Mildred Smith | | | | 6,551 | 15.42 | 3rd |
| Nepean—Carleton | Marnie Girvan | | | | 7,810 | 12.7 | 3rd |
| Ottawa—Carleton | Jill Vickers | | | Professor at Carleton University | 8,234 | | 3rd |
| Ottawa Centre | John Smart | | | | 10,213 | 20.69 | 3rd |
| Ottawa—Vanier | Paul H. Michaud | | | | 7,023 | 15.85 | 3rd |
| Ottawa West | Abby Pollonetsky | | | | 7,051 | | 3rd |
| Prince Edward—Hastings | Donald Wilson | | | | 5,833 | 14.7 | 3rd |
| Renfrew—Nipissing—Pembroke | Don Breault | | | | 7,133 | 17.3 | 3rd |

=== Greater Toronto Area ===
| Riding | Candidate's Name | Notes | Residence | Occupation | Votes | % | Rank |
|---|---|---|---|---|---|---|---|
| Beaches | Neil Young | Candidate for Ward 9 (The Beaches) in the 1976 Toronto municipal election | | Machinist | 12,322 | 33.1 | 2nd |
| Brampton—Georgetown | David Moulton | | | | 11,584 | | 3rd |
| Broadview–Greenwood | Bob Rae | | | | 13,187 | 39.72 | 1st |
| Burlington | Danny Dunleavy | | | | 8,421 | 14.7 | 2nd |
| Davenport | Ed Brown | | | | 5,579 | 24.4 | 2nd |
| Don Valley East | Saul Paton | | | | 6,595 | 12.3 | 3rd |
| Don Valley West | Jean Smith | | | | 5,572 | 10.6 | 3rd |
| Eglinton—Lawrence | Leo Heaps | | | | 7,368 | 16.40 | 3rd |
| Etobicoke Centre | Dan Shipley | | | | 6,237 | 10.2 | 3rd |
| Etobicoke—Lakeshore | Terry Meagher | | | | 14,044 | 30.9 | 3rd |
| Etobicoke North | Adrian Dorn | | | | 12,017 | 23.2 | 3rd |
| Halton | Doug Black | | | | 7,838 | 14.5 | 3rd |
| Mississauga North | John McGuigan | | | | 11,002 | | 3rd |
| Mississauga South | Colin Baynes | | | | 8,869 | 16.2 | 3rd |
| Ontario | Geoff Rison | | | | 11,510 | | 3rd |
| Oshawa | Ed Broadbent | Leader of the New Democratic Party (1975–1989); Member of Parliament for Oshawa (1968–1990) | | | 29,090 | 51.3 | 1st |
| Parkdale—High Park | Doug Little | | | | 9,539 | 23.5 | 3rd |
| Rosedale | Ron B. Thomson | | | | 6,902 | 17.54 | 3rd |
| St. Paul's | James Lockyer | | | Lawyer | 5,779 | 13.30 | 3rd |
| Scarborough Centre | Tom Lyons | | | | 9,533 | 22.2 | 3rd |
| Scarborough East | Sid Dunkley | | | | 8,190 | | 3rd |
| Scarborough West | John Paul Harney | Member of Parliament for Scarborough West (1972–1974) | | Professor at York University | 13,437 | 31.2 | 3rd |
| Spadina | John Foster | | | | 8,765 | | 2nd |
| Trinity | Manuel Azevedo | | | | 5,504 | | 2nd |
| Willowdale | Chris Thurrott | | | | 7,128 | 14.3 | 3rd |
| York Centre | Vince Del Buono | | | | 10,464 | 25.7 | 2nd |
| York East | Kay MacPherson | NDP candidate for York East in the 1974 federal election | | | 8,651 | | 3rd |
| York North | Bruce Searle | | | | 7,591 | | 3rd |
| York—Peel | Wally Gustar | | | | 7,725 | | 3rd |
| York—Scarborough | Frank Lowery | | | | 10,978 | | 3rd |
| York South—Weston | Vito Cautillo | | | | 10,451 | 28.2 | 2nd |
| York West | Elio Costa | | | | 9,712 | 24.8 | 3rd |

=== Hamilton/Niagara ===
| Riding | Candidate's Name | Notes | Residence | Occupation | Votes | % | Rank |
|---|---|---|---|---|---|---|---|
| Erie | Clarence Gibson | | | | 6,985 | | 3rd |
| Hamilton East | Don Gray | Member of Hamilton City Council (1972–1985) | | | 11,783 | | 2nd |
| Hamilton Mountain | Andy Asselin | | | | 12,273 | 24.0 | 3rd |
| Hamilton–Wentworth | David Hitchcock | | | | 8,550 | 20.20 | 3rd |
| Hamilton West | Miriam Simpson | | | | 8,512 | | 3rd |
| Lincoln | Kenneth I. Lee | | | | 13,400 | | 3rd |
| Niagara Falls | John A. Dawson | | | | 7,757 | 19.2 | 3rd |
| St. Catharines | Peter Elliott | | | | 11,897 | 23.5 | 3rd |
| Welland | Robert Wright | | | | 11,151 | 25.9 | 3rd |

=== Northern Ontario ===
| Riding | Candidate's Name | Notes | Residence | Occupation | Votes | % | Rank |
|---|---|---|---|---|---|---|---|
| Algoma | Jim Dinner | | | | 10,989 | 32.40 | 2nd |
| Cochrane North | Robert Fortin | | | | 11,080 | | 2nd |
| Kenora—Rainy River | John Edmund Parry | Mayor of Sioux Lookout (1978–1984); Member of Sioux Lookout Town Council (1977–1978) | Sioux Lookout | Business consultant | 10,844 | | 2nd |
| Nickel Belt | John Rodriguez | Member of Parliament for Nickel Belt (1972–1980); Member of Coniston Town Council (1971–1972); President of the Ontario English Catholic Teachers' Association (1968–1969) | | Teacher | 17,772 | 43.37 | 1st |
| Nipissing | Patricia Hughes | | | | 5,681 | | 3rd |
| Parry Sound—Muskoka | Dennis Hay | | | | 6,270 | 17.1 | 3rd |
| Sault Ste. Marie | Cyril Symes | Member of Parliament for Sault Ste. Marie (1972–1980) | | Teacher | 12,089 | 37.26 | 1st |
| Thunder Bay—Atikokan | Iain Angus | Member of Provincial Parliament for Fort William (1975–1977) | | | 11,667 | 34.1 | 2nd |
| Thunder Bay—Nipigon | Bruce McKay | | | | 11,288 | 32.3 | 2nd |
| Timiskaming | Arnold Peters | Member of Parliament for Timiskaming (1957–1980) | | Miner | 11,595 | | 1st |
| Timmins—Chapleau | Dennis Welin | | | | 10,160 | | 2nd |

=== Southwestern Ontario ===
| Riding | Candidate's Name | Notes | Residence | Occupation | Votes | % | Rank |
|---|---|---|---|---|---|---|---|
| Brant | Derek Blackburn | Member of Parliament for Brant (1971–1993) | | Teacher | 20,908 | 42.2 | 1st |
| Bruce—Grey | John Giese | | | | 4,723 | 11.7 | 3rd |
| Cambridge | Marc Sommerville | | | | 11,085 | 29.5 | 2nd |
| Elgin | Mary Lou Weitzel | | | | 4,293 | | 3rd |
| Essex—Kent | Ralph Wensley | | | | 4,759 | | 3rd |
| Essex—Windsor | Steven W. Langdon | | | | 18,603 | 40.4 | 2nd |
| Guelph | Jim Finamore | | | | 8,535 | 19.73 | 3rd |
| Haldimand—Norfolk | Joe Clark | | | | 6,762 | 14.8 | 3rd |
| Huron—Bruce | Moira Couper | | | | 2,729 | 7.7 | 3rd |
| Kent | Marie-France Wilkinson | | | | 5,047 | | 3rd |
| Kitchener | James Herman | | | | 11,345 | | 3rd |
| Lambton—Middlesex | Grant Reynolds | | | | 4,585 | | 3rd |
| London East | Rob Martin | | | | 8,531 | 22.2 | 3rd |
| London—Middlesex | Bill Lloyd | | | | 8,855 | 23.8 | 3rd |
| London West | Paddy Musson | | | | 9,378 | 15.7 | 3rd |
| Oxford | Marjorie Lanaway | | | | 5,980 | 14.0 | 3rd |
| Perth | John Davies | | | | 4,255 | | 3rd |
| Sarnia—Lambton | Wally Krawczyk | | | | 10,148 | 25.4 | 3rd |
| Waterloo | Mike Makarchuk | | | | 9,375 | 18.12 | 3rd |
| Wellington—Dufferin—Simcoe | Jeff Koechlin | | | | 4,744 | | 3rd |
| Windsor—Walkerville | David Burr | | | | 15,744 | | 2nd |
| Windsor West | Maxine Jones | | | | 11,906 | 34.12 | 2nd |

== Prince Edward Island ==
| Riding | Candidate's Name | Notes | Residence | Occupation | Votes | % | Rank |
|---|---|---|---|---|---|---|---|
| Cardigan | George MacFarlane | | | | 892 | 5.22 | 3rd |
| Egmont | Vincent Gallant | | | | 710 | 4.49 | 3rd |
| Hillsborough | Bob Crockett | | | | 1,453 | 9.58 | 3rd |
| Malpeque | Charlie Sark | | | | 1,126 | 6.80 | 3rd |

== Quebec ==
=== Central Quebec ===
| Riding | Candidate's Name | Notes | Residence | Occupation | Votes | % | Rank |
|---|---|---|---|---|---|---|---|
| Berthier—Maskinongé—Lanaudière | Richard Leclercq | | | | 841 | 2.2 | 4th |
| Champlain | Denis Tousignant | | | | 1,328 | | 5th |
| Joliette | Jacques Trudeau | | | | 1,324 | 2.80 | 3rd |
| Richelieu | Madeleine Martel | | | | 1,500 | 3.32 | 4th |
| Saint-Maurice | Robert Deschamps | | | | 952 | 2.48 | 4th |
| Trois-Rivières | Roland Auger | | | | 1,682 | 4.4 | 4th |

=== Eastern Townships/Southern Quebec ===
| Riding | Candidate's Name | Notes | Residence | Occupation | Votes | % | Rank |
|---|---|---|---|---|---|---|---|
| Beauce | Raymond Philippe Roy | | | | 215 | 0.5 | 5th |
| Beauharnois—Salaberry | Gilles Gagne | | | | 1,866 | 4.6 | 4th |
| Brome—Missisquoi | Gertrude Lefebvre-Brown | | | | 991 | 2.62 | 4th |
| Châteauguay | Ginette Bourdon | | | | 2,404 | | 4th |
| Drummond | Patricia Lamarre | | | | 639 | 1.6 | 5th |
| Frontenac | Martin Vaillancourt | | | | 492 | | 4th |
| Lotbinière | Jean-Denis Lavigne | | | | 1,159 | | 4th |
| Mégantic—Compton—Stanstead | Murray Dale Powell | | | | 1,316 | | 4th |
| Richmond | Lisa Bourgeois | | | | 551 | | 4th |
| Saint-Hyacinthe—Bagot | Richard Sylvestre | | | | 802 | 1.8 | 4th |
| Saint-Jean | Todd Sloan | | | | 2,204 | 5.0 | 4th |
| Shefford | Denis Boisse | | | | 1,008 | 2.05 | 5th |
| Sherbrooke | Roger Muller | | | | 1,180 | 2.8 | 4th |
| Verchères | Micheline Ruelland | | | | 3,652 | 6.3 | 4th |

=== Greater Montreal ===
| Riding | Candidate's Name | Notes | Residence | Occupation | Votes | % | Rank |
|---|---|---|---|---|---|---|---|
| Blainville—Deux-Montagnes | Normand J. Labrie | | | | 3,472 | | 4th |
| Bourassa | Daniel Piotrowski | | | | 1,804 | 3.8 | 5th |
| Chambly | Dominique Vaillancourt | | | | 3,324 | 6.43 | 4th |
| Dollard | Pierre Bourgeois | | | | 3,949 | | 3rd |
| Duvernay | John Shatilla | | | | 2,839 | 5.48 | 4th |
| Gamelin | Danielle Dubois | | | | 2,753 | | 4th |
| Hochelaga—Maisonneuve | Marie-Ange Gagnon-Sirois | | | | 1,746 | | 5th |
| Lachine | Buff Norman | | | | 2,450 | | 3rd |
| Lasalle | Gaston Coté | | | | 3,249 | | 3rd |
| Laurier | Jean-Pierre Bourdouxhe | | | | 1,934 | | 5th |
| Laval | Lauraine Vaillancourt | | | | 3,521 | | 4th |
| Laval-des-Rapides | Pierre Ivan Laroche | | | | 3,702 | | 4th |
| Laprairie | Jean-Claude Bohrer | | | | 4,188 | | 4th |
| Longueuil | Jean-Pierre Vaillancourt | | | | 3,995 | 7.2 | 4th |
| Montreal–Mercier | Elizabeth Chase-Chapdelaine | | | | 1,816 | | 4th |
| Mount Royal | David C. Winch | | | | 2,023 | 4.0 | 3rd |
| Notre-Dame-de-Grâce | Gus Callaghan | | | | 3,683 | 8.08 | 3rd |
| Outremont | Claire A. Brisson | | | | 4,112 | 10.33 | 2nd |
| Papineau | Jean A. Richard | | | | 1,913 | 5.55 | 4th |
| Rosemont | Marcel Julien | | | | 2,238 | 5.25 | 4th |
| Saint-Henri—Westmount | Claude de Mestral | | | | 3,297 | | 3rd |
| Saint-Michel—Ahuntsic | Filippo Salvatore | | | | 2,616 | | 3rd |
| Saint-Léonard—Anjou | Colette Lalancette-Deschamps | | | | 3,105 | | 4th |
| Sainte-Marie | Jean-Pierre Juneau | | | | 1,575 | 4.77 | 4th |
| Terrebonne | Roland Francis | | | | 3,114 | 5.6 | 4th |
| Vaudreuil | Lorne Brown | | | | 4,512 | | 3rd |

=== Northern Quebec ===
| Riding | Candidate's Name | Notes | Residence | Occupation | Votes | % | Rank |
|---|---|---|---|---|---|---|---|
| Abitibi | Maurice Vaney | | | | 1,420 | 3.0 | 5th |
| Charlevoix | Normand Laforce | | | | 613 | | 4th |
| Chicoutimi | Marc St-Hilaire | | | | 1,435 | 4.3 | 4th |
| Jonquière | Jacques Hubert | | | | 2,724 | | 3rd |
| Lac-Saint-Jean | Jean-Denis Bérubé | | | | 1,589 | | 4th |
| Manicouagan | Carole Noel | | | | 2,105 | 6.7 | 4th |
| Roberval | Jacques Ouellet | | | | 385 | 1.1 | 5th |
| Témiscamingue | Germain Boudreau | | | | 1,473 | 3.77 | 4th |

=== Western Quebec/Laurentides/Outaouais ===
| Riding | Candidate's Name | Notes | Residence | Occupation | Votes | % | Rank |
|---|---|---|---|---|---|---|---|
| Argenteuil | Thérèse Gardner Pelletier | | | | 1,576 | 4.60 | 4th |
| Gatineau | André Beaudry | | | | 3,292 | 6.91 | 3rd |
| Hull | Michel Légère | | | Lawyer | 7,175 | 16.56 | 2nd |
| Labelle | Willie Kofman | | | | 2,134 | | 4th |
| Pontiac—Gatineau—Labelle | Ida Brown | | | | 1,682 | 5.30 | 4th |

== Saskatchewan ==
| Riding | Candidate's Name | Notes | Residence | Occupation | Votes | % | Rank |
|---|---|---|---|---|---|---|---|
| Assiniboia | Bill Knight | Member of Parliament for Assiniboia (1971–1974) | | Teacher | 11,183 | | 2nd |
| Humboldt—Lake Centre | Vic Althouse | | | Farmer | 12,681 | | 2nd |
| Kindersley—Lloydminster | Alf Gleave | | | | 10,254 | | 2nd |
| Mackenzie | Dale R. Schmeichel | | | | 10,370 | | 2nd |
| Moose Jaw | David H. Henley | | | | 11,122 | | 2nd |
| Prince Albert | Stan Hovdebo | | | Teacher | 11,979 | 35.7 | 2nd |
| Qu'Appelle—Moose Mountain | George A. Hubbard | | | | 7,008 | | 2nd |
| Regina East | Simon De Jong | | | Artist/Restaurant owner | 15,022 | | 1st |
| Regina West | Les Benjamin | Member of Parliament for Regina West (1979–1988); Member of Parliament for Regina—Lake Centre (1968–1979) | | | 19,340 | | 1st |
| Saskatoon East | Bob Ogle | | | Roman Catholic priest | 15,234 | | 1st |
| Saskatoon West | Reg Parker | | | | 15,094 | | 2nd |
| Swift Current—Maple Creek | Ron Gates | | | | 8,720 | | 2nd |
| The Battlefords—Meadow Lake | Eli Nesdoly | | | | 10,327 | | 2nd |
| Yorkton—Melville | Lorne Nystrom | Member of Parliament for Yorkton—Melville (1968–1993) | | Consultant/Teacher | 16,677 | 47.5 | 1st |

== The Territories ==
| Riding | Candidate's Name | Notes | Residence | Occupation | Votes | % | Rank |
|---|---|---|---|---|---|---|---|
| Nunatsiaq | Peter Ittinuar | | | | 1,963 | 37.74 | 1st |
| Western Arctic | Georges Erasmus | | | | 3,385 | 29.33 | 3rd |
| Yukon | Joe Jack | | | | 2,578 | 23.06 | 3rd |
