= Regina North =

Former provincial electoral district in Saskatchewan, Canada

Saskatchewan electoral district

Defunct provincial electoral district
- Legislature: Legislative Assembly of Saskatchewan
- District created: 1964
- District abolished: 1967
- First contested: 1964
- Last contested: 1986

Regina North was a provincial electoral district for the Legislative Assembly of Saskatchewan, Canada. This district consisted of the northern third of the city of Regina in its original incarnation.

The riding existed for just the 1964 Saskatchewan general election. It was created out of part of the four-seat Regina City riding. It was abolished into the ridings of Regina North West, Regina Centre, and Regina North East.

The riding also existed from 1982 to 1991.

== Election results ==
1964 Saskatchewan general election
Party	Candidate	Votes	%
Co-operative Commonwealth	Edward Charles Whelan	4,722	54.55
Liberal	Ron Atchison	3,867	44.67
Communist	Norman Brudy	68	0.79
Total valid votes/Turnout		8,657	78.90
Eligible voters		10,972	
Source: Canadian Elections Database

=== Regina North (1982–1991) ===
1986 Saskatchewan general election: Regina North
Party	Candidate	Votes	%	±%
NDP	Kim Trew	6,008	58.72	+20.81
Prog. Conservative	Ken Skilnick	3,109	30.38	-29.27
Liberal	Tom Townsend	1,098	10.73	+8.29
Alliance	Ian Bruce Clarke	17	0.17	*
Total		10,232	100.00	

1982 Saskatchewan general election: Regina North
Party	Candidate	Votes	%	±%
Prog. Conservative	Jack Klein	5,845	59.65	*
NDP	Stan Oxelgren	3,715	37.91	*
Liberal	Daryl Boychuk	239	2.44	*
Total		9,799	100.00	

== See also ==
- List of Saskatchewan provincial electoral districts
- List of Saskatchewan general elections
- Canadian provincial electoral districts
