= Edward Charles Whelan =

Canadian politician

Edward Charles Whelan (August 6, 1919 – December 11, 2007) was a political figure in Saskatchewan, Canada. He represented Regina City from 1960 to 1964, Regina North from 1964 to 1967 and Regina North West from 1967 to 1979 in the Legislative Assembly of Saskatchewan as firstly a Co-operative Commonwealth Federation party member and then as a New Democratic Party member.

He was born in Amherstburg, Ontario, the son of Charles Bernard Whelan and Frances Kelly, and was educated in local schools and at the Toronto Technical School. Whelan took over the operation of the family farm following the death of his father. Later, he worked as a machinist in automobile plants in Windsor. Whelan moved to Saskatchewan in 1943 and took up farming there. In 1948, he married Pemrose Henry. Whelan served in the provincial cabinet as Minister of Mineral Resources and as Minister of Consumer Affairs.

With his wife, he published a book on the life of Tommy Douglas, Touched by Tommy.

His brother Eugene served in the House of Commons, and became a Cabinet minister and Senator.

== Electoral record ==
=== Regina City (4 members) ===
1960 Saskatchewan general election
Party	Candidate	Votes	%	±%
Co-operative Commonwealth	Charles Cromwell Williams	23,425		
Co-operative Commonwealth	Allan Emrys Blakeney	22,382		
Co-operative Commonwealth	Marjorie Alexandra Cooper	22,205		
Co-operative Commonwealth	Edward Charles Whelan	21,806		
Liberal	Frederick William Johnson	16,662		
Liberal	Leslie Charles Sherman	16,316		
Liberal	James Gillis Collins	15,578		
Liberal	Mavis Jeanne Adams	14,589		
Progressive Conservative	John Leishman	7,944		
Social Credit	Henry Austin Hunt	7,652		
Social Credit	Bert Louis Iannone	7,206		
Progressive Conservative	Murdoch Alexander MacPherson	7,194		
Social Credit	G. Lindsay Bower	7,103		
Social Credit	William G. Gamlin	7,058		
Progressive Conservative	Donald Bowman	6,358		
Progressive Conservative	Walter Schmidt	5,175		
Independent	Leslie Hibbs	698		
Independent	Herbert Kenneth Cooper	624		
Communist	William Charles Beeching	315		

=== Regina North ===
1964 Saskatchewan general election
Party	Candidate	Votes	%	±%
Co-operative Commonwealth	Edward Charles Whelan	4,722	54.54	
Liberal	Ron Atchison	3,867	44.67	
Communist	Norman Brudy	68	0.79	
Total valid votes		8,657	100.0	

=== Regina North West ===
1967 Saskatchewan general election
Party	Candidate	Votes	%	±%
New Democratic	Edward Charles Whelan	5,364	52.33	
Liberal	Frank Kleefeld	3,728	36.37	
Progressive Conservative	George Tkach	1,011	9.86	
Social Credit	H. Kenneth Cooper	147	1.44	
Total valid votes		10,250	100.0	

1971 Saskatchewan general election
Party	Candidate	Votes	%	±%
New Democratic	Edward Charles Whelan	8,805	64.27	+11.94
Liberal	David H. Sheard	4,848	35.39	-0.98
Communist	Fred J. Schofield	48	0.34	
Total valid votes		13,699	100.0	

1975 Saskatchewan general election
Party	Candidate	Votes	%	±%
New Democratic	Edward Charles Whelan	3,174	42.13	-22.14
Liberal	David Bouchard	2,333	30.97	-4.42
Progressive Conservative	Bill Sveinson	2,027	26.90	
Total valid votes		7,534	100.0	

1978 Saskatchewan general election
Party	Candidate	Votes	%	±%
New Democratic	Edward Charles Whelan	5,575	54.87	+12.74
Progressive Conservative	Philip Lundeen	3,142	30.93	+4.03
Liberal	J. Culliton Poston	1,443	14.20	-16.77
Total valid votes		10,160	100.0	
