= Emmett McCusker =

Canadian politician

Emmet McCusker

Member of Parliament for Regina City
- In office June 1949 – August 1953
- Preceded by: John Oliver Probe
- Succeeded by: Claude Ellis

Personal details
- Born: Emmet Andrew McCusker; 9 February 1889 Alfred, Ontario, Canada
- Died: 20 January 1973 (aged 83)
- Party: Liberal
- Profession: Physician

Emmet Andrew McCusker (9 February 1889 – 20 January 1973) was a Liberal party member of the House of Commons of Canada. He was born in Alfred, Ontario and became a physician by career after studying at Regina Collegiate Institute and McGill University where he received his medical degrees (MDCM, FIAM).

He was first elected to Parliament at the Regina City riding in the 1949 general election. After serving one term, he was defeated by Claude Ellis of the Co-operative Commonwealth Federation in the 1953 election. McCusker was also unsuccessful in the 1957 election where he attempted to unseat Ellis.
