= Ken More =

Canadian politician

- Official 1966 portrait

Member of Parliament for Regina City
- In office March 1958 – April 1968

Personal details
- Born: 25 May 1907 Qu'Appelle, Saskatchewan
- Died: 24 October 1993 (aged 86)
- Party: Progressive Conservative
- Profession: businessman, clothier, manager, secretary-treasurer

Kenneth Hamill More (25 May 1907 – 24 October 1993) was a Progressive Conservative party member of the House of Commons of Canada. He was born in Qu'Appelle, Saskatchewan and became a businessman, clothier, manager and secretary-treasurer by career.

He was first elected at the Regina City riding in the 1958 general election after making an unsuccessful bid for the seat in 1957. More was re-elected there in 1962 defeating former Premier Tommy Douglas, the first leader of the New Democratic Party. He was again re-elected in 1963 and 1965. After riding boundary changes in the late 1960s, More's House of Commons career was ended with his defeat at the Regina—Lake Centre riding in the 1968 election to Les Benjamin of the New Democratic Party.

In 1985, More was appointed to the Saskatchewan Sports Hall of Fame for his leadership and support of sports in Saskatchewan during his life. He was president of the Saskatchewan Amateur Hockey Association prior to entering federal politics.
