= John Probe =

Canadian politician

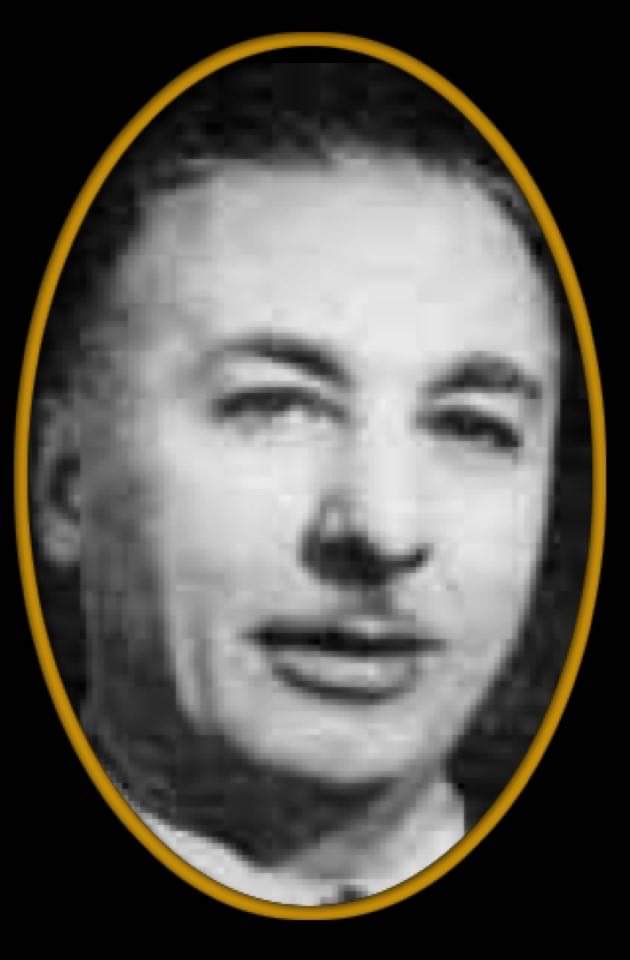

Member of Parliament for Regina City
- In office June 1945 – June 1949
- Preceded by: Donald Alexander McNiven
- Succeeded by: Emmett McCusker

Personal details
- Born: John Oliver Probe; 24 December 1900 Weyburn, Saskatchewan, Canada
- Died: 29 September 1964 (aged 63) Regina, Saskatchewan, Canada
- Party: Co-operative Commonwealth Federation
- Spouse(s): Georgina A. Breeze m. 23 December 1900
- Profession: teacher

John Oliver Probe (24 December 1900 – 29 September 1964) was a Co-operative Commonwealth Federation member of the House of Commons of Canada.

== Biography ==
He was born in Weyburn, Saskatchewan, and became a teacher by career.

Probe served in the military for World War II at various postings. He attended the University of Saskatchewan and received a Bachelor of Arts, Collegiate Certificate in Education, Math Specialist.

He was first elected to Parliament at the Regina City riding in the 1945 general election after an unsuccessful attempt in 1940. Probe was defeated in the 1949 election by Emmett McCusker of the Liberal Party.
