= George Richardson (Canadian politician) =

Canadian politician

George Clough Richardson

Member of Parliament for Humboldt—Lake Centre
- In office May 22, 1979 – February 18, 1980
- Preceded by: riding established
- Succeeded by: Vic Althouse

Personal details
- Born: December 5, 1916 Glen Afton, Saskatchewan, Canada
- Died: June 26, 2000 (aged 83) Saskatoon, Saskatchewan, Canada
- Party: Progressive Conservative
- Education: University of Saskatchewan (BSA1948)
- Profession: Farmer

George Clough Richardson (December 5, 1916 – June 26, 2000) was a Progressive Conservative party member of the House of Commons of Canada. He was a farmer by trade.

He represented Saskatchewan's Humboldt—Lake Centre electoral district which he won in the 1979 federal election. After serving his only term, the 31st Canadian Parliament, he was defeated in the 1980 federal election by Vic Althouse of the New Democratic Party.

Richardson made two previous unsuccessful attempts to enter Parliament in the 1972 and 1974 federal elections at Regina—Lake Centre electoral district. He died in Saskatoon in 2000.
