= Steve Mazurak =

Profile
- Position: Wide receiver

Personal information
- Born: May 25, 1951 (age 75)
- Listed height: 6 ft 2 in (1.88 m)
- Listed weight: 195 lb (88 kg)

Career history
- 1973–1980: Saskatchewan Roughriders

Steve Mazurak (born May 25, 1951) is a retired Canadian football player who played for the Saskatchewan Roughriders of the Canadian Football League (CFL). He played Junior Baseball for the Regina Maroons playing in two Canadian Championships (1971 and 1972). He also played Junior Football for the Regina Rams and played in two Canadian Championships (1971-1972) winning in 1971. He went on to play for the Saskatchewan Roughriders from 1973-1980. Following his career with the Roughriders he was hired by his former teammate George Reed, President of the Canadian Football League Players Association as the first ever full time Executive Director of the Players Association. He assisted in negotiating two collective bargaining agreements for the CFLPA and was instrumental in establishing the first ever Career Counseling Program for its members. Following his five year career with the CFLPA he spent 2 years working with the SaskSport/Lotteries ‘Sask First’ Canada Games High Performance Program as Director Communications.

He was the Liberal candidate for Regina West at the 1984 Canadian federal election, coming in third behind incumbent Les Benjamin.

He left SaskSport in 1989 to lead the Saskatchewan Rogers Cantel business development team in the new world of wireless cellular communications. As a sales leader DSM (Saskatchewan) and later Director Sales and interim Vice President Cantel MidWest (Winnipeg) he finished his wireless career as Owner Operator of Ci Wireless for AT&T Allstream. In 2005 he left his Winnipeg business and moved back to his Regina roots to work for his Roughriders and incoming President and CEO Jim Hopson.

In 2018, Steve retired after a thirteen year career as a senior executive with the Riders. Steve and his friend Jim Hopson enjoyed many successes with the Roughriders. Steve and his wife Heather were married in 1973 and reside in Regina.
