= Regina North West =

Saskatchewan electoral district

Defunct provincial electoral district
- Legislature: Legislative Assembly of Saskatchewan
- District created: 1967
- First contested: 1967
- Last contested: 1994

Demographics
- Census division(s): Division 6
- Census subdivision(s): Regina

Regina North West was a provincial electoral district for the Legislative Assembly of Saskatchewan, Canada. It was located in Regina.

The riding was created prior to the 1967 election out of parts of Regina North and Regina West. It was abolished prior to the 1995 election into Regina Qu'Appelle Valley and Regina Sherwood.

== Members of the Legislative Assembly ==
Legislature	Years	Member	Party
Regina North West
16th	1967–1971	Ed Whelan	New Democrat
17th	1971–1975	Ed Whelan	New Democrat
18th	1975–1978	Ed Whelan	New Democrat
19th	1978	Ed Whelan	New Democrat
19th	1979–1982	John Solomon	New Democrat
20th	1982–1983	Bill Sveinson	Progressive Conservative
20th	1983–1985	Bill Sveinson	Liberal
20th	1986	Bill Sveinson	Western Canada Concept
21st	1986–1991	John Solomon	New Democrat
22nd	1991–1993	John Solomon	New Democrat
22nd	1994–1995	Anita Bergman	Liberal

== Election results ==
February 4, 1994 By-election: Regina North West
Party	Candidate	Votes	%	±%
Liberal	Anita Bergman	2,566	57.05	+28.40
NDP	Kathie Maher-Wolbaum	1,794	39.88	-20.85
Prog. Conservative	Harvey Schmidt	138	3.07	-7.55
Total		4,498	100.00	

1991 Saskatchewan general election
Party	Candidate	Votes	%	±%
NDP	John Solomon	5,660	60.73	+2.46
Liberal	Liz Calvert	2,670	28.65	+20.23
Prog. Conservative	Jack Mock	990	10.62	-22.40
Total		9,320	100.00	
Source: Elections Saskatchewan

1986 Saskatchewan general election
Party	Candidate	Votes	%	±%
NDP	John Solomon	7,970	58.27	+19.97
Prog. Conservative	Alvin Law	4,517	33.02	-24.71
Liberal	John MacGowan	1,152	8.42	+6.34
Alliance	Bill Sveinson	39	0.29	*
Total valid votes		13,678	99.80	
Total rejected ballots		27	0.20	-0.06
Turnout		13,705	87.01	-0.32
Eligible voters		15,751		
New Democratic gain from Progressive Conservative		Swing		+22.34
Source: Elections Saskatchewan

1982 Saskatchewan general election
Party	Candidate	Votes	%	±%
Prog. Conservative	Bill Sveinson	6,797	57.73	+36.95
NDP	John Solomon	4,509	38.30	-9.44
Liberal	Adrian McBride	245	2.08	-29.39
Western Canada Concept	Les R. Kavanagh	222	1.89	*
Total valid votes		11,773	99.75	
Total rejected ballots		30	0.25	-0.02
Turnout		11,803	87.33	+8.81
Eligible voters		13,515		
Progressive Conservative gain from New Democratic		Swing		+23.20
Source: Elections Saskatchewan

October 17, 1979 By-election: Regina North West
Party	Candidate	Votes	%	±%
NDP	John Solomon	3,354	47.73	-7.13
Liberal	Ted Malone	2,211	31.47	+17.27
Prog. Conservative	Philip Lundeen	1,460	20.78	-10.14
Total valid votes		7,025		
New Democratic hold		Swing		-12.20

1978 Saskatchewan general election
Party	Candidate	Votes	%	±%
NDP	Ed Whelan	5,575	54.87	+12.74
Prog. Conservative	Philip Lundeen	3,142	30.93	+4.02
Liberal	J. Culliton Poston	1,443	14.20	-16.76
Total valid votes		10,160	99.73	
Total rejected ballots		28	0.27	-0.07
Turnout		10,188	78.52	+1.89
Eligible voters		12,975		
New Democratic hold		Swing		+4.36
Source: Elections Saskatchewan

1975 Saskatchewan general election
Party	Candidate	Votes	%	±%
NDP	Ed Whelan	3,174	42.13	-22.15
Liberal	David Bouchard	2,333	30.97	-4.42
Prog. Conservative	Bill Sveinson	2,027	26.90	-
Total valid votes		7,534	99.66	
Total rejected ballots		26	0.34	
Turnout		7,560	76.63	
Eligible voters		9,865		
New Democratic hold		Swing		-8.86
Source: Elections Saskatchewan

1971 Saskatchewan general election
Party	Candidate	Votes	%	±%
NDP	Ed Whelan	8,805	64.27	+11.94
Liberal	David H. Sheard	4,848	35.39	-0.98
Communist	Fred J. Schofield	46	0.34	*
Total valid votes		13,699		
New Democratic hold		Swing		+6.46

1967 Saskatchewan general election
Party	Candidate	Votes	%
NDP	Ed Whelan	5,364	52.33
Liberal	Frank Kleefeld	3,728	36.37
Prog. Conservative	George Tkach	1,011	9.86
Social Credit	H. Kenneth Cooper	147	1.43
Total valid votes		10,250	
