= John Solomon (Canadian politician) =

Canadian politician

Member of the Legislative Assembly of Saskatchewan
- In office 1979–1982
- Preceded by: Charles Whelan
- Succeeded by: Bill Sveinson
- Constituency: Regina North West
- In office 1986–1993
- Preceded by: Bill Sveinson
- Succeeded by: Anita Bergman
- Constituency: Regina North West

Member of Parliament
- In office 1993–1997
- Preceded by: Les Benjamin
- Succeeded by: riding dissolved
- Constituency: Regina—Lumsden
- In office 1997–2000
- Preceded by: first member
- Succeeded by: Larry Spencer
- Constituency: Regina—Lumsden—Lake Centre

Personal details
- Born: May 23, 1950 (age 75) Dauphin, Manitoba, Canada
- Party: Saskatchewan New Democratic Party; New Democratic Party of Canada

John Lewis Solomon (born May 23, 1950) is a Canadian public servant and former politician. From 2001 until 2008, he was chair of Saskatchewan's Workers' Compensation Board. He was previously a provincial and federal politician.

== Biography ==
Born in Dauphin, Manitoba, Solomon is a former small business operator, and holds degrees in political studies and economics from the University of Manitoba. He also worked for the Canadian National Railway in Winnipeg for three years. He came to Saskatchewan in 1973 and married Janice Lee Bench the following year.

Solomon served as Provincial Secretary for the Saskatchewan New Democratic Party, as executive assistant in the Allan Blakeney government and a corporate planner with SaskTel prior to his election in 1979.

He was a Saskatchewan New Democratic Party (NDP) Member of the Legislative Assembly (MLA) in the Legislative Assembly of Saskatchewan for three terms for the riding of Regina North West, and was elected to the House of Commons of Canada in the 1993 federal election. Solomon served as whip for the NDP in the House of Commons from 1996 to 2000. In an election in which the NDP's caucus fell from 43 seats to 9, Solomon was the only rookie MP elected for the federal NDP. He served as MP for Regina—Lumsden and then Regina—Lumsden—Lake Centre until he was defeated by a narrow margin in the 2000 federal election.

Solomon served as fulltime chair of the Saskatchewan Saskatchewan Workers' Compensation Board from 2001 to 2008 and has served as a board director for Tiberius Gold Corp and Conexus Credit Union after earning his professional Chartered Director's designation from the DeGroote School of Business at McMaster University.
