= 1976 Progressive Conservative leadership election =

1976 Progressive Conservative Party leadership election
- February 22, 1976

2,360 delegates in the 1st ballot 1,181 delegate votes needed to win
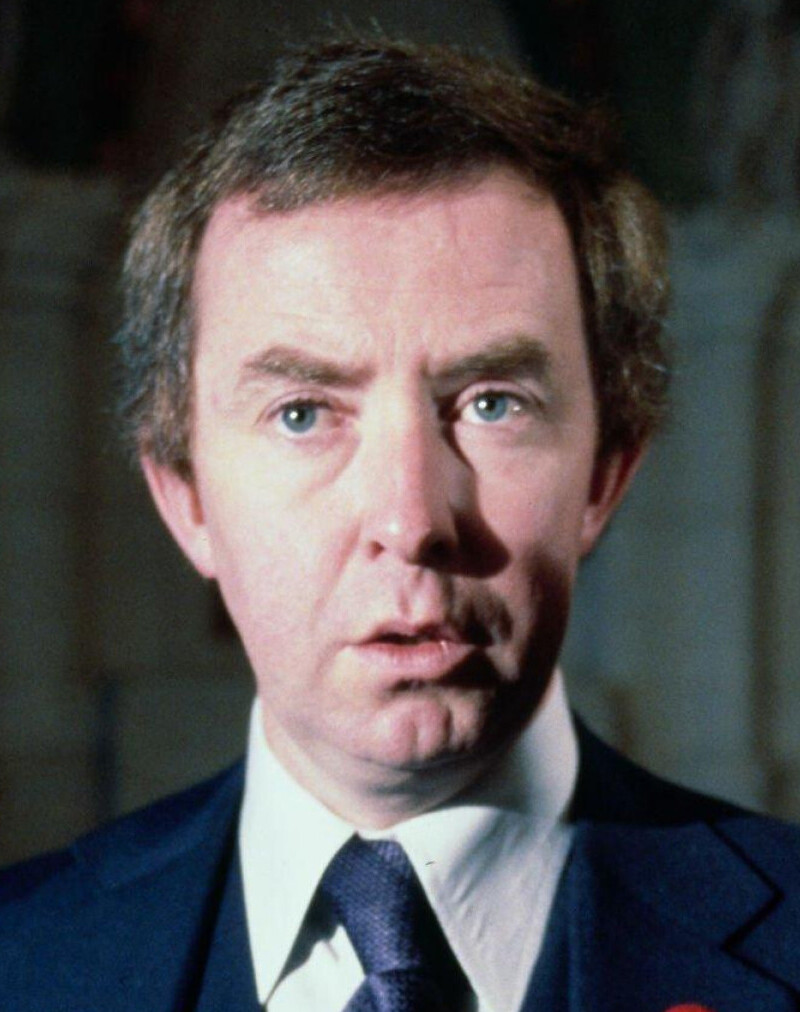

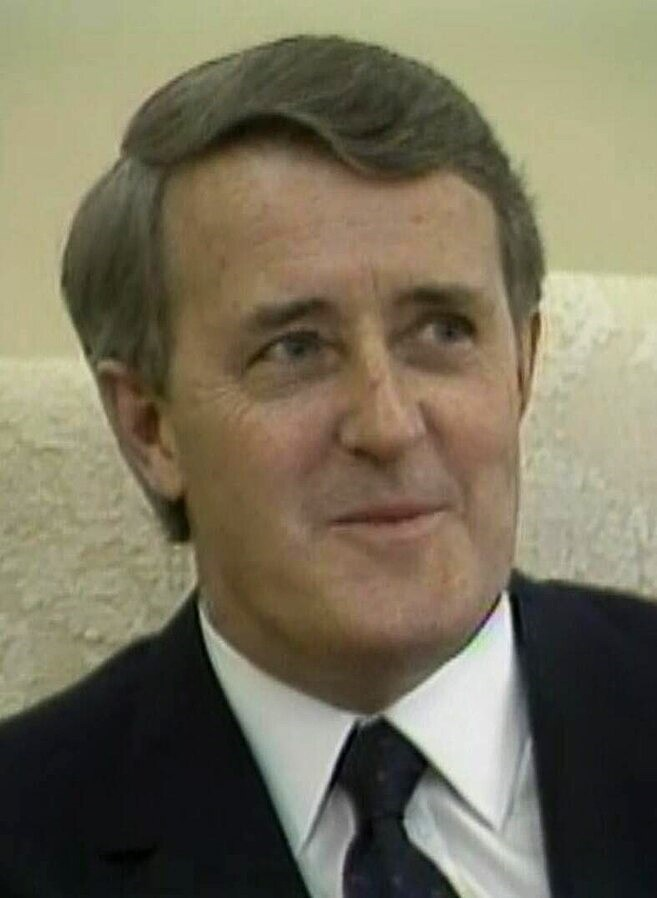
		CW
Candidate	Joe Clark	Claude Wagner	Brian Mulroney
Fourth ballot delegate count	1,187 (51.4%)	1,122 (48.6%)	Eliminated
Third ballot delegate count	969 (41.4%)	1,003 (42.8%)	369 (15.8%)
Second ballot delegate count	532 (22.8%)	667 (28.5%)	419 (17.9%)
First ballot delegate count	277 (11.7%)	531 (22.5%)	357 (15.1%)
Leader before election
Robert Stanfield
Elected Leader
Joe Clark

1976 Progressive Conservative leadership election
- Date: February 22, 1976
- Convention: Ottawa Civic Centre, Ottawa, Ontario
- Resigning leader: Robert Stanfield
- Won by: Joe Clark
- Ballots: 4
- Candidates: 11
- Spending limit: None

The 1976 Progressive Conservative leadership election was held at the Ottawa Civic Centre in Ottawa on February 22, 1976, to elect a leader of the Progressive Conservative Party of Canada to replace Robert Stanfield, who had resigned after losing the 1968, 1972, and 1974 elections. It unexpectedly elected Joe Clark, a 36-year-old, little-known PC Member of Parliament from Alberta as the party's new leader. Clark defeated Claude Wagner on the fourth ballot of the convention by a margin of 65 votes.

The convention's delegates were elected by the party's riding associations, along with the party's youth, campus and women's associations. There were also numerous ex officio delegates, including PC Members of Parliament, defeated candidates from the previous election, members of provincial legislatures, members of the party's national executive and the executives of provincial parties affiliated to the federal party. Delegates cast secret ballots, so their votes were not "tied" to any candidate. After each ballot, the candidate winning the fewest votes was removed from the ballot for the next round. Several candidates withdrew voluntarily when it became clear that they would not be able to win.

== Candidates ==
- Claude Wagner, 50, was the front-runner going into the convention. A former Liberal Minister of Justice in the government of Quebec, Wagner's support came from party members who believed that having a Quebec francophone leader would enable the party to expand its support in Quebec, where the party was usually soundly defeated by the Liberal Party of Canada in elections. Wagner's law-and-order image as Quebec justice minister appealed to many on the party's right-wing.
- Brian Mulroney, 36, was a lawyer from Quebec who had grown up in a bilingual family and was also seen as a candidate who could appeal to Quebec. Mulroney had never run for public office before, however, and alienated many party members with his slick appearance and his very expensive campaign. Key operatives in Mulroney's campaign included Ontario PC president Alan Eagleson and Newfoundland Premier Frank Moores. Mulroney was endorsed by only two sitting Members of Parliament, Heath MacQuarrie (Hillsborough) and James McGrath (St. John's East).
- Joe Clark, 36, had been the Member of Parliament for Rocky Mountain, Alberta since the 1972 federal election. A Red Tory, in his youth he had served two terms as president of the Progressive Conservative Youth wing. Prior to being elected to parliament, Clark was a journalist, political science teacher, and party worker.
- Jack Horner, 48, had been a Member of Parliament from Alberta since 1958 and was a cattle rancher. He was considered to be a maverick and attracted votes from right-wing westerners. Horner was endorsed by former Prime Minister John Diefenbaker.
- Paul Hellyer, 52, was a popular, long-term Liberal cabinet minister from Toronto who had been defeated by Pierre Trudeau at the 1968 Liberal leadership convention. After leaving the Liberal Party, Hellyer had attempted to establish a new party under his own leadership, the Action Canada movement. This was unsuccessful, and Hellyer joined the PC Party. Hellyer seriously damaged his bid for the PC leadership during his convention speech, when he criticized centrist Red Tories in the party for not being conservative enough. This alienated many party members who saw the irony in a former Liberal cabinet minister lecturing party members about being conservative.
- Flora MacDonald, 49, a popular PC Member of Parliament from Kingston, Ontario, was the first woman to make a serious run for the PC leadership. (Mary Walker-Sawka had won two votes at the 1967 leadership convention.) MacDonald encouraged women of all political stripes across Canada to support her campaign by contributing one dollar. She was believed to be the front-runner amongst the Red Tory candidates going into the convention. Based on the public statements of support that she had received from delegates, many believed that she had a realistic chance of becoming leader. She had been endorsed by New Brunswick Premier Richard Hatfield.
- Sinclair Stevens, 49, an Ontario businessperson and PC MP for York—Simcoe since 1972.
- Pat Nowlan, 44, the Member of Parliament for Annapolis Valley, Nova Scotia, had sat in parliament since 1965.
- Heward Grafftey, 47, was the MP for Brome—Missisquoi, Quebec.
- James McPhail Gillies, 51, was the MP for Don Valley in Toronto, Ontario.
- John Fraser, 44, was the MP for Vancouver South, British Columbia.

Richard Quittenton, president of St. Clair College in Windsor, had also been a candidate but withdrew before the first ballot and endorsed Wagner.

== Results ==
The first ballot was widely expected to be a close contest between Wagner and MacDonald, though it was thought unlikely that either of them would have a decisive lead. The result proved a shock to everyone at the convention, as while Wagner did about as well as had been expected, MacDonald did far worse than even the most pessimistic predictions had indicated, coming in sixth place; the phenomenon of delegates promising their votes to one candidate and then voting for another has become known in Canadian politics as the "Flora Syndrome". Mulroney was slightly ahead of the rest of the chasing pack, but still over seven percentage points behind Wagner, who was now the clear front-runner. Grafftey was automatically eliminated after finishing in last place, with Gillies and Stevens dropping out of their own accord; all three endorsed Clark.

While Wagner extended his delegate count on the second ballot, Clark saw the most dramatic improvement in his delegate count, nearly doubling it from the first round. Mulroney dropped down to third place and made only minimal gains. MacDonald, having remained on the second ballot in the hope that she might pick up some Red Tory delegates from the candidates who dropped out, likewise earned only a small number of extra delegates; realizing that the situation was hopeless and that she would most likely be eliminated next if she remained on the ballot, she withdrew and threw her support behind Clark, as did Fraser, who was automatically eliminated in this round. Nowlan withdrew and initially intended to endorse Horner, but the latter, sensing that the momentum was with Clark, persuaded Nowlan that they should both endorse Wagner to prevent a split in the right-wing vote. Hellyer followed their lead and also endorsed Wagner.

The third round had Wagner continuing to lead, but only barely, with both he and Clark having picked up large numbers of delegates since the previous round, albeit Clark having done slightly better in that regard. Conversely, any momentum that Mulroney had completely stalled, causing him to actually lose delegates and be automatically eliminated. While it was now clear that Mulroney was in a position to be the kingmaker, he simply left the convention after his elimination was announced and did not endorse either Wagner or Clark; this created an unpredictable scenario, as about half of Mulroney's delegates were favourable to Wagner because he was a fellow Quebecer, while the remaining half were favourable to Clark due to his political positions being closer to Mulroney's.

Ultimately, Mulroney's delegates were sufficiently favourable to Clark to afford him a narrow victory on the final ballot. Clark's majority over Wagner was just 2.8%, making this the most closely contested election for the leadership of a major Canadian political party until that point, surpassed in the years since only by Andrew Scheer's victory over Maxime Bernier (with a majority of 1.9%) in the 2017 Conservative Party of Canada leadership election.

Delegate support by ballot
Candidate	1st ballot		2nd ballot		3rd ballot		4th ballot	
Candidate	Votes cast	%	Votes cast	%	Votes cast	%	Votes cast	%
CLARK, Charles Joseph (Joe)	277	11.7%	532	22.8%	969	41.4%	1,187	51.4%
WAGNER, Claude	531	22.5%	667	28.5%	1,003	42.8%	1,122	48.6%
MULRONEY, Martin Brian	357	15.1%	419	17.9%	369	15.8%	Eliminated; Did not endorse	
HORNER, John Henry (Jack)	235	10.0%	286	12.2%	Endorsed Wagner			
HELLYER, Paul Theodore	231	9.8%	118	5.1%	Endorsed Wagner			
MACDONALD, Flora Isabel	214	9.1%	239	10.2%	Endorsed Clark			
FRASER, John Allen	127	5.4%	34	1.5%	Endorsed Clark			
NOWLAN, John Patrick (Pat)	86	3.6%	42	1.8%	Endorsed Wagner			
STEVENS, Sinclair McKnight	182	7.7%	Endorsed Clark					
GILLIES, James McPhail	87	3.7%	Endorsed Clark					
GRAFFTEY, William Heward	33	1.4%	Endorsed Clark					
Total	2,360	100.0%	2,337	100.0%	2,341	100.0%	2,309	100.0%

First round
Wagner	22.50%
Mulroney	15.13%
Clark	11.74%
Horner	9.96%
Hellyer	9.79%
MacDonald	9.07%
Stevens	7.71%
Fraser	5.38%
Gillies	3.69%
Nowlan	3.64%
Grafftey	1.40%

Second round
Wagner	28.54%
Clark	22.76%
Mulroney	17.93%
Horner	12.24%
MacDonald	10.23%
Hellyer	5.05%
Nowlan	1.80%
Fraser	1.45%

Third round
Wagner	42.84%
Clark	41.39%
Mulroney	15.76%

Fourth round
Clark	51.41%
Wagner	48.59%

== See also ==
- Progressive Conservative leadership elections
