= Milton Neil Campbell =

Canadian politician

Member of the Canadian Parliament for Mackenzie
- In office 1921–1933
- Preceded by: John Flaws Reid
- Succeeded by: John Angus MacMillan

Personal details
- Born: January 21, 1881 Greenvale, Prince Edward Island, Canada
- Died: November 11, 1965 (aged 84) London, Ontario, Canada
- Party: Progressive Party of Canada

Milton Neil Campbell (January 21, 1881 – November 11, 1965) was a Canadian politician. He represented the Saskatchewan electoral district of Mackenzie from 1921 to 1933, in the House of Commons of Canada. He resigned from the House of Commons in 1933 to accept an appointment as vice-chairman of the Tariff Board of Canada, a position that he held until 1943.

He was a member of the Progressive Party of Canada and joined the Ginger Group of radical MPs.
