= Regina—Lumsden =

Former federal electoral district in Saskatchewan, Canada

Regina—Lumsden was a federal electoral district in the province of Saskatchewan, Canada, that was represented in the House of Commons of Canada from 1988 to 1997. This riding was created in 1987 from parts of Moose Jaw and Regina West ridings. Regina—Lumsden consisted of the western portion of the province of Saskatchewan.

The electoral district was abolished in 1996 when it was re-distributed between Palliser, Qu'Appelle and Regina—Arm River ridings.

== Members of Parliament ==
This riding elected the following members of Parliament:

Parliament	Years	Member	Party
Regina—Lumsden; Riding established from Moose Jaw and Regina West
34th	1988–1993	Les Benjamin	New Democratic
35th	1993–1997	John Solomon	New Democratic
Riding dissolved into Palliser, Regina—Arm River and Qu'Appelle

== Electoral history ==
1988 Canadian federal election
Party	Candidate	Votes
New Democratic	Les Benjamin	21,593
Progressive Conservative	Sam Richardson	9,934
Liberal	Don McGregor	5,840
No affiliation	Brian Rands	139

1993 Canadian federal election
Party	Candidate	Votes
New Democratic	John SOLOMON	12,323
Liberal	Anita BERGMAN	11,327
Reform	Jerry BOYCHUK	7,322
Progressive Conservative	Beattie MARTIN	2,494
National	Nancy PENKALA	748
Canada Party	Frederick B. KING	76

== See also ==
- List of Canadian electoral districts
- Historical federal electoral districts of Canada
