= John Flaws Reid =

Canadian politician

Member of the Canadian Parliament for Mackenzie
- In office 1917–1921
- Preceded by: Edward L. Cash
- Succeeded by: Milton Neil Campbell

Personal details
- Born: June 30, 1860 Eday, Orkney Islands, Scotland
- Died: July 10, 1943 (aged 83) Yorkton, Saskatchewan, Canada
- Party: Unionist

John Flaws Reid (June 30, 1860 – July 10, 1943) was a Scottish-born farmer and political figure in Saskatchewan, Canada. He represented Mackenzie in the House of Commons of Canada and was first elected in the Conscription Crisis election of 1917 as a Liberal-Unionist supporting the Union Government of Sir Robert Borden. He did not run for re-election in 1921.

He was born in Eday, Orkney Islands, the son of Robert Reid and Charlotte Stevenson. In 1882, he left Scotland and came to York Colony, Northwest Territories (later Yorkton, Saskatchewan), choosing a site nearby to settle. He worked in Portage la Prairie so that he could purchase supplies and returned to his homestead the following year, when his mother and brothers arrived from Scotland. He served in the militia during the North-West Rebellion of 1885. The following year, Reid married Ida Estella Rae Rendall Fergus. He served as a member of the local school board for over thirty years. In 1899, he was named road inspector for Yorkton district. He also served on the municipal council for Orcadia.
