= Alexander Malcolm Nicholson =

Canadian politician

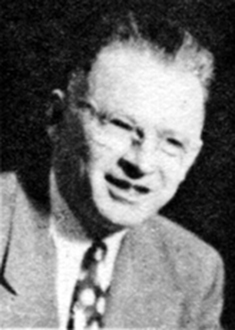

Alexander Malcolm "Sandy" Nicholson (November 25, 1900 – October 12, 1991) was a Canadian clergyman, farmer and politician.

He was born in Lucknow, Ontario, the son of Alexander Nicholson and Isabelle MacDonald, and was educated in Lucknow and at the University of Saskatchewan. In 1928, Nicholson married Marian Leila Massey.

Nicholson served as a United Church of Canada minister at Hudson Bay Junction, Saskatchewan and had a farm in Sturgis, Saskatchewan. He became an organizer for the Co-operative Commonwealth Federation in 1935, became the national treasurer of the party in 1942 and from 1944 to 1950 and served as a CCF Member of Parliament from 1940 to 1949 and again from 1953 until his defeat in 1958. He then served as a CCF-NDP member of the Saskatchewan legislature in the 1960s. From 1960 until 1964 he was the province's Minister of Social Welfare and Rehabilitation. He continued as a Member of the Legislative Assembly (MLA) until his defeat in the 1967 provincial election.

== Archives ==
There are Alexander Malcolm Nicholson fonds at Library and Archives Canada (Archival reference number R4793), the Archives of Ontario and United Church of Canada Archives.

Parliament of Canada
Preceded by John Angus MacMillan	Member of Parliament for Mackenzie; 1940–1949	Succeeded by Gladstone Ferrie
Preceded by Gladstone Ferrie	Member of Parliament for Mackenzie; 1953–1958	Succeeded by Stanley Korchinski
Legislative Assembly of Saskatchewan
Preceded by John H. Sturdy	Member of the Legislative Assembly for Saskatoon City; 1960–1967; Served alongside: Arthur T. Stone and Gladys Strum (1960–1964); John Edward Brockelbank, Wesley A. Robbins, Sally Merchant, and Harry D. Link (1964–1967)	Riding abolished
