= Stanley Korchinski =

Canadian politician

Member of Parliament for Mackenzie
- In office 1958–1984
- Preceded by: Sandy Nicholson
- Succeeded by: Jack Scowen

Personal details
- Born: 29 January 1929 Rama, Saskatchewan, Canada
- Died: 13 May 2000 (aged 71)
- Party: Progressive Conservative
- Profession: farmer

Stanley James Korchinski (29 January 1929 – 13 May 2000) was a Progressive Conservative party member of the House of Commons of Canada. He was born in Rama, Saskatchewan and became a farmer by career.

Korchinski represented Saskatchewan's Mackenzie electoral district from 1958 until 1984, serving nine consecutive terms in the 24th through 32nd Canadian Parliaments. He was initially unsuccessful in the 1957 election, losing to both the Co-operative Commonwealth Federation and Liberal party candidates of the Mackenzie riding. He won the seat at Mackenzie in 1958 and won re-election in 1962, 1963, 1965, 1968, 1972, 1974, 1979 and 1980.
