= Bob Kaplan =

Canadian politician and lawyer

The Honourable Bob Kaplan PC, QC

Member of the Canadian Parliament for Don Valley
- In office June 25, 1968 – October 29, 1972
- Preceded by: Riding created
- Succeeded by: James Gillies

Member of the Canadian Parliament for York Centre
- In office July 8, 1974 – October 24, 1993
- Preceded by: James Edgar Walker
- Succeeded by: Art Eggleton

Personal details
- Born: Robert Philip Kaplan; December 27, 1936 Toronto, Ontario, Canada
- Died: November 5, 2012 (aged 75) Toronto, Ontario, Canada
- Resting place: Beth Tzedec Memorial Park
- Party: Liberal
- Spouse: Estherelke Tanenbaum Kaplan (1940–2009)
- Relations: Michael Kaplan (brother)
- Children: Jennifer Mia Kaplan, John David Kaplan, Raquel Katherine Shulman
- Parent(s): Solomon Charles and Pearl (Grafstein) Kaplan
- Education: University of Toronto
- Occupation: Politician, lawyer
- Cabinet: Solicitor General of Canada (1980–1984)
- Portfolio: Parliamentary Secretary to the Minister of Finance (1976–1977); Parliamentary Secretary to the Minister of National Health and Welfare (1975–1976)

Robert Philip Kaplan PC QC (December 27, 1936 – November 5, 2012) was a Canadian politician and lawyer.

== Life and career ==
Born in Toronto, Ontario, to Solomon and Pearl Kaplan and brother of Michael Kaplan. Kaplan attended and graduated from Forest Hill Collegiate after spending one year at Vaughan Road Collegiate Institute in Toronto, then received a Bachelor of Arts in 1958 and an LL.B in 1961 from the University of Toronto. In 1963, he was called to the Ontario Bar.

He was first elected as a Liberal Member of Parliament for the Toronto riding of Don Valley in 1968, beating the Progressive Conservative candidate, Dalton Camp. He lost to PC challenger James Gillies in 1972. In 1974, he switched ridings to York Centre and won by over 16,000 votes, holding the seat for the Liberals after James Edgar Walker's retirement. In 1978, he introduced a notable private member's bill: Bill C-215, An Act respecting war criminals in Canada, which would have amended the Citizenship Act by stripping citizenship from Canadians if they had been convicted of war crimes. The final report of the Deschênes Commission, published in 1986, later stated that the bill would not have achieved the effect Kaplan hoped to achieve because there was no capacity to apply the Geneva Conventions retroactively.

He was re-elected in the 1979, 1980, 1984 and 1988 elections. He was the Solicitor General of Canada from 1980 to 1984, under Prime Ministers Pierre Trudeau and John Turner. He oversaw the creation of the Canadian Security Intelligence Service and the Security Intelligence Review Committee and the termination of the Royal Canadian Mounted Police Security Service. Kaplan was also responsible for bringing in the Young Offenders Act in 1984 which established 12 as the minimum age for criminal charges, brought in shorter sentences for most offenders under the age of 18, and banned the public identification of youths charged or convicted of criminal acts in most circumstances. He also pressed for and oversaw the extradition of Helmut Rauca to West Germany for war crimes.

Kaplan retired from the House of Commons on the call of the 1993 Canadian federal election. He subsequently served as the Honorary Consul of the Republic of Kazakhstan for Canada and was awarded the Order of Kazakhstan by its president in recognition of his service to the Republic. He was a director of PetroKazakhstan Inc., Platexco Inc., and Rex Diamond Mining Corp. In 2004, he joined the Board of Directors of European Goldfields, a Canadian-based resource company involved in the acquisition, exploration and development of mineral properties in Romania and the Balkans.

Kaplan died of cancer on November 5, 2012. He was 75 years old.

== Archives ==
There is a Robert Kaplan fonds at Library and Archives Canada.
