= John Angus MacMillan =

Canadian politician

Member of the Legislative Assembly of Saskatchewan for Wadena
- In office 1917–1921
- Preceded by: Herbert Pierce
- Succeeded by: William Henry McKinnon

Member of Parliament for Mackenzie
- In office October 1933 – June 1945
- Preceded by: Milton Neil Campbell
- Succeeded by: Alexander Malcolm Nicholson

Personal details
- Born: 27 March 1889 East Lake Ainslie, Nova Scotia, Canada
- Died: 12 August 1956 (aged 67) Wadena, Saskatchewan, Canada
- Party: Liberal
- Profession: barrister

John Angus MacMillan (27 March 1889 – 12 August 1956) was a Liberal party member of the House of Commons of Canada. He was born in Nova Scotia and became a barrister.

MacMillan attended Dalhousie University. He became mayor of Wadena, Saskatchewan in 1917 and that same year was elected a Liberal member of the Legislative Assembly of Saskatchewan for the Wadena provincial riding. He served in that legislature until his defeat in the 1921 provincial election.

He was first elected to Parliament at the Mackenzie riding in a by-election on 23 October 1933, after two previous unsuccessful attempts there in 1925 and 1926. MacMillan was re-elected in 1935 and served a complete term in the 18th Canadian Parliament. In the 1945 election, MacMillan was defeated by Alexander Malcolm Nicholson of the Co-operative Commonwealth Federation. MacMillan died at a hospital in Wadena in 1956.
