= Norman Brudy =

Canadian politician

Norman Brudy (1919–2000) was a salesman, government lobbyist and a Canadian communist politician and perennial candidate. He served for a time as leader of the Communist Party of Alberta.

== Political career ==
Brudy ran as a Labor-Progressive Party candidate in the 1953 Canadian federal election. He was badly defeated finishing last out of five candidates in the Regina City electoral district to incumbent Co-operative Commonwealth Federation Member of Parliament Alfred Claude Ellis.

In 1968, Brudy had a falling-out with the Communist Party and was squeezed out of the executive committee after criticizing the party's policies and the Soviet Union.

Brudy moved to Toronto, Ontario and began lobbying the provincial government for rent control laws, which were enacted in 1975.

He ran for federal office again as a candidate for the Communist Party of Canada in the Don Valley electoral district for the 1974 Canadian federal election. He was defeated finishing second last out of six candidates losing to incumbent Progressive Conservative Member of Parliament James McPhail Gillies.

Brudy ran for the federal Communists again ten years later in 1984 Canadian federal election. He finished sixth place out of seven candidates in the electoral district of Scarborough East losing to Progressive Conservative candidate Bob Hicks.

After the federal election, Brudy moved to Alberta and became leader of the Communist Party (Alberta). He would take over leadership of the party after the 1986 Alberta general election from David Wallis. The second election he was leader for was the 1989 Alberta general election. He led the party into that one fielding just two candidates and winning 85 votes. He retired as leader in 1992, and the party leadership transferred to Naomi Rankin. Brudy died in 2000.

Party political offices
Preceded by David Wallis	Leader of the Communist Party (Alberta); 1986?–1992	Succeeded by Naomi Rankin
