= Edward L. Cash =

Canadian politician

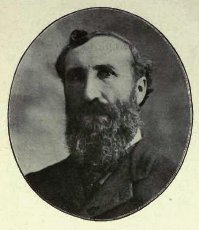

Member of the Canadian Parliament for Mackenzie, Northwest Territories (later Saskatchewan)^{1}
- In office 1904–1917
- Preceded by: Electoral district was created in 1903.
- Succeeded by: John Flaws Reid

Personal details
- Born: 26 December 1849 Markham, Canada West
- Died: 31 May 1922 (aged 72)
- Party: Liberal
- ^{1}After the creation of the province of Saskatchewan in 1905, Mackenzie became as an electoral district in the province.

Edward L. Cash (26 December 1849 – 31 May 1922) was a Canadian physician and politician.

Born in Markham, Canada West, the son of David Cash and Elizabeth Eckardt, Cash received his M.D. from the Victoria University in Cobourg, Ontario in 1871. From 1871 to 1896, he resided in United States and was elected County Clerk and Clerk of the District Court for Rock in Nebraska. In 1897, he started practicing medicine in Yorkton, Saskatchewan. Cash was a founder of the Yorkton Club, an elite social club created on 3 April 1907 under the Yorkton Club Act 1907.

He was first elected to the House of Commons of Canada in 1904 for the electoral district of Mackenzie. A Liberal, he was re-elected in 1908 and 1911.
