= Jack Scowen =

Canadian politician

Member of Parliament for Mackenzie
- In office 5 November 1984 – 1 October 1988
- Preceded by: Stanley Korchinski
- Succeeded by: Vic Althouse

Personal details
- Born: 12 December 1925 Limerick, Saskatchewan, Canada
- Died: 27 May 2001 (aged 75)
- Party: Progressive Conservative
- Profession: farmer

Jack Douglas Scowen (12 December 1925 – 27 May 2001) was a Progressive Conservative party member of the House of Commons of Canada. He was born in Limerick, Saskatchewan and became a farmer and seed grower by career.

He narrowly defeated Mel McCorriston for the Mackenzie riding in the 1984 federal election, thus he served in the 33rd Canadian Parliament. He was defeated in the 1988 federal election by Vic Althouse of the New Democratic Party.

In 1988, Scowen and fellow Progressive Conservative member Ronald Stewart openly disagreed with their party leader, Prime Minister Brian Mulroney, when the government was supporting efforts to translate Saskatchewan provincial legislation into French in response to a Supreme Court of Canada ruling. Scowen and Stewart believed such efforts for the province's 23,000 Fransaskois would be expensive and unnecessary.

Scowen was based in Nipawin, Saskatchewan when he died in 2001.
