= Anita Bergman =

Member of the Legislative Assembly of Saskatchewan, Canada

Member of the Legislative Assembly of Saskatchewan
- In office 1994–1995
- Preceded by: John Solomon
- Succeeded by: riding dissolved
- Constituency: Regina North West

Personal details
- Born: 1945 (age 80–81)
- Party: Liberal

Anita Bergman is a Canadian politician, who sat in the Legislative Assembly of Saskatchewan from 1994 to 1995. A member of the Saskatchewan Liberal Party caucus, she represented the electoral district of Regina North West.

Bergman was first elected in a by-election in 1994, following the resignation of John Solomon. In the 1995 election, she ran for reelection in the redistributed riding of Regina Qu'Appelle Valley, but was defeated by Suzanne Murray.
