= National Credit Control =

John Bernard Ball ran as a National Credit Control candidate in the federal 1957 federal election in Canada in the riding of Regina City in Saskatchewan. He won 122 of the 40,813 votes cast (0.3% of the popular vote).

Ball ran to promote "National Credit Control", a "universal monetary system" that he developed which was similar to social credit.

"National Credit Control" would introduce a credit card system of currency, and nationalize the investment capital of the country. Government would be divorced from industry, and become the central accounting agency for the economy, controlling the master balance sheet of industry. In doing so, all industrial debt would be eliminated, and the government would be placed on a cash basis, without borrowing from its citizens.

The NCC system would guarantee industry against bankruptcy, and abolish unemployment insurance in favour of a full work schedule for all workers. Farmers would be guaranteed the same wages as urban management, and seasonal calamity on farms would be "written off in the nation's accounting system".

NCC would bypass local taxation and abolish taxes on land and buildings. NCC would also abolish taxes on industry, which would be forced to operate at the "labour cost of investment" without profits. Industrial profits would be transferred to the tax assessment. The only taxes in an NCC system would be a consumer sales tax on goods and services. Urban, rural and provincial governments would not raise their own taxes: they would be funded by grants from the federal government. Public works would be tendered to private industry, instead of being undertaken by the government.

Capital goods would be sold to industry on a "lease-rental-depreciation" plan of repayment to perpetuate employment. Profits arising from the rental of buildings would be abolished in the accounting system of private enterprise.

== Sources ==
- Parliament of Canada History of the Federal Electoral Ridings since 1867
- Regina Leader-Post, June 8, 1957, page 3.

== See also ==
- List of political parties in Canada
