= Gladstone Ferrie =

Canadian politician

Member of Parliament for Mackenzie
- In office June 1949 – August 1953
- Preceded by: Alexander Malcolm Nicholson
- Succeeded by: Alexander Malcolm Nicholson

Personal details
- Born: Gladstone Mansfield Ferrie; 21 November 1892 Denver, Colorado, United States
- Died: 4 July 1955 (aged 62) Invermay, Saskatchewan
- Party: Liberal
- Spouse(s): Mabel H. Bailey m. 17 October 1915 (1893-1990)
- Profession: Farmer, livestock dealer

Gladstone Mansfield Ferrie (21 November 1892 – 4 July 1955) was a Liberal party member of the House of Commons of Canada. He was born in Denver, Colorado, United States and came to Canada in 1906. He attended Mew Hall School in England at Burton on Trent, then became a farmer and livestock dealer by career.

Ferrie served in World War I under the 2nd Engineers as a corporal. For 20 years, he was also a reeve of Rural Municipality of Invermay No. 305.

He was first elected to Parliament at the Mackenzie riding in the 1949 general election by defeating Co-operative Commonwealth Federation incumbent Alexander Malcolm Nicholson. After completing his only term in the House of Commons, he was defeated by Nicholson in the 1953 election.
