= James Gillies =

Canadian politician (1924–2015)

Member of Parliament for Don Valley
- In office 20 October 1972 – 21 May 1979
- Preceded by: Bob Kaplan
- Succeeded by: Riding abolished

Personal details
- Born: James McPhail Gillies; 2 November 1924 Teeswater, Ontario, Canada
- Died: 13 December 2015 (aged 91) Toronto, Ontario, Canada
- Party: Progressive Conservative
- Spouse: Elizabeth Louise Matson (m. 1953)
- Profession: economist, educator

Military service
- Allegiance: Canadian
- Branch/service: Royal Canadian Air Force
- Years of service: 1944–1945
- Rank: Flight crew

James McPhail (Jim) Gillies, CM (2 November 1924 – 13 December 2015) was a politician and economist in Canada. He was a Progressive Conservative member of the House of Commons of Canada from 1972 to 1979, elected in the Toronto, Ontario, riding of Don Valley. He taught economics at the Faculty of Administrative Studies at York University and was sought after for commentary on economic issues.

== Background ==
Gillies attended public and secondary school in Teeswater, Ontario. He then went to London, Ontario to attend University of Western Ontario. He joined the Royal Canadian Air Force in 1944 during World War II. In 1945 he continued his education in the United States at Brown University and Indiana University Bloomington. He joined the faculty of University of California, Los Angeles's Graduate School of Management in 1951 and remained there until his return to Canada in 1965 where he was the first dean of York University's Faculty of Administrative Studies, now named the Schulich School of Business.

Gillies was chair of the Ontario Economic Council in 1971 and 1972.

== Politics ==
Gillies ran as a Progressive Conservative candidate in the 1972 federal election. He was elected in the riding of Don Valley defeating Liberal incumbent Robert Kaplan by 6,135 votes. He was re-elected in 1974 and left federal office after completing his term in the 30th Canadian Parliament. In 1976, Gillies was a candidate for the leadership of the Progressive Conservative Party of Canada, placing 9th out of 11 candidates and withdrawing after the first ballot. He was a senior policy advisor to Prime Minister Joe Clark in the brief PC government of 1979–80.

== Later life ==
He was named a professor emeritus of the Schulich School of Business and continued to provide commentary on economic matters. He died on 13 December 2015, aged 91.

== Works ==
- Gillies, James M. (2010). From vision to reality: the founding of the Faculty of Administrative Studies at York University, 1965-1972. ISBN 9780978482725
- Gillies, James M. (1981). Where business fails. IRPP. ISBN 978-0-920380-53-6.

== Archives ==
There is a James McPhail Gillies fonds at Library and Archives Canada. Archival reference number is R3294.
