= Humboldt—Lake Centre =

Former federal electoral district in Saskatchewan, Canada

Humboldt—Lake Centre was a federal electoral district in Saskatchewan, Canada, that was represented in the House of Commons of Canada from 1979 to 1988. This riding was created in 1976 from parts of Mackenzie, Moose Jaw, Regina East, Regina—Lake Centre, Saskatoon—Biggar and Saskatoon—Humboldt ridings.

The district was abolished in 1987 when it was redistributed into the ridings of Mackenzie, Moose Jaw—Lake Centre, Regina—Qu'Appelle, Saskatoon—Dundurn and Saskatoon—Humboldt.

== Members of Parliament ==
The following were Members of Parliament for Humboldt—Lake Centre:

1. George Richardson, Progressive Conservative (1979–1980)
2. Vic Althouse, New Democratic Party (1980–1988)

== Election results ==
1979 Canadian federal election
Party	Candidate	Votes
Progressive Conservative	RICHARDSON, George	13,066
New Democratic	ALTHOUSE, Vic	12,681
Liberal	NIEMAN, Doug	6,967
Social Credit	BRASSARD, Paul J.	668

1980 Canadian federal election
Party	Candidate	Votes
New Democratic	ALTHOUSE, Vic	13,243
Progressive Conservative	RICHARDSON, George	11,591
Liberal	BENCHARSKI, Joe	6,981

1984 Canadian federal election
Party	Candidate	Votes
New Democratic	ALTHOUSE, Vic	15,087
Progressive Conservative	MEIKLEJOHN, Ray	13,166
Liberal	DOSMAN, James	6,005
Confederation of Regions	HOLTORF, Gary D.	429

== See also ==
- List of Canadian electoral districts
- Historical federal electoral districts of Canada
