= Donald McNiven =

Canadian politician (1887–1961)

Member of Parliament for Regina City
- In office October 1935 – October 1944

Personal details
- Born: Donald Alexander McNiven; 23 June 1887 Walkerton, Ontario
- Died: 31 July 1961 (aged 74)
- Party: Liberal
- Spouse(s): Leila Maud Higginbotham m. 13 October 1915
- Profession: barrister, judge

Donald Alexander McNiven (23 June 1887 – 31 July 1961) was a Canadian politician on the provincial and federal level. He was born in Walkerton, Ontario and became a barrister and judge.

McNiven attended public and secondary schools at Virden, Manitoba. He graduated from the University of Manitoba in 1909 with a Bachelor of Arts degree.

He was elected as a provincial Liberal member to the Legislative Assembly of Saskatchewan at the Regina City riding in a by-election on 19 September 1922. He was a member of that legislature until his defeat in the 1929 provincial election.

McNiven was elected to the House of Commons of Canada for the Liberal party at the Regina City riding in the 1935 general election and re-elected there in 1940.

McNiven resigned from the House of Commons on 19 October 1944 before the end of the 19th Canadian Parliament to become a judge on the Saskatchewan Court of King's Bench. In that same year, he also began to serve on various wartime-related boards. In 1949, he was made a judge of the Court of Appeal for Saskatchewan where he presided until shortly before his death in July 1961.
