= Regina City =

Former federal electoral district in Saskatchewan, Canada

Coordinates: 50.4483°N 104.6166°W

Regina City was a federal electoral district in Saskatchewan, Canada, that was represented in the House of Commons of Canada from 1935 to 1968. This riding was created in 1933 from parts of Regina riding. It consisted initially of the city of Regina.

In 1952, it was redefined to consist of a part of the city of Regina bounded by a line drawn from the intersection of Campbell Street and the right-of-way of the Canadian National Railway east along the right-of-way and McKinley Avenue, south along Park Street, west along Twenty-fifth Avenue, north along Campbell Street to the right-of-way of the Canadian Pacific Railway, northwest following the western limit of the property of the Royal Canadian Mounted Police, east along Dewdney Avenue, and north along Campbell Street to the CNR. It also included a rural area outside of the city north of Wascana Creek.

It was abolished in 1966 when it was redistributed into Regina East and Regina—Lake Centre ridings.

== Historical boundaries ==
=== Historical boundaries ===
1933 representation order

1947 representation order

1952 representation order

== Election results ==
1935 Canadian federal election
Party	Candidate	Votes
Liberal	Donald Alexander McNiven	10,235
Conservative	Franklin White Turnbull	7,986
Co-operative Commonwealth	Hugh MacLean	4,706
Social Credit	Ernest Wesley Hinkson	1,874

1940 Canadian federal election
Party	Candidate	Votes
Liberal	Donald Alexander McNiven	14,434
National Government	Murdock Alexander MacPherson	12,475
Co-operative Commonwealth	John Oliver Probe	2,855
Conservative	John Ivor Guest	602

1945 Canadian federal election
Party	Candidate	Votes
Co-operative Commonwealth	John Oliver Probe	13,799
Liberal	John Francis Sweeney	10,804
Progressive Conservative	Neil Joseph Taylor	6,973
Labor–Progressive	Florence Theodore	441

1949 Canadian federal election
Party	Candidate	Votes
Liberal	Emmet Andrew McCusker	14,356
Co-operative Commonwealth	John Oliver Probe	14,194
Progressive Conservative	Robert Harper Acheson	4,060
Labor–Progressive	William Charles Beeching	409

1953 Canadian federal election
Party	Candidate	Votes
Co-operative Commonwealth	Claude Ellis	14,558
Liberal	Emmet Andrew McCusker	13,008
Progressive Conservative	Cecil Mears	2,958
Social Credit	Bert Louis Iannone	1,014
Labor–Progressive	Norman Brudy	294

1957 Canadian federal election
Party	Candidate	Votes
Co-operative Commonwealth	Claude Ellis	14,561
Liberal	Emmet Andrew McCusker	12,456
Progressive Conservative	Kenneth Hamill More	10,504
Social Credit	Ralph Purdy	2,958
Labor–Progressive	William Charles Beeching	212
National Credit Control	John Bernard Ball	122

1958 Canadian federal election
Party	Candidate	Votes
Progressive Conservative	Ken More	24,424
Co-operative Commonwealth	Claude Ellis	12,391
Liberal	Raymond Alexander MacDonald	7,844
Labor–Progressive	William C. Beeching	262

1962 Canadian federal election
Party	Candidate	Votes
Progressive Conservative	Ken More	22,164
New Democratic	Tommy Douglas	12,736
Liberal	Frederick William Johnson	7,529
Social Credit	Arthur F. Boehme	1,583

1963 Canadian federal election
Party	Candidate	Votes
Progressive Conservative	Ken More	19,605
Liberal	Joseph A. Young	12,234
New Democratic	Claude Ellis	9,016
Social Credit	Arthur F. Boehme	1,360
Independent	Frederick Allan Miller	135
Communist	William C. Beeching	129

1965 Canadian federal election
Party	Candidate	Votes
Progressive Conservative	Ken More	15,437
Liberal	Joseph A. Young	11,018
New Democratic	John Burton	10,955
Social Credit	Thora Gietz	721
Communist	William C. Beeching	179

== See also ==
- List of Canadian electoral districts
- Historical federal electoral districts of Canada
