= Don Valley (Canadian electoral district) =

Former federal electoral district in Ontario, Canada

Ontario electoral district
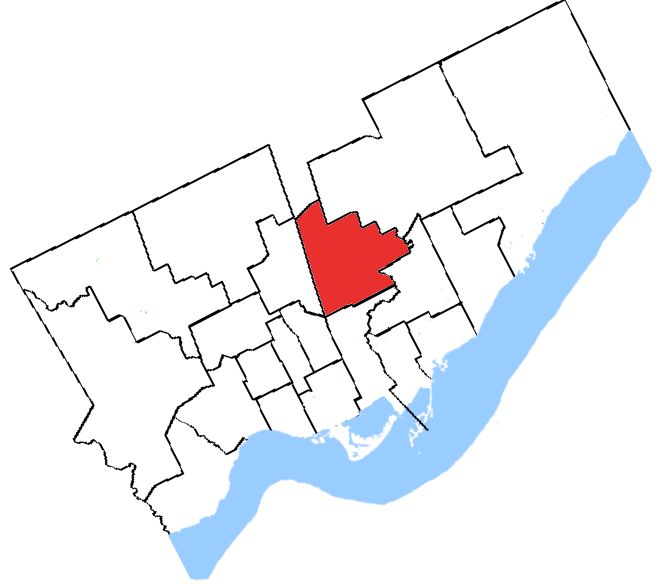
- Don Valley in relation to other Metro Toronto ridings of that era

Defunct federal electoral district
- Legislature: House of Commons
- District created: 1966
- District abolished: 1976
- First contested: 1968
- Last contested: 1974

Don Valley was a federal electoral district of the House of Commons of Canada from 1968 to 1979. It was located in the province of Ontario. This riding was created in 1966 from parts of Eglinton, York East and York—Scarborough ridings.

It consisted of the part of Metropolitan Toronto bounded by a line beginning where the Don River would meet Donlands Avenue, east along the Don River, north along the West Branch of the Don River, east along Eglinton Avenue East, north along the Don River, west along Lawrence Avenue East, north along Don Mills Road, west along Bond Avenue, north along Leslie Street, west along York Mills Road, north along Bayview Avenue, southwest along Highway 401, south along Yonge Street, east along Merton Street, south along Bayview Avenue, east and south along the northern limit of the Township of East York, and east along the Don River to Donlands Avenue.

The electoral district was abolished in 1976 when it was redistributed between Don Valley West, Rosedale and York East ridings.

== Members of Parliament ==
This riding has elected the following members of Parliament:

Parliament	Years	Member	Party
Riding created from Eglinton, York East and York—Scarborough
28th	1968–1972	Bob Kaplan	Liberal
29th	1972–1974	James Gillies	Progressive Conservative
30th	1974–1979	James Gillies	Progressive Conservative
Riding dissolved into Don Valley West, Rosedale and York East

== Election results ==
1968 Canadian federal election
Party	Candidate	Votes
Liberal	Bob Kaplan	27,335
Progressive Conservative	Dalton Camp	22,359
New Democratic	Margaret Murray	3,863

1972 Canadian federal election
Party	Candidate	Votes
Progressive Conservative	James Gillies	30,764
Liberal	Bob Kaplan	24,629
New Democratic	Jean Smith	5,110

1974 Canadian federal election
Party	Candidate	Votes
Progressive Conservative	James Gillies	30,764
Liberal	W. Grant Ross	23,802
New Democratic	Jean Smith	4,104
Independent	Vincent H. Miller	271
Communist	Norman Brudy	75
Marxist–Leninist	Jeanne Deadman	70

== See also ==
- List of Canadian electoral districts
- Historical federal electoral districts of Canada
