= Bill Sveinson =

Canadian politician (1946–2020)

Member of the Legislative Assembly of Saskatchewan
- In office 1982–1986
- Preceded by: John Solomon
- Succeeded by: John Solomon
- Constituency: Regina North West

Personal details
- Born: July 7, 1946 Wadena, Saskatchewan
- Died: December 17, 2020 (aged 74) Edmonton, Alberta
- Party: Progressive Conservative Party of Saskatchewan (until 1983); Saskatchewan Liberal Party (1983–1985); Western Canada Concept Party of Saskatchewan
- Education: University of Saskatchewan

William Martin Sveinson (July 7, 1946 – December 17, 2020) was a Canadian professional poker player and politician. Sveinson served as a Member of the Legislative Assembly (MLA) in Saskatchewan. He was first elected under the Conservatives in 1982 and represented the riding of Regina North West.

Sveinson crossed the floor in 1983 and was, for a time, the only Member of the Legislative Assembly (MLA) for the Saskatchewan Liberal Party, but he was ousted from the party in 1985 as a result of apparent disagreements between Sveinson and Ralph Goodale (then leader of the Saskatchewan Liberal party) over legislative questioning tactics.

Oral questions during question period were a tactic used by opposition members to question the government. An oversight allowed Sveinson to continue with his oral questioning preventing an orderly closure to question period thus stopping the business of the house. The rules allowed question period to continue indefinitely. The purpose was to force the government to settle with constituents who had financial promises from the provincial government unfulfilled.

Sveinson continued to sit as an independent MLA until he joined the Western Canada Concept Party of Saskatchewan in 1986. The WCC had no members in the Legislative Assembly of Saskatchewan at that time. The WCC advocated the separation from Canada of the four western provinces (British Columbia, Alberta, Saskatchewan and Manitoba).

He subsequently convinced Progressive Conservative MLA, Lloyd Hampton to join him in Opposition. This gave the WCC two seats in the legislature, enough to receive official party standing, and therefore a research budget paid for by the Legislature. Official party status gave the two members research funding to provide effective opposition. Subsequently, the rules were changed to prevent future use of this tactic.

The WCC was split over whether to accept the two new members: the party leader supported accepting them, while the party president was opposed. After a few months, Sveinson and Hampton were expelled from the party.

His political tenure ended with the 1986 provincial election. Sveinson died on December 17, 2020.
