= Ron Atchison =

Canadian football player

Profile
- Position: Defensive tackle

Personal information
- Born: April 21, 1930; Central Butte, Saskatchewan, Canada
- Died: June 23, 2010 (aged 80); Regina, Saskatchewan, Canada
- Listed height: 6 ft 3 in (1.91 m)
- Listed weight: 235 lb (107 kg)

Career information
- CJFL: Saskatoon Hilltops

Career history
- 1952–1968: Saskatchewan Roughriders

Awards and highlights
- Grey Cup champion (1966); 6× CFL West All-Star (1956, 1960–1964)
- Canadian Football Hall of Fame (Class of 1978)

Ronald William Atchison (April 21, 1930 – June 23, 2010) was a Canadian professional football defensive lineman who played for the Saskatchewan Roughriders from 1952 through 1968. He was part of the Grey Cup championship-winning Roughriders in 1966. Atchison was inducted into the Canadian Football Hall of Fame in 1978. He was inducted into the Saskatchewan Sports Hall of Fame in 1980.

Born in Central Butte and raised in Saskatoon, Atchison played for the Saskatoon Hilltops from 1947 to 1949. In 1976, in recognition, the Hilltops named their practice field and permanent quarters after him.

During Atchison's time as a member of the Roughriders, he was named to the CFL's Western All-Star team 6 times as a defensive tackle.
