= Vic Althouse =

Canadian politician

Member of Parliament for Humboldt—Lake Centre
- In office April 14, 1980 – 1988
- Preceded by: George Richardson
- Succeeded by: riding abolished

Member of Parliament for Mackenzie
- In office 1988 – April 27, 1997
- Preceded by: Jack Scowen
- Succeeded by: riding abolished

Personal details
- Born: Victor Fredrich Althouse; April 15, 1937 (age 88) Wadena, Saskatchewan
- Party: New Democratic Party
- Spouse: Cicely Margaret Althouse
- Profession: Farmer

Victor Fredrich "Vic" Althouse (born April 15, 1937, in Wadena, Saskatchewan) is a former Canadian politician. Althouse represented the electoral districts of Humboldt—Lake Centre from 1980 to 1988 and Mackenzie from 1988 to 1997 in the House of Commons of Canada.

He was a member of the New Democratic Party.
