= Mackenzie (federal electoral district) =

Former Canadian electoral district

Mackenzie was a federal electoral district in Saskatchewan, Canada, that was represented in the House of Commons of Canada from 1904 to 1997. This riding was created in 1903, when Saskatchewan was still a part of the North-West Territories. In 1905, when Saskatchewan was created, the district was retained in the province.

The riding was abolished in 1996, and parts of it were merged into the districts of Blackstrap, Churchill River, Prince Albert, Qu'Appelle, Regina—Lumsden—Lake Centre, Saskatoon—Humboldt and Yorkton—Melville.

== History ==
=== Historical boundaries ===
1905 representation order

1914 representation order

1924 representation order

1933 representation order

1947 representation order

1952 representation order

1966 representation order

1976 representation order

1987 representation order

=== Members of Parliament ===
Mackenzie elected the following members of Parliament:

1. Edward L. Cash, Liberal (1904–1917)
2. John Flaws Reid, Unionist (1917–1921)
3. Milton Campbell, Progressive (1921–1933)
4. John Angus MacMillan, Liberal (1933–1945)
5. Alexander Nicholson (first term), Co-operative Commonwealth Federation (CCF) (1945–1949)
6. Gladstone Ferrie, Liberal (1949–1953)
7. Alexander Nicholson (second term), CCF (1953–1958)
8. Stanley Korchinski, Progressive Conservative (1958–1984)
9. Jack Scowen, Progressive Conservative (1984–1988)
10. Vic Althouse, New Democrat (1988–1997)

== Election results ==
1908 Canadian federal election
Party	Candidate	Votes
Liberal	Edward L. Cash	2,328
Conservative	Robert Buchanan	1,217

1911 Canadian federal election
Party	Candidate	Votes
Liberal	Edward L. Cash	4,090
Conservative	Charles Donald Livingstone	1,739

1917 Canadian federal election
Party	Candidate	Votes
Government (Unionist)	John Flaws Reid	3,047
Government (Unionist)	George Washington McPhee	2,370

1921 Canadian federal election
Party	Candidate	Votes
Progressive	Milton Neil Campbell	5,381
Liberal	Michael Clark	3,025
Labour	Wasyl Swystun	1,896
Conservative	William David Dunlop	1,338

1925 Canadian federal election
Party	Candidate	Votes
Progressive	Milton Neil Campbell	3,609
Liberal	John Angus MacMillan	2,496

1926 Canadian federal election
Party	Candidate	Votes
Progressive	Milton Neil Campbell	5,701
Liberal	John Angus MacMillan	4,664

1930 Canadian federal election
Party	Candidate	Votes
Progressive	Milton Neil Campbell	6,578
Liberal	Allan Grant McLean	3,502
Liberal	Wasyl Swystun	3,432

By-election on 23 October 1933 On Campbell's acceptance of an office of emolument under the Crown, 6 February 1933
Party	Candidate	Votes
Liberal	John Angus MacMillan	5,926
Co-operative Commonwealth	Lewis St. George Stubbs	4,312
Conservative	Stanley Howard Edgar	1,541
United Farmers	Louis Philip McNamee	713

1935 Canadian federal election
Party	Candidate	Votes
Liberal	John Angus MacMillan	6,595
Co-operative Commonwealth	Alexander Malcolm Nicholson	4,451
Social Credit	Benjamin Franklin Graham	3,059
Communist	John Albert Padget	1,234

1940 Canadian federal election
Party	Candidate	Votes
Co-operative Commonwealth	Alexander Malcolm Nicholson	10,207
Liberal	Jim Barrie	9,211
Communist	Walter Ernest Wiggins	819

1945 Canadian federal election
Party	Candidate	Votes
Co-operative Commonwealth	Alexander Malcolm Nicholson	9,037
Liberal	John Angus MacMillan	5,306
Social Credit	Onofry M. Swystun	2,143
Progressive Conservative	John Robeson Taylor	1,580

1949 Canadian federal election
Party	Candidate	Votes
Liberal	Gladstone M. Ferrie	7,564
Co-operative Commonwealth	Alexander Malcolm Nicholson	6,209
Labor–Progressive	William Michael Berezowski	1,122
Social Credit	Frederick Albert A. Patrick	851
Progressive Conservative	Samuel Edward Hall	697

1953 Canadian federal election
Party	Candidate	Votes
Co-operative Commonwealth	Alexander Malcolm Nicholson	8,021
Liberal	Gladstone M. Ferrie	7,466
Social Credit	Frederick Albert A. Patrick	1,386
Progressive Conservative	Samuel Edward Hall	840
Labor–Progressive	Edna Juletta Williams	554

1957 Canadian federal election
Party	Candidate	Votes
Co-operative Commonwealth	Alexander Malcolm Nicholson	7,231
Liberal	Joseph Marshall	5,299
Progressive Conservative	Stanley Korchinski	3,289
Social Credit	Robert S. Claypool	1,956

1958 Canadian federal election
Party	Candidate	Votes
Progressive Conservative	Stanley Korchinski	9,138
Co-operative Commonwealth	Alexander Malcolm Nicholson	5,559
Liberal	Joseph Marshall	2,511

1962 Canadian federal election
Party	Candidate	Votes
Progressive Conservative	Stanley Korchinski	9,457
New Democratic	Charles S. Mitchell	4,360
Liberal	John J. Plaxin	4,348
Social Credit	Lorne M. Brandon	767
Communist	Fred R. Morris	317

1963 Canadian federal election
Party	Candidate	Votes
Progressive Conservative	Stanley Korchinski	10,010
New Democratic	James Forster	3,706
Liberal	John Nakrayko	2,940
Social Credit	George Johnson	691
Communist	Fred R. Morris	179

1965 Canadian federal election
Party	Candidate	Votes
Progressive Conservative	Stanley Korchinski	9,760
New Democratic	Joe Zbitnew	4,288
Liberal	John Sebree	3,033

1968 Canadian federal election
Party	Candidate	Votes
Progressive Conservative	Stanley Korchinski	8,578
New Democratic	Joe Zbitnew	7,512
Liberal	Joseph Wayne Zimmer	4,199

1972 Canadian federal election
Party	Candidate	Votes
Progressive Conservative	Stanley Korchinski	8,164
New Democratic	Lars Elroy Bracken	7,675
Liberal	William John McHugh	3,311
Social Credit	John Dashchuk	513

1974 Canadian federal election
Party	Candidate	Votes
Progressive Conservative	Stanley Korchinski	8,292
New Democratic	Lars Elroy Bracken	7,590
Liberal	Michel Lucien J. Riou	4,190
Social Credit	John Dashchuk	440

1979 Canadian federal election
Party	Candidate	Votes
Progressive Conservative	Stanley Korchinski	13,050
New Democratic	Dale R. Schmeichel	10,370
Liberal	Keith Geddes	3,421
Social Credit	John Dashchuk	384

1980 Canadian federal election
Party	Candidate	Votes
Progressive Conservative	Stanley Korchinski	10,794
New Democratic	Lars Elroy Bracken	10,435
Liberal	Keith Geddes	4,548
Communist	Lloyd Mattson	165

1984 Canadian federal election
Party	Candidate	Votes
Progressive Conservative	Jack Scowen	11,403
New Democratic	Mel McCorriston	10,848
Liberal	Garfield Lutz	4,961
Confederation of Regions	Harold E. Schultz	1,269

1988 Canadian federal election
Party	Candidate	Votes
New Democratic	Vic Althouse	15,931
Progressive Conservative	Jack Scowen	12,649
Liberal	Garfield C. Lutz	4,988
Reform	John Froese	689

1993 Canadian federal election
Party	Candidate	Votes
New Democratic	Vic Althouse	9,423
Reform	Brian Maurice Fitzpatrick	8,202
Liberal	Garfield Lutz	8,078
Progressive Conservative	Sherwin Petersen	3,887
Christian Heritage	Ken Goudy	599
Canada Party	Tony Panas	112

== See also ==
- List of Canadian electoral districts
- Historical federal electoral districts of Canada
