= Regina West =

Former federal electoral district in Saskatchewan, Canada

Regina West was a federal electoral district in Saskatchewan, Canada, that was represented in the House of Commons of Canada from 1979 to 1988. This riding was created in 1976 from parts of Regina—Lake Centre riding. It consisted of the part of the city of Regina lying west of Albert Street, and adjacent rural areas and Indian reserves.

It was abolished in 1987 when it was redistributed into Regina—Lumsden and Regina—Wascana ridings. The representative was Les Benjamin.

== Members of Parliament ==
This riding elected the following members of Parliament:

Parliament	Years	Member	Party
Regina West; Riding established from Regina—Lake Centre
31st	1979–1980	Les Benjamin	New Democratic
32nd	1980–1984	Les Benjamin	New Democratic
33rd	1984–1988	Les Benjamin	New Democratic
Riding dissolved into Regina—Lumsden and Regina—Wascana

== Election results ==
1979 Canadian federal election
Party	Candidate	Votes
New Democratic	BENJAMIN, Les	19,340
Progressive Conservative	FULLER, Gerry	14,217
Liberal	CAMERON, Stuart	11,817
Social Credit	WAGNER, Ewald K.	175
Marxist–Leninist	PARTRIDGE, Al	58

1980 Canadian federal election
Party	Candidate	Votes
New Democratic	BENJAMIN, Les	17,353
Progressive Conservative	BOZAK, Spence	13,374
Liberal	FAVEL, Fred	10,190
Not affiliated	LAMPERT, David S.	151
Marxist–Leninist	CORKILL, Keith	55

1984 Canadian federal election
Party	Candidate	Votes
New Democratic	BENJAMIN, Les	23,865
Progressive Conservative	STEPHENS, Dan	16,066
Liberal	MAZURAK, Steve	10,405
Rhinoceros	LA ROSE, Stephen the Hoser	313
Confederation of Regions	KING, Frederick B.	247
Communist	CARIOU, Kimball	75

== See also ==
- List of Canadian electoral districts
- Historical federal electoral districts of Canada
