= Regina—Lake Centre =

Former federal electoral district in Saskatchewan, Canada

Regina—Lake Centre was a federal electoral district in Saskatchewan, Canada, that was represented in the House of Commons of Canada from 1968 to 1979. This riding was created in 1966 from parts of Humboldt—Melfort, Moose Jaw—Lake Centre, Qu'Appelle, Regina City, Rosetown—Biggar, Rosthern and Yorkton ridings.

It was abolished in 1976 when it was redistributed into Humboldt—Lake Centre, Moose Jaw and Regina West ridings.

== Members of Parliament ==
This riding elected the following members of Parliament:

Parliament	Years	Member	Party
Regina—Lake Centre; Riding established from Humboldt—Melfort, Moose Jaw—Lake Centre, Qu'Appelle, Regina City, Rosetown—Biggar, Rosthern and Yorkton
28th	1968–1972	Les Benjamin	New Democratic
29th	1972–1974	Les Benjamin	New Democratic
30th	1974–1979	Les Benjamin	New Democratic
Riding dissolved into Humboldt—Lake Centre, Moose Jaw and Regina West

== Election results ==
1968 Canadian federal election
Party	Candidate	Votes
New Democratic	BENJAMIN, Les	17,102
Progressive Conservative	MORE, Ken	13,572
Liberal	ACKERMAN, Tom	13,104

1972 Canadian federal election
Party	Candidate	Votes
New Democratic	BENJAMIN, Les	18,983
Progressive Conservative	RICHARDSON, George	16,392
Liberal	HOWLAND, Tom	11,429
Social Credit	ADAM, Dal	1,134

1974 Canadian federal election
Party	Candidate	Votes
New Democratic	BENJAMIN, Les	16,874
Progressive Conservative	RICHARDSON, George	15,558
Liberal	BOUCHARD, Dave	14,341
Social Credit	WAGNER, Ewald K.	387
Marxist–Leninist	WALDMAN, Diane Lynne	142

== See also ==
- List of Canadian electoral districts
- Historical federal electoral districts of Canada
