= Les Benjamin =

Canadian politician

Member of Parliament
- In office 1968–1979
- Preceded by: first member
- Succeeded by: riding dissolved
- Constituency: Regina—Lake Centre
- In office 1979–1988
- Preceded by: first member
- Succeeded by: riding dissolved
- Constituency: Regina West
- In office 1988–1993
- Preceded by: first member
- Succeeded by: John Solomon
- Constituency: Regina—Lumsden

Personal details
- Born: Leslie Gordon Benjamin; April 29, 1925 Medicine Hat, Alberta
- Died: June 16, 2003 (aged 78) Regina, Saskatchewan
- Party: New Democratic Party
- Spouse: Constance E. Friesen
- Profession: Manager, railway station agent, secretary, telegrapher

Leslie Gordon "Les" Benjamin (April 29, 1925 – June 16, 2003) was a Canadian politician who served in the House of Commons of Canada. Benjamin was first elected to the House of Commons in 1968 as a New Democratic Party MP from Saskatchewan. In parliament, as the NDP's Transport critic, he often clashed with Otto Lang over the Crow Rate that allowed subsidized rail transport for prairie farmers and was an opponent of deregulation. He retired from parliament in 1993.

When Ronald Reagan addressed the Parliament of Canada in 1987, Benjamin heckled him by crying "he's mad!".

Benjamin was of Welsh heritage with his father's family coming to Canada from the Rumney Valley.

Prior to entering politics, Benjamin worked variously as a railway station agent, telegrapher and secretary.
