= 32nd Canadian Parliament =

1980-84 seating of the national legislature of the North American country

- Majority parliament
- Apr. 14, 1980 – Jul. 9, 1984

Parliament leaders
- Prime minister: Pierre Trudeau; Mar. 3, 1980 – Jun. 30, 1984
- John Turner; Jun. 30, 1984 – Sep. 17, 1984
- Cabinets: 22nd Canadian Ministry; 23rd Canadian Ministry
- Leader of the Opposition: Joe Clark; March 3, 1980 – February 1, 1983
- Erik Nielsen (interim); February 2, 1983 – August 28, 1983
- Brian Mulroney; August 29, 1983 – September 16, 1984

Party caucuses
- Government: Liberal Party
- Opposition: Progressive Conservative Party
- Recognized: New Democratic Party
- Unrecognized: Social Credit Party*
- * Only in the Senate.

House of Commons
- Seating arrangements of the House of Commons
- Speaker of the Commons: Jeanne Sauvé; April 14, 1980 – January 15, 1984
- Lloyd Francis; January 16, 1984 – November 4, 1984
- John Bosley; November 5, 1984 – September 29, 1986
- John Allen Fraser; September 30, 1986 – January 16, 1994
- Government House leader: Yvon Pinard; March 3, 1980 – June 29, 1984
- André Ouellet; June 30, 1984 – July 9, 1984
- Opposition House leader: Walter Baker; April 14, 1980 – September 8, 1981
- Erik Nielsen; September 9, 1981 – February 8, 1983
- Doug Lewis; February 9, 1983 – September 6, 1983
- Erik Nielsen (2nd time); September 7, 1983 – April 5, 1984
- Ray Hnatyshyn; April 6, 1984 – July 9, 1984
- Members: 282 MP seats List of members

Senate
- Seating arrangements of the Senate
- Speaker of the Senate: Jean Marchand; March 4, 1980 – December 15, 1983
- Maurice Riel; December 16, 1983 – November 1, 1984
- Government Senate leader: Ray Perrault; March 3, 1980 – September 29, 1982
- Bud Olson; September 30, 1982 – June 29, 1984
- Allan MacEachen; June 30, 1984 – September 16, 1984
- Opposition Senate leader: Jacques Flynn; January 1, 1980 – January 1, 1984
- Senators: 104 senator seats List of senators

Sovereign
- Monarch: Elizabeth II; 6 February 1952 – 8 September 2022
- Governor general: Edward Schreyer; 22 January 1979 – 14 May 1984
- Jeanne Sauvé; 14 May 1984 – 29 January 1990

Sessions
- 1st session April 14, 1980 – November 30, 1983
- 2nd session December 7, 1983 – July 9, 1984
← 31st	→ 33rd

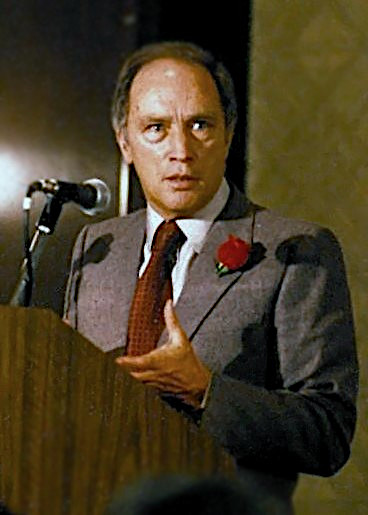
Pierre Trudeau (pictured here in 1980) was Prime Minister during most of the 32nd Canadian Parliament.

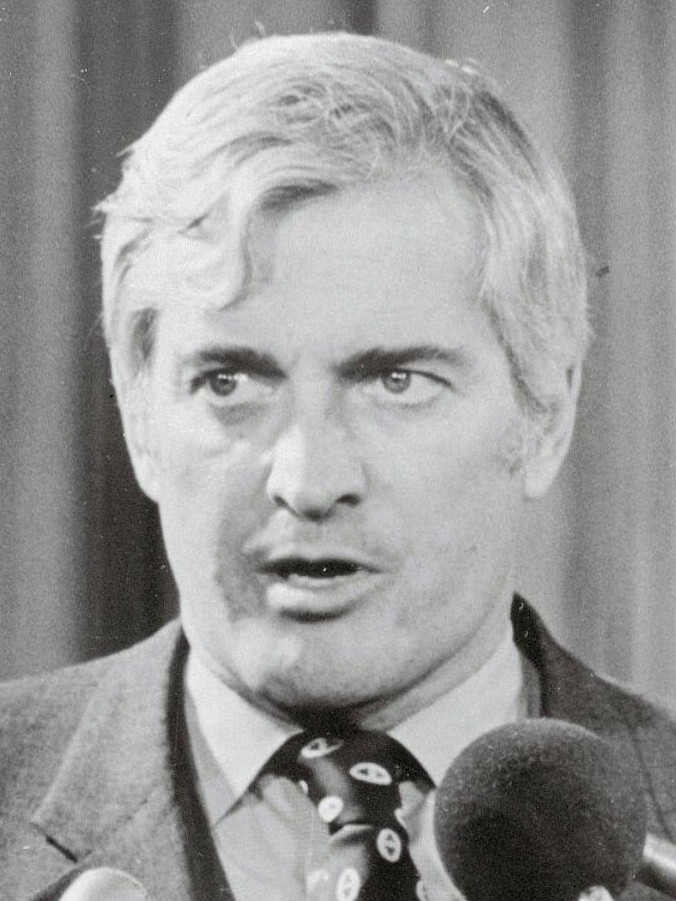
John Turner was Prime Minister during the final weeks of the 32nd Canadian Parliament.

The 32nd Canadian Parliament was in session from April 14, 1980, until July 9, 1984. The membership was set by the 1980 federal election on February 18, 1980, and it only changed slightly due to resignations and by-elections prior to being dissolved before the 1984 election.

There were two sessions of the 32nd Parliament:

Session	Start	End
1st	April 14, 1980	November 30, 1983
2nd	December 7, 1983	July 9, 1984

== Overview ==
It was controlled by a Liberal Party majority, led first by Prime Minister Pierre Trudeau and the 22nd Canadian Ministry, and then by Prime Minister John Turner and the 23rd Canadian Ministry. The Official Opposition was the Progressive Conservative Party, led first by Joe Clark, and then Brian Mulroney.

== Party standings ==
The party standings as of the election and as of dissolution were as follows:

Affiliation	House members		Senate members	
Affiliation	1980 election results	At dissolution	On election day 1980	At dissolution
Liberal	147	135	71	74
Progressive Conservative	103	100	27	23
New Democratic	32	31	0	0
Independent	0	1	2	4
Independent Liberal	0	0	1	1
Social Credit	0	0	1	0
Total members	282	267	102	92
Vacant	0	15	2	2
Total seats	282		104	

* After dissolution but before turning over power, Prime Minister John Turner filled ten of the Senate vacancies with Liberal members, for a total caucus of 74.

== Major events ==
=== Trudeau's resignation ===
On February 29, 1984, a leap day, Pierre Trudeau announced that he would be stepping down as leader of the Liberal Party and as Prime Minister. In his announcement, he said that he had made the decision the day previous after taking a solitary walk in the snow. The phrase "walk in the snow" has since entered the Canadian lexicon, marking an occasion where a consequential career decision is made. John Turner would replace him as leader on June 16, 1984.

=== Patriation of the constitution ===
After many struggles, Canada took ownership of its constitution from Britain. The British parliament passed the Canada Act, 1982 on March 25, 1982. Queen Elizabeth gave her royal assent to the act on March 29, 1982. She subsequently traversed the Atlantic to proclaim the act in Canada on April 17, 1982.

The act was made up of two parts, "Schedule A" enacted the Constitution Act, 1982 into law in Canada and terminated Britain's power to make laws for Canada.

The Constitution Act, 1982 was made up of seven parts: the Charter of Rights and Freedoms (section I), Rights of Aboriginal Peoples of Canada (section II), Equalization and Regional Disparities (section III), Constitutional Conferences (part IV), Procedure for Amending Constitution of Canada (Part V), Amendment to the Constitution Act, 1867 (Part VI), and General (Part VI).

== Ministry ==
The 22nd Canadian Ministry lasted for the nearly all of the 32nd Canadian Parliament. The 23rd Canadian Ministry began near the end of 32nd Canadian Parliament, and lasted until its end.

== Officeholders ==
=== Head of State ===
Office	Photo	Name	Assumed office	Left office
Sovereign		Elizabeth II	February 6, 1952	September 8, 2022
Governor General		Edward Schreyer	January 22, 1979	May 14,1984
Governor General		Jeanne Sauvé	May 14,1984	January 29, 1990

=== Party leadership ===
Party	Photo	Name	Assumed Office	Left Office
Liberal		Pierre Trudeau	April 6, 1968	June 16, 1984
Liberal		John Turner	June 16, 1984	June 23, 1990
Progressive Conservative		Joe Clark	February 22, 1976	February 19, 1983
Progressive Conservative		Erik Nielsen	February 19, 1983	June 11, 1983
Progressive Conservative		Brian Mulroney	June 11, 1983	June 13, 1993
New Democratic		Ed Broadbent	July 7, 1975	December 5, 1989

=== House of Commons ===
==== Presiding officer ====
Party	Photo	Name	Riding	Assumed Office	Left Office	Party
Speaker of the House of Commons		Jeanne Sauvé	Stormont—Dundas	April 14, 1980	January 15, 1984	Liberal
Speaker of the House of Commons		Lloyd Francis	Ottawa West	January 16, 1984	November 4, 1984	Liberal

==== Government leadership (Liberal) ====
Office	Photo	Officer	Riding	Assumed Office	Left Office
Prime Minister		Pierre Trudeau	Mount Royal	April 6, 1968	June 16, 1984
Prime Minister		John Turner	Vancouver Quadra	June 16, 1984	September 17, 1984
House Leader		Yvon Pinard	Drummond	March 3, 1980	June 29, 1984
House Leader		André Ouellet	Papineau	June 30, 1984	July 9, 1984
Whip		Charles Turner	London East	1980	1984

== Parliamentarians ==
=== House of Commons ===
Members of the House of Commons in the 32nd parliament arranged by province.

Key:

- Party leaders are italicized.
- Parliamentary secretaries is indicated by "‡".
- Cabinet ministers are in **boldface**.
- The Prime Minister is **both**.
- The Speaker is indicated by "(†)".

==== Alberta ====
Riding	Member	Political party	First elected / previously elected	No. of terms
Athabasca	Jack Shields	Progressive Conservative	1980	1st term
Bow River	Gordon Taylor	Progressive Conservative	1979	2nd term
Calgary Centre	Harvie Andre	Progressive Conservative	1972	4th term
Calgary East	John Kushner*	Progressive Conservative	1979	2nd term
Calgary North	Frederick Wright	Progressive Conservative	1980	1st term
Calgary South	John Thomson	Progressive Conservative	1979	2nd term
Calgary West	Jim Hawkes	Progressive Conservative	1979	2nd term
Crowfoot	Arnold Malone	Progressive Conservative	1974	3rd term
Edmonton East	William Yurko	Progressive Conservative	1979	2nd term
Edmonton East	William Yurko	Independent**	1979	2nd term
Edmonton North	Steve Paproski	Progressive Conservative	1968	5th term
Edmonton South	Douglas Roche	Progressive Conservative	1972	4th term
Edmonton West	Marcel Lambert	Progressive Conservative	1957	10th term
Edmonton—Strathcona	David Kilgour	Progressive Conservative	1979	2nd term
Lethbridge—Foothills	Blaine Thacker	Progressive Conservative	1979	2nd term
Medicine Hat	Bert Hargrave	Progressive Conservative	1972	4th term
Peace River	Albert Cooper	Progressive Conservative	1980	1st term
Pembina	Peter Elzinga	Progressive Conservative	1974	3rd term
Red Deer	Gordon Towers	Progressive Conservative	1972	4th term
Vegreville	Don Mazankowski	Progressive Conservative	1968	5th term
Wetaskiwin	Kenneth Schellenberger	Progressive Conservative	1972	4th term
Yellowhead	Joe Clark	Progressive Conservative	1972	4th term

* John Kushner died in office on March 2, 1984 and the seat remains vacant for the reminder of parliament
** William Yurko resigned from the Progressive Conservative Party on January 29, 1982 and sat as an independent for the reminder of parliament.

==== British Columbia ====
Riding	Member	Political party	First elected / previously elected	No. of terms
Burnaby	Svend Robinson	New Democrat	1979	2nd term
Capilano	Ron Huntington	Progressive Conservative	1974	3rd term
Cariboo—Chilcotin	Lorne Greenaway	Progressive Conservative	1979	2nd term
Comox—Powell River	Ray Skelly	New Democrat	1979	2nd term
Cowichan—Malahat—The Islands	James Manly	New Democrat	1980	1st term
Esquimalt—Saanich	Donald Munro	Progressive Conservative	1972	4th term
Fraser Valley East	Alexander Patterson	Progressive Conservative	1953, (Note: First elected as a Social Credit) 1962, (Note: Re-elected as a Social Credit) 1972	9th term*
Fraser Valley West	Robert Wenman	Progressive Conservative	1974	3rd term
Kamloops—Shuswap	Nelson Riis	New Democrat	1980	1st term
Kootenay East—Revelstoke	Sid Parker	New Democrat	1980	1st term
Kootenay West	Lyle Kristiansen	New Democrat	1980	1st term
Mission—Port Moody	Mark Rose	New Democrat	1968, (Note: Fraser Valley West) 1979	4th term*
Mission—Port Moody	Gerry St. Germain (1983)*	Progressive Conservative	1983	1st term
Nanaimo—Alberni	Edward Miller	New Democrat	1979	2nd term
New Westminster—Coquitlam	Pauline Jewett	New Democrat	1963, (Note: Northumberland (Ontario) (First elected as a Liberal)) 1979	3rd term*
North Vancouver—Burnaby	Chuck Cook	Progressive Conservative	1979	2nd term
Okanagan North	Vincent Dantzer	Progressive Conservative	1980	1st term
Okanagan—Similkameen	Frederick King	Progressive Conservative	1979	2nd term
Prince George—Bulkley Valley	Robert McCuish	Progressive Conservative	1979	2nd term
Prince George—Peace River	Frank Oberle Sr.	Progressive Conservative	1972	4th term
Richmond—South Delta	Tom Siddon	Progressive Conservative	1978	3rd term
Skeena	James Fulton	New Democrat	1979	2nd term
Surrey—White Rock—North Delta	Benno Friesen	Progressive Conservative	1974	3rd term
Vancouver Centre	Pat Carney	Progressive Conservative	1980	1st term
Vancouver East	Margaret Mitchell	New Democrat	1979	2nd term
Vancouver Kingsway	Ian Waddell	New Democrat	1979	2nd term
Vancouver Quadra	Bill Clarke	Progressive Conservative	1972	4th term
Vancouver South	John Allen Fraser	Progressive Conservative	1972	4th term
Victoria	Allan McKinnon	Progressive Conservative	1972	4th term

* Mark Rose left Parliament and was replaced by Gerry St. Germain in an August 29, 1983, by-election

==== Manitoba ====
Riding	Member	Political party	First elected / previously elected	No. of terms
Brandon—Souris	Walter Dinsdale	Progressive Conservative	1951	12th term
Brandon—Souris	Lee Clark (1983)*	Progressive Conservative	1983	1st term
Churchill	Rodney Murphy	New Democrat	1979	2nd term
Dauphin	Laverne Lewycky	New Democrat	1980	1st term
Lisgar	Jack Murta	Progressive Conservative	1970	5th term
Portage—Marquette	Charles Mayer	Progressive Conservative	1979	2nd term
Provencher	Jake Epp	Progressive Conservative	1972	4th term
Selkirk—Interlake	Terry Sargeant	New Democrat	1979	2nd term
St. Boniface	Robert Bockstael ‡	Liberal	1979	2nd term
Winnipeg North	David Orlikow	New Democrat	1962	8th term
Winnipeg North Centre	Stanley Knowles	New Democrat	1942, 1962	13th term*
Winnipeg—Assiniboine	Dan McKenzie	Progressive Conservative	1972	4th term
Winnipeg—Birds Hill	Bill Blaikie	New Democrat	1979	2nd term
Winnipeg—Fort Garry	**Lloyd Axworthy**	Liberal	1979	2nd term
Winnipeg—St. James	Cyril Keeper	New Democrat	1980	1st term

* Walter Dinsdale died in office and was replaced by Lee Clark in a May 24, 1983, by-election

==== New Brunswick ====
Riding	Member	Political party	First elected / previously elected	No. of terms
Carleton—Charlotte	Fred McCain	Progressive Conservative	1972	4th term
Fundy—Royal	Robert Corbett	Progressive Conservative	1978	3rd term
Gloucester	**Herb Breau**	Liberal	1968	5th term
Madawaska—Victoria	Eymard Corbin	Liberal	1968	5th term
Moncton	Gary McCauley ‡	Liberal	1979	2nd term
Northumberland—Miramichi	Maurice Dionne	Liberal	1974	3rd term
Restigouche	Maurice Harquail ‡	Liberal	1975	3rd term
Saint John	Mike Landers	Liberal	1974, 1980	2nd term*
Westmorland—Kent	**Roméo LeBlanc**	Liberal	1972	4th term
York—Sunbury	J. Robert Howie	Progressive Conservative	1972	4th term

==== Newfoundland ====
Riding	Member	Political party	First elected / previously elected	No. of terms
Bonavista—Trinity—Conception	Dave Rooney	Liberal	1972	4th term
Burin—St. George's	**Roger Simmons** ‡	Liberal	1979	2nd term
Gander—Twillingate	George Baker	Liberal	1974	3rd term
Grand Falls—White Bay—Labrador	**Bill Rompkey**	Liberal	1972	4th term
Humber—Port au Port—St. Barbe	Brian Tobin ‡	Liberal	1980	1st term
St. John's East	James McGrath	Progressive Conservative	1957, 1968	8th term*
St. John's West	John Crosbie	Progressive Conservative	1976	3rd term

==== Nova Scotia ====
Riding	Member	Political party	First elected / previously elected	No. of terms
Annapolis Valley—Hants	Pat Nowlan	Progressive Conservative	1965	6th term
Cape Breton Highlands—Canso	**Allan MacEachen**	Liberal	1953, 1962	10th term*
Cape Breton—East Richmond	David Dingwall ‡	Liberal	1980	1st term
Cape Breton—The Sydneys	Russell MacLellan ‡	Liberal	1979	2nd term
Central Nova	Elmer MacKay	Progressive Conservative	1971	5th term
Central Nova	Brian Mulroney (1983)*	Progressive Conservative	1983	1st term
Cumberland—Colchester	Robert Coates	Progressive Conservative	1957	10th term
Dartmouth—Halifax East	Michael Forrestall	Progressive Conservative	1965	6th term
Halifax	**Gerald Regan**	Liberal	1963, 1980	2nd term*
Halifax West	Howard Crosby	Progressive Conservative	1978	3rd term
South Shore	Lloyd Crouse	Progressive Conservative	1957	10th term
South Western Nova	Coline Campbell	Liberal	1974, 1980	2nd term*

* Elmer MacKay resigned his seat to give new Tory leader Brian Mulroney a place in the Commons after an August 29, 1983 by-election.

==== Ontario ====
Riding	Member	Political party	First elected / previously elected	No. of terms
Algoma	Maurice Foster ‡	Liberal	1968	5th term
Beaches	Neil Young	New Democrat	1980	1st term
Brampton—Georgetown	John McDermid	Progressive Conservative	1979	2nd term
Brant	Derek Blackburn	New Democrat	1971	5th term
Broadview—Greenwood	Bob Rae	New Democrat	1978	3rd term
Broadview—Greenwood	Lynn McDonald (1982)*	New Democrat	1982	1st term
Bruce—Grey	Gary Gurbin	Progressive Conservative	1979	2nd term
Bruce—Grey	Gary Gurbin	Independent Progressive Conservative**	1979	2nd term
Bruce—Grey	Gary Gurbin	Progressive Conservative	1979	2nd term
Burlington	Bill Kempling	Progressive Conservative	1972	4th term
Cambridge	Chris Speyer	Progressive Conservative	1979	2nd term
Cochrane	Keith Penner	Liberal	1968	5th term
Davenport	**Charles Caccia**	Liberal	1968	5th term
Don Valley East	**David Smith** ‡	Liberal	1980	1st term
Don Valley West	John Bosley	Progressive Conservative	1979	2nd term
Durham—Northumberland	Allan Lawrence	Progressive Conservative	1972	4th term
Eglinton—Lawrence	Roland de Corneille ‡	Liberal	1979	2nd term
Elgin	John Wise	Progressive Conservative	1972	4th term
Erie	Girve Fretz	Progressive Conservative	1979	2nd term
Essex—Kent	Robert Daudlin ‡	Liberal	1974	3rd term
Essex—Windsor	**Eugene Whelan**	Liberal	1962	8th term
Etobicoke Centre	Michael Wilson	Progressive Conservative	1979	2nd term
Etobicoke North	**Roy MacLaren** ‡	Liberal	1979	2nd term
Etobicoke—Lakeshore	Ken Robinson ‡	Liberal	1968, 1974	4th term*
Glengarry—Prescott—Russell	Denis Éthier ‡	Liberal	1972	4th term
Grey—Simcoe	Gus Mitges	Progressive Conservative	1972	4th term
Guelph	James Schroder ‡	Liberal	1980	1st term
Haldimand—Norfolk	Bud Bradley	Progressive Conservative	1979	2nd term
Halton	Otto Jelinek	Progressive Conservative	1972	4th term
Hamilton East	**John Munro**	Liberal	1962	8th term
Hamilton Mountain	Ian Deans	New Democrat	1980	1st term
Hamilton—Wentworth	Geoffrey Scott	Progressive Conservative	1978	3rd term
Hamilton West	Lincoln Alexander	Progressive Conservative	1968	5th term
Hamilton West	Stanley Hudecki (1980)*** ‡	Liberal	1980	1st term
Hastings—Frontenac	Bill Vankoughnet	Progressive Conservative	1979	2nd term
Huron—Bruce	Murray Cardiff	Progressive Conservative	1980	1st term
Kenora—Rainy River	John Mercer Reid	Liberal	1965	6th term
Kent	Maurice Bossy ‡	Liberal	1980	1st term
Kingston and the Islands	Flora MacDonald	Progressive Conservative	1972	4th term
Kitchener	Peter Lang ‡	Liberal	1980	1st term
Lambton—Middlesex	**Ralph Ferguson** ‡	Liberal	1980	1st term
Lanark—Renfrew—Carleton	Paul Dick	Progressive Conservative	1972	4th term
Leeds—Grenville	Thomas Cossitt	Progressive Conservative	1972	4th term
Leeds—Grenville	Jennifer Cossitt (1982)****	Progressive Conservative	1982	1st term
Lincoln	Bryce Mackasey	Liberal	1962, (Note: Verdun (Quebec)) 1980	7th term*
London East	Charles Turner	Liberal	1968	5th term
London West	Judd Buchanan	Liberal	1968	5th term
London West	Jack Burghardt (1981)† ‡	Liberal	1981	1st term
London—Middlesex	Garnet Bloomfield ‡	Liberal	1980	1st term
Mississauga North	Douglas Fisher ‡	Liberal	1980	1st term
Mississauga South	Don Blenkarn	Progressive Conservative	1972, 1979	3rd term*
Nepean—Carleton	Walter Baker ††	Progressive Conservative	1972	4th term
Niagara Falls	Al MacBain ‡	Liberal	1980	1st term
Nickel Belt	**Judy Erola**	Liberal	1980	1st term
Nipissing	**Jean-Jacques Blais**	Liberal	1972	4th term
Northumberland	George Hees	Progressive Conservative	1950, (Note: Broadview) 1965	11th term*
Ontario	Thomas Fennell	Progressive Conservative	1979	2nd term
Oshawa	Ed Broadbent	New Democrat	1968	5th term
Ottawa—Carleton	**Jean-Luc Pépin**	Liberal	1963, (Note: Drummond—Arthabaska/Drummond (Quebec)) 1979	5th term*
Ottawa Centre	John Evans ‡	Liberal	1979	2nd term
Ottawa West	Cyril Lloyd Francis (†)	Liberal	1963, (Note: Carleton) 1968, 1974, 1980	4th term*
Ottawa—Vanier	Jean-Robert Gauthier	Liberal	1972	4th term
Oxford	Bruce Halliday	Progressive Conservative	1974	3rd term
Parkdale—High Park	Jesse Flis ‡	Liberal	1979	2nd term
Parry Sound-Muskoka	Stan Darling	Progressive Conservative	1972	4th term
Perth	William Jarvis	Progressive Conservative	1972	4th term
Peterborough	Bill Domm	Progressive Conservative	1979	2nd term
Prince Edward—Hastings	Jack Ellis	Progressive Conservative	1972	4th term
Renfrew—Nipissing—Pembroke	Len Hopkins ‡	Liberal	1965	6th term
Rosedale	David Crombie	Progressive Conservative	1978	3rd term
Sarnia	Bud Cullen	Liberal	1968, 1980	4th term*
Sault Ste. Marie	Ron Irwin ‡	Liberal	1980	1st term
Scarborough Centre	Norm Kelly ‡	Liberal	1980	1st term
Scarborough East	Gordon Gilchrist	Progressive Conservative	1979	2nd term
Scarborough West	David Weatherhead ‡	Liberal	1968, 1980	2nd term*
Simcoe North	Doug Lewis	Progressive Conservative	1979	2nd term
Simcoe South	Ronald Stewart	Progressive Conservative	1979	2nd term
Spadina	Peter Stollery ‡	Liberal	1972	4th term
Spadina	Dan Heap (1981)†††	New Democrat	1981	1st term
St. Catharines	Joseph Reid	Progressive Conservative	1979	2nd term
St. Paul's	**John Roberts**	Liberal	1968, (Note: York—Simcoe) 1974, 1980	3rd term*
Stormont—Dundas	**Ed Lumley**	Liberal	1974	3rd term
Sudbury	**Doug Frith** ‡	Liberal	1980	1st term
Thunder Bay—Atikokan	Paul McRae	Liberal	1972	4th term
Thunder Bay—Nipigon	Jack Masters ‡	Liberal	1980	1st term
Timiskaming	Bruce Lonsdale	Liberal	1980	1st term
Timiskaming	John MacDougall (1982)††††	Progressive Conservative	1982	1st term
Timmins—Chapleau	Ray Chénier ‡	Liberal	1979	2nd term
Trinity	Aideen Nicholson ‡	Liberal	1974	3rd term
Victoria—Haliburton	William C. Scott	Progressive Conservative	1965	6th term
Waterloo	Walter McLean	Progressive Conservative	1979	2nd term
Welland	Gilbert Parent ‡	Liberal	1974	3rd term
Wellington—Dufferin—Simcoe	Perrin Beatty	Progressive Conservative	1972	4th term
Willowdale	Jim Peterson ‡	Liberal	1980	1st term
Windsor West	**Herb Gray**	Liberal	1962	8th term
Windsor—Walkerville	**Mark MacGuigan**	Liberal	1968	5th term
York Centre	**Bob Kaplan**	Liberal	1968, (Note: Don Valley) 1974	4th term*
York East	**David Collenette** ‡	Liberal	1974, 1980	2nd term*
York North	John A. Gamble	Progressive Conservative	1979	2nd term
York—Scarborough	**Paul Cosgrove**	Liberal	1980	1st term
York South—Weston	Ursula Appolloni ‡	Liberal	1974	3rd term
York—Peel	Sinclair Stevens	Progressive Conservative	1972	4th term
York West	**James Fleming**	Liberal	1972	4th term

* Bob Rae left parliament to become leader of the Ontario NDP and was replaced by Lynn McDonald in 1982.
** Gary Gurbin resigned from the Progressive Conservative Party on December 17, 1981, citing concerns over party leader Joe Clark sat as an Independent Progressive Conservative until rejoining the party on January 28, 1982.
*** Lincoln Alexander left parliament to become head of the Worker's Compensation Board and was replaced by Stanley Hudecki in a 1980 by-election.
**** Thomas Cossitt died in office and was replaced by Jennifer Cossitt in a 1982 by-election
† Judd Buchanan resigned from parliament and was replaced by Jack Burghardt in an April 13, 1981, by-election
†† Walter Baker died in office on November 13, 1983 and the seat remains vacant for the reminder of parliament
††† Peter Stollery was appointed to the Senate and was replaced by Dan Heap in an August 17, 1981, by-election
†††† Bruce Lonsdale died in office and was replaced by John MacDougall in an October 12, 1982, by-election.

==== Prince Edward Island ====
Riding	Member	Political party	First elected / previously elected	No. of terms
Cardigan	**Daniel J. MacDonald**	Liberal	1972, 1980	3rd term*
Cardigan	**Bennett Campbell** (1981)*	Liberal	1981	1st term
Egmont	George Henderson ‡	Liberal	1980	1st term
Hillsborough	Thomas McMillan	Progressive Conservative	1979	2nd term
Malpeque	Melbourne Gass	Progressive Conservative	1979	2nd term

* Daniel J. MacDonald died in office on September 30, 1980 and was replaced by Bennett Campbell in an April 13, 1981, by-election.

==== Quebec ====
Riding	Member	Political party	First elected / previously elected	No. of terms
Abitibi	René Gingras ‡	Liberal	1980	1st term
Argenteuil	Robert Gourd ‡	Liberal	1979	2nd term
Beauce	Normand Lapointe ‡	Liberal	1980	1st term
Beauharnois–Salaberry	Gérald Laniel ‡	Liberal	1962	8th term
Bellechasse	Alain Garant ‡	Liberal	1980	1st term
Berthier–Maskinongé	Antonio Yanakis ‡	Liberal	1965	6th term
Blainville–Deux-Montagnes	**Francis Fox**	Liberal	1972	4th term
Bonaventure–Îles-de-la-Madeleine	**Rémi Bujold** ‡	Liberal	1979	2nd term
Bourassa	Carlo Rossi ‡	Liberal	1979	2nd term
Chambly	Raymond Dupont ‡	Liberal	1972	4th term
Champlain	Michel Veillette ‡	Liberal	1979	2nd term
Charlesbourg	**Pierre Bussières**	Liberal	1974	3rd term
Charlevoix	**Charles Lapointe**	Liberal	1974	3rd term
Châteauguay	Ian Watson	Liberal	1963	7th term
Chicoutimi	Marcel Dionne ‡	Liberal	1979	2nd term
Dollard	Louis Desmarais ‡	Liberal	1979	2nd term
Drummond	**Yvon Pinard**	Liberal	1974	3rd term
Duvernay	Yves Demers ‡	Liberal	1972	4th term
Frontenac	Léopold Corriveau	Liberal	1970	5th term
Gamelin	Arthur Portelance	Liberal	1968	5th term
Gaspé	Alexandre Cyr	Liberal	1963, 1968	6th term*
Gatineau	René Cousineau ‡	Liberal	1979	2nd term
Hochelaga–Maisonneuve	**Serge Joyal** ‡	Liberal	1974	3rd term
Hull	Gaston Isabelle	Liberal	1965	6th term
Joliette	Roch La Salle*	Progressive Conservative	1968	5th term
Jonquière	Gilles Marceau	Liberal	1968	5th term
Kamouraska—Rivière-du-Loup	Rosaire Gendron	Liberal	1963	7th term
Labelle	Maurice Dupras	Liberal	1970	5th term
Lac-Saint-Jean	Pierre Gimaïel	Liberal	1980	1st term
Lachine	Roderick Blaker ‡	Liberal	1972	4th term
Langelier	**Gilles Lamontagne**	Liberal	1977	3rd term
La Prairie	Pierre Deniger	Liberal	1979	2nd term
Lasalle	John Campbell	Liberal	1972	4th term
Laurier	David Berger ‡	Liberal	1979	2nd term
Laval	Marcel-Claude Roy	Liberal	1968	5th term
Laval-des-Rapides	Jeanne Sauvé (†)	Liberal	1972	4th term
Lévis	Raynald Guay	Liberal	1963	7th term
Lévis	Gaston Gourde (1981)** ‡	Liberal	1981	1st term
Longueuil	**Jacques Olivier**	Liberal	1972	4th term
Lotbiniere	Jean-Guy Dubois ‡	Liberal	1980	1st term
Louis-Hébert	Dennis Dawson ‡	Liberal	1977	3rd term
Manicouagan	André Maltais ‡	Liberal	1979	2nd term
Matapédia–Matane	**Pierre de Bané**	Liberal	1968	5th term
Mégantic–Compton–Stanstead	Claude Tessier ‡	Liberal	1974	3rd term
Mercier	**Céline Hervieux-Payette** ‡	Liberal	1979	2nd term
Missisquoi	André Bachand ‡	Liberal	1980	1st term
Montmorency	Louis Duclos ‡	Liberal	1974	3rd term
Mount Royal	**Pierre Trudeau**	Liberal	1965	6th term
Notre-Dame-de-Grâce	Warren Allmand	Liberal	1965	6th term
Outremont	**Marc Lalonde**	Liberal	1972	4th term
Papineau	**André Ouellet**	Liberal	1967	6th term
Pontiac-Gatineau-Labelle	Thomas Lefebvre	Liberal	1965	6th term
Portneuf	Rolland Dion ‡	Liberal	1979	2nd term
Québec-Est	Gérard Duquet	Liberal	1965	6th term
Richelieu	Jean-Louis Leduc ‡	Liberal	1979	2nd term
Richmond	Alain Tardif ‡	Liberal	1979	2nd term
Rimouski	Eva Côté ‡	Liberal	1980	1st term
Roberval	Suzanne Beauchamp-Niquet ‡	Liberal	1980	1st term
Rosemont	Claude-André Lachance ‡	Liberal	1974	3rd term
Saint-Denis	Marcel Prud'homme	Liberal	1964	7th term
Saint-Henri–Westmount	**Don Johnston**	Liberal	1978	3rd term
Saint-Hyacinthe	Marcel Ostiguy ‡	Liberal	1978	3rd term
Saint-Jacques	Jacques Guilbault	Liberal	1968	5th term
Saint-Jean	Paul-André Massé ‡	Liberal	1979	2nd term
Saint-Léonard–Anjou	**Monique Bégin**	Liberal	1972	4th term
Saint-Maurice	**Jean Chrétien**	Liberal	1963	7th term
Saint-Michel	Marie Thérèse Killens ‡	Liberal	1979	2nd term
Sainte-Marie	Jean-Claude Malépart ‡	Liberal	1979	2nd term
Shefford	**Jean Lapierre** ‡	Liberal	1979	2nd term
Sherbrooke	Irénée Pelletier	Liberal	1972	4th term
Témiscamingue	Henri Tousignant ‡	Liberal	1979	2nd term
Terrebonne	Joseph-Roland Comtois	Liberal	1965	6th term
Trois-Rivières	Claude Lajoie	Liberal	1971	5th term
Vaudreuil	Hal Herbert	Liberal	1972	4th term
Verchères	Bernard Loiselle ‡	Liberal	1974	3rd term
Verdun	Pierre Savard ‡	Liberal	1977	3rd term

* Roch La Salle resigned from parliament on March 17, 1981, to become leader of Quebec's Union Nationale party. After this party suffered a major defeat in the 1981 Quebec election, La Salle resigned as leader and was re-elected to his old position in an August 17 by-election.
** Raynald Guay left parliament on August 29, 1980, and was replaced by Gaston Gourde in a May 4, 1981, by-election.

==== Saskatchewan ====
Riding	Member	Political party	First elected / previously elected	No. of terms
Assiniboia	Lenard Gustafson	Progressive Conservative	1979	2nd term
Humboldt—Lake Centre	Vic Althouse	New Democrat	1980	1st term
Kindersley—Lloydminster	Bill McKnight	Progressive Conservative	1979	2nd term
Mackenzie	Stanley Korchinski	Progressive Conservative	1958	9th term
Moose Jaw	Douglas Neil	Progressive Conservative	1972	4th term
Prince Albert	Stan Hovdebo	New Democrat	1979	2nd term
Qu'Appelle—Moose Mountain	Alvin Hamilton	Progressive Conservative	1957, (Note: Qu'Appelle) 1972	9th term*
Regina East	Simon De Jong	New Democrat	1979	2nd term
Regina West	Les Benjamin	New Democrat	1968	5th term
Saskatoon East	Robert Ogle	New Democrat	1979	2nd term
Saskatoon West	Ray Hnatyshyn	Progressive Conservative	1974	3rd term
Swift Current—Maple Creek	Frank Hamilton	Progressive Conservative	1972	4th term
The Battlefords—Meadow Lake	Douglas Anguish	New Democrat	1980	1st term
Yorkton—Melville	Lorne Nystrom	New Democrat	1968	5th term

==== Territories ====
Riding	Member	Political party	First elected / previously elected	No. of terms
Nunatsiaq	Peter Ittinuar*	New Democrat	1979	2nd term
Nunatsiaq	Peter Ittinuar*	Liberal	1979	2nd term
Nunatsiaq	Peter Ittinuar*	Independent	1979	2nd term
Western Arctic	Dave Nickerson	Progressive Conservative	1979	2nd term
Yukon	Erik Nielsen	Progressive Conservative	1957	10th term

* Peter Ittinuar resigned from the New Democratic Party on November 26, 1982 to join the Liberal Party and he was suspended from the Liberals to sat as an independent for the reminder of parliament following charges of breach of trust, theft and forgery, of which he would ultimately be acquitted.

== Changes to party standings ==
=== By-elections ===
By-election	Date	Incumbent	Party	Winner	Party	Cause	Retained
Mission—Port Moody	August 29, 1983	Mark Rose	New Democratic	Gerry St. Germain	Progressive Conservative	Resignation	No
Central Nova	August 29, 1983	Elmer M. MacKay	Progressive Conservative	Brian Mulroney	Progressive Conservative	Resignation to provide a seat for Mulroney	Yes
Brandon—Souris	May 24, 1983	Walter Dinsdale	Progressive Conservative	Lee Clark	Progressive Conservative	Death (kidney failure)	Yes
Broadview—Greenwood	October 12, 1982	Bob Rae	New Democratic	Lynn McDonald	New Democratic	Resigned to become leader of New Democratic Party of Ontario	Yes
Leeds—Grenville	October 12, 1982	Tom Cossitt	Progressive Conservative	Jennifer Cossitt	Progressive Conservative	Death (heart attack)	Yes
Timiskaming	October 12, 1982	Bruce Lonsdale	Liberal	John A. MacDougall	Progressive Conservative	Death (car accident)	No
Spadina	August 17, 1981	Peter Stollery	Liberal	Dan Heap	New Democratic	Called to the Senate	No
Joliette	August 17, 1981	Roch La Salle	Progressive Conservative	Roch La Salle	Progressive Conservative	Resignation to contest the 1981 Quebec election	Yes
Lévis	May 4, 1981	Raynald Guay	Liberal	Gaston Gourde	Liberal	Resignation	Yes
London West	April 13, 1981	Judd Buchanan	Liberal	Jack Burghardt	Liberal	Resignation	Yes
Cardigan	April 13, 1981	Daniel J. MacDonald	Liberal	W. Bennett Campbell	Liberal	Death	Yes
Hamilton West	September 8, 1980	Lincoln Alexander	Progressive Conservative	Stan Hudecki	Liberal	Resignation	No

== Legislation and motions ==
=== Act's which received royal assent under 32nd Parliament ===
==== 1st Session ====
===== Public acts =====
Date of Assent	Index	Title	Bill Number
May 7, 1980	1	Immigration Act, 1976, An Act to amend the	C-2
May 7, 1980	2	Canada-France Trade Agreement Act, 1933 and The Supplementary Canada-France Trade Agreement Act, 1935, An Act to repeal The	S-5
May 16, 1980	3	Appropriation Act No. 1, 1980–81	C-29
June 5, 1980	4	Old Age Security Act, An Act to amend the	C-16
June 27, 1980	5	National Anthem Act	C-36
June 27, 1980	6	Small Businesses Loans Act, An Act to amend the	C-17
June 27, 1980	7	Farm Improvement Loans Act, An Act to amend the	C-27
November 26, 1980	40	Banks and Banking Law Revision Act, 1980	C-6
December 11, 1980	41	Appropriation Act No. 2, 1980–81	C-47
December 11, 1980	42	Appropriation Act No. 3, 1980–81	C-49
December 17, 1980	43	Small Loans Act and to provide for its repeal and to amend the Criminal Code, An Act to amend the	C-44
December 17, 1980	44	Canada and Spain, Canada and the Republic of Austria, Canada and Italy, Canada and the Republic of Korea, Canada and the Socialist Republic of Romania and Canada and the Republic of Indonesia and agreements between Canada and Malaysia, Canada and Jamaica and Canada and Barbados and a convention between Canada and the United Kingdom of Great Britain and Northern Ireland for the avoidance of double taxation with respect to income tax, An Act to implement conventions between	S-2
December 17, 1980	45	Clean Air Act, An Act to amend the	C-51
February 19, 1981	46	Fiscal transfers to the provinces, An Act to amend laws relating to	C-24
February 19, 1981	47	Miscellaneous Statute Law Amendment Act, 1981	C-56
February 26, 1981	48	Income Tax, An Act to amend the statute law relating to	C-54
March 18, 1981	49	Canada Student Loans Act, An Act to amend the	C-55
March 18, 1981	50	Judges Act and certain other Acts in consequence thereof, An Act to amend the	C-34
March 31, 1981	51	Appropriation Act No. 4, 1980–81	C-62
March 31, 1981	52	Appropriation Act No. 1, 1981–82	C-63
April 8, 1981	53	Borrowing Authority Act, 1981–82	C-59
April 23, 1981	54	Canada Post Corporation Act	C-42
April 23, 1981	55	Auditor General Act, An Act to amend the	C-64
April 23, 1981	56	Canada and New Zealand and Canada and Australia for the avoidance of double taxation with respect to income tax, An Act to implement conventions between	S-17
June 30, 1981	57	Canadian Home Insulation Program Act	C-75
June 30, 1981	58	Home Insulation (N.S. and P.E.I.) Program Act	C-76
June 30, 1981	59	Oil Substitution and Conservation Act	C-77
June 30, 1981	60	Department of Labour Act, An Act to amend the	S-4
June 30, 1981	61	Prohibition of International Air Services Act	S-7
June 30, 1981	62	Canadian and British Insurance Companies Act, An Act to amend the	C-66
June 30, 1981	63	Currency and Exchange Act, An Act to amend the	C-68
June 30, 1981	64	Superannuation Amendment Act, 1981	C-65
June 30, 1981	65	Relocation of government agencies, An Act respecting the	C-13
June 30, 1981	66	Appropriation Act No. 2, 1981–82	C-80
July 8, 1981	67	Customs Tariff and to repeal the Irish Free State Trade Agreement Act, 1932, the Union of South Africa Trade Agreement Act, 1932 and the United Kingdom Trade Agreement Act, 1937, An Act to amend the	C-50
July 8, 1981	68	Excise Tax Act and the Excise Act and to provide for a revenue tax in respect of petroleum and gas, An Act to amend the	C-57
July 8, 1981	69	Animal Disease and Protection Act, An Act to amend the	C-70
July 8, 1981	70	International Development Association Act, An Act to amend the	C-71
July 8, 1981	71	National Housing Act, An Act to amend the	C-72
July 8, 1981	72	Atlantic Region Freight Assistance Act, An Act to amend the	C-73
July 8, 1981	73	International Development (Financial Institutions) Assistance Act	C-74
July 10, 1981	74	Diplomatic and Consular Privileges and Immunities Act, An Act to amend the	C-14
July 10, 1981	75	Official Residences Act, An Act to amend the	C-81
July 10, 1981	76	Pension Act and the Compensation for Former Prisoners of War Act, An Act to amend the	C-82
July 10, 1981	77	Senate and House of Commons Act, the Salaries Act, the Parliamentary Secretaries Act and the Members of Parliament Retiring Allowances Act, An Act to amend the	C-83
July 10, 1981	78	Veterans’ Land Act and to amend the Veterans Benefit Act in consequence thereof, An Act to amend the	C-79
July 10, 1981	79	Corporations and Labour Unions Returns Act, An Act to amend the	S-10
December 18, 1981	80	National Energy Board Act, An Act to amend the	C-60
December 18, 1981	81	Canada Oil and Gas Act	C-48
December 18, 1981	82	Meat Import Act	C-46
December 18, 1981	83	Small Businesses Loans Act (No. 2), An Act to amend the	C-84
December 18, 1981	84	National Energy Board Act (No. 2), An Act to amend the	C-87
December 18, 1981	85	Jules and Paul-Émile Léger Foundation, An Act to incorporate the	S-23
December 18, 1981	86	Appropriation Act No. 3, 1981–82	C-86
March 31, 1982	87	Electricity and Gas Inspection Act	C-11
March 31, 1982	88	Pest Control Products Act, An Act to amend the	C-45
March 31, 1982	89	Labour Adjustment Benefits Act	C-78
March 31, 1982	90	Appropriation Act No. 4, 1981–82	C-99
March 31, 1982	91	Appropriation Act No. 1, 1982–83	C-100
April 7, 1982	92	Loans to farmers, An Act respecting	C-88
April 7, 1982	93	National Housing Act and the Canada Mortgage and Housing Corporation Act, An Act to amend the	C-89
April 7, 1982	94	Federal-Provincial Fiscal Arrangements and Established Programs Financing Act, 1977, An Act to amend the	C-97
June 3, 1982	95	State Immunity Act	S-19
June 3, 1982	96	Canada Elections Act, An Act to amend the	C-58
June 3, 1982	97	Unemployment Insurance Act, 1971 (No. 2), An Act to amend the	C-114
June 17, 1982	98	Borrowing Authority Act, 1982–83	C-111
June 17, 1982	99	Criminal Code, An Act to amend the	C-117
June 22, 1982	100	Garnishment, Attachment and Pension Diversion Act	C-38
June 22, 1982	101	Supplementary Retirement Benefits Act, An Act to amend the	C-120
June 22, 1982	102	Retention of records, An Act to amend certain Acts that provide for the	C-118
June 22, 1982	103	Appropriation Act No. 2, 1982–83	C-121
June 29, 1982	104	Taxes, An Act to amend the statute law relating to certain	C-112
June 29, 1982	105	Petro-Canada Act, An Act to amend the	C-101
June 29, 1982	106	Department of Energy, Mines and Resources Act, An Act to amend the	C-102
June 29, 1982	107	Petroleum Incentives Program Act	C-104
July 7, 1982	108	Cooperative Energy Act	C-116
July 7, 1982	109	National Training Act	C-115
July 7, 1982	110	Young Offenders Act	C-61
July 7, 1982	111	Access to Information Act and the Privacy Act, An Act to enact the	C-43
July 7, 1982	112	Energy Monitoring Act	C-106
July 7, 1982	113	Motor Vehicle Fuel Consumption Standards Act	C-107
July 7, 1982	114	Petroleum Administration Act, An Act to amend the	C-103
July 7, 1982	115	Canada Business Corporations Act, An Act to amend the	C-105
July 7, 1982	116	National Energy Board Act (No. 3), An Act to amend the	C-108
August 4, 1982	117	Railway Act, An Act to amend the	S-29
August 4, 1982	118	Small Businesses Loans Act (No. 3), An Act to amend the	C-122
August 4, 1982	119	Urea Formaldehyde Insulation Act	C-109
August 4, 1982	120	Supplementary Borrowing Authority Act, 1982–83	C-125
August 4, 1982	121	National Harbours Board Act et al., An Act to amend the	C-92
August 4, 1982	122	Public Sector Compensation Restraint Act	C-124
August 4, 1982	123	Financial Administration Act (No. 2), An Act to amend the	C-126
October 27, 1982	124	Holidays Act, An Act to amend the	C-201
October 27, 1982	125	Criminal Code in relation to sexual offences and other offences against the person, An Act to amend the	C-127
November 4, 1982	126	West Coast Ports Operations Act, 1982	C-133
November 8, 1982	127	Supplementary Borrowing Authority Act, 1982-83 (No. 2)	C-128
December 16, 1982	128	Bretton Woods Agreements Act and the International Development Association Act, An Act to amend the	C-129
December 16, 1982	129	Customs Tariff, An Act to amend the	C-90
December 16, 1982	130	National Housing Act (No. 2), An Act to amend the	C-135
December 16, 1982	131	Farm Loans Interest Rebate Act (No. 2)	C-134
December 16, 1982	132	Appropriation Act No. 3, 1982–83	C-140
January 31, 1983	133	Canada Agricultural Products Standards Act, An Act to amend the	C-98
January 31, 1983	134	Mississquoi, An Act to change the name of the electoral district of	C-620
January 31, 1983	135	Saint-Michel, An Act to change the name of the electoral district of	C-647
January 31, 1983	136	Supplementary Retirement Benefits Act (No. 2), An Act to amend the	C-133
February 15, 1983	137	Dauphin, An Act to change the name of the electoral district of	C-672
February 15, 1983	138	Old Age Security Act (No. 2), An Act to amend the	C-131
February 17, 1983	139	Family Allowances Act, 1973, An Act to amend the	C-132
March 30, 1983	140	Income Tax (No. 2), An Act to amend the statute law relating to	C-139
March 30, 1983	141	Small Businesses Loans Act (No. 4), An Act to amend the	C-144
March 30, 1983	142	International Development (Financial Institutions) Continuing Assistance Act	C-130
March 30, 1983	143	Canadian Human Rights Act, An Act to amend the	C-141
March 30, 1983	144	Supplementary Borrowing Authority Act, 1982-83 (No. 3)	C-143
March 30, 1983	145	Appropriation Act No. 4, 1982–83	C-145
March 30, 1983	146	Appropriation Act No. 1, 1983–84	C-146
April 27, 1983	147	Small Business Investment Grants Act	C-136
April 27, 1983	148	Canada Deposit Insurance Corporation Act, An Act to amend the	C-142
June 3, 1983	149	Unemployment Insurance Act, 1971 (No. 3), An Act to amend the	C-156
June 3, 1983	150	Salaries Act, An Act to amend the	C-160
June 29, 1983	151	Borrowing Authority Act, 1983-84 (No. 2)	C-151
June 29, 1983	152	Canagrex Act	C-85
June 29, 1983	153	Farm Improvement Loans Act (No. 2), An Act to amend the	C-148
June 29, 1983	154	Fisheries Improvement Loans Act (No. 2), An Act to amend the	C-147
June 29, 1983	155	Canada Student Loans Act (No. 2), An Act to amend the	C-161
June 29, 1983	156	Canada-Germany Tax Agreement Act, 1982	S-24
June 29, 1983	157	Judges Act and the Federal Court Act, An Act to amend the	C-166
June 29, 1983	158	Tax Court of Canada Act, An Act respecting the	C-167
June 29, 1983	159	Miscellaneous Statute Repeal Act	C-119
June 29, 1983	160	Industrial and Regional Development Act	C-165
June 29, 1983	161	Athletic Contests and Events Pools Act	C-95
June 29, 1983	162	Appropriation Act No. 2, 1983–84	C-164
October 19, 1983	163	Export Development Act, An Act to amend the	C-110
November 17, 1983	164	Canada Elections Act (No. 3), An Act to amend the	C-169
November 17, 1983	165	Canadian Aviation Safety Board Act	C-163
November 17, 1983	166	Bretton Woods Agreements Act (No. 2), An Act to amend the	C-168
November 17, 1983	167	Government Organization Act, 1983	C-152
November 17, 1983	168	Western Grain Transportation Act	C-155
November 30, 1983	169	Labour Adjustment Benefits Act, An Act to amend the	C-172
November 30, 1983	170	Financial Administration Act, An Act to amend the	C-96
November 30, 1983	171	Garnishment, Attachment and Pension Diversion Act, An Act to amend the	C-171
November 30, 1983	172	Atlantic Fisheries Restructuring Act	C-170
November 30, 1983	173	Appropriation Act No. 3, 1983–84	C-173

===== Local and private acts =====
Date of Assent	Index	Title	Bill Number
July 17, 1980	174	Pyramid Communications Limited, An Act to revive	S-8
December 11, 1980	175	Montilac Ltd. and Socam Ltd., An Act to revive	S-13
December 11, 1980	176	Tremus Industries Limited, An Act to revive	S-14
December 17, 1980	177	Canadian Merchant Service Guild, An Act respecting the	S-12
December 17, 1980	178	General Security Insurance Company of Canada, An Act to amend and repeal An Act to incorporate	S-18
March 18, 1981	179	Royal Canadian Legion, An Act respecting the	S-15
March 31, 1981	180	Lethbridge Stake of the Church of Jesus Christ of Latter-day Saints, An Act respecting the President of the	S-16
July 10, 1981	181	Ontario News Company, Limited and to provide for its continuance under the Canada Business Corporations Act, An Act to revive	S-20
July 10, 1981	182	Barber & Sons Limited and to provide for its continuance under the Canada Business Corporations Act, An Act to revive	S-21
July 10, 1981	183	Eastern Diversified Company Ltd. and to provide for its continuance under the Canada Business Corporations Act, An Act to revive	S-22
June 3, 1982	184	Army, Navy and Air Force Veterans in Canada, An Act to amend the Act of incorporation of the Association known as	S-25
August 4, 1982	185	Klein Limited and to provide for its continuance under the Canada Business Corporations Act, An Act to revive	S-26
August 4, 1982	186	Grand Lodge of the Benevolent and Protective Order of Elks of the Dominion of Canada, An Act to amend the Act of incorporation of The	S-27
March 30, 1983	187	Polyventreprise Ltée and to provide for its continuance under the Canada Business Corporations Act, An Act to revive	S-34
June 3, 1983	188	Eparch of the Eparchy of Saints Cyril and Methodius of Slovaks of the Byzantine Rite in Canada, An Act to incorporate the	S-35

==== 2nd Session ====
===== Public acts =====
Date of Assent	Index	Title	Bill Number
January 19, 1984	1	Income Tax Act and to make related amendments to the Canada Pension Plan and the Unemployment Insurance Act, 1971, An Act to amend the statute law relating to	C-2
February 23, 1984	2	British Columbia Indian Cut-Off Lands Settlement Act	C-18
March 29, 1984	3	Appropriation Act No. 4, 1983–84	C-27
March 29, 1984	4	Appropriation Act No. 1, 1984–85	C-28
April 5, 1984	5	Borrowing Authority Act, 1984–85	C-21
April 17, 1984	6	Canada Health Act	C-3
June 7, 1984	7	Prairie Grain Advance Payments Act, An Act to amend the	C-23
June 7, 1984	8	Coastal Fisheries Protection Act, An Act to amend the	C-4
June 7, 1984	9	Currency and Exchange Act, An Act to amend the	C-11
June 7, 1984	10	Yukon Quartz Mining Act, An Act to amend the	C-44
June 7, 1984	11	Skagit River Valley Treaty Implementation Act	C-41
June 7, 1984	12	Asia-Pacific Foundation of Canada Act	C-42
June 7, 1984	13	Federal-Provincial Fiscal Arrangements and Established Programs Financing Act, 1977, An Act to amend the	C-12
June 7, 1984	14	Hull, An Act to change the name of the electoral district of	C-205
June 7, 1984	15	Senate and House of Commons Act, An Act to amend the	C-241
June 7, 1984	16	Appropriation Act No. 2, 1984–85	C-45
June 14, 1984	17	Customs and Excise Offshore Application Act	C-16
June 14, 1984	18	Cree-Naskapi (of Quebec) Act	C-46
June 14, 1984	19	War Veterans Allowance Act, the Civilian War Pensions and Allowances Act and certain other Acts in relation thereto, An Act to amend the	C-39
June 28, 1984	20	Canada–United States Tax Convention Act, 1984	S-14
June 28, 1984	21	Canadian Security Intelligence Service Act	C-9
June 28, 1984	22	Customs Tariff, An Act to amend the	C-7
June 28, 1984	23	Radiation Emitting Devices Act	C-5
June 28, 1984	24	Western Arctic (Inuvialuit) Claims Settlement Act	C-49
June 28, 1984	25	Special Import Measures Act	C-8
June 28, 1984	26	National Housing Act, An Act to amend the	C-37
June 28, 1984	27	Old Age Security Act, An Act to amend the	C-40
June 28, 1984	28	National Flag of Canada Manufacturing Standards Act	C-234
June 29, 1984	29	Canada–Nova Scotia Oil and Gas Agreement Act	C-43
June 29, 1984	30	Bank Act, An Act to amend the	C-30
June 29, 1984	31	Financial Administration Act in relation to Crown corporations and to amend other Acts in consequence thereof	C-24
June 29, 1984	32	Canada–United Kingdom Civil and Commercial Judgments Convention Act, 1984	C-51
June 29, 1984	33	Public Service Superannuation Act, An Act to amend the	C-54
June 29, 1984	34	Mingan Archipelago National Park Act	C-53
June 29, 1984	35	Income Tax Act, An Act to implement conventions between Canada and multiple states for the avoidance of double taxation	S-11
June 29, 1984	36	Defence of Canada Regulations, An Act to grant access to records of the Special Committee on the	C-252
June 29, 1984	37	Canadian Institute for International Peace and Security Act	C-32
June 29, 1984	38	Western Grain Stabilization Act, An Act to amend the	C-33
June 29, 1984	39	Canada Labour Code and the Financial Administration Act, An Act to amend the	C-34
June 29, 1984	40	Miscellaneous Statute Law Amendment Act, 1984	C-58

===== Local and private acts =====
Date of Assent	Index	Title	Bill Number
April 5, 1984	51	United Grain Growers Limited, An Act to amend the Act of incorporation of	S-10
April 17, 1984	52	Marriage in the case of Gerald Harvey Fudge and Audrey Marie Saunders, An Act to provide an exception from the public general law relating to	S-2
April 17, 1984	53	Marriage in the case of Louis Philippe Nadeau and Marie Thérèse Rita Brulé, An Act to provide an exception from the public general law relating to	S-3
April 17, 1984	54	Marriage in the case of Ernest Hodel and Norma Dora Laurie, An Act to provide an exception from the public general law relating to	S-4
April 17, 1984	55	Marriage in the case of Benjamin Joseph Andrade and Heather Winnifred Andrade, An Act to provide an exception from the public general law relating to	S-5
April 17, 1984	56	Marriage in the case of Juan Andrade and Emilia Rodriguez, An Act to provide an exception from the public general law relating to	S-6
April 17, 1984	57	Marriage in the case of Henri Patry and Aldéa Béa Pitt, An Act to provide an exception from the public general law relating to	S-7
April 17, 1984	58	Marriage in the case of Joseph Roland Réjean Daoust and Marie Lise Sylvie Girard, An Act to provide an exception from the public general law relating to	S-8
April 17, 1984	59	Marriage in the case of Pearl Kim Le and Thomas Siegfried Wieland, An Act to provide an exception from the public general law relating to	S-9
June 14, 1984	60	Wesleyan Church of Canada, An Act to provide for the creation by amalgamation of The	S-15
June 29, 1984	61	Stadacona Mines (1944) Limited and to provide for its continuance under the Canada Business Corporations Act, An Act to revive	S-16

== See also ==
- List of Canadian electoral districts 1976-1987
