= List of members of the Canadian House of Commons with military service (A) =

| Name | Elected party | Constituency | Elected date | Military service |
|---|---|---|---|---|
| Douglas Charles Abbott | Liberal | St. Antoine—Westmount | March 26, 1940 | Canadian Army (1916–1918), Royal Air Force (1918-) |
| John Joseph Caldwell Abbott | Liberal-Conservative | Argenteuil | September 20, 1867 | Militia (1866-) |
| Agar Rodney Adamson | Conservative | York West | March 26, 1940 | Royal Air Force (1918-1918), Canadian Army (1939–1945) |
| Gordon Harvey Aiken | Progressive Conservative | Parry Sound-Muskoka | June 10, 1957 | Canadian Army (1944-) |
| Lincoln MacCauley Alexander | Progressive Conservative | Hamilton West | June 25, 1968 | Royal Canadian Air Force (1942–1945) |
| Leona Alleslev | Liberal (2014–2018); Conservative (2018–) | Aurora—Oak Ridges—Richmond Hill | October 19, 2015 | Royal Canadian Air Force (1987–1996) |
| Guillaume Amyot | Conservative | Bellechasse | March 19, 1881 | Militia |
| David Anderson | Liberal | Esquimalt—Saanich | June 25, 1968 | Royal Canadian Air Force (1955–1958) |
| Hugh Alan Anderson | Liberal | Comox—Alberni | July 8, 1974 | Royal Canadian Air Force |
| Robert King Anderson | Unionist | Halton | December 17, 1917 | Canadian Army |
| Robert Knight Andras | Liberal | Port Arthur | November 8, 1965 | Canadian Army |
| George William Andrews | Liberal (Unionist) | Winnipeg Centre | December 17, 1917 | Canadian Army |
| Ursula Appolloni | Liberal | York South | July 8, 1974 | Women's Royal Air Force (1948–1950) |
| Cyril Archibald | Liberal | Stormont | October 12, 1872 | Militia |
| Harry Grenfell Archibald | Cooperative Commonwealth Federation | Skeena | June 11, 1945 | Royal Canadian Air Force (1943–1945) |
| Ernest Frederick Armstrong | Conservative | Timiskaming South | October 29, 1925 | Canadian Army |
| James Arthurs | Conservative | Parry Sound | October 26, 1908 | Canadian Army |
| Thomas Gordon William Ashbourne | Liberal | Grand Falls—White Bay | June 27, 1949 | Canadian Army |
| Patrick Harvey Ashby | Social Credit Party | Edmonton East | June 11, 1945 | Canadian Army |
| Edmund Tobin Asselin | Liberal | Notre-Dame-de-Grâce | June 18, 1962 | Royal Canadian Air Force (1940–1946) |
| Henry Aylmer | Liberal | Richmond—Wolfe | January 22, 1874 | Royal Marine |
