= Timiskaming =

Algonquin place name used in Canada

Timiskaming is a word from the Algonquin Temikami or Temikaming, from tim 'deep' and kami 'open waters'. Alternate spellings include Temiskaming, Témiscaming and Témiscamingue. The word Temagami comes from the same root.

Controversy exists over the spelling of this word. A movement to change the spelling of the District of Timiskaming to Temiskaming (an e instead of an i) cites a typographical error by a government official, but the act of parliament that led to the name change granted this official authority to correct the spelling. What he considered to be a spelling correction, some people today call a spelling mistake.

The spelling controversy goes back to the 18th century. English maps from that century show the spelling of the lake as Temiscamin, Temescaming, Temiscaming, Timiscaming, and Temiscamino, with Temiscaming being the most common. Spelling of the name of the aboriginal tribe presented even more alternatives. In all cases, though, there is no k. The 21st Century has inherited a debate from the 18th Century.

It refers to the following places, all in northeastern Ontario and western Quebec, Canada:

- Lake Timiskaming (in French: Lac Témiscamingue)
- Timiskaming District, a census division of Ontario
  - Temiskaming Shores, city in the Timiskaming District
  - Unorganized East Timiskaming District, an unorganized territory in the Timiskaming District
  - Unorganized West Timiskaming District, an unorganized territory in the Timiskaming District
- Abitibi-Témiscamingue, a region located in western Quebec
  - Témiscamingue Regional County Municipality, a regional county municipality (RCM) in Abitibi-Témiscamingue
    - Timiskaming First Nation, a First Nation reserve in Témiscamingue RCM
    - Témiscaming, a city in Témiscamingue RCM
    - Les Lacs-du-Témiscamingue, Quebec, an unorganized territory in Témiscamingue RCM
    - Fort Témiscamingue, a former trading post and National Historic Site near Ville-Marie
- Federal and provincial ridings:
  - Abitibi—Témiscamingue, a federal electoral district in Quebec
  - Nipissing—Timiskaming, a federal riding in the province of Ontario
  - Rouyn-Noranda–Témiscamingue, a provincial electoral district in Quebec
  - Timiskaming—Cochrane (provincial electoral district), a provincial riding of Ontario

The name was also used in several abolished federal and provincial ridings:

- Timiskaming (provincial electoral district)
- Timiskaming (electoral district) (federal)
- Timiskaming—Cochrane (federal)
- Timiskaming—French River (federal)
- Timiskaming North (federal)
- Timiskaming South (federal)
- Témiscamingue (electoral district) (federal)
- Témiscamingue (provincial electoral district)
