= Timmins—Chapleau =

Federal electoral district of Canada

Ontario electoral district

Defunct federal electoral district
- Legislature: House of Commons
- District created: 1976; 49 years ago
- District abolished: 1996; 29 years ago
- First contested: 1979
- Last contested: 1993

Timmins—Chapleau was a federal electoral district represented in the House of Commons of Canada from 1979 to 1997. It was located in the northeast part of the province of Ontario. This riding was created in 1976 from parts of Cochrane, Nipissing, Timiskaming and Timmins ridings.

It initially consisted of the northern part of the Territorial District of Sudbury, the eastern part of the Territorial District of Algoma, the Township of Teefy, the City of Timmins and the Town of Iroquois Falls in the Territorial District of Cochrane, and the western part of the Territorial District of Timiskaming.

After 1987, it consisted of parts of the Territorial Districts of Algoma, Cochrane, Sudbury and Timiskaming.

The electoral district was abolished in 1996 when it was redistributed between Algoma, Nickel Belt, Timiskaming—Cochrane, and Timmins-James Bay ridings.

== Members of Parliament ==
This riding has elected the following members of Parliament:

Parliament	Years	Member	Party
Riding created from Timmins, Cochrane, Nipissing and Timiskaming
31st	1979–1980	Ray Chénier	Liberal
32nd	1980–1984	Ray Chénier	Liberal
33rd	1984–1988	Aurèle Gervais	Progressive Conservative
34th	1988–1993	Cid Samson	New Democratic
35th	1993–1997	Peter Thalheimer	Liberal
Riding dissolved into Timmins-James Bay, Algoma, Nickel Belt and Timiskaming—Cochrane

== Election results ==
1979 Canadian federal election: Timmins—Chapleau
Party	Candidate	Votes	%	±%
Liberal	Ray Chénier	13,577		
New Democratic Party	Dennis Welin	10,160		
Progressive Conservative	Ernie R. White	7,819		

1980 Canadian federal election: Timmins—Chapleau
Party	Candidate	Votes	%	±%
Liberal	Ray Chénier	15,628		
New Democratic Party	Bill Ferrier	10,745		
Progressive Conservative	Kent Davis	3,663		
Marxist–Leninist	Garnet Olson	57		

1984 Canadian federal election: Timmins—Chapleau
Party	Candidate	Votes	%	±%
Progressive Conservative	Aurèle Gervais	11,944		
Liberal	Marcel Chartrand	10,273		
New Democratic Party	Cid Samson	9,543		
No affiliation	Peter Nastasiuk Bruce	127		

1988 Canadian federal election: Timmins—Chapleau
Party	Candidate	Votes	%	±%
New Democratic Party	Cid Samson	11,622		
Liberal	Peter Thalheimer	10,347		
Progressive Conservative	Aurèle Gervais	9,782		

1993 Canadian federal election: Timmins—Chapleau
Party	Candidate	Votes	%	±%
Liberal	Peter Thalheimer	17,085		
New Democratic Party	Cid Samson	8,224		
Progressive Conservative	John Murphy	4,369		
National	Ronald Locas	443		
Natural Law	Ben Lefebvre	394		
Independent	Tilton Beaumont	290		

== See also ==
- List of Canadian electoral districts
- Historical federal electoral districts of Canada
