= Camil Samson =

Canadian politician (1935-2012)

Camil Samson (January 3, 1935 - December 18, 2012) was a politician in Quebec, Canada, Member of the National Assembly of Quebec (MNA), and leader of the Ralliement créditiste du Québec and other political parties.

== Background and personal life ==
He was born in Shawinigan, Quebec, to Wilbroy Samson, a journalist and farmer, and Irène Carle. He completed his studies in Shawinigan, Cléricy and at the Duchesnay forestry station. From 1952 to 1956, he worked in the forestry industry. From 1956 to 1970, he worked in the automobile industry as a salesman, service manager, and sales manager. He was also an insurance agent.

In 1997, he beat cancer of the bladder, but suffered from many health problems in his later years.

== Political activist ==
In 1963 and 1964, he was the president of the Jeunesse créditiste du Canada, the youth wing of the Ralliement créditiste, a political party that nominated candidates in federal elections and promoted social credit theories of monetary reform. He later became the secretary and vice president of the party. He was unsuccessful as the party's candidate in the Ontario-based Timiskaming riding in the 1963 federal election and in the Quebec-based Pontiac-Témiscamingue riding in the 1965 federal election. In the 1966 Quebec provincial election, he was the unsuccessful candidate for the Quebec separatist Ralliement national party in Temiscamingue riding. He was the president of the Chamber of Commerce in Rouyn-Noranda in 1969.

== Provincial politics ==
He founded the Ralliement créditiste du Québec party, and was named president of the party on January 24, 1970. This party was the provincial counterpart of the Ralliement créditiste du Canada, founded to promote social credit policies at the provincial level in Quebec.

In the 1970 Quebec election campaign, in an unfortunate moment of rhetorical transport, delivered this line in reference to the government against which he was running: "Ladies and gentlemen, the Union Nationale has brought you to the edge of the abyss. With Social Credit, you will take one step forward." The créditistes nonetheless benefited from the decline of the conservative Union Nationale party and made a modest breakthrough, winning 12 seats in the National Assembly and 11.2% of the vote; Samson was elected in the riding of Rouyn-Noranda. The party was never able to build on this initial success because it was wracked continually by internal divisions.

Samson served as leader of the party from March 22, 1970, to February 13, 1972. On March 16, Camil Samson was expelled from the party by nine of the créditiste MNAs (organized by interim leader Armand Bois) for criticizing some of the caucus members, and for not attending party meetings. On March 19, Samson declared himself to be the leader of a new créditiste group, and demanded to be seated in the National Assembly as a member of the "Registered Ralliement créditiste du Québec", along with two other créditiste MNAs, Aurèle Audet (Abitibi-Ouest) and Bernard Dumont (Mégantic). However, the speaker of the National Assembly recognized Armand Bois as parliamentary leader of the Ralliement créditiste du Québec. On August 11, Samson, Dumont and Audet rejoined the Ralliement créditiste.

He ran again for the leadership of the party at its convention on February 4, 1973, but was defeated by former federal Liberal cabinet minister Yvon Dupuis. Because Dupuis was not a sitting member of the National Assembly, Samson served as parliamentary leader of the renamed Parti créditiste from March 15 to September 25, 1973. He was re-elected in the 1973 provincial election, along with only one other créditiste, Fabien Roy. Before the 1976 election, there was a further split as the only two sitting Parti créditiste MNAs went their separate ways. Samson became leader of the party, once again called the Ralliement créditiste du Québec again on May 11, 1975, while Fabien Roy was expelled from the party.

Samson was re-elected in the 1976 provincial election as the only créditiste MNA. (Fabien Roy was the only MNA elected for his new party, the Parti national populaire.)

On November 12, 1978, Samson founded a new party, Les Démocrates, with Pierre Sévigny, who had been a Progressive Conservative Party of Canada Member of Parliament from 1958 to 1963. This party was renamed on January 1, 1980, the Parti démocrate créditiste.

On October 15, 1980, Samson joined the Parti libéral du Québec, bringing the Parti démocrate créditiste to an end. He was defeated in his bid for re-election to the National Assembly in Rouyn-Noranda–Témiscamingue riding in the 1981 provincial election.

== Radio host ==
He worked as a radio announcer for CKCV from 1981 to 1984, and for CHRC in Quebec City from 1984 to 1993. He also participated in numerous television broadcasts on Télévision Quatre-Saisons network from 1989 to 1991.

== Federal politics ==
He ran unsuccessfully as a Liberal candidate in the 1993 federal election, and was named special advisor to the federal minister responsible for the Quebec City region in 1994.

== Federal electoral record ==
1993 Canadian federal election: Quebec East
Party	Candidate	Votes
Bloc Québécois	Jean-Paul Marchand	34,203
Liberal	Camil Samson	14,003
Progressive Conservative	Marcel Tremblay	6,505
Natural Law	Pierre-Paul Paquet	1,059
New Democratic	Stéphanie Mitchell	938
Abolitionist	Henri Gagnon	364
National	Guy Sanfaçon	255

1965 Canadian federal election: Pontiac–Témiscamingue
Party	Candidate	Votes
Liberal	Thomas Lefebvre	6,593
Progressive Conservative	Paul Martineau	6,322
Ralliement créditiste	Camil Samson	3,279
New Democratic	Kenneth Morris	434
Independent SC	Terrence O'Reilly	194

1963 Canadian federal election: Timiskaming
Party	Candidate	Votes
New Democratic	Arnold Peters	7,356
Liberal	Mervyn Lavigne	6,763
Progressive Conservative	John Cram	5,540
Social Credit	Camil Samson	2,033

== Sources ==
- Camil Samson et le défi créditiste: l'homme, le parti et l'équipe, Québec, Éditions du Griffon, 1970, 195 p.

== See also ==
- List of third party leaders (Quebec)
- History of Quebec

National Assembly of Quebec
Preceded by Antonio Flamand (Union Nationale)	MNA for Rouyn-Noranda; 1970–1981	Succeeded by Gilles Baril
