= Ann Shipley =

Canadian politician

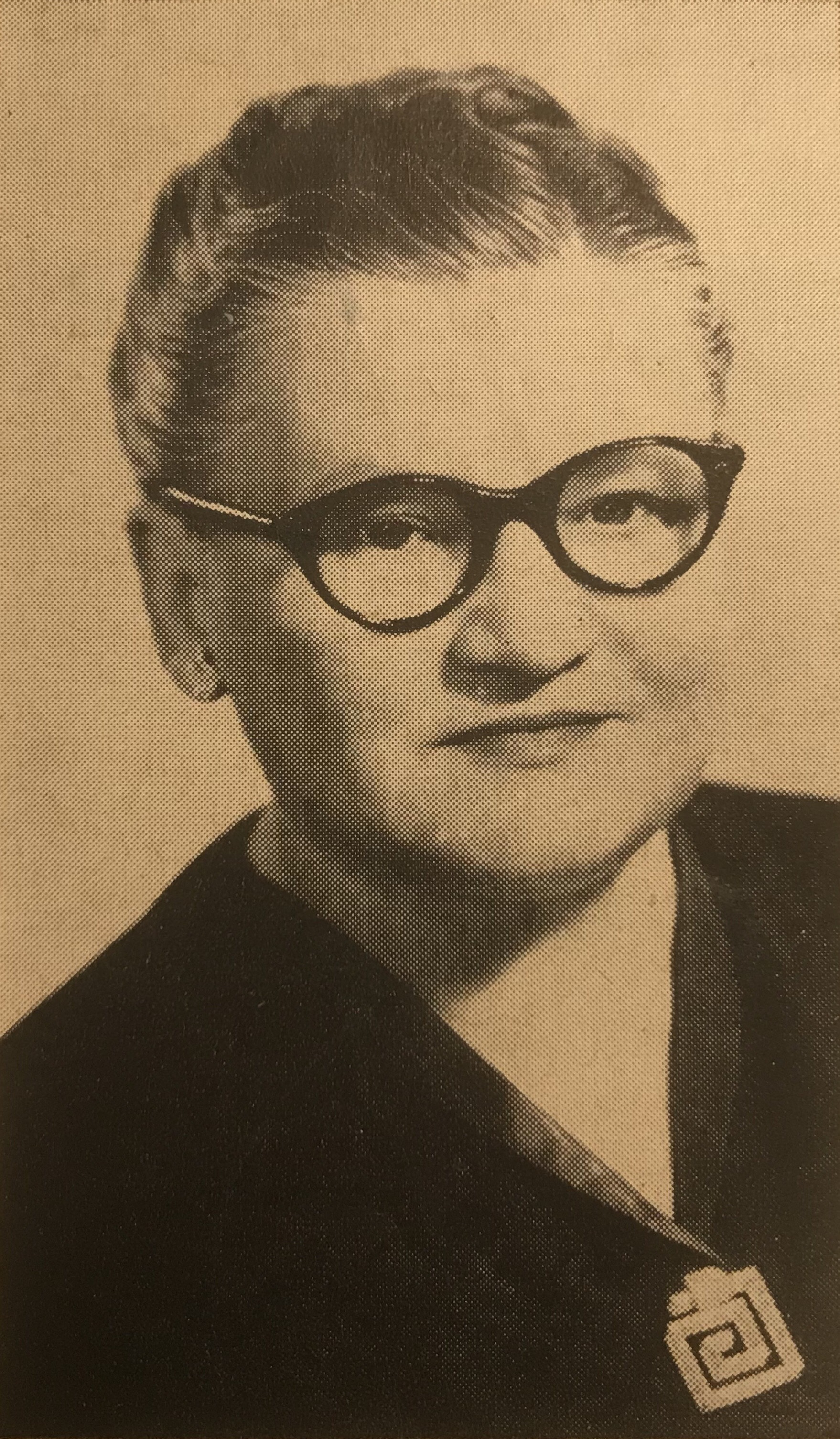

Member of Parliament for Timiskaming
- In office November 12, 1953 – April 12, 1957
- Preceded by: Walter Little
- Succeeded by: Arnold Peters

Personal details
- Born: Marie Ann Killins; April 8, 1899 Lawrence Station, Ontario, Canada
- Died: March 22, 1981 (aged 81)
- Party: Liberal
- Relations: William Dennis Killins (father), Mary Ann Lamont (mother)

Marie Ann Shipley (April 8, 1899 – March 22, 1981) was a Canadian politician.

== Biography ==
Born in Lawrence Station in Southwold, Ontario, she moved to Ottawa when she was 12, attended country school, Osgood Public School. She was then educated at Ottawa's Lisgar Collegiate and married Dr. Manley Adair Shipley.

=== Municipal politics ===
Shipley and her husband, Dr. Manley Shipley, settled in Kirkland Lake in 1928 where she was an administrative secretary for the Kirkland District Mines Medical Plans. For two years, she was an administrator of the public school board. As a result of contradictory sources, the year of Dr. Shipley's death is not definitive but occurred between 1940 and 1942.

From 1943 to 1952, she was reeve of Teck Township. Shipley was president of the Association of Municipalities of Ontario, in 1951.

After Shipley's term in 1952, she left her position in municipal politics. Shipley was a member within multiple organizations such as the Children's Aid Society, the Victorian Order of Nurses, the Hospital Board and the Red Cross Society, the Royal Canadian Legion, the Association of Canadian Travellers, the Girl Guides and the Business and Professional Women's Club. She was Protestant, and a member of the Young Women's Christian Association.

On January 28, 1953, the Township of Teck hosted a testimonial dinner in honour of Shipley's ongoing presence in the several organizations she has helped. The dinner consisted of "Approximately 200 citizens of the town [...] representing some 85 organizations" there to support and recognize her contributions to the community. She was also the administrator of the Canadian Federation of Municipalities and Mayors.

=== Member of Parliament ===
In August 1953, she joined the second administration of Louis St. Laurent and the 22nd Canadian Parliament as the Liberal Party Member of Parliament from the northeastern Ontario riding of Timiskaming.

In 1955, she became the first woman to move acceptance in the House of Commons of a Speech from the Throne.

Shipley ran for re-election in 1957, and lost her seat to Arnold Peters. She soldiered on and contested the seat again (unsuccessfully) for the 25th Canadian Parliament in 1963 before finally retiring from public life.
