= Murdo Martin =

Canadian politician (1917–1989)

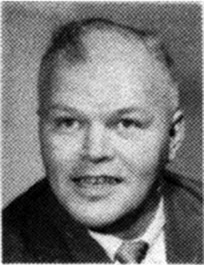

Member of Parliament for Timmins
- In office 1957–1968
- Preceded by: Karl Eyre
- Succeeded by: Jean Roy

Personal details
- Born: May 17, 1917 Gould, Quebec, Canada
- Died: January 2, 1989 (aged 71) Timmins, Ontario, Canada
- Party: Co-operative Commonwealth Federation → New Democratic Party
- Profession: firefighter

Murdo William Martin (May 17, 1917 – January 2, 1989) was a Canadian politician.

Born in Gould, Quebec, Martin was a firefighter with the town of Timmins when he was elected to the House of Commons for the Co-operative Commonwealth Federation in the 1957 federal election. Martin, a caucus mate of Timiskaming MP Arnold Peters, elected the same year, went on to establish himself as a forceful and effective representative of the working people of the Timmins area.

He was one of only eight CCF MPs elected in the Diefenbaker landslide of 1958, and was re-elected in the general elections of 1962, 1963 and 1965. He sought re-election in 1968 and 1972 but was defeated by the Liberal candidate, Jean Roy. Martin was an advocate for assistance for the gold mines in the Porcupine camp. He also spoke against the arcane divorce laws that existed in Canada prior to 1968.

After leaving the House of Commons, Martin went on to serve as a city councillor for Timmins City Council. He was also a real estate broker and owned an operated the Parkview Motel in Timmins. He was married to Grace Mills. Martin died in Timmins in 1989.

== Electoral record ==
1957 Canadian federal election
Party	Candidate	Votes	%	±%
Co-operative Commonwealth	Murdo MARTIN	6,776		
Liberal	Joseph J. EVANS	6,290		
Progressive Conservative	Percy BOYCE	4,423		

1958 Canadian federal election
Party	Candidate	Votes	%	±%
Co-operative Commonwealth	Murdo MARTIN	7,342		
Progressive Conservative	Émile BRUNETTE	6,252		
Liberal	Joseph J. EVANS	5,719		

1962 Canadian federal election
Party	Candidate	Votes	%	±%
New Democratic Party	Murdo MARTIN	8,834		
Liberal	Émile CLÉMENT	5,439		
Progressive Conservative	Mary GAUTHIER	4,676		
Social Credit	Ralph R. FEAR	805		

1963 Canadian federal election
Party	Candidate	Votes	%	±%
New Democratic Party	Murdo MARTIN	8,452		
Liberal	Leo DEL VILLANO	7,592		
Progressive Conservative	Émile BRUNETTE	3,068		
Social Credit	Clément LAROCHELLE	719		

1965 Canadian federal election
Party	Candidate	Votes	%	±%
New Democratic Party	Murdo MARTIN	10,071		
Liberal	Elmer E. SMITH	6,456		
Progressive Conservative	Bob KILLINGBECK	2,715		
Independent	John James BUCHAN	100		

1968 Canadian federal election
Party	Candidate	Votes	%	±%
Liberal	Jean ROY	11,141		
New Democratic Party	Murdo MARTIN	8,807		
Progressive Conservative	Wyman BREWER	2,118		

1972 Canadian federal election
Party	Candidate	Votes	%	±%
Liberal	Jean ROY	10,804		
New Democratic Party	Murdo MARTIN	9,819		
Progressive Conservative	Bill HICKEY	2,997		
Social Credit	John CORNELSEN	770		
