= Timmins (federal electoral district) =

Former federal electoral district in Ontario, Canada

Coordinates: 48.58°N 81.17°W

Ontario electoral district

Defunct federal electoral district
- Legislature: House of Commons
- District created: 1947
- District abolished: 1976
- First contested: 1949
- Last contested: 1974

Timmins was a federal electoral district represented in the House of Commons of Canada from 1949 to 1979. It was located around the city of Timmins in the northeastern part of the province of Ontario. This riding was created in 1947 from parts of Cochrane and Timiskaming ridings.

It consisted of portions of the territorial districts of Timiskaming and Cochrane.

The electoral district was abolished in 1976 when it was redistributed between Timiskaming and Timmins—Chapleau ridings.

== Members of Parliament ==
Parliament	Years	Member	Party
Riding created from Cochrane and Timiskaming
21st	1949–1953	Karl Eyre	Liberal
22nd	1953–1957	Karl Eyre	Liberal
23rd	1957–1958	Murdo Martin	Co-operative Commonwealth
24th	1958–1962	Murdo Martin	Co-operative Commonwealth
25th	1962–1963	Murdo Martin	New Democratic
26th	1963–1965	Murdo Martin	New Democratic
27th	1965–1968	Murdo Martin	New Democratic
28th	1968–1972	Jean Roy	Liberal
29th	1972–1974	Jean Roy	Liberal
30th	1974–1979	Jean Roy	Liberal
Riding dissolved into Timiskaming and Timmins—Chapleau

== Electoral history ==
1949 Canadian federal election
Party	Candidate	Votes	%	±%
Liberal	Karl Eyre	7,949		
Co-operative Commonwealth	Leo P. Lalonde	5,517		
Progressive Conservative	Percy Boyce	4,377		
Labor–Progressive	Raymond Leslie Stevenson	813		

1953 Canadian federal election
Party	Candidate	Votes	%	±%
Liberal	Karl Eyre	5,541		
Co-operative Commonwealth	Arnold Peters	4,686		
Progressive Conservative	Maurice Bélanger	3,348		
Labor–Progressive	Oscar Roy	369		

1957 Canadian federal election
Party	Candidate	Votes	%	±%
Co-operative Commonwealth	Murdo Martin	6,776		
Liberal	Joseph J. Evans	6,290		
Progressive Conservative	Percy Boyce	4,423		

1958 Canadian federal election
Party	Candidate	Votes	%	±%
Co-operative Commonwealth	Murdo Martin	7,342		
Progressive Conservative	Émile Brunette	6,252		
Liberal	Joseph J. Evans	5,719		

1962 Canadian federal election
Party	Candidate	Votes	%	±%
New Democratic	Murdo Martin	8,834		
Liberal	Émile Clément	5,439		
Progressive Conservative	Mary Gauthier	4,676		
Social Credit	Ralph R. Fear	805		

1963 Canadian federal election
Party	Candidate	Votes	%	±%
New Democratic	Murdo Martin	8,452		
Liberal	Leo del Villano	7,592		
Progressive Conservative	Émile Brunette	3,068		
Social Credit	Clément Larochelle	719		

1965 Canadian federal election
Party	Candidate	Votes	%	±%
New Democratic	Murdo Martin	10,071		
Liberal	Elmer E. Smith	6,456		
Progressive Conservative	Bob Killingbeck	2,715		
Independent	John James Buchan	100		

1968 Canadian federal election
Party	Candidate	Votes	%	±%
Liberal	Jean Roy	11,141		
New Democratic	Murdo Martin	8,807		
Progressive Conservative	Wyman Brewer	2,118		

1972 Canadian federal election
Party	Candidate	Votes	%	±%
Liberal	Jean Roy	10,804		
New Democratic	Murdo Martin	9,819		
Progressive Conservative	Bill Hickey	2,997		
Social Credit	John Cornelsen	770		

1974 Canadian federal election
Party	Candidate	Votes	%	±%
Liberal	Jean Roy	12,904		
New Democratic	Wally Rantala	7,681		
Progressive Conservative	John Huggins	4,098		
Social Credit	John Cornelsen	472		
Communist	Norman Hill	90		

== See also ==
- List of Canadian electoral districts
- Historical federal electoral districts of Canada
