= Arnold Peters =

Arnold Peters may refer to:

- Arnold Peters (politician)
- Arnold Peters (actor)
