= Michael Lucas (political activist) =

Canadian political activist

- Born: Michael Lukac; March 7, 1926; Vyšná Jablonka, Czechoslovakia
- Died: May 4, 2020 (aged 94)
- Education: Ontario College of Art and Design
- Occupations: Artist; Graphic designer; Political activist
- Political party: Communist Party of Canada
- Spouse: Helen Lucas
- Children: 2

Michael Lucas (born Michael Lukac; March 7, 1926 — May 4, 2020) was an artist, designer and political activist based in Toronto, Ontario. He was the Chair of the executive committee of the Canadian Friends of Soviet People, founded in 1991, and was formerly the chair of the USSR-Canada Friendship Association from 1972 until 1991. He was also the chair of the International Council of Friendship and Solidarity with Soviet People, operating out of Toronto. He a longtime leader of the Carpatho-Russian Society and was a longtime member of the Communist Party of Canada since his youth. He was also editor-in-chief of the Northstar Compass, the monthly magazine, published from 1991 until 2017, first by the Canadian Friends of Soviet People and then by the International Council of Friendship with Soviet People.

Lucas was born in Vyšná Jablonka in the Carpathian Mountains of eastern Slovakia. He moved to Canada as a child in 1938 to join his father, who had emigrated several years before to work in the nickel mines in Sudbury, Ontario, and become a union activist. The reunited family settled there initially before moving to Toronto.

Later, Lucas attended what is now the Ontario College of Art and Design and pursued a career in graphic design. In his professional life, Lucas was at various times the art director of CFTO-TV in Toronto, the director of the art department at Southam Newspapers, and led artistic and design teams at various advertising agencies.

Lucas visited Czechoslovakia and the Soviet Union many times in his life. He was in Czechoslovakia during the Soviet invasion that ended the Prague Spring and vocally supported Moscow's intervention upon his return to Canada.

Lucas died in Canada at the age of 94. He is survived by his wife Helen Lucas, the financial secretary of Canadian Friends of Soviet Peoples and their two children.

== See also ==
- Vic Ratsma
- Ray Stevenson
- Dyson Carter
