= Angus McDonald (politician, born 1867) =

Canadian politician

Angus McDonald (July 18, 1867 – September 25, 1926) was a Canadian politician. He represented the riding of Timiskaming in the House of Commons of Canada from 1920 to 1925 after winning a by-election in 1920 and retaining his seat in the 1921 general election.

He was an independent MP, with no party affiliation. Macdonald was a carpenter by trade and held pro-One Big Union sentiments. The area had deep radical labour roots, stemming back to strong IWW and OBU labour activism in 1907.

McDonald's riding was abolished prior to the 1925 election (to become the ridings of Timiskaming North and Timiskaming South), and he did not run in 1925 or any time later.

Parliament of Canada
| Preceded by Francis Cochrane | Member of Parliament for Timiskaming; 1920-1925 | Succeeded by riding split into Timiskaming North and Timiskaming South |
