= Ray Stevenson (political activist) =

Canadian communist (1919–2004)

Raymond Leslie Stevenson (December 17, 1919 – August 24, 2004) was a Canadian writer and political activist. He was an executive member of the International Council for Friendship and Solidarity with Soviet People and Associate and Editor of Northstar Compass – the organization's print publication. Stevenson worked on Northstar Compass for over thirteen years. Stevenson was an executive member of the World Peace Congress and a trade union organizer.

Stevenson was a member of the Communist Party of Canada from 1940 to 1998, serving for many years on its Central Committee and many of its Commissions.

== Biography ==
=== Early life and military service ===
Stevenson was born near Virden, Manitoba. He began working in the gold mines of north-eastern Manitoba in 1938 but moved to Kirkland Lake, Ontario, after being fired for being an "undesirable element". In Ontario, he worked for Upper Canada Mines and joined Local 240 of the militant Mine, Mill, and Smelters Union and participated in its 1941–1942 recognition strike.

He served in the Canadian Army from 1942 to 1946, as a first lieutenant. Due to his affiliations, he was not permitted to serve overseas during World War II. Though Stevenson requested that he be sent overseas several times, his requests were denied. He learned through "a clandestine source in army intelligence," that he "would not be shipped overseas for political reasons." "There was a long delay in sending us through [officer training] while HQ was making up its mind what to do with some of us," recalled Stevenson. Ultimately, he was assigned to develop a curriculum for soldiers facing overseas deployment, educating them on the nature of fascism. While warned not to teach the communist party line, he was allowed to choose fellow communist Sam Walsh as an aide and was eventually promoted to the rank of captain.

=== Political career and activism ===
He was active in the Communist Party's Dominion Communist-Labor Total War Committee, which campaigned for a "yes" vote in the 1942 referendum on conscription, i.e. in favour of its introduction (see Conscription Crisis of 1944).

Stevenson was a candidate for the Communist Party of Ontario (known as the Labor-Progressive Party) in the 1945 Ontario provincial election. Following the war, Stevenson became the educational director for the Workers Co-op in northern Ontario and was also a political organizer for the Labor-Progressive Party, running for the party in Timmins in the 1949 federal election.

Soon after joining mining firm Inco, he was, in 1951, elected to the executive of Local 598 in Sudbury. He served on the Canadian executive board of Mine, Mill until 1961, when he became editor of the Mine Mill Herald. In 1967, Mine Mill was taken over by the United Steel Workers of America and Stevenson served as editor of the USWA's Information until 1972. From 1972 until 1978 he was the public relations director for USWA Canada. Stevenson left the USWA in 1978 when he accepted a position as the Canadian Secretary for the World Peace Council in Finland, he subsequently served as the WPC's Trade Union Secretary and helped establish the International Union Committee for Peace and Disarmament in 1980. He was also active with the Canadian Peace Congress.

Stevenson opposed what he viewed as the Communist Party of Canada's tendency towards revisionism. After concluding that the CPC was no longer a Marxist party, he resigned from it, after more than 60 years of membership. He was a founding editor of the anti-revisionist magazine Northstar Compass in 1991 until 1995. In his final years, he was an executive member of the International Council for Friendship and Solidarity with Soviet People.

=== Death ===
Stevenson died on August 24, 2004, at St. Michael's Hospital in Toronto after a long illness, at the age of 84. His ashes were scattered in his native Manitoba at the site of his first school. He was survived by his wife Lil Greene. Stevenson left $5,000 to Northstar Compass; the publication used it to start the "Ray Stevenson Sustaining Fund", taking donations to keep the publication going.

== See also ==
- Michael Lucas
- Vic Ratsma
