= Paul Martineau =

Canadian politician (1921–2010)

The Hon. Paul Raymond Martineau

Member of the Canadian Parliament for Pontiac—Témiscamingue
- In office March 31, 1958 – November 8, 1965
- Preceded by: Hugh Proudfoot
- Succeeded by: Thomas Lefebvre

Personal details
- Born: April 10, 1921 Bryson, Quebec, Canada
- Died: March 19, 2010 (aged 88)
- Party: Progressive Conservative
- Education: University of Ottawa; Université de Montréal
- Cabinet: Minister of Mines and Technical Surveys (1962–1963)
- Portfolio: Parliamentary Secretary to the Prime Minister (1959–1961)

Paul Raymond Martineau PC QC KCSG (April 10, 1921 – March 19, 2010) was a Canadian politician, lawyer, crown attorney, and judge.

The son of Alphonse Martineau and Lucienne Lemieux, Martineau grew up in the Quebec portion of the Ottawa Valley. He received a Bachelor of Arts degree in 1941 from the University of Ottawa. He served for four years in the Royal Canadian Air Force during World War II and was subsequently president of the Quebec branch of the Royal Canadian Legion. After the war, he received a Bachelor of Civil Law degree from the Université de Montréal. He was called to the Bar of Quebec in 1949. A private practice lawyer from 1950 to 1980, he was a crown attorney from 1950 to 1958.

In 1946, he married Helene Neclaw.

He was defeated in the 1957 federal election in his first attempt to win a seat in the House of Commons of Canada but was elected in the 1958 election as the Progressive Conservative Member of Parliament for Pontiac—Témiscamingue. Martineau served as parliamentary secretary to Prime Minister John Diefenbaker from 1959 to 1961. He was then Deputy Speaker of the House until 1962 when he joined the Canadian Cabinet as Minister of Mines and Technical Surveys.

Martineau kept his seat in the 1963 election that defeated the Diefenbaker government. This contest was the only one in Andre Blais' analysis of 4,626 constituency races in Canada's post-World War II history to have an exact tie, with both Martineau and his challenger, Paul Oliva Goulet, receiving 6,448 votes. The tie was settled by the casting vote of the Returning Officer. In Opposition, he played a significant role in the Great Flag Debate of 1964, when he broke with Diefenbaker in order to support the adoption of the Maple Leaf flag.

The new flag is the symbol of the future because it expresses unity, that unity to which so many of us have paid lip service during the course of this debate. I believe that in the maple leaf flag Canadians of whatever origin or background may find something in common. I believe this maple leaf flag will express for Canadians, in their own undemonstrative and taciturn way, the firm conviction that Canadians want to live together, work together, and build a worthwhile nation. If this distinctive flag can be accepted by the country without lasting bitterness and acrimony, then Canadians will have gone a long way to prove to the world that a nation such as ours, born in strife, diverse in its origins, speaking two languages and being the embodiment of two great cultures, can survive and prosper....

Journalist Peter C. Newman described Martineau's intervention as "the best speech of the entire debate."

Matineau lost his seat in the 1965 election and was also defeated in his attempt to regain his seat in 1968.

From 1980 to 1996, he was a Justice of the Quebec Superior Court.

== Electoral record ==
1958 Canadian federal election: Pontiac–Témiscamingue
Party	Candidate	Votes
Progressive Conservative	Paul Martineau	8,842
Liberal	Hugh Proudfoot	8,431

1962 Canadian federal election: Pontiac–Témiscamingue
Party	Candidate	Votes
Progressive Conservative	Paul Martineau	6,137
Liberal	Paul-Oliva Goulet	6,005
Social Credit	Laurent Legault	4,624
New Democratic	Alex Parker	381

1963 Canadian federal election: Pontiac–Témiscamingue
Party	Candidate	Votes
Progressive Conservative	Paul Martineau	6,448
Liberal	Paul-Oliva Goulet	6,448
Social Credit	Yvan Beaulé	3,339
New Democratic	Lorne Catherwood	351

1965 Canadian federal election: Pontiac–Témiscamingue
Party	Candidate	Votes
Liberal	Thomas Lefebvre	6,593
Progressive Conservative	Paul Martineau	6,322
Ralliement créditiste	Camil Samson	3,279
New Democratic	Kenneth Morris	434
Independent SC	Terrence O'Reilly	194

Political offices
Preceded by Hugh John Flemming (acting)	Minister of Mines and Technical Surveys; 1962–1963	Succeeded by William Moore Benidickson
