= Thomas Lefebvre =

Canadian politician

The Honourable Thomas Lefebvre

Member of the Canadian Parliament for Pontiac—Témiscamingue
- In office 1965–1968
- Preceded by: Paul Martineau
- Succeeded by: District abolished in 1966

Member of the Canadian Parliament for Pontiac (Pontiac—Gatineau—Labelle after 1978)
- In office 1968–1984
- Preceded by: Riding created in 1966
- Succeeded by: Barry Moore

Senator for De Lanaudière, Quebec
- In office 1984–1992
- Appointed by: John Turner
- Preceded by: Sarto Fournier
- Succeeded by: Paul Massicotte

Personal details
- Born: 23 May 1927 North Bay, Ontario, Canada
- Died: 20 November 1992 (aged 65)
- Party: Liberal
- Portfolio: Parliamentary Secretary to the President of the Treasury Board (1977-1979)

Thomas-Henri Lefebvre (23 May 1927 – 20 November 1992) was a Liberal party member of the House of Commons of Canada. He was born in North Bay, Ontario and became a garage owner and operator by career.

The son of Jean-Charles Lefebvre and Clarilda Provost, he was educated in North Bay and established himself in business in Témiscamingue, Quebec. In 1951, he married Léatrice-Lucille Vaillancourt. Lefebvre served on the town council for Témiscamingue from 1961 to 1965. He was elected at Quebec's Pontiac—Témiscamingue electoral district in the 1965 federal election. He was re-elected in the 1972, 1974, 1979 and 1980 federal elections as the riding changed names to Pontiac and Pontiac—Gatineau—Labelle.

Lefebvre served six consecutive terms in the 27th through 32nd Canadian Parliaments until becoming a Senator of the De Lanaudière division in 1984. He remained a member of the Canadian Senate until his death in 1992 of cancer.

There is a Thomas Lefebvre fonds at Library and Archives Canada.

== Electoral record ==
1980 Canadian federal election: Pontiac—Gatineau—Labelle
Party	Candidate	Votes	%	±%
Liberal	Thomas Lefebvre	21,605	70.39	+6.62
Progressive Conservative	André Benoit	5,151	16.78	-1.64
New Democratic	Jean-Pierre Paillet	2,813	9.16	+3.87
Rhinoceros	Gaston Lagaffe Beauregard	643	2.09	+0.22
Union populaire	Vianney Lehouiller	306	1.00	+0.07
Marxist–Leninist	Alain Charette	176	0.57	
Total valid votes		30,694	100.00	
Source: Canadian Elections Database

1979 Canadian federal election: Pontiac—Gatineau—Labelle
Party	Candidate	Votes	%	±%
Liberal	Thomas Lefebvre	20,253	63.76	+8.09
Progressive Conservative	Sant Singh	5,851	18.42	-4.82
Social Credit	Rita Jones	3,084	9.71	-5.24
New Democratic	Ida Brown	1,682	5.30	-0.84
Rhinoceros	Gaston Beauregard	597	1.88	
Union populaire	Vianney Lehouiller	295	0.93	
Total valid votes		31,762	100.00	

1974 Canadian federal election: Pontiac
Party	Candidate	Votes	%	±%
Liberal	Thomas Lefebvre	12,642	55.67	+4.91
Progressive Conservative	Sant Singh	5,277	23.24	+6.03
Social Credit	Emmanuel Pétrin	3,394	14.95	-13.15
New Democratic	Raymond Carrier	1,394	6.14	+2.20
Total valid votes		22,707	100.00	

1972 Canadian federal election: Pontiac
Party	Candidate	Votes	%	±%
Liberal	Thomas Lefebvre	11,780	50.76	+1.70
Social Credit	L.-P. Larocque	6,519	28.09	+16.51
Progressive Conservative	Octave Vallée	3,993	17.21	-18.18
New Democratic	André Synnott	913	3.93	-0.02
Total valid votes		23,205	100.00	
Source: Canadian Elections Database

Note: Social Credit vote is compared to Ralliement créditiste vote in the 1968 election.

1968 Canadian federal election: Pontiac
Party	Candidate	Votes	%
Liberal	Thomas Lefebvre	10,250	49.07
Progressive Conservative	Paul Martineau	7,392	35.39
Ralliement créditiste	Louis-P. Larocque	2,420	11.59
New Democratic	James A. wood Shannon	827	3.96
Total valid votes		20,889	100.00

1965 Canadian federal election: Pontiac–Témiscamingue
Party	Candidate	Votes
Liberal	Thomas Lefebvre	6,593
Progressive Conservative	Paul Martineau	6,322
Ralliement créditiste	Camil Samson	3,279
New Democratic	Kenneth Morris	434
Independent SC	Terrence O'Reilly	194
