= Aurèle Gervais =

Canadian politician (1933–2021)

Member of Parliament for Timmins—Chapleau
- In office November 5, 1984 – October 1, 1988
- Preceded by: Ray Chénier
- Succeeded by: Cid Samson

Personal details
- Born: February 1, 1933
- Died: December 25, 2021 (aged 88)
- Party: Progressive Conservative
- Profession: businessman

Aurèle Gervais (February 1, 1933 - December 25, 2021) was a Canadian politician who represented the electoral district of Timmins—Chapleau in the House of Commons of Canada from 1984 to 1988. He was a member of the Progressive Conservative Party.

Gervais was defeated in the 1988 election by Cid Samson. He died on December 25, 2021, at the age of 88.
