= Malcolm Lang (politician) =

Canadian politician (1875–1941)

Member of Parliament for Timiskaming South
- In office 1926–1930
- Preceded by: Ernest Frederick Armstrong
- Succeeded by: Wesley Gordon

Ontario MPP
- In office 1914–1926
- Preceded by: New riding
- Succeeded by: Riding abolished
- Constituency: Cochrane

Personal details
- Born: February 25, 1875 Eagle, Ontario, Canada
- Died: February 24, 1941 (aged 65)
- Party: Liberal
- Occupation: Prospector

Malcolm Lang (February 25, 1875 – February 24, 1941) was a Canadian politician, prospector and contractor.

He was born in Eagle, Elgin County, Ontario. Lang was first elected to the Ontario legislature in the 1914 provincial election as the Ontario Liberal Party Member of the Legislative Assembly for Cochrane. He was re-elected in 1919 and 1923. While still a Liberal MLA, Lang attempted to move to federal politics in 1925 as a Labour candidate in Timiskaming South. According to the House of Commons website, Lang faced off against another Labour candidate as well as the successful Conservative candidate. He was elected to the House of Commons of Canada on his next attempt, in the 1926 federal election in a straight contest against the Conservative incumbent and with the unofficial support of the Liberals who did not stand a candidate. Though a Labour MP, Lang generally supported the federal Liberal government of William Lyon Mackenzie King and ran for re-election in the 1930 federal election as a Liberal-Labour candidate, with the full backing of the Liberal party, but was unsuccessful.
