= Benoît Serré =

Canadian politician (1951–2019)

Member of Parliament for Timiskaming
- In office 1993–1997
- Preceded by: John MacDougall
- Succeeded by: riding dissolved

Member of Parliament for Timiskaming—Cochrane
- In office 1997–2004
- Preceded by: first member
- Succeeded by: riding dissolved

Personal details
- Born: April 7, 1951 Field, Ontario, Canada
- Died: May 11, 2019 (aged 68) Ontario, Canada
- Party: Liberal

Benoît Serré (April 7, 1951 – May 11, 2019) was a Canadian politician. He represented the riding of Timiskaming—French River from 1993 to 1997, and Timiskaming—Cochrane from 1997 to 2004, in the House of Commons of Canada. He was a member of the Liberal Party. He served as Parliamentary Secretary to the Minister of Natural Resources.

Serré was an accountant and business consultant before entering politics. He is the younger brother of Gaetan Serré, who served as MP for the neighbouring riding of Nickel Belt from 1968 to 1972.

He did not stand for re-election in the 2004 election. Serré died on May 11, 2019, from cancer.
