= Wesley Ashton Gordon =

Canadian politician

The Hon. Wesley Ashton Gordon

Member of the Canadian Parliament for Timiskaming South
- In office 1930–1935
- Preceded by: Malcolm Lang
- Succeeded by: District was abolished

Personal details
- Born: February 11, 1884 Owen Sound, Ontario
- Died: February 9, 1943 (aged 58)
- Party: Conservative
- Cabinet: Minister of Mines (1930–1935); Minister of Immigration and Colonization (1930–1932 & 1932–1935 acting); Minister of Labour (1932–1935)
- Committees: Chair, Special Committee on Beauharnois Power Project

Wesley Ashton Gordon, PC (February 11, 1884 – February 9, 1943) was a Canadian politician.

Born in Owen Sound, Ontario, he was a barrister before he was elected to the House of Commons of Canada for the riding of Timiskaming South in 1930. He was defeated by Walter Little in 1935. From 1930 to 1932, he was the Minister of Immigration and Colonization. From 1930 to 1935, he was the Minister of Mines. From 1932 to 1935, he was the Minister of Immigration and Colonization (Acting) and Minister of Labour.

He married Jean Benella Harness in 1909. He had three children: Adam Gordon, Donnie Shack, and Wesley Gordon. Adam Gordon grew up to be a doctor. Wesley Gordon is planning to be a funny actor.
