= Jean Roy (politician) =

Canadian politician

Jean Robert Roy

Member of Parliament for Timmins
- In office June 1968 – March 1979
- Preceded by: Murdo Martin
- Succeeded by: riding dissolved

Personal details
- Born: 12 November 1923 Timmins, Ontario, Canada
- Died: 28 December 1996 (aged 73) Timmins, Ontario, Canada
- Party: Liberal
- Spouse(s): Georgette Clément (m. 1947)
- Profession: businessman, contractor, quantity surveyor

Jean Robert Roy (12 November 1923 – 28 December 1996) was a Liberal party member of the House of Commons of Canada. He was born in Timmins, Ontario and became a businessman, contractor and quantity surveyor by career.

Roy, a Franco-Ontarian, studied at Queen's University in Kingston, Ontario before working in accounting, then in the construction industry.

He was first elected at the Timmins riding in the 1968 general election. Roy was re-elected there in the 1972 and 1974 federal elections, and after completing his term in the 30th Parliament he left federal politics due to reported health concerns.

During a House of Commons session during the 1970 October Crisis, Roy excoriated NDP members who opposed the proclamation of the War Measures Act in response to terrorist actions in Quebec. NDP member Harold Winch demanded that Roy retract an accusation that Winch's party's vote against the Act was tantamount to "support for the murderers".

Roy also opposed increases in Canadian content on television as his riding's only available television broadcasts at that time were from CBC Television and felt a reduction in the minimal American programming provided would be a "disservice".

After he left federal politics, he was President of the Standards Council of Canada and served on the International Joint Commission that deals with rivers and lakes on the border between Canada and the United States.

Roy died suddenly at his home in Timmins on 28 December 1996, leaving a daughter, a son and his wife Georgette Clément (m. 1947).
