= Cid Samson =

Canadian politician

Member of Parliament for Timmins—Chapleau
- In office 12 December 1988 – 8 September 1993
- Preceded by: Aurèle Gervais
- Succeeded by: Peter Thalheimer

Personal details
- Born: 26 January 1943 (age 83) Windsor, Ontario
- Party: New Democratic Party
- Profession: businessman, miner

Cyril (Cid) Samson (born 26 January 1943) is a former Canadian politician. He represented the electoral district of Timmins—Chapleau in the House of Commons of Canada from 1988 to 1993.

Samson was a member of the New Democratic Party.
