= Karl Eyre =

Canadian politician

Member of Parliament for Timmins
- In office September 15, 1949 – April 12, 1957
- Preceded by: first member
- Succeeded by: Murdo Martin

Personal details
- Born: June 11, 1896 Yonge Mills, Ontario, Canada
- Died: September 4, 1964 (aged 68) Timmins, Ontario, Canada
- Party: Liberal
- Profession: farmer, manufacturer, mayor

Karl Arliss Eyre (June 11, 1896 – September 4, 1964) was a Canadian politician. He represented the electoral district of Timmins in the House of Commons of Canada from 1949 to 1957 as a member of the Liberal Party.

Prior to his election to the House of Commons, Eyre served one term as Mayor of Timmins.

== Electoral record ==
1953 Canadian federal election: Timmins
| Party | Candidate | Votes | % | ±% |
|---|---|---|---|---|
| Liberal | Karl EYRE | 5,541 | | |
| Co-operative Commonwealth | Arnold PETERS | 4,686 | | |
| Progressive Conservative | Maurice BÉLANGER | 3,348 | | |
| Labor–Progressive | Oscar ROY | 369 | | |

1949 Canadian federal election: Timmins
| Party | Candidate | Votes | % | ±% |
|---|---|---|---|---|
| Liberal | Karl EYRE | 7,949 | | |
| Co-operative Commonwealth | Leo P. LALONDE | 5,517 | | |
| Progressive Conservative | Percy BOYCE | 4,377 | | |
| Labor–Progressive | Raymond Leslie STEVENSON | 813 | | |
