= Peter Thalheimer =

Canadian politician and lawyer (1936–2018)

Member of Parliament for Timmins—Chapleau
- In office 17 January 1994 – 27 April 1997
- Preceded by: Cid Samson
- Succeeded by: riding dissolved

Personal details
- Born: 4 June 1936 Unity, Saskatchewan
- Died: April 17, 2018 (aged 81) Rockland, Ontario
- Party: Liberal
- Profession: Lawyer

Peter Thalheimer (June 4, 1936 – April 17, 2018) was a member of the House of Commons of Canada from 1993 to 1997. He was a lawyer by career, joining the Ontario bar in 1964 after studying at the University of Ottawa.

Thalheimer established a legal practice in Timmins and served as a municipal solicitor there.

He first campaigned for a seat in federal Parliament in the 1988 federal election but lost to NDP candidate Cid Samson at the Timmins—Chapleau electoral district. In the 1993 federal election, Thalheimer beat Samson in the riding and served on the 35th Canadian Parliament. After completing his term of office, Thalheimer did not seek re-election in 1997 indicating that his departure from federal politics was due to health problems.
