= Ernest Frederick Armstrong =

Canadian politician

Member of Parliament for Timiskaming South
- In office 1925–1926
- Preceded by: Created from Nipissing and Timiskaming ridings
- Succeeded by: Malcolm Lang

Personal details
- Born: July 14, 1878 Flesherton, Ontario, Canada
- Died: March 14, 1948 (aged 69)
- Party: Conservative
- Profession: dental surgeon

Ernest Frederick Armstrong (July 14, 1878 – March 14, 1948) was a Canadian politician, soldier and dental surgeon. He was elected to the House of Commons of Canada in the 1925 election as a Member of the Conservative Party of Canada representing the riding of Timiskaming South. He was defeated in the 1926 election.

Born in Flesherton, Ontario, Canada, Armstrong served during World War I as commanding officer for the 159th Battalion, Canadian Expeditionary Force and the 197th Regiment and also served with the 4th Division in France and Belgium.
