= Hugh Proudfoot =

Canadian politician

Member of Parliament for Pontiac—Témiscamingue
- In office June 1949 – March 1958

Personal details
- Born: John Hugh Proudfoot; 18 May 1912 Fort-Coulonge, Quebec, Canada
- Died: 30 November 1980 (aged 68) Shawville, Quebec, Canada
- Party: Liberal
- Profession: breeder, lumberman

John Hugh Proudfoot (18 May 1912 – 30 November 1980) was a Liberal party member of the House of Commons of Canada. He was a breeder and lumberman by career.

The son of A.G. Proudfoot and Esther M. Creighton, Hugh Proudfoot was born in Fort-Coulonge, Quebec where he served as mayor from 1945 to 1950. In 1937, he married Iva Winifred Langford. In the 1949 federal election, he won a Parliamentary seat at the Pontiac—Témiscamingue riding. Proudfoot was re-elected for successive terms in 1953 and 1957, then in 1958 was defeated by Paul Martineau of the Progressive Conservative party.

Proudfoot died in 1980, aged 68.

== Electoral record ==
1949 Canadian federal election: Pontiac–Témiscamingue
Party	Candidate	Votes
Liberal	Hugh Proudfoot	7,817
Progressive Conservative	John McLean Argue	5,149
Independent Liberal	Philippe Chabot	3,041
Union des électeurs	Charles-Alfred Sauvé	1,562
Co-operative Commonwealth	Douglas Langford Campbell	362

1953 Canadian federal election: Pontiac–Témiscamingue
Party	Candidate	Votes
Liberal	Hugh Proudfoot	9,041
Progressive Conservative	Hector Bélec	6,373

1957 Canadian federal election: Pontiac–Témiscamingue
Party	Candidate	Votes
Liberal	Hugh Proudfoot	8,642
Progressive Conservative	Paul-A. Martineau	7,878
