= Vic Ratsma =

- Born: Wieste Ratsma; 1934; Netherlands
- Died: November 17, 2004 (aged 69–70); Dartmouth, Nova Scotia
- Education: University of Manitoba
- Occupations: Journalist; Essayist; Political activist
- Political party: New Democratic Party

Wietse (Vic) Ratsma (1934–2004) was a journalist and political activist. Born in the Netherlands, he came to Canada and worked as a quality control inspector for the Canada Post while raising his family in the city of Winnipeg, Manitoba.

He has been described as a "lifelong political activist, antiwar organizer, poet and essayist," but argued that he was not qualified to be called a poet. He stated that he would prefer to be labeled as a person who "occasionally writes some poetry as well".

For a number of years, he was active in the labor movement and graduated from the university-Labor program at the University of Manitoba. He was a member of the New Democratic Party and ran for political office twice.

In 1975, he joined the Canada-USSR Friendship Association, and was the secretary of the Winnipeg branch for many years. Vic Ratsma was the producer and the host of a cable TV show for close to ten years, showing Soviet films, interviewing Soviet delegates visiting Canada, and informing the viewers about the latest developments in the USSR. Of the forty-two branches of the Canada-USSR Friendship Association, the Winnipeg branch was the only one to obtain sustained broadcast exposure.

After the collapse of the USSR, Ratsma continued his solidarity work through the newly formed Canadian Friends of Soviet People and International Council for Friendship and Solidarity with Soviet People, which was formed at a world conference in the city of Toronto, Ontario, Canada in September 2001.

His articles were translated into many languages and published in multiple countries, including Nepal, India, Russia, the Netherlands, and Ukraine. He most notably contributed to Northstar Compass, Organ of the Canadian Friends of Soviet People, in addition to Axis of Logic, an alternative media outlet.

On November 17, 2004, after a long struggle with cancer, Vic Ratsma died with his family beside him at a hospital in Dartmouth, Nova Scotia. He had lived there since 1959.

== Electoral record ==
1966 Manitoba general election: Fort Garry
Party	Candidate	Votes	%	±%
Progressive Conservative	Sterling Lyon	6,131	59.32	+5.16
Liberal	Peter Stokes	2,435	23.56	-8.88
New Democratic	Vic Ratsma	1,769	17.12	+3.72
Total valid votes		10,335	99.75	+0.94
Total rejected ballots		26	0.25	-0.94
Turnout		10,361	66.89	+0.84
Eligible voters		15,489		
Progressive Conservative hold		Swing		+7.02

== See also ==
- Michael Lucas
- Ray Stevenson
