= Pontiac–Témiscamingue (federal electoral district) =

Former federal electoral district in Quebec, Canada

Pontiac—Témiscamingue
Quebec electoral district

Defunct federal electoral district
- Legislature: House of Commons
- District created: 1947
- District abolished: 1967
- First contested: 1949
- Last contested: 1965

Pontiac—Témiscamingue was a federal electoral district in Quebec, Canada, that was represented in the House of Commons of Canada from 1949 to 1968.

This riding was created in 1947 from Pontiac riding.

It was defined to consist of:

- the county of Pontiac;
- the towns of Belleterre and Témiscamingue and the county of Témiscamingue, except the township of Montreuil, Rémigny, Beaumesnil, Clérion, Chabert, Landanet, Mazérac, Jourdan, Pélissier and Granet and all the townships situated north of Granet.

In 1966, it was split into the new electoral districts of Pontiac and Témiscamingue.

== Members of Parliament ==
This riding elected the following members of Parliament:

Parliament	Years	Member	Party
Pontiac—Témiscamingue; Riding created from Pontiac
21st	1949–1953	Hugh Proudfoot	Liberal
22nd	1953–1957	Hugh Proudfoot	Liberal
23rd	1957–1958	Hugh Proudfoot	Liberal
24th	1958–1962	Paul Martineau	Progressive Conservative
25th	1962–1963	Paul Martineau	Progressive Conservative
26th	1963–1965	Paul Martineau	Progressive Conservative
27th	1965–1968	Thomas Lefebvre	Liberal
Riding dissolved into Pontiac and Témiscamingue

== Election results ==
1949 Canadian federal election
Party	Candidate	Votes
Liberal	Hugh Proudfoot	7,817
Progressive Conservative	John McLean Argue	5,149
Independent Liberal	Philippe Chabot	3,041
Union des électeurs	Charles-Alfred Sauvé	1,562
Co-operative Commonwealth	Douglas Langford Campbell	362

1953 Canadian federal election
Party	Candidate	Votes
Liberal	Hugh Proudfoot	9,041
Progressive Conservative	Hector Bélec	6,373

1957 Canadian federal election
Party	Candidate	Votes
Liberal	Hugh Proudfoot	8,642
Progressive Conservative	Paul-A. Martineau	7,878

1958 Canadian federal election
Party	Candidate	Votes
Progressive Conservative	Paul Martineau	8,842
Liberal	Hugh Proudfoot	8,431

1962 Canadian federal election
Party	Candidate	Votes
Progressive Conservative	Paul Martineau	6,137
Liberal	Paul-Oliva Goulet	6,005
Social Credit	Laurent Legault	4,624
New Democratic	Alex Parker	381

1963 Canadian federal election
Party	Candidate	Votes
Progressive Conservative	Paul Martineau	6,448
Liberal	Paul-Oliva Goulet	6,448
Social Credit	Yvan Beaulé	3,339
New Democratic	Lorne Catherwood	351

1965 Canadian federal election
Party	Candidate	Votes
Liberal	Thomas Lefebvre	6,593
Progressive Conservative	Paul Martineau	6,322
Ralliement créditiste	Camil Samson	3,279
New Democratic	Kenneth Morris	434
Independent SC	Terrence O'Reilly	194

== See also ==
- List of Canadian electoral districts
- Historical federal electoral districts of Canada
