= Timiskaming—Cochrane (federal electoral district) =

Former federal electoral district in Ontario, Canada

Coordinates: 47.77°N 79.97°W

Ontario electoral district

Defunct federal electoral district
- Legislature: House of Commons
- District created: 1996
- District abolished: 2003
- First contested: 1997
- Last contested: 2000

Timiskaming—Cochrane was a federal electoral district in Ontario that was represented in the House of Commons of Canada from 1997 to 2003. It was located in the northeast part of Ontario. This riding was created in 1996 from parts of Cochrane—Superior, Nipissing, Timiskaming—French River and Timmins—Chapleau ridings.

Timiskaming—Cochrane consisted of the Territorial District of Timiskaming excluding a portion including and to the west of the townships of Douglas and Geikie; the southeast part of the Territorial District of Cochrane; the eastern part of the Territorial District of Sudbury; and the northwest part of the Territorial District of Nipissing.

The electoral district was abolished in 2003 when it was redistributed between Nickel Belt, Nipissing—Timiskaming and Timmins-James Bay ridings.

== Members of Parliament ==
This riding has elected the following members of Parliament:

Parliament	Years	Member	Party
Riding created from Timiskaming—French River, Cochrane—Superior, Nipissing and Timmins—Chapleau
36th	1997–2000	Benoît Serré	Liberal
37th	2000–2004	Benoît Serré	Liberal
Riding dissolved into Nipissing—Timiskaming, Nickel Belt and Timmins-James Bay

== Electoral history ==
1997 Canadian federal election: Timiskaming—Cochrane
Party	Candidate	Votes	%	±%
Liberal	Benoît Serré	20,580		
Progressive Conservative	John Hodgson	4,886		
New Democratic	Marie-Jeanne Lacroix	4,623		
Reform	Norm Stewart	4,541		

2000 Canadian federal election: Timiskaming—Cochrane
Party	Candidate	Votes	%	±%
Liberal	Benoît Serré	19,403		
Alliance	Dan Louie	5,840		
Progressive Conservative	William J. Stairs	2,603		
New Democratic	Ambrose Raftis	2,461		
Green	Joseph Gold	790		

== See also ==
- List of Canadian electoral districts
- Historical federal electoral districts of Canada
