= Arnold Peters (politician) =

Canadian politician

- Official 1979 portrait

Member of Parliament for Timiskaming
- In office 1957–1980
- Preceded by: Ann Shipley
- Succeeded by: Bruce Lonsdale

Personal details
- Born: May 14, 1922 Uno Park, Ontario, Canada
- Died: September 17, 1996 (aged 74) Ottawa, Ontario, Canada
- Party: Co-operative Commonwealth Federation → New Democratic Party

William Arnold Peters (May 14, 1922 – September 17, 1996) was a Canadian politician. He represented the riding of Timiskaming in the House of Commons of Canada from 1957 to 1980. He was originally elected as a member of the Co-operative Commonwealth Federation, which became the New Democratic Party in 1961.

Peters, a hard rock miner and union organizer, served in the 124th Ferry Squadron in the Royal Canadian Air Force during World War II. He also ran in the 1953 election against Karl Eyre in the Timmins riding, but was not elected.

In Parliament, Peters and his caucus colleague Frank Howard were responsible for reforming Canada's divorce laws. In many provinces, divorce proceedings once had to be presented to Parliament for approval; Peters and Howard tried to show the ridiculousness of this by reading each divorce petition into the Commons record in great detail. Peters was also active in prison reform, and regularly lobbied for fairer treatment of non-unionized government employees. He also prepared a private member's bill in 1964 to decriminalize homosexuality in Canada, although the bill never made it to a vote in the House of Commons.

In the 1980 election, Peters was defeated by Liberal candidate Bruce Lonsdale. Lonsdale died in office just two years later; Peters ran again in the resulting by-election, but was not re-elected.

On September 19, 1996, two days after his death, tributes to Peters were delivered in the House of Commons by Bill Blaikie, Diane Marleau and Ed Harper.

== Electoral record ==
1953 Canadian federal election
Party	Candidate	Votes
Liberal	Karl EYRE	5,541
Co-operative Commonwealth	Arnold PETERS	4,686
Progressive Conservative	Maurice BÉLANGER	3,348
Labor–Progressive	Oscar ROY	369

1957 Canadian federal election
Party	Candidate	Votes
Co-operative Commonwealth	Arnold PETERS	6,936
Liberal	Ann SHIPLEY	6,896
Progressive Conservative	C. Foster RICE	5,645

1958 Canadian federal election
Party	Candidate	Votes
Co-operative Commonwealth	Arnold PETERS	7,544
Progressive Conservative	C. Foster RICE	7,318
Liberal	Ted J. MIRON	6,118

1962 Canadian federal election
Party	Candidate	Votes
New Democratic Party	Arnold PETERS	7,055
Progressive Conservative	Joseph MAVRINAC	6,053
Liberal	Ann SHIPLEY	5,969
Social Credit	Gérard MICHAUD	2,665

1963 Canadian federal election
Party	Candidate	Votes
New Democratic Party	Arnold PETERS	7,356
Liberal	Mervyn LAVIGNE	6,763
Progressive Conservative	John CRAM	5,540
Social Credit	Camil SAMSON	2,033

1965 Canadian federal election
Party	Candidate	Votes
New Democratic Party	Arnold PETERS	9,986
Liberal	Mervyn LAVIGNE	5,885
Progressive Conservative	Bruce BESLEY	3,823

1968 Canadian federal election
Party	Candidate	Votes
New Democratic Party	Arnold PETERS	8,482
Liberal	Louis-R. VANNIER	7,728
Progressive Conservative	George L. CASSIDY	4,443
Social Credit	Alcide-J. HAMELIN	288

1972 Canadian federal election
Party	Candidate	Votes
New Democratic Party	Arnold PETERS	11,327
Liberal	Dick DUFF	7,768
Progressive Conservative	Alf GUPPY	3,317
Social Credit	Albert BRETON	718

1974 Canadian federal election
Party	Candidate	Votes
New Democratic Party	Arnold PETERS	10,263
Liberal	Guy IANNUCCI	6,598
Progressive Conservative	Murray WATTS	4,615
Social Credit	Maurice CURE	492

1979 Canadian federal election: Timiskaming
Party	Candidate	Votes	%
New Democratic	Arnold Peters	11,595	40.64
Liberal	Pierre Bélanger	10,900	38.20
Progressive Conservative	Grant Sirola	6,036	21.16
Total valid votes		28,531	100.00
Total rejected ballots		149	
Turnout		28,680	77.40
Electors on the lists		37,053	
Source: Report of the Chief Electoral Officer, Thirty-first General Election, 1979.

1980 Canadian federal election
Party	Candidate	Votes
Liberal	Bruce LONSDALE	11,135
New Democratic Party	Arnold PETERS	10,661
Progressive Conservative	Grant SIROLA	4,901
Marxist–Leninist	Claudia IRONS	93

Canadian federal by-election, October 12, 1982: Timiskaming
Party	Candidate	Votes	%
Progressive Conservative	John MacDougall	9,029	35.74
Liberal	Pierre Bélanger	8,341	33.02
New Democratic	Arnold Peters	7,654	30.30
Independent	Richard Peever	236	0.93
Total valid votes		25,260	100.00
Total rejected ballots		111	
Turnout		25,371	69.00
Electors on the lists		36,771	
Called after Mr. Lonsdale's death.
