= Vyšná Jablonka =

- Municipality
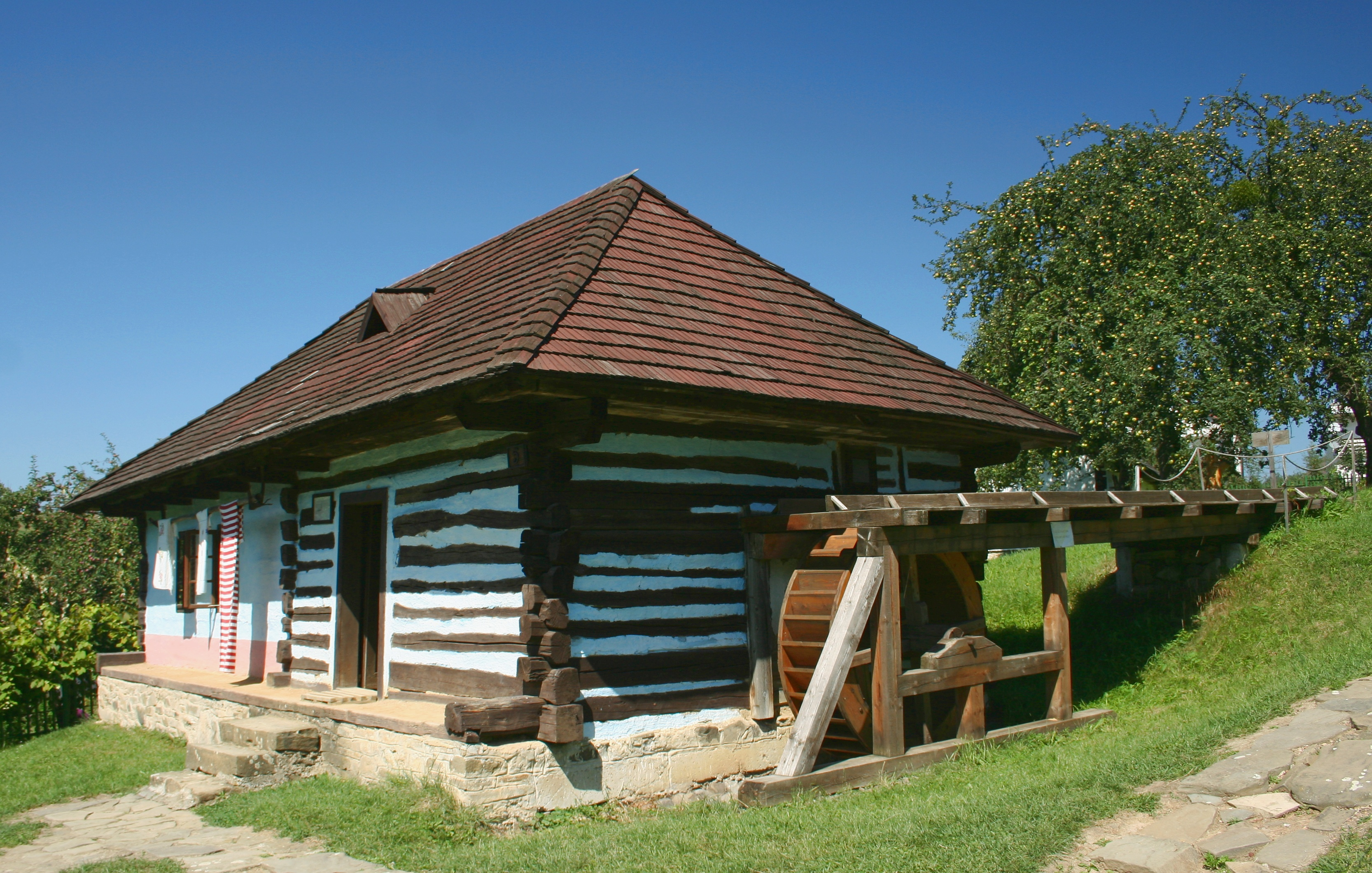

- Flag

- Location of Vyšná Jablonka in the Prešov Region Location of Vyšná Jablonka in Slovakia
- Coordinates: 49.15°N 22.12°E
- Country: Slovakia
- Region: Prešov Region
- District: Humenné District
- First mentioned: 1436

Area
  - Total: 24.83 km^{2} (9.59 sq mi)
- Elevation: 361 m (1,184 ft)

Population (2025)
  - Total: 51
- Time zone: UTC+1 (CET)
  - Summer (DST): UTC+2 (CEST)
- Postal code: 673 4
- Area code: +421 57
- Vehicle registration plate (until 2022): HE
- Website: vysnajablonka.sk

Vyšná Jablonka (Rusyn: Вышня Яблiнка; Hungarian: Felsőalmád) is a village and municipality in Humenné District in the Prešov Region of north-east Slovakia.

== History ==
The earliest mention of the village was in the "List of property" of the Lords of Humenne in 1436. From the beginning it was a foresters' village, what appeared until the present day. The fourth period mayor of the village is Emília Čopaková. From the nearly 700 inhabitants (1828 – 91 houses; 678 inhabitants) only 50 are now having their living place in Vyšná Jablonka. Once there used to be also a watermill, that you can nowadays see at the exposition of folk architecture of the Hummené museum.

== Second World War in Vyšná Jablonka ==
When the partisans withdrew, only two snipers, Šuhajda and Jacko remained. A short time afterwards, a German tank battalion came through the village and stampeded some horses. The two snipers went to catch them. While doing that they found four German rangers, who were unprepared, as they were full of bravado because of the tank battalion. After capturing the Germans, an important piece of information was found out from the feldwebel Otto Vilnes (one of the captured German soldiers), who said that the 82nd division will take the positions at the Low Beskyds on 26 December, with the mission to hold the line until the new and fresh 254th infantry division will come.

The Partisan Brigade "Sergej" decided to hold the line from the 82nd division group until the arrival of the Red Army.

On 26 December the Germans crossed Vyšná Jablonka and at the "Lukovsky Slip" they were defeated by the Partisans.

== Orthodox Church ==
The village's first Orthodox church was probably built in the 16th century. It definitely existed in the 17th century, since the first record about the church is from the year 1623, written by the resident priest. In folk tales, it is said that he stayed in the Potok slum. Through the efforts of Empress Maria Theresa, the Orthodox in this area became united with Rome with the Union of Uzhhorod in 1646. Any church built in this village would have been Greek Catholic, not Orthodox. The church remained Greek Catholic until the Communists outlawed the Greek Catholic Church and forced Orthodoxy on the people.

The present-day church is located in the lower part of the village, at the western hill. Its construction is dated to the year 1766. In the landlord records from Hummené it was first mentioned in 1880. In the year 1998, the church went to the Greek Catholic Church. The orthodox votaries had to have their masses in one room at the local municipal office.

== Geography ==
The village is in the northeast of Slovakia among the Low Beskyds of the Laborec Highlands. It is situated close to the river Rieka which is 3 km (ca. 1.4 miles) away. The municipality lies at an altitude of 361 metres (1,184 ft) and covers an area of 24.83 km^{2} (9.59 sq mi) (2025). The settlement has the highest elevation in the Humenné district. The next biggest cities being Humenné, Snina and Medzilaborce, 32 km, 25 km and 24 km away, respectively.

== Population ==
Population statistic (10 years)
Year	1995	2005	2015	2025
Count	100	63	54	51
Difference		−37%	−14.28%	−5.55%

Population statistic
Year	2024	2025
Count	52	51
Difference		−1.92%

It has a population of 51 people (31 December 2025).

=== Ethnicity ===
Census 2021 (1+ %)
Ethnicity	Number	Fraction
Rusyn	32	62.74%
Slovak	28	54.9%
Not found out	6	11.76%
Ukrainian	3	5.88%
Total	51	

In year 2021 was 51 people by ethnicity 32 as Rusyn, 28 as Slovak, 6 as Not found out and 3 as Ukrainian.

Note on population: The difference values of population numbers in the table "Population statistic" and in the sections "Ethnicity" & "Religion" is caused by the use of various statistical methods.

=== Religion ===
Census 2021 (1+ %)
Religion	Number	Fraction
Eastern Orthodox Church	32	62.75%
Not found out	6	11.76%
Greek Catholic Church	6	11.76%
Roman Catholic Church	5	9.8%
None	2	3.92%
Total	51	

In year 2021 was 51 people by religion 32 from Eastern Orthodox Church, 6 from Not found out, 6 from Greek Catholic Church, 5 from Roman Catholic Church and 2 from None.

== Flora & fauna ==
The village lies in the northern territories of Slovakia. The population of animals depends on the situation. There is a population of wolves (canis lupus), brown bears (ursus arctos), foxes and lynx. They hunt the local deer...
