= Ray Chénier =

Canadian politician

Jacques Raymond (Ray) Chénier (born August 7, 1935, in Hanmer, Ontario; died November 2, 2022, in Timmins, Ontario) was a Canadian politician, who represented the electoral district of Timmins—Chapleau in the House of Commons of Canada from 1979 to 1984. He was a member of the Liberal Party.

Chénier served as parliamentary secretary to John Munro, the Minister of Indian Affairs and Northern Development, from 1980 to 1982.

He did not stand for reelection in the 1984 election.

He subsequently stood as the Liberal candidate for Timmins—James Bay in the 2004 federal election following the retirement of Liberal MP Réginald Bélair, but came second behind Charlie Angus of the New Democratic Party and as such was not reelected to the House.

Parliament of Canada
Preceded by first member, riding created in 1976	Member of Parliament for Timmins—Chapleau; 1979–1984	Succeeded by Aurèle Gervais
