= Bruce Lonsdale =

Canadian politician

Member of Parliament for Timiskaming
- In office April 14, 1980 – January 22, 1982
- Preceded by: Arnold Peters
- Succeeded by: John MacDougall

Mayor of Cobalt
- In office 1977–1980

Personal details
- Born: November 10, 1949 Cobalt, Ontario, Canada
- Died: January 22, 1982 (aged 32) Nipissing District, Ontario, Canada
- Party: Liberal
- Children: 3

Bruce Lonsdale (November 10, 1949 – January 22, 1982) was a Canadian politician. He represented the riding of Timiskaming in the House of Commons of Canada from 1980 until his death two years later. He was a member of the Liberal Party.

In 1973, Lonsdale was elected to the council of his hometown of Cobalt. He served as mayor from 1977 to 1980, before seeking the Liberal nomination for the federal riding of Timiskaming.

On the evening of January 22, 1982, Lonsdale died in a head-on collision on Highway 17, about 10 kilometers west of North Bay. He was 32 years old.

Lonsdale was married and had three children.
