= John MacDougall (Ontario politician) =

Canadian politician

Member of Parliament for Timiskaming
- In office 1982–1993
- Preceded by: Bruce Lonsdale
- Succeeded by: Benoît Serré

Personal details
- Born: April 20, 1947 (age 78) Port Hood, Nova Scotia
- Party: Progressive Conservative

John Alexander Frances MacDougall (born April 20, 1947 in Port Hood, Nova Scotia) is a former Canadian politician. He represented the riding of Timiskaming in the House of Commons of Canada from 1982 to 1993, as a member of the Progressive Conservative Party.

He first entered Parliament in 1982, in a byelection following the death of the riding's prior MP, Bruce Lonsdale.

On April 23, 1993, MacDougall became the centre of controversy when he made comments in the House of Commons attacking Sunera Thobani, the new head of the National Action Committee on the Status of Women:

Earlier today I learned that [Thobani] first is not a Canadian, and second does not have a work permit for this country. Does the Deputy Prime Minister believe that the taxpayers of Canada should be funding such an organization with an illegal immigrant as its head?

Thobani, in fact, had just received her landed immigrant status.

MacDougall did not run for reelection in the 1993 election.
