= Walter Little (politician) =

Canadian politician

Walter Little (March 25, 1877 – May 31, 1961) was a Canadian politician. He represented the riding of Timiskaming in the House of Commons of Canada from 1935 to 1953. He was a member of the Liberal Party until his death in 1961.
