= Timiskaming South =

Former federal electoral district in Ontario, Canada

Ontario electoral district

Defunct federal electoral district
- Legislature: House of Commons
- District created: 1924
- District abolished: 1933
- First contested: 1925
- Last contested: 1930 by-election

Timiskaming South was a Canadian electoral district represented in the House of Commons of Canada from 1925 to 1935. It was located in the northeastern part of the province of Ontario. It was created in 1924 from parts of Nipissing and Timiskaming ridings.

It consisted of the southern portion of Timiskaming District, along with portions of Nipissing District and Sudbury District.

The electoral district was abolished in 1933 when it was redistributed between Nipissing and Timiskaming ridings.

== Members of Parliament ==
This riding has elected the following members of Parliament:

Parliament	Years	Member	Party
Riding created from Timiskaming and Nipissing
15th	1925–1926	Ernest Frederick Armstrong	Conservative
16th	1926–1930	Malcolm Lang	Labour
17th	1930–1930	Wesley Ashton Gordon	Conservative
17th	1930–1935	Wesley Ashton Gordon	Conservative
Riding dissolved into Timiskaming and Nipissing

== Election history ==
1925 Canadian federal election: Timiskaming South
Party	Candidate	Votes	%	±%
Conservative	Ernest Frederick Armstrong	5,362		
Labour	Malcolm Lang	4,558		
Labour	Harold Milton Tremaine Welch	1,882		

1926 Canadian federal election: Timiskaming South
Party	Candidate	Votes	%	±%
Labour	Malcolm Lang	7,309		
Conservative	Ernest Frederick Armstrong	6,411		

1930 Canadian federal election: Timiskaming South
Party	Candidate	Votes	%	±%
Conservative	Wesley Ashton Gordon	8,729		
Liberal–Labour	Malcolm Lang	7,195		

By-election: On Mr. Gordon being appointed Minister of Immigration and Colonization and Minister of Mines, 25 August 1930: Timiskaming South
Party	Candidate	Votes	%	±%
Conservative	Hon. Wesley Ashton Gordon	acclaimed		

== See also ==
- List of Canadian electoral districts
- Historical federal electoral districts of Canada
