= Timiskaming (federal electoral district) =

Former federal electoral district in Ontario, Canada

Ontario electoral district

Defunct federal electoral district
- Legislature: House of Commons
- District created: 1914, 1933
- District abolished: 1924, 1987
- First contested: 1917
- Last contested: 1984

Timiskaming (later known as Timiskaming—French River) was a federal electoral district in the northeastern part of Ontario, Canada, that was represented in the House of Commons of Canada from 1917 to 1925, and from 1935 to 1997.

It was created in 1914 from parts of Algoma East and Nipissing ridings.

== Territorial evolution ==
The riding generally covered the Timiskaming District, but also incorporated parts of Nipissing District, Sudbury District, Algoma District and Cochrane District at various times.

In 1914, it consisted of the whole of the territorial district of Timiskaming and part of the territorial district of Algoma.

The electoral district was abolished in 1924 when it was divided into Timiskaming North and Timiskaming South ridings.

In 1933, the two ridings were re-united, and the new Timiskaming riding consisted of the territorial district of Timiskaming (excluding the township of Keefer and all townships east of Keefer and adjacent to the north boundary of Timiskaming district); and part of the territorial district of Nipissing. In 1947 and 1952, it was redefined to consist of the southern part of Timiskaming.

In 1966, it was redefined to consist of parts of the territorial districts of Timiskaming, Sudbury and Nipissing. In 1976, it was redefined to consist of the southeastern part of the Territorial District of Cochrane, the northern part of the Territorial District of Nipissing; and the Territorial District of Timiskaming (excluding that part lying westerly of the Townships of Cleaver and Fallon).

In 1987, it was redefined to consist of the southeastern part of the Territorial District of Cochrane; the northern part of the Territorial District of Nipissing; the eastern part of the Territorial District of Sudbury; and the Territorial District of Timiskaming (excluding the part lying west of the west boundary of the geographic Townships of Cleaver and Fallon.)

The electoral district was renamed in 1993 to "Timiskaming—French River", and abolished in 1996 when it was incorporated into Timiskaming—Cochrane riding.

== Members of Parliament ==
Parliament	Years	Member	Party
Timiskaming; Riding created from Nipissing and Algoma East
13th	1917–1919†	Francis Cochrane	Government (Unionist)
13th	1920–1921	Angus McDonald	Independent
14th	1921–1925	Angus McDonald	Independent
Riding dissolved into Timiskaming North and Timiskaming South
Timiskaming; Riding re-created from Timiskaming North and Timiskaming South
18th	1935–1940	Walter Little	Liberal
19th	1940–1945	Walter Little	Liberal
20th	1945–1949	Walter Little	Liberal
21st	1949–1953	Walter Little	Liberal
22nd	1953–1957	Ann Shipley	Liberal
23rd	1957–1958	Arnold Peters	Co-operative Commonwealth
24th	1958–1961	Arnold Peters	Co-operative Commonwealth
24th	1961–1962	Arnold Peters	New Democratic
25th	1962–1963	Arnold Peters	New Democratic
26th	1963–1965	Arnold Peters	New Democratic
27th	1965–1968	Arnold Peters	New Democratic
28th	1968–1972	Arnold Peters	New Democratic
29th	1972–1974	Arnold Peters	New Democratic
30th	1974–1979	Arnold Peters	New Democratic
31st	1979–1980	Arnold Peters	New Democratic
32nd	1980–1982†	Bruce Lonsdale	Liberal
32nd	1982–1984	John MacDougall	Progressive Conservative
33rd	1984–1988	John MacDougall	Progressive Conservative
34th	1988–1993	John MacDougall	Progressive Conservative
Timiskaming—French River
35th	1993–1997	Benoît Serré	Liberal
Riding dissolved into Timiskaming—Cochrane

== Election results ==
=== Timiskaming, 1917–1925 ===
1917 Canadian federal election
Party	Candidate	Votes
Government (Unionist)	Francis Cochrane	7,025
Opposition	Arthur Roebuck	4,868

By-election: On Mr. Cochrane's death, 7 April 1920
Party	Candidate	Votes	%	±%
Independent	Angus McDonald	5,797		
Liberal	Arthur Graeme Slaght	3,090		
Independent Conservative	Ernest Fleetwood Pullen	2,996		

1921 Canadian federal election
Party	Candidate	Votes
Independent	Angus McDonald	5,797
Liberal	Donald McEachren	5,703
Conservative	Angus John Kennedy	5,130
Independent	David Bertrand	197

=== Timiskaming, 1935–1993 ===
1935 Canadian federal election
Party	Candidate	Votes
Liberal	Walter Little	5,905
Conservative	Wesley Ashton Gordon	5,456
Co-operative Commonwealth	Walter John Hill	4,185
Reconstruction	Jack Percy Dransfield	168

1940 Canadian federal election
Party	Candidate	Votes
Liberal	Walter Little	10,455
Liberal	Gerald Daniel O'Meara	4,906
Farmer–Labour	Tommy Church	4,204
Co-operative Commonwealth	Walter John Hill	2,481
Unknown	Albert Edward Swift	110

1945 Canadian federal election
Party	Candidate	Votes
Liberal	Walter Little	7,818
Co-operative Commonwealth	Colborne Campbell Ames	6,330
Progressive Conservative	Frank Herbert Todd	4,373
Labor–Progressive	William Garth Teeple	565

1949 Canadian federal election
Party	Candidate	Votes
Liberal	Walter Little	8,528
Co-operative Commonwealth	Colborne Campbell Ames	6,961
Progressive Conservative	John Fenton Richardson Akehurst	5,512

1953 Canadian federal election
Party	Candidate	Votes
Liberal	Ann Shipley	7,497
Co-operative Commonwealth	Colbert Campbell Ames	6,259
Progressive Conservative	Ted Kenrick	4,611
Labor–Progressive	Joseph Billings	335

1957 Canadian federal election
Party	Candidate	Votes
Co-operative Commonwealth	Arnold Peters	6,936
Liberal	Ann Shipley	6,896
Progressive Conservative	C. Foster Rice	5,645

1958 Canadian federal election
Party	Candidate	Votes
Co-operative Commonwealth	Arnold Peters	7,544
Progressive Conservative	C. Foster Rice	7,318
Liberal	Ted J. Miron	6,118

1962 Canadian federal election
Party	Candidate	Votes
New Democratic	Arnold Peters	7,055
Progressive Conservative	Joseph Mavrinac	6,053
Liberal	Ann Shipley	5,969
Social Credit	Gérard Michaud	2,665

1963 Canadian federal election
Party	Candidate	Votes
New Democratic	Arnold Peters	7,356
Liberal	Mervyn Lavigne	6,763
Progressive Conservative	John Cram	5,540
Social Credit	Camil Samson	2,033

1965 Canadian federal election
Party	Candidate	Votes
New Democratic	Arnold Peters	9,986
Liberal	Mervyn Lavigne	5,885
Progressive Conservative	Bruce Besley	3,823

1968 Canadian federal election
Party	Candidate	Votes
New Democratic	Arnold Peters	8,482
Liberal	Louis-R. Vannier	7,728
Progressive Conservative	George L. Cassidy	4,443
Social Credit	Alcide-J. Hamelin	288

1972 Canadian federal election
Party	Candidate	Votes
New Democratic	Arnold Peters	11,327
Liberal	Dick Duff	7,768
Progressive Conservative	Alf Guppy	3,317
Social Credit	Albert Breton	718

1974 Canadian federal election
Party	Candidate	Votes
New Democratic	Arnold Peters	10,263
Liberal	Guy Iannucci	6,598
Progressive Conservative	Murray Watts	4,615
Social Credit	Maurice Cure	492

1979 Canadian federal election
Party	Candidate	Votes
New Democratic	Arnold Peters	11,595
Liberal	Pierre Belanger	10,900
Progressive Conservative	Grant Sirola	6,036

1980 Canadian federal election
Party	Candidate	Votes
Liberal	Bruce Lonsdale	11,135
New Democratic	Arnold Peters	10,661
Progressive Conservative	Grant Sirola	4,901
Marxist–Leninist	Claudia Irons	93

Canadian federal by-election, October 12, 1982: Timiskaming
Party	Candidate	Votes	%
Progressive Conservative	John MacDougall	9,029	35.74
Liberal	Pierre Bélanger	8,341	33.02
New Democratic	Arnold Peters	7,654	30.30
Independent	Richard Peever	236	0.93
Total valid votes		25,260	100.00
Total rejected ballots		111	
Turnout		25,371	69.00
Electors on the lists		36,771	
Called after Mr. Lonsdale's death.

1984 Canadian federal election
Party	Candidate	Votes
Progressive Conservative	John MacDougall	15,359
New Democratic	Jim Morrison	6,685
Liberal	Lorraine Robazza	6,308
Social Credit	Ken Sweigard	151

1988 Canadian federal election
Party	Candidate	Votes
Progressive Conservative	John MacDougall	11,230
Liberal	Ben Serré	10,284
New Democratic	Earl Evans	7,831
Confederation of Regions	Fred Field	1,207
Independent	Richard Peever	160

=== Timiskaming—French River, 1993–1997 ===
1993 Canadian federal election
Party	Candidate	Votes
Liberal	Ben Serré	17,462
Progressive Conservative	Bob Mantha	4,510
Reform	Dan Louie	3,868
New Democratic Party	Steve Yee	2,573
Independent	Gary Whitman	483
Natural Law	Anne Belanger	296

== See also ==
- List of Canadian electoral districts
- Historical federal electoral districts of Canada
