= Results of the 1980 Canadian federal election =

1984 election for members of the Canadian Parliament's House of Commons

1980 Canadian federal election
- February 18, 1980
- All 282 seats in the House of Commons of Canada; 142 seats needed for a majority
- Turnout: 69.3%
Party	Leader	Vote %	Seats	+/–
Liberal	Pierre Trudeau	44.34%	147	+33
Progressive Conservative	Joe Clark	32.45%	103	−33
New Democratic	Ed Broadbent	19.77%	32	+6
This lists parties that won seats. See the complete results below.
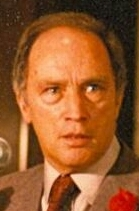
Prime Minister before	Prime Minister after
Joe Clark; Progressive Conservative	Pierre Trudeau; Liberal

The 1980 Canadian federal election was held on February 18, 1980, to elect members of the House of Commons of Canada of the 32nd Parliament of Canada. It was called when the minority Progressive Conservative government led by Prime Minister Joe Clark was defeated in the Commons over the budget it had presented.

Former Liberal Prime Minister Pierre Trudeau, who had served since 1968, had announced his resignation as leader of the Liberal Party following its defeat in 1979. However, no leadership convention had been held when Clark's Progressive Conservative government fell. Taking into consideration the forthcoming 1980 Quebec referendum (and correctly presuming that he would be seen as a more effective spokesman for the federal case), Trudeau quickly rescinded his resignation and led the party to victory, winning 33 more seats than in 1979 and obtaining a majority of the seats available in the Maritimes and Ontario. Together with its dominance in Quebec (taking 74 of the 75 seats), that enabled the Liberals to form a majority government. They were shut out of seats west of Manitoba.

The Tories lost one of their two Quebec seats: Roch La Salle held on in Joliette, while Heward Grafftey was defeated in Missisquoi. Pat Carney would register the only gain for the party, winning in Vancouver Centre. The PCs would retain 103 MPs, but all but 14 of them were elected in ridings west of Quebec.

The NDP received a small gain in seats, from the Prairies and BC.

In 1980 Social Credit saw its fortunes drop dramatically:

Social Credit presence in elections (1980 vs 1979)
Province	Candidates			Votes		
Province	1980	1979	+/-	1980	1979	+/-
Alberta	15	9	6	8,158	8,164	(6)
BC	5	3	2	1,763	1,885	(122)
Manitoba		4	(4)		1,044	(1,044)
Ontario	5	5	–	804	1,002	(198)
Quebec	55	74	(19)	174,583	512,995	(338,412)
Saskatchewan	1	8	(7)	178	2,514	(2,336)
Total	81	103	(22)	185,486	527,604	(342,118)
% change			-21.36%			-64.84%

For the first time since 1958, it had no representation in the House. Richard Janelle (Lotbinière) attempted (but failed) to salvage his fortunes by crossing the floor to the PCs. Social Credit would never win seats again, and was deregistered in 1993.

Swings tended to point in favour of the Liberals nationwide, with the exception of notable strength for the NDP in Manitoba, Saskatchewan and BC.

== Results analysis ==
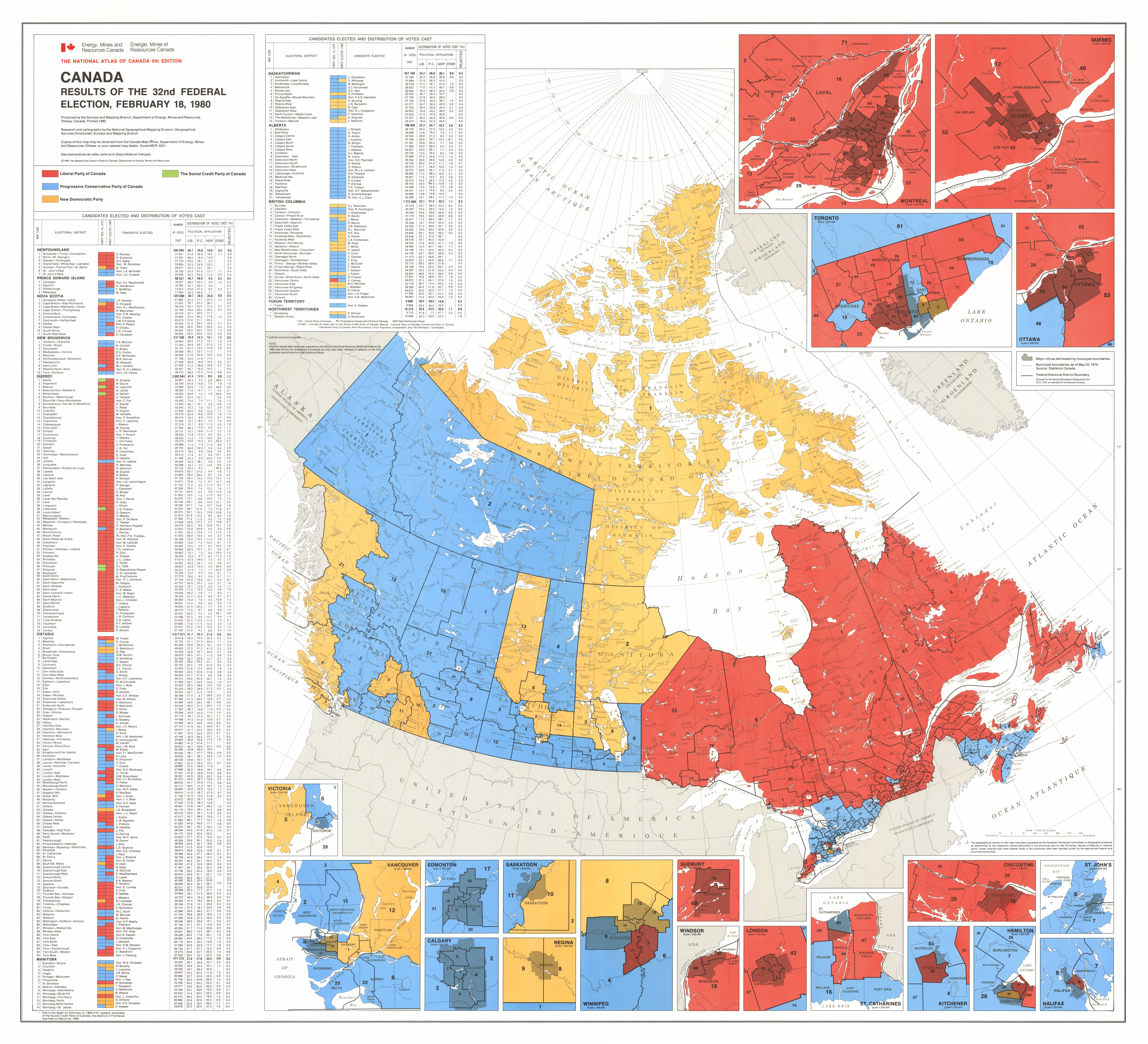
Map of Canada, showing the results of the 1980 election by riding.

=== Detailed analysis ===
Change in popular vote by party (1980 vs 1979)
Party	1980	1979	Change (pp)
█ Liberal	44.34%	40.11%	4.23
█ Progressive Conservative	32.44%	35.89%	-3.45
█ New Democratic	19.77%	17.88%	1.89
█ Social Credit	1.69%	4.61%	-2.92
█ Rhinoceros	1.01%	0.54%	0.47
█ Union populaire	0.13%	0.17%	-0.04
█ Other	0.62%	0.87%	-0.25

Party candidates in 2nd place
Party in 1st place	1980						1979					
Party in 1st place	Party in 2nd place (Note: Liberals and PCs tied for second place in Beaches.)					Total	Party in 2nd place					Total
Party in 1st place	Lib	PC	NDP	SC	Rhino	Total	Lib	PC	NDP	SC	Ind	Total
Liberal		77	60	8	2	147		56	20	37	1	114
Progressive Conservative	81		22			103	104		31		1	136
New Democratic	10	23				33	10	16				26
Social Credit						–	6					6
Total	91	100	82	8	2	283	120	72	51	37	2	282

Principal races, according to 1st and 2nd-place results
Parties		Seats
█ Liberal	█ Progressive Conservative	158
█ Liberal	█ New Democratic	70
█ Progressive Conservative	█ New Democratic	45
█ Liberal	█ Social Credit	8
█ Liberal	█ Rhinoceros	2
Total		283

Party rankings (1st to 5th place)
Party	1984					1980				
Party	1st	2nd	3rd	4th	5th	1st	2nd	3rd	4th	5th
Liberal	147	91	44			114	120	48		
Progressive Conservative	103	100	74	5		136	72	66	8	
New Democratic	32	82	157	6	3	26	51	145	49	10
Social Credit		8	5	35	51	6	37	20	35	5
Rhinoceros		2	1	82	30			1	7	49
Communist			14	16	6			21	23	8
Libertarian				37	17				48	3
Independent				33	24		2	2	29	15
Marxist–Leninist				27	52				15	44
Union populaire				6	5					14

=== Seats that changed hands ===
Elections to the 32nd Parliament of Canada – seats won/lost by party, 1979–1980
Party	1979	Gain from (loss to)								1980
Party	1979	Lib		PC		NDP		SC		1980
Liberal	114			23	(1)	5		6		147
Progressive Conservative	136	1	(23)				(11)			103
New Democratic	26		(5)	11						32
Social Credit	6		(6)							–
Total	282	1	(34)	34	(1)	5	(11)	6	–	282

== Synopsis of results ==
1980 Canadian federal election – synopsis of riding results
Electoral district		Winning party								Votes (Note: Sorted in order of national vote share.)										
Province	Name	1979	1st place	Votes	Share	Margin #	Margin %	2nd place	3rd place	Lib	PC	NDP	SC	Rhino	MLP	Ltn	UP	Comm	Ind	Total
AB	Athabasca	PC	PC	13,287	44.66%	3,465	11.65%	Lib	NDP	9,822	13,287	4,218	463	–	–	–	–	–	1,960	29,750
AB	Bow River	PC	PC	30,463	76.60%	24,613	61.89%	Lib	NDP	5,850	30,463	2,802	656	–	–	–	–	–	–	39,771
AB	Calgary Centre	PC	PC	18,610	57.39%	8,912	27.48%	Lib	NDP	9,698	18,610	2,994	257	766	43	–	–	58	–	32,426
AB	Calgary East	PC	PC	23,073	52.84%	11,411	26.13%	Lib	NDP	11,662	23,073	4,490	422	638	55	–	–	58	3,271	43,669
AB	Calgary North	PC	PC	26,201	63.42%	15,512	37.55%	Lib	NDP	10,689	26,201	3,180	318	878	46	–	–	–	–	41,312
AB	Calgary South	PC	PC	34,873	68.12%	23,119	45.16%	Lib	NDP	11,754	34,873	2,812	305	887	34	–	–	–	527	51,192
AB	Calgary West	PC	PC	26,639	65.85%	17,300	42.77%	Lib	NDP	9,339	26,639	3,107	294	1,027	45	–	–	–	–	40,451
AB	Crowfoot	PC	PC	23,491	76.61%	18,730	61.09%	Lib	NDP	4,761	23,491	1,912	498	–	–	–	–	–	–	30,662
AB	Edmonton East	PC	PC	14,840	53.89%	7,234	26.27%	Lib	NDP	7,606	14,840	4,763	187	–	57	–	–	84	–	27,537
AB	Edmonton North	PC	PC	21,442	58.98%	11,746	32.31%	Lib	NDP	9,696	21,442	5,107	–	–	112	–	–	–	–	36,357
AB	Edmonton South	PC	PC	24,839	61.07%	14,166	34.83%	Lib	NDP	10,673	24,839	4,772	–	–	70	–	–	–	318	40,672
AB	Edmonton West	PC	PC	18,730	56.23%	8,731	26.21%	Lib	NDP	9,999	18,730	3,886	–	–	59	–	–	–	633	33,307
AB	Edmonton—Strathcona	PC	PC	23,920	59.38%	12,982	32.23%	Lib	NDP	10,938	23,920	4,837	–	453	31	–	–	106	–	40,285
AB	Lethbridge—Foothills	PC	PC	27,307	68.60%	20,425	51.31%	Lib	NDP	6,882	27,307	3,974	1,031	–	–	–	–	132	482	39,808
AB	Medicine Hat	PC	PC	25,908	70.32%	19,446	52.78%	Lib	NDP	6,462	25,908	3,453	1,022	–	–	–	–	–	–	36,845
AB	Peace River	PC	PC	18,953	59.35%	12,710	39.80%	Lib	NDP	6,243	18,953	5,436	462	547	–	–	–	–	291	31,932
AB	Pembina	PC	PC	31,490	64.69%	20,026	41.14%	Lib	NDP	11,464	31,490	5,260	465	–	–	–	–	–	–	48,679
AB	Red Deer	PC	PC	31,758	74.75%	25,578	60.20%	Lib	NDP	6,180	31,758	3,345	1,203	–	–	–	–	–	–	42,486
AB	Vegreville	PC	PC	25,682	74.81%	21,309	62.07%	Lib	NDP	4,373	25,682	3,172	575	359	–	–	–	170	–	34,331
AB	Wetaskiwin	PC	PC	26,620	74.98%	21,412	60.31%	Lib	NDP	5,208	26,620	3,673	–	–	–	–	–	–	–	35,501
AB	Yellowhead	PC	PC	27,953	69.47%	20,651	51.32%	Lib	NDP	7,302	27,953	4,562	–	–	–	–	–	–	419	40,236
BC	Burnaby	NDP	NDP	21,587	42.43%	2,968	5.83%	PC	Lib	10,585	18,619	21,587	–	–	81	–	–	–	–	50,872
BC	Capilano	PC	PC	26,327	59.36%	15,484	34.91%	Lib	NDP	10,843	26,327	6,495	–	688	–	–	–	–	–	44,353
BC	Cariboo—Chilcotin	PC	PC	12,355	40.75%	2,063	6.80%	NDP	Lib	7,577	12,355	10,292	–	–	92	–	–	–	–	30,316
BC	Comox—Powell River	NDP	NDP	25,007	48.97%	8,462	16.57%	PC	Lib	9,221	16,545	25,007	–	–	–	–	–	292	–	51,065
BC	Cowichan—Malahat—The Islands	PC	NDP	22,154	48.16%	4,001	8.70%	PC	Lib	5,161	18,153	22,154	–	444	–	–	–	85	–	45,997
BC	Esquimalt—Saanich	PC	PC	24,961	45.02%	5,846	10.54%	NDP	Lib	10,043	24,961	19,115	–	548	–	–	–	–	776	55,443
BC	Fraser Valley East	PC	PC	21,989	49.71%	11,294	25.53%	NDP	Lib	9,490	21,989	10,695	–	–	–	–	–	–	2,057	44,231
BC	Fraser Valley West	PC	PC	25,770	50.62%	9,202	18.08%	NDP	Lib	8,483	25,770	16,568	–	–	83	–	–	–	–	50,904
BC	Kamloops—Shuswap	PC	NDP	17,896	39.10%	1,850	4.04%	PC	Lib	11,588	16,046	17,896	–	237	–	–	–	–	–	45,767
BC	Kootenay East—Revelstoke	PC	NDP	13,299	39.87%	631	1.89%	PC	Lib	7,386	12,668	13,299	–	–	–	–	–	–	–	33,353
BC	Kootenay West	PC	NDP	12,232	43.04%	815	2.87%	PC	Lib	4,769	11,417	12,232	–	–	–	–	–	–	–	28,418
BC	Mission—Port Moody	NDP	NDP	23,224	47.19%	5,509	11.20%	PC	Lib	7,762	17,715	23,224	358	–	–	–	–	150	–	49,209
BC	Nanaimo—Alberni	NDP	NDP	24,082	49.20%	7,042	14.39%	PC	Lib	6,994	17,040	24,082	–	591	69	–	–	173	–	48,949
BC	New Westminster—Coquitlam	NDP	NDP	19,498	46.42%	5,177	12.32%	PC	Lib	8,041	14,321	19,498	–	–	–	–	–	147	–	42,007
BC	North Vancouver—Burnaby	PC	PC	16,774	38.10%	1,467	3.33%	Lib	NDP	15,307	16,774	11,820	88	–	38	–	–	–	–	44,027
BC	Okanagan North	PC	PC	24,983	48.70%	10,039	19.57%	NDP	Lib	11,368	24,983	14,944	–	–	–	–	–	–	–	51,295
BC	Okanagan—Similkameen	PC	PC	19,161	45.02%	6,103	14.34%	NDP	Lib	9,433	19,161	13,058	593	317	–	–	–	–	–	42,562
BC	Prince George—Bulkley Valley	PC	PC	12,640	39.48%	2,414	7.54%	NDP	Lib	9,147	12,640	10,226	–	–	–	–	–	–	–	32,013
BC	Prince George—Peace River	PC	PC	13,593	52.10%	6,758	25.90%	NDP	Lib	5,044	13,593	6,835	620	–	–	–	–	–	–	26,092
BC	Richmond—South Delta	PC	PC	29,192	51.98%	15,586	27.75%	NDP	Lib	13,134	29,192	13,606	–	–	61	–	–	170	–	56,163
BC	Skeena	NDP	NDP	13,280	49.52%	6,139	22.89%	Lib	PC	7,141	6,191	13,280	–	–	–	–	–	–	205	26,817
BC	Surrey—White Rock—North Delta	PC	PC	28,151	48.92%	9,100	15.81%	NDP	Lib	9,759	28,151	19,051	–	440	65	–	–	82	–	57,548
BC	Vancouver Centre	Lib	PC	16,462	35.27%	1,632	3.50%	NDP	Lib	14,667	16,462	14,830	–	337	24	–	–	200	155	46,675
BC	Vancouver East	NDP	NDP	14,245	43.91%	1,266	3.90%	Lib	PC	12,979	4,742	14,245	–	198	34	–	–	179	61	32,438
BC	Vancouver Kingsway	NDP	NDP	16,928	46.85%	5,974	16.53%	Lib	PC	10,954	7,924	16,928	–	–	63	–	–	149	113	36,131
BC	Vancouver Quadra	PC	PC	20,993	46.09%	7,006	15.38%	Lib	NDP	13,987	20,993	9,907	104	405	50	–	–	–	99	45,545
BC	Vancouver South	PC	PC	22,288	53.28%	12,034	28.77%	Lib	NDP	10,254	22,288	8,896	–	327	63	–	–	–	–	41,828
BC	Victoria	PC	PC	25,068	50.34%	7,980	16.03%	NDP	Lib	7,145	25,068	17,088	–	446	47	–	–	–	–	49,794
MB	Brandon—Souris	PC	PC	16,098	46.87%	6,437	18.74%	Lib	NDP	9,661	16,098	8,509	–	–	76	–	–	–	–	34,344
MB	Churchill	NDP	NDP	10,319	43.27%	3,227	13.53%	Lib	PC	7,092	6,084	10,319	–	352	–	–	–	–	–	23,847
MB	Dauphin	PC	NDP	12,960	44.81%	1,844	6.38%	PC	Lib	4,849	11,116	12,960	–	–	–	–	–	–	–	28,925
MB	Lisgar	PC	PC	18,057	62.65%	11,041	38.31%	Lib	NDP	7,016	18,057	3,353	–	–	–	–	–	–	396	28,822
MB	Portage—Marquette	PC	PC	16,219	53.03%	8,998	29.42%	NDP	Lib	6,973	16,219	7,221	–	–	174	–	–	–	–	30,587
MB	Provencher	PC	PC	14,677	44.94%	5,396	16.52%	NDP	Lib	8,271	14,677	9,281	–	433	–	–	–	–	–	32,662
MB	Selkirk—Interlake	NDP	NDP	15,055	45.69%	3,208	9.74%	PC	Lib	5,953	11,847	15,055	–	–	97	–	–	–	–	32,952
MB	St. Boniface	Lib	Lib	20,076	45.25%	7,032	15.85%	PC	NDP	20,076	13,044	11,191	–	–	57	–	–	–	–	44,368
MB	Winnipeg North	NDP	NDP	18,561	50.53%	9,044	24.62%	Lib	PC	9,517	8,313	18,561	–	–	149	–	–	195	–	36,735
MB	Winnipeg North Centre	NDP	NDP	12,637	57.00%	7,461	33.65%	Lib	PC	5,176	4,113	12,637	–	–	69	–	–	176	–	22,171
MB	Winnipeg—Assiniboine	PC	PC	22,160	49.10%	6,736	14.92%	Lib	NDP	15,424	22,160	7,304	–	–	45	–	–	–	201	45,134
MB	Winnipeg—Birds Hill	NDP	NDP	24,672	54.27%	11,287	24.83%	PC	Lib	7,020	13,385	24,672	–	322	60	–	–	–	–	45,459
MB	Winnipeg—Fort Garry	Lib	Lib	18,694	46.35%	4,840	12.00%	PC	NDP	18,694	13,854	7,293	–	405	90	–	–	–	–	40,336
MB	Winnipeg—St. James	PC	NDP	11,078	37.47%	438	1.48%	PC	Lib	7,531	10,640	11,078	–	236	77	–	–	–	–	29,562
NB	Carleton—Charlotte	PC	PC	14,565	47.38%	3,474	11.30%	Lib	NDP	11,091	14,565	4,680	–	–	–	–	–	–	407	30,743
NB	Fundy—Royal	PC	PC	16,805	40.84%	1,608	3.91%	Lib	NDP	15,197	16,805	8,668	–	–	–	–	–	–	480	41,150
NB	Gloucester	Lib	Lib	22,229	63.67%	15,383	44.06%	PC	NDP	22,229	6,846	4,484	–	1,098	59	–	–	–	197	34,913
NB	Madawaska—Victoria	Lib	Lib	17,190	65.83%	11,211	42.93%	PC	NDP	17,190	5,979	2,943	–	–	–	–	–	–	–	26,112
NB	Moncton	Lib	Lib	22,365	47.96%	6,088	13.06%	PC	NDP	22,365	16,277	7,791	–	–	51	–	–	–	146	46,630
NB	Northumberland—Miramichi	Lib	Lib	14,799	54.79%	7,282	26.96%	PC	NDP	14,799	7,517	4,694	–	–	–	–	–	–	–	27,010
NB	Restigouche	Lib	Lib	16,560	61.25%	11,441	42.32%	PC	NDP	16,560	5,119	4,457	–	692	–	–	–	–	207	27,035
NB	Saint John	PC	Lib	13,122	41.44%	759	2.40%	PC	NDP	13,122	12,363	5,978	–	–	35	66	–	–	103	31,667
NB	Westmorland—Kent	Lib	Lib	21,625	67.12%	16,286	50.55%	PC	NDP	21,625	5,339	5,255	–	–	–	–	–	–	–	32,219
NB	York—Sunbury	PC	PC	18,246	47.70%	4,108	10.74%	Lib	NDP	14,138	18,246	5,567	–	–	–	95	–	–	205	38,251
NL	Bonavista—Trinity—Conception	Lib	Lib	14,467	52.08%	6,079	21.89%	PC	NDP	14,467	8,388	4,619	–	–	–	–	–	–	302	27,776
NL	Burin—St. George's	Lib	Lib	14,979	69.90%	11,457	53.46%	PC	NDP	14,979	3,522	2,929	–	–	–	–	–	–	–	21,430
NL	Gander—Twillingate	Lib	Lib	17,465	63.30%	9,677	35.07%	PC	NDP	17,465	7,788	2,338	–	–	–	–	–	–	–	27,591
NL	Grand Falls—White Bay—Labrador	Lib	Lib	15,530	52.67%	8,155	27.66%	PC	NDP	15,530	7,375	6,582	–	–	–	–	–	–	–	29,487
NL	Humber—Port au Port—St. Barbe	NDP	Lib	13,170	44.56%	3,635	12.30%	NDP	PC	13,170	6,852	9,535	–	–	–	–	–	–	–	29,557
NL	St. John's East	PC	PC	20,007	61.26%	11,687	35.78%	Lib	NDP	8,320	20,007	3,973	–	–	91	–	–	–	270	32,661
NL	St. John's West	PC	PC	19,067	55.20%	7,644	22.13%	Lib	NDP	11,423	19,067	3,967	–	–	86	–	–	–	–	34,543
NS	Annapolis Valley—Hants	PC	PC	17,152	41.97%	4,348	10.64%	Lib	NDP	12,804	17,152	10,338	–	343	–	–	–	–	233	40,870
NS	Cape Breton Highlands—Canso	Lib	Lib	18,262	50.40%	5,463	15.08%	PC	NDP	18,262	12,799	4,902	–	–	–	–	–	–	272	36,235
NS	Cape Breton—East Richmond	NDP	Lib	12,478	39.27%	294	0.93%	NDP	PC	12,478	7,115	12,184	–	–	–	–	–	–	–	31,777
NS	Cape Breton—The Sydneys	Lib	Lib	15,164	43.80%	4,984	14.40%	NDP	PC	15,164	9,191	10,180	–	–	85	–	–	–	–	34,620
NS	Central Nova	PC	PC	15,576	48.03%	4,465	13.77%	Lib	NDP	11,111	15,576	5,743	–	–	–	–	–	–	–	32,430
NS	Cumberland—Colchester	PC	PC	18,463	46.34%	4,726	11.86%	Lib	NDP	13,737	18,463	7,111	–	–	–	–	–	–	531	39,842
NS	Dartmouth—Halifax East	PC	PC	17,968	41.85%	1,768	4.12%	Lib	NDP	16,200	17,968	8,764	–	–	–	–	–	–	–	42,932
NS	Halifax	PC	Lib	16,949	41.63%	1,239	3.04%	PC	NDP	16,949	15,710	8,009	–	–	48	–	–	–	–	40,716
NS	Halifax West	PC	PC	19,195	39.97%	673	1.40%	Lib	NDP	18,522	19,195	10,043	–	–	–	–	–	–	266	48,026
NS	South Shore	PC	PC	16,139	44.39%	2,213	6.09%	Lib	NDP	13,926	16,139	5,856	–	433	–	–	–	–	–	36,354
NS	South West Nova	PC	Lib	19,151	49.82%	5,000	13.01%	PC	NDP	19,151	14,151	4,922	–	–	–	–	–	–	216	38,440
ON	Algoma	Lib	Lib	17,432	50.54%	6,170	17.89%	NDP	PC	17,432	5,633	11,262	–	–	49	113	–	–	–	34,489
ON	Beaches	PC	NDP	12,675	35.58%	1,496	4.20%	Lib	PC	11,179	11,179	12,675	–	214	60	272	–	–	45	35,624
ON	Brampton—Georgetown	PC	PC	25,243	40.45%	367	0.59%	Lib	NDP	24,876	25,243	11,978	–	–	40	201	–	64	–	62,402
ON	Brant	NDP	NDP	19,194	41.12%	4,580	9.81%	PC	Lib	12,725	14,614	19,194	103	–	44	–	–	–	–	46,680
ON	Broadview—Greenwood	NDP	NDP	12,953	40.37%	2,352	7.33%	Lib	PC	10,601	7,677	12,953	–	196	53	352	–	164	93	32,089
ON	Bruce—Grey	PC	PC	18,326	47.29%	2,591	6.69%	Lib	NDP	15,735	18,326	4,391	–	–	–	299	–	–	–	38,751
ON	Burlington	PC	PC	27,212	50.76%	9,638	17.98%	Lib	NDP	17,574	27,212	8,421	–	–	63	341	–	–	–	53,611
ON	Cambridge	PC	PC	14,314	39.35%	2,968	8.16%	NDP	Lib	10,531	14,314	11,346	103	–	82	–	–	–	–	36,376
ON	Cochrane	Lib	Lib	15,280	52.59%	4,466	15.37%	NDP	PC	15,280	2,852	10,814	–	–	111	–	–	–	–	29,057
ON	Davenport	Lib	Lib	14,545	62.42%	9,375	40.23%	NDP	PC	14,545	3,167	5,170	–	–	72	230	–	117	–	23,301
ON	Don Valley East	PC	Lib	21,944	44.60%	825	1.68%	PC	NDP	21,944	21,119	5,713	–	–	40	286	–	–	98	49,200
ON	Don Valley West	PC	PC	25,260	51.76%	6,830	14.00%	Lib	NDP	18,430	25,260	4,702	–	–	42	365	–	–	–	48,799
ON	Durham—Northumberland	PC	PC	17,587	45.08%	6,000	15.38%	Lib	NDP	11,587	17,587	9,453	–	–	16	374	–	–	–	39,017
ON	Eglinton—Lawrence	Lib	Lib	20,861	50.47%	6,876	16.63%	PC	NDP	20,861	13,985	6,077	–	–	71	343	–	–	–	41,337
ON	Elgin	PC	PC	16,845	49.81%	4,435	13.11%	Lib	NDP	12,410	16,845	4,508	–	–	57	–	–	–	–	33,820
ON	Erie	PC	PC	12,861	40.01%	527	1.64%	Lib	NDP	12,334	12,861	6,848	–	–	105	–	–	–	–	32,148
ON	Essex—Kent	Lib	Lib	16,898	52.95%	6,968	21.84%	PC	NDP	16,898	9,930	5,083	–	–	–	–	–	–	–	31,911
ON	Essex—Windsor	Lib	Lib	24,651	51.29%	5,528	11.50%	NDP	PC	24,651	4,184	19,123	–	–	103	–	–	–	–	48,061
ON	Etobicoke Centre	PC	PC	26,969	47.10%	3,254	5.68%	Lib	NDP	23,715	26,969	6,181	–	–	88	308	–	–	–	57,261
ON	Etobicoke North	Lib	Lib	24,243	47.46%	8,289	16.23%	PC	NDP	24,243	15,954	10,237	–	–	75	524	–	–	49	51,082
ON	Etobicoke—Lakeshore	Lib	Lib	17,903	40.83%	4,694	10.70%	PC	NDP	17,903	13,209	12,405	–	–	88	247	–	–	–	43,852
ON	Glengarry—Prescott—Russell	Lib	Lib	28,189	68.46%	20,076	48.76%	PC	NDP	28,189	8,113	4,781	–	–	90	–	–	–	–	41,173
ON	Grey—Simcoe	PC	PC	16,488	46.09%	3,935	11.00%	Lib	NDP	12,553	16,488	6,236	93	–	–	404	–	–	–	35,774
ON	Guelph	PC	Lib	17,268	39.21%	729	1.66%	PC	NDP	17,268	16,539	9,765	–	272	53	103	–	45	–	44,045
ON	Haldimand—Norfolk	PC	PC	18,600	42.00%	139	0.31%	Lib	NDP	18,461	18,600	6,937	284	–	–	–	–	–	–	44,282
ON	Halton	PC	PC	24,752	46.78%	5,372	10.15%	Lib	NDP	19,380	24,752	8,455	–	–	18	170	–	–	142	52,917
ON	Hamilton East	Lib	Lib	15,430	41.81%	2,803	7.59%	NDP	PC	15,430	8,587	12,627	–	–	47	–	–	159	58	36,908
ON	Hamilton Mountain	PC	NDP	17,700	35.47%	1,492	2.99%	PC	Lib	15,873	16,208	17,700	–	–	57	–	–	65	–	49,903
ON	Hamilton West	PC	PC	15,500	38.56%	571	1.42%	Lib	NDP	14,929	15,500	9,330	–	304	139	–	–	–	–	40,202
ON	Hamilton—Wentworth	PC	PC	18,918	44.98%	5,214	12.40%	Lib	NDP	13,704	18,918	9,392	–	–	46	–	–	–	–	42,060
ON	Hastings—Frontenac	PC	PC	14,211	42.32%	1,079	3.21%	Lib	NDP	13,132	14,211	5,895	–	–	–	–	–	–	342	33,580
ON	Huron—Bruce	PC	PC	16,520	47.54%	2,156	6.20%	Lib	NDP	14,364	16,520	3,864	–	–	–	–	–	–	–	34,748
ON	Kenora—Rainy River	Lib	Lib	14,688	42.33%	366	1.05%	NDP	PC	14,688	5,571	14,322	–	–	120	–	–	–	–	34,701
ON	Kent	PC	Lib	15,140	43.02%	847	2.41%	PC	NDP	15,140	14,293	5,758	–	–	–	–	–	–	–	35,191
ON	Kingston and the Islands	PC	PC	18,146	41.82%	1,107	2.55%	Lib	NDP	17,039	18,146	7,830	–	373	–	–	–	–	–	43,388
ON	Kitchener	PC	Lib	19,502	39.28%	1,512	3.05%	PC	NDP	19,502	17,990	11,494	–	292	59	309	–	–	–	49,646
ON	Lambton—Middlesex	PC	Lib	17,081	44.98%	807	2.13%	PC	NDP	17,081	16,274	4,617	–	–	–	–	–	–	–	37,972
ON	Lanark—Renfrew—Carleton	PC	PC	20,487	54.63%	8,670	23.12%	Lib	NDP	11,817	20,487	4,948	–	–	–	–	–	–	247	37,499
ON	Leeds—Grenville	PC	PC	19,800	51.22%	7,540	19.50%	Lib	NDP	12,260	19,800	6,600	–	–	–	–	–	–	–	38,660
ON	Lincoln	PC	Lib	17,449	36.49%	708	1.48%	PC	NDP	17,449	16,741	13,500	–	–	133	–	–	–	–	47,823
ON	London East	Lib	Lib	17,861	48.05%	6,830	18.37%	PC	NDP	17,861	11,031	8,055	–	–	31	197	–	–	–	37,175
ON	London West	Lib	Lib	27,118	44.18%	2,087	3.40%	PC	NDP	27,118	25,031	8,817	–	224	35	159	–	–	–	61,384
ON	London—Middlesex	PC	Lib	15,682	43.02%	3,785	10.38%	PC	NDP	15,682	11,897	8,672	–	–	47	156	–	–	–	36,454
ON	Mississauga North	PC	Lib	30,531	44.65%	4,792	7.01%	PC	NDP	30,531	25,739	11,729	–	–	74	306	–	–	–	68,379
ON	Mississauga South	PC	PC	21,480	41.45%	473	0.91%	Lib	NDP	21,007	21,480	8,711	–	–	31	405	–	–	188	51,822
ON	Nepean—Carleton	PC	PC	31,498	53.55%	12,016	20.43%	Lib	NDP	19,482	31,498	7,187	–	658	–	–	–	–	–	58,825
ON	Niagara Falls	PC	Lib	15,871	41.15%	1,620	4.20%	PC	NDP	15,871	14,251	8,167	221	–	61	–	–	–	–	38,571
ON	Nickel Belt	NDP	Lib	19,805	47.52%	2,276	5.46%	NDP	PC	19,805	4,250	17,529	–	–	89	–	–	–	–	41,673
ON	Nipissing	Lib	Lib	16,394	50.33%	4,733	14.53%	PC	NDP	16,394	11,661	4,515	–	–	–	–	–	–	–	32,570
ON	Northumberland	PC	PC	17,860	48.41%	3,935	10.67%	Lib	NDP	13,925	17,860	5,108	–	–	–	–	–	–	–	36,893
ON	Ontario	PC	PC	19,963	40.88%	4,469	9.15%	Lib	NDP	15,494	19,963	12,812	–	313	42	211	–	–	–	48,835
ON	Oshawa	NDP	NDP	26,761	51.64%	12,116	23.38%	PC	Lib	10,129	14,645	26,761	–	–	29	178	–	81	–	51,823
ON	Ottawa Centre	Lib	Lib	21,659	45.90%	4,478	9.49%	PC	NDP	21,659	17,181	7,529	–	358	44	–	–	116	300	47,187
ON	Ottawa West	PC	Lib	22,460	44.25%	520	1.02%	PC	NDP	22,460	21,940	5,955	–	–	–	–	–	–	398	50,753
ON	Ottawa—Carleton	Lib	Lib	34,960	53.48%	12,576	19.24%	PC	NDP	34,960	22,384	7,788	–	–	–	–	–	–	235	65,367
ON	Ottawa—Vanier	Lib	Lib	27,564	66.50%	20,185	48.70%	PC	NDP	27,564	7,379	5,721	–	519	100	–	–	–	166	41,449
ON	Oxford	PC	PC	19,382	45.90%	3,836	9.08%	Lib	NDP	15,546	19,382	6,885	–	–	100	311	–	–	–	42,224
ON	Parkdale—High Park	Lib	Lib	17,213	45.56%	5,097	13.49%	PC	NDP	17,213	12,116	8,094	–	–	55	146	–	160	–	37,784
ON	Parry Sound—Muskoka	PC	PC	14,333	42.05%	2,184	6.41%	Lib	NDP	12,149	14,333	7,603	–	–	–	–	–	–	–	34,085
ON	Perth	PC	PC	15,172	47.50%	3,095	9.69%	Lib	NDP	12,077	15,172	4,635	–	–	56	–	–	–	–	31,940
ON	Peterborough	PC	PC	19,417	40.25%	2,215	4.59%	Lib	NDP	17,202	19,417	10,776	–	243	67	469	–	–	69	48,243
ON	Prince Edward—Hastings	PC	PC	16,893	45.89%	4,072	11.06%	Lib	NDP	12,821	16,893	6,889	–	–	–	–	–	–	211	36,814
ON	Renfrew—Nipissing—Pembroke	Lib	Lib	20,529	51.72%	7,563	19.05%	PC	NDP	20,529	12,966	6,200	–	–	–	–	–	–	–	39,695
ON	Rosedale	PC	PC	16,862	43.96%	1,869	4.87%	Lib	NDP	14,993	16,862	5,698	–	319	34	140	–	85	229	38,360
ON	Sarnia	PC	Lib	16,275	40.56%	2,289	5.71%	PC	NDP	16,275	13,986	9,809	–	–	52	–	–	–	–	40,122
ON	Sault Ste. Marie	NDP	Lib	15,449	47.96%	2,907	9.02%	NDP	PC	15,449	4,161	12,542	–	–	59	–	–	–	–	32,211
ON	Scarborough Centre	PC	Lib	16,595	40.32%	1,600	3.89%	PC	NDP	16,595	14,995	9,237	–	–	97	238	–	–	–	41,162
ON	Scarborough East	PC	PC	17,658	40.52%	511	1.17%	Lib	NDP	17,147	17,658	8,533	–	–	60	181	–	–	–	43,579
ON	Scarborough West	PC	Lib	14,316	35.12%	1,170	2.87%	NDP	PC	14,316	12,744	13,146	–	–	66	401	–	92	–	40,765
ON	Simcoe North	PC	PC	14,874	36.44%	66	0.16%	Lib	NDP	14,808	14,874	11,139	–	–	–	–	–	–	–	40,821
ON	Simcoe South	PC	PC	19,768	43.53%	3,594	7.91%	Lib	NDP	16,174	19,768	9,474	–	–	–	–	–	–	–	45,416
ON	Spadina	Lib	Lib	13,280	46.79%	5,048	17.78%	NDP	PC	13,280	5,929	8,232	–	396	59	227	–	91	171	28,385
ON	St. Catharines	PC	PC	18,622	37.89%	1,449	2.95%	Lib	NDP	17,173	18,622	13,006	–	230	35	–	–	76	–	49,142
ON	St. Paul's	PC	Lib	17,905	45.25%	2,262	5.72%	PC	NDP	17,905	15,643	5,301	–	311	22	162	–	76	145	39,565
ON	Stormont—Dundas	Lib	Lib	22,251	53.02%	7,162	17.06%	PC	NDP	22,251	15,089	4,629	–	–	–	–	–	–	–	41,969
ON	Sudbury	Lib	Lib	21,954	55.70%	9,674	24.54%	NDP	PC	21,954	4,661	12,280	–	288	93	–	–	58	83	39,417
ON	Thunder Bay—Atikokan	Lib	Lib	13,234	39.23%	84	0.25%	NDP	PC	13,234	7,225	13,150	–	–	35	87	–	–	–	33,731
ON	Thunder Bay—Nipigon	Lib	Lib	16,582	46.61%	3,632	10.21%	NDP	PC	16,582	5,865	12,950	–	–	68	–	–	109	–	35,574
ON	Timiskaming	NDP	Lib	11,135	41.56%	474	1.77%	NDP	PC	11,135	4,901	10,661	–	–	93	–	–	–	–	26,790
ON	Timmins—Chapleau	Lib	Lib	15,628	51.93%	4,883	16.23%	NDP	PC	15,628	3,663	10,745	–	–	57	–	–	–	–	30,093
ON	Trinity	Lib	Lib	12,628	57.52%	7,623	34.72%	NDP	PC	12,628	3,695	5,005	–	–	57	412	–	159	–	21,956
ON	Victoria—Haliburton	PC	PC	20,308	48.41%	7,920	18.88%	Lib	NDP	12,388	20,308	8,884	–	–	–	367	–	–	–	41,947
ON	Waterloo	PC	PC	20,609	39.99%	154	0.30%	Lib	NDP	20,455	20,609	9,819	–	330	87	229	–	–	–	51,529
ON	Welland	Lib	Lib	18,112	43.85%	6,383	15.45%	NDP	PC	18,112	11,292	11,729	–	–	78	–	–	95	–	41,306
ON	Wellington—Dufferin—Simcoe	PC	PC	21,205	53.77%	9,101	23.08%	Lib	NDP	12,104	21,205	5,966	–	–	–	162	–	–	–	39,437
ON	Willowdale	PC	Lib	22,235	47.44%	4,708	10.05%	PC	NDP	22,235	17,527	6,889	–	–	46	170	–	–	–	46,867
ON	Windsor West	Lib	Lib	19,755	58.50%	9,970	29.52%	NDP	PC	19,755	4,107	9,785	–	–	49	–	–	72	–	33,768
ON	Windsor—Walkerville	Lib	Lib	20,869	52.02%	6,409	15.97%	NDP	PC	20,869	4,581	14,460	–	–	67	–	–	142	–	40,119
ON	York Centre	Lib	Lib	23,116	60.96%	15,420	40.67%	NDP	PC	23,116	6,736	7,696	–	–	86	284	–	–	–	37,918
ON	York East	PC	Lib	20,580	44.85%	3,908	8.52%	PC	NDP	20,580	16,672	7,997	–	237	49	352	–	–	–	45,887
ON	York North	PC	PC	26,039	43.51%	1,758	2.94%	Lib	NDP	24,281	26,039	8,933	–	–	55	538	–	–	–	59,846
ON	York South—Weston	Lib	Lib	16,520	47.21%	7,240	20.69%	NDP	PC	16,520	8,711	9,280	–	–	82	299	–	99	–	34,991
ON	York West	Lib	Lib	21,385	56.76%	12,501	33.18%	NDP	PC	21,385	7,101	8,884	–	–	29	194	–	85	–	37,678
ON	York—Peel	PC	PC	23,955	47.09%	6,652	13.08%	Lib	NDP	17,303	23,955	8,708	–	589	–	317	–	–	–	50,872
ON	York—Scarborough	PC	Lib	39,208	47.91%	8,283	10.12%	PC	NDP	39,208	30,925	10,939	–	–	75	308	–	–	384	81,839
PE	Cardigan	PC	Lib	8,590	48.18%	584	3.28%	PC	NDP	8,590	8,006	1,054	–	–	–	–	–	–	180	17,830
PE	Egmont	PC	Lib	8,639	52.37%	1,606	9.74%	PC	NDP	8,639	7,033	824	–	–	–	–	–	–	–	16,496
PE	Hillsborough	PC	PC	7,128	47.66%	573	3.83%	Lib	NDP	6,555	7,128	1,245	–	–	28	–	–	–	–	14,956
PE	Malpeque	PC	PC	8,486	50.14%	1,265	7.48%	Lib	NDP	7,221	8,486	1,216	–	–	–	–	–	–	–	16,923
QC	Abitibi	SC	Lib	22,050	51.05%	7,169	16.60%	SC	NDP	22,050	1,982	2,553	14,881	–	300	–	416	–	1,008	43,190
QC	Argenteuil	Lib	Lib	21,976	68.60%	16,848	52.60%	PC	NDP	21,976	5,128	2,422	1,074	1,298	135	–	–	–	–	32,033
QC	Beauce	SC	Lib	21,647	50.88%	2,913	6.85%	SC	PC	21,647	819	404	18,734	624	38	–	–	–	276	42,542
QC	Beauharnois—Salaberry	Lib	Lib	27,476	73.14%	21,847	58.16%	PC	NDP	27,476	5,629	2,738	1,017	–	77	–	217	–	410	37,564
QC	Bellechasse	SC	Lib	20,636	51.13%	5,512	13.66%	SC	PC	20,636	2,912	730	15,124	815	–	–	141	–	–	40,358
QC	Berthier—Maskinongé	Lib	Lib	21,232	52.73%	3,749	9.31%	PC	Rhino	21,232	17,483	–	546	728	146	–	132	–	–	40,267
QC	Blainville—Deux-Montagnes	Lib	Lib	35,979	74.01%	30,519	62.78%	NDP	PC	35,979	3,448	5,460	1,699	1,685	58	73	213	–	–	48,615
QC	Bonaventure—Îles-de-la-Madeleine	Lib	Lib	19,193	69.39%	14,130	51.08%	PC	NDP	19,193	5,063	1,568	528	1,308	–	–	–	–	–	27,660
QC	Bourassa	Lib	Lib	30,924	76.49%	25,780	63.76%	NDP	PC	30,924	3,182	5,144	–	–	305	–	875	–	–	40,430
QC	Chambly	Lib	Lib	32,849	69.86%	26,981	57.38%	NDP	PC	32,849	4,655	5,868	1,580	1,724	118	–	227	–	–	47,021
QC	Champlain	Lib	Lib	25,758	64.89%	16,594	41.80%	NDP	PC	25,758	4,359	9,164	–	–	178	–	238	–	–	39,697
QC	Charlesbourg	Lib	Lib	42,569	71.06%	35,181	58.73%	NDP	PC	42,569	4,128	7,388	2,275	3,066	–	–	480	–	–	59,906
QC	Charlevoix	Lib	Lib	22,130	70.75%	16,451	52.59%	PC	NDP	22,130	5,679	1,273	1,021	945	–	–	232	–	–	31,280
QC	Châteauguay	Lib	Lib	27,152	74.15%	22,949	62.67%	NDP	PC	27,152	3,311	4,203	1,182	–	199	–	570	–	–	36,617
QC	Chicoutimi	Lib	Lib	20,821	67.52%	15,214	49.33%	PC	NDP	20,821	5,607	2,926	1,110	–	–	–	375	–	–	30,839
QC	Dollard	Lib	Lib	37,860	76.45%	32,093	64.80%	NDP	PC	37,860	5,303	5,767	–	–	138	170	285	–	–	49,523
QC	Drummond	Lib	Lib	26,082	72.76%	20,817	58.08%	PC	NDP	26,082	5,265	2,305	1,916	–	97	–	180	–	–	35,845
QC	Duvernay	Lib	Lib	34,560	72.43%	29,491	61.81%	NDP	PC	34,560	3,647	5,069	1,542	2,479	112	–	218	88	–	47,715
QC	Frontenac	Lib	Lib	14,745	45.89%	4,417	13.75%	SC	PC	14,745	4,922	1,693	10,328 (Note: Nelson Lessard, nominated as the Social Credit candidate, died before the scheduled election date, which had to be deferred to March 24. Fabien Roy (who had just been defeated in Beauce), stepped in, thus being legally nominated in two separate contests in 1980.)	–	46	–	–	–	395	32,129
QC	Gamelin	Lib	Lib	29,232	72.39%	24,726	61.23%	NDP	PC	29,232	3,245	4,506	1,162	1,640	87	–	181	–	326	40,379
QC	Gaspé	Lib	Lib	17,846	60.53%	8,242	27.96%	PC	NDP	17,846	9,604	1,018	–	759	–	–	–	–	255	29,482
QC	Gatineau	Lib	Lib	35,437	78.60%	30,645	67.97%	NDP	PC	35,437	3,134	4,792	975	640	108	–	–	–	–	45,086
QC	Hochelaga—Maisonneuve	Lib	Lib	21,138	73.36%	18,406	63.88%	NDP	PC	21,138	1,977	2,732	873	1,412	98	–	98	–	486	28,814
QC	Hull	Lib	Lib	27,938	68.13%	17,879	43.60%	NDP	PC	27,938	2,167	10,059	–	598	70	–	–	–	174	41,006
QC	Joliette	PC	PC	22,280	46.96%	389	0.82%	Lib	NDP	21,891	22,280	2,330	756	–	184	–	–	–	–	47,441
QC	Jonquière	Lib	Lib	22,202	75.02%	17,758	60.01%	NDP	SC	22,202	1,126	4,444	1,315	–	127	–	380	–	–	29,594
QC	Kamouraska—Rivière-du-Loup	Lib	Lib	19,117	54.84%	6,016	17.26%	SC	PC	19,117	1,519	–	13,101	707	–	–	414	–	–	34,858
QC	Labelle	Lib	Lib	29,488	66.55%	19,659	44.36%	PC	NDP	29,488	9,829	2,858	–	1,575	108	–	227	–	227	44,312
QC	Lac-Saint-Jean	Lib	Lib	21,267	63.35%	16,659	49.62%	PC	NDP	21,267	4,608	3,465	2,821	1,159	–	–	252	–	–	33,572
QC	Lachine	Lib	Lib	25,502	59.74%	12,648	29.63%	PC	NDP	25,502	12,854	3,492	–	692	43	106	–	–	–	42,689
QC	Langelier	Lib	Lib	24,714	71.49%	21,901	63.35%	Rhino	NDP	24,714	2,606	2,811	1,191	2,813	115	–	252	68	–	34,570
QC	Laprairie	Lib	Lib	36,842	72.07%	30,948	60.54%	NDP	PC	36,842	4,960	5,894	948	1,868	87	297	222	–	–	51,118
QC	Lasalle	Lib	Lib	32,561	78.23%	27,388	65.80%	NDP	PC	32,561	3,128	5,173	–	–	255	–	507	–	–	41,624
QC	Laurier	Lib	Lib	16,201	66.66%	13,134	54.04%	Rhino	NDP	16,201	1,572	2,216	534	3,067	63	–	95	107	448	24,303
QC	Laval	Lib	Lib	38,580	75.34%	32,871	64.19%	NDP	PC	38,580	3,715	5,709	1,110	1,679	142	–	271	–	–	51,206
QC	Laval-des-Rapides	Lib	Lib	33,317	74.96%	28,618	64.39%	NDP	PC	33,317	3,049	4,699	911	2,152	100	–	216	–	–	44,444
QC	Lévis	Lib	Lib	35,519	66.69%	29,060	54.57%	NDP	PC	35,519	4,759	6,459	3,385	2,652	118	–	264	–	101	53,257
QC	Longueuil	Lib	Lib	32,755	68.96%	26,611	56.03%	NDP	PC	32,755	3,383	6,144	1,688	2,631	92	–	362	73	368	47,496
QC	Lotbinière	SC	Lib	24,780	59.11%	15,663	37.36%	PC	SC	24,780	9,117	3,041	3,707	945	59	–	75	–	201	41,925
QC	Louis-Hébert	Lib	Lib	34,231	64.75%	26,839	50.77%	NDP	PC	34,231	5,490	7,392	1,247	3,795	112	–	596	–	–	52,863
QC	Manicouagan	Lib	Lib	21,499	68.65%	16,655	53.18%	PC	NDP	21,499	4,844	2,111	1,184	1,556	125	–	–	–	–	31,319
QC	Matapédia—Matane	Lib	Lib	21,116	77.84%	18,021	66.43%	PC	SC	21,116	3,095	888	1,137	892	–	–	–	–	–	27,128
QC	Mégantic—Compton—Stanstead	Lib	Lib	21,562	57.21%	11,226	29.78%	PC	SC	21,562	10,336	1,769	3,023	1,002	–	–	–	–	–	37,692
QC	Mercier	Lib	Lib	27,428	70.55%	23,170	59.59%	NDP	PC	27,428	3,161	4,258	1,891	1,835	146	–	161	–	–	38,880
QC	Missisquoi	PC	Lib	20,022	53.08%	4,609	12.22%	PC	NDP	20,022	15,413	1,508	–	687	89	–	–	–	–	37,719
QC	Montmorency	Lib	Lib	28,403	70.11%	24,044	59.35%	PC	NDP	28,403	4,359	3,049	1,744	1,913	142	–	322	–	578	40,510
QC	Mount Royal	Lib	Lib	33,821	81.23%	29,419	70.66%	PC	NDP	33,821	4,402	2,356	–	715	68	126	–	–	149	41,637
QC	Notre-Dame-de-Grâce	Lib	Lib	27,604	71.16%	21,913	56.49%	PC	NDP	27,604	5,691	4,482	–	900	114	–	–	–	–	38,791
QC	Outremont	Lib	Lib	23,004	71.49%	19,008	59.07%	NDP	PC	23,004	2,355	3,996	–	2,065	64	–	128	150	417	32,179
QC	Papineau	Lib	Lib	22,399	74.69%	19,603	65.37%	NDP	PC	22,399	1,634	2,796	999	1,608	71	–	170	68	245	29,990
QC	Pontiac—Gatineau—Labelle	Lib	Lib	21,605	70.39%	16,454	53.61%	PC	NDP	21,605	5,151	2,813	–	643	176	–	306	–	–	30,694
QC	Portneuf	Lib	Lib	29,234	73.86%	25,949	65.56%	NDP	PC	29,234	2,905	3,285	2,320	1,634	–	–	204	–	–	39,582
QC	Québec-Est	Lib	Lib	27,546	73.01%	24,219	64.19%	NDP	PC	27,546	2,577	3,327	1,998	1,862	108	–	199	–	111	37,728
QC	Richelieu	Lib	Lib	27,886	68.15%	19,731	48.22%	PC	NDP	27,886	8,155	3,004	–	1,215	124	–	265	–	268	40,917
QC	Richmond	Lib	Lib	21,104	63.67%	12,739	38.44%	PC	NDP	21,104	8,365	1,477	1,322	876	–	–	–	–	–	33,144
QC	Rimouski	SC	Lib	21,482	56.03%	10,643	27.76%	SC	PC	21,482	3,999	1,155	10,839	627	74	–	–	–	166	38,342
QC	Roberval	SC	Lib	17,724	51.92%	2,892	8.47%	SC	NDP	17,724	507	569	14,832	503	–	–	–	–	–	34,135
QC	Rosemont	Lib	Lib	26,544	75.86%	23,207	66.33%	NDP	PC	26,544	2,260	3,337	912	1,310	91	–	139	–	396	34,989
QC	Saint-Denis	Lib	Lib	28,383	77.42%	24,898	67.91%	NDP	PC	28,383	2,312	3,485	743	1,232	182	–	161	165	–	36,663
QC	Saint-Henri—Westmount	Lib	Lib	24,907	67.49%	18,238	49.42%	PC	NDP	24,907	6,669	3,766	–	1,140	114	196	–	–	113	36,905
QC	Saint-Hyacinthe	Lib	Lib	28,130	66.96%	18,097	43.08%	PC	NDP	28,130	10,033	2,257	–	868	66	–	114	–	540	42,008
QC	Saint-Jacques	Lib	Lib	17,757	71.22%	14,719	59.03%	PC	NDP	17,757	3,038	2,339	–	1,080	96	137	120	88	279	24,934
QC	Saint-Jean	Lib	Lib	30,134	72.12%	24,940	59.69%	NDP	PC	30,134	4,410	5,194	929	982	136	–	–	–	–	41,785
QC	Saint-Léonard—Anjou	Lib	Lib	42,228	81.12%	38,487	73.94%	NDP	PC	42,228	2,972	3,741	1,194	1,569	91	–	260	–	–	52,055
QC	Saint-Maurice	Lib	Lib	27,356	76.70%	24,840	69.65%	PC	SC	27,356	2,516	1,963	2,369	1,206	95	–	161	–	–	35,666
QC	Saint-Michel	Lib	Lib	27,210	75.48%	23,788	65.99%	NDP	PC	27,210	2,059	3,422	1,079	1,603	93	–	279	116	189	36,050
QC	Sainte-Marie	Lib	Lib	19,160	68.49%	15,584	55.71%	PC	NDP	19,160	3,576	2,443	605	1,659	115	–	114	–	301	27,973
QC	Shefford	Lib	Lib	32,449	68.47%	22,612	47.71%	PC	NDP	32,449	9,837	3,701	–	1,274	129	–	–	–	–	47,390
QC	Sherbrooke	Lib	Lib	27,224	71.79%	23,447	61.83%	NDP	PC	27,224	3,514	3,777	1,577	1,401	60	–	90	79	200	37,922
QC	Témiscamingue	Lib	Lib	22,031	61.02%	13,378	37.05%	SC	PC	22,031	1,886	1,586	8,653	1,206	96	–	510	–	136	36,104
QC	Terrebonne	Lib	Lib	36,089	68.27%	29,172	55.19%	NDP	PC	36,089	4,807	6,917	2,839	1,844	131	–	233	–	–	52,860
QC	Trois-Rivières	Lib	Lib	23,791	68.48%	19,309	55.58%	PC	NDP	23,791	4,482	3,870	–	–	168	–	249	–	2,181	34,741
QC	Vaudreuil	Lib	Lib	39,159	72.56%	31,850	59.01%	NDP	PC	39,159	6,277	7,309	–	–	234	479	513	–	–	53,971
QC	Verchères	Lib	Lib	37,393	68.14%	30,378	55.36%	NDP	PC	37,393	5,653	7,015	1,514	2,804	88	–	410	–	–	54,877
QC	Verdun	Lib	Lib	27,575	75.33%	23,940	65.40%	NDP	PC	27,575	3,423	3,635	599	1,141	80	–	155	–	–	36,608
SK	Assiniboia	PC	PC	11,251	35.94%	1,084	3.46%	Lib	NDP	10,167	11,251	9,710	178	–	–	–	–	–	–	31,306
SK	Humboldt—Lake Centre	PC	NDP	13,243	41.63%	1,652	5.19%	PC	Lib	6,981	11,591	13,243	–	–	–	–	–	–	–	31,815
SK	Kindersley—Lloydminster	PC	PC	14,220	46.27%	4,631	15.07%	NDP	Lib	6,631	14,220	9,589	–	294	–	–	–	–	–	30,734
SK	Mackenzie	PC	PC	10,794	41.61%	359	1.38%	NDP	Lib	4,548	10,794	10,435	–	–	–	–	–	165	–	25,942
SK	Moose Jaw	PC	PC	14,330	46.42%	3,689	11.95%	NDP	Lib	5,713	14,330	10,641	–	–	–	64	–	–	124	30,872
SK	Prince Albert	PC	NDP	11,601	34.80%	682	2.05%	Lib	PC	10,919	10,819	11,601	–	–	–	–	–	–	–	33,339
SK	Qu'Appelle—Moose Mountain	PC	PC	13,676	49.57%	5,804	21.04%	NDP	Lib	6,042	13,676	7,872	–	–	–	–	–	–	–	27,590
SK	Regina East	NDP	NDP	13,630	36.83%	1,028	2.78%	PC	Lib	10,302	12,602	13,630	–	302	61	–	–	39	74	37,010
SK	Regina West	NDP	NDP	17,353	42.20%	3,979	9.68%	PC	Lib	10,190	13,374	17,353	–	–	55	–	–	–	151	41,123
SK	Saskatoon East	NDP	NDP	12,985	34.51%	612	1.63%	PC	Lib	11,483	12,373	12,985	–	–	63	–	–	–	728	37,632
SK	Saskatoon West	PC	PC	17,636	43.33%	2,784	6.84%	NDP	Lib	8,116	17,636	14,852	–	–	97	–	–	–	–	40,701
SK	Swift Current—Maple Creek	PC	PC	12,917	47.97%	4,579	17.00%	NDP	Lib	5,673	12,917	8,338	–	–	–	–	–	–	–	26,928
SK	The Battlefords—Meadow Lake	PC	NDP	9,819	35.80%	476	1.74%	PC	Lib	8,088	9,343	9,819	–	–	–	–	–	–	178	27,428
SK	Yorkton—Melville	NDP	NDP	15,240	45.69%	2,790	8.36%	PC	Lib	5,664	12,450	15,240	–	–	–	–	–	–	–	33,354
Terr	Nunatsiaq	NDP	NDP	2,688	47.27%	311	5.47%	Lib	PC	2,377	442	2,688	–	180	–	–	–	–	–	5,687
Terr	Western Arctic	PC	PC	3,556	33.81%	19	0.18%	NDP	Lib	3,425	3,556	3,537	–	–	–	–	–	–	–	10,518
Terr	Yukon	PC	PC	3,926	40.60%	101	1.04%	Lib	NDP	3,825 (Note: Ione Christensen was previously Commissioner of Yukon.)	3,926	1,918	–	–	–	–	–	–	–	9,669

= open seat
= winning candidate was in previous Legislature
= not incumbent; was previously elected as an MP
= incumbent had switched allegiance
= incumbency arose from byelection gain
= previously incumbent in another riding
= other incumbents renominated
= campaigned under the Progressive Canadian banner
= Previously a member of one of the provincial/territorial legislatures
= multiple candidates

=== Comparative analysis for ridings (1980 vs 1979) ===
Summary of riding results by turnout, vote share for winning candidate, and swing (vs 1979)
Electoral district		Winning party		Vote share		Swing (pp)	
Province	Name	Winning party		%	Change (pp)	To	Direction (pp) (Note: Positive indicates improvement to standing of party winning in 1979; negative points to 1979's second-place party being swung to.)
AB	Athabasca	PC	Hold	44.66	-14.00	Lib	-9.11
AB	Bow River	PC	Hold	76.60	13.53	N/A (Note: Stanley Schumacher (Independent in 1979, coming in at 2nd place) chose not to run in 1980.)	
AB	Calgary Centre	PC	Hold	57.39	-1.71	Lib	-1.71
AB	Calgary East	PC	Hold	52.84	-8.05	Lib	-5.53
AB	Calgary North	PC	Hold	63.42	-0.83	Lib	-0.97
AB	Calgary South	PC	Hold	68.12	1.58	PC	2.34
AB	Calgary West	PC	Hold	65.85	0.47	PC	1.05
AB	Crowfoot	PC	Hold	76.61	-0.51	PC	1.08
AB	Edmonton East	PC	Hold	53.89	-2.16	Lib	-1.02
AB	Edmonton North	PC	Hold	58.98	-1.55	Lib	-1.50
AB	Edmonton South	PC	Hold	61.07	1.26	PC	1.78
AB	Edmonton West	PC	Hold	56.23	0.57	PC	1.15
AB	Edmonton—Strathcona	PC	Hold	59.38	-0.09	PC	0.41
AB	Lethbridge—Foothills	PC	Hold	68.60	-1.30	Lib	-0.46
AB	Medicine Hat	PC	Hold	70.32	-1.94	Lib	-1.45
AB	Peace River	PC	Hold	59.35	-3.78	Lib	-2.06
AB	Pembina	PC	Hold	64.69	-2.02	Lib	-1.04
AB	Red Deer	PC	Hold	74.75	-0.09	Lib	-0.18
AB	Vegreville	PC	Hold	74.81	-3.56	Lib	-2.45
AB	Wetaskiwin	PC	Hold	74.98	-1.32	Lib	-1.07
AB	Yellowhead	PC	Hold	69.47	-0.53	Lib	-0.75
BC	Burnaby	NDP	Hold	42.43	2.67	NDP	1.48
BC	Capilano	PC	Hold	59.36	-0.05	PC	0.40
BC	Cariboo—Chilcotin	PC	Hold	40.75	-1.97	NDP	-4.12
BC	Comox—Powell River	NDP	Hold	48.97	4.69	NDP	3.75
BC	Cowichan—Malahat—The Islands	NDP	Gain	48.16	8.19	NDP	-6.13
BC	Esquimalt—Saanich	PC	Hold	45.02	-9.50	NDP	-7.47
BC	Fraser Valley East	PC	Hold	49.71	-7.35	NDP	-5.08
BC	Fraser Valley West	PC	Hold	50.62	-3.59	NDP	-2.62
BC	Kamloops—Shuswap	NDP	Gain	39.10	11.57	Lib	-2.64
BC	Kootenay East—Revelstoke	NDP	Gain	39.87	4.80	NDP	-3.78
BC	Kootenay West	NDP	Gain	43.04	3.22	NDP	-5.14
BC	Mission—Port Moody	NDP	Hold	47.19	3.36	NDP	3.12
BC	Nanaimo—Alberni	NDP	Hold	49.20	5.22	NDP	2.21
BC	New Westminster—Coquitlam	NDP	Hold	46.42	1.98	NDP	1.62
BC	North Vancouver—Burnaby	PC	Hold	38.10	-0.08	Lib	-0.84
BC	Okanagan North	PC	Hold	48.70	-2.77	PC	0.22
BC	Okanagan—Similkameen	PC	Hold	45.02	-4.54	NDP	-3.79
BC	Prince George—Bulkley Valley	PC	Hold	39.48	-3.13	NDP	-3.88
BC	Prince George—Peace River	PC	Hold	52.10	-8.85	NDP	-7.28
BC	Richmond—South Delta	PC	Hold	51.98	-2.06	NDP	-1.07
BC	Skeena	NDP	Hold	49.52	7.70	NDP	10.28
BC	Surrey—White Rock—North Delta	PC	Hold	48.92	-3.63	NDP	-2.62
BC	Vancouver Centre	PC	Gain	35.27	0.84	PC	-2.03
BC	Vancouver East	NDP	Hold	43.91	1.21	NDP	0.12
BC	Vancouver Kingsway	NDP	Hold	46.85	2.09	NDP	2.05
BC	Vancouver Quadra	PC	Hold	46.09	0.52	Lib	-0.39
BC	Vancouver South	PC	Hold	53.28	-0.51	PC	0.02
BC	Victoria	PC	Hold	50.34	-4.39	NDP	-4.39
MB	Brandon—Souris	PC	Hold	46.87	-5.80	NDP	-2.95
MB	Churchill	NDP	Hold	43.27	-8.39	PC	-0.88
MB	Dauphin	NDP	Gain	44.81	3.24	NDP	-4.02
MB	Lisgar	PC	Hold	62.65	-7.43	Lib	-5.72
MB	Portage—Marquette	PC	Hold	53.03	-5.31	NDP	-4.22
MB	Provencher	PC	Hold	44.94	-6.73	NDP	-4.72
MB	Selkirk—Interlake	NDP	Hold	45.69	2.99	NDP	3.88
MB	St. Boniface	Lib	Hold	45.25	4.36	Lib	5.06
MB	Winnipeg North	NDP	Hold	50.53	-2.16	NDP	1.41
MB	Winnipeg North Centre	NDP	Hold	57.00	-0.64	Lib	-1.65
MB	Winnipeg—Assiniboine	PC	Hold	49.10	-7.25	Lib	-7.05
MB	Winnipeg—Birds Hill	NDP	Hold	54.27	4.11	NDP	6.55
MB	Winnipeg—Fort Garry	Lib	Hold	46.35	5.21	Lib	5.47
MB	Winnipeg—St. James	NDP	Gain	37.47	0.94	NDP	-2.13
NB	Carleton—Charlotte	PC	Hold	47.38	-8.19	Lib	-6.56
NB	Fundy—Royal	PC	Hold	40.84	-6.44	Lib	-4.90
NB	Gloucester	Lib	Hold	63.67	12.06	Lib	15.69
NB	Madawaska—Victoria	Lib	Hold	65.83	4.02	Lib	6.49
NB	Moncton	Lib	Hold	47.96	4.63	Lib	3.95
NB	Northumberland—Miramichi	Lib	Hold	54.79	7.06	Lib	7.14
NB	Restigouche	Lib	Hold	61.25	5.40	Lib	6.42
NB	Saint John	Lib	Gain	41.44	1.88	Lib	-2.20
NB	Westmorland—Kent	Lib	Hold	67.12	3.36	Lib	4.05
NB	York—Sunbury	PC	Hold	47.70	-7.35	Lib	-7.18
NL	Bonavista—Trinity—Conception	Lib	Hold	52.08	6.29	Lib	9.90
NL	Burin—St. George's	Lib	Hold	69.90	-0.44	Lib	2.22
NL	Gander—Twillingate	Lib	Hold	63.30	0.65	PC	-4.18
NL	Grand Falls—White Bay—Labrador	Lib	Hold	52.67	6.58	Lib	13.31
NL	Humber—Port au Port—St. Barbe	Lib	Gain	44.56	15.85	Lib	-17.74
NL	St. John's East	PC	Hold	61.26	2.83	Lib	-0.17
NL	St. John's West	PC	Hold	55.20	7.71	PC	1.13
NS	Annapolis Valley—Hants	PC	Hold	41.97	-8.15	Lib	-4.78
NS	Cape Breton Highlands—Canso	Lib	Hold	50.40	2.30	Lib	2.87
NS	Cape Breton—East Richmond	Lib	Gain	39.27	8.80	Lib	-7.91
NS	Cape Breton—The Sydneys	Lib	Hold	43.80	7.39	Lib	7.43
NS	Central Nova	PC	Hold	48.03	-8.55	Lib	-6.46
NS	Cumberland—Colchester	PC	Hold	46.34	-9.42	Lib	-7.10
NS	Dartmouth—Halifax East	PC	Hold	41.85	-6.87	Lib	-4.74
NS	Halifax	Lib	Gain	41.63	1.21	Lib	-1.54
NS	Halifax West	PC	Hold	39.97	-7.25	Lib	-5.55
NS	South Shore	PC	Hold	44.39	-12.74	Lib	-9.55
NS	South West Nova	Lib	Gain	49.82	5.65	Lib	-6.66
ON	Algoma	Lib	Hold	50.54	5.50	Lib	2.62
ON	Beaches	NDP	Gain	35.58	2.44	NDP	-2.80
ON	Brampton—Georgetown	PC	Hold	40.45	-7.11	Lib	-6.43
ON	Brant	NDP	Hold	41.12	-1.05	PC	-0.63
ON	Broadview—Greenwood	NDP	Hold	40.37	0.65	NDP	3.40
ON	Bruce—Grey	PC	Hold	47.29	-5.13	Lib	-5.19
ON	Burlington	PC	Hold	50.76	-5.61	Lib	-5.11
ON	Cambridge	PC	Hold	39.35	-4.15	NDP	-2.91
ON	Cochrane	Lib	Hold	52.59	8.10	Lib	4.56
ON	Davenport	Lib	Hold	62.42	6.53	Lib	4.39
ON	Don Valley East	Lib	Gain	44.60	4.72	Lib	-4.49
ON	Don Valley West	PC	Hold	51.76	-2.33	Lib	-2.81
ON	Durham—Northumberland	PC	Hold	45.08	-7.32	Lib	-5.41
ON	Eglinton—Lawrence	Lib	Hold	50.47	7.59	Lib	6.46
ON	Elgin	PC	Hold	49.81	-11.15	Lib	-10.58
ON	Erie	PC	Hold	40.01	-5.80	Lib	-5.57
ON	Essex—Kent	Lib	Hold	52.95	8.33	Lib	8.95
ON	Essex—Windsor	Lib	Hold	51.29	7.00	Lib	3.83
ON	Etobicoke Centre	PC	Hold	47.10	-4.24	Lib	-3.97
ON	Etobicoke North	Lib	Hold	47.46	7.80	Lib	6.52
ON	Etobicoke—Lakeshore	Lib	Hold	40.83	6.10	Lib	4.53
ON	Glengarry—Prescott—Russell	Lib	Hold	68.46	3.13	Lib	3.90
ON	Grey—Simcoe	PC	Hold	46.09	-8.65	Lib	-7.16
ON	Guelph	Lib	Gain	39.21	1.74	Lib	-3.08
ON	Haldimand—Norfolk	PC	Hold	42.00	-7.55	Lib	-7.13
ON	Halton	PC	Hold	46.78	-6.50	Lib	-5.71
ON	Hamilton East	Lib	Hold	41.81	3.69	Lib	0.14
ON	Hamilton Mountain	NDP	Gain	35.47	11.46	Lib	-3.59
ON	Hamilton West	PC	Hold	38.56	-7.89	Lib	-6.14
ON	Hamilton—Wentworth	PC	Hold	44.98	-7.86	Lib	-6.83
ON	Hastings—Frontenac	PC	Hold	42.32	-8.04	Lib	-7.53
ON	Huron—Bruce	PC	Hold	47.54	-11.67	Lib	-9.94
ON	Kenora—Rainy River	Lib	Hold	42.33	7.17	NDP	-0.89
ON	Kent	Lib	Gain	43.02	9.33	Lib	-10.26
ON	Kingston and the Islands	PC	Hold	41.82	-5.87	Lib	-5.91
ON	Kitchener	Lib	Gain	39.28	6.69	Lib	-7.63
ON	Lambton—Middlesex	Lib	Gain	44.98	5.35	Lib	-5.50
ON	Lanark—Renfrew—Carleton	PC	Hold	54.63	-5.29	Lib	-5.46
ON	Leeds—Grenville	PC	Hold	51.22	-5.59	Lib	-4.76
ON	Lincoln	Lib	Gain	36.49	5.31	Lib	-5.50
ON	London East	Lib	Hold	48.05	5.50	Lib	5.35
ON	London West	Lib	Hold	44.18	1.81	Lib	1.27
ON	London—Middlesex	Lib	Gain	43.02	6.10	Lib	-6.03
ON	Mississauga North	Lib	Gain	44.65	5.55	Lib	-6.16
ON	Mississauga South	PC	Hold	41.45	-7.46	Lib	-6.93
ON	Nepean—Carleton	PC	Hold	53.55	-6.03	Lib	-5.69
ON	Niagara Falls	Lib	Gain	41.15	2.62	Lib	-3.80
ON	Nickel Belt	Lib	Gain	47.52	8.97	Lib	-5.14
ON	Nipissing	Lib	Hold	50.33	5.48	Lib	4.02
ON	Northumberland	PC	Hold	48.41	-11.07	Lib	-10.95
ON	Ontario	PC	Hold	40.88	-4.24	Lib	-2.27
ON	Oshawa	NDP	Hold	51.64	0.38	NDP	2.24
ON	Ottawa Centre	Lib	Hold	45.90	5.87	Lib	3.70
ON	Ottawa West	Lib	Gain	44.25	2.62	Lib	-2.32
ON	Ottawa—Carleton	Lib	Hold	53.48	4.37	Lib	4.56
ON	Ottawa—Vanier	Lib	Hold	66.50	3.19	Lib	2.94
ON	Oxford	PC	Hold	45.90	-9.30	Lib	-7.93
ON	Parkdale—High Park	Lib	Hold	45.56	7.88	Lib	6.65
ON	Parry Sound—Muskoka	PC	Hold	42.05	-10.52	Lib	-7.95
ON	Perth	PC	Hold	47.50	-10.97	Lib	-10.16
ON	Peterborough	PC	Hold	40.25	-4.21	Lib	-1.62
ON	Prince Edward—Hastings	PC	Hold	45.89	-7.40	Lib	-5.45
ON	Renfrew—Nipissing—Pembroke	Lib	Hold	51.72	2.48	Lib	1.63
ON	Rosedale	PC	Hold	43.96	-3.30	Lib	-4.69
ON	Sarnia	Lib	Gain	40.56	5.89	Lib	-5.50
ON	Sault Ste. Marie	Lib	Gain	47.96	12.29	Lib	-5.31
ON	Scarborough Centre	Lib	Gain	40.32	7.03	Lib	-7.02
ON	Scarborough East	PC	Hold	40.52	-6.16	Lib	-5.29
ON	Scarborough West	Lib	Gain	35.12	3.73	Lib	-4.45
ON	Simcoe North	PC	Hold	36.44	-9.98	NDP	-5.13
ON	Simcoe South	PC	Hold	43.53	-11.30	Lib	-9.81
ON	Spadina	Lib	Hold	46.79	3.62	Lib	2.39
ON	St. Catharines	PC	Hold	37.89	-8.38	Lib	-6.87
ON	St. Paul's	Lib	Gain	45.25	3.95	Lib	-4.25
ON	Stormont—Dundas	Lib	Hold	53.02	5.95	Lib	5.10
ON	Sudbury	Lib	Hold	55.70	6.17	Lib	4.61
ON	Thunder Bay—Atikokan	Lib	Hold	39.23	4.36	NDP	-0.25
ON	Thunder Bay—Nipigon	Lib	Hold	46.61	1.75	NDP	-1.17
ON	Timiskaming	Lib	Gain	41.56	3.36	Lib	-2.10
ON	Timmins—Chapleau	Lib	Hold	51.93	8.91	Lib	2.70
ON	Trinity	Lib	Hold	57.52	9.58	Lib	6.32
ON	Victoria—Haliburton	PC	Hold	48.41	-9.91	Lib	-6.57
ON	Waterloo	PC	Hold	39.99	-6.07	Lib	-5.32
ON	Welland	Lib	Hold	43.85	6.64	Lib	7.68
ON	Wellington—Dufferin—Simcoe	PC	Hold	53.77	-8.04	Lib	-5.95
ON	Willowdale	Lib	Gain	47.44	7.49	Lib	-7.43
ON	Windsor West	Lib	Hold	58.50	9.95	Lib	7.54
ON	Windsor—Walkerville	Lib	Hold	52.02	9.02	Lib	5.76
ON	York Centre	Lib	Hold	60.96	9.65	Lib	7.55
ON	York East	Lib	Gain	44.85	5.57	Lib	-5.58
ON	York North	PC	Hold	43.51	-5.38	Lib	-4.45
ON	York South—Weston	Lib	Hold	47.21	6.96	Lib	6.20
ON	York West	Lib	Hold	56.76	9.73	Lib	8.94
ON	York—Peel	PC	Hold	47.09	-9.54	Lib	-8.04
ON	York—Scarborough	Lib	Gain	47.91	7.65	Lib	-7.53
PE	Cardigan	Lib	Gain	48.18	1.51	Lib	-2.36
PE	Egmont	Lib	Gain	52.37	12.93	Lib	-13.18
PE	Hillsborough	PC	Hold	47.66	-7.33	Lib	-8.04
PE	Malpeque	PC	Hold	50.14	-2.56	Lib	-2.37
QC	Abitibi	Lib	Gain	51.05	17.76	Lib	-14.33
QC	Argenteuil	Lib	Hold	68.60	4.33	Lib	2.75
QC	Beauce	Lib	Gain	50.88	15.84	Lib	-14.47
QC	Beauharnois—Salaberry	Lib	Hold	73.14	9.26	Lib	6.28
QC	Bellechasse	Lib	Gain	51.13	7.48	Lib	-8.22
QC	Berthier—Maskinongé	Lib	Hold	52.73	-4.71	PC	-8.21
QC	Blainville—Deux-Montagnes	Lib	Hold	74.01	5.90	Lib	7.03
QC	Bonaventure—Îles-de-la-Madeleine	Lib	Hold	69.39	14.86	Lib	18.39
QC	Bourassa	Lib	Hold	76.49	13.96	N/A (Note: No Social Credit candidate in 1980.)	
QC	Chambly	Lib	Hold	69.86	6.11	Lib	5.09
QC	Champlain	Lib	Hold	64.89	11.61	N/A (Note: René Matte (Independent in 1979, coming in 2nd) chose to stand for the NDP in 1980, coming in 2nd again. NDP had fielded its own candidate in 1979, coming in 5th, thus making any swing calculation among parties anomalous.)	
QC	Charlesbourg	Lib	Hold	71.06	5.10	Lib	9.11
QC	Charlevoix	Lib	Hold	70.75	13.33	Lib	17.78
QC	Châteauguay	Lib	Hold	74.15	6.39	Lib	5.96
QC	Chicoutimi	Lib	Hold	67.52	18.05	Lib	11.70
QC	Dollard	Lib	Hold	76.45	-0.23	Lib	0.03
QC	Drummond	Lib	Hold	72.76	15.57	Lib	17.57
QC	Duvernay	Lib	Hold	72.43	4.30	Lib	7.72
QC	Frontenac	Lib	Hold	45.89	-0.24	SC	-0.50
QC	Gamelin	Lib	Hold	72.39	4.46	Lib	6.62
QC	Gaspé	Lib	Hold	60.53	8.58	Lib	8.67
QC	Gatineau	Lib	Hold	78.60	6.71	Lib	8.79
QC	Hochelaga—Maisonneuve	Lib	Hold	73.36	11.46	Lib	9.76
QC	Hull	Lib	Hold	68.13	-2.04	NDP	-5.01
QC	Joliette	PC	Hold	46.96	-3.76	Lib	-5.41
QC	Jonquière	Lib	Hold	75.02	12.31	Lib	14.77
QC	Kamouraska—Rivière-du-Loup	Lib	Hold	54.84	10.92	Lib	4.62
QC	Labelle	Lib	Hold	66.55	0.83	N/A	
QC	Lac-Saint-Jean	Lib	Hold	63.35	10.76	Lib	16.49
QC	Lachine	Lib	Hold	59.74	-3.56	PC	-2.60
QC	Langelier	Lib	Hold	71.49	4.92	Lib	6.83
QC	Laprairie	Lib	Hold	72.07	2.68	Lib	2.28
QC	Lasalle	Lib	Hold	78.23	3.15	Lib	2.61
QC	Laurier	Lib	Hold	66.66	5.96	Lib	7.56
QC	Laval	Lib	Hold	75.34	2.77	Lib	2.72
QC	Laval-des-Rapides	Lib	Hold	74.96	3.09	Lib	3.09
QC	Lévis	Lib	Hold	66.69	8.38	Lib	11.48
QC	Longueuil	Lib	Hold	68.96	7.69	Lib	9.39
QC	Lotbinière	Lib	Gain	59.11	18.77	Lib	-28.85
QC	Louis-Hébert	Lib	Hold	64.75	-1.25	Lib	6.29
QC	Manicouagan	Lib	Hold	68.65	9.66	Lib	11.50
QC	Matapédia—Matane	Lib	Hold	77.84	5.43	Lib	7.23
QC	Mégantic—Compton—Stanstead	Lib	Hold	57.21	5.60	Lib	10.88
QC	Mercier	Lib	Hold	70.55	11.62	Lib	14.74
QC	Missisquoi	Lib	Gain	53.08	9.83	Lib	-8.51
QC	Montmorency	Lib	Hold	70.11	6.52	Lib	11.13
QC	Mount Royal	Lib	Hold	81.23	-3.94	PC	-3.65
QC	Notre-Dame-de-Grâce	Lib	Hold	71.16	-1.26	PC	-0.69
QC	Outremont	Lib	Hold	71.49	-0.66	NDP	-1.37
QC	Papineau	Lib	Hold	74.69	6.21	Lib	7.29
QC	Pontiac—Gatineau—Labelle	Lib	Hold	70.39	6.62	Lib	4.13
QC	Portneuf	Lib	Hold	73.86	10.24	Lib	12.66
QC	Québec-Est	Lib	Hold	73.01	7.20	Lib	9.97
QC	Richelieu	Lib	Hold	68.15	12.29	Lib	8.63
QC	Richmond	Lib	Hold	63.67	18.35	Lib	29.13
QC	Rimouski	Lib	Gain	56.03	11.00	Lib	-14.02
QC	Roberval	Lib	Gain	51.92	11.62	Lib	-7.04
QC	Rosemont	Lib	Hold	75.86	4.86	Lib	6.07
QC	Saint-Denis	Lib	Hold	77.42	3.31	Lib	2.60
QC	Saint-Henri—Westmount	Lib	Hold	67.49	-4.08	PC	-3.83
QC	Saint-Hyacinthe	Lib	Hold	66.96	12.97	Lib	8.61
QC	Saint-Jacques	Lib	Hold	71.22	2.04	Lib	1.17
QC	Saint-Jean	Lib	Hold	72.12	7.62	Lib	12.06
QC	Saint-Léonard—Anjou	Lib	Hold	81.12	3.97	Lib	5.16
QC	Saint-Maurice	Lib	Hold	76.70	5.64	Lib	8.42
QC	Saint-Michel	Lib	Hold	75.48	4.24	Lib	5.89
QC	Sainte-Marie	Lib	Hold	68.49	9.08	Lib	8.44
QC	Shefford	Lib	Hold	68.47	17.00	Lib	9.89
QC	Sherbrooke	Lib	Hold	71.79	11.64	Lib	16.40
QC	Témiscamingue	Lib	Hold	61.02	19.70	Lib	17.44
QC	Terrebonne	Lib	Hold	68.27	5.98	Lib	9.46
QC	Trois-Rivières	Lib	Hold	68.48	7.51	N/A	
QC	Vaudreuil	Lib	Hold	72.56	2.54	Lib	2.02
QC	Verchères	Lib	Hold	68.14	5.32	Lib	4.52
QC	Verdun	Lib	Hold	75.33	3.08	Lib	2.74
SK	Assiniboia	PC	Hold	35.94	-0.65	PC	0.71
SK	Humboldt—Lake Centre	NDP	Gain	41.63	3.64	NDP	-3.17
SK	Kindersley—Lloydminster	PC	Hold	46.27	-3.07	NDP	-1.91
SK	Mackenzie	PC	Hold	41.61	-6.33	NDP	-4.23
SK	Moose Jaw	PC	Hold	46.42	-2.09	NDP	-1.45
SK	Prince Albert	NDP	Gain	34.80	-0.88	NDP	-7.81
SK	Qu'Appelle—Moose Mountain	PC	Hold	49.57	-4.26	NDP	-4.62
SK	Regina East	NDP	Hold	36.83	0.28	PC	-1.11
SK	Regina West	NDP	Hold	42.20	-0.21	PC	-0.78
SK	Saskatoon East	NDP	Hold	34.51	-2.38	PC	-1.58
SK	Saskatoon West	PC	Hold	43.33	-2.84	NDP	-2.39
SK	Swift Current—Maple Creek	PC	Hold	47.97	-4.30	NDP	-2.65
SK	The Battlefords—Meadow Lake	NDP	Gain	35.80	0.19	NDP	-2.03
SK	Yorkton—Melville	NDP	Hold	45.69	-1.79	PC	-3.36
Terr	Nunatsiaq	NDP	Hold	47.27	9.53	NDP	2.00
Terr	Western Arctic	PC	Hold	33.81	-1.35	Lib	-0.38
Terr	Yukon	PC	Hold	40.60	0.02	Lib	-1.59

== Regional analysis ==
The national tables above are broken down as follows:

=== Maritimes ===
Change in popular vote by party (1980 vs 1979)
Party	1980	1979	Change (pp)
█ Liberal	45.07%	39.81%	5.26
█ Progressive Conservative	36.62%	41.00%	-4.38
█ New Democratic	17.61%	18.98%	-1.37
█ Rhinoceros	0.25%	0.00%	0.25
█ Other	0.45%	0.21%	0.24

Party candidates in 2nd place
Party in 1st place	1980				1979			
Party in 1st place	Party in 2nd place			Total	Party in 2nd place			Total
Party in 1st place	Lib	PC	NDP	Total	Lib	PC	NDP	Total
Liberal		16	3	19		9	3	12
Progressive Conservative	13			13	18			18
New Democratic				–	2			2
Total	13	16	3	32	20	9	3	32

Party rankings (1st to 5th place)
Party	1980					1979				
Party	1st	2nd	3rd	4th	5th	1st	2nd	3rd	4th	5th
Liberal	19	13				12	20			
Progressive Conservative	13	16	3			18	9	5		
New Democratic		3	29			2	3	27		
Independent				12	4				5	1
Marxist–Leninist				4	2				1	
Rhinoceros				4	1					
Libertarian					2				1	
Communist										1

=== Quebec ===
Change in popular vote by party (1980 vs 1979)
Party	1980	1979	Change (pp)
█ Liberal	68.21%	61.66%	6.55
█ Progressive Conservative	12.62%	13.49%	-0.87
█ New Democratic	9.08%	5.10%	3.98
█ Social Credit	5.90%	16.01%	-10.11
█ Rhinoceros	2.99%	1.93%	1.06
█ Parti nationaliste	0.49%	0.61%	-0.12
█ Other	0.70%	1.20%	-0.50

Party candidates in 2nd place
Party in 1st place	1980						1979					
Party in 1st place	Party in 2nd place					Total	Party in 2nd place					Total
Party in 1st place	Lib	PC	NDP	SC	Rhino	Total	Lib	PC	NDP	SC	Ind	Total
Liberal		29	35	8	2	74		27	2	37	1	67
Progressive Conservative	1					1	2					2
Social Credit						–	6					6
Total	1	29	35	8	2	75	8	27	2	37	1	75

Party rankings (1st to 5th place)
Party	1980					1979				
Party	1st	2nd	3rd	4th	5th	1st	2nd	3rd	4th	5th
Liberal	74	1				67	8			
Progressive Conservative	1	29	40	5		2	27	38	8	
New Democratic		35	29	6	3		2	14	48	10
Social Credit		8	5	18	24	6	37	20	10	1
Rhinoceros		2	1	39	20			1	6	47
Union populaire				6	5					14
Independent				1	11		1	2	2	
Marxist–Leninist					8					2
Libertarian					4					

=== Ontario ===
Change in popular vote by party (1980 vs 1979)
Party	1980	1979	Change (pp)
█ Liberal	41.90%	36.44%	5.46
█ Progressive Conservative	35.49%	41.82%	-6.33
█ New Democratic	21.84%	21.08%	0.76
█ Rhinoceros	0.17%	0.01%	0.16
█ Other	0.00%	0.65%	-0.65

Party candidates in 2nd place
Party in 1st place	1980				1979			
Party in 1st place	Party in 2nd place (Note: Liberals and PCs tied for second place in Beaches.)			Total	Party in 2nd place			Total
Party in 1st place	PC	Lib	NDP	Total	PC	Lib	NDP	Total
Progressive Conservative		37	1	38		54	3	57
Liberal	30		22	52	17		15	32
New Democratic	4	2		6	3	3		6
Total	34	39	23	96	20	57	18	95

Party rankings (1st to 5th place)
Party	1980					1979				
Party	1st	2nd	3rd	4th	5th	1st	2nd	3rd	4th	5th
Liberal	52	39	4			32	57	6		
Progressive Conservative	38	34	23			57	20	18		
New Democratic	5	23	67			6	18	71		
Libertarian				37	10				45	2
Rhinoceros				15	5					2
Marxist–Leninist				14	28				9	25
Communist				7	8				7	14
Independent				6	6				8	10
Social Credit				4	1				3	2

=== Manitoba/Saskatchewan ===
Change in popular vote by party (1980 vs 1979)
Party	1980	1979	Change (pp)
█ Progressive Conservative	38.32%	42.32%	-4.00
█ New Democratic	34.86%	34.18%	0.68
█ Liberal	26.16%	22.63%	3.53
█ Rhinoceros	0.25%	0%	0.25
█ Other	0.41%	0.87%	-0.46

Party candidates in 2nd place
Party in 1st place	1980				1979			
Party in 1st place	Party in 2nd place			Total	Party in 2nd place			Total
Party in 1st place	PC	Lib	NDP	Total	PC	Lib	NDP	Total
New Democratic	10	4		14	8	1		9
Progressive Conservative		4	8	12		2	15	17
Liberal	2			2	2			2
Total	12	8	8	28	10	3	15	28

Party rankings (1st to 5th place)
Party	1980					1979				
Party	1st	2nd	3rd	4th	5th	1st	2nd	3rd	4th	5th
New Democratic	14	8	6			9	15	4		
Progressive Conservative	12	12	4			17	10	1		
Liberal	2	8	18			2	3	23		
Rhinoceros				7						
Independent				6	1				3	2
Marxist–Leninist				5	8				2	7
Communist				3					3	1
Social Credit				1		9	15	4		
Libertarian					1					

=== Alberta ===
Change in popular vote by party (1980 vs 1979)
Party	1980	1979	Change (pp)
█ Progressive Conservative	64.74%	65.59%	-0.85
█ Liberal	22.15%	22.07%	0.08
█ New Democratic	10.26%	9.87%	0.39
█ Social Credit	1.69%	0.96%	0.73
█ Rhinoceros	0.70%	0%	0.70
█ Other	0.47%	1.51%	-1.04

Party candidates in 2nd place
Party in 1st place	1980	1979		
Party in 1st place	Lib	Lib	Ind	Total
Progressive Conservative	21	20	1	21

Party rankings (1st to 5th place)
Party	1980					1979				
Party	1st	2nd	3rd	4th	5th	1st	2nd	3rd	4th	5th
Progressive Conservative	21					21				
Liberal		21					20	1		
New Democratic			21					20	1	
Social Credit				8	5				8	1
Rhinoceros				6	2					
Independent				5	3		1		3	1
Marxist–Leninist				1		2			1	3
Communist					2				3	3
Libertarian										1

=== British Columbia ===
Change in popular vote by party (1980 vs 1979)
Party	1980	1979	Change (pp)
█ Progressive Conservative	41.50%	44.35%	-2.85
█ New Democratic	35.28%	31.92%	3.36
█ Liberal	22.17%	22.99%	-0.82
█ Rhinoceros	0.41%	0.03%	0.38
█ Other	0.48%	0.71%	-0.23

Party candidates in 2nd place
Party in 1st place	1980				1979			
Party in 1st place	Party in 2nd place			Total	Party in 2nd place			Total
Party in 1st place	PC	NDP	Lib	Total	PC	NDP	Lib	Total
Progressive Conservative		12	4	16		13	6	19
New Democratic	9		3	12	5		3	8
Liberal				–	1			1
Total	9	12	7	28	6	13	9	28

Party rankings (1st to 5th place)
Party	1980					1979				
Party	1st	2nd	3rd	4th	5th	1st	2nd	3rd	4th	5th
Progressive Conservative	16	9	3			19	6	3		
New Democratic	12	12	4			8	13	7		
Liberal		7	21			1	19	18		
Communist				4	6				8	4
Social Credit				4	1				3	
Marxist–Leninist				3	4				2	7
Independent				3	1				7	1
Libertarian									2	
Rhinoceros									1	

=== Territories ===
Change in popular vote by party (1980 vs 1979)
Party	1980	1979	Change (pp)
█ Liberal	37.21%	35.02%	2.19
█ New Democratic	31.47%	28.38%	3.09
█ Progressive Conservative	30.63%	35.62%	-4.99
█ Rhinoceros	0.70%	0%	0.70
█ Other	0%	0.98%	-0.98

Party candidates in 2nd place
Party in 1st place	1980			1979
Party in 1st place	Lib	NDP	Total	Lib
Progressive Conservative	1	1	2	2
New Democratic	1		1	1
Total	2	1	3	3
