= Gerry St. Germain =

Canadian politician (born 1937)

The Honourable Gerry St. Germain PC

Minister of State (Forestry)
- In office September 15, 1988 – December 7, 1988
- Prime Minister: Brian Mulroney
- Preceded by: Gerald Merrithew
- Succeeded by: Frank Oberle

Minister of State (Transport)
- In office March 31, 1988 – September 15, 1988
- Prime Minister: Brian Mulroney
- Preceded by: Monique Vézina
- Succeeded by: Shirley Martin

Canadian Senator from British Columbia
- In office June 23, 1993 – November 6, 2012
- Appointed by: Brian Mulroney

Member of Parliament for Mission—Port Moody
- In office August 29, 1983 – November 21, 1988
- Preceded by: Mark Rose
- Succeeded by: Riding abolished

Personal details
- Born: November 6, 1937 (age 88) Winnipeg, Manitoba, Canada
- Party: Conservative (2003–present)
- Other political affiliations: Progressive Conservative (until 2000); Independent Conservative (2000); Alliance (2000–2003)

Gerry St. Germain PC (born November 6, 1937) is a former Canadian politician. St. Germain served as a Conservative senator for British Columbia and previously served as a Member of Parliament.

== Early life and career ==
Born in Manitoba of Metis descent, he moved to British Columbia. St. Germain had various jobs prior to entering politics, working variously as a Royal Canadian Air Force pilot, police officer (Winnipeg and Vancouver Police Departments), building contractor, businessman and poultry farmer.

== Member of Parliament ==
A strong Tory supporter, St. Germain was parachuted as a Progressive Conservative into the Mission-Port Moody riding for the byelection there in 1983. St. Germain was elected as a Member of Parliament in the House of Commons of Canada at a by-election held on the same day in 1983 that Brian Mulroney was elected.

St. Germain was Member of Parliament for the now defunct riding of Mission—Port Moody from then until 1988. In March 1988, St. Germain joined the Canadian Cabinet as Minister of Transport (Canada) and was later appointed as Minister of Forestry. He was also the political minister for BC at this time.

After his riding's boundaries were changed to create the new riding of Mission-Coquitlam, St. Germain was defeated in the 1988 general election by Joy Langan. From 1989 to 1995, he was the President of the Progressive Conservative Party of Canada.

== Senate career ==
In June 1993, he was appointed to the Senate of Canada just prior to Mulroney's retirement as Prime Minister of Canada. He chose to adopt the division of Langley-Pemberton-Whistler; such Senate divisions are merely symbolic outside Quebec. In 1998, while still a Progressive Conservative, St. Germain explored the United Alternative option, formed by Reform Party of Canada leader Preston Manning, which was an attempt to unite the right. In June 2000, he sat as an Independent Conservative senator, and in October 2000 he became the only Canadian Alliance senator. Since the Canadian Alliance formed the Official Opposition in the House of Commons, St. Germain argued that he should be the Leader of the Official Opposition in the Senate, but his arguments were rejected by the Speaker. At the request of Canadian Alliance Leader Stephen Harper, St. Germain led the negotiations to unite the Canadian Alliance and the Progressive Conservative Party. When the two parties merged in December 2003, St. Germain became a member of the Conservative Party of Canada. On 6 November 2012, St. Germain reached the Senate's mandatory retirement age, 75.

Gerry St. Germain was listed as the top spender for expenses in the Canadian Senate spending $378,292 in one year according to a National Post article.

Preceded by Mark Rose	Member of Parliament for Mission—Port Moody; 1984–1988	Succeeded by Riding abolished
