= Robin Richardson =

Canadian politician

Leader of the Vancouver Island Party
- In office June 16, 2016 – November 15, 2019
- Preceded by: First leader
- Succeeded by: Vacant

Member of Parliament for Beaches
- In office 1979–1980
- Preceded by: New riding
- Succeeded by: Neil Young

Personal details
- Born: June 26, 1942 (age 84) Vancouver, British Columbia, Canada
- Party: Conservative (federal); Vancouver Island Party (provincial, until 2020)
- Other political affiliations: Progressive Conservative (until 2000); Alliance (2000–2003)
- Profession: Economist

Robin Mark Richardson (born June 26, 1942) is a Canadian former politician who was a Progressive Conservative member of the House of Commons of Canada. He represented the riding of Beaches from 1979 to 1980. He was the founder and leader of the Vancouver Island Party.

== Career ==
Richardson is an economist by profession and once worked with the Fraser Institute. At one time, he was a minister for a Christian church in Esquimalt.

Richardson represented Ontario's Beaches electoral district which he won in the 1979 federal election. After serving his only term, the 31st Canadian Parliament, he was defeated in the 1980 federal election by Neil Young of the New Democratic Party.

In September 2000, he unsuccessfully challenged incumbent Esquimalt—Juan de Fuca Member of Parliament Keith Martin for the Canadian Alliance nomination in that riding. Richardson was particularly critical of Martin's pro-choice position on abortion, while Martin had finished in fourth place during the Canadian Alliance leadership campaign earlier that year. Richardson managed Stockwell Day's successful leadership campaign within Esquimalt—Juan de Fuca.

In June 2016, he founded the Vancouver Island Party with the goal of advocating Vancouver Island provincehood in the BC Legislative Assembly. The party was disbanded in 2020.

== Electoral record ==
1979 Canadian federal election
Party	Candidate	Votes	%
Progressive Conservative	Robin Richardson	12,840	34.5
New Democratic	Neil Young	12,322	33.1
Liberal	Brian Fullerton	11,232	30.2
Libertarian	David Anderson	388	1.0
Independent	Donald A. Daley	129	0.3
Rhinoceros	Judi Skuce	111	0.3
Marxist–Leninist	Jim McKibbin	91	0.2
Independent	Jim McMillan	69	0.2
Turnout		37,182	100.0
Parliament of Canada:

1980 Canadian federal election
Party	Candidate	Votes	%
New Democratic	Neil Young	12,675	35.6
Liberal	Terry O'Reilly	11,179	31.4
Progressive Conservative	Robin Richardson	11,179	31.4
Libertarian	Dennis Corrigan	272	0.8
Rhinoceros	David Reid	214	0.6
Marxist–Leninist	Jim McKibbin	60	0.2
Independent	Vince Corriero	45	0.1
Turnout		35,624	100.0
Parliament of Canada:

British Columbia provincial by-election, January 30, 2019: Nanaimo
Party	Candidate	Votes	%	±%	Expenditures
New Democratic	Sheila Malcolmson	12,114	49.92	+3.38	$50,194
Liberal	Tony Harris	9,691	39.93	+7.39	$57,212
Green	Michele Ney	1,783	7.35	−12.56	$41,039
Conservative	Justin Greenwood	491	2.02	–	$1,432
Vancouver Island Party	Robin Mark Richardson	112	0.46	–	$4,208
Libertarian	Bill Walker	76	0.32	−0.69	$246
Total valid votes		24,267	100.00	–	
Total rejected ballots		33	0.14	−0.36	
Turnout		24,300	52.59	−8.68	
Registered voters		46,210			
New Democratic hold		Swing		−2.01	
Source: Elections BC
