= Mission—Coquitlam =

Former federal electoral district in British Columbia, Canada

British Columbia electoral district

Defunct federal electoral district
- Legislature: House of Commons
- District created: 1987
- District abolished: 1996
- First contested: 1988
- Last contested: 1993

Mission—Coquitlam was a federal electoral district in British Columbia, Canada, that was represented in the House of Commons of Canada from 1988 to 1997. This riding was created in 1987 from parts of Mission—Port Moody riding.

It was abolished in 1996 when it was merged into Dewdney—Alouette riding.

It consisted of:

- the Dewdney-Alouette Regional District;
- the part of Coquitlam District Municipality lying east of the Coquitlam River;
- the part of the City of Port Coquitlam lying north and east of the Canadian Pacific Railway right-of way.

== Members of Parliament ==
Parliament	Years	Member	Party
Riding created from Mission—Port Moody
34th	1988–1993	Joy Langan	New Democratic
35th	1993–1997	Daphne Jennings	Reform
Riding dissolved into Dewdney—Alouette

== Election results ==
1993 Canadian federal election
Party	Candidate	Votes	%	±%
Reform	Daphne Jennings	20,168	36.71	+35.01
Liberal	Mae Cabott	14,774	26.89	+13.80
New Democratic	Joy Langan	9,210	16.76	–26.99
Progressive Conservative	A.M. Sandy MacDougall	6,445	11.73	–27.77
National	Mike Shields	2,739	4.99	–
Christian Heritage	Tim Bonner	479	0.87	–0.71
Green	Rose Bennett	397	0.72	–
Natural Law	Matt Deacon	294	0.54	–
Libertarian	D'Arcy James Flannery	228	0.42	+0.04
Independent	E. Chum Richardson	135	0.25	–
Independent	Stephen Clews	67	0.12	–
Total valid votes		54,936	99.56	
Total rejected ballots		242	0.44	+0.22
Turnout		55,178	67.78	–13.62
Eligible voters		81,410		
Reform gain from New Democratic		Swing		+31.00
Source: Elections Canada

1988 Canadian federal election
Party	Candidate	Votes	%	±%
New Democratic	Joy Langan	22,259	43.75	–
Progressive Conservative	Gerry St. Germain	20,097	39.50	–
Liberal	Mae Cabott	6,660	13.09	–
Reform	Donald Sherling	864	1.70	–
Christian Heritage	Donna Pickering	807	1.59	–
Libertarian	Lewis C. Dahlby	190	0.37	–
Total valid votes		50,877	99.78	
Total rejected ballots		113	0.22	–
Turnout		50,990	81.40	–
Eligible voters		62,641		
New Democratic notional gain from Progressive Conservative		Swing		–
This riding was created from parts of Mission—Port Moody, where Progressive Conservative Gerry St. Germain was the incumbent.
Source: Elections Canada

== See also ==
- List of Canadian electoral districts
- Historical federal electoral districts of Canada
