= Daphne Jennings =

Canadian politician

Member of the House of Commons of Canada for Mission—Coquitlam
- In office 25 October 1993 – 1 June 1997
- Preceded by: Joy Langan
- Succeeded by: constituency abolished

Personal details
- Born: January 26, 1939 (age 86); North Vancouver, British Columbia
- Political party: Reform

Daphne G. Jennings (born 26 January 1939 in North Vancouver, British Columbia) was a Canadian teacher and member of the House of Commons of Canada from 1993 to 1997.

She was elected as a Reform party candidate at the Mission—Coquitlam electoral district in the 1993 federal election. After serving in the 35th Canadian Parliament, Jennings did not seek a second term in Parliament and left federal politics after the 1997 election.
