= Coquitlam-Moody =

Defunct provincial electoral district in British Columbia, Canada

Coquitlam-Moody was a provincial electoral district in the Canadian province of British Columbia from 1979 to 1986. Its predecessor riding was Coquitlam and was redistributed into Port Coquitlam, Port Moody-Burnaby Mountain, and Coquitlam-Maillardville ridings.

== Electoral history ==
Note: Winners in each election are in bold.

32nd British Columbia election, 1979
Party	Candidate	Votes	%	±	Expenditures
Progressive Conservative	Orest Peter Jakubec	762	3.69%		unknown
Social Credit	Leslie Richard Keen	7,915	38.37%	–	unknown
New Democratic	**Stewart Malcolm Leggatt**	**11,919**	**57.78%**		unknown
North American Labour Party	Calvin Alphonso Segur	33	0.16%		unknown
Total valid votes		20,629	100.00%		
Total rejected ballots		223			
Turnout		%			

33rd British Columbia election, 1983
Party	Candidate	Votes	%	±	Expenditures
**New Democrat**	**Mark Rose**	**14,717**	**51.81%**		unknown
Liberal	William Watson Stewart	1,010	3.55%	–	unknown
Social Credit	Douglas William Geoffrey Whitehead	12,680	44.64%	–	unknown
Total valid votes		28,407	100.00%		
Total rejected ballots		267			
Turnout		%			

34th British Columbia election, 1986
Party	Candidate	Votes	%	±	Expenditures
Social Credit	Darrell V. Anderson	13,278	43.37%	–	unknown
Liberal	Charles A. Papps	1,819	5.94%	–	unknown
New Democratic	**Mark Rose**	**15,521**	**50.69%**		unknown
Total valid votes		30,618	100.00%		
Total rejected ballots		364			
Turnout		%			
