= Stuart Leggatt =

Canadian politician

Stuart Malcolm Leggatt
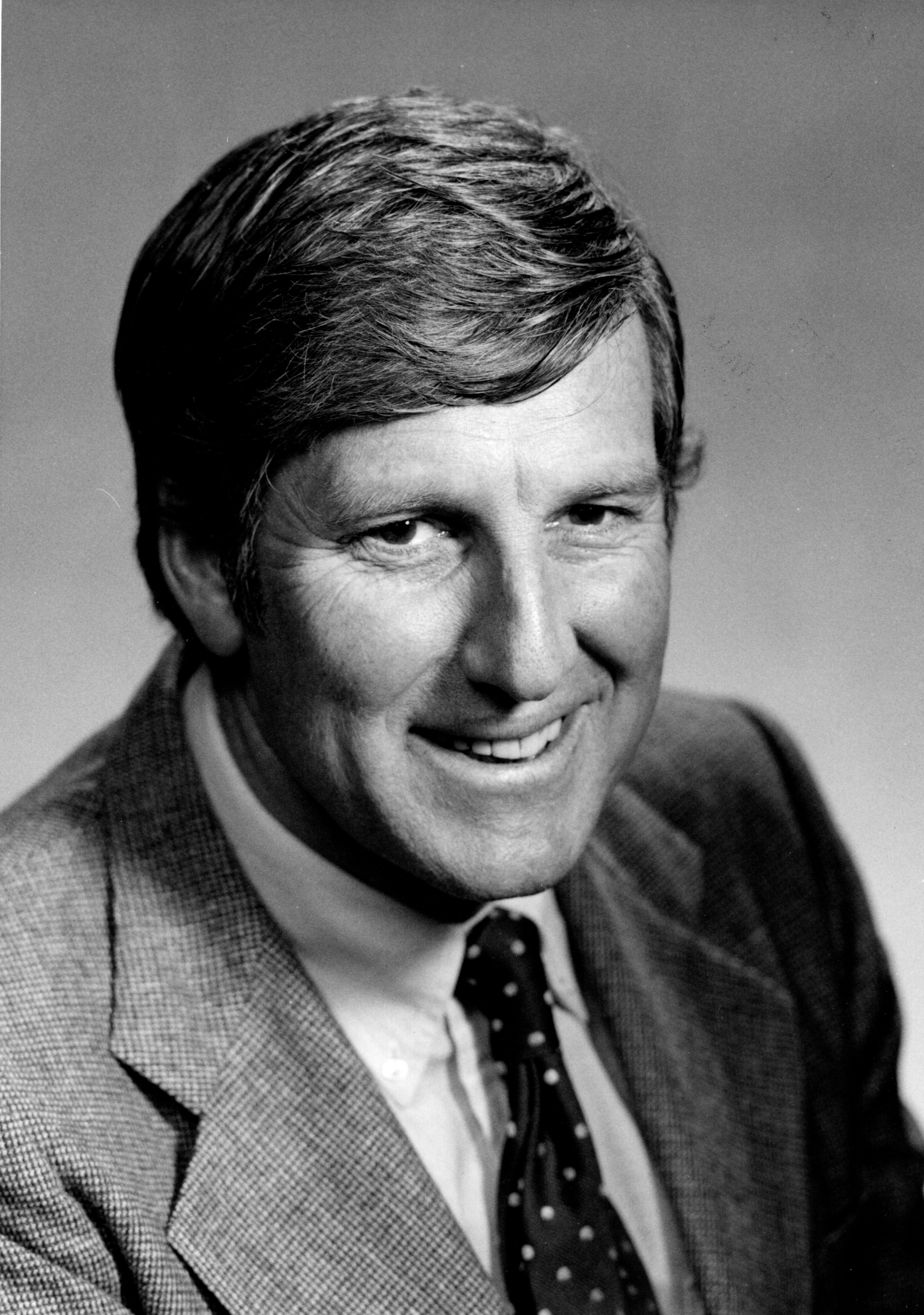

Member of the Legislative Assembly of British Columbia for Coquitlam-Moody
- In office 1979–1983
- Preceded by: The riding was created in 1979.
- Succeeded by: Mark Rose

Member of the Canadian Parliament for New Westminster
- In office 1972–1979
- Preceded by: Douglas Hogarth
- Succeeded by: The riding was abolished in 1976.

Personal details
- Born: November 9, 1931 New Westminster, British Columbia, Canada
- Died: September 21, 2002 (aged 70)
- Party: New Democratic Party
- Other political affiliations: New Democratic Party of British Columbia
- Portfolio: N.D.P. Caucus Chair (1976)

Stuart Malcolm Leggatt (November 9, 1931 – September 21, 2002) was a Canadian politician and judge.

== Early life and education ==
Leggatt was born November 9, 1931 in New Westminster, British Columbia.

He received a Bachelor of Arts degree from the University of British Columbia and a law degree in 1954. He began practising law in 1956 and law in Port Coquitlam and Vancouver, a practise he continued for 16 years.

In 1956, Leggatt married Marlene Duerksen, with whom he had three children.

== Political career ==
In 1960, Leggatt was elected as a school board trustee in Port Coquitlam. He held the role for nine years, including two as chairman.

Leggatt ran as the B.C. NDP candidate in the riding of Dewdney in the 1969 provincial election but was defeated by George Mussallem. That same year, he was elected as an alderman in Port Coquitlam.

Leggatt was elected to the House of Commons of Canada for the riding of New Westminster in the 1972 federal election as a member of the NDP. He was re-elected in the 1974 election, one of only two NDP candidates elected in B.C. He did not run for re-election in the 1979 election.

Leggatt switched to provincial politics and, in the 1979 B.C. election, he was elected as the member of the Legislative Assembly for the riding of Coquitlam-Moody.

== Post-political career ==
In 1983, Leggatt left politics to become a county judge. He had been offered a position on the Supreme Court of British Columbia in 1979, but had turned it down. He was appointed to the B.C. Supreme Court in 1990. He retired from the bench in May 2000.

Leggatt died September 21, 2002, from complications following a stroke.

== Archives ==
There is a Stuart Leggatt fonds at Library and Archives Canada. Archival reference number is R3293.
