= Mark Rose (politician) =

Canadian politician

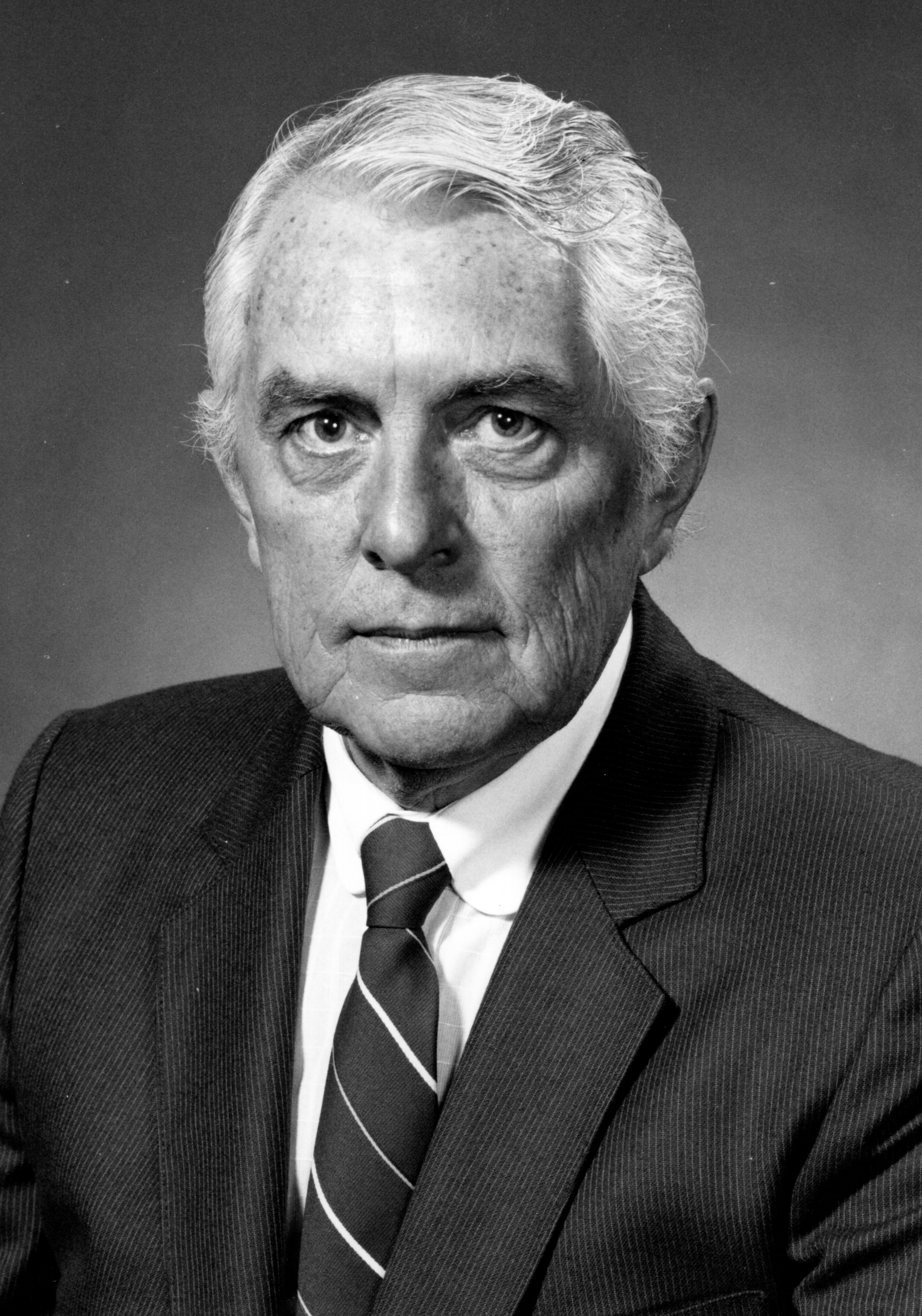

Member of Parliament for Fraser Valley West
- In office June 25, 1968 – July 8, 1974
- Preceded by: Riding created
- Succeeded by: Robert Wenman

Member of Parliament for Mission—Port Moody
- In office May 22, 1979 – April 20, 1983
- Preceded by: Riding created
- Succeeded by: Gerry St. Germain

Member of the Legislative Assembly of British Columbia for Coquitlam-Moody
- In office May 5, 1983 – October 17, 1991
- Preceded by: Stewart Malcolm Leggatt
- Succeeded by: Riding abolished

Personal details
- Born: Mark Willson Rose; March 5, 1924
- Died: March 8, 2008 (aged 84)
- Party: New Democratic Party
- Profession: Professor

Mark Willson Rose (5 March 1924 – 8 March 2008) was a New Democratic Party politician in Canada, active on both the federal and provincial levels. He was a professor by career.

He first became a member of the House of Commons of Canada at the Fraser Valley West electoral district which he won in the 1968 federal election. Rose made an earlier, unsuccessful attempt at the Fraser Valley riding in 1965. He served two terms in the 28th and 29th Canadian Parliaments before being defeated by Robert Wenman of the Progressive Conservative party in the 1974 election.

Rose returned to Canadian Parliament in the 1979 federal election with a victory at the Mission—Port Moody electoral district. After a term in the 31st Canadian Parliament, he was re-elected in 1980 but resigned from his seat before completing his term in the 32nd Canadian Parliament to campaign in the British Columbia provincial election. He won his campaign for the Coquitlam-Moody riding and was a member of that province's Legislative Assembly until 1991.
