= Neil Young (politician) =

Canadian politician (1936–2015)

Member of Parliament for Beaches-Woodbine
- In office 1988–1993
- Preceded by: New riding
- Succeeded by: Maria Minna

Member of Parliament for Beaches
- In office 1980–1988
- Preceded by: Robin Richardson
- Succeeded by: Riding abolished

Personal details
- Born: August 28, 1936 Edinburgh, Scotland
- Died: March 7, 2015 (aged 78) Toronto, Ontario, Canada
- Party: New Democrat
- Spouse: Vivien
- Children: 4
- Profession: Machinist, consultant

Neil Young (August 28, 1936 – March 7, 2015) was a Canadian politician. He was a New Democratic member of the Canadian parliament from 1980 to 1993. He represented the downtown Toronto ridings of Beaches and Beaches-Woodbine.

== Background ==
Young was born in Edinburgh, Scotland, in 1936. He emigrated to Canada in the 1950s and worked as a machinist in the electrical industry. He later became an organizer for the United Electrical Workers Union. After leaving politics he worked as a consultant on people with disabilities. He and his wife Vivien raised four children. He died on March 7, 2015, in Toronto.

== Politics ==
He ran unsuccessfully for Toronto City Council's Ward 9 in 1976. He came in 6th place behind winners Pat Sheppard and Tom Wardle Jr. In a closely contested nomination race, he won the NDP nomination for the Beaches federal electoral district by two votes in 1977. In the federal election of 1979 he lost narrowly to Progressive Conservative candidate Robin Richardson by 518 votes. The PC's won and Richardson served in the short lived Joe Clark minority government. In 1980, Young faced Richardson again, this time defeating him by 1,496 votes. He represented the electoral districts of Beaches from 1980 to 1988, and Beaches—Woodbine from 1988 to 1993, in the House of Commons of Canada as a member of the New Democratic Party (NDP). Young served as the NDP critic on several portfolios such as pensions and veteran's affairs. He was the party's whip from 1981 to 1984.

He was defeated in the 1993 election by Liberal Party of Canada candidate Maria Minna.

== Electoral record ==
1993 Canadian federal election: Beaches—Woodbine
Party	Candidate	Votes	%	±%
Liberal	Maria Minna	17,582	40.0	+6.7
New Democratic	Neil Young	8,151	18.5	-16.6
Reform	Hugh Prendergast	6,773	15.4	
Progressive Conservative	Denise Cole	4,693	10.7	-18.6
Independent	Terry Kelly	4,525	10.3	
National	John-Frederick Cameron	1,214	2.8	
Green	Leane Haze	357	0.8	+0.1
Natural Law	Donalda Fredeen	276	0.6	
Independent	Keith Meadowcroft	195	0.4	
Abolitionist	Zahid Tirmizi	120	0.3	
Marxist–Leninist	Pierre Chénier	96	0.2	
Total valid votes		43,982	100.0	

1988 Canadian federal election: Beaches—Woodbine
Party	Candidate	Votes	%
New Democratic	Neil Young	15,760	35.2
Liberal	Terry Kelly	14,900	33.2
Progressive Conservative	Jim O'Malley	13,107	29.2
Libertarian	Dennis Corrigan	351	0.8
Green	Michael Tegtmeyer	317	0.7
Independent	Ronald Clifford	259	0.6
Independent	Wally Pearson	71	0.2
Commonwealth of Canada	Charles Odell	48	0.1
Total valid votes		44,813	100.0

1984 Canadian federal election
Party	Candidate	Votes	%
New Democratic	Neil Young	14,914	40.6
Progressive Conservative	Jack Jones	12,443	33.9
Liberal	Terry Kelly	8,155	22.2
Green	Trevor Hancock	581	1.6
Libertarian	Dennis Corrigan	353	1.0
Independent	Terrence Kennedy	132	0.4
Independent	John Turmel	112	0.3
Commonwealth of Canada	Ron Thorsen	27	0.1
Turnout		36,177	100.0
Parliament of Canada:

1980 Canadian federal election
Party	Candidate	Votes	%
New Democratic	Neil Young	12,675	35.6
Liberal	Terry O'Reilly	11,179	31.4
Progressive Conservative	Robin Richardson	11,179	31.4
Libertarian	Dennis Corrigan	272	0.8
Rhinoceros	David Reid	214	0.6
Marxist–Leninist	Jim McKibbin	60	0.2
Independent	Vince Corriero	45	0.1
Turnout		35,624	100.0
Parliament of Canada:

1979 Canadian federal election
Party	Candidate	Votes	%
Progressive Conservative	Robin Richardson	12,840	34.5
New Democratic	Neil Young	12,322	33.1
Liberal	Brian Fullerton	11,232	30.2
Libertarian	David Anderson	388	1.0
Independent	Donald A. Daley	129	0.3
Rhinoceros	Judi Skuce	111	0.3
Marxist–Leninist	Jim McKibbin	91	0.2
Independent	Jim McMillan	69	0.2
Turnout		37,182	100.0
Parliament of Canada:
