= Mission—Port Moody =

Former federal electoral district in British Columbia, Canada

British Columbia electoral district

Defunct federal electoral district
- Legislature: House of Commons
- District created: 1976
- District abolished: 1987
- First contested: 1979
- Last contested: 1984

Mission—Port Moody was a federal electoral district in British Columbia, Canada, that was represented in the House of Commons of Canada from 1979 to 1988. This riding was created in 1976 from parts of Fraser Valley East and Fraser Valley West ridings.

It was abolished in 1987 when it was redistributed into Mission—Coquitlam and Port Moody—Coquitlam ridings.

It consisted of:

- the Dewdney-Alouette Regional District;
- the northwestern part of the Greater Vancouver Regional District.

== Members of Parliament ==
Parliament	Years	Member	Party
Riding created from Fraser Valley East and Fraser Valley West
31st	1979–1980	Mark Rose	New Democratic
32nd	1980–1983	Mark Rose	New Democratic
32nd	1983–1984	Gerry St. Germain	Progressive Conservative
33rd	1984–1988	Gerry St. Germain	Progressive Conservative
Riding dissolved into Mission—Coquitlam and Port Moody—Coquitlam

== Election results ==
1984 Canadian federal election
Party	Candidate	Votes	%	±%
Progressive Conservative	Gerry St. Germain	30,678	47.53	–3.13
New Democratic	Tom Beardsley	25,925	40.17	–2.80
Liberal	Mae Cabott	7,071	10.96	+5.78
Green	Richard Hennick	540	0.84	–
Social Credit	Peggy Brown	327	0.51	–
Total valid votes		64,541	99.83	
Total rejected ballots		107	0.17	–
Turnout		64,648	79.74	–
Eligible voters		81,073		
Progressive Conservative hold		Swing		–0.16
Source: Elections Canada

Canadian federal by-election, 29 August 1983 On the resignation of Mark Rose, 21 April 1983
Party	Candidate	Votes	%	±%
Progressive Conservative	Gerry St. Germain	21,590	50.66	+14.66
New Democratic	Sophie Weremchuk	18,314	42.97	–4.22
Liberal	Louis Duprat	2,207	5.18	–10.60
Not affiliated	Betty Nickerson	508	1.19	–
Total valid votes		42,619	100.00	
Total rejected ballots		–		
Turnout		42,619	–	–
Eligible voters				
Progressive Conservative gain from New Democratic		Swing		+9.44
Source: Elections Canada

1980 Canadian federal election
Party	Candidate	Votes	%	±%
New Democratic	Mark Rose	23,224	47.19	+3.36
Progressive Conservative	Bill Otway	17,715	36.00	–2.87
Liberal	Tom Spraggs	7,762	15.77	–1.21
Social Credit	Michael Sulyma	358	0.73	–
Communist	James William Beynon	150	0.30	–0.01
Total valid votes		49,209	99.77	
Total rejected ballots		114	0.23	+0.03
Turnout		49,323	73.57	–3.03
Eligible voters		67,044		
New Democratic hold		Swing		+3.12
Source: Elections Canada

1979 Canadian federal election
Party	Candidate	Votes	%	±%
New Democratic	Mark Rose	20,847	43.83	–
Progressive Conservative	Jack Campbell	18,486	38.87	–
Liberal	Tom Spraggs	8,078	16.98	–
Communist	James William Beynon	152	0.32	–
Total valid votes		47,563	99.80	
Total rejected ballots		97	0.20	–
Turnout		47,660	76.60	–
Eligible voters		62,223		
New Democratic notional gain from Progressive Conservative		Swing		–
This riding was created from parts of Fraser Valley East and Fraser Valley West, both of which elected a Progressive Conservative in the previous election.
Source: Elections Canada

== See also ==
- List of Canadian electoral districts
- Historical federal electoral districts of Canada
