= Beaches (federal electoral district) =

Former federal electoral district in Ontario, Canada

Ontario electoral district
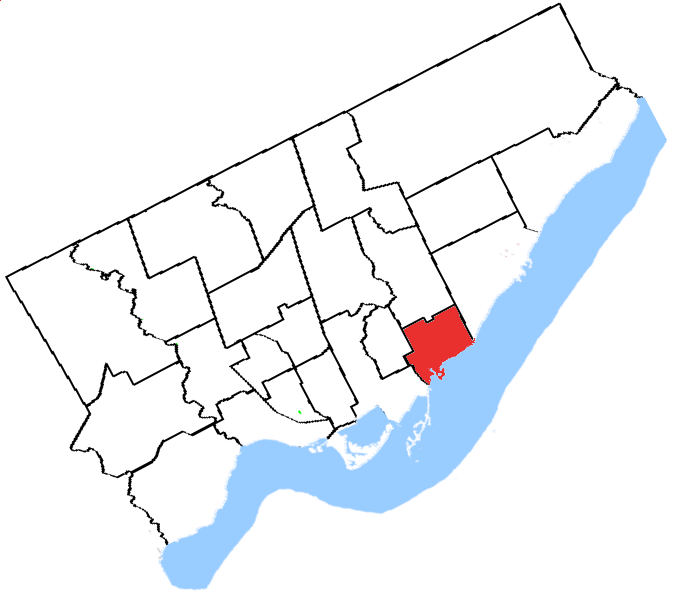
- Beaches in relation to other electoral districts in Toronto

Defunct federal electoral district
- Legislature: House of Commons
- District created: 1976
- District abolished: 1987
- First contested: 1979
- Last contested: 1988

Demographics
- Census division(s): Toronto
- Census subdivision(s): Toronto

Beaches was a federal electoral district in Toronto, Ontario, Canada, represented in the House of Commons of Canada from 1979 to 1988.

The riding was created in 1976, from parts of Broadview, Greenwood and York East ridings.

== Boundaries ==
It was created in 1976 with the following boundaries - from Leslie Street where it meets Lake Ontario, the boundary proceeded north along Leslie to Queen Street East. It went west along Queen to Jones Avenue then north along Jones to Gerrard Street East, east along Gerrard and then north on Greenwood Avenue to the city limits. It followed the city limits east to Victoria Park Avenue and then south following Victoria Park back to the lake.

The electoral district was abolished in 1987 when it was redistributed between Beaches—Woodbine and Broadview—Greenwood ridings.

== Members of Parliament ==
Parliament	Years	Member	Party
Riding created from Broadview, Greenwood and York East
31st	1979–1980	Robin Richardson	Progressive Conservative
32nd	1980–1984	Neil Young	New Democratic
33rd	1984–1988	Neil Young	New Democratic
Riding dissolved into Beaches—Woodbine and Broadview—Greenwood

== Election results ==
1979 Canadian federal election
Party	Candidate	Votes	%
Progressive Conservative	Robin Richardson	12,840	34.5
New Democratic	Neil Young	12,322	33.1
Liberal	Brian Fullerton	11,232	30.2
Libertarian	David Anderson	388	1.0
Independent	Donald A. Daley	129	0.3
Rhinoceros	Judi Skuce	111	0.3
Marxist–Leninist	Jim McKibbin	91	0.2
Independent	Jim McMillan	69	0.2
Turnout		37,182	100.0
Parliament of Canada:

1980 Canadian federal election
Party	Candidate	Votes	%
New Democratic	Neil Young	12,675	35.6
Liberal	Terry O'Reilly	11,179	31.4
Progressive Conservative	Robin Richardson	11,179	31.4
Libertarian	Dennis Corrigan	272	0.8
Rhinoceros	David Reid	214	0.6
Marxist–Leninist	Jim McKibbin	60	0.2
Independent	Vince Corriero	45	0.1
Turnout		35,624	100.0
Parliament of Canada:

1984 Canadian federal election
Party	Candidate	Votes	%
New Democratic	Neil Young	14,914	40.6
Progressive Conservative	Jack Jones	12,443	33.9
Liberal	Terry Kelly	8,155	22.2
Green	Trevor Hancock	581	1.6
Libertarian	Dennis Corrigan	353	1.0
Independent	Terrence Kennedy	132	0.4
Independent	John Turmel	112	0.3
Commonwealth of Canada	Ron Thorsen	27	0.1
Turnout		36,177	100.0
Parliament of Canada:

== See also ==
- List of Canadian electoral districts
- Historical federal electoral districts of Canada
