= Joy Langan =

Canadian politician (1943–2009)

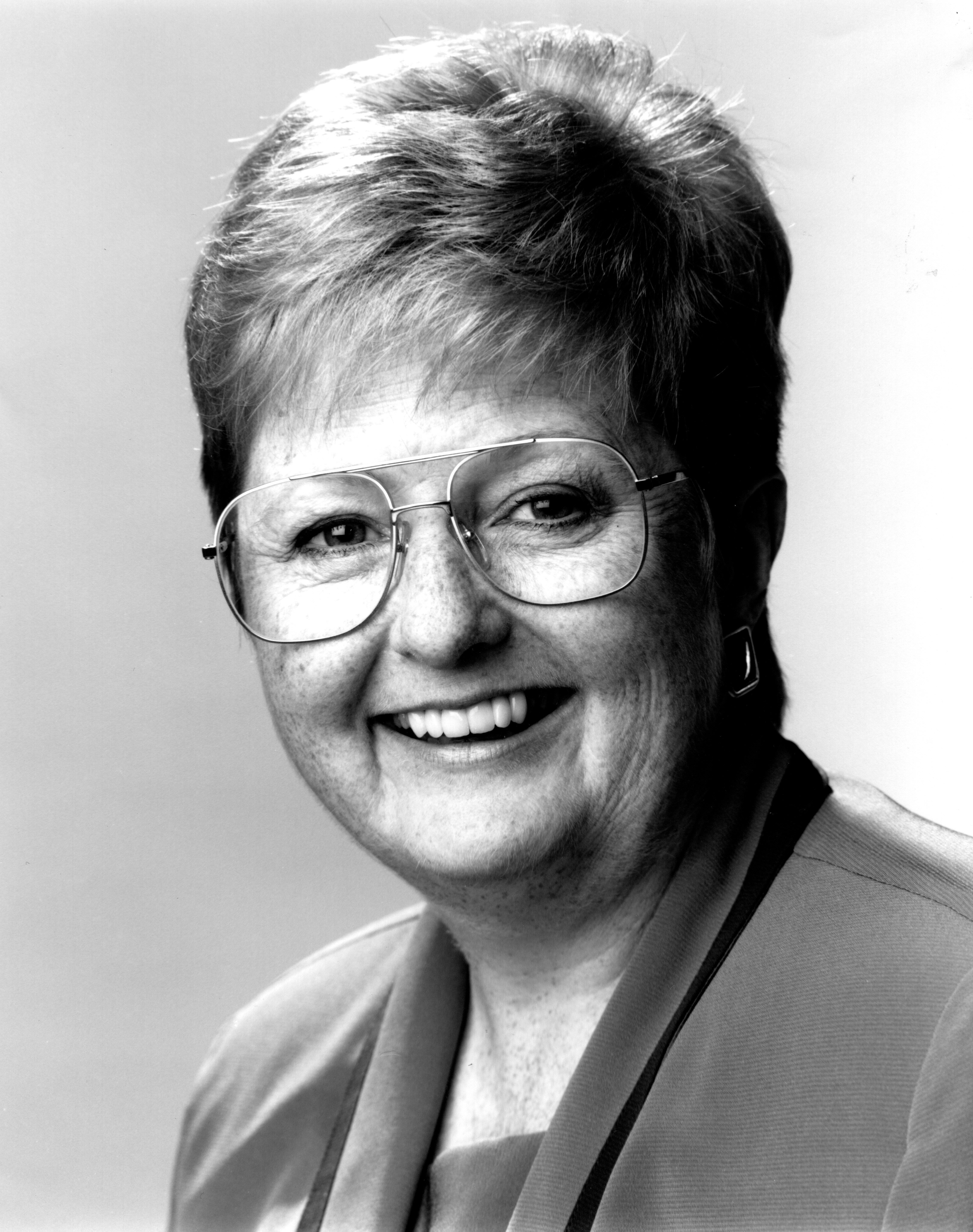

MP for Mission—Coquitlam
- In office 1988–1993
- Preceded by: Seat Created
- Succeeded by: Daphne Jennings

Personal details
- Born: 23 January 1943 Rossland, British Columbia
- Died: 30 July 2009 (aged 66) Port Moody, British Columbia
- Party: New Democratic Party
- Occupation: journalist, printer, activist

Joy Langan (23 January 1943 – 30 July 2009) was a member of the House of Commons of Canada from 1988 to 1993. Her background was in journalism, writing and social activism.

She was elected in the 1988 federal election, representing the Mission—Coquitlam electoral district for the New Democratic Party. She served in the 34th Canadian Parliament but lost to Daphne Jennings of the Reform Party in the 1993 federal election. She also campaigned unsuccessfully in the 1997 federal election in the Port Moody—Coquitlam riding.

== Death ==
Langan died of breast cancer in Port Moody, British Columbia, on 30 July 2009, aged 66.
