= New Democratic Party candidates in the 1980 Canadian federal election =

The New Democratic Party ran a full slate of candidates in the 1980 Canadian federal election, and won 32 seats to remain the third-largest party in the House of Commons of Canada. Information about the party's candidates may be found here.

== Alberta ==
=== Calgary ===
Riding	Candidate's Name	Notes	Residence	Occupation	Votes	%	Rank
Calgary Centre	David Jones				2,994	9.23	3rd
Calgary East	Barry Pashak	NDP candidate for Calgary East in the 1979 federal election ANDP candidate for Calgary-North Hill in the 1971 Alberta provincial election			4,490	10.28	3rd
Calgary North	Dave Hammond				3,180		3rd
Calgary South	Cathie McCreary	NDP candidate for Calgary South in the 1979 federal election			2,812		3rd
Calgary West	Bob Ritchie				3,107	7.68	3rd

=== Edmonton ===
Riding	Candidate's Name	Notes	Residence	Occupation	Votes	%	Rank
Edmonton East	Jo Evans				4,763	17.30	3rd
Edmonton North	John Younie				5,107		3rd
Edmonton South	Gordon Fearn	NDP candidate for Edmonton South in the 1979 federal election			4,772		3rd
Edmonton—Strathcona	Doug Trace				4,837	12.01	3rd
Edmonton West	Jerome N. Slavik				3,886		3rd

=== Rural Alberta ===
Riding	Candidate's Name	Notes	Residence	Occupation	Votes	%	Rank
Athabasca	Harry W. Daniels				4,218	15.07	3rd
Bow River	David Radke				2,802	7.05	3rd
Crowfoot	Roger Milbrandt	NDP candidate for Crowfoot in the 1979 federal election			1,912	6.24	3rd
Lethbridge–Foothills	Dave Porteous				3,974	9.98	3rd
Medicine Hat	Agnes Wiley				3,453	9.37	3rd
Peace River	Earle Joseph Guertin	NDP candidate for Peace River in the 1979 federal election			5,436	17.02	3rd
Pembina	Martin Davis				5,260		3rd
Red Deer	Ethel Taylor				3,345	7.9	3rd
Vegreville	Henry Mandelbaum				3,172		3rd
Wetaskiwin	Lyle B. Bleich				3,673	10.3	3rd
Yellowhead	Laird Mitchell				4,562	11.3	3rd

== British Columbia ==
=== British Columbia Interior ===
Riding	Candidate's Name	Notes	Residence	Occupation	Votes	%	Rank
Cariboo—Chilcotin	Harry Olaussen	NDP candidate for Cariboo—Chilcotin in the 1979 federal election			10,292	33.95	2nd
Kamloops—Shuswap	Nelson Riis	Member of Kamloops City Council (1973–1978)		Professor at Cariboo College	17,896	39.10	1st
Kootenay East—Revelstoke	Sid Parker	Mayor of Revelstoke (1970–1978)		Train conductor	13,299	39.87	1st
Kootenay West	Lyle Kristiansen				12,232	43.04	1st
Okanagan North	John Powell	NDP candidate for Okanagan North in the 1979 federal election			14,944	29.13	2nd
Okanagan—Similkameen	Darwin Sigurgeirson	NDP candidate for Okanagan—Similkameen in the 1979 federal election			19,058	39.24	2nd
Prince George—Bulkley Valley	Archie Patrick	NDP candidate for Prince George—Bulkley Valley in the 1979 federal election			10,226	31.94	2nd
Prince George—Peace River	Bob Simpson	NDP candidate for Prince George—Peace River in the 1979 federal election			6,835	26.20	2nd
Skeena	Jim Fulton	Member of Parliament for Skeena (1979–1993)		Probation officer	13,280	49.52	1st

=== Fraser Valley/Lower Mainland ===
Riding	Candidate's Name	Notes	Residence	Occupation	Votes	%	Rank
Burnaby	Svend Robinson	Member of Parliament for Burnaby (1979–1988)		Lawyer	21,587	42.43	1st
Capilano	Andy J. Krawczyk				6,495	14.64	3rd
Fraser Valley East	Harry W. Fontaine	NDP candidate for Fraser Valley East in the 1979 federal election			10,695	24.18	2nd
Fraser Valley West	Joe Leclair				16,568	32.55	2nd
Mission—Port Moody	Mark Rose	Member of Parliament for Fraser Valley West (1968–1974); Member of Coquitlam City Council (1966–1968)		Professor	23,224	47.19	1st
New Westminster—Coquitlam	Pauline Jewett	Member of Parliament for New Westminster—Coquitlam (1979–1988); Member of Parliament for Northumberland (1963–1965)		President of Simon Fraser University (1974–1978)	19,498	46.42	1st
North Vancouver—Burnaby	Jack Woodward			Lawyer	11,820	26.85	3rd
Richmond—South Delta	Mercia Stickney	NDP candidate for Richmond—South Delta in the 1979 federal election			13,606	24.23	2nd
Surrey—White Rock—North Delta	Carol Langford	NDP candidate for Surrey—White Rock—North Delta in the 1979 federal election			19,051		2nd
Vancouver Centre	Ron Johnson	NDP candidate for Vancouver Centre in the 1979 federal election			14,830	31.77	2nd
Vancouver East	Margaret Anne Mitchell	Member of Parliament for Vancouver East (1979–1993)		Social worker	14,245	43.91	1st
Vancouver Kingsway	Ian Waddell	Member of Parliament for Vancouver Kingsway (1979–1988)		Lawyer	16,928	46.85	1st
Vancouver Quadra	Alan Bush	NDP candidate for Vancouver Quadra in the 1979 federal election			9,907	21.75	3rd
Vancouver South	Judy McManus	NDP candidate for Vancouver South in the 1979 federal election			8,896	21.27	3rd

=== Vancouver Island ===
Riding	Candidate's Name	Notes	Residence	Occupation	Votes	%	Rank
Comox—Powell River	Raymond Skelly	Member of Parliament for Comox—Powell River (1979–1988)		Teacher	25,007	48.97	1st
Cowichan—Malahat—The Islands	Jim Manly	NDP candidate for Cowichan—Malahat—The Islands in the 1979 federal election BC NDP candidate for Prince Rupert in the 1969 British Columbia provincial election			22,154	48.16	1st
Esquimalt—Saanich	Bob Cameron	NDP candidate for Esquimalt—Saanich in the 1979 federal election			19,115	34.48	2nd
Nanaimo—Alberni	Ted Miller	Member of Parliament for Nanaimo—Alberni (1979–1984)		Teacher	24,082	49.20	1st
Victoria	Robin Blencoe				17,088	34.32	2nd

== Manitoba ==
=== Rural Manitoba ===
Riding	Candidate's Name	Notes	Residence	Occupation	Votes	%	Rank
Brandon-Souris	David Serle	NDP candidate for Brandon-Souris in the 1979 federal election			8,509	24.8	3rd
Churchill	Rod Murphy	Member of Parliament for Churchill (1979–1993)		Teacher	10,319	43.3	1st
Dauphin—Swan River	Laverne Lewycky	NDP candidate for Dauphin—Swan River in the 1979 federal election			12,960	44.8	1st
Lisgar	Herman Rempel				3,353		3rd
Portage—Marquette	Maude Lelonde	NDP candidate for Portage—Marquette in the 1979 federal election			7,221		2nd
Provencher	Richard Rattai				9,281	28.4	2nd
Selkirk—Interlake	Terry Sargeant	Member of Parliament for Selkirk—Interlake (1979–1984)		Policy analyst	15,055	45.7	1st

=== Winnipeg ===
Riding	Candidate's Name	Notes	Residence	Occupation	Votes	%	Rank
Saint Boniface	Marc Boily				11,191	25.2	3rd
Winnipeg—Assiniboine	Max Melnyk				7,304		3rd
Winnipeg—Birds Hill	Bill Blaikie	Member of Parliament for Winnipeg—Birds Hill (1979–1988)		United Church minister	24,672	54.27	1st
Winnipeg—Fort Garry	Brad McKenzie				7,293	18.08	3rd
Winnipeg North	David Orlikow	Member of Parliament for Winnipeg—Birds Hill (1962–1988); Member of the Legislative Assembly of Manitoba for St. Johns (1958–1962); Member of Winnipeg City Council (1951–1958)			18,561	50.5	1st
Winnipeg North Centre	Stanley Knowles	Member of Parliament for Winnipeg North Centre (1962–1984 & 1942–1958); Vice President of the Canadian Labour Congress (1958–1962); Member of the Winnipeg City Council (1941–1942)		United Church minister	12,637		1st
Winnipeg—St. James	Cyril Keeper				11,078		1st

== New Brunswick ==
Riding	Candidate's Name	Notes	Residence	Occupation	Votes	%	Rank
Carleton—Charlotte	Arthur Slipp				4,680	15.2	3rd
Fundy—Royal	George Little				8,668	21.06	3rd
Gloucester	Kevin O'Connell	NDP candidate for Gloucester in the 1979 federal election			4,484	12.84	3rd
Madawaska—Victoria	James Aucoin	NDP candidate for Madawaska—Victoria in the 1979 federal election			2,943	11.3	3rd
Moncton	Gregory Murphy	NDP candidate for Moncton in the 1979 federal election			7,791	16.71	3rd
Northumberland—Miramichi	Jerry Dunnett	NDP candidate for Northumberland—Miramichi in the 1979 federal election			4,694	17.38	3rd
Restigouche	Aurele Ferlatte				4,457	16.5	3rd
Saint John	David M. Brown				5,978	18.9	3rd
Westmorland—Kent	René Vannieuwenhuizen	NDP candidate for Westmorland—Kent in the 1979 federal election			5,255	16.31	3rd
York—Sunbury	Phillip Booker	NDP candidate for York—Sunbury in the 1979 federal election			5,567	14.55	3rd

== Newfoundland and Labrador ==
Riding	Candidate's Name	Notes	Residence	Occupation	Votes	%	Rank
Bonavista-Trinity-Conception	Anne Robbins				4,619	16.63	3rd
Burin-St. George's	Peter Fenwick				2,929		3rd
Gander—Twillingate	Clyde West				2,338		3rd
Grand Falls—White Bay—Labrador	Ern Condon				6,582	22.32	3rd
Humber—Port au Port—St. Barbe	Fonse Faour	Member of Parliament for Humber—Port au Port—St. Barbe (1979–1980); Member of Parliament for Humber—St. George's—St. Barbe (1978–1979)		Lawyer	9,535		2nd
St. John's East	George P. Corbett				3,973	12.16	3rd
St. John's West	J. Michael Maher				3,967		3rd

== Nova Scotia ==
Riding	Candidate's Name	Notes	Residence	Occupation	Votes	%	Rank
Annapolis Valley—Hants	Bob Levy	NDP candidate for Annapolis Valley—Hants in the 1979 federal election			10,338	25.29	3rd
Cape Breton—East Richmond	Andrew Hogan	Member of Parliament for Cape Breton—East Richmond (1974–1980)		Roman Catholic priest	12,184		2nd
Cape Breton Highlands—Canso	William J. Woodfine	NDP candidate for Cape Breton Highlands—Canso in the 1979 federal election			4,902		3rd
Cape Breton—The Sydneys	Ed Murphy	NDP candidate for Cape Breton—The Sydneys in the 1979 federal election			10,180		2nd
Central Nova	Gary A. Chambers	NDP candidate for Central Nova in the 1979 federal election			5,743	17.71	3rd
Cumberland—Colchester	Hayden Trenholm	NDP candidate for Cumberland—Colchester in the 1979 federal election			7,111	17.86	3rd
Dartmouth—Halifax East	Nelson Reed				8,764	20.41	3rd
Halifax	Alexa McDonough	NDP candidate for Halifax in the 1979 federal election			8,009	19.67	3rd
Halifax West	Dennis Theman	NDP candidate for Halifax West in the 1979 federal election			10,043	20.91	3rd
South Shore	John Yates	NDP candidate for South Shore in the 1979 federal election			5,856	16.11	3rd
South West Nova	John Lee				4,922	12.80	3rd

== Prince Edward Island ==
Riding	Candidate's Name	Notes	Residence	Occupation	Votes	%	Rank
Cardigan	Aubrey Cantelo				1,054	5.91	3rd
Egmont	Vincent Gallant	NDP candidate for Egmont in the 1979 federal election			824	5.00	3rd
Hillsborough	Bob Crockett	NDP candidate for Hillsborough in the 1979 federal election			1,245	8.32	3rd
Malpeque	Vic Arsenault				1,216	7.19	3rd

== Quebec ==
=== Central Quebec ===
Riding	Candidate's Name	Notes	Residence	Occupation	Votes	%	Rank
Berthier—Maskinongé—Lanaudière	None				–	–	–
Champlain	René Matte	Member of Parliament for Champlain (1968–1979)		Professor	9,164		2nd
Joliette	Jacques Trudeau	NDP candidate for Joliette in the 1979 federal election			2,330	4.91	3rd
Richelieu	Julian Heller				3,004	7.34	3rd
Saint-Maurice	Edgar Paquette				1,963	5.50	4th
Trois-Rivières	Denis Faubert				3,870	11.1	3rd

=== Eastern Townships/Southern Quebec ===
Riding	Candidate's Name	Notes	Residence	Occupation	Votes	%	Rank
Beauce	Luc Pepin				404	0.9	5th
Beauharnois—Salaberry	Michael Wiltshire				2,738	7.3	3rd
Brome—Missisquoi	Gertrude Lefebvre-Brown	NDP candidate for Brome—Missisquoi in the 1979 federal election			1,508	4.00	3rd
Châteauguay	William W. Evans				4,203		2nd
Drummond	André Lefebvre				2,305	6.4	3rd
Frontenac	Jean-Denis Lavigne				1,693		4th
Lotbinière	Jean-Denis Lavigne	NDP candidate for Lotbinière in the 1979 federal election			3,041		4th
Mégantic—Compton—Stanstead	Keith Taylor				1,769		4th
Richmond—Wolfe	André Cardinal				1,477		3rd
Saint-Hyacinthe—Bagot	Diane Lemieux				2,257	5.4	3rd
Saint-Jean	Roger Roy				5,194	12.4	2nd
Shefford	Denis Boissé	NDP candidate for Shefford in the 1979 federal election			3,701	7.81	3rd
Sherbrooke	Yves Dubois				3,777	10.0	2nd
Verchères	Chislaine Gagnon				7,015	12.8	2nd

=== Greater Montreal ===
Riding	Candidate's Name	Notes	Residence	Occupation	Votes	%	Rank
Blainville—Deux-Montagnes	Normand J. Labrie	NDP candidate for Blainville—Deux-Montagnes in the 1979 federal election			5,460		2nd
Bourassa	Roderick Charters				5,144	12.7	2nd
Chambly	Dominique Vaillancourt	NDP candidate for Chambly in the 1979 federal election			5,868	12.48	2nd
Dollard	Pierre Bourgeois	NDP candidate for Dollard in the 1979 federal election			5,767	11.65	2nd
Duvernay	John Shatilla	NDP candidate for Duvernay in the 1979 federal election			5,069	10.62	3rd
Gamelin	Mariette Caron-Denis				4,506		2nd
Hochelaga—Maisonneuve	Marie-Ange Gagnon-Sirois	NDP candidate for Hochelaga—Maisonneuve in the 1979 federal election			2,732		2nd
Lachine	Buff Norman	NDP candidate for Lachine in the 1979 federal election			3,492		3rd
Lasalle	Gaston Coté	NDP candidate for Lasalle in the 1979 federal election					2nd
Laurier	Jean-Pierre Bourdouxhe	NDP candidate for Laurier in the 1979 federal election			2,216		3rd
Laval	Lauraine Vaillancourt	NDP candidate for Laval in the 1979 federal election			5,709		2nd
Laval-des-Rapides	Martin Vaillancourt				4,699		2nd
La Prairie	Jean-Claude Bohrer	NDP candidate for La Prairie in the 1979 federal election			5,894		2nd
Longueuil	Jean-Pierre Vaillancourt	NDP candidate for Longueuil in the 1979 federal election			6,144	12.9	2nd
Montreal–Mercier	Pierre Dubé				4,258		2nd
Sainte-Marie	Jean-Pierre Juneau	NDP candidate for Sainte-Marie in the 1979 federal election			2,443	8.73	3rd
Mount Royal	David C. Winch	NDP candidate for Mount Royal in the 1979 federal election			2,356	5.66	3rd
Notre-Dame-de-Grâce	Grendon Haines				4,482	11.55	3rd
Outremont	Claire A. Brisson	NDP candidate for Outremont in the 1979 federal election			3,996	12.42	2nd
Papineau	Jean-Marc Dompierre				2,796	9.32	2nd
Rosemont	Marcel Julien	NDP candidate for Rosemont in the 1979 federal election			3,337	9.5	2nd
Saint-Henri—Westmount	Claude de Mestral	NDP candidate for Saint-Henri—Westmount in the 1979 federal election			3,766		3rd
Saint-Michel—Ahuntsic	Frank Reiss				3,422		2nd
Saint-Léonard—Anjou	Filippo Salvatore	NDP candidate for Saint-Michel—Ahuntsic in the 1979 federal election			3,741		2nd
Terrebonne	Gilles Bertrand				6,917	13.1	2nd
Vaudreuil	Lorne Brown	NDP candidate for Vaudreuil in the 1979 federal election			7,309		2nd

=== Northern Quebec ===
Riding	Candidate's Name	Notes	Residence	Occupation	Votes	%	Rank
Abitibi	Royal Tremblay				2,553	5.9	3rd
Charlevoix	Normand Laforce	NDP candidate for Charlevoix in the 1979 federal election			1,273		3rd
Chicoutimi	Marc St-Hilaire	NDP candidate for Chicoutimi in the 1979 federal election			2,926	9.5	3rd
Jonquière	Jacques Hubert	NDP candidate for Jonquière in the 1979 federal election			4,444		2nd
Lac-Saint-Jean	Jean-Denis Bérubé	NDP candidate for Lac-Saint-Jean in the 1979 federal election			3,465		3rd
Manicouagan	Roger Muller				2,111	6.7	3rd
Roberval	Carol André Simard				569	1.7	3rd
Témiscamingue	Marc Lord				1,586	4.39	4th

=== Quebec City/Gaspe/Eastern Quebec ===
Riding	Candidate's Name	Notes	Residence	Occupation	Votes	%	Rank
Bellechasse	Napoléon Goupil				730	1.81	5th
Bonaventure—Îles-de-la-Madeleine	John Foran				1,568		3rd
Charlesbourg	Etienne Tremblay				7,388		2nd
Gaspé	Yvon Pipon				1,018		3rd
Kamouraska—Rivière-du-Loup	None				–	–	–
Langelier	Edith Frankel				2,811	8.1	3rd
Lévis	Daniel Vachon				6,459		2nd
Louis-Hébert	Robert Caron				7,392	13.98	2nd
Matapédia—Matane	Thérèse Beaulieu				888	3.3	5th
Montmorency—Orléans	Marcel Tremblay				3,049	7.53	3rd
Portneuf	Robert Ferland				3,285	8.3	2nd
Québec-Est	Maurice Vaney				3,327		2nd
Rimouski	René Mcdonald				1,155		4th

=== Western Quebec/Laurentides/Outaouais ===
Riding	Candidate's Name	Notes	Residence	Occupation	Votes	%	Rank
Argenteuil	Ida Brown				2,422	7.56	3rd
Gatineau	Renée Pierre Brisson				4,792	10.63	2nd
Hull	Michel Légère	NDP candidate for Hull in the 1979 federal election		Lawyer	10,059	24.53	2nd
Labelle	Willie Kofman	NDP candidate for Labelle in the 1979 federal election			2,858		3rd
Pontiac—Gatineau—Labelle	Jean-Pierre Paillet				2,813	9.16	3rd

== Ontario ==
=== Central Ontario ===
Riding	Candidate's Name	Notes	Residence	Occupation	Votes	%	Rank
Durham—Northumberland	Fred McLaughlin	NDP candidate for Durham—Northumberland in the 1979 federal election			9,453	24.23	3rd
Grey—Simcoe	Joan Stone				6,236		3rd
Northumberland	Hugh Jenney	NDP candidate for Northumberland in the 1979 federal election			5,108		3rd
Peterborough	Paul Rexe				10,776	22.3	3rd
Simcoe North	Fayne Bullen	NDP candidate for Simcoe North in the 1979 federal election			11,139	27.3	3rd
Simcoe South	Paul Wessenger			Lawyer	9,474		3rd
Victoria–Haliburton	Patrick Daniel	NDP candidate for Victoria–Haliburton in the 1979 federal election			8,884	21.2	3rd

=== Eastern Ontario/Ottawa ===
Riding	Candidate's Name	Notes	Residence	Occupation	Votes	%	Rank
Glengarry—Prescott—Russell	Claude Dion				4,781	11.6	3rd
Hastings—Frontenac	Kevin Arseneault	NDP candidate for Hastings—Frontenac in the 1979 federal election			5,895		3rd
Kingston and the Islands	Stephen Foster	NDP candidate for Kingston and the Islands in the 1979 federal election			7,830	18.0	3rd
Lanark—Renfrew—Carleton	Gord Gilhuly	NDP candidate for Lanark—Renfrew—Carleton in the 1979 federal election			4,948		3rd
Leeds—Grenville	Mildred Smith	NDP candidate for Leeds—Grenville in the 1979 federal election			6,600	17.07	3rd
Nepean—Carleton	Alan White				7,187	12.2	3rd
Ottawa—Carleton	Don Francis				7,788		3rd
Ottawa Centre	John Smart	NDP candidate for Ottawa Centre in the 1979 federal election			7,529	15.96	3rd
Ottawa—Vanier	Jim Stark				5,721	13.80	3rd
Ottawa West	Abby Pollonetsky	NDP candidate for Ottawa West in the 1979 federal election			5,955		3rd
Prince Edward—Hastings	Donald Wilson	NDP candidate for Prince Edward—Hastings in the 1979 federal election			6,889	18.7	3rd
Renfrew—Nipissing—Pembroke	Don Breault	NDP candidate for Renfrew—Nipissing—Pembroke in the 1979 federal election			6,200	15.6	3rd

=== Greater Toronto Area ===
Riding	Candidate's Name	Notes	Residence	Occupation	Votes	%	Rank
Beaches	Neil Young	NDP candidate for Beaches in the 1979 federal election Candidate for Ward 9 (The Beaches) in the 1976 Toronto municipal election		Machinist	12,675	35.6	1st
Brampton—Georgetown	David Moulton	NDP candidate for Brampton—Georgetown in the 1979 federal election			11,978		3rd
Broadview–Greenwood	Bob Rae	Member of Parliament for Broadview–Greenwood(1978–1982)			12,953	40.37	1st
Burlington	Danny Dunleavy	NDP candidate for Burlington in the 1979 federal election			8,421	15.7	2nd
Davenport	Ed Brown	NDP candidate for Davenport in the 1979 federal election			5,170	22.2	2nd
Don Valley East	Saul Paton	NDP candidate for Don Valley East in the 1979 federal election			5,713	11.6	3rd
Don Valley West	Jonathan Lomas				4,702	9.6	3rd
Eglinton—Lawrence	Graham Murray				6,077	14.70	3rd
Etobicoke Centre	Dan Shipley	NDP candidate for Etobicoke Centre in the 1979 federal election			6,181	10.8	3rd
Etobicoke—Lakeshore	Terry Meagher	NDP candidate for Etobicoke—Lakeshore in the 1979 federal election			12,405	28.3	3rd
Etobicoke North	Adrian Dorn	NDP candidate for Etobicoke North in the 1979 federal election			10,237	20.0	3rd
Halton	Doug Black	NDP candidate for Halton in the 1979 federal election			8,455	16.0	3rd
Mississauga North	W. George Ross				11,729		3rd
Mississauga South	Neil Davis				8,711	16.8	3rd
Ontario	Geoff Rison	NDP candidate for Ontario in the 1979 federal election			12,812		3rd
Oshawa	Ed Broadbent	Leader of the New Democratic Party (1975–1989); Member of Parliament for Oshawa (1968–1990)			26,761	51.6	1st
Parkdale—High Park	Doug Little	NDP candidate for Parkdale—High Park in the 1979 federal election			8,094	21.4	3rd
Rosedale	Jim Hockley				5,698	14.85	3rd
St. Paul's	James Lockyer			Lawyer	5,301	13.40	3rd
Scarborough Centre	Michael Prue			Civil servant	9,237	22.4	3rd
Scarborough East	Chris Bain				8,533		3rd
Scarborough West	John Paul Harney	Member of Parliament for Scarborough West (1972–1974)		Professor at York University	13,146	32.2	2nd
Spadina	John Foster	NDP candidate for Spadina in the 1979 federal election			8,232		2nd
Trinity	Manuel Azevedo	NDP candidate for Trinity in the 1979 federal election			5,005		2nd
Willowdale	Bob Hebdon				6,889	14.7	3rd
York Centre	Cris Liscio				7,696	20.3	2nd
York East	Kay MacPherson	NDP candidate for York East in the 1979 and 1974 federal elections			7,997		3rd
York North	Bruce Searle	NDP candidate for York North in the 1979 federal election			8,933		3rd
York—Peel	John Hall				8,708		3rd
York—Scarborough	Vinc Overend				10,939		3rd
York South—Weston	Vince Del Buono	NDP candidate for York Centre in the 1979 federal election			9,280	26.5	2nd
York West	Elio Costa	NDP candidate for York West in the 1979 federal election			8,884	23.6	3rd

=== Hamilton/Niagara ===
Riding	Candidate's Name	Notes	Residence	Occupation	Votes	%	Rank
Erie	Clarence Gibson	NDP candidate for Erie in the 1979 federal election			6,848		3rd
Hamilton East	Don Gray	Member of Hamilton City Council (1972–1985)			12,627		2nd
Hamilton Mountain	Ian Deans	Member of Provincial Parliament for Wentworth (1967–1979)		Firefighter	17,700	35.5	1st
Hamilton–Wentworth	David Hitchcock	NDP candidate for Hamilton–Wentworth in the 1979 federal election			9,392	22.33	3rd
Hamilton West	Miriam Simpson	NDP candidate for Hamilton West in the 1979 federal election			9,330		3rd
Lincoln	Kenneth I. Lee	NDP candidate for Lincoln in the 1979 federal election			13,500		3rd
Niagara Falls	John A. Dawson	NDP candidate for Niagara Falls in the 1979 federal election			8,167	21.2	2nd
St. Catharines	Peter Elliott	NDP candidate for St. Catharines in the 1979 federal election			13,006	26.5	3rd
Welland	Robert Wright	NDP candidate for Welland in the 1979 federal election			11,729	28.4	2nd

=== Northern Ontario ===
Riding	Candidate's Name	Notes	Residence	Occupation	Votes	%	Rank
Algoma	Jim Dinner	NDP candidate for Algoma in the 1979 federal election			11,262	32.65	2nd
Cochrane North	Robert Fortin	NDP candidate for Cochrane North in the 1979 federal election			10,814		2nd
Kenora—Rainy River	John Edmund Parry	Mayor of Sioux Lookout (1978–1984); Member of Sioux Lookout Town Council (1977–1978)	Sioux Lookout	Business consultant	14,322		2nd
Nickel Belt	John Rodriguez	Member of Parliament for Nickel Belt (1972–1980); Member of Coniston Town Council (1971–1972); President of the Ontario English Catholic Teachers' Association (1968–1969)		Teacher	17,529	42.06	2nd
Nipissing	Art Peltomaa				4,515		3rd
Parry Sound—Muskoka	Dennis Hay	NDP candidate for Parry Sound—Muskoka in the 1979 federal election			7,603	22.3	3rd
Sault Ste. Marie	Cyril Symes	Member of Parliament for Sault Ste. Marie (1972–1980)		Teacher	12,542	38.94	2nd
Thunder Bay—Atikokan	Iain Angus	Member of Provincial Parliament for Fort William (1975–1977)			13,150	39.0	2nd
Thunder Bay—Nipigon	Bruce McKay	NDP candidate for Thunder Bay—Nipigon in the 1979 federal election			12,950	36.4	2nd
Timiskaming	Arnold Peters	Member of Parliament for Timiskaming (1957–1980)		Miner	10,661		2nd
Timmins—Chapleau	Bill Ferrier	Member of Provincial Parliament for Cochrane South (1967–1977)		United Church minister	10,745		2nd

=== Southwestern Ontario ===
Riding	Candidate's Name	Notes	Residence	Occupation	Votes	%	Rank
Brant	Derek Blackburn	Member of Parliament for Brant (1971–1993)		Teacher	19,194	41.1	1st
Bruce—Grey	Malcolm A. Kennett				4,391	11.3	3rd
Cambridge	Mike Farnan				11,346	31.2	2nd
Elgin	Gary Johnson				12,410		2nd
Essex—Kent	David Wurfel				5,083		3rd
Essex—Windsor	Steven W. Langdon	NDP candidate for Essex—Windsor in the 1979 federal election			19,123	39.8	2nd
Guelph	Jim Finamore	NDP candidate for Guelph in the 1979 federal election			9,765	22.17	3rd
Haldimand—Norfolk	Norm Walpole				6,937	15.7	3rd
Huron—Bruce	Tony McQuail		Lucknow	Farmer	3,864	11.1	3rd
Kent	George McDermott				5,758		3rd
Kitchener	James Herman	NDP candidate for Kitchener in the 1979 federal election			11,494		3rd
Lambton—Middlesex	Grant Reynolds	NDP candidate for Lambton—Middlesex in the 1979 federal election			4,617		3rd
London East	Rob Martin	NDP candidate for London East in the 1979 federal election			8,055	21.7	3rd
London—Middlesex	Bill Lloyd	NDP candidate for London—Middlesex in the 1979 federal election			8,672		3rd
London West	Paddy Musson	NDP candidate for London West in the 1979 federal election			8,817	14.4	3rd
Oxford	Marjorie Lanaway	NDP candidate for Oxford in the 1979 federal election			6,885	16.3	3rd
Perth	John Davies	NDP candidate for Perth in the 1979 federal election			4,635		3rd
Sarnia—Lambton	Wally Krawczyk	NDP candidate for Sarnia—Lambton in the 1979 federal election			9,809	24.4	3rd
Waterloo	Bob Needham				9,819	19.06	3rd
Wellington—Dufferin—Simcoe	Cecil Chambers				5,966		3rd
Windsor—Walkerville	John Moynahan				14,460		2nd
Windsor West	Maxine Jones	NDP candidate for Windsor West in the 1979 federal election			9,785	28.98	2nd

== Saskatchewan ==
Riding	Candidate's Name	Notes	Residence	Occupation	Votes	%	Rank
Assiniboia	Randy MacKenzie				9,710		3rd
Humboldt—Lake Centre	Vic Althouse	NDP candidate for Humboldt—Lake Centre in the 1979 federal election		Farmer	13,243		1st
Kindersley—Lloydminster	Wayne G. Nargang				9,589		2nd
Mackenzie	Lars Elroy Bracken				10,435		2nd
Moose Jaw	David H. Henley	NDP candidate for Moose Jaw in the 1979 federal election			10,641		2nd
Prince Albert	Stan Hovdebo	Member of Parliament for Prince Albert (1979–1988)		Teacher	11,601	34.8	1st
Qu'Appelle—Moose Mountain	Mel W.R. McCorriston				7,872		2nd
Regina East	Simon De Jong	Member of Parliament for Regina East (1979–1988)		Artist/Restaurant owner	13,630		1st
Regina West	Les Benjamin	Member of Parliament for Regina West (1979–1988); Member of Parliament for Regina—Lake Centre (1968–1979)			17,353		1st
Saskatoon East	Bob Ogle	Member of Parliament for Saskatoon East (1979–1984)		Roman Catholic priest	12,985		1st
Saskatoon West	Reg Parker	NDP candidate for Saskatoon West in the 1979 federal election			14,852		2nd
Swift Current—Maple Creek	Ron Gates	NDP candidate for Swift Current—Maple Creek in the 1979 federal election			8,338		2nd
The Battlefords—Meadow Lake	Doug Anguish			Consultant	9,819		1st
Yorkton—Melville	Lorne Nystrom	Member of Parliament for Yorkton—Melville (1968–1993)		Consultant/Teacher	15,240	45.7	1st

== The Territories ==
Riding	Candidate's Name	Notes	Residence	Occupation	Votes	%	Rank
Nunatsiaq	Peter Ittinuar	Member of Parliament for Nunatsiaq (1979–1984)			2,688	47.27	1st
Western Arctic	Wally Firth	Member of Parliament for Western Arctic (1972–1979)			3,537	33.63	2nd
Yukon	Jim McCullough				1,918	19.84	3rd
