= Marie Thérèse Killens =

Canadian politician

Member of Parliament for Saint-Michel
- In office 1979–1988
- Preceded by: Monique Bégin
- Succeeded by: district abolished

Personal details
- Born: 29 June 1927 (age 98) Trois-Rivières, Quebec
- Party: Liberal Party of Canada
- Profession: administrator

Marie Thérèse Rollande Killens (born 29 June 1927) is a former Canadian politician who served as a Liberal member of the House of Commons of Canada. She is an administrator by career.

She represented the riding of Saint-Michel, which became known as Saint Michel—Ahuntsic in 1983. Her victories in the 1979, 1980 and 1984 federal elections, earned her terms in the 31st, 32nd and 33rd Canadian Parliaments.

She did not campaign in the 1988 federal election and left federal politics at the completion of her third term in office.

== Electoral record ==
Source – Canadian elections database

1979 Canadian federal election: Saint-Michel
Party	Candidate	Votes
Liberal	Marie Thérèse Killens	29,046
Social Credit	John Mitchell	4,299
New Democratic	Filippo Salvatore	2,616
Progressive Conservative	Jean-Louis Pozza	2,602
Rhinoceros	François Gourd	1,453
Union populaire	Bernard L. Longpré	432
Communist	Vittoria Bronzati	177
Marxist–Leninist	Serge Tremblay	147

1980 Canadian federal election: Saint-Michel
Party	Candidate	Votes
Liberal	Marie Thérèse Killens	27,210
New Democratic	Frank Reiss	3,422
Progressive Conservative	Jean-Louis Pozza	2,059
Rhinoceros	Benoit Yodepèch Chaput	1,603
Social Credit	Charles E. Landry	1,079
Union populaire	Bernard L. Longpré	279
Not affiliated	Luigi D'Alonzo	189
Communist	Vitoria Bronzati	116
Marxist–Leninist	Serge Tremblay	93

1984 Canadian federal election: Saint-Michel—Ahuntsic
Party	Candidate	Votes	%
Liberal	Thérèse Killens	17,269	42.48
Progressive Conservative	René Paradis	15,444	37.99
New Democratic	Hélène Mongeau	4,875	11.99
Rhinoceros	Le Sénateur Luc Dumont	1,543	3.80
Parti nationaliste	Louis de Kinder	1,243	3.06
Communist	Line Chabot	190	0.47
Commonwealth of Canada	Joseph A. El-Sayed	88	0.22
Total valid votes		40,652	100.00
Total rejected ballots		684	
Turnout		41,336	74.34
Electors on the lists		55,607	
Source: Report of the Chief Electoral Officer, Thirty-third General Election, 1984.
