= Monique Bégin =

Canadian academic and politician (1936–2023)

The Honourable Monique Bégin PC CC FRSC

Minister of Health and Welfare
- In office March 3, 1980 – September 16, 1984
- Prime Minister: Pierre Trudeau; John Turner
- Preceded by: David Crombie
- Succeeded by: Jake Epp
- In office September 16, 1977 – June 3, 1979
- Prime Minister: Pierre Trudeau
- Preceded by: Marc Lalonde
- Succeeded by: David Crombie

Minister of National Revenue
- In office September 14, 1976 – September 15, 1977
- Prime Minister: Pierre Trudeau
- Preceded by: Bud Cullen
- Succeeded by: Joseph-Philippe Guay

Member of Parliament for Saint-Michel
- In office October 30, 1972 – May 22, 1979
- Preceded by: Victor Forget
- Succeeded by: Thérèse Killens

Member of Parliament for Saint-Léonard—Anjou
- In office May 22, 1979 – July 9, 1984
- Preceded by: first member
- Succeeded by: Alfonso Gagliano

Personal details
- Born: March 1, 1936 Rome, Italy
- Died: September 8, 2023 (aged 87) Ottawa, Ontario, Canada
- Party: Liberal
- Occupation: Administrator sociologist
- Website: Parliament of Canada biography

Monique Bégin PC CC FRSC (March 1, 1936 – September 8, 2023) was a Canadian academic and politician.

== Early life ==
Bégin was born in Rome to a Canadian-born sound engineer Joseph Lucien Bégin (1895–1964) and Belgian-born accountant Marie-Louise Vanhavre (1906–1967) and raised in France and Portugal before emigrating to Canada at the end of World War II. She received an MA degree in sociology from the Université de Montréal and a PhD degree from the Sorbonne. She described her early life in Montreal as challenging, but credited community groups and her childhood role as a Girl Guides of Canada member as "sav(ing) her life".

== Political career ==
In 1967, Bégin became executive secretary of the Royal Commission on the Status of Women, which published its report in 1970. She won election to the House of Commons of Canada as a Liberal candidate in the riding of Saint-Michel in Montreal in the 1972 election. Bégin, Albanie Morin and Jeanne Sauvé, all elected in 1972, were the first women ever elected to the House of Commons from Quebec.

Bégin was appointed to the Canadian Cabinet by Prime Minister Pierre Trudeau as Minister of National Revenue from 1976 to 1977, and served as Minister of Health and Welfare from 1977 to 1979 and again from 1980 to 1984 during which she introduced the Canada Health Act in Parliament which was passed unanimously in 1984 by the House of Commons and is still in force today. She declined to run again in the 1984 election and retired from politics.

== Post-politics ==
In 1986, she joined the University of Ottawa and Carleton University as the first joint Ottawa-Carleton Chair of Women's Studies. From 1990 to 1997, she was the University of Ottawa's dean of the Faculty of Health Sciences and continued teaching as a professor emeritus. From 1993 to 1995, she also served as co-chair of Ontario's Royal Commission on Learning with Gerald Caplan.

In 1997, she was made an Officer of the Order of Canada. Bégin served as the Treasurer for the International Centre for Migration and Health.

In 2015, she was a recipient of the Governor General's Award in Commemoration of the Persons Case.

In 2018, she published the memoir Ladies, Upstairs!: My Life in Politics and After.

Bégin was elevated to a Companion of the Order of Canada in 2020.

== Death ==
Monique Bégin died in Ottawa on September 8, 2023, at the age of 87.

== Electoral record ==
1980 Canadian federal election: Saint-Léonard—Anjou
Party	Candidate	Votes	%
Liberal	Monique Bégin	42,228	81.12
New Democratic	Filippo Salvatore	3,741	7.19
Progressive Conservative	Pierre Gauthier	2,972	5.71
Rhinoceros	Pierre Guzzo-Céros	1,569	3.01
Social Credit	Gaétan Bernard	1,194	2.29
Union populaire	U.P. Nelson Bouchard	260	0.50
Marxist–Leninist	Caroline Commandeur-Laloux	91	0.17
Total valid votes		52,055	100.00
Total rejected ballots		607	
Turnout		52,662	66.44
Electors on the lists		79,266	
Source: Report of the Chief Electoral Officer, Thirty-second General Election, 1980.
lop.parl.ca

1979 Canadian federal election: Saint-Leonard-Anjou
Party	Candidate	Votes
Liberal	Monique Bégin	45,582
Social Credit	Réal Ménard	5,102
Progressive Conservative	Luciano Coraggio	3,556
New Democratic	Colette Lalancette-Deschamps	3,105
Rhinoceros	Joanne Noël	1,291
Union populaire	Alice Derome	268
Marxist–Leninist	Carole Commandeur-Laloux	176

1974 Canadian federal election: Saint-Michel
Party	Candidate	Votes
Liberal	Monique Bégin	29,822
Progressive Conservative	Pierre Noël	6,816
Social Credit	Charles-Eugène Landry	4,348
New Democratic	J. Richard Sylvestre	3,833
Marxist–Leninist	Anna C. Campagna	476
Communist	Gloria Mallaroni	277

1972 Canadian federal election: Saint-Michel
Party	Candidate	Votes
Liberal	Monique Bégin	23,850
Social Credit	Charles-Eugène Landry	8,591
Progressive Conservative	J.-Maurice Bergeron	7,158
Independent	Robert G. Beale	4,758
New Democratic	Hélène Lewis	4,551

== Archives ==
There is a Monique Bégin fonds at Library and Archives Canada.
