= Parti nationaliste du Québec candidates in the 1984 Canadian federal election =

The Parti nationaliste du Québec fielded 74 candidates in the province of the Quebec in the 1984 Canadian federal election, none of whom were elected. Some of the party's candidates have their own biography pages; information about others may be found here.

== Candidates ==
=== Richelieu: Guy Vachon ===
Guy Vachon received 1,463 votes (3.01%), finishing fourth against Progressive Conservative candidate Louis Plamondon. He later ran as a candidate of the Parti Québécois in the 1989 provincial election.

=== Saint-Léonard—Anjou: Pierre-Alain Cotnoir ===
Pierre-Alain Cotnoir is an ethnologist and polling analyst. He received 1,634 votes (2.76%) in 1984, finishing fifth against Liberal candidate Alfonso Gagliano. In 1995, Cotnoir and three other academics sought to persuade Quebec premier Jacques Parizeau not to hold a referendum on Quebec sovereignty, using polling data to show that the pro-sovereignty side did not have sufficient support. Their efforts were unsuccessful, and Parizeau called the referendum; the sovereignty option was narrowly defeated.
