= Liberal Party of Canada candidates in the 1980 Canadian federal election =

The Liberal Party of Canada fielded a full slate of 282 candidates in the 1980 federal election and won 147 seats to form a majority government under Pierre Trudeau's leadership.

Many of the party's candidates have their own biography pages. Information about some of the others may be found here. This page also includes information on Liberal candidates who contested federal by-elections in Canada between 1980 and 1984.

== Manitoba ==
=== Winnipeg—Birds Hill: Ronald Wally ===
Ronald (Ron) Wally was a Liberal candidate in the 1979 and 1980 Canadian federal elections, at which time he was a civil servant in private life. He later became the executive director of the Manitoba Association of Health Care Professionals, representing unionized technologists. In 1994, he accused the provincial government of privileging doctors over other health professionals in its plans for health care reform. He was the principal negotiator for workers at CancerCare Manitoba in 2000 and helped prevent an illegal strike from taking place.

Electoral record
Election	Division	Party	Votes	%	Place	Winner
1979 federal	Winnipeg—Birds Hill	Liberal	5,674	11.16	3/5	Bill Blaikie, New Democratic Party
1980 federal	Winnipeg—Birds Hill	Liberal	7,020	15.44	3/5	Bill Blaikie, New Democratic Party

== By-elections ==
=== Timiskaming, 12 October 1982: Pierre Bélanger ===
Pierre Bélanger is an entrepreneur and activist in Northern Ontario. He was a co-founder of the Coopérative des artistes du Nouvel-Ontario, which supports Franco-Ontarian artists, in the early 1970s. He also founded one of the first bison ranches in Ontario and has operated a recreational vehicle business. From 1983 to 2002, he owned the Earlton Zoo.

Bélanger ran for the Liberal Party in the 1979 general election and a 1982 by-election. On the latter occasion, he indicated that he did not agree with the Trudeau government's decision to combat inflation with high interest rates. He subsequently led a high-profile campaign against the City of Toronto government's plan to transport its garbage to the abandoned Adams Mine near Kirkland Lake in the District of Timiskaming in 2000.

Electoral record
Election	Division	Party	Votes	%	Place	Winner
1979 federal	Timiskaming	Liberal	10,900	38.20	2/3	Arnold Peters, New Democratic Party
Canadian federal by-election, 12 October 1982	Timiskaming	Liberal	8,341	33.02	2/4	John MacDougall, Progressive Conservative
