= Results breakdown of the 1979 Canadian federal election =

1979 Canadian federal election

== Results by Province and Territory ==
=== Alberta ===
Results in Alberta
Party	Seats	Second	Third	Fourth	Fifth	Sixth	Seventh	Votes	%	+/-
Progressive Conservative	21							559,588	66.47	
Liberals		19	1					180,452	21.43	
NDP			19	1				81,466	9.68	
Independent		1		1	1			9,601	1.14	
Social Credit				7	1			7,519	0.89	
No affiliation to a recognised party				2				1,649	0.2	
Communist				3	3	1		969	0.12	
Marxist–Leninist				1	3	1	1	500	0.06	
Libertarian					1			174	0.02	
Total	21							841,918	100.0	

=== British Columbia ===
Results in British Columbia
Party	Seats	Second	Third	Fourth	Fifth	Sixth	Seventh	Votes	%	+/-
Progressive Conservative	19	6	3					530,380	44.35	
NDP	8	13	7					381,678	31.92	
Liberals	1	9	18					274,946	22.99	
Independent				3	1	1		2,306	0.19	
Social Credit				3				1,885	0.16	
Communist				8	4			1,853	0.15	
No affiliation to a recognised party				4		1		1,533	0.13	
Marxist–Leninist				2	7	2	1	736	0.06	
Rhinoceros				1				332	0.03	
Libertarian				2				263	0.02	
Total	28							1,195,912	100.0	

=== Manitoba ===
Results in Manitoba
Party	Seats	Second	Third	Fourth	Fifth	Sixth	Votes	%	+/-
Progressive Conservative	7	6	1				222,787	43.36	
NDP	5	5	4				167,850	32.67	
Liberals	2	3	9				120,493	23.45	
Social Credit				4			1,044	0.2	
Marxist–Leninist				2	5		651	0.13	
Communist				3			486	0.09	
Independent					1		319	0.06	
No affiliation to a recognised party					1	1	143	0.03	
Total	14						513,773	100.0	

=== New Brunswick ===
Results in New Brunswick
Party	Seats	Second	Third	Fourth	Votes	%	+/-
Liberals	6	4			150,634	44.63	
Progressive Conservative	4	6			134,998	40	
NDP			10		51,642	15.3	
Independent				1	258	0.08	
Total	10				337,532	100.0	

=== Newfoundland and Labrador ===
Results in Newfoundland and Labrador
Party	Seats	Second	Third	Votes	%	+/-
Liberals	4	3		81,861	41.72	
NDP	1	3	3	59,978	30.57	
Progressive Conservative	2	1	4	54,376	27.71	
Total	7			196,215	100.0	

=== Northwest Territories ===
Results in Northwest Territories
Party	Seats	Second	Third	Fourth	Votes	%	+/-
Liberals		2			5,714	34.12	
Progressive Conservative	1		1		5,410	32.31	
NDP	1		1		5,348	31.94	
Independent				1	273	1.63	
Total	2				16,745	100.0	

=== Nova Scotia ===
Results in Nova Scotia
Party	Seats	Second	Third	Fourth	Fifth	Sixth	Votes	%	+/-
Progressive Conservative	8	2	1				193,099	45.37	
Liberals	2	9					151,078	35.5	
NDP	1		10				79,603	18.7	
Independent				4			1,458	0.34	
Marxist–Leninist				1		1	155	0.04	
No affiliation to a recognised party					1		152	0.04	
Communist					1		64	0.02	
Total	11						425,609	100.0	

=== Ontario ===
Results in Ontario
Party	Seats	Second	Third	Fourth	Fifth	Sixth	Seventh	Eighth	Ninth	Tenth	Votes	%	+/-
Progressive Conservative	57	20	18								1,732,764	41.82	
Liberals	32	57	6								1,509,926	36.44	
NDP	6	18	71								873,394	21.08	
Libertarian				45	2						13,377	0.32	
Marxist–Leninist				9	25	20	7		1		4,521	0.11	
Independent				7	10	2	1	2		1	3,992	0.1	
Communist				7	14	4	3				3,246	0.08	
Social Credit				3	2						1,002	0.02	
No affiliation to a recognised party				1		3	1				634	0.02	
Rhinoceros					2	1					378	0.01	
Total	95										4,143,234	100.0	

=== Prince Edward Island ===
Results in Prince Edward Island
Party	Seats	Second	Third	Fourth	Votes	%	+/-
Progressive Conservative	4				34,147	52.85	
Liberals		4			26,231	40.6	
NDP			4		4,181	6.47	
Libertarian				1	54	0.08	
Total	4				64,613	100.0	

=== Quebec ===
Results in Quebec
Party	Seats	Second	Third	Fourth	Fifth	Sixth	Seventh	Eighth	Ninth	Tenth	Votes	%	+/-
Liberals	67	8									1,975,526	61.66	
Social Credit	6	37	20	10	1						512,995	16.01	
Progressive Conservative	2	27	38	8							432,199	13.49	
NDP		2	14	48	10	1					163,489	5.1	
Rhinoceros			1	6	47	5					61,891	1.93	
Union Populaire					14	34	16	3	1	1	19,514	0.61	
No affiliation to a recognised party		1	1	1		1				1	17,333	0.54	
Independent			1	1		4	1	1			9,289	0.29	
Marxist–Leninist					2	10	20	14	5		7,419	0.23	
Communist						3	6	6	4		2,458	0.08	
Libertarian						7	1				1,984	0.06	
Total	75										3,204,097	100.0	

=== Saskatchewan ===
Results in Saskatchewan
Party	Seats	Second	Third	Fourth	Fifth	Sixth	Votes	%	+/-
Progressive Conservative	10	4					201,803	41.23	
NDP	4	10					175,011	35.76	
Liberals			14				106,550	21.77	
Independent				3			3,212	0.66	
Social Credit				7	1		2,514	0.51	
Marxist–Leninist					2	2	249	0.05	
Communist					1		65	0.01	
Total	14						489,404	100.0	

=== Yukon ===
Results in Yukon
Party	Seats	Second	Third	Votes	%	+/-
Progressive Conservative	1			4,538	40.59	
Liberals		1		4,065	36.36	
NDP			1	2,578	23.06	
Total	1			11,181	100.0	
