= International Centre for Migration and Health =

International Centre for Migration, Health and Development
- Formation: 1995
- Executive director: Manuel Carballo

The International Centre for Migration, Health and Development (ICMHD) is a Swiss-based non-profit organization based in Geneva, Switzerland. It is a research, training and policy centre founded in 1995 with the purpose of improving, protecting and advocating for the health and welfare of people on the move. ICMHD is a WHO Collaborating Centre for Health-Related Issues Among People Displaced by Disasters and a UNFPA Implementing Partner. It also works with other UN agencies as well as with universities and research and training institutions throughout the world.

ICMHD's mandate is to provide governments, UN agencies, NGOs and other parties with information and technical support on how the movement of people affects, and is affected by health and social conditions, and how this dynamic can be best managed to the benefit of everyone concerned.

The work of ICMHD is predicated on the fact that the right to health must apply to all people, including migrants, refugees and others who find themselves on the move for political, environmental, social and economic reasons. ICMHD believes that in protecting the health and welfare of people on the move, the public health and security of the larger society is also strengthened.

The work of ICMHD covers all types of population movement, including economically motivated migration (documented and undocumented), forced migration (environmental and political), nomadic migration, and the movement of uniformed service groups such as peacekeepers and military personnel. From the perspective of health, health care and health systems, ICMHD addresses non-communicable, communicable and parasitic diseases. ICMHD is currently working on research, training and policy options in the areas of HIV/AIDS, tuberculosis, viral hepatitis, diabetes, malaria, reproductive health, and psycho-social impacts of uprooting. It is also addressing the question of healthcare worker migration and alternative approaches to preventing excess brain drain from developing countries.

The executive committee is composed of Eamon Kelly (president), Mohamed-Lardi Abdelmoumene (vice-president), Monique Bégin (treasurer), and Manuel Carballo (executive director).

== Office locations ==
- Geneva, Switzerland
- Nairobi, Kenya
- Rome, Italy
- Sarajevo, Bosnia
