= Saint-Léonard—Saint-Michel =

Federal electoral district in Quebec, Canada

Coordinates: 45.589°N 73.589°W

Quebec electoral district
- Interactive map of riding boundaries from the 2025 federal election

Federal electoral district
- Legislature: House of Commons
MP
Patricia Lattanzio
Liberal
- District created: 1987
- First contested: 1988
- Last contested: 2021
- District webpage: profile, map

Demographics
- Population (2021): 115,553
- Electors (2021): 74,279
- Area (km²): 21
- Pop. density (per km²): 5,502.5
- Census division: Montreal
- Census subdivision: Montreal (part)

Saint-Léonard—Saint-Michel (French pronunciation: [sɛ̃leɔnaʁ sɛ̃miʃɛl]; known until 1996 as Saint-Léonard) is a federal electoral district within the City of Montreal in Quebec, Canada, which has been represented in the House of Commons since 1988. Its population during the 2011 election was 108,811.

Since 2019, its Member of Parliament (MP) has been Patricia Lattanzio of the Liberal Party, the first woman to represent the district.

== Geography ==
The district is located in the north eastern part of the Island of Montreal. The district includes the entire borough of Saint-Leonard, and the neighbourhood of Saint-Michel which is a part of the borough of Villeray–Saint-Michel–Parc-Extension and a small part of the borough of Rosemont–La Petite-Patrie lying northwesterly of Bélanger Street.

== Demographics ==
According to the 2021 Canadian census

- Languages (2021 mother tongue): 33.4% French, 17.0% Italian, 12.0% Arabic, 8.6% Spanish, 6.8% English, 6.2% Creole, 2.8% Vietnamese, 1.6% Kabyle, 1.4% Portuguese, 1.1% Khmer, 0.9% Cantonese, 0.9% Tamil, 0.8% Turkish, 0.5% Romanian, 0.5% Bengali, 0.4% Min Nan, 0.4% Mandarin, 0.3% Greek, 0.3% Polish, 0.3% Ukrainian

== History ==
"Saint-Léonard" riding was first created in 1976 from parts of Maisonneuve—Rosemont, Mercier and Saint-Michel ridings. The name of the riding was changed in 1977 to Saint-Léonard—Anjou before an election was held. It consisted of the City of Saint-Léonard, the Town of Anjou, and part of the City of Montreal.

The neighbouring ridings are Rosemont—La Petite-Patrie, Papineau, Ahuntsic, Bourassa, Honoré-Mercier, and Hochelaga.

The current electoral district was created as "Saint-Léonard" riding in 1987 from parts of Gamelin and Saint-Léonard—Anjou ridings. In 1996, its name was changed to "Saint-Léonard—Saint-Michel" when its boundaries changed and now included part of the neighbourhood of Saint-Michel.

This riding lost some territory to Papineau, and gained territory from Ahuntsic and Hochelaga during the 2012 electoral redistribution.

During the 2022 Canadian federal electoral redistribution Saint-Léonard—Saint-Michel lost territory north of Boul. Langelier and west of Rue Bombardier to Honoré-Mercier; This left part of the borough of Saint-Léonard in that riding. The boundary with Hochelaga along Rue Bélanger moved to the borough boundary between Rosemont—La-Petite-Patrie and Saint-Léonard.

=== Members of Parliament ===
This riding has elected the following members of Parliament:

Parliament	Years	Member	Party
Saint-Léonard; Riding created from Gamelin and Saint-Léonard—Anjou
34th	1988–1993	Alfonso Gagliano	Liberal
35th	1993–1997	Alfonso Gagliano	Liberal
Saint-Léonard—Saint-Michel
36th	1997–2000	Alfonso Gagliano	Liberal
37th	2000–2002	Alfonso Gagliano	Liberal
37th	2002–2004	Massimo Pacetti	Liberal
38th	2004–2006	Massimo Pacetti	Liberal
39th	2006–2008	Massimo Pacetti	Liberal
40th	2008–2011	Massimo Pacetti	Liberal
41st	2011–2014	Massimo Pacetti	Liberal
41st	2014–2015	Massimo Pacetti	Independent
42nd	2015–2019	Nicola Di Iorio	Liberal
43rd	2019–2021	Patricia Lattanzio	Liberal
44th	2021–2025	Patricia Lattanzio	Liberal
45th	2025–present	Patricia Lattanzio	Liberal

== Election results ==
=== Saint-Léonard—Saint-Michel, 1996–present ===
2025 Canadian federal election
Party	Candidate	Votes	%	±%	Expenditures
Liberal	Patricia Lattanzio	26,833	65.34	−4.26	
Conservative	Panagiota Koroneos	8,457	20.59	+10.13	
Bloc Québécois	Laurie Lelacheur	2,938	7.15	−0.83	
New Democratic	Marwan El Attar	2,450	5.97	−2.23	
People's	Caroline Mailloux	388	0.94	−2.82	
Total valid votes/expense limit		41,066	97.73		
Total rejected ballots		955	2.27		
Turnout		42,021	58.23		
Eligible voters		72,160			
Liberal notional hold		Swing		−7.20	
Source: Elections Canada
Note: number of eligible voters does not include voting day registrations.

2021 federal election redistributed results
Party	Vote	%
Liberal	28,374	69.60
Conservative	4,266	10.46
New Democratic	3,342	8.20
Bloc Québécois	3,254	7.98
People's	1,531	3.76

2021 Canadian federal election
Party	Candidate	Votes	%	±%	Expenditures
Liberal	Patricia Lattanzio	29,010	69.40	+8.07	$55,649.86
Conservative	Louis Ialenti	4,381	10.50	-1.44	$0.00
New Democratic	Alicia Di Tullio	3,460	8.30	+1.78	$1,225.49
Bloc Québécois	Laurence Massey	3,395	8.10	-1.48	$2,242.01
People's	Daniele Ritacca	1,568	3.70	+2.60	$386.31
Total valid votes/expense limit		41,814	100.0		$108,432.19
Total rejected ballots		890	N/A		
Turnout		42,704	56.45	-3.93	
Eligible voters		74,279			
Liberal hold		Swing		+4.76	
Source: Elections Canada

2019 Canadian federal election
Party	Candidate	Votes	%	±%	Expenditures
Liberal	Patricia Lattanzio	27,866	61.33	-3.40	$39,698.45
Conservative	Ilario Maiolo	5,423	11.94	+0.81	$50,901.27
Bloc Québécois	Dominique Mougin	4,351	9.58	+2.39	none listed
Independent	Hassan Guillet	3,061	6.74	–	none listed
New Democratic	Paulina Ayala	2,964	6.52	-8.33	$1,299.32
Green	Alessandra Szilagyi	1,183	2.60	0.79	$512.28
People's	Tina Di Serio	501	1.10	–	$1,392.50
Marxist–Leninist	Garnet Colly	85	0.19	-0.10	$0.00
Total valid votes		45,434	100.0		
Total rejected ballots		993	2.19		
Turnout		46,427	60.38	+1.16	
Eligible voters		76,885			
Liberal hold		Swing		-2.11	
Source: Elections Canada

2015 Canadian federal election
Party	Candidate	Votes	%	±%	Expenditures
Liberal	Nicola Di Iorio	28,835	64.73	+22.56	$153,190.81
New Democratic	Rosannie Filato	6,611	14.85	-17.15	$22,492.22
Conservative	Jean Philippe Fournier	4,957	11.13	-2.50	$3,960.19
Bloc Québécois	Steeve Gendron	3,204	7.19	-2.46	$3,404.74
Green	Melissa Miscione	805	1.81	+0.04	$19.00
Marxist–Leninist	Arezki Malek	128	0.29	-0.19	–
Total valid votes/expense limit		44,531	100.0		$209,748.64
Total rejected ballots		689	1.52		
Turnout		45,220	59.22	+7.71	
Eligible voters		76,531			
Liberal notional hold		Swing		+19.86	
Source: Elections Canada

2011 federal election redistributed results
Party	Vote	%
Liberal	15,702	42.17
New Democratic	12,026	32.30
Conservative	5,075	13.63
Bloc Québécois	3,592	9.65
Green	660	1.77
Others	179	0.48

2011 Canadian federal election
Party	Candidate	Votes	%	±%	Expenditures
Liberal	Massimo Pacetti	15,340	42.30	-14.95	
New Democratic	Roberta Peressini	11,720	32.32	+21.64	
Conservative	Riccardo De Ioris	4,991	13.76	-1.12	
Bloc Québécois	Alain Bernier	3,396	9.36	-4.24	
Green	Michael Di Pardo	657	1.81	-1.00	
Marxist–Leninist	Garnet Colly	162	0.45	+0.02	
Total valid votes/expense limit		36,266	100.00		
Total rejected ballots		674	1.75	+0.18	
Turnout		36,940	51.51	-2.08	
Eligible voters		71,717	–	–	
Liberal hold		Swing		-18.30	

2008 Canadian federal election
Party	Candidate	Votes	%	±%	Expenditures
Liberal	Massimo Pacetti	21,652	57.25	-0.08	$58,674
Conservative	Lucie Le Tourneau	5,627	14.88	+0.47	$28,585
Bloc Québécois	Farid Salem	5,146	13.60	-5.14	$8,509
New Democratic	Laura Colella	4,039	10.68	+3.86	$2,036
Green	Frank Monteleone	1,063	2.81	+0.50	
Marxist–Leninist	Garnet Colly	165	0.43	-0.09	
Independent	Joseph Young	122	0.32	–	$743
Total valid votes/expense limit		37,814	100.00	$81,851	
Total rejected ballots		604	1.57	+0.05	
Turnout		38,418	53.59		
Liberal hold		Swing	-0.3		

2006 Canadian federal election
Party	Candidate	Votes	%	±%	Expenditures
Liberal	Massimo Pacetti	23,705	57.17	−6.73	$66,670
Bloc Québécois	Justine Charlemagne	7,772	18.74	−3.11	$20,789
Conservative	Ercolano Pingiotti	5,975	14.41	+9.13	$15,672
New Democratic	Laura Colella	2,831	6.83	+0.85	$4,702
Green	Pierre-Louis Parant	961	2.32	−0.01	none listed
Marxist–Leninist	Stéphane Chénier	219	0.53	−0.13	none listed
Total valid votes		41,463	100.00		
Total rejected ballots		640			
Turnout		42,103	57.00	+2.48	
Electors on the lists		73,869			
Sources: Official Results, Elections Canada and Financial Returns, Elections Canada.

2004 Canadian federal election
Party	Candidate	Votes	%	±%	Expenditures
Liberal	Massimo Pacetti	25,884	63.90	−12.76	$63,440
Bloc Québécois	Paul-Alexis François	8,852	21.85	+7.40	$9,289
New Democratic	Laura Colella	2,422	5.98		$6,007
Conservative	Payam Eslami	2,138	5.28	−0.11	$5,647
Green	Ricardo Fellicetti	944	2.33		none listed
Marxist–Leninist	Stéphane Chénier	267	0.66		none listed
Total valid votes		40,507	100.00		
Total rejected ballots		855			
Turnout		41,362	54.52		
Electors on the lists		75,864			
Note: Conservative vote is compared to the Progressive Conservative vote in 2000 election.
Sources: Official Results, Elections Canada and Financial Returns, Elections Canada. Percentage change totals are in relation to the 2000 general election.

Canadian federal by-election, 13 May 2002 Retirement of Alfonso Gagliano
Party	Candidate	Votes	%	±%
Liberal	Massimo Pacetti	14,076	83.5	+6.9
Bloc Québécois	Umberto Di Genova	1,495	8.9	-5.6
Progressive Conservative	Antonio Cordeiro	634	3.8	+1.5
New Democratic	Normand Caplette	447	2.7	+1.5
Marijuana	Marc-Boris St-Maurice	197	1.2	-0.2
Total valid votes		16,849	100.0	

2000 Canadian federal election
Party	Candidate	Votes	%	±%
Liberal	Alfonso Gagliano	35,396	76.7	+6.9
Bloc Québécois	Marcel Ferlatte	6,679	14.5	-1.9
Alliance	Daniel Champagne	1,750	3.8	
Progressive Conservative	Mostafa Ben Kirane	1,057	2.3	-9.3
Marijuana	Karina Néron	635	1.4	
New Democratic	Sara Mayo	528	1.1	-1.2
Marxist–Leninist	Yves Le Seigle	127	0.3	
Total valid votes		46,172	100.0	

1997 Canadian federal election
Party	Candidate	Votes	%	±%
Liberal	Alfonso Gagliano	36,088	69.8	+8.6
Bloc Québécois	Umberto Di Genova	8,457	16.3	-11.0
Progressive Conservative	Ronald Gosselin	5,990	11.6	+3.0
New Democratic	Pierre J.C. Allard	1,198	2.3	+1.1
Total valid votes		51,733	100.0	

=== Saint-Léonard, 1988–1996 ===
1993 Canadian federal election
Party	Candidate	Votes	%	±%
Liberal	Alfonso Gagliano	28,799	61.2	+10.9
Bloc Québécois	Umberto Di Genova	12,879	27.4	
Progressive Conservative	Tony Tomassi	4,021	8.5	-28.7
New Democratic	David D'Andrea	583	1.2	-8.9
Natural Law	Marlène Charland	497	1.1	
Marxist–Leninist	Claude Brunelle	141	0.3	
Abolitionist	Mauro Fusco	91	0.2	
Commonwealth of Canada	Sylvain Deschênes	77	0.2	
Total valid votes		47,088	100.0	

1988 Canadian federal election
Party	Candidate	Votes	%
Liberal	Alfonso Gagliano	23,014	50.3
Progressive Conservative	Marc Beaudoin	17,055	37.2
New Democratic	Michel Roche	4,663	10.2
Green	Rolf Bramann	833	1.8
Independent	Bernard Papillon	231	0.5
Total valid votes		45,796	100.0

== See also ==
- List of Canadian electoral districts
- Historical federal electoral districts of Canada
