= Nicola Di Iorio =

Canadian politician

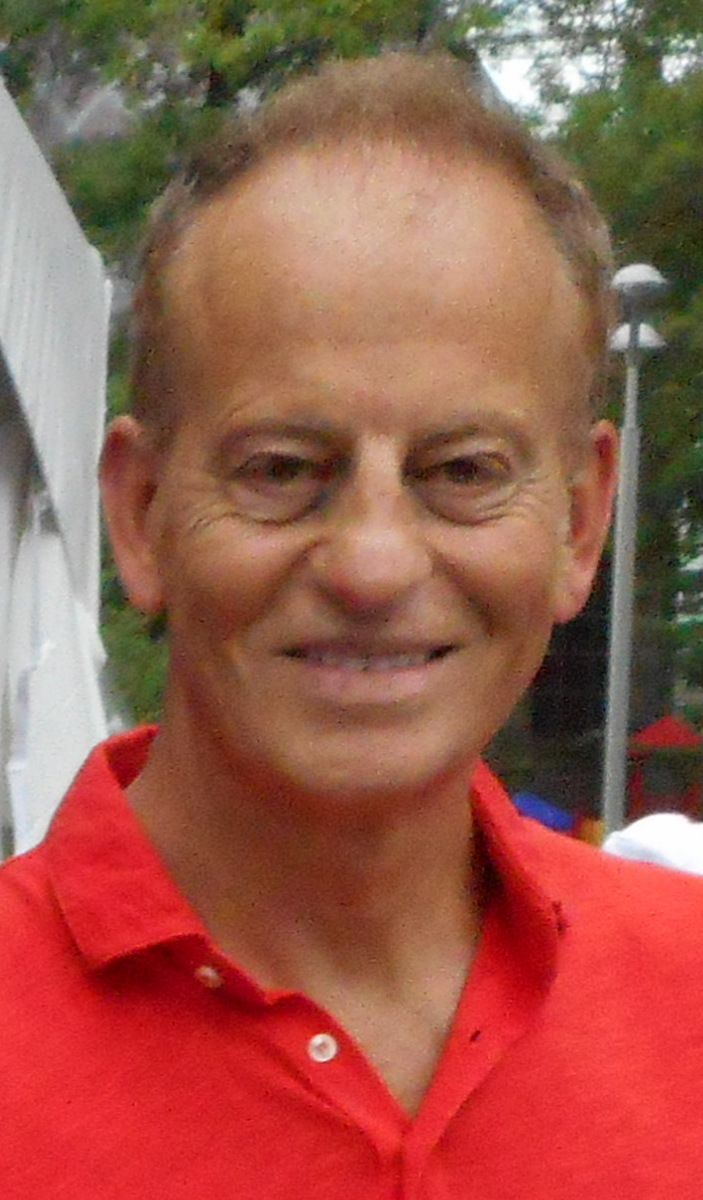
- Di Iorio in 2016

Member of Parliament for Saint-Léonard—Saint-Michel
- In office October 19, 2015 – January 29, 2019
- Preceded by: Massimo Pacetti
- Succeeded by: Patricia Lattanzio

Personal details
- Born: March 13, 1958 (age 68)
- Party: Liberal
- Education: Université de Sherbrooke; Columbia University
- Profession: Lawyer

Nicola Di Iorio (born March 13, 1958) is a Canadian politician and lawyer. A member of the Liberal Party of Canada, he sat as the Member of Parliament for the riding of Saint-Léonard—Saint-Michel from his victory in the 2015 federal election until his resignation in January 2019.

== Early life and career ==
Di Iorio graduated from the Université de Sherbrooke in 1981 with a Bachelor of Laws. He also attended Columbia University, and practised law for 32 years in Montreal, specializing in labour and employment law. He worked for now defunct law firm Heenan Blaikie.

In 2010, his daughter was involved in an accident when a car she was in, which was driven by a drunk driver, hit a tree in his hometown of Mount Royal. She was rendered comatose for a month. As a result of this, Di Iorio became involved in a program to develop "Cool Taxi" coupons to assist people in getting a safe ride home. His involvement in the campaign brought him attention in the Quebec media, and led to his being nominated for Person of the Year by the local chamber of commerce.

== Federal politics ==
In 2015, Di Iorio announced his candidacy for the Liberal Party of Canada's nomination for the 2015 federal election in the riding of Saint-Léonard—Saint-Michel. The previous incumbent, Massimo Pacetti, had been kicked out of the party as a result of a sexual harassment allegation, and Di Iorio earned the strong backing of the riding's Italian community. There was some controversy surrounding the nomination battle, as one of his opponents, Domenic Cusmano, alleged that Di Iorio was distributing memberships in contravention of the rules. Di Iorio nevertheless secured the nomination and won the subsequent general election.

=== Inappropriate comments ===
During an in camera session of the Public Safety Committee meeting on March 8, 2017, Dianne Watts received a call on her cellphone, which emitted a "jaunty" ringtone. In response, Di Iorio remarked "Where's your pole to slide down on?" According to Watts, after the meeting, Di Iorio personally apologized to her about his comments, saying that he saw what he had meant as a joke had made her uncomfortable. Watts then dropped the matter, but Liberal MP Rob Oliphant, the chair of the committee, confirmed that information about the event had been passed on to Liberal whip Pablo Rodríguez. When this incident was reported on by the National Post on March 23, 2017, opposition MPs called for Di Iorio to be disciplined for his comment. He subsequently apologized to the House of Commons for his comments.

=== Resignation ===
Di Iorio announced on April 25, 2018, that he intended to resign his seat by summer for family reasons. He claimed that he had accomplished the goals he had set out for himself when he entered politics in 2015 such as securing funding to extend Montreal's Blue rapid transit line.

However, according to CBC News, Di Iorio had expected to handpick the Liberal candidate who would run in the riding for the 2019 Canadian federal election and leave his office by summer 2018. Once the party insisted that an open nomination would be held, he allegedly changed his mind about his resignation. He gave an interview to a weekly newspaper saying that he would stay on for the rest of his mandate. However, in late September, Di Iorio made a Facebook post saying that he was committed to his community and would take a month of reflection to decide on his future. In late October, shortly after the Cannabis Act came into effect, he presented at a Montreal cannabis trade show, but solely as part of his second job as a labour and employment lawyer. Following criticism for his absence from parliament, he announced in November that he would be resigning from parliament, effective January 22, 2019. Di Iorio announced he would give back his salary received as an MP from September 22, 2018, to January 22, 2019.

On January 22, 2019, Di Iorio donated $100,000 to support anti-drunk driving efforts, fulfilling an earlier promise to donate his salary since the start of his final parliamentary term. He missed his self-imposed resignation deadline, but submitted his official resignation on January 29 to the Speaker of the House of Commons.

== Electoral record ==
2015 Canadian federal election: Saint-Léonard—Saint-Michel
Party	Candidate	Votes	%	±%	Expenditures
Liberal	Nicola Di Iorio	28,826	64.7	+22.53	–
New Democratic	Rosannie Filato	6,611	14.8	-17.20	–
Conservative	Jean Philippe Fournier	4,957	11.1	-2.53	–
Bloc Québécois	Steeve Gendron	3,204	7.2	-2.45	–
Green	Melissa Miscione	805	1.8	+0.03	–
Marxist–Leninist	Arezki Malek	128	0.3	-0.18	–
Total valid votes/expense limit		44,531	100.0		$209,628.68
Total rejected ballots		689	–	–	
Turnout		45,220	59.22	+7.71	
Eligible voters		76,351			
Source: Elections Canada
