= Manuel Carballo =

Manuel Carballo may refer to:

- Manuel Carballo (gymnast) (born 1982), Spanish artistic gymnast
- Manuel Carballo (epidemiologist), epidemiologist
- Manuel Carballo (athlete) (born 1948), Spanish sprinter
- Manuel Carballo (director), Spanish film director, see Exorcismus
- Manuel Carballo (1929–2014), Mexican writer mostly known as Emmanuel Carballo
