= Victor Forget =

Canadian politician

Member of Parliament for Saint-Michel
- In office June 25, 1968 – September 29, 1972
- Preceded by: none
- Succeeded by: Monique Bégin

Personal details
- Born: October 6, 1916 Quebec, Canada
- Died: March 9, 1986 (aged 69) Montreal, Quebec, Canada
- Party: Liberal
- Profession: medical representative

Victor Forget (October 6, 1916 – March 9, 1986) was a Liberal party member of the House of Commons of Canada. He was a medical representative by career.

He was elected at the Saint-Michel riding in the 1968 general election and served only one term in the 28th Canadian Parliament. Forget left federal office and did not participate in any further elections.
