= Saint-Michel (electoral district) =

Former federal electoral district in Quebec, Canada

Quebec electoral district

Defunct federal electoral district
- Legislature: House of Commons
- District created: 1966
- District abolished: 1987
- First contested: 1968
- Last contested: 1984

Saint-Michel (also known as Saint-Michel—Ahuntsic) was a federal electoral district in Quebec, Canada, that was represented in the House of Commons of Canada from 1968 to 1988.

This riding was created in 1966 from portions of Mercier and Papineau ridings. From 1966 to 1979 it encompassed the neighbourhood of Saint-Michel and the then independent city of Saint-Leonard. In 1979 its boundaries changed and now included the neighbourhood Ahuntsic while Saint-Leonard was redistributed into Saint-Leonard-Anjou. In 1983, it was renamed "Saint-Michel—Ahuntsic". It was abolished in 1987 when it was redistributed into Ahuntsic and Papineau—Saint-Michel ridings.

== Members of Parliament ==
This riding elected the following members of Parliament:

Parliament	Years	Member	Party
Saint-Michel; Riding created from Mercier and Papineau
28th	1968–1972	Victor Forget	Liberal
29th	1972–1974	Monique Bégin	Liberal
30th	1974–1979	Monique Bégin	Liberal
31st	1979–1980	Marie Thérèse Killens	Liberal
32nd	1980–1984	Marie Thérèse Killens	Liberal
Saint-Michel—Ahuntsic
33rd	1984–1988	Marie Thérèse Killens	Liberal
Riding dissolved into Ahuntsic and Papineau—Saint-Michel

== Election results ==
=== Saint-Michel, 1968–1984 ===
1968 Canadian federal election
Party	Candidate	Votes
Liberal	Victor Forget	22,307
Progressive Conservative	Louis Balena	4,685
New Democratic	Robert Culmer	3,176
Ralliement créditiste	Edgar Paquin	2,515
Démocratisation Économique	Sylvio-Robert St-Jean	711

1972 Canadian federal election
Party	Candidate	Votes
Liberal	Monique Bégin	23,850
Social Credit	Charles-Eugène Landry	8,591
Progressive Conservative	J.-Maurice Bergeron	7,158
Independent	Robert G. Beale	4,758
New Democratic	Hélène Lewis	4,551

1974 Canadian federal election
Party	Candidate	Votes
Liberal	Monique Bégin	29,822
Progressive Conservative	Pierre Noël	6,816
Social Credit	Charles-Eugène Landry	4,348
New Democratic	J. Richard Sylvestre	3,833
Marxist–Leninist	Anna C. Campagna	476
Communist	Gloria Mallaroni	277

1979 Canadian federal election
Party	Candidate	Votes
Liberal	Marie Thérèse Killens	29,046
Social Credit	John Mitchell	4,299
New Democratic	Filippo Salvatore	2,616
Progressive Conservative	Jean-Louis Pozza	2,602
Rhinoceros	François Gourd	1,453
Union populaire	Bernard L. Longpré	432
Communist	Vittoria Bronzati	177
Marxist–Leninist	Serge Tremblay	147

1980 Canadian federal election
Party	Candidate	Votes
Liberal	Marie Thérèse Killens	27,210
New Democratic	Frank Reiss	3,422
Progressive Conservative	Jean-Louis Pozza	2,059
Rhinoceros	Benoit Yodepèch Chaput	1,603
Social Credit	Charles E. Landry	1,079
Union populaire	Bernard L. Longpré	279
Not affiliated	Luigi D'Alonzo	189
Communist	Vitoria Bronzati	116
Marxist–Leninist	Serge Tremblay	93

=== Saint-Michel—Ahuntsic, 1984–1988 ===
1984 Canadian federal election
Party	Candidate	Votes
Liberal	Marie Thérèse Killens	17,269
Progressive Conservative	René Paradis	15,444
New Democratic	Hélène Mongeau	4,875
Rhinoceros	Le Sénateur Luc Dumont	1,543
Parti nationaliste	Louis De Kinder	1,243
Communist	Line Chabot	190
Commonwealth of Canada	Joseph A. El-Sayed	88

== See also ==
- List of Canadian electoral districts
- Historical federal electoral districts of Canada
