= Independent candidates in the 1980 Canadian federal election =

There were several independent candidates in the 1980 Canadian federal election, none of whom were elected.

== Ontario ==
=== Milorad Novich (Broadview—Greenwood) ===
Novich was a civil engineering technician. He said that he wanted to end "the government's financial support of international communism", and promoted Canadian unity and better housing. He was 42 years old in 1979.

Electoral record
Election	Division	Party	Votes	%	Place	Winner
1979 federal	Broadview—Greenwood	Independent	64	0.19	6/7	Bob Rae, New Democratic Party
1980 federal	Broadview—Greenwood	Independent	40	0.12	9/9	Bob Rae, New Democratic Party
