= Massimo Pacetti =

Canadian politician from Quebec, Canada

Member of Parliament for Saint-Léonard—Saint-Michel
- In office May 13, 2002 – August 4, 2015
- Preceded by: Alfonso Gagliano
- Succeeded by: Nicola Di Iorio

Personal details
- Born: August 22, 1962 (age 64) Montreal, Quebec, Canada
- Party: Independent (2014–2015)
- Other political affiliations: Liberal (2002–2014)
- Profession: accountant

Massimo Pacetti (born August 22, 1962) is a Canadian politician from Quebec, Canada. Pacetti was first elected to the House of Commons of Canada in a 2002 by-election and continued as the Member of Parliament for Saint-Léonard—Saint-Michel sitting with the Liberal caucus until 2014; he served his last year of office as an independent MP.

== Life and career ==
Born in Montreal, Quebec, Pacetti is a former accountant and entrepreneur, and former commissioner of the Pointe-de-l'Île school board.

Pacetti ran as the Liberal candidate in a by-election in 2002 for a seat in the Canadian House of Commons and was elected in the riding of Saint-Léonard—Saint-Michel. He was re-elected in the 2004, 2006, 2008 and 2011 general elections.

In May 2009, he introduced bill C-302, an "Act to recognize the injustice that was done to persons of Italian origin through their "enemy alien" designation and internment during the Second World War, and to provide for restitution and promote education on Italian-Canadian history [worth $2.5 million]" which was passed by the House of Commons on April 28, 2010. Canada Post was also to issue a commemorative postage stamp commemorating the internment of Italian-Canadian citizens, however, Bill C-302 did not pass through the necessary stages to become law.

Pacetti is the Vice–Chair of the Standing Committee on Finance (FINA) and the FINA Subcommittee on Agenda and Procedure.

Pacetti opposed Parliament studying the definition of a human being, saying "In reality, this is just a back door to reopen the debate over abortion in Canada, and a debate that has been closed for many years."

On November 5, 2014, Pacetti and fellow MP Scott Andrews were both suspended from the Liberal Party caucus by leader Justin Trudeau, following allegations of harassment laid by two unnamed New Democratic Party MPs (in 2018 it was revealed that one of the MP was Christine Moore). Both Andrews and Pacetti sat for the remainder of the parliament as independent MPs pending investigation of the complaints. Pacetti announced on March 18, 2015 that he would not be running in the October 2015 federal election, however he continued to maintain that he is innocent of sexual misconduct. It had been reported that Trudeau had intended to meet Pacetti and Andrews later that day to inform them that they were being permanently expelled from the Liberal caucus and would not be allowed to run as Liberals in the next election.

== Electoral record ==
2011 Canadian federal election
Party	Candidate	Votes	%	±%	Expenditures
Liberal	Massimo Pacetti	15,340	42.30	-14.95	
New Democratic	Roberta Peressini	11,720	32.32	+21.64	
Conservative	Riccardo De Ioris	4,991	13.76	-1.12	
Bloc Québécois	Alain Bernier	3,396	9.36	-4.24	
Green	Michael Di Pardo	657	1.81	-1.00	
Marxist–Leninist	Garnet Colly	162	0.45	+0.02	
Total valid votes/Expense limit		36,266	100.00		
Total rejected ballots		674	1.75	+0.18	
Turnout		36,940	51.51	-2.08	
Eligible voters		71,717	–	–	

2008 Canadian federal election
Party	Candidate	Votes	%	±%	Expenditures
Liberal	Massimo Pacetti	21,652	57.25	-0.08	$58,674
Conservative	Lucie Le Tourneau	5,627	14.88	+0.47	$28,585
Bloc Québécois	Farid Salem	5,146	13.60	-5.14	$8,509
New Democratic	Laura Colella	4,039	10.68	+3.86	$2,036
Green	Frank Monteleone	1,063	2.81	+0.50	
Marxist–Leninist	Garnet Colly	165	0.43	-0.09	
Independent	Joseph Young	122	0.32	–	$743
Total valid votes/Expense limit		37,814	100.00	$81,851	
Total rejected ballots		604	1.57	+0.05	
Turnout		38,418	53.59		
Liberal hold		Swing	-0.3		

2006 Canadian federal election: Saint-Léonard—Saint-Michel
Party	Candidate	Votes	%	±%	Expenditures
Liberal	Massimo Pacetti	23,705	57.17	−6.73	$66,670
Bloc Québécois	Justine Charlemagne	7,772	18.74	−3.11	$20,789
Conservative	Ercolano Pingiotti	5,975	14.41	+9.13	$15,672
New Democratic	Laura Colella	2,831	6.83	+0.85	$4,702
Green	Pierre-Louis Parant	961	2.32	−0.01	none listed
Marxist–Leninist	Stéphane Chénier	219	0.53	−0.13	none listed
Total valid votes		41,463	100.00		
Total rejected ballots		640			
Turnout		42,103	57.00	+2.48	
Electors on the lists		73,869			
Sources: Official Results, Elections Canada and Financial Returns, Elections Canada.

2004 Canadian federal election: Saint-Léonard—Saint-Michel
Party	Candidate	Votes	%	±%	Expenditures
Liberal	Massimo Pacetti	25,884	63.90	−12.76	$63,440
Bloc Québécois	Paul-Alexis François	8,852	21.85	+7.40	$9,289
New Democratic	Laura Colella	2,422	5.98		$6,007
Conservative	Payam Eslami	2,138	5.28	−0.11	$5,647
Green	Ricardo Fellicetti	944	2.33		none listed
Marxist–Leninist	Stéphane Chénier	267	0.66		none listed
Total valid votes		40,507	100.00		
Total rejected ballots		855			
Turnout		41,362	54.52		
Electors on the lists		75,864			
Note: Conservative vote is compared to the Progressive Conservative vote in 2000 election.
Sources: Official Results, Elections Canada and Financial Returns, Elections Canada. Percentage change totals are in relation to the 2000 general election.

Canadian federal by-election, 13 May 2002 Retirement of Alfonso Gagliano
Party	Candidate	Votes	%	±%
Liberal	Massimo Pacetti	14,076	83.5	+6.9
Bloc Québécois	Umberto Di Genova	1,495	8.9	-5.6
Progressive Conservative	Antonio Cordeiro	634	3.8	+1.5
New Democratic	Normand Caplette	447	2.7	+1.5
Marijuana	Marc-Boris St-Maurice	197	1.2	-0.2
Total valid votes		16,849	100.0	
