= Patricia Lattanzio =

Canadian politician and lawyer

Patricia Lattanzio MP

Parliamentary Secretary to the Minister of Justice and Attorney General of Canada
- Incumbent
- Assumed office June 5, 2025
- Minister: Sean Fraser
- Preceded by: James Maloney

Chair of the National Security and Intelligence Committee of Parliamentarians
- In office January 29, 2025 – March 23, 2025
- Prime Minister: Justin Trudeau; Mark Carney
- Preceded by: David McGuinty
- Succeeded by: Darren Fisher

Member of Parliament for Saint-Léonard—Saint-Michel
- Incumbent
- Assumed office October 21, 2019
- Preceded by: Nicola Di Iorio

Montreal City Councillor for Saint-Léonard-Est
- In office November 15, 2015 – 2019
- Preceded by: Domenico Moschella
- Succeeded by: Angela Gentile

Personal details
- Party: Liberal
- Other political affiliations: Ensemble Montréal
- Education: McGill University; University of Quebec at Montreal; University of Montreal

Patricia Lattanzio is a Canadian politician and lawyer of Italian descent, who was elected to the House of Commons of Canada in the 2019 Canadian federal election and re-elected in the 2021 Canadian federal election. She represents the electoral district of Saint-Léonard—Saint-Michel as a member of the Liberal Party of Canada.

She previously served on Montreal City Council, first winning her seat in a by-election on November 15, 2015, and was subsequently re-elected in the 2017 municipal election.

She served on the English Montreal School Board EMSB in 2007, and was re-elected in 2014. She was also the chair of the Comité de gestion de la taxe scolaire de l’île de Montréal.

== Early life ==
Lattanzio grew up in Saint-Léonard, in the riding she now represents in the House of Commons. As a young woman, she became involved in Michel Bissonnet's 1978 mayoral campaign in Saint-Léonard. She continued to volunteer on the subsequent electoral campaigns of Michel Bissonnet as MNA for the constituency of Jeanne-Mance–Viger.

She pursued studies at McGill University where she received a bachelor's degree with honours in political science. Later, she obtained a bachelor's degree in law from the University of Quebec at Montreal and a certificate in law from the University of Montreal. Lattanzio has been a member of the Quebec bar since 1990 and has practiced in the field of civil law for over 29 years.

== Political career ==
In 2004, she joined the governing board of École Honoré-Mercier, her children's elementary school. In 2007, she was elected school board commissioner for the Rivière-des-Prairies region at the English Montreal School Board, the largest English-language school board in Quebec. In 2014, she was elected to the same position, this time as the representative for the riding of Saint-Léonard. She was also voted president of the Comité de gestion de la taxe scolaire de l'île de Montréal, an organization run jointly by all of the school boards in the Montreal region.

In 2015, Lattanzio was elected city councillor for Saint-Léonard East in a by-election under the banner of Team Denis Coderre. She was re-elected as city councillor in the 2017 municipal election.

In 2019, she became the Liberal candidate for the riding of Saint-Léonard—St-Michel and was elected with the largest majority in the province of Quebec.

On January 20, 2022, she was appointed a member of the National Security and Intelligence Committee of Parliamentarians, NSICOP, and on January 29, 2025, was appointed Chair of the committee by Prime Minister Justin Trudeau. She has also been appointed as a member of the Standing Committee on Canadian Heritage since February 14, 2024.

MP Patricia Lattanzio is vice-president of the Quebec caucus. Additionally, in March 2024, she was elected as vice-chair of the Canadian Section of ParlAmericas (CPAM) and in April 2024, as vice-president of the Canada-Italy Interparliamentary Group (CAIT).

She previously served on the Special Committee on the COVID-19 Pandemic from April 20, 2020, to June 18, 2020, then on the Standing Committee of Official Languages from February 5, 2020, to September 25, 2023, as well as the Standing Committee on Access to Information, Privacy and Ethics from October 5, 2020, to August 15, 2021, and the Standing Joint Committee for the Scrutiny of Regulations from September 25, 2023, to February 14, 2024.

In 2021, MP Patricia Lattanzio presented a Private Member's Bill, C-252, The Child Health Protection Act. The bill aims to prohibit the marketing of foods and beverages that contain excessive amounts of sugar, salt and saturated fat to children under the age of 13. On October 25, 2023, the bill was adopted by a majority of votes in the House of Commons, and is currently in the Senate awaiting its adoption.

As a member of the Official Languages Committee, she and other members of Parliament pressured Statistics Canada to amend the 2021 census to include questions used to identify official language minority communities. These questions were ultimately included in the 2021 census.

Lattanzio is fluent in three languages: English, French and Italian.

== Electoral record ==
=== Federal ===
2025 Canadian federal election: Saint-Léonard—Saint-Michel
Party	Candidate	Votes	%	±%	Expenditures
Liberal	Patricia Lattanzio	26,833	65.34	−4.26	$70,487.76
Conservative	Panagiota Koroneos	8,457	20.59	+10.13	$0.00
Bloc Québécois	Laurie Lelacheur	2,938	7.15	−0.83	$3,049.13
New Democratic	Marwan El Attar	2,450	5.97	−2.23	$2,751.25
People's	Caroline Mailloux	388	0.94	−2.82	$18.03
Total valid votes/expense limit		41,066	97.73	–	$124,263.63
Total rejected ballots		955	2.27		
Turnout		42,021	58.23		
Eligible voters		72,160			
Liberal notional hold		Swing		−7.20	
Source: Elections Canada
Note: number of eligible voters does not include voting day registrations.

2021 Canadian federal election: Saint-Léonard—Saint-Michel
Party	Candidate	Votes	%	±%	Expenditures
Liberal	Patricia Lattanzio	29,010	69.40	+8.07	$55,649.86
Conservative	Louis Ialenti	4,381	10.50	-1.44	$0.00
New Democratic	Alicia Di Tullio	3,460	8.30	+1.78	$1,225.49
Bloc Québécois	Laurence Massey	3,395	8.10	-1.48	$2,242.01
People's	Daniele Ritacca	1,568	3.70	+2.60	$386.31
Total valid votes/expense limit		41,814	100.0		$108,432.19
Total rejected ballots		890	N/A		
Turnout		42,704	56.45	-3.93	
Eligible voters		74,279			
Liberal hold		Swing		+4.76	
Source: Elections Canada

2019 Canadian federal election: Saint-Léonard—Saint-Michel
Party	Candidate	Votes	%	±%	Expenditures
Liberal	Patricia Lattanzio	27,866	61.33	-3.40	$39,698.45
Conservative	Ilario Maiolo	5,423	11.94	+0.81	$50,901.27
Bloc Québécois	Dominique Mougin	4,351	9.58	+2.39	none listed
Independent	Hassan Guillet	3,061	6.74	–	none listed
New Democratic	Paulina Ayala	2,964	6.52	-8.33	$1,299.32
Green	Alessandra Szilagyi	1,183	2.60	0.79	$512.28
People's	Tina Di Serio	501	1.10	–	$1,392.50
Marxist–Leninist	Garnet Colly	85	0.19	-0.10	$0.00
Total valid votes		45,434	100.0		
Total rejected ballots		993	2.19		
Turnout		46,427	60.38	+1.16	
Eligible voters		76,885			
Liberal hold		Swing		-2.11	
Source: Elections Canada
