= Saint-Léonard—Anjou =

Former federal electoral district in Quebec, Canada

Quebec electoral district

Defunct federal electoral district
- Legislature: House of Commons
- District created: 1976
- District abolished: 1987
- First contested: 1979
- Last contested: 1984

Saint-Léonard—Anjou (French pronunciation: [sɛ̃ leɔnaʁ ɑ̃ʒu]; formerly known as Saint-Léonard) was a federal electoral district in Quebec, Canada that was represented in the House of Commons of Canada from 1979 to 1988.

This riding was created in 1976 as "Saint-Léonard" riding from parts of Maisonneuve—Rosemont, Mercier and Saint-Michel ridings. It consisted of the City of Saint-Léonard, the Town of Anjou, and part of the city of Montreal.

The electoral district was abolished in 1987 when it was redistributed into Anjou—Rivière-des-Prairies, Papineau and Saint-Léonard ridings.

== Members of Parliament ==
This riding elected the following members of Parliament:

Parliament	Years	Member	Party
Saint-Léonard—Anjou; Riding created from Maisonneuve—Rosemont, Mercier and Saint-Michel
31st	1979–1980	Monique Bégin	Liberal
32nd	1980–1984	Monique Bégin	Liberal
33rd	1984–1988	Alfonso Gagliano	Liberal
Riding dissolved into Anjou—Rivière-des-Prairies, Papineau and Saint-Léonard

== Election results ==
1979 Canadian federal election
Party	Candidate	Votes
Liberal	Monique Bégin	45,582
Social Credit	Réal Ménard	5,102
Progressive Conservative	Luciano Coraggio	3,556
New Democratic	Colette Lalancette-Deschamps	3,105
Rhinoceros	Joanne Noël	1,291
Union populaire	Alice Derome	268
Marxist–Leninist	Carole Commandeur-Laloux	176

1980 Canadian federal election
Party	Candidate	Votes
Liberal	Monique Bégin	42,228
New Democratic	Filippo Salvatore	3,741
Progressive Conservative	Pierre Gauthier	2,972
Rhinoceros	Pierre Guzzo-Céros	1,569
Social Credit	Gaétan Bernard	1,194
Union populaire	U. P. Nelson Bouchard	260
Marxist–Leninist	Caroline Commandeur-Laloux	91

1984 Canadian federal election
Party	Candidate	Votes
Liberal	Alfonso Gagliano	24,520
Progressive Conservative	Agostino Cannavino	23,275
New Democratic	Terrence Trudeau	7,506
Rhinoceros	Denis La Miuf Ouellet	2,152
Parti nationaliste	Pierre-Alain Cotnoir	1,634
Commonwealth of Canada	Jean Vigneault	145

== See also ==
- List of Canadian electoral districts
- Historical federal electoral districts of Canada
