= Cool Taxi =

Cool Taxi is a system of prepaid coupons which can be used to pay for taxicab fares in the Canadian province of Quebec. It is marketed as a way to encourage passengers to take a taxicab rather than driving while intoxicated or with a driver who is intoxicated, especially on New Year's Eve. The system was initially conceptualized by M. Carol Rancourt and was then introduced in 2010 by three men, fathers of three teenagers who were seriously injured in a car crash caused by a drunken driver, and received the support of Sam Hamad, Quebec's minister of transportation. The coupons can only be used for taxi fares and cannot be exchanged for cash, except that a driver will give change when the value of the coupons tendered by a passenger is more than the fare. The coupons are in denominations of $5 and $10, and incorporate some anti-counterfeiting techniques which are also used in cheques and banknotes. The plan is operated by Comité provincial de concertation et de développement de l'industrie du taxi, a trade association for the taxi industry in Quebec. Coupons can be purchased from the offices of taxi companies, Couche-Tard convenience stores and Familiprix pharmacies.

In June 2014, about 80 high school students in La Tuque, Quebec, each received 10-dollar Cool Taxi coupons provided by the city of La Tuque and the Sûreté du Québec provincial police so that the students could get home safely after their graduation dance.

In December 2012, $10,000 worth of Taxi Cool coupons were distributed in bars in Montreal and Montérégie to encourage drinkers to take a taxi home.

== Unrelated company in the United States ==
An unrelated company with a similar name, Cool Taxi LLC, is located in Hampton, Virginia.
