= Alfonso Gagliano =

Canadian politician (1942–2020)

The Honourable Alfonso Gagliano PC

Canadian Ambassador to Denmark
- In office January 15, 2002 – September 22, 2004
- Prime Minister: Jean Chrétien
- Preceded by: Mary Simon
- Succeeded by: Fredericka Gregory

Deputy Leader of the Government in the House of Commons
- In office September 15, 1994 – January 14, 2002
- Prime Minister: Jean Chrétien
- Leader: Herb Gray; Don Boudria; Ralph Goodale
- Preceded by: Fernand Robichaud
- Succeeded by: Paul DeVillers
Canadian Cabinet
Minister of Public Works and Government Services
In office June 11, 1997 – January 14, 2002
Prime Minister	Jean Chrétien
Preceded by	Diane Marleau
Succeeded by	Don Boudria
Minister of Labour
In office January 25, 1996 – June 10, 1997
Prime Minister	Jean Chrétien
Preceded by	Lucienne Robillard
Succeeded by	Lawrence MacAulay
Secretary of State (Parliamentary Affairs)
In office September 15, 1994 – January 24, 1996
Prime Minister	Jean Chrétien
Minister	Herb Gray
Preceded by	Fernand Robichaud
Succeeded by	Position abolished
Early political career
Chief Government Whip
In office November 4, 1993 – September 14, 1994
Prime Minister	Jean Chrétien
Leader	Herb Gray
Preceded by	Jim Edwards
Succeeded by	Don Boudria
Chief Opposition Whip
In office January 31, 1991 – September 8, 1993
Prime Minister	Brian Mulroney; Kim Campbell
Leader	Jean Chrétien
Preceded by	David Dingwall
Succeeded by	Gilles Duceppe
Parliamentary constituencies
Member of Parliament for Saint-Léonard—Saint-Michel (Saint-Léonard—Anjou; 1984–1988)
In office September 4, 1984 – January 15, 2002
Preceded by	Monique Bégin
Succeeded by	Massimo Pacetti

Personal details
- Born: January 25, 1942 Siculiana, Sicily, Kingdom of Italy
- Died: December 12, 2020 (aged 78)
- Party: Liberal

Alfonso Gagliano PC (Italian pronunciation: [alˈfɔnso gaʎˈʎaːno]; 25 January 1942 – 12 December 2020) was a Canadian accountant and politician.

== Early life and family ==
Born in Siculiana, Italy, Gagliano immigrated to Montreal in 1958. His political career began in 1977 when he ran for a seat on the then Jérôme-LeRoyer school board, which no longer exists and used to cover the East End of Montreal Island.

In 1965, Gagliano married Ersilia Gidaro and with her bore three children; Vincenzo, Maria and Immacolata.

== Political career ==
In the 1984 federal election, he ran for Parliament for Saint-Léonard—Anjou narrowly defeating the Progressive Conservative candidate. It was one of the few ridings that the Liberals retained, as they were swept out of power in a massive Conservative landslide. He was re-elected in the 1988 and 1993 elections representing Saint-Léonard, and in the 1997 and 2000 elections representing Saint-Léonard—Saint-Michel.

From 1996 to 2002, he served in various cabinet posts including Minister of Labour, Deputy House leader and the Minister responsible for Communications Canada, Canada Post, the Canada Mortgage and Housing Corporation, the Royal Canadian Mint and Canada Lands Company Ltd. His most controversial positions were as Minister of Public Works and Government Services and as political minister for Quebec.

Following his career as a cabinet minister, Gagliano was appointed as the Canadian ambassador to Denmark after having been rejected by the Vatican for a similar posting. However, he was dismissed from this position on February 10, 2004 by Governor General Adrienne Clarkson, on the advice of Foreign Affairs Minister Bill Graham, amidst widespread speculation that during his time as public works minister he was actively involved in the sponsorship scandal.

== Aftermath ==
On May 27, 2004, Gagliano filed a more than $4.5-million lawsuit against Prime Minister Paul Martin and the government. The suit accused the defendants of deliberately attacking Gagliano's reputation and alleged that he was illegally and unjustly fired. He sought compensation for wrongful dismissal, damage to his reputation and lost income. The lawsuit was eventually dismissed.

Justice John Gomery's initial report on the sponsorship scandal places much of the blame on Gagliano, making him the highest ranking Liberal to be charged with deliberate dishonesty, rather than negligence. Following the initial report, Paul Martin expelled him from the Liberal Party for life.

On November 17, 2004, an article in the New York Daily News alleged that Gagliano was associated with the Bonanno crime family of New York City. In the article, former capo Frank Lino, turned informant for the U.S. Federal Bureau of Investigation, is quoted as saying Gagliano was first introduced to him during a meeting with other mob members in Montreal in the early 1990s. Lino also stated that Gagliano was a made man of the Mafia. It was not the first time Gagliano's name has been linked to organized crime. In April 1994, La Presse reported that Gagliano was the accountant for Agostino Cuntrera, cousin of cocaine baron Alfonso Caruana, also a native of Siculiana, who was convicted in the gangland slaying of Paolo Violi in Montreal in 1978. Gagliano denied any links to the Mafia. Since August 2008, Gagliano resided with his family on a vineyard in Dunham, Quebec he purchased.

In September 2006, he argued that Liberal leadership candidate Joe Volpe was the victim of the same kind of anti-Italian sentiment that ended his own political career.

== Electoral record (partial) ==
1993 Canadian federal election: Saint-Léonard
Party	Candidate	Votes	%	±%	Expenditures
Liberal	Alfonso Gagliano	28,799	61.16	+10.91	$54,669
Bloc Québécois	Umberto di Genova	12,879	27.35		$16,644
Progressive Conservative	Tony Tomassi	4,021	8.54	−28.70	$36,146a
New Democratic Party	David D'Andrea	583	1.24	−8.94	$0
Natural Law	Marlène Charland	499	1.06		$269
Marxist-Leninist	Claude Brunelle	141	0.30		$80
Abolitionist	Mauro Fusco	91	0.19		$0
Commonwealth	Sylvain Deschênes	77	0.16		$0
Total valid votes		47,090	100.00		
Total rejected ballots		1,342			
Turnout		48,432	79.78	+5.29	
Electors on the lists		60,710			
a Does not include unpaid claims. Source: Thirty-fifth General Election, 1993: Official Voting Results, Published by the Chief Electoral Officer of Canada. Financial figures taken from the official contributions and expenses submitted by the candidates, provided by Elections Canada.

1988 Canadian federal election: Saint-Léonard—Saint-Michel
Party	Candidate	Votes	%	±%	Expenditures
Liberal	Alfonso Gagliano	23,014	50.25	–	$44,847
Progressive Conservative	Marc Beaudoin	17,055	37.24		$43,281
New Democratic	Michel Roche	4,663	10.18		$742
Green	Rolf Bramann	833	1.82		$140
Independent	Bernard Papillon	231	0.50		$130
Total valid votes		45,796	100.00		
Total rejected ballots		1,018			
Turnout		46,814	74.49		
Electors on the lists		62,845			
Source: Report of the Chief Electoral Officer, Thirty-fourth General Election, 1988.

1984 Canadian federal election: Saint-Léonard—Anjou
Party	Candidate	Votes	%
Liberal	Alfonso Gagliano	24,520	41.40
Progressive Conservative	Agostino Cannavino	23,275	39.29
New Democratic	Terrence Trudeau	7,506	12.67
Rhinoceros	Denis La Miuf Ouellet	2,152	3.63
Parti nationaliste	Pierre-Alain Cotnoir	1,634	2.76
Commonwealth of Canada	Jean Vigneault	145	0.24
Total valid votes		59,232	100.00
Total rejected ballots		1,163	
Turnout		60,395	73.97
Electors on the lists		81,646	
Source: Report of the Chief Electoral Officer, Thirty-third General Election, 1984.

26th Canadian Ministry (1993–2003) – Cabinet of Jean Chrétien
Cabinet posts (2)
Predecessor	Office	Successor
Diane Marleau	Minister of Public Works and Government Services; 1997–2002	Don Boudria
Lucienne Robillard	Minister of Labour; 1996–1997	Lawrence MacAulay
Sub-Cabinet Post
Predecessor	Title	Successor
Fernand Robichaud	Secretary of State (Parliamentary Affairs) (1994–1996)	
Special Parliamentary Responsibilities
Predecessor	Title	Successor
Fernand Robichaud	Deputy Leader of the Government in the House of Commons; 1994–2002	Paul DeVillers
Parliament of Canada
Preceded by Monique Bégin	Member of Parliament for Saint-Léonard—Saint-Michel; 1984-2002	Succeeded by Massimo Pacetti
Diplomatic posts
Preceded by Mary Simon	Ambassador Extraordinary and Plenipotentiary to Denmark; 2002-2004	Succeeded by Fredericka Gregory
