= Winnipeg—Birds Hill =

Former federal electoral district in Manitoba, Canada

Location of the riding

Winnipeg—Birds Hill was a federal electoral district in Manitoba, Canada, that was represented in the House of Commons of Canada from 1979 to 1988.

This riding was created in 1976 from parts of Selkirk and St. Boniface ridings. It was contested at federal elections in 1979, 1980, and 1984. For its entire history, its Member of Parliament was New Democrat Bill Blaikie.

Boundary redistribution in 1987 abolished Winnipeg—Birds Hill. Its territory outside the city of Winnipeg plus the North Kildonan area was reassigned to Selkirk (later Selkirk—Red River), while the rest of its urban territory went to Winnipeg Transcona. Blaikie continued to serve as MP for Winnipeg Transcona under that name, and later the name of Elmwood—Transcona, from the 1988 federal election until he retired from Parliament in 2008.

== Election results ==
1984 Canadian federal election
Party	Candidate	Votes	%	±%
New Democratic	Bill Blaikie	23,903	45.81	−8.47
Progressive Conservative	John Hare	20,644	39.56	+10.12
Liberal	Lil Johnson	5,447	10.44	−5.00
Confederation of Regions	Al MacDonald	1,069	2.05	
Rhinoceros	Honest Don Bergen	569	1.09	+0.38
Independent	Edward G. Price	549	1.05	
Total valid votes		52,181	100.00	
Total rejected ballots		163		
Turnout		52,344	76.70	+7.32
Electors on the lists		68,248		
New Democratic hold		Swing		−9.29

1980 Canadian federal election
Party	Candidate	Votes	%	±%
New Democratic	Bill Blaikie	24,672	54.27	+4.11
Progressive Conservative	John Froese	13,385	29.44	−9.00
Liberal	Ron Wally	7,020	15.44	+4.28
Rhinoceros	Honest Don Bergen	322	0.71	–
Marxist–Leninist	Karen Naylor	60	0.13	+0.02
Total valid votes		Total valid votes	45,459	100.00
Total rejected ballots		84		
Turnout		45,543	69.38	−12.28
Electors on the lists		65,647		
New Democratic hold		Swing		+6.55

1979 Canadian federal election
Party	Candidate	Votes	%
New Democratic	Bill Blaikie	25,492	50.16
Progressive Conservative	Dean Whiteway	19,536	38.44
Liberal	Ronald Wally	5,674	11.16
Communist	Harold J. Dyck	62	0.12
Marxist–Leninist	Karen Naylor	56	0.11
Total valid votes		50,820	100.00
Total rejected ballots		107	
Turnout		50,927	81.66
Electors on the lists		62,361	

== See also ==
- List of Canadian electoral districts
- Historical federal electoral districts of Canada
