= Manuel Carballo (epidemiologist) =

Manuel Carballo (born 1941) is an epidemiologist and Executive Director of the International Centre for Migration, Health and Development and former Professor of Clinical Public Health at the Mailman School of Public Health, Columbia University, in New York.

== Background ==
Manuel Carballo is from Gibraltar and studied in the United Kingdom.

He worked with the World Health Organization in a number of countries. In the 1980s he was responsible for leading WHO's international collaborative study on breast feeding and the impact of breast-milk substitutes on infant and maternal health; he then organised the International Code of Marketing of Breast-milk Substitutes which today guides the infant food industry's role in this domain of health. In 1986, he was one of the three-person team chosen to set up the WHO Global Programme on AIDS (GPA) and remained with GPA until 1992 as Chief of Behavioural Research. At WHO and GPA he was also responsible for helping 18 countries in Africa to set up their National AIDS Committees and develop their national plans. In 1993 he went to Bosnia as the WHO Public Health Advisor and remained based in Sarajevo, responsible for the whole of Bosnia and Herzegovina, until the end of the war in 1995. On his return from Bosnia he joined the International Centre for Migration, Health and Development (ICMHD), a Swiss-based research and training organisation. He later went to Albania and Macedonia for the United Nations to assess the health situation of refugees fleeing Kosovo. In 2001 he became Executive Director of ICMHD. In 2002-2003 he headed two health evaluation missions for the United Nations in the occupied Palestinian territories and Iraq. In 2004, he headed the UNFPA tsunami relief and reconstruction mission to the Maldives and Sri Lanka. In 2005 and 2006 he was based in Iran and Afghanistan developing emergency preparedness plans. In 2014, he was awarded an Honorary Doctor of Science by the Glasgow Caledonian University for his contribution to global health and academic research.

He is a specialist on health issues of migrants and refugees and also has worked extensively on HIV prevention programmes with uniformed services and peacekeeping forces. He is a founding member of the UNAIDS Uniformed Services Task Force.

== Publications ==
- Migration, Refugees, and Health Risks
- Mental Health And Coping In A War Situation:The Case Of Bosnia And Herzegovina
- Psychosocial aspects of the Tsunami
- Impact of the Tsunami on reproductive health
