= 1980 Canadian federal election =

Canadian election which resulted in a Liberal majority

- February 18, 1980 (Note: In Frontenac, the election was postponed to March 24 following the death of Social Credit candidate Nelson Lassard.)

282 seats in the House of Commons 142 seats needed for a majority
- Turnout: 69.3% (▼6.4 pp)
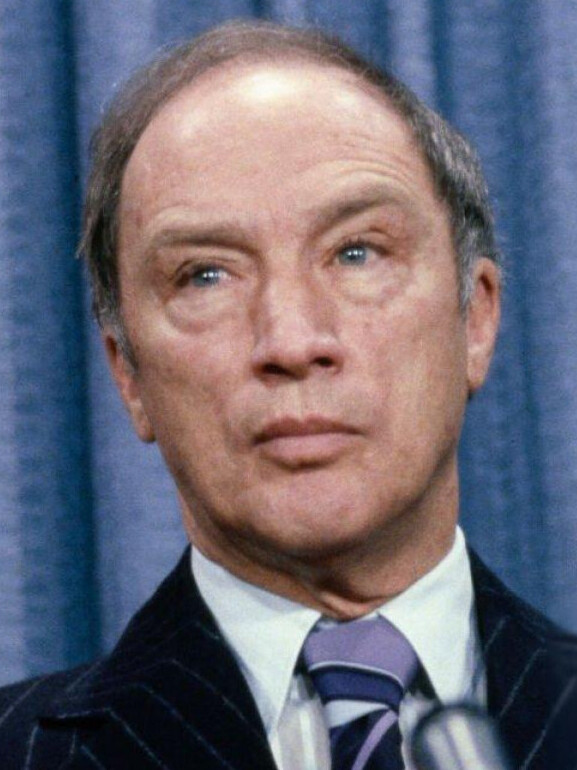

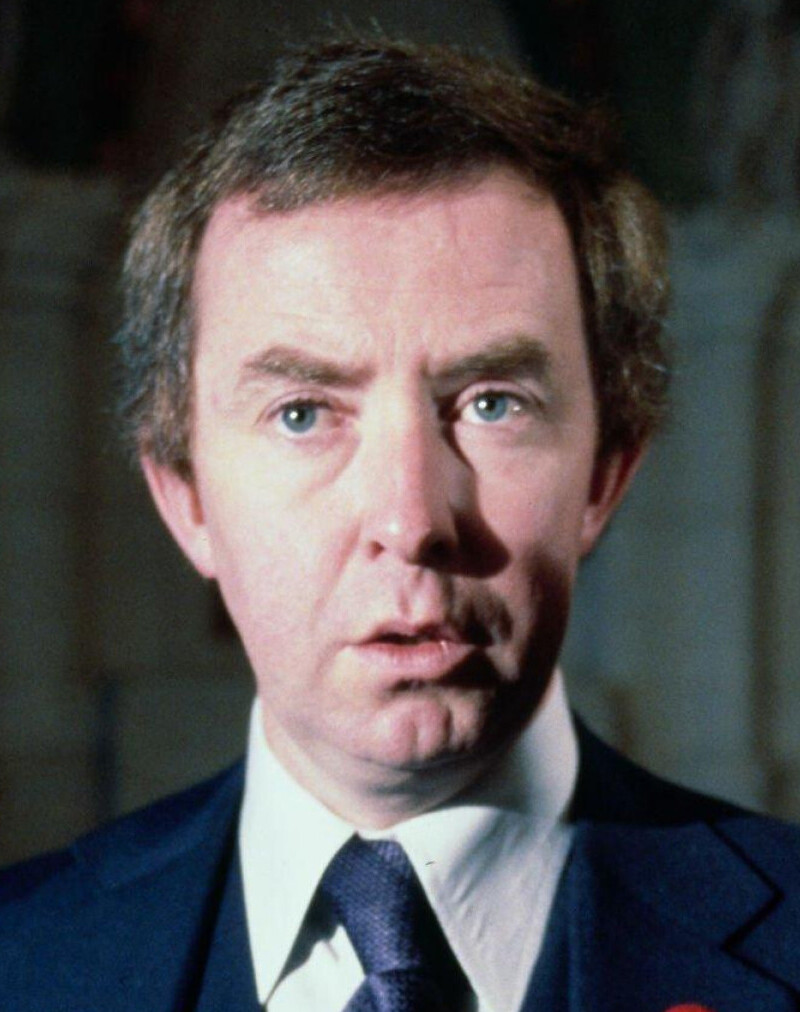

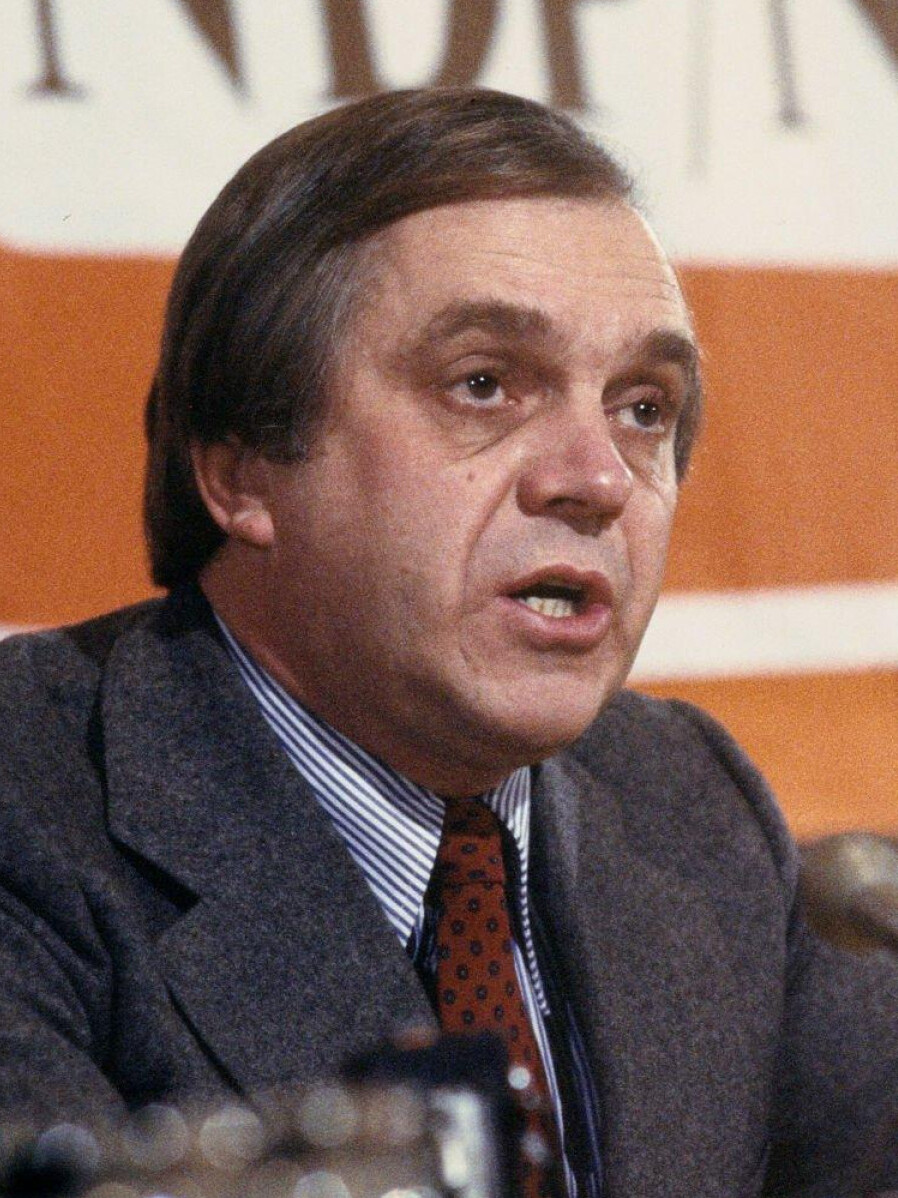
	First party	Second party
Leader	Pierre Trudeau	Joe Clark
Party	Liberal	Progressive Conservative
Leader since	April 6, 1968	February 22, 1976
Leader's seat	Mount Royal	Yellowhead
Last election	114 seats, 40.11%	136 seats, 35.89%
Seats before	114	136
Seats won	147	103
Seat change	▲33	▼33
Popular vote	4,855,425	3,552,994
Percentage	44.34%	32.45%
Swing	▲4.23 pp	▼3.44 pp
	Third party	Fourth party
		SC
Leader	Ed Broadbent	Fabien Roy
Party	New Democratic	Social Credit
Leader since	July 7, 1975	March 30, 1979
Leader's seat	Oshawa	Beauce (Note: After being defeated in Beauce, Roy was a candidate in the delayed election in Frontenac, which was postponed to March 24 following the death of Social Credit candidate Nelson Lassard. Roy was also defeated in this riding.) (lost re-election)
Last election	26 seats, 17.88%	6 seats, 4.61%
Seats before	27	5
Seats won	32	0
Seat change	▲5	▼5
Popular vote	2,165,087	185,486
Percentage	19.77%	1.70%
Swing	▲1.89 pp	▼2.91 pp
Prime Minister before election
Joe Clark
Progressive Conservative
Prime Minister after election
Pierre Trudeau
Liberal

The 1980 Canadian federal election was held on February 18, 1980, to elect members of the House of Commons of Canada of the 32nd Parliament of Canada. It was called when the budget of the minority Progressive Conservative government led by Prime Minister Joe Clark was defeated in the Commons. As of 2025, it remains the most recent election triggered by the defeat of a government budget in the Commons. The Liberal Party under former Prime Minister Pierre Trudeau won a narrow majority, returning Trudeau to the Premiership for a fourth and ultimately final term. This is the most recent election – and the first since 1935 – in which a sitting government was defeated at the polls after only one elected term. This is also the most recent election in which the Liberals won more seats in Quebec than in the rest of Canada – since this election, no party has ever bested the Liberals' 74-seat showing in Quebec.

== Background ==
Clark and his government had been under attack for its perceived inexperience, for example in its handling of its 1979 election campaign commitment to move Canada's embassy in Israel from Tel Aviv to the hotly disputed territory of Jerusalem.

Clark had maintained uneasy relations with the conservative-populist Quebec-based Social Credit Party (nicknamed the Socreds), who were the fourth largest party in the House of Commons. While he needed support from the party's six MPs to get legislation passed, he was unwilling to agree to the conditions they imposed for their support. Clark recruited one Social Credit MP, Richard Janelle, to join the PC caucus.

In December 1979, just six months after the 1979 election, Clark's government could not collect enough votes in the House of Commons to survive. Clark's Minister of Finance, John Crosbie, introduced an austere government budget that proposed to increase the excise tax on gasoline by 18¢ per Imperial gallon (about 4¢ a litre) to reduce the federal government's deficit. The New Democratic Party's finance critic, Bob Rae, proposed a subamendment to the budget motion, stating that the House of Commons did not approve of the budget. The NDP's 27 MPs were set against the budget. The five remaining Social Credit MPs abstained, upset that the revenues from the increased gas tax were not allocated to Quebec.

In addition, one Tory MP (Alvin Hamilton) was too ill to attend the vote while two others (Flora MacDonald and Lloyd Crouse) were abroad. Meanwhile, the Liberals assembled all but one member of their caucus (Serge Joyal), even going as far as to take two MPs (Maurice Dionne and Claude Lajoie) out of the hospital for the vote. Rae's subamendment was adopted by a vote of 139–133, bringing down the government and forcing an election.

Former Liberal Prime Minister Pierre Trudeau, who had served since 1968, had announced his resignation as leader of the Liberal Party following its defeat in 1979. However, no leadership convention had been held when Clark's Progressive Conservative government fell. Trudeau quickly rescinded his resignation and led the party to victory, winning 33 more seats than in 1979. That enabled the Liberals to form a majority government.

Clark's Tories campaigned under the slogan "Real change deserves a fair chance", but less than a third of voters voted to give Clark another chance. The loss of the budget vote just seven months into his mandate and his subsequent defeat in the February 18 general election resulted in his ouster as leader by Brian Mulroney in 1983.

The Socreds' abstention on the crucial budget vote, even if not decisive (the vote would still have passed by 139–138 had they opposed it), contributed to a perception that the party had become irrelevant since the death of iconic leader Réal Caouette in 1976. In 1980 it ran 20 fewer candidates than it had run in 1979 and lost more than three-fifths of its vote share. It lost all of its seats to Liberal challengers, though all but one of its incumbent MPs posted respectable second-place finishes. After having been the third- or fourth-largest party in the country for most of its existence, Social Credit rapidly declined into obscurity. It would never come remotely close to winning seats again, although the party nominally continued to exist until 1993.

The new House was very regionally polarized. The Liberals were shut out of seats west of Manitoba, although receiving more than 20 per cent of the vote in each western province. The Liberal party piled up massive seat counts in the two most populous provinces to achieve their victory. Liberal candidates collected more than two thirds of the votes cast in Quebec, and the party took half its seats in just that one province. The Tories won only one seat out of 75 in Quebec, though they took 12 per cent of the vote there. The Tories won 43 per cent of the seats in the four Atlantic provinces, which helped them elect more than a hundred MPs overall. All but 14 of them were elected in ridings west of Quebec.

== Opinion polling ==
National polling showed:

Evolution of voting intentions at national level
Polling firm	Last day of survey	Source	LPC	PC	NDP	SC	Other	ME	Sample
Election 1980	February 18, 1980		44.34	32.45	19.77	1.70	1.74		
Gallup	February 1980		48	28	23	—N/a	—N/a	—N/a	—N/a
CTV	February 15, 1980		43	33	22	—N/a	—N/a	—N/a	2,000
CTV	February 1, 1980		46	33	17	—N/a	4	—N/a	2,039
Gallup	January 1980		49	28	20	—N/a	—N/a	—N/a	—N/a
Gallup	September 1979		41	37	19	—N/a	3	4.0	—N/a
Gallup	July 1979		43	38	20	—N/a	3	4.0	—N/a
Gallup	June 1979		40	38	18	—N/a	—N/a	—N/a	—N/a
Election 1979	May 22, 1979		40.11	35.89	17.88	4.61	1.51		

=== Quebec ===
Evolution of voting intentions at national level
Polling firm	Last day of survey	Source	LPC	PC	NDP	SC	Other	ME	Sample
Election 1980	February 18, 1980		68.2	12.6	9.1	5.9	4.2		
QIPO	December 22, 1979		74	11	11	4	—N/a	4	699
Election 1979	May 22, 1979		61.7	13.5	5.1	16.0	3.7		

== National results ==
Party	Party leader	# of candidates	Seats				Popular vote		
Party	Party leader	# of candidates	1979	Dissolution	Elected	% Change	#	%	Change
Liberal	Pierre Trudeau	282	114	114	147	+28.9%	4,855,425	44.34%	+4.23pp
Progressive Conservative	Joe Clark	282	136	136	103	-24.3%	3,552,994	32.45%	-3.44pp
New Democratic Party	Ed Broadbent	280	26	27	32	+23.1%	2,165,087	19.77%	+1.89pp
Social Credit	Fabien Roy	81	6	5	-	-100%	185,486	1.70%	-2.91pp
Rhinoceros	Cornelius I	121	-	-	-		110,597	1.01%	+0.46pp
Marxist–Leninist	Hardial Bains	177	-	-	-	-	14,728	0.13%	+0.01pp
Libertarian		58	-	-	-	-	14,656	0.13%	-0.01pp
Union populaire		54	-	-	-	-	14,474	0.13%	-0.04pp
Independent		55	-	-	-	-	14,472	0.13%	-0.13pp
Unknown		41	-	-	-	-	12,532	0.11%	-0.07pp
Communist	William Kashtan	52	-	-	-	-	6,022	0.05%	-0.02pp
No affiliation		14	-	-	-	-	3,063	0.03%	+0.03pp
Total		1,497	282	282	282	-	10,949,536	100%	
Sources: Elections Canada, History of Federal Ridings since 1867

Notes:

"% change" refers to change from previous election.

Changes to party standings from previous election: Social Credit MP Richard Janelle crossed the floor to join the PC Party. PC MP John Diefenbaker died during the parliamentary session. New Democrat MP Stan Hovdebo was elected in the subsequent by-election.

== Vote and seat summaries ==
Ternary plots - shift of electoral support (1979-1980)
1979

1980
Electoral districts identified by colours of winning parties

Popular vote
Liberal	44.34%
PC	32.45%
NDP	19.77%
Social Credit	1.70%
Others	1.74%

Seat totals
Liberal	52.12%
PC	36.52%
NDP	11.34%

== Results by province and territory ==
Party name		BC	AB	SK	MB	ON	QC	NB	NS	PE	NL	NT	YK	Total
Liberal	Seats:	-	-	-	2	52	74	7	5	2	5	-	-	147
Liberal	Popular Vote:	22.2	22.2	24.3	28.0	41.9	68.2	50.1	39.9	46.8	47.0	35.8	39.6	44.3
Progressive Conservative	Seats:	16	21	7	5	38	1	3	6	2	2	1	1	103
Progressive Conservative	Vote:	41.5	64.9	38.9	37.7	35.5	12.6	32.5	38.7	46.3	36.0	24.7	40.6	32.4
New Democratic Party	Seats:	12	-	7	7	5	-	-	-	-	-	1	-	32
New Democratic Party	Vote:	35.3	10.3	36.3	33.5	21.8	9.1	16.2	20.9	6.6	16.7	38.4	19.8	19.8
Total seats:		28	21	14	14	95	75	10	11	4	7	2	1	282
Parties that won no seats:
Social Credit	Vote:	0.1	1.0	xx		xx	5.9							1.7
Rhinoceros	Vote:	0.4	0.7	0.1	0.4	0.2	3.0	0.5	0.2			1.1		1.0
Marxist–Leninist	Vote:	0.1	0.1	0.1	0.2	0.1	0.2	xx	xx	xx	0.1			0.1
Libertarian	Vote:			xx		0.3	0.1	xx						0.1
Union populaire	Vote:						0.5							0.1
Independent	Vote:	0.3	0.3	0.1	xx	0.1	0.1	0.1	0.4	0.3	0.1			0.1
Non-Affiliated	Vote:	xx	0.5	0.2	0.1	xx	0.2	0.3			0.1			0.1
Communist	Vote:	0.1	0.1	xx	0.1	0.1	xx							0.1
No affiliation	Vote:					xx	0.1	0.1						xx

xx - less than 0.05% of the popular vote.

== Notes ==
- Number of parties: 9
  - First appearance: none
  - Final appearance: Union populaire
  - Final appearance before hiatus: Marxist–Leninist Party of Canada (returned in 1993)

== See also ==
- List of Canadian federal general elections
- List of political parties in Canada
- 32nd Canadian Parliament

Articles on parties' candidates in this election:

- Independent
- Liberal
- Libertarian
- New Democrats
- Progressive Conservative
- Rhinoceros
