= Union populaire =

The Union populaire was a Quebec-based federal political party in Canada during the 1970s and 1980s. It nominated candidates in the 1979 and 1980 federal elections. The party also nominated one candidate in the 4 May 1981 by-election in the riding of Levis, Quebec.

The aim of the party was to promote the cause of independence for the Province of Quebec in federal elections.

The party gained little support, and was not supported by the Parti Québécois, the pro-independence party that formed the government of the province at the time. That party had a long-standing policy of not participating in federal politics.

The Union populaire was succeeded by the Parti nationaliste du Québec in the 1984 federal election, and subsequently by the Bloc Québécois.

Only one candidate, Andre Cote from Beauce, ran for both the UP and the Bloc; he was defeated in the 2008 election.

== Election results ==
Election	# of candidates nominated	# of seats won	# of total votes	% of popular vote
1979	69	0	19,514	0.17%
1980	54	0	14,474	0.13%

== See also ==
- List of Canadian political parties
- Secessionist movements of Canada
