= Canadian federal election results in Rural Manitoba =

Electoral history
Year	Results
2015	
2011	
2008	
2006	
2004	
2000	
1997	
1993	
1988	
1984	
1980	
1979	
1974	
1972	
1968	
1965	
1963	
1962	
1958	
1957	
1953	
1949	
1945	
1926	
1925	

This is page shows results of Canadian federal elections in the province of Manitoba outside the Winnipeg area.

== Regional profile ==
Rural Manitoba is, for the most part, a strongly conservative area (especially on social issues), though it becomes far less strident the further one gets from the U.S. border. The rural portions of southern Manitoba are similar to the rural portions of the Central United States, as well as rural portions of Saskatchewan and Alberta. Not only are they heavily agricultural, but they are some of the most religious areas in Canada. The Conservatives hold all five rural ridings in the south, with their largest margins of victory in the three ridings on the U.S. border. The Liberals swept the region in 1993, and managed to hold on to two ridings here in 1997. However, they have barely been on the radar screen since the turn of the millennium.

Northern Manitoba is home to only one riding: Churchill—Keewatinook Aski (formerly Churchill, from 1935 until 2015), which has been in NDP hands for all but six years since 1979. Former NDP MP Bev Desjarlais lost the nomination to Niki Ashton in 2006 and ran unsuccessfully as an independent; the Liberals were able to pick up Churchill with star candidate Tina Keeper. Ashton reclaimed Churchill for the NDP in the next election in 2008, however, and has continued to represent it since then.

=== Votes by party throughout time ===
Election	Liberal	Conservative	New Democratic	Green	People's	PC	Reform / Alliance	Social Credit	Others
1979	41,511; 19.0%	—N/a	65,493; 30.1%	—N/a	—N/a	109,938; 50.5%	—N/a	649; 0.3%	319; 0.1%
1980	49,815; 23.5%	—N/a	66,698; 31.4%	—N/a	—N/a	94,098; 44.4%	—N/a	—N/a	1,528; 0.7%
1984	30,855; 14.1%	—N/a	53,207; 24.3%	—N/a	—N/a	103,558; 47.3%	—N/a	—N/a	31,186; 14.3%
1988	65,316; 26.6%	—N/a	56,027; 22.8%	—N/a	—N/a	104,859; 42.7%	11,514; 4.7%	—N/a	7,798; 3.2%
1993	87,748; 35.5%	—N/a	39,692; 16.0%	—N/a	—N/a	40,262; 16.3%	72,364; 29.2%	—N/a	7,375; 3.0%
1997	51,222; 25.0%	—N/a	38,480; 18.8%	—N/a	—N/a	47,152; 23.0%	66,256; 32.3%	—N/a	1,838; 0.9%
2000	51,313; 24.6%	—N/a	32,974; 15.8%	—N/a	—N/a	31,908; 15.3%	88,191; 42.2%	—N/a	4,493; 2.2%
2004	47,143; 23.7%	103,593; 52.1%	39,704; 20.0%	5,487; 2.8%	—N/a	—N/a	—N/a	—N/a	2,957; 1.5%
2006	37,736; 17.5%	115,796; 53.7%	46,531; 21.6%	8,347; 3.9%	—N/a	—N/a	—N/a	—N/a	7,191; 3.3%
2008	24,361; 12.9%	110,104; 58.3%	36,509; 19.3%	14,760; 7.8%	—N/a	—N/a	—N/a	—N/a	3,244; 1.7%
2011	14,762; 7.4%	127,752; 63.7%	48,226; 24.0%	8,309; 4.1%	—N/a	—N/a	—N/a	—N/a	1,530; 0.8%
2015	81,827; 33.0%	118,795; 47.9%	31,734; 12.8%	9,778; 3.9%	—N/a	—N/a	—N/a	—N/a	5,809; 2.3%
2019	33,061; 13.3%	151,495; 61.1%	42,380; 17.1%	14,516; 5.9%	4,614; 1.9%	—N/a	—N/a	—N/a	1,936; 0.8%
2021	34,019; 14.2%	126,202; 52.7%	43,090; 18.0%	3,988; 1.7%	29,749; 12.4%	—N/a	—N/a	—N/a	2,417; 1.0%
2025	65,985; 25.4%	159,814; 61.6%	27,352; 10.5%	2,580; 1.0%	3,367; 1.3%	—N/a	—N/a	—N/a	413; 0.2%

Liberal Conservative New Democratic Green People's	Progressive Conservative (defunct) Alliance (defunct) Reform (defunct) Social Credit (defunct)

== Detailed results ==
=== 2025 ===
Electoral district	Candidates						Incumbent
Electoral district	Liberal	Conservative	NDP	Green	PPC	United	Incumbent
Brandon—Souris	Ghazanfar Ali Tarar; 10,766; 23.4%	Grant Jackson; 28,624; 62.2%	Quentin Robinson; 6,637; 14.4%				Larry Maguire^{$}
Churchill—Keewatinook Aski	Rebecca Chartrand; 9,313; 45.5%	Lachlan De Nardi; 4,927; 24.1%	Niki Ashton; 5,880; 28.7%		Dylan Young; 349; 1.7%		Niki Ashton
Portage—Lisgar	Robert Kreis; 10,493; 22.8%	Branden Leslie; 31,889; 69.4%	Lisa Tessier; 2,011; 4.4%	Janine G. Gibson; 595; 1.3%	Kevin Larson; 977; 2.1%		Branden Leslie
Provencher	Trevor Kirczenow; 13,394; 25.9%	Ted Falk; 34,364; 66.3%	Brandy Schmidt; 2,398; 4.6%	Blair Mahaffy; 705; 1.4%	Noël Gautron; 942; 1.8%		Ted Falk
Riding Mountain	Terry Hayward; 9,281; 22.2%	Dan Mazier; 28,409; 67.8%	Andrew Douglas Maxwell; 3,072; 7.3%	Liz Clayton; 547; 1.3%	Jim Oliver; 564; 1.3%		Dan Mazier; Dauphin—Swan River—Neepawa
Selkirk—Interlake—Eastman	Rhonda Nichol; 16,570; 30.4%	James Bezan; 32,788; 60.2%	Josef Estabrooks; 3,535; 6.5%	Wayne James; 709; 1.3%	Byron Gryba; 473; 0.9%	Chris Riddell; 404; 0.7%	James Bezan

=== 2021 ===
Electoral district	Candidates						Incumbent
Electoral district	Liberal	Conservative	NDP	Green	PPC	Other	Incumbent
Brandon—Souris	Linda Branconnier; 4,608; 12.08%	Larry Maguire; 22,733; 59.57%	Whitney Hodgins; 7,838; 20.54%		Tylor Baer; 2,981; 7.81%		Larry Maguire
Churchill—Keewatinook Aski	Shirley Robinson; 4,514; 25.18%	Charlotte Larocque; 4,330; 24.15%	Niki Ashton; 7,632; 42.57%	Ralph McLean; 552; 3.08%	Dylan Young; 899; 5.01%		Niki Ashton
Dauphin—Swan River—Neepawa	Kevin Carlson; 4,892; 12.70%	Dan Mazier; 22,718; 58.99%	Arthur Holroyd; 5,678; 14.74%	Shirley Lambrecht; 835; 2.17%	Donnan McKenna; 4,052; 10.52%	Lori Falloon-Austin (Mav.); 339; 0.88%	Dan Mazier
Portage—Lisgar	Andrew Carrier; 4,967; 10.95%	Candice Bergen; 23,819; 52.52%	Ken Friesen; 6,068; 13.38%		Solomon Wiebe; 9,790; 21.58%	Jerome Dondo (CHP); 712; 1.57%	Candice Bergen
Provencher	Trevor Kirczenow; 8,471; 16.98%	Ted Falk; 24,294; 48.68%	Serina Pottinger; 6,270; 12.56%	Janine G. Gibson; 1,273; 2.55%	Nöel Gautron; 8,227; 16.49%	Rick Loewen (Ind.); 1,366; 2.74%	Ted Falk
Selkirk—Interlake—Eastman	Detlev Regelsky; 6,567; 13.24%	James Bezan; 28,308; 57.06%	Margaret Smith; 9,604; 19.36%	Wayne James; 1,328; 2.68%	Ian Kathwaroon; 3,800; 7.66%		James Bezan

=== 2019 ===
Electoral district	Candidates							Incumbent
Electoral district	Liberal	Conservative	NDP	Green	PPC	Christian Heritage	Independent	Incumbent
Brandon—Souris	Terry Hayward; 4,972; 12.07%	Larry Maguire; 26,148; 63.46%	Ashley Duguay; 5,805; 14.09%	Bill Tiessen; 2,984; 7.24%	Robin Lussier; 691; 1.68%	Rebecca Hein; 280; 0.68%	Robert Eastcott; 107 0.26%	Larry Maguire
Brandon—Souris	Terry Hayward; 4,972; 12.07%	Larry Maguire; 26,148; 63.46%	Ashley Duguay; 5,805; 14.09%	Bill Tiessen; 2,984; 7.24%	Robin Lussier; 691; 1.68%	Rebecca Hein; 280; 0.68%	Vanessa Hamilton; 219 0.53%	Larry Maguire
Churchill—Keewatinook Aski	Judy Klassen; 5,616; 23.71%	Cyara Bird; 4,714; 19.90%	Niki Ashton; 11,919; 50.32%	Ralph McLean; 1,144; 4.83%	Ken Klyne; 294; 1.24%			Niki Ashton
Dauphin—Swan River—Neepawa	Cathy Scofield-Singh; 5,344; 13.17%	Dan Mazier; 26,103; 64.35%	Laverne Lewycky; 5,724; 14.11%	Kate Storey; 2,214; 5.46%	Frank Godon; 711; 1.75%	Jenni Johnson; 470; 1.16%		Robert Sopuck†
Portage—Lisgar	Ken Werbiski; 4,779; 10.71%	Candice Bergen; 31,600; 70.79%	Cindy Friesen; 3,872; 8.67%	Beverley Eert; 2,356; 5.28%	Aaron Archer; 1,169; 2.62%	Jerome Dondo; 860; 1.93%		Candice Bergen
Provencher	Trevor Kirczenow; 6,347; 13.14%	Ted Falk; 31,821; 65.88%	Erin McGee; 6,187; 12.81%	Janine G. Gibson; 2,884; 5.97%	Wayne Sturby; 1,066; 2.21%			Ted Falk
Selkirk—Interlake—Eastman	Detlev Regelsky; 6,003; 12.10%	James Bezan; 31,109; 62.72%	Robert A. Smith; 8,873; 17.89%	Wayne James; 2,934; 5.92%	Ian Kathwaroon; 683; 1.38%			James Bezan

=== 2015 ===
Electoral district	Candidates					Incumbent
Electoral district	Conservative	NDP	Liberal	Green	Other	Incumbent
Brandon—Souris	Larry Maguire; 20,666; 50.27%	Melissa Joy Wastasecoot; 2,576; 6.27%	Jodi Wyman; 15,338; 37.31%	David Neufeld; 2,526; 6.15%		Larry Maguire
Churchill—Keewatinook Aski	Kyle G. Mirecki; 3,090; 10.32%	Niki Ashton; 13,487; 45.04%	Rebecca Chartrand; 12,575; 42.00%	August Hastmann; 537; 1.79%	Zachary Linnick (Libert.); 255; 0.85%	Niki Ashton; Churchill
Dauphin—Swan River— Neepawa	Robert Sopuck; 19,276; 46.34%	Laverne M. Lewycky; 5,097; 12.25%	Ray Piché; 12,276; 29.51%	Kate Storey; 1,592; 3.83%	Inky Mark (Ind.); 3,357; 8.07%	Robert Sopuck; Dauphin—Swan River—Marquette
Portage—Lisgar	Candice Bergen; 25,060; 60.84%	Dean Harder; 2,554; 6.20%	Ken Werbiski; 10,621; 25.79%	Beverley Eert; 1,637; 3.97%	Jerome Dondo (CHP); 1,315; 3.19%	Candice Bergen
Provencher	Ted Falk; 25,086; 56.06%	Les Lilley; 2,371; 5.30%	Terry Hayward; 15,509; 34.66%	Jeff Wheeldon; 1,779; 3.98%		Ted Falk
Selkirk—Interlake— Eastman	James Bezan; 25,617; 51.90%	Deborah Chief; 5,649; 11.44%	Joanne Levy; 15,508; 31.42%	Wayne James; 1,707; 3.46%	Donald L. Grant (Libert.); 882; 1.79%	James Bezan; Selkirk—Interlake

=== 2011 ===
Electoral district	Candidates					Incumbent
Electoral district	Conservative	Liberal	NDP	Green	Other	Incumbent
Brandon—Souris	Merv Tweed; 22,386; 63.73%	Wes Penner; 1,882; 5.36%	John Bouché; 8,845; 25.18%	Dave Barnes; 2,012; 5.73%		Merv Tweed
Churchill	Wally Daudrich; 5,256; 26.18%	Sydney Garrioch; 4,087; 20.36%	Niki Ashton; 10,262; 51.12%	Alberteen Spence; 471; 2.35%		Niki Ashton
Dauphin—Swan River— Marquette	Robert Sopuck; 18,543; 63.09%	Wendy Menzies; 1,947; 6.62%	Cheryl Osborne; 7,657; 26.05%	Kate Storey; 1,243; 4.23%		Robert Sopuck
Portage—Lisgar	Candice Hoeppner; 26,899; 75.99%	M.J. Willard; 2,221; 6.27%	Mohamed Alli; 3,478; 9.83%	Matthew Friesen; 1,996; 5.64%	Jerome Dondo (CHP); 805; 2.27%	Candice Hoeppner
Provencher	Vic Toews; 27,820; 70.60%	Terry Hayward; 2,645; 6.71%	Al Mackling; 7,051; 17.89%	Janine Gibson; 1,164; 2.95%	Ric Lim (Pirate); 215 0.55%	Vic Toews
Provencher	Vic Toews; 27,820; 70.60%	Terry Hayward; 2,645; 6.71%	Al Mackling; 7,051; 17.89%	Janine Gibson; 1,164; 2.95%	David Reimer (CHP); 510 1.29%	Vic Toews
Selkirk—Interlake	James Bezan; 26,848; 65.19%	Duncan Geisler; 1,980; 4.81%	Sean Palsson; 10,933; 26.55%	Don Winstone; 1,423; 3.46%		James Bezan

=== 2008 ===
Electoral district	Candidates						Incumbent
Electoral district	Conservative	Liberal	NDP	Green	Christian Heritage	Other	Incumbent
Brandon—Souris	Merv Tweed; 19,558; 57.06%	Martha Jo Willard; 2,836; 8.27%	John Bouché; 6,055; 17.67%	Dave Barnes; 5,410; 15.78%	Jerome Dondo; 292; 0.85%	Lisa Gallagher (Comm.); 124; 0.36%	Merv Tweed
Churchill	Wally Daudrich; 3,773; 20.50%	Tina Keeper; 5,289; 28.74%	Niki Ashton; 8,734; 47.46%	Saara Harvie; 606; 3.29%			Tina Keeper
Dauphin— Swan River— Marquette	Inky Mark; 18,132; 61.36%	Wendy Menzies; 4,128; 13.97%	Ron Strynadka; 4,914; 16.63%	Kate Storey; 1,923; 6.51%	David Andres; 356; 1.20%	Charles Prefontaine (PPP); 96; 0.32%	Inky Mark
Portage—Lisgar	Candice Hoeppner; 22,036; 68.27%	Ted Klassen; 4,374; 13.55%	Mohamed Alli; 2,353; 7.29%	Charlie Howatt; 2,606; 8.07%	Len Lodder; 911; 2.82%		Brian Pallister†
Provencher	Vic Toews; 23,303; 64.66%	Shirley Hiebert; 4,531; 12.57%	Ross Martin; 4,947; 13.73%	Janine Gibson; 2,089; 5.80%	David Reimer; 1,170; 3.25%		Vic Toews
Selkirk—Interlake	James Bezan; 23,302; 60.63%	Kevin Walsh; 3,203; 8.33%	Pat Cordner; 9,506; 24.73%	Glenda Whiteman; 2,126; 5.53%	Jane MacDiarmid; 295; 0.77%		James Bezan

=== 2006 ===
Electoral district	Candidates						Incumbent
Electoral district	Liberal	Conservative	NDP	Green	Christian Heritage	Other	Incumbent
Brandon—Souris	Murray Downing; 6,696; 18.00%	Merv Tweed; 20,247; 54.43%	Bob Senff; 7,528; 20.24%	Brad Bird; 1,707; 4.59%	Colin Atkins; 290; 0.78%	Lisa Gallagher (Comm.); 120 0.32%	Merv Tweed
Brandon—Souris	Murray Downing; 6,696; 18.00%	Merv Tweed; 20,247; 54.43%	Bob Senff; 7,528; 20.24%	Brad Bird; 1,707; 4.59%	Colin Atkins; 290; 0.78%	Mike Volek (Ind.); 611 1.64%	Merv Tweed
Churchill	Tina Keeper; 10,157; 40.68%	Nazir Ahmad; 2,886; 11.56%	Niki Christina Ashton; 7,093; 28.41%	Jeff Fountain; 401; 1.61%		Brad Bodnar (Ind.); 146 0.58%	Bev Desjarlais
Churchill	Tina Keeper; 10,157; 40.68%	Nazir Ahmad; 2,886; 11.56%	Niki Christina Ashton; 7,093; 28.41%	Jeff Fountain; 401; 1.61%		Bev Desjarlais (Ind.); 4,283 17.16%	Bev Desjarlais
Dauphin—Swan River—Marquette	Don Dewar; 6,171; 18.15%	Inky Mark; 20,084; 59.08%	Walter Kolisnyk; 6,221; 18.30%	Kathy Storey; 1,246; 3.67%	Iris Yawney; 273; 0.80%		Inky Mark; Dauphin—Swan River
Portage—Lisgar	Garry McLean; 4,199; 11.39%	Brian Pallister; 25,719; 69.78%	Daren Van Den Bussche; 4,072; 11.05%	Charlie Howatt; 1,880; 5.10%	David Reimer; 987; 2.68%		Brian Pallister
Provencher	Wes Penner; 6,077; 15.84%	Vic Toews; 25,199; 65.68%	Patrick O'Connor; 5,259; 13.71%	Janine G. Gibson; 1,830; 4.77%			Vic Toews
Selkirk—Interlake	Bruce Benson; 4,436; 10.03%	James Bezan; 21,661; 48.99%	Ed Schreyer; 16,358; 36.99%	Thomas Alexander Goodman; 1,283; 2.90%	Anthony Eric Barendregt; 204; 0.46%	Duncan E. Geisler (Ind.); 277; 0.63%	James Bezan

=== 2004 ===
Electoral district	Candidates						Incumbent
Electoral district	Liberal	Conservative	NDP	Green	Christian Heritage	Communist	Incumbent
Brandon—Souris	Murray Downing; 8,522; 24.21%	Merv Tweed; 18,209; 51.72%	Mike Abbey; 6,740; 19.15%	David Kattenburg; 1,264; 3.59%	Colin Atkins; 351; 1.00%	Lisa Gallagher; 118; 0.34%	Rick Borotsik†
Churchill	Ron Evans; 7,604; 38.35%	Bill Archer; 2,999; 15.13%	Bev Desjarlais; 8,612; 43.44%	C. David Nickarz; 612; 3.09%			Bev Desjarlais
Dauphin—Swan River	Don Dewar; 6,809; 20.38%	Inky Mark; 18,025; 53.95%	Walter Kolisnyk; 7,341; 21.97%	Lindy Clubb; 673; 2.01%	David C. Andres; 560; 1.68%		Inky Mark
Portage—Lisgar	Don Kuhl; 6,174; 17.74%	Brian Pallister; 22,939; 65.93%	Daren Van Den Bussche; 3,251; 9.34%	Marc Payette; 856; 2.46%	David Reimer; 1,458; 4.19%	Allister Cucksey; 117; 0.34%	Brian Pallister
Provencher	Peter Epp; 8,975; 24.92%	Vic Toews; 22,694; 63.02%	Sarah Zaharia; 3,244; 9.01%	Janine G. Gibson; 1,100; 3.05%			Vic Toews
Selkirk—Interlake	Bruce Benson; 9,059; 22.85%	James Bezan; 18,727; 47.25%	Duane Nicol; 10,516; 26.53%	Trevor Farley; 982; 2.48%	Anthony Barendregt; 353; 0.89%		Howard Hilstrom†

=== 2000 ===
Electoral district	Candidates					Incumbent
Electoral district	Liberal	Canadian Alliance	NDP	PC	Other	Incumbent
Brandon—Souris	Dick Scott; 6,544; 17.86%	Gary Nestibo; 11,678; 31.87%	Errol Black; 4,518; 12.33%	Rick Borotsik; 13,707; 37.41%	Colin G. Atkins (NA); 94 0.26%	Rick Borotsik
Brandon—Souris	Dick Scott; 6,544; 17.86%	Gary Nestibo; 11,678; 31.87%	Errol Black; 4,518; 12.33%	Rick Borotsik; 13,707; 37.41%	Lisa Gallagher (Comm.); 102 0.28%	Rick Borotsik
Churchill	Elijah Harper; 7,514; 32.23%	Jason Shaw; 4,126; 17.70%	Bev Desjarlais; 10,477; 44.94%	Doreen Murray; 1,198; 5.14%		Bev Desjarlais
Dauphin—Swan River	Jane Dawson; 7,091; 21.32%	Inky Mark; 15,855; 47.66%	Wayne Kines; 5,813; 17.47%	Keith Eliasson; 3,946; 11.86%	Terry Drul (CAP); 372 1.12%	Inky Mark
Dauphin—Swan River	Jane Dawson; 7,091; 21.32%	Inky Mark; 15,855; 47.66%	Wayne Kines; 5,813; 17.47%	Keith Eliasson; 3,946; 11.86%	Iris Yawney (NA); 189 0.57%	Inky Mark
Portage—Lisgar	Gerry J.E. Gebler; 6,133; 17.82%	Brian Pallister; 17,318; 50.31%	Diane Beresford; 2,073; 6.02%	Morley McDonald; 5,339; 15.51%	Jake Hoeppner (Ind.); 3,558; 10.34%	Jake Hoeppner (Note: Elected as a Reform MP in 1997, was excluded from the Reform caucus in July 1999.)
Provencher	David Iftody; 14,419; 35.62%	Vic Toews; 21,358; 52.76%	Peter Hiebert; 1,980; 4.89%	Henry C. Dyck; 2,726; 6.73%		David Iftody
Selkirk—Interlake	Kathy Arnason; 9,612; 23.59%	Howard Hilstrom; 17,856; 43.82%	Paul Pododworny; 8,113; 19.91%	Tom Goodman; 4,992; 12.25%	Anthony Barendregt (NA); 178; 0.44%	Howard Hilstrom

=== 1997 ===
Electoral district	Candidates					Incumbent
Electoral district	Liberal	Reform	PC	NDP	Other	Incumbent
Brandon—Souris	Glen McKinnon; 6,583	Ed Agnew; 11,883	Rick Borotsik; 13,216	Jennifer Howard; 4,983	473	Glen McKinnon
Churchill	Elijah Harper; 6,852	Corky Peterson; 4,438	Don Knight; 2,452	Bev Desjarlais; 9,616		Elijah Harper
Dauphin—Swan River	Marlene Cowling; 7,408	Inky Mark; 12,668	Lorne Boguski; 7,716	Betty Findlay; 7,575	326	Marlene Cowling
Portage—Lisgar	Heather Mack; 4,913	Jake Hoeppner; 13,532	Brian Pallister; 12,083	Glen Hallick; 2,420	676	Jake Hoeppner; Lisgar—Marquette
Provencher	David Iftody; 14,595	Larry Tardiff; 12,798	Clare Braun; 5,955	Martha Wiebe Owen; 3,137		David Iftody
Selkirk—Interlake	Jon Gerrard; 10,871	Howard Hilstrom; 10,937	Reid Kelner; 5,730	Kathleen Mccallum; 10,749	363	Jon Gerrard; Portage—Interlake
Selkirk—Interlake	Jon Gerrard; 10,871	Howard Hilstrom; 10,937	Reid Kelner; 5,730	Kathleen Mccallum; 10,749	363	merged districts
Selkirk—Interlake	Jon Gerrard; 10,871	Howard Hilstrom; 10,937	Reid Kelner; 5,730	Kathleen Mccallum; 10,749	363	Ron Fewchuk; Selkirk—Red River

=== 1993 ===
Electoral district	Candidates					Incumbent
Electoral district	Liberal	Reform	PC	NDP	Other	Incumbent
Brandon—Souris	Glen McKinnon; 12,130	Edward George Agnew; 11,163	Larry Maguire; 8,236	Ross C. Martin; 4,359	869	Lee Clark
Churchill	Elijah Harper; 9,658	Wally Daudrich; 2,275	Don Knight; 2,438	Rod Murphy; 8,751	590	Rod Murphy
Dauphin—Swan River	Marlene Cowling; 10,600	Dale Brown; 9,865	Bill Galloway; 5,267	Stan Struthers; 7,412	260	Brian White
Lisgar—Marquette	Grant Johnson; 8,732	Jake Hoeppner; 13,385	Charlie Mayer; 7,833	Leslie King; 1,808	869	Charlie Mayer
Portage—Interlake	Jon Gerrard; 14,506	Don Sawatsky; 9,801	Felix Holtmann; 7,036	Connie Gretsinger; 3,029	1,289	Felix Holtmann
Provencher	David Iftody; 16,119	Dean Whiteway; 13,463	Kelly Clark; 3,765	Martha Wiebe Owen; 1,818	1,438	Jake Epp
Selkirk—Red River	Ron Fewchuk; 16,003	Terry Lewis; 12,412	David Bjornson; 5,687	Jason E. Schreyer; 12,515	2,060	David Bjornson
