= New Democratic Party candidates in the 1993 Canadian federal election =

The New Democratic Party of Canada ran a full slate of candidates in the 1993 federal election, and won nine seats out of 295. This brought the NDP below official party status in the House of Commons of Canada for the first, and, to date, only time in its history.

Many of the party's candidates have their own biography pages; information about others may be found here.

== Quebec ==
=== Jonquière: Karl Bélanger ===
Karl Bélanger (born 1975) is the Senior press secretary for Canada's New Democratic Party leader Jack Layton. He used to be the spokesman for former NDP Leader Alexa McDonough and has worked for the party since the 1997 federal election. Bélanger is a native of Quebec City, and noted for his fondness for team sports.

He was a candidate in the 1993 federal election in the riding of Jonquière, and in the 1996 federal by-election in Lac-Saint-Jean. He was President of the New Democratic Youth of Québec from 1994 to 1998 and Vice-President of the New Democratic Youth of Canada from 1995 to 1997.

As a party spokesperson, he appears regularly on CPAC's political panels and on CTV's Mike Duffy Live, and is a regular columnist in The Hill Times. He is also a regular guest on radio stations such as CJAD, CFRA and the New 940 Montreal.

He earned a B.A. in political science from Université Laval in Quebec City in 1997. He previously had received a college degree in arts and media technology at the Jonquière CEGEP in 1995.

On January 21, 2007, Alan Kellogg of the Edmonton Journal called Bélanger "a Great Canadian" for his longtime work as assistant to the NDP leader.

Bélanger has been the second baseman for the Ottawa Citizen Gargoyles in the Ottawa Conventional Softball League since 1999. He holds a career team record for being hit by a pitch.

- Profil de Karl Bélanger, président des jeunes néo-démocrates du Québec
- Karl Belanger on the campaign trail with David Akin

=== Richelieu: Carl Ethier ===
Carl Ethier identified as a psychotherapist. He received 337 votes (0.71%), finishing fourth against Bloc Québécois incumbent Louis Plamondon.

== Ontario ==
=== Eglinton—Lawrence: Gael Hepworth ===
Hepworth was financial director of the Ontario Coalition for Better Child Care, advocating for increased day care spending in Ontario. She campaigned on improving Canada's worker training and adjustment programs. Following the NDP's defeat in the election, Hepworth commented that the party had "lost touch with its traditions as a social movement" and faced "a painful re-orientation". She later ran for a school trustee position in York, but was unsuccessful. She was a member of the City of York Community and Agency Social Planning Council in 1996.

Electoral record
Election	Division	Party	Votes	%	Place	Winner
1993 federal	Eglinton—Lawrence	NDP	2,091	5.23	4/7	Joe Volpe, Liberal
1994 municipal	York School Trustee, Ward Two	n/a	508		3/5	Pete Karageorgos

=== Kingston and the Islands: Mary Ann Higgs ===
Higgs is a lawyer and veteran community activist. Born in Kent County, Ontario, she moved to Kingston in 1968 to attend Queen's University. She graduated from Queen's in 1970, and received a further degree from the University of Western Ontario in 1975. After graduation, she worked as a librarian at the Prison for Women and the National Defence College, and was the owner-operator of Bread Man of Kingston and the Miss Kingston Delicatessen (Kingston Whig-Standard, 10 October 1992). She returned to Queen's to study law in 1982, and began a private practice after being called to the Ontario Bar in 1987, specializing in family real estate, small business, non-profit corporations, women's issues, and human rights law (KWS, 1 December 1992).

She was a member of the pro-choice Canadian Abortion Rights Action League (CARAL) in the 1980s, and was a spokesperson for the group in Kingston (KWS, 7 June 1985). She has also been a board member of organizations such as the Elizabeth Fry Society and the Kingston General Hospital, and has served as president of the Kingston Unitarian Fellowship (KWS, 28 June 1985 and 1 December 1992). Higgs is currently a director of The Community Foundation of Greater Kingston.

Higgs won the NDP nomination in 1992 over school board trustee Lars Thompson (KWS, 1 December 1992). She received 4,051 votes (7.06%) in the 1993 election, finishing fourth against Liberal incumbent Peter Milliken. In 1995, she supported Svend Robinson's bid to lead the NDP (KWS, 16 October 1995).

=== Ottawa—Vanier: Willie Dunn ===
Dunn received 3,155 votes (6.50%), finishing fourth against Liberal incumbent Jean-Robert Gauthier.

=== Parry Sound-Muskoka: Shirley Davy ===
Shirley Davy identified as a sales broker in 1993. She received 2,164 votes (4.68%), finishing fourth against Liberal candidate Andy Mitchell. She opposed efforts to privatize TV Ontario in 1995, arguing that the station provides an essential educational and cultural services to remote areas of Ontario.

Davy left the New Democratic Party to run the Green Party's local campaign in 1997. She later joined the Progressive Conservative Party of Canada to support David Orchard's candidacy for the party leadership.

=== St. Catharines: Jane Hughes ===
Hughes was a teacher in St. Catharines at the time of election. A veteran activist, she wrote against American arms sales to El Salvador, Chile and South Africa in 1989 (Globe and Mail, 1 June 1989), and opposed Brian Mulroney's approach to promoting the Charlottetown Accord in 1992 (Globe and Mail, 5 September 1992).

She received 2,799 votes (5.73%), finishing fourth against Liberal Walt Lastewka.

Hughes campaigned for a seat on the Niagara Regional Council in 1994. She lost by eighteen votes on election night, but an electronic recount later showed her to have won by twenty-two and a subsequent manual recount gave her a further eleven votes (Toronto Star, 15 February 1995). She was re-elected in 1997, and appears to have served until 2000.

=== Scarborough West: Steve Thomas ===
Thomas has been a prominent fundraiser for many years, both for the New Democratic Party and for independent progressive organizations. He began his fundraising career at Oxfam Canada in 1973, and later worked for clients such as Amnesty International, Greenpeace, the Multiple Sclerosis (MS) Society, the Schizophrenia Society, Scouts Canada, the St. Boniface Hospital and Sunnybrook Hospital. As of 1993, he had raised $60 million in his cumulative efforts for non-profit organizations. Thomas was also Director of Development at Humber College from 1975 to 1977.

Thomas campaigned for the New Democratic Party of Ontario in the 1977 provincial election, and received 8,125 votes in Don Mills for a second-place finish against Progressive Conservative incumbent Dennis Timbrell.

Thomas made abortion access a leading feature of his 1993 campaign, describing Liberal incumbent Tom Wappel as "the most notorious vehement anti-choice member in the federal house today" (Toronto Star, 13 May 1993). He also focused on job creation, and he promised to work to revoke the country's new drug patent law (Toronto Star, 22 October 1993). At one all-candidates meeting, Thomas defended Canada's immigration levels against calls from a Reform Party candidate that they be cut in half (Toronto Star, 19 October 1993). He received 2,771 votes (7.07%), finishing fourth against Wappel.

Thomas was named as Outstanding Fundraising Executive of the Year in 2002 , and has been described by some as the "guru" and "godfather" of Canadian direct response fundraising. As of 2005, he sits on the board of Resource Alliance.

=== St. Paul's: David Jacobs ===
Jacobs received 2,641 votes (5.16%), finishing fourth against Liberal candidate Barry Campbell.

=== Sudbury: Rosemarie Blenkinsop ===
Rosemarie Blenkinsop was a member of the Canada Committee in 1992, supporting a "Yes" vote in the Charlottetown Accord referendum. She received 3,675 votes (8.69%), finishing fourth against Liberal incumbent Diane Marleau.

== Manitoba ==
=== Ross C. Martin (Brandon—Souris) ===
Martin was a Manitoba Hydro worker and labour activist in Brandon, Manitoba. He was a member of city council from 1980 to 1998, representing the Riverview district, and was president of the Brandon Trades and Labour Council from 1979 to 1998. In 1996, he led protests in Brandon against the provincial government's Bill 26, which limited the ability of unions to organize and negotiate. When he retired from council in 1998, he was the longest-serving councillor in the city's history.

Martin received 4,359 votes (11.86%) in 1993, finishing fourth against Liberal candidate Glen McKinnon. He sought the provincial New Democratic Party nomination for Brandon East in the 1999 provincial election, but lost to Drew Caldwell. He later became a representative for the Manitoba Hydro Workers Union, and encouraged the provincial government to pass anti-scab legislation. As of 2006, Martin serves on the Manitoba Municipal Board.

In 2008, he retired as an engineering design co-ordinator. He is the NDP's candidate in the 2008 Canadian federal election in the riding of Provencher.

=== Jason Schreyer (Selkirk—Red River) ===
Jason Schreyer (born 1967) is the son of Edward Schreyer, who served as Premier of Manitoba from 1969 to 1977 and as Governor General of Canada from 1979 to 1984. His maternal grandfather, Jake Schultz, was also a Member of Parliament.

Schreyer attended the University of Manitoba. He considered running for the New Democratic Party of Manitoba in the River East division in the 1988 provincial election, but decided that his age disqualified him as a serious candidate.

Schreyer defeated Colleen Allen and Robert de Groot to win the federal party's nomination in 1993. His candidacy received national attention because of his family connections. Schreyer was frequently compared to his father on the campaign trail, and was considered a serious challenger for the riding. He was unable to fend off a national trend against the New Democratic Party, however, and finished second against Liberal Ron Fewchuk. He later formed an investment group.

=== Rose Buss (Winnipeg South) ===
Buss was an organizer for the New Democratic Party, and was thirty-three years old at the time of the election (Winnipeg Free Press, 29 September 1993). She was the only candidate for the NDP nomination in Winnipeg South, although her nomination was delayed because of a party policy requiring that efforts be made to find candidates from visible minority groups. Despite the inconvenience to herself, she continued to endorse the party's affirmative action program (Winnipeg Free Press, 22 September 1993). One report from the national press indicates that Buss was herself aboriginal (Globe and Mail, 12 October 1993).

She received 2,180 votes (4.17%), finishing fourth against Liberal candidate Reg Alcock.

== Alberta ==
=== Catherine Rose (Calgary Southwest) ===
Rose has a Master of Science degree in physical and analytical chemistry, and began working in the field of toxic waste management in 1988. In 1989, she was project coordinator for the Alberta Toxic Round-up, which categorized items to be sent to the Swan Hills hazardous waste treatment plant.

She had previously campaigned for the New Democratic Party of Alberta in the 1993 provincial election. Rose was thirty-eight years old in 1993.

Electoral record
Election	Division	Party	Votes	%	Place	Winner
1993 provincial	Calgary Lougheed	NDP	502		3/5	Jim Dinning, Progressive Conservative
1993 federal	Calgary Southwest	NDP	1,099	1.62	4/9	Preston Manning, Reform
