= Ross Martin (disambiguation) =

Ross Martin (1920–1981) was a Polish American actor.

Ross Martin can also refer to:

- Ross Martin (skier) (1943–2011), Australian skier
- Ross C. Martin, Canadian labour activist, unsuccessful candidate in federal election in 1993 and 2008 in Manitoba
- Ross Martin, guitar and keyboard player in British pop rock band Absent Elk
- Ross Martin, Scottish guitarist with folk group Dàimh
- Ross Martin (American football) (born 1994), American football player

== See also ==
- Brian Ross Martin (born 1947), Australian jurist
- Harold Ross Eycott-Martin (1897–unknown), British pilot of World War I
- Ross Gilmore Marvin (1880–1909), American Arctic explorer
