= Hilstrom =

Hilstrom is a surname. Notable people with the surname include:

- Debra Hilstrom (born 1968), American politician
- Howard Hilstrom (born 1947), Canadian politician, rancher, and police officer
