= Robert Cruise =

Canadian politician

Member of the Canadian Parliament for Dauphin
- In office 1911–1921
- Preceded by: Glenlyon Campbell
- Succeeded by: William John Ward

Personal details
- Born: 11 December 1868 Lachute, Quebec
- Died: 19 June 1932 (aged 63) Dauphin, Manitoba
- Party: Liberal, Liberal Unionist

Robert Cruise (11 December 1868 – 19 June 1932) was a Canadian Member of Parliament for Dauphin, Manitoba.

Born in Lachute, Quebec, the son of Peter and Margaret (Mill) Cruise, he was a farmer in Quebec until 1893 when he moved to Manitoba settling in Dauphin where he acquired a farm of 160 acres (0.65 km^{2}). He later sold this land and purchased 1,600 acres (6.5 km^{2}) of land.

Cruise was elected as a Liberal in the 1911 federal election, however, as a result of the Conscription Crisis of 1917 he and many other English-Canadian Liberals crossed the floor to support the Union government formed by Robert Borden in 1917. The Conscription question split the Liberal party with loyalists to party leader Sir Wilfrid Laurier styling themselves Laurier Liberals and supporters of the Borden government calling themselves Liberal Unionists.

Cruise stood for re-election in the 1917 election and was acclaimed as a Government supporter. He sat in parliament as a Unionist (Conservative and Liberal). He did not return to the Liberal Party following World War I but ran for re-election in 1921 as a Conservative (technically, the Tories ran in this election as the National Liberal and Conservative Party in an unsuccessful attempt to retain the support of Liberals who had defected from the party during the war.) Cruise was soundly defeated by William John Ward, a candidate for the new Progressive Party of Canada.
