= William John Ward =

Canadian politician

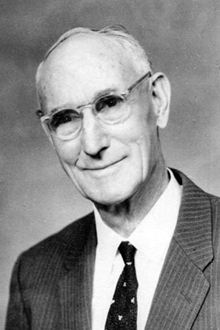

Member of the Canadian Parliament for Dauphin
- In office 1921–1930
- Preceded by: Robert Cruise
- Succeeded by: James Langstaff Bowman
- In office 1935–1945
- Preceded by: James Langstaff Bowman
- Succeeded by: Fred Zaplitny
- In office 1949–1953
- Preceded by: Fred Zaplitny
- Succeeded by: Fred Zaplitny

Personal details
- Born: October 25, 1880 near Owen Sound, Ontario
- Died: August 18, 1971 (aged 90) Dauphin, Manitoba
- Party: Progressive Party of Canada; Liberal Progressive; Liberal; Independent Liberal

William John Ward (born October 25, 1880) was a Canadian politician, farmer, insurance, and real estate agent. A member of the Ginger Group, he represented the Dauphin electoral district in the House of Commons of Canada from 1921–1930, 1935–1945, and 1949–1953.

He was a member of a group which advocated for the establishment of Riding Mountain National Park in western Manitoba.

== Early life and education ==
William John Ward was born in October 25, 1880, near Owen Sound, Ontario.

He was the seventh of ten children of Charles Christopher Ward and Janet Mitchell. After attending school in Williamsford, he moved to Dauphin with his widowed mother.

== Career ==
In Manitoba, Ward worked as a farmer, insurance and real estate agent. He later served as the managing president of the United Farmers of Manitoba (1931-1932) and as the president of Adanac Whale and Fish Products Limited in Churchill.

== Politics ==
In 1921, he was elected to the House of Commons of Canada for Dauphin, and was re-elected in 1925–1926.

As a member of the Ginger Group, he joined the Progressive Party of Canada.

During his initial parliamentary tenure (1921–1930), Ward advocated for separating the commemoration of World War I from Thanksgiving Day. Following his defeat by James Langstaff Bowman in the 1930 federal election, MP Alan Webster Neill introduced the 1931 legislation that formally renamed the holiday to Remembrance Day and fixed its observance strictly on November 11.

In 1926, he became a Liberal Progressive up until 1935, when he transitioned into a Liberal.

He was re-elected in 1935 and 1940. In 1945, he was defeated by Fred Zaplitny.

He was re-elected in 1949, but did not seek election in 1953. He was defeated in the 1957 election by Fred Zaplitny.

== Personal life ==
On December 15, 1909, Ward married Annie Helen Fisher (1890–1953) in Dauphin, Manitoba.

On August 16, 1971, Ward died, and was buried in Riverside Cemetery.

== Legacy ==
Ward was commemorated by he community of Ward.
