= Fred Zaplitny =

Canadian politician

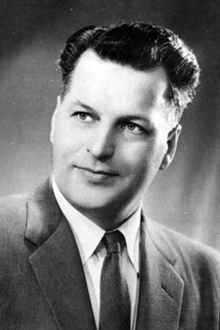

Member of the Canadian Parliament for Dauphin
- In office 1945–1949
- Preceded by: William John Ward
- Succeeded by: William John Ward
- In office 1953–1958
- Preceded by: William John Ward
- Succeeded by: Elmer Forbes

Personal details
- Born: June 9, 1913 Oak Brae, Manitoba, Canada
- Died: March 19, 1964 (aged 50) Dauphin, Manitoba, Canada
- Party: Cooperative Commonwealth Federation
- Occupation: insurance broker

Frederick Samuel (Fred) Zaplitny (June 9, 1913 – March 19, 1964) was a Canadian politician. He represented the electoral district of Dauphin in the House of Commons of Canada from 1945 to 1949, and from 1953 to 1958. He was a member of the Cooperative Commonwealth Federation.

Zaplitny also sought election to the Legislative Assembly of Manitoba in the provincial elections of 1936, 1941 and 1949, but was never successful in being elected to the provincial legislature. Zaplitny was of Ukrainian descent.
