= Marlene Cowling =

Canadian politician

Member of Parliament for Dauphin—Swan River
- In office 1993–1997
- Preceded by: Brian White
- Succeeded by: Inky Mark

Personal details
- Born: 26 August 1941 (age 84) Dauphin, Manitoba
- Party: Liberal
- Profession: farmer

Marlene Cowling (born 26 August 1941 in Dauphin, Manitoba) was a member of the House of Commons of Canada from 1993 to 1997 in the Dauphin—Swan River electoral district. By career, she is a farmer.

Cowling was elected as a Liberal Member of Parliament in the 1993 federal election. She was defeated by Inky Mark of the Reform Party in the 1997 election.

== Electoral record ==
1997 Canadian federal election
Party	Candidate	Votes	%	±%	Expenditures
Reform	Inky Mark	12,668	35.49	+5.96	$32,650
Progressive Conservative	Lorne Boguski	7,716	21.62	+5.85	$50,353
New Democratic	Betty Findlay	7,575	21.22	-0.97	$48,818
Liberal	Marlene Cowling	7,408	20.75	-10.98	$44,417
Independent	Tony Riley	326	0.91	+0.13	$2,130
Total valid votes		35,693	100.00		
Total rejected ballots		122	0.34	–	
Turnout		35,815	65.4	–	
Reform gain from Liberal		Swing		-8.5	

1993 Canadian federal election
Party	Candidate	Votes	%	±%
Liberal	Marlene Cowling	10,600	31.73	+12.10
Reform	Dale Brown	9,865	29.53	+26.13
New Democratic	Stan Struthers	7,412	22.19	-11.20
Progressive Conservative	Bill Galloway	5,267	15.77	-25.60
Canada Party	Tony Riley	260	0.78	
Total valid votes		33,404	100.00	
Liberal gain from Progressive Conservative		Swing	-18.85	
