= James Langstaff Bowman =

Canadian politician (1879–1951)

The Honourable James Langstaff Bowman PC

18th Speaker of the House of Commons of Canada
- In office January 17, 1935 – February 5, 1936
- Preceded by: George Black
- Succeeded by: Pierre-François Casgrain

Member of the Canadian Parliament for Dauphin
- In office 1930–1935
- Preceded by: William John Ward
- Succeeded by: William John Ward

Personal details
- Born: October 6, 1879 Thornhill, Ontario
- Died: September 14, 1951 (aged 71) Dauphin, Manitoba
- Party: Conservative

Olympic medal record

Men's Curling
| Gold medal – first place | 1932 Lake Placid | Curling (demonstration) |

James Langstaff Bowman, PC (October 6, 1879 – September 14, 1951) was the first Speaker of the House of Commons of Canada from Manitoba.

== Biography ==
Bowman had been a teacher and lawyer in Dauphin, Manitoba. In 1917, he became the town's mayor. He ran unsuccessfully in the 1925 and 1926 general elections for the Conservative Party. He finally winning a seat in the 1930 election that brought R.B. Bennett to power.

He became Speaker after his predecessor, George Black, suffered a nervous breakdown in the summer of 1934, and was unfit to preside when the House of Commons of Canada reconvened in January 1935.

As the Deputy Speaker was ill, Bennett approached Bowman, a backbencher, hours before the House was to convene, about becoming Speaker for the rest of the Parliamentary term.

Bowman had little experience as Speaker and had to deal with a tense, pre-election session. Members of Parliament on all sides of the House felt that Bowman did well in the job. But when the 1935 general election was held in the fall, Bowman lost his seat by a large margin.

He returned to his law practice in Dauphin and failed in his attempt to regain his seat in the 1940 election.

James Bowman was named to the team that represented the Manitoba Curling Association at the 1932 Winter Olympics. That year, curling was a demonstration sport. Bowman was third for the team which took first place in the event. The Manitoba team was undefeated, winning all four of its games at the Olympics. In 2004, the team was inducted into the Manitoba Sports Hall of Fame.
