= Glenlyon Campbell =

Canadian politician (1863–1917)

Lieutenant-Colonel Glenlyon Campbell

Member of the Canadian Parliament for Dauphin
- In office 1908–1911
- Preceded by: Theodore Arthur Burrows
- Succeeded by: Robert Cruise

Personal details
- Born: October 3, 1863 Fort Pelly, British North America
- Died: October 20, 1917 (aged 54) France
- Party: Conservative Party of Canada

Glenlyon Archibald Campbell (October 3, 1863 – October 20, 1917) was a politician in Manitoba, Canada. He served in the Legislative Assembly of Manitoba from 1903 to 1908, and in the House of Commons of Canada from 1908 to 1911. Campbell was a member of the Conservative Party of Canada.

Campbell was born at Fort Pelly, in what was then known as the Northwest Territories. His father, Robert Campbell, was a Scotsman who served as Chief Factor for the Hudson's Bay Company, the dominant power in the region. The younger Campbell was educated at Glasgow Academy and the Merchiston Castle School in Edinburgh, and worked as a farmer and rancher upon returning to Canada. He helped to establish the community of Gilbert Plains in 1884, after purchasing the first house constructed in the community from Gilbert Ross, for whom the community is named. Two years later, Campbell married Ross' first cousin, Harriet Burns, daughter of the Ojibwa Chief Keeseekoowenin, who had been baptized as "Moses Burns" by the Presbyterian missionary George Flett. who was Campbell's wife's second cousin.

In 1885, Campbell was promoted in the field to rank of captain in the Battle of Batoche as a member of Boulton's Scouts. Campbell was serving as a scout for Major Gen. Middleton.

He first campaigned for the Manitoba legislature in the 1892 provincial election as a support of the opposition Conservative Party, and lost to Theodore Arthur Burrows by nine votes in Dauphin. Burrows described himself as a "Liberal-Conservative", but endorsed the Liberal government of Thomas Greenway; he later joined the Liberal Party outright. Campbell lost to Burrows again in the 1896 election, by twelve votes.

He was first elected to the legislature in the 1903 election, defeated a Liberal candidate by 202 votes in Gilbert Plains. He served as a backbench supporter of Rodmond Roblin's government, and was re-elected without opposition in the 1907 election.

Campbell resigned from the provincial legislature in 1908 to campaign in the 1908 federal election. Contesting the riding of Dauphin, he defeated his old nemesis Theodore Arthur Burrows in 217 votes to win the seat. The Liberal Party won a majority government in this election under Wilfrid Laurier, and Campbell served as an opposition member for the next three years.

He lost his seat to Liberal Robert Cruise by 748 votes in the 1911 election, even as the Conservative Party won a majority government under Robert Borden. When King George V declared war in 1914, Campbell formed Manitoba's 107th Battalion of the Canadian Expeditionary Force which served in France. He died of kidney failure on 20 October 1917 and is buried at Camiers, France.
