= Inky Mark =

Canadian politician

- 麥鼎鴻

Member of Parliament for Dauphin—Swan River—Marquette Dauphin—Swan River (1997–2004)
- In office June 2, 1997 – September 15, 2010
- Preceded by: Marlene Cowling
- Succeeded by: Robert Sopuck

Mayor of Dauphin
- In office 1994–1997

Personal details
- Born: November 17, 1947 (age 78) Taishan, China
- Party: Independent
- Other political affiliations: Progressive Conservative (unknown–1993, 2002–2003); Reform (1993–2000); Canadian Alliance (2000–2001); Democratic Representative Caucus (2001–2002); Independent Conservative (2002); Conservative (2003–2010); Green (2015)
- Spouse: Lynda Mark
- Education: Brandon University (BA); University of Manitoba (BEd)
- Profession: Politician; teacher

Inky Mark (Chinese: 麥鼎鴻; pinyin: Mài Dǐnghóng; born November 17, 1947) is a Canadian politician who served as a member of the House of Commons of Canada, representing the Manitoba riding of Dauphin—Swan River—Marquette from 1997 to 2010. A member of the Conservative Party of Canada, he frequently disagreed with the party's positions and criticized leader and prime minister Stephen Harper. Mark previously served on Dauphin's city council.

In July 2026, Mark was charged with firearms trafficking and owning illegal firearms.

== Early life and education ==
Mark was born in Taishan, China, and moved to Manitoba as a child. Mark's father and grandfather had earlier emigrated from China to Canada, but were unable to bring their families with them due to provisions of the Chinese Immigration Act of 1923. Mark accompanied his mother when she fled China in 1953, and subsequently settled with his family in the Manitoba community of Gilbert Plains.

Mark has a Bachelor of Arts from Brandon University and a Bachelor of Education degree from the University of Manitoba. Before entering political life, he worked as a high school teacher and small businessman. Mark also has a certificate in broadcasting and started a master's degree program in education, although he did not graduate.

== Political career ==
=== Municipal politics ===
Mark's political career started when he joined the Board of Directors of the Dauphin First United Church. He was subsequently elected to the Dauphin town council in 1991, and became the town's mayor in 1994.

=== Federal politics ===
Mark was first elected to the House of Commons in the federal election of 1997, running as a candidate of the Reform Party in the riding of Dauphin—Swan River. From 1997 to 2000, Mark was one of only three Chinese-Canadian MPs in the House of Commons.

The Reform Party dissolved itself in 2000 in favour of the Canadian Alliance, and Mark ran as a candidate of the new party in the federal election which followed.

On September 12, 2001, Mark left the Canadian Alliance caucus to sit as a member of the Democratic Representative Caucus, in alliance with the Progressive Conservative Party.

The DRC came to an end on April 10, 2002, when Stephen Harper replaced Day as Canadian Alliance leader. Every other member of the DRC requested to be re-admitted to the Alliance; Mark did not join them, but instead decided to sit as an "Independent Conservative", with the intention of rejoining the Progressive Conservatives at their annual party convention later in the year; he had been a Progressive Conservative before the early 1990s. Mark formally joined the Progressive Conservatives on August 27, 2002.

In December 2003, the Canadian Alliance and Progressive Conservative Party formally merged to create the new Conservative Party of Canada. Mark supported the merger, and formally joined the new party's caucus on February 2, 2004. Mark was easily re-elected in the 2004 Canadian federal election.

In 2005, Mark alleged that Treasury Board President and Liberal MP Reg Alcock offered him an ambassadorship if he were to resign his seat. Alcock responded by saying, "Frankly, if I was going to recruit somebody, I'd go a little higher up the gene pool." Mark called this comment racist and filed a complaint with the Canadian Human Rights Commission. As the CHRC does not publish its investigations, it is not possible to know the outcome of this case.

During his time as an MP, Mark gained a reputation as "an outsider" within the Conservative caucus. Mark was an outspoken critic of prime minister Stephen Harper, the Prime Minister's Office, and several sitting and former Conservative MPs. He frequently complained that Harper was controlling, and he responded by refusing to attend Conservative events. Mark has called Harper a "fascist" and complained that he runs a "top-down dictatorship".

Following the announcement of his resignation, Mark complained that the nomination race for his successor was rigged, and allowed Robert Sopuck to be acclaimed without competition.

Following his resignation as an MP, Mark stepped up his criticisms of the Harper government. He complained that the nomination race for the Conservative candidate following the resignation of Labrador MP Peter Penashue was rigged because Harper "wants a candidate he can control". He also complained that the nomination race to replace Merv Tweed was rigged, and that the eventual successor, Larry Maguire, was just a "rubber stamp" for Harper. Mark was featured prominently in the book Tragedy in the Commons, where almost every chapter quoted Mark's complaints about the way Harper's government was run.

Mark complained that the Conservatives' Constituent Information Management System (CIMS) was a secretive database used to track and control Canadians' information and voting preferences, and said that Harper could simply "switch off" this system to punish an MP.

During his tenure as an MP, Mark was always a "backbencher".

==== Parliamentary work ====
In 2001, as the Alliance's parliamentary critic for Immigration, Mark was responsible for expressing his party's position on the Liberal government's Immigration and Refugee Protection Act, which he did during the immigration controversy involving the Sklarzyk family who, as a result of an administrative error, were deported from Canada to Poland in May 2001. He also contributed to the parliamentary committee's work in drafting the final version of the bill, and was generally regarded by MPs from all parties as having made several constructive criticisms to the legislation.

However, on June 13, 2001, Mark's position on the bill was undercut by Canadian Alliance leader Stockwell Day, who delivered a speech in parliament supporting tighter restrictions against refugee claimants and reduced opportunities for rejected claimants to appeal to the Refugee Board. Day's comments diverged from Mark's stated position on several particulars, and his speech was regarded as very surprising by many other MPs in the House of Commons. For example, Liberal MP Steve Mahoney referred to Day's comments as "treachery" towards Mark, for which he was ruled out of order by the Speaker.

In 2005, Mark's private members' Bill C-331 (Internment of Persons of Ukrainian Origin Recognition Act) was passed by the House of Commons and Senate of Canada, eventually resulting in the establishment of the Endowment Council of the Canadian First World War Internment Recognition Fund, supporting educational and commemorative projects recalling Canada's first national internment operations of 1914–1920.

=== Post–federal politics ===
Mark announced in June 2009 that he would be resigning before the next federal election. On August 16, 2010, he announced that he would step down as an MP on September 15 to campaign for another term as mayor of Dauphin. However, he lost to Eric Irwin.

Mark announced on November 13, 2014, that he would be running as an independent candidate for the 2015 federal election in Dauphin—Swan River—Neepawa, which includes nearly all of his old riding. Mark announced that he is now a member of the Green Party of Canada, but would still seek election in 2015 as an independent candidate. Mark finished a distant fourth behind Sopuck, garnering only eight percent of the vote.

== Personal life ==
On July 7, 2026, Mark was arrested after the Royal Canadian Mounted Police executed search warrants at his Dauphin residence as part of a firearms-trafficking investigation. Police reported seizing 439 firearms, ammunition, an antique cannon and more than $300,000 in cash. Mark was charged with 12 firearms-related offences, including firearm trafficking, possession of a firearm with a tampered serial number, possession of property obtained by crime, careless use of a firearm and unsafe storage of firearms. He was subsequently released on a release order. The allegations have not been tested in court.

== Electoral record ==
2015 Canadian federal election: Dauphin—Swan River—Neepawa
Party	Candidate	Votes	%	±%	Expenditures
Conservative	Robert Sopuck	19,276	46.34	-18.18	$96,511.06
Liberal	Ray Piché	12,276	29.51	+23.18	$30,343.94
New Democratic	Laverne Lewycky	5,097	12.25	-12.56	$18,323.29
Independent	Inky Mark	3,397	8.07	–	$7,495.11
Green	Kate Storey	1,592	3.83	-0.44	$8,600.31
Total valid votes/expense limit		41,598	100.00		$247,596.77
Total rejected ballots		160	0.38	–	
Turnout		41,758	66.09	–	
Eligible voters		63,187			
Conservative hold		Swing		-20.68	
Source: Elections Canada

2008 Canadian federal election
Party	Candidate	Votes	%	±%	Expenditures
Conservative	Inky Mark	18,132	61.36	+2.28	$42,460
New Democratic	Ron Strynadka	4,914	16.63	-1.67	$5,103
Liberal	Wendy Menzies	4,128	13.97	-4.18	$22,590
Green	Kate Storey	1,923	6.51	+2.84	
Christian Heritage	David Andres	356	1.20	+0.40	
People's Political Power	Charles Prefontaine	96	0.32	–	$1,294
Total valid votes/Expense limit		29,549	100.00		$95,083
Total rejected ballots		107	0.36	-0.09	
Turnout		29,656	55	–	
Conservative hold		Swing		+2.0	

2006 Canadian federal election
Party	Candidate	Votes	%	±%	Expenditures
Conservative	Inky Mark	20,084	59.08	+5.13	$42,115
New Democratic	Walter Kolisnyk	6,221	18.30	-3.67	$21,849
Liberal	Don Dewar	6,171	18.15	-2.23	$19,220
Green	Kathy Storey	1,246	3.67	+1.66	$2,759
Christian Heritage	Iris Yawney	273	0.80	-0.88	$920
Total valid votes		33,995	100.00		
Total rejected ballots		154	0.45	-0.05	
Turnout		34,149	62	–	
Conservative hold		Swing		+4.4	

2004 Canadian federal election
Party	Candidate	Votes	%	±%	Expenditures
Conservative	Inky Mark	18,025	53.95	-5.57^	$45,456
New Democratic	Walter Kolisnyk	7,341	21.97	+4.50	$41,153
Liberal	Don Dewar	6,809	20.38	-0.94	$31,775
Green	Lindy Clubb	673	2.01	–	$593
Christian Heritage	David Andres	560	1.68	–	$2,974
Total valid votes		33,408	100.00		
Total rejected ballots		168	0.50	+0.06	
Turnout		33,576	58.6	-4.9	
Conservative hold		Swing		-5.0	

^ Change is from the total of Progressive Conservative and Canadian Alliance votes in the 2000 election.

2000 Canadian federal election
Party	Candidate	Votes	%	±%	Expenditures
Alliance	Inky Mark	15,855	47.66	+12.17	$30,460
Liberal	Jane Dawson	7,091	21.32	+0.57	$32,160
New Democratic	Wayne Kines	5,813	17.47	-3.75	$24,855
Progressive Conservative	Keith Eliasson	3,946	11.86	-9.76	$3,345
Canadian Action	Terry Drul	372	1.12	–	$3,068
Independent	Iris Yawney	189	0.57	–	$5,508
Total valid votes		33,266	100.00		
Total rejected ballots		148	0.44	+0.10	
Turnout		33,414	63.5	-1.9	
Alliance hold		Swing		+5.8	

Note: Canadian Alliance vote is compared to Reform Party vote in 1997 election.

1997 Canadian federal election
Party	Candidate	Votes	%	±%	Expenditures
Reform	Inky Mark	12,668	35.49	+5.96	$32,650
Progressive Conservative	Lorne Boguski	7,716	21.62	+5.85	$50,353
New Democratic	Betty Findlay	7,575	21.22	-0.97	$48,818
Liberal	Marlene Cowling	7,408	20.75	-10.98	$44,417
Independent	Tony Riley	326	0.91	+0.13	$2,130
Total valid votes		35,693	100.00		
Total rejected ballots		122	0.34	–	
Turnout		35,815	65.4	–	
Reform gain from Liberal		Swing		-8.5	
