= Laverne Lewycky =

Canadian politician

Member of Parliament for Dauphin
- In office February 18, 1980 – September 4, 1984
- Preceded by: Gordon Ritchie
- Succeeded by: Brian White

Personal details
- Born: 12 February 1946 Dauphin, Manitoba, Canada
- Died: 3 August 2020 (aged 74) Dauphin, Manitoba, Canada
- Party: New Democratic Party
- Spouse: Lois (Reimer) Lewycky
- Profession: executive assistant, professor

Laverne Mitchell Lewycky (12 February 1946 – 3 August 2020) was a Canadian politician and New Democratic Party member of the House of Commons of Canada. He was a professor of sociology and communication studies, who also served as an executive assistant and consultant to governments and other organizations by career.

He represented Manitoba's Dauphin electoral district for one term in the 32nd Canadian Parliament. Following two attempts at the riding in 1974 and 1979, he succeeded in the 1980 federal election. His political portfolio was multiculturalism. Lewycky served on Constitution Committee, Special Parliamentary Committee on Participation of Visible Minorities in Canadian Society, and standing committees on management and members' services, privileges and elections, agriculture, miscellaneous estimates as well as the Special Joint Committee on Official Languages. His private member's bill changed the name of the riding from Dauphin to Dauphin-Swan River. Lewycky left national politics to do doctoral studies after the 1984 election.

Professionally, as an educator, Lewycky was a university and college professor who taught in Manitoba, Ontario, Quebec and New Brunswick. As a consultant, he worked as an internal communications advisor and an advanced communications officer with various federal government departments such as Health Canada and Canada Revenue Agency. As a public speaker, he has been a Dale Carnegie Public Speaking Courses instructor in Winnipeg and Montreal. Additionally, he has served as a distinguished toastmaster (DTM) in Manitoba, New Brunswick and Ontario. Currently he works out of Dauphin, Manitoba.

Educationally, he graduated from the Dauphin Collegiate & Technical Institute (DCTI). He then graduated from the University of Manitoba with his B.A. (Hons.) and M.A. degrees. He has done doctoral studies at McGill University, Carleton University and Providence Seminary. He has published various chapters in books and peer-reviewed journals, especially in the area of multiculturalism. He was a Parliamentary Committee Member that authored the milestone report, Equality Now! He also served as a consultant for the Standing Committee on Multiculturalism that produced Multiculturalism: Building the Canadian Mosaic.

As an ordained minister, Lewycky has served congregations in Manitoba, Ontario, Quebec and New Brunswick. Inter-denominationally, he has also provided pulpit supply, and been an officiant for baptisms, marriages and funerals. He has served on numerous proclamations and prayer breakfast committees and as a guest speaker.

His leadership as a multicultural Ukrainian-Canadian has been pictured and cited in The Ukrainian Canadians: a History by Michael H. Marunchak. Lewycky died on 3 August 2020.

== Electoral record ==
=== Dauphin—Swan River—Neepawa ===
2019 Canadian federal election: Dauphin—Swan River—Neepawa
Party	Candidate	Votes	%	±%	Expenditures
Conservative	Dan Mazier	26,103	64.2	+17.86	$47,835.45
New Democratic	Laverne Lewycky	5,724	14.1	+1.85	none listed
Liberal	Cathy Scofield-Singh	5,344	13.2	-16.31	$10,110.34
Green	Kate Storey	2,214	5.5	+1.67	none listed
People's	Frank Godon	711	1.8	–	none listed
Christian Heritage	Jenni Johnson	470	1.2	–	none listed
Total valid votes/expense limit		40,566	100.0		–
Total rejected ballots		279	–	–	
Turnout		40,845	66.2	–	
Eligible voters		61,722			
Conservative hold		Swing		+8.01	
Source: Elections Canada

2015 Canadian federal election: Dauphin—Swan River—Neepawa
Party	Candidate	Votes	%	±%	Expenditures
Conservative	Robert Sopuck	19,276	46.34	-18.18	$96,511.06
Liberal	Ray Piché	12,276	29.51	+23.18	$30,343.94
New Democratic	Laverne Lewycky	5,097	12.25	-12.56	$18,323.29
Independent	Inky Mark	3,397	8.07	–	$7,495.11
Green	Kate Storey	1,592	3.83	-0.44	$8,600.31
Total valid votes/expense limit		41,598	100.00		$247,596.77
Total rejected ballots		160	0.38	–	
Turnout		41,758	66.09	–	
Eligible voters		63,187			
Conservative hold		Swing		-20.68	
Source: Elections Canada

=== Dauphin—Swan River ===
1984 Canadian federal election
Party	Candidate	Votes	%	±%
Progressive Conservative	Brian White	11,973	42.56	+4.1
New Democratic	Laverne Lewycky	10,219	36.32	-8.5
Liberal	Doug Cowling	4,352	15.47	-1.3
Confederation of Regions	Douglas Switzer	1,589	5.65	
Total valid votes		28,133	100.0	

=== Dauphin ===
1980 Canadian federal election
Party	Candidate	Votes	%	±%
New Democratic	Laverne Lewycky	12,960	44.8	+3.2
Progressive Conservative	Orville Heschuk	11,116	38.4	-4.8
Liberal	Ron Hale	4,849	16.8	+1.5
Total valid votes		28,925	100.0	

1979 Canadian federal election
Party	Candidate	Votes	%	±%
Progressive Conservative	Gordon Ritchie	12,239	43.2	-3.5
New Democratic	Laverne Lewycky	11,770	41.6	+9.9
Liberal	Robert Klimchuk	4,311	15.2	-6.4
Total valid votes		28,320	100.0	

1974 Canadian federal election
Party	Candidate	Votes	%	±%
Progressive Conservative	Gordon Ritchie	11,439	46.7	-7.7
New Democratic	Laverne Lewycky	7,743	31.6	+4.7
Liberal	Ronald Hale	5,300	21.6	+3.0
Total valid votes		24,482	100.0	
