= Portage—Marquette =

Former federal electoral district in Manitoba, Canada

Portage—Marquette was a federal electoral district in Manitoba, Canada, that was represented in the House of Commons of Canada from 1979 to 1988.

This riding was created in 1976 from parts of Marquette and Portage ridings. It was abolished in 1987 when it was redistributed into Brandon—Souris, Dauphin—Swan River, Lisgar—Marquette, and Portage—Interlake ridings.

== Election results ==
1979 Canadian federal election
| Party | Candidate | Votes |
|---|---|---|
| Progressive Conservative | MAYER, Charlie | 18,824 |
| New Democratic | LELOND, Maude | 6,612 |
| Liberal | SPONARSKI, Joe | 6,164 |
| Social Credit | BAKER, K.F. | 347 |
| Independent | MORRISON, Kenneth B. | 319 |

1980 Canadian federal election
| Party | Candidate | Votes |
|---|---|---|
| Progressive Conservative | MAYER, Charlie | 16,219 |
| New Democratic | LELOND, Maude | 7,221 |
| Liberal | SPONARSKI, Joe | 6,973 |
| Marxist–Leninist | MICHALCHUK, Douglas | 174 |

1984 Canadian federal election
| Party | Candidate | Votes |
|---|---|---|
| Progressive Conservative | MAYER, Charles | 15,378 |
| Confederation of Regions | EDMONDSON, Doug | 6,957 |
| New Democratic | GRANT, Garry | 4,447 |
| Liberal | SUDERMAN, Abe | 4,161 |
| Libertarian | OWENS, Dennis | 204 |

== See also ==
- List of Canadian electoral districts
- Historical federal electoral districts of Canada
