= Elmer Forbes =

Canadian politician (1894–1978)

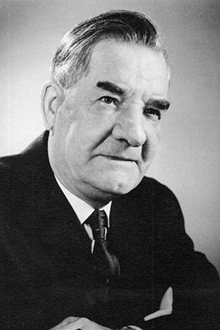

Member of Parliament for Dauphin
- In office 31 March 1958 – 24 June 1968
- Preceded by: Fred Zaplitny
- Succeeded by: Gordon Ritchie

Personal details
- Born: Richard Elmer Forbes; 5 December 1894 Bruce County, Ontario, Canada
- Died: 9 December 1978 (aged 84) Dauphin, Manitoba, Canada
- Party: Progressive Conservative
- Profession: Farmer, Registered Seed Grower

Richard Elmer Forbes (5 December 1894 – 9 December 1978) was a Progressive Conservative party member of the House of Commons of Canada. He was born in Bruce County, Ontario and became a farmer and registered seed grower by career.

He was first elected at the Dauphin riding in the 1958 general election after an initial unsuccessful attempt to win the seat in 1953. He was re-elected in 1962, 1963 and 1965.

After completing his term in the 27th Canadian Parliament in 1968, Forbes left federal politics and did not seek another term in Parliament.
