= Gordon Ritchie =

Canadian politician (1918–1998)

Member of Parliament for Dauphin
- In office 1968–1980
- Preceded by: Elmer Forbes
- Succeeded by: Laverne Lewycky

Personal details
- Born: William Gordon Ritchie; 27 September 1918 Dauphin, Manitoba
- Died: 20 November 1998 (aged 80) Dauphin, Manitoba
- Party: Progressive Conservative
- Education: University of St. Andrews
- Profession: Surgeon, physician

William Gordon Ritchie (27 September 1918 – 20 November 1998) was a Progressive Conservative party member of the House of Commons of Canada. He studied MB ChB medicine at the University of St Andrews School of Medicine. He was a surgeon and physician by career.

Ritchie represented the Dauphin electoral district where he won office in the 1968 federal election. He was re-elected in 1972, 1974 and 1979. After serving successive terms from the 28th to the 31st Canadian Parliaments, Ritchie left federal politics in 1980 and did not campaign in that year's national elections.

Ritchie also made one early unsuccessful attempt to win the Dauphin seat in the 1957 federal election.

He died in 1998 at Dauphin.
