= Lisgar—Marquette =

Former federal electoral district in Manitoba, Canada

Lisgar—Marquette was a federal electoral district in the province of Manitoba, Canada, that was represented in the House of Commons of Canada from 1988 to 1997. This riding was created in 1987 from parts of Lisgar, Portage—Marquette, Brandon—Souris and Dauphin—Swan River ridings. Lisgar—Marquette consisted of an area bordering on the city of Brandon, Manitoba.

The electoral district was abolished in 1996 when it was redistributed between Brandon—Souris, Dauphin—Swan River and Portage—Lisgar ridings.

== Electoral history ==
1988 Canadian federal election
Party	Candidate	Votes
Progressive Conservative	Charlie Mayer	17,484
Liberal	Bonnie Alston	7,174
Reform	Roy McLaren	2,832
New Democratic	Fred Tait	2,199
Christian Heritage	Don Esler	1,801
Confederation of Regions	Geo. G. Elias	495
Rhinoceros	Uncle Bill Harrison	435

1993 Canadian federal election
Party	Candidate	Votes
Reform	Jake E. Hoeppner	13,385
Liberal	Grant Johnson	8,730
Progressive Conservative	Charlie Mayer	7,824
New Democratic	Leslie King	1,808
Christian Heritage	Martin Dewitt	399
National	Larry Jeffers	353
Canada Party	Roy Lyall	116

== See also ==
- List of Canadian electoral districts
- Historical federal electoral districts of Canada
