= Charles Mayer (politician) =

Canadian politician (1936–2025)

The Honourable Charles James Mayer PC

Member of Parliament for Lisgar—Marquette Portage—Marquette (1979–1987)
- In office 22 May 1979 – 24 October 1993
- Preceded by: Riding created
- Succeeded by: Jake E. Hoeppner

Personal details
- Born: 21 April 1936 Saskatoon, Saskatchewan, Canada
- Died: 29 April 2025 (aged 89) Winnipeg, Manitoba, Canada
- Party: Progressive Conservative
- Education: University of Saskatchewan
- Profession: Farmer, politician

Charles James Mayer, PC (21 April 1936 – 29 April 2025) was a Canadian businessman and federal Minister of Agriculture.

== Life and career ==
Mayer was educated at the University of Saskatchewan and became an agrologist and farmer. Politically active, Mayer was president of the Manitoba Beef Growers Association before entering the House of Commons of Canada as a Progressive Conservative Member of Parliament in 1979. He represented the Manitoba riding of Portage—Marquette (later Lisgar—Marquette) until his defeat in 1993.

He served in the Brian Mulroney government as Minister of State for the Canadian Wheat Board until 1987 and then was Minister of State for Grains and Oilseeds until 1993, also serving as Minister of Western Economic Diversification from 1989. In early 1993, he was promoted to Minister of Agriculture and was retained in that position during the short-lived government of Mulroney's successor, Kim Campbell.

He endorsed Lawrence Toet when he attempted to be the Conservative candidate in the 2023 Portage—Lisgar federal by-election.

Mayer died at St. Boniface Hospital in Winnipeg on 29 April 2025, at the age of 89.

25th Canadian Ministry (1993) – Cabinet of Kim Campbell
Cabinet post (1)
Predecessor	Office	Successor
cont'd from 24th Ministry	Minister of Agriculture; 1993	Ralph Goodale
24th Canadian Ministry (1984–1993) – Cabinet of Brian Mulroney
Cabinet post (1)
Predecessor	Office	Successor
Bill McKnight	Minister of Agriculture; 1993	cont'd into 25th Ministry
