= Robert Sopuck =

Canadian politician (1951–2024)

Member of Parliament for Dauphin—Swan River—Neepawa Dauphin—Swan River—Marquette (2010–2015)
- In office November 29, 2010 – September 11, 2019
- Preceded by: Inky Mark
- Succeeded by: Dan Mazier

Personal details
- Born: 11 July 1951 Winnipeg, Manitoba, Canada
- Died: 23 October 2024 (aged 73)
- Party: Conservative
- Spouse: Caroline
- Education: University of Manitoba (BS, 1973); Cornell University (MS, 1975)
- Profession: Biologist, conservationist, farmer, politician
- Website: www.robertsopuck.ca

Robert David Sopuck (11 July 1951 – 23 October 2024) was a Canadian politician who served as a Member of Parliament in the House of Commons of Canada from 2010 to 2019. First elected in a by-election on November 29, 2010, Sopuck represented the riding of Dauphin—Swan River—Marquette from 2010 to 2015 and then the riding of Dauphin—Swan River—Neepawa, which largely replaced it, to 2019. He was a member of the Conservative Party of Canada.

== Biography ==
=== Early life and education ===
Robert Sopuck was born in Winnipeg, Manitoba on 11 July 1951, one of three children of Joseph R. Sopuck and Ida Lulewick. He received his Bachelor of Science from the University of Manitoba in 1973 and Master of Science from Cornell University (1975) in Ithaca, New York.

=== Fisheries biology and conservation ===
His first professional experience (1976–1979) was in fisheries management where he was the district biologist (Eastern Arctic) for the federal Department of Fisheries and Oceans and then as fisheries biologist for the province of Manitoba. From 1979 to 1988, he ran his grain farm and he operated an outfitting business near Riding Mountain National Park for some years as well.

From 1988 to 1996 he coordinated the sustainable development initiative for the province of Manitoba, serving as Manitoba's observer on the founding board of the International Institute for Sustainable Development. In 1996 he took a position with the Pine Falls Paper Company as director of environmental programs, a position he held until 1998. He was also on the board of the Manitoba Habitat Heritage Corporation at this time.

Sopuck was the vice-president of policy (Western Canada) for the Delta Waterfowl Foundation from 2000 to 2009, and the Director of the "Smart Green" environmental policy project and the "Rural Renaissance Project" for the Frontier Centre for Public Policy. He chaired the board of the Manitoba fisheries development group known as the Fish and Lake Improvement Program for the Parkland Region. During the winter of 2009/2010, he was a natural resources specialist with AMEC Earth and Environmental Limited and supervised an oil exploration and drilling program in Alberta.

In October 2007, John Baird, the federal Minister of the Environment, appointed him to the National Round Table on the Environment and the Economy. He has operated a grain and oilseed farm, a small outfitting business, and carried out consulting work in the areas of environmental assessment and resource management. Sopuck's passion and experience in conservation, biology, and farming led to his becoming known as "the right-wing environmentalist."

=== Columnist and author ===
Throughout his professional career, Sopuck also served as the hunting and outdoors columnist for the Winnipeg Free Press. Sopuck's articles featured a variety of perspectives on the rural Canadian way of life.

In November 2014, Sopuck announced that he was publishing his first book, A Life Outdoors: Essays on Hunting, Gathering and Country Living in the 21st Century. The book features a collection of his articles written for the Winnipeg Free Press, recipes featuring wild game meat, and new essays.

=== Personal life and death ===
Sopuck resided on his farm in the Sandy Lake area of Manitoba with his wife, Caroline. He had two children and three grandchildren.

Sopuck died on 23 October 2024, at the age of 73.

== Election and parliamentary work ==
=== 2010 to 2015 ===
With Inky Mark announcing that he would be resigning as the MP for Dauphin—Swan River—Marquette in June 2009, Stephen Harper, the Prime Minister of Canada, called a by-election to be held on November 29, 2010. Sopuck was acclaimed as the Conservative candidate, and won the by-election with over 56% of the vote. In the 2011 federal election, Sopuck increased his vote count, with over 63% of the vote.

From 2010 to 2015, Sopuck was a member of the Standing Committee for Environment and Sustainable Development and the Standing Committee on Fisheries and Oceans. In addition, he chaired the Manitoba Regional Caucus, which was the group of Conservative MPs representing Manitoba electoral districts who met before national caucus meetings.

From 2011 to 2013 Sopuck served as Chair of the Canada-Ukraine Parliamentary Friendship Group. This is a non-partisan group open to all Parliamentarians seeking to promote positive relations between Canada and Ukraine. Conservative MP Ted Opitz succeeded Sopuck as chair in 2013.

In 2012, Sopuck was instrumental in founding the Conservative Hunting and Angling Caucus. The caucus, which has since grown to over 30 Conservative Members of Parliament, serves as a venue for Members of Parliament to discuss the common concerns of their constituents and move forward with solutions from the government that respect hunters and anglers. It also serves in an outreach role to meet with hunters, anglers, and trappers across the country to ensure their wealth of knowledge on environmental conservation is heard by our government. Sopuck was the chair of this caucus.

=== 2015 federal election ===
In the summer of 2014, Sopuck was confirmed as the Conservative candidate for the new riding of Dauphin—Swan River—Neepawa. Despite the Conservatives losing almost 40 percent of their seats nationally, Sopuck comfortably won the riding for the Conservatives with over 46 percent of the vote.

=== 42nd Canadian Parliament ===
With the Conservatives being elected as the Official Opposition and Rona Ambrose being elected as interim Leader, on November 20, 2015, Sopuck was appointed the Critic for Wildlife Conservation and Parks Canada.

Sopuck did not run for re-election in the 2019 federal election.

== Awards ==
In February 2008, Sopuck was awarded the Outdoor Heritage Award from the Manitoba Wildlife Federation. The award thanked him "For protecting and enhancing our hunting heritage and passing on these traditions in good health to future generations."

In 2013, Sopuck was awarded the Queen's Diamond Jubilee Medal. It was awarded to "honour significant contributions and achievements by Canadians."

In June 2014, Sopuck received the Canadian Wildlife Federation's Past Presidents' Award, which is awarded to "elected legislators for their contributions to the conservation of wildlife in Canada."

== Electoral record ==
2015 Canadian federal election: Dauphin—Swan River—Neepawa
Party	Candidate	Votes	%	±%	Expenditures
Conservative	Robert Sopuck	19,276	46.34	-18.18	$96,511.06
Liberal	Ray Piché	12,276	29.51	+23.18	$30,343.94
New Democratic	Laverne Lewycky	5,097	12.25	-12.56	$18,323.29
Independent	Inky Mark	3,397	8.07	–	$7,495.11
Green	Kate Storey	1,592	3.83	-0.44	$8,600.31
Total valid votes/expense limit		41,598	100.00		$247,596.77
Total rejected ballots		160	0.38	–	
Turnout		41,758	66.09	–	
Eligible voters		63,187			
Conservative hold		Swing		-20.68	
Source: Elections Canada

2011 Canadian federal election: Dauphin—Swan River—Marquette
Party	Candidate	Votes	%	±%	Expenditures
Conservative	Robert Sopuck	18,543	63.09	+6.60	–
New Democratic	Cheryl Osborne	7,657	26.05	-0.40	–
Liberal	Wendy Menzies	1,947	6.62	-3.70	–
Green	Kate Storey	1,243	4.23	-1.39	–
Conservative hold		Swing		+3.5	
Total valid votes/expense limit		29,390	100.00		–
Total rejected ballots		92	0.31	-0.12	
Turnout		29,482	55.69	+29.07	
Eligible voters		52,941	–	–	

Canadian federal by-election, November 29, 2010: Dauphin—Swan River—Marquette
Party	Candidate	Votes	%	±%	Expenditures
Conservative	Robert Sopuck	8,034	56.49	-4.87	–
New Democratic	Denise Harder	3,762	26.45	+9.82	–
Liberal	Christopher Scott Sarna	1,468	10.32	-3.65	–
Green	Kate Storey	799	5.62	-0.89	–
Christian Heritage	Jerome Dondo	159	1.12	-0.08	–
Total valid votes/Expense limit		14,222	100.00		–
Total rejected ballots		61	0.43	+0.07	
Turnout		14,283	26.62	-28	
Eligible voters		53,660	–	–	
Conservative hold		Swing		-7.13	
By-election due to the resignation of Inky Mark.
