= James Bezan =

Canadian politician

James Bezan MP
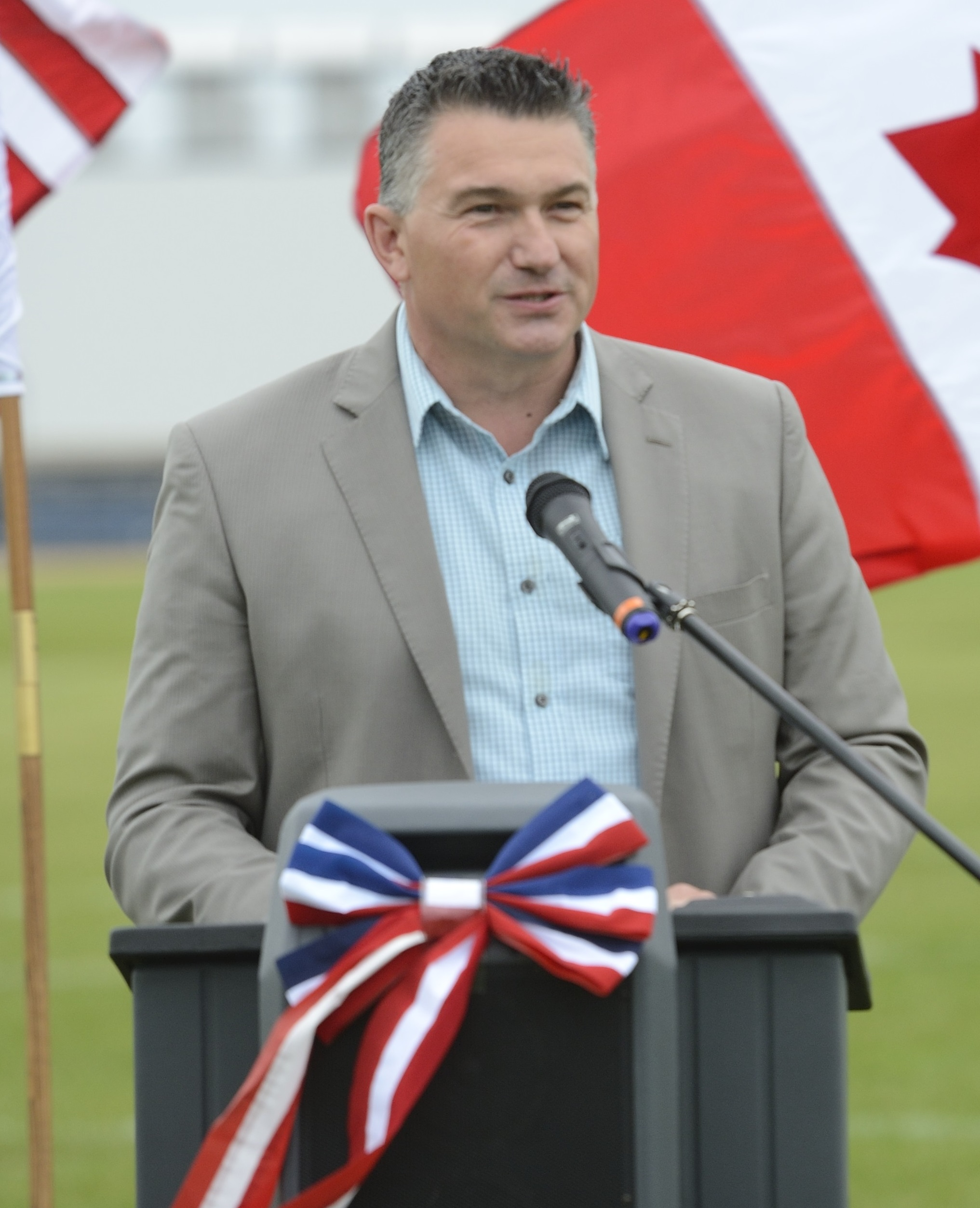
- Bezan in 2014

Member of Parliament for Selkirk—Interlake—Eastman Selkirk—Interlake (2004–2015)
- Incumbent
- Assumed office June 28, 2004
- Preceded by: Howard Hilstrom

Shadow Minister of National Defence
- Incumbent
- Assumed office October 12, 2022
- Leader: Pierre Poilievre

Official Opposition Deputy Whip
- In office November 9, 2021 – February 5, 2022
- Leader: Erin O’Toole
- Succeeded by: Chris Warkentin (As Deputy Whip & Question Period Coordinator)

Personal details
- Born: May 19, 1965 (age 61) Russell, Manitoba, Canada
- Party: Conservative
- Spouse: Kelly Murray Bezan
- Relatives: Ken Dryden (third cousin); David Iftody (second cousin)

James Bezan MP (born May 19, 1965) is a Conservative Canadian politician who has represented the riding of Selkirk—Interlake—Eastman (formerly Selkirk—Interlake) in the House of Commons of Canada since 2004. He is the Conservative Shadow Minister for National Defence.

== Early life and career ==
Bezan was born May 19, 1965, in Russell, Manitoba. He majored in livestock technology in Olds College's Agricultural Production program. Bezan worked in the livestock and cattle industries in the 1980s and 1990s and started his own company in 1996. He was Chief Executive Officer of the Manitoba Cattle Producer's Association and has sat on boards in the fields of cattle and food production. He also operates a family farm near Teulon, Manitoba.

== Federal politics ==
Bezan was first elected in the riding of Selkirk—Interlake in the 2004 federal election, and was re-elected in the 2006, 2008, 2011, 2015, 2019, 2021, and 2025 federal elections.

As a member of government from 2006 to 2015, Bezan was Chair of the Standing Committee on Agriculture and Agri-Food; Chair of the Standing Committee on Environment and Sustainable Development; Chair of the Manitoba Conservative Caucus; Chair of the Canadian Section of the Inter-Parliamentary Forum of the Americas (FIPA); and Secretary of the Canada-Ukraine Parliamentary Friendship Group.

=== Opposition MP (2004—2006) ===
Following his election in 2004, Bezan was on the executive of the Canada-Europe Parliamentary Association and as the Conservative Associate Agriculture Critic.

=== Government MP (2006—2015) ===
In the 38th Canadian Parliament, Bezan tabled Motion M-309 which sought to increase benefits for parents of critically ill children. This motion became law within Government Bill C-44 in 2012 which proposes a new Employment Insurance (EI) special benefit for parents who take time off work to care for their critically ill or injured children.

In the 2006 federal election resulting in the 39th Canadian Parliament, Bezan was re-elected, defeating former Manitoba premier and Governor General of Canada Ed Schreyer, who ran for the New Democratic Party. In the 39th Parliament, Bezan passed Private Member's Bill C-459, which established the Ukrainian Famine and Genocide Memorial Day and recognizes the Ukrainian Famine of 1932-33, the Holodomor, as an act of genocide. Bezan was awarded the Order of Prince Yaroslav the Wise, Ukraine's highest civilian award, by the president of Ukraine.

In the 40th Canadian Parliament, Bezan tabled a Private Member's Bill, C-497, to strengthen warning labelling on tanning beds on the carcinogenic risks from radiation caused by tanning equipment. Bezan's wife, Kelly, has survived melanoma skin cancer on a number of occasions.

==== 41st Canadian Parliament (2011—2015) ====
In the 41st Canadian Parliament, Bezan introduced three pieces of legislation. The first was the Tanning Equipment Prohibition and Warning (Cancer Risks) Act (Bill C-386), which he had previously introduced in the 40th Canadian Parliament. This Bill influenced the Government to put warning labels about the health risks of indoor tanning on tanning equipment in February 2013. The second was the Act to amend the Excise Act, 2001 (spirits) which sought to reduce the payable on absolute ethyl alcohol contained in spirits produced in Canada by $1. The bill completed first reading on October 23, 2012, but did not reach second reading. The third and final piece of legislation introduced by Bezan in the 41st Parliament was Bill C-478, The Respecting Families of Murdered and Brutalized Persons Act, tabled by Bezan in February 2013. This Bill sought to extend the parole eligibility period for those convicted of the abduction, sexual assault and murder of an individual. The Bill completed second reading in June 2013 but did not become law before parliament dissolved. Bezan later re-introduced the Bill in the 42nd Parliament and the 44th Parliament.

In the first session of the 41st Parliament, Bezan w as the Chair of the Standing Committee on National Defence and was elected as the Vice President of the Canada-Ukraine Parliamentary Friendship Group and executive member for the Canadian Section of ParlAmericas. During the 41st Parliament, Bezan founded and co-chairs the Canadian Parliamentarians for Democracy and Human Rights in Iran, which is an all-party group.

Throughout his time in Parliament, Bezan has worked on Ukrainian and Iranian human rights and democracy issues. Bezan travelled with Prime Minister Harper to Ukraine in 2010 and 2015 and has been an election monitor in the last four Ukrainian elections. Bezan lobbied to have the Iranian embassy shut down and have the MeK delisted as a terrorist organization. Both of these actions by Bezan were acted upon by the Government of Canada during the 41st Canadian Parliament.

Bezan was one of thirteen Canadians banned from travelling to Russia under retaliatory sanctions imposed by Russian president Vladimir Putin in March 2014. He replied through his official Twitter feed, "Sanctions by Russia will not silence me standing up for Ukraine. This is a badge of honour for all critics of the Crimea Invasion."

===== Parliamentary Secretary to the Minister of National Defence (2013—2015) =====
On September 19, 2013, Bezan was appointed by Prime Minister Stephen Harper as the Parliamentary Secretary to the Minister of National Defence. He began the 2nd session of the 41st Parliament with this role.

=== Return to Opposition (2015—Present) ===
Bezan was re-elected to a fifth term in the 2015 Canadian Election, which saw the Conservative Party reduced to the Official Opposition.

In the 42nd Parliament and 43rd Parliament, Bezan was the Shadow Minister for National Defence and Vice Chair of the House Standing Committee on National Defence. In 2017, Bezan sponsored the Justice for Victims of Corrupt Foreign Officials Act (Sergei Magnitsky Law) in the House of Commons after it had been introduced in the Senate. The Bill enables Canada to independently impose sanctions, travel bans, and asset freezes on corrupt foreign officials and human rights abusers. The Bill passed unanimously in the House of Commons and received royal assent in October 2017.

In the 44th Parliament, was the Deputy Whip of the Official Opposition and later the Shadow Minister for Ethics under then Conservative Party leader Erin O'Toole. Following O'Toole's ouster as leader, Bezan returned to his position as the Shadow Minister for National Defence under the leadership of Pierre Poilievre.

In the 2025 Canadian Election, Bezan was re-elected for the 8th term and continued as the Shadow Minister for National Defence. He was elected vice chair of the Canadian House of Commons Standing Committee on National Defence. In September 2025, he introduced Bill C-219, the Sergei Magnitsky International Anti-Corruption and Human Rights Act, which seeks to strengthen Canada's sanctions regime.

== Electoral record ==
2025 Canadian federal election: Selkirk—Interlake—Eastman
** Preliminary results — Not yet official **
| Party | Candidate | Votes | % | ±% | Expenditures |
|---|---|---|---|---|---|
| Conservative | James Bezan | 32,574 | 60.3 | +3.3 | |
| Liberal | Rhonda Nichol | 16,367 | 30.3 | +17.1 | |
| New Democratic | Josef Estabrooks | 3,491 | 6.5 | -12.9 | |
| Green | Wayne James | 721 | 1.3 | -1.4 | |
| People's | Byron Gryba | 468 | 0.9 | -6.8 | |
| United | Chris Riddell | 412 | 0.8 | – | |
| Total valid votes/expense limit | | 54,033 | | | |
| Total rejected ballots | | | | | |
| Turnout | | | | | |
| Eligible voters | | 76,591 | | | |
Source: Elections Canada

2021 Canadian federal election: Selkirk—Interlake—Eastman
| Party | Candidate | Votes | % | ±% | Expenditures |
|---|---|---|---|---|---|
| Conservative | James Bezan | 28,308 | 57.1 | -5.6 | $59,811.25 |
| New Democratic | Margaret Smith | 9,604 | 19.4 | +1.5 | $6,587.46 |
| Liberal | Detlev Regelsky | 6,567 | 13.2 | +1.1 | $9,990.47 |
| People's | Ian Kathwaroon | 3,800 | 7.7 | +6.3 | $2,309.10 |
| Green | Wayne James | 1,328 | 2.7 | -3.2 | $3,024.88 |
| Total valid votes/expense limit | | 49,607 | 99.3 | – | $120,770.45 |
| Total rejected ballots | | 363 | 0.7 | | |
| Turnout | | 49,970 | 66.2 | | |
| Eligible voters | | 75,440 | | | |
| Conservative hold | | Swing | | -3.6 | |
Source: Elections Canada

2019 Canadian federal election: Selkirk—Interlake—Eastman
| Party | Candidate | Votes | % | ±% | Expenditures |
|---|---|---|---|---|---|
| Conservative | James Bezan | 31,109 | 62.7 | +10.80 | $53,785.73 |
| New Democratic | Robert A. Smith | 8,873 | 17.9 | +6.46 | none listed |
| Liberal | Detlev Regelsky | 6,003 | 12.1 | -19.32 | none listed |
| Green | Wayne James | 2,934 | 5.9 | +5.90 | none listed |
| People's | Ian Kathwaroon | 683 | 1.4 | | $0.00 |
| Total valid votes/expense limit | | 49,602 | 100 | | |
| Total rejected ballots | | 322 | | | |
| Turnout | | 49,924 | 68.7 | | |
| Eligible voters | | 72,707 | | | |
| Conservative hold | | Swing | | -5.68 | |
Source: Elections Canada

2015 Canadian federal election: Selkirk—Interlake—Eastman
| Party | Candidate | Votes | % | ±% | Expenditures |
|---|---|---|---|---|---|
| Conservative | James Bezan | 25,617 | 51.9 | -14.59 | – |
| Liberal | Joanne Levy | 15,508 | 31.4 | +26.19 | – |
| New Democratic | Deborah Chief | 5,649 | 11.4 | -13.66 | – |
| Green | Wayne James | 1,707 | 3.5 | +0.03 | – |
| Libertarian | Donald L. Grant | 882 | 1.8 | +1.67 | – |
| Total valid votes/Expense limit | | 49,363 | 100.0 | | $226,474.11 |
| Total rejected ballots | | 216 | 0.30 | – | |
| Turnout | | 49,579 | 69.50 | – | |
| Eligible voters | | 71,331 | | | |
| Conservative hold | | Swing | | -20.39 | |
Source: Elections Canada

2011 Canadian federal election: Selkirk—Interlake
| Party | Candidate | Votes | % | ±% | Expenditures |
|---|---|---|---|---|---|
| Conservative | James Bezan | 26,848 | 65.2 | +4.6 | – |
| New Democratic | Sean Palsson | 10,933 | 26.5 | +1.8 | – |
| Liberal | Duncan Geisler | 1,980 | 4.8 | -3.5 | – |
| Green | Don Winstone | 1,423 | 3.5 | -2.0 | – |
| Total valid votes/Expense limit | | 41,184 | 100.0 | | – |
| Total rejected ballots | | 160 | 0.4 | -0.1 | |
| Turnout | | 41,344 | 63.9 | +5.9 | |
| Eligible voters | | 64,727 | – | – | |
| Conservative hold | | Swing | | +7.35 | |

2008 Canadian federal election: Selkirk—Interlake
| Party | Candidate | Votes | % | ±% | Expenditures |
|---|---|---|---|---|---|
| Conservative | James Bezan | 23,312 | 60.6 | +11.7 | $75,718 |
| New Democratic | Pat Cordner | 9,506 | 24.7 | -12.3 | $19,306 |
| Liberal | Kevin Walsh | 3,203 | 8.3 | -1.7 | $8,815 |
| Green | Glenda Whiteman | 2,126 | 5.5 | +2.6 | $32 |
| Christian Heritage | Jane MacDiarmid | 295 | 0.8 | +0.3 | $424 |
| Total valid votes/Expense limit | | 38,442 | 100.0 | | $99,730 |
| Total rejected ballots | | 177 | 0.5 | +0.2 | |
| Turnout | | 38,609 | 58 | -8.6 | |
| Conservative hold | | Swing | | +12.0 | |

2006 Canadian federal election: Selkirk—Interlake
| Party | Candidate | Votes | % | ±% | Expenditures |
|---|---|---|---|---|---|
| Conservative | James Bezan | 21,661 | 49.0 | +1.8 | $86,024 |
| New Democratic | Edward Schreyer | 16,358 | 37.0 | +10.5 | $56,920 |
| Liberal | Bruce Benson | 4,436 | 10.0 | -12.9 | N/A |
| Green | Thomas Goodman | 1,283 | 2.9 | +0.5 | $1,640 |
| Independent | Duncan E. Geisler | 277 | 0.6 | – | $3,516 |
| Christian Heritage | Anthony Barendregt | 204 | 0.5 | -0.4 | $5,043 |
| Total valid votes | | 44,219 | 100.0 | | – |
| Total rejected ballots | | 154 | 0.3 | -0.1 | |
| Turnout | | 44,373 | 66.6 | +7.2 | |
| Conservative hold | | Swing | | +7.35 | |

2004 Canadian federal election: Selkirk—Interlake
| Party | Candidate | Votes | % | ±% | Expenditures |
|---|---|---|---|---|---|
| Conservative | James Bezan | 18,727 | 47.2 | +2.5 | $74,351 |
| New Democratic | Duane Nicol | 10,516 | 26.5 | +6.6 | $41,939 |
| Liberal | Bruce Benson | 9,059 | 22.9 | -0.7 | $55,220 |
| Green | Trevor Farley | 982 | 2.5 | – | $716 |
| Christian Heritage | Anthony Barendregt | 353 | 0.9 | +0.5 | $10,799 |
| Total valid votes | | 39,637 | 100.0 | | – |
| Total rejected ballots | | 193 | 0.5 | +0.2 | |
| Turnout | | 39,830 | 59.4 | -7.2 | |
| Conservative hold | | Swing | | +1.6 | |
