= David Bjornson =

Canadian politician

Member of Parliament for Selkirk
- In office 1988–1993
- Preceded by: riding created
- Succeeded by: Ron Fewchuk

Personal details
- Born: 7 July 1947 (age 78) Selkirk, Manitoba
- Party: Canadian Future
- Other political affiliations: Conservative Party of Canada
- Profession: Electrician

David Bjornson (born 7 July 1947 in Selkirk, Manitoba) was a member of the House of Commons of Canada from 1988 to 1993, serving in the 34th Canadian Parliament for the Progressive Conservative party in the Selkirk riding. By career, he is an electrician.

Bjornson left federal politics after being defeated by Liberal candidate Ron Fewchuk in the 1993 federal election. Amid the Tory collapse that year, Bjornson was pushed into fourth place behind Fewchuk and the New Democratic and Reform candidates.

Bjornson expressed his support for the upstart Canadian Future Party.
