= Riding Mountain (federal electoral district) =

Federal electoral district in Manitoba, Canada

Manitoba electoral district
- Interactive map of riding boundaries. Points indicate the city of Dauphin and the towns of Swan River and Neepawa.

Federal electoral district
- Legislature: House of Commons
MP
Dan Mazier
Conservative
- District created: 2013
- First contested: 2015
- Last contested: 2025
- District webpage: profile, map

Demographics
- Population (2021): 89,503
- Electors (2025): 64,799
- Area (km²): 56,820
- Pop. density (per km²): 1.6
- Census division(s): Division No. 6, Division No. 7, Division No. 8, Division No. 15, Division No. 16, Division No. 17, Division No. 19, Division No. 20,
- Census subdivision(s): Dauphin, Portage la Prairie (part), Neepawa, Swan River, North Norfolk, WestLake-Gladstone, Roblin, North Cypress-Langford (part), Swan Valley West, Wallace-Woodworth (part)

Riding Mountain (French: Mont-Riding; formerly Dauphin—Swan River—Neepawa) is a federal electoral district in Manitoba. It encompasses a portion of Manitoba previously included in the electoral districts of Dauphin—Swan River—Marquette, Brandon—Souris and Portage—Lisgar.

Dauphin—Swan River—Neepawa was created by the 2012 federal electoral boundaries redistribution and was legally defined in the 2013 representation order. It came into effect upon the call of the 2015 Canadian federal election, which was held on October 19, 2015.

Following the 2022 Canadian federal electoral redistribution, this riding was renamed Riding Mountain at the 2025 Canadian federal election. It lost the Sioux Valley Dakota Nation plus the part of the Rural Municipality of Wallace – Woodworth that it exclaves, and the CFB Shilo area to Brandon—Souris and gained the Municipality of Norfolk Treherne and the area around Long Plain 6 from Portage—Lisgar.

== Demographics ==
Panethnic groups in Dauphin—Swan River—Neepawa (2011−2021)
Panethnic group	2021		2016		2011	
Panethnic group	Pop.	%	Pop.	%	Pop.	%
European (Note: Statistic includes all persons that did not make up part of a visible minority or an indigenous identity.)	56,230	65.5%	57,725	69.63%	61,800	73.62%
Indigenous	24,265	28.26%	21,980	26.51%	20,705	24.66%
Southeast Asian (Note: Statistic includes total responses of "Filipino" and "Southeast Asian" under visible minority section on census.)	3,785	4.41%	2,240	2.7%	580	0.69%
South Asian	460	0.54%	250	0.3%	250	0.3%
African	365	0.43%	210	0.25%	140	0.17%
East Asian (Note: Statistic includes total responses of "Chinese", "Korean", and "Japanese" under visible minority section on census.)	330	0.38%	325	0.39%	260	0.31%
Latin American	230	0.27%	85	0.1%	130	0.15%
Middle Eastern (Note: Statistic includes total responses of "West Asian" and "Arab" under visible minority section on census.)	60	0.07%	40	0.05%	50	0.06%
Other/multiracial (Note: Statistic includes total responses of "Visible minority, n.i.e." and "Multiple visible minorities" under visible minority section on census.)	130	0.15%	85	0.1%	40	0.05%
Total responses	85,850	95.92%	82,905	94.72%	83,950	96.08%
Total population	89,503	100%	87,527	100%	87,374	100%
Notes: Totals greater than 100% due to multiple origin responses. Demographics based on 2012 Canadian federal electoral redistribution riding boundaries.

According to the 2011 Canadian census

Languages: 83.5% English, 5.3% German, 3.7% Ukrainian, 2.3% Ojibway, 2.1% French
Religions: 72.0% Christian (24.4% Catholic, 20.5% United Church, 5.1% Anglican, 3.2% Lutheran, 1.9% Pentecostal, 1.9% Baptist, 1.7% Christian Orthodox, 1.2% Presbyterian, 12.3% Other), 1.9% Traditional Aboriginal Spirituality, 25.4% No religion
Median income (2010): $23,271
Average income (2010): $30,399

== Riding associations ==
Riding associations are the local branches of the national political parties:

Party	Association name	CEO	HQ address	Neighbourhood
Maverick Party	Dauphin-Swan River-Neepawa Maverick Party EDA	Daniel Bouchard,		Dauphin, Manitoba
Green		Katharine Storey	Rural Route 1	Grandview
Conservative Party of Canada	Dauphin—Swan River—Neepawa Conservative Association	Norman Sims	76 Main Street South	Minnedosa
Liberal Party of Canada	Dauphin—Swan River—Neepawa Federal Liberal Association	Crawford Halliday		Dauphin
New Democratic Party		David Rehaluk	24 Kerr Avenue	Dauphin

== Members of Parliament ==
This riding has elected the following members of the House of Commons of Canada:

Parliament	Years	Member	Party
Dauphin—Swan River—Neepawa; Riding created from Brandon—Souris; Dauphin—Swan River—Marquette and Portage—Lisgar
42nd	2015–2019	Robert Sopuck	Conservative
43rd	2019–2021	Dan Mazier	Conservative
44th	2021–2025	Dan Mazier	Conservative
Riding Mountain
45th	2025–present	Dan Mazier	Conservative

== Election results ==
Graph of election results in Dauphin—Swan River—Neepawa (minor parties that never got 2% of the vote or didn't run consistently are omitted)

=== Riding Mountain, 2023 representation order ===
2025 Canadian federal election
Party	Candidate	Votes	%	±%	Expenditures
Conservative	Dan Mazier	28,409	67.85	+8.66	
Liberal	Terry Hayward	9,281	22.16	+9.42	
New Democratic	Andrew Douglas Maxwell	3,072	7.34	-7.18	
People's	Jim Oliver	564	1.35	-9.20	
Green	Liz Clayton	547	1.31	-0.80	
Total valid votes/expense limit		41,873	99.37		
Total rejected ballots		265	0.63		
Turnout		42,138	65.03		
Eligible voters		64,799			
Conservative notional hold		Swing		-0.38	
Source: Elections Canada

2021 federal election redistributed results
Party	Vote	%
Conservative	23,165	59.19
New Democratic	5,680	14.51
Liberal	4,987	12.74
People's	4,128	10.55
Green	826	2.11
Others	351	0.90

=== Dauphin—Swan River—Neepawa, 2013 representation order ===
2021 Canadian federal election: Dauphin—Swan River—Neepawa
Party	Candidate	Votes	%	±%	Expenditures
Conservative	Dan Mazier	22,718	59.0	-5.2	$38,088.60
New Democratic	Arthur Holroyd	5,678	14.7	+0.6	$0.00
Liberal	Kevin Carlson	4,892	12.7	-0.5	$12,490.55
People's	Donnan McKenna	4,052	10.5	+8.7	$13,188.78
Green	Shirley Lambrecht	835	2.2	-3.3	$0.00
Maverick	Lori Falloon-Austin	339	0.9	N/A	$0.00
Total valid votes/expense limit		38,514	99.4	–	$129,256.28
Total rejected ballots		226	0.6		
Turnout		38,740	62.2		
Eligible voters		62,242			
Conservative hold		Swing		-2.9	
Source: Elections Canada

2019 Canadian federal election: Dauphin—Swan River—Neepawa
Party	Candidate	Votes	%	±%	Expenditures
Conservative	Dan Mazier	26,103	64.2	+17.86	$47,835.45
New Democratic	Laverne Lewycky	5,724	14.1	+1.85	none listed
Liberal	Cathy Scofield-Singh	5,344	13.2	-16.31	$10,110.34
Green	Kate Storey	2,214	5.5	+1.67	none listed
People's	Frank Godon	711	1.8	–	none listed
Christian Heritage	Jenni Johnson	470	1.2	–	none listed
Total valid votes/expense limit		40,566	100.0		–
Total rejected ballots		279	–	–	
Turnout		40,845	66.2	–	
Eligible voters		61,722			
Conservative hold		Swing		+8.01	
Source: Elections Canada

2015 Canadian federal election: Dauphin—Swan River—Neepawa
Party	Candidate	Votes	%	±%	Expenditures
Conservative	Robert Sopuck	19,276	46.34	-18.18	$96,511.06
Liberal	Ray Piché	12,276	29.51	+23.18	$30,343.94
New Democratic	Laverne Lewycky	5,097	12.25	-12.56	$18,323.29
Independent	Inky Mark	3,397	8.07	–	$7,495.11
Green	Kate Storey	1,592	3.83	-0.44	$8,600.31
Total valid votes/expense limit		41,598	100.00		$247,596.77
Total rejected ballots		160	0.38	–	
Turnout		41,758	66.09	–	
Eligible voters		63,187			
Conservative hold		Swing		-20.68	
Source: Elections Canada

2011 federal election redistributed results
Party	Vote	%
Conservative	22,213	64.52
New Democratic	8,541	24.81
Liberal	2,179	6.33
Green	1,468	4.26
Others	27	0.08

== See also ==
- List of Canadian electoral districts
- Historical federal electoral districts of Canada
