= Selkirk—Interlake—Eastman =

Federal electoral district in Manitoba, Canada

Coordinates: 51.903°N 98.437°W

Manitoba electoral district
- Interactive map of riding boundaries from the 2025 federal election. Point indicates the city of Selkirk.

Federal electoral district
- Legislature: House of Commons
MP
James Bezan
Conservative
- District created: 1996
- First contested: 1997
- Last contested: 2025
- District webpage: profile, map

Demographics
- Population (2011): 91,463
- Electors (2015): 69,587
- Area (km²): 25,824
- Pop. density (per km²): 3.5
- Census subdivision(s): St. Andrews, St. Clements, Selkirk, Rockwood, Gimli, Brokenhead, Stonewall, Alexander, Woodlands, Lac du Bonnet

Selkirk—Interlake—Eastman (formerly Selkirk—Interlake) is a federal electoral district in Manitoba, Canada, that has been represented in the House of Commons of Canada from 1976 to 1987, and since 1997.

The riding was a battleground between the New Democratic Party and conservative parties that has become more and more conservative as the years passed, and is now a safe Conservative Party seat.

== Geography ==
The riding is located generally between Lake Winnipeg and Lake Winnipegosis and includes the northern suburbs of Winnipeg and the City of Selkirk, Manitoba. In addition to Selkirk, the riding includes the communities of St. Andrews, St. Clements, Rockwood, Woodlands, Brokenhead, Stonewall, R.M. of Gimli, and the R.M. of Bifrost.

== History ==
The electoral district was originally created in 1976 from the former districts of Portage, Selkirk and Winnipeg South Centre.

It was abolished in 1987 and divided into Selkirk, Portage—Interlake, Provencher, and Churchill ridings.

It was re-created in 1996 from Selkirk—Red River, Portage—Interlake, Provencher and Churchill.

Selkirk—Interlake lost territory to Churchill—Keewatinook Aski, Provencher and Portage—Lisgar, gained territory from Provencher, and was renamed "Selkirk—Interlake—Eastman" during the 2012 electoral redistribution.

== Demographics ==
Panethnic groups in Selkirk—Interlake—Eastman (2011−2021)
Panethnic group	2021		2016		2011	
Panethnic group	Pop.	%	Pop.	%	Pop.	%
European (Note: Statistic includes all persons that did not make up part of a visible minority or an indigenous identity.)	72,125	74.37%	70,590	77.56%	71,815	81.28%
Indigenous	21,915	22.6%	18,680	20.53%	15,310	17.33%
Southeast Asian (Note: Statistic includes total responses of "Filipino" and "Southeast Asian" under visible minority section on census.)	900	0.93%	545	0.6%	255	0.29%
South Asian	840	0.87%	315	0.35%	290	0.33%
African	430	0.44%	280	0.31%	250	0.28%
East Asian (Note: Statistic includes total responses of "Chinese", "Korean", and "Japanese" under visible minority section on census.)	300	0.31%	255	0.28%	240	0.27%
Latin American	200	0.21%	105	0.12%	35	0.04%
Middle Eastern (Note: Statistic includes total responses of "West Asian" and "Arab" under visible minority section on census.)	120	0.12%	85	0.09%	35	0.04%
Other/multiracial (Note: Statistic includes total responses of "Visible minority, n.i.e." and "Multiple visible minorities" under visible minority section on census.)	160	0.16%	170	0.19%	110	0.12%
Total responses	96,985	95.67%	91,010	95.9%	88,350	96.6%
Total population	101,373	100%	94,897	100%	91,463	100%
Notes: Totals greater than 100% due to multiple origin responses. Demographics based on 2012 Canadian federal electoral redistribution riding boundaries.

According to the 2006 Canadian census

Languages: 84.11% English, 1.99% French, 13.70% Other
Religions (2001): 51.05% Protestant, 23.96% Catholic, 19.83% No religion, 3.13% Other Christian
Average income: $23,818

== Riding associations ==
Riding associations are the local branches of the national political parties:

Party	Association name	CEO	HQ address	HQ city
Christian Heritage Party of Canada	Selkirk—Interlake Christian Heritage Party Electoral District Association	Alexander Siepman	PO BOX 17 GRP 354 RR3	Winnipeg
Conservative Party of Canada	Selkirk—Interlake Conservative Association	Frank Woods	P.O. Box 171	Sandy Hook
Liberal Party of Canada	Selkirk—Interlake Federal Liberal Association	Robert E. Chamberlain	P.O. Box 131	Arnes
New Democratic Party	Selkirk—Interlake Federal NDP Riding Association	Sean Palsson	P.O. Box 1359	Arborg

== Members of Parliament ==
This riding has elected the following members of Parliament:

Parliament	Years	Member	Party
Selkirk—Interlake; Riding created from Portage, Selkirk and Winnipeg South Centre
31st	1979–1980	Terry Sargeant	New Democratic
32nd	1980–1984	Terry Sargeant	New Democratic
33rd	1984–1988	Felix Holtmann	Progressive Conservative
Riding dissolved into Selkirk, Portage—Interlake, Provencher and Churchill
Riding re-created from Selkirk—Red River, Portage—Interlake, Provencher and Churchill
36th	1997–2000	Howard Hilstrom	Reform
36th	2000–2000	Howard Hilstrom	Alliance
37th	2000–2003	Howard Hilstrom	Alliance
37th	2003–2004	Howard Hilstrom	Conservative
38th	2004–2006	James Bezan	Conservative
39th	2006–2008	James Bezan	Conservative
40th	2008–2011	James Bezan	Conservative
41st	2011–2015	James Bezan	Conservative
Selkirk—Interlake—Eastman
42nd	2015–2019	James Bezan	Conservative
43rd	2019–2021	James Bezan	Conservative
44th	2021–2025	James Bezan	Conservative
45th	2025–present	James Bezan	Conservative

=== Current member of Parliament ===
Its member of Parliament is James Bezan, a former rancher who was first elected in 2004. He is a member of the Conservative Party of Canada and has served as a member on the 'Standing Committee on Agriculture and Agri-Food'.

== Election results ==
Graph of election results in Selkirk—Interlake—Eastman (since 1997, minor parties that never got 2% of the vote or didn't run consistently are omitted)

=== Selkirk—Interlake—Eastman, 2015–present ===
2025 Canadian federal election
** Preliminary results — Not yet official **
Party	Candidate	Votes	%	±%	Expenditures
Conservative	James Bezan	32,574	60.3	+3.3	
Liberal	Rhonda Nichol	16,367	30.3	+17.1	
New Democratic	Josef Estabrooks	3,491	6.5	-12.9	
Green	Wayne James	721	1.3	-1.4	
People's	Byron Gryba	468	0.9	-6.8	
United	Chris Riddell	412	0.8	–	
Total valid votes/expense limit		54,033			
Total rejected ballots					
Turnout					
Eligible voters		76,591			
Source: Elections Canada

2021 federal election redistributed results
Party	Vote	%
Conservative	27,931	56.97
New Democratic	9,524	19.43
Liberal	6,493	13.24
People's	3,758	7.67
Green	1,320	2.69

2021 Canadian federal election
Party	Candidate	Votes	%	±%	Expenditures
Conservative	James Bezan	28,308	57.1	-5.6	$59,811.25
New Democratic	Margaret Smith	9,604	19.4	+1.5	$6,587.46
Liberal	Detlev Regelsky	6,567	13.2	+1.1	$9,990.47
People's	Ian Kathwaroon	3,800	7.7	+6.3	$2,309.10
Green	Wayne James	1,328	2.7	-3.2	$3,024.88
Total valid votes/expense limit		49,607	99.3	–	$120,770.45
Total rejected ballots		363	0.7		
Turnout		49,970	66.2		
Eligible voters		75,440			
Conservative hold		Swing		-3.6	
Source: Elections Canada

2019 Canadian federal election
Party	Candidate	Votes	%	±%	Expenditures
Conservative	James Bezan	31,109	62.7	+10.80	$53,785.73
New Democratic	Robert A. Smith	8,873	17.9	+6.46	none listed
Liberal	Detlev Regelsky	6,003	12.1	-19.32	none listed
Green	Wayne James	2,934	5.9	+5.90	none listed
People's	Ian Kathwaroon	683	1.4		$0.00
Total valid votes/expense limit		49,602	100		
Total rejected ballots		322			
Turnout		49,924	68.7		
Eligible voters		72,707			
Conservative hold		Swing		-5.68	
Source: Elections Canada

2015 Canadian federal election
Party	Candidate	Votes	%	±%	Expenditures
Conservative	James Bezan	25,617	51.90	-14.60	$96,714.11
Liberal	Joanne Levy	15,508	31.42	+26.56	$16,715.09
New Democratic	Deborah Chief	5,649	11.44	-13.61	$29,151.47
Green	Wayne James	1,707	3.46	-0.01	4,402.63
Libertarian	Donald L. Grant	882	1.79		–
Total valid votes/Expense limit		49,363	100.00		$228,041.57
Total rejected ballots		216	0.44	–	
Turnout		49,579	69.51	–	
Eligible voters		71,331			
Conservative hold		Swing		-20.58	
Source: Elections Canada

2011 federal election redistributed results
Party	Vote	%
Conservative	28,380	66.49
New Democratic	10,695	25.06
Liberal	2,072	4.85
Green	1,482	3.47
Others	54	0.13

=== Selkirk—Interlake, 1997–2015 ===
2011 Canadian federal election
Party	Candidate	Votes	%	±%	Expenditures
Conservative	James Bezan	26,848	65.2	+4.6	–
New Democratic	Sean Palsson	10,933	26.5	+1.8	–
Liberal	Duncan Geisler	1,980	4.8	-3.5	–
Green	Don Winstone	1,423	3.5	-2.0	–
Total valid votes/Expense limit		41,184	100.0		–
Total rejected ballots		160	0.4	-0.1	
Turnout		41,344	63.9	+6	
Eligible voters		64,727	–	–	

2008 Canadian federal election
Party	Candidate	Votes	%	±%	Expenditures
Conservative	James Bezan	23,312	60.6	+11.7	$75,718
New Democratic	Pat Cordner	9,506	24.7	-12.3	$19,306
Liberal	Kevin Walsh	3,203	8.3	-1.7	$8,815
Green	Glenda Whiteman	2,126	5.5	+2.6	$32
Christian Heritage	Jane MacDiarmid	295	0.8	+0.3	$424
Total valid votes/Expense limit		38,442	100.0		$99,730
Total rejected ballots		177	0.5	+0.2	
Turnout		38,609	58	-9	

2006 Canadian federal election
Party	Candidate	Votes	%	±%	Expenditures
Conservative	James Bezan	21,661	49.0	+1.8	$86,024
New Democratic	Edward Schreyer	16,358	37.0	+10.5	$56,920
Liberal	Bruce Benson	4,436	10.0	-12.9	N/A
Green	Thomas Goodman	1,283	2.9	+0.5	$1,640
Independent	Duncan E. Geisler	277	0.6	–	$3,516
Christian Heritage	Anthony Barendregt	204	0.5	-0.4	$5,043
Total valid votes		44,219	100.0		–
Total rejected ballots		154	0.3	-0.1	
Turnout		44,373	66.6	+7.2	
Conservative hold		Swing		-4	

2004 Canadian federal election
Party	Candidate	Votes	%	±%	Expenditures
Conservative	James Bezan	18,727	47.2	+2.5	$74,351
New Democratic	Duane Nicol	10,516	26.5	+6.6	$41,939
Liberal	Bruce Benson	9,059	22.9	-0.7	$55,220
Green	Trevor Farley	982	2.5	–	$716
Christian Heritage	Anthony Barendregt	353	0.9	+0.5	$10,799
Total valid votes		39,637	100.0		–
Total rejected ballots		193	0.5	+0.2	
Turnout		39,830	59.4	-7.2	

Note: Conservative vote is compared to the total of the Canadian Alliance vote and Progressive Conservative vote in 2000 election.

2000 Canadian federal election
Party	Candidate	Votes	%	±%	Expenditures
Alliance	Howard Hilstrom	17,856	43.8	+15.5	$42,070
Liberal	Kathy Arnason	9,612	23.6	-4.5	$61,425
New Democratic	Paul Pododworny	8,113	19.9	-7.9	$31,303
Progressive Conservative	Tom Goodman	4,992	12.3	-2.6	$10,949
Independent	Anthony Barendregt	178	0.4	–	$2,399
Total valid votes		40,751	100.0		–
Total rejected ballots		104	0.3	–	
Turnout		40,855	66.7	+1.2	

Note: Canadian Alliance vote is compared to the Reform vote in 1997 election.

1997 Canadian federal election
Party	Candidate	Votes	%	±%	Expenditures
Reform	Howard Hilstrom	10,937	28.3	–	$23,194
Liberal	Jon Gerrard	10,871	28.1	–	$59,732
New Democratic	Kathleen McCallum	10,749	27.8	–	$46,587
Progressive Conservative	Reid Kelner	5,730	14.8	–	$32,267
Christian Heritage	Paul Kalyniuk	363	0.9	–	$1,578
Total valid votes		38,650	100.0		–
Total rejected ballots		258	0.7		
Turnout		38,908	65.5		

=== Selkirk—Interlake, 1979–1988 ===
1984 Canadian federal election: Selkirk—Interlake
Party	Candidate	Votes	%	±%
Progressive Conservative	Felix Holtmann	13,750	40.7	+4.7
New Democratic	Terry Sargeant	13,088	38.7	-7.0
Liberal	Ed Anderson	3,510	10.4	-7.7
Confederation of Regions	Doug Stefanson	3,301	9.8	
Libertarian	Bob Quenett	163	0.5	
Total valid votes		33,812		
History of Federal Ridings since 1867: SELKIRK--INTERLAKE, Manitoba (1976 - 1987), Library of Parliament, Parliament of Canada. Retrieved 26 January 2010.

1980 Canadian federal election
Party	Candidate	Votes	%	±%
New Democratic	Terry Sargeant	15,055	45.7	+3.0
Progressive Conservative	Jon Johnson	11,847	36.0	-4.8
Liberal	Bill Shead	5,953	18.1	+1.5
Total valid votes		32,952	100.0	

1979 Canadian federal election
Party	Candidate	Votes	%
New Democratic	Terry Sargeant	14,225	42.7
Progressive Conservative	Peter P. Masniuk	13,569	40.7
Liberal	Bill Shead	5,522	16.6
Total valid votes		33,316	100.0

== See also ==
- List of Canadian electoral districts
- Historical federal electoral districts of Canada
