= Howard Hilstrom =

Canadian politician, rancher and police officer

Member of Parliament for Selkirk—Interlake
- In office 2 June 1997 – 28 June 2004
- Preceded by: riding reconstituted
- Succeeded by: James Bezan

Personal details
- Born: Howard E. Hilstrom; 18 March 1947 (age 79) Estevan, Saskatchewan, Canada
- Party: Reform Party of Canada; Canadian Alliance; Conservative Party of Canada
- Profession: Law enforcement, rancher

Howard E. Hilstrom (born 18 March 1947) is a former Canadian politician, rancher and police officer. Hilstrom served as a member of the House of Commons of Canada from 1997 to 2004. His career has included ranching and law enforcement.

He was elected in the Selkirk—Interlake electoral district under the Reform Party of Canada in the 1997 general election. He was re-elected in 2000 as the party changed names from the Canadian Alliance to the Conservative Party of Canada. He served in the 36th and 37th Canadian Parliaments. He served on parliamentary committees relating to agriculture during his terms of office.

Hilstrom left office in 2004 as he did not contest Selkirk—Interlake again. James Bezan, also of the Conservative Party, succeeded Hilstrom in the House of Commons.
