= Selkirk—Red River =

Selkirk—Red River (formerly known as Selkirk) was a federal electoral district in Manitoba, Canada, that was represented in the House of Commons of Canada from 1988 to 1997.

The riding was created as "Selkirk" riding in 1987 from Selkirk—Interlake, Winnipeg North and Winnipeg—Birds Hill ridings. It was renamed "Selkirk—Red River" in 1990. Selkirk—Red River consisted of part of the city of Winnipeg and an area to the east of that city. The electoral district was abolished in 1996 when it was re-distributed between Churchill, Provencher, Selkirk—Interlake, and Winnipeg North—St. Paul ridings.

== Electoral history ==
1988 Canadian federal election
| Party | Candidate | Votes |
|---|---|---|
| Progressive Conservative | David Bjornson | 17,813 |
| New Democratic | Howard Pawley | 13,899 |
| Liberal | Peter Sanderson | 12,451 |
| Christian Heritage | Karl H. Felsen | 1,172 |
| Reform | Terrance Petty | 595 |
| Confederation of Regions | Ron Bowers | 364 |
| Rhinoceros | Wowie Zowie Zubek | 335 |
| Independent | Eugene Klochko | 58 |

1993 Canadian federal election
| Party | Candidate | Votes |
|---|---|---|
| Liberal | Ron Fewchuk | 16,031 |
| New Democratic | Jason E. Schreyer | 12,532 |
| Reform | Terry Lewis | 12,392 |
| Progressive Conservative | David Bjornson | 5,688 |
| National | Jim Slobodzian | 1,395 |
| Christian Heritage | Eric Truijen | 399 |
| Natural Law | Rose Marie Papetti | 177 |
| Canada Party | Ken Carver | 79 |

== See also ==
- List of Canadian electoral districts
- Historical federal electoral districts of Canada
