= Ron Fewchuk =

Canadian politician

Member of Parliament for Selkirk—Red River
- In office October 25, 1993 – June 2, 1997
- Preceded by: David Bjornson
- Succeeded by: riding dissolved

Personal details
- Born: October 28, 1941 Selkirk, Manitoba
- Died: September 13, 2017 (aged 75) Selkirk, Manitoba
- Party: Liberal
- Spouse: June (née Parks) (m. 1960–2017)
- Children: Rodney (Nan) and Kathy (Bruce)
- Profession: Businessperson

Ron Fewchuk (28 October 1941–13 September 2017; both in Selkirk, Manitoba) was a member of the House of Commons of Canada from 1993 to 1997 at the Selkirk—Red River electoral district. He was a businessperson by career.

Fewchuk was a member of the Liberal party who served in the 35th Canadian Parliament. He did not seek a second term in office and left Canadian politics after the 1997 federal election.
