= Dauphin—Swan River—Marquette =

Former federal electoral district in Manitoba, Canada

Coordinates: 51.686°N 100.349°W

Manitoba electoral district
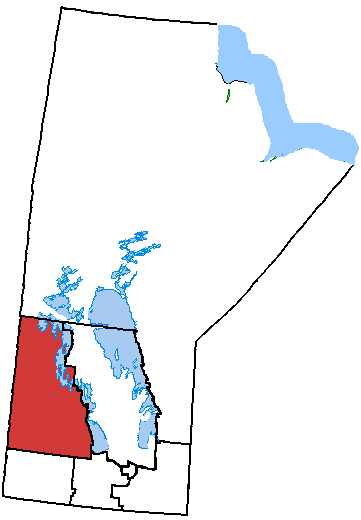
- Dauphin–Swan River–Marquette in relation to other Manitoba federal electoral districts

Defunct federal electoral district
- Legislature: House of Commons
- District created: 1903
- District abolished: 2013
- First contested: 1904
- Last contested: 2011
- District webpage: profile, map

Demographics
- Population (2011): 74,800
- Electors (2011): 53,549
- Area (km²): 46,493.79
- Census division(s): 8, 15, 16, 17, 19, 20
- Census subdivision(s): Dauphin, Swan River, Neepawa, Sandy Bay, Minnedosa

Dauphin—Swan River—Marquette (formerly known as Dauphin and Dauphin—Swan River) was a federal electoral district in Manitoba, Canada, that was represented in the House of Commons of Canada from 1904 to 2015. Its population in 2011 was 74,800. The riding became known as Dauphin—Swan River—Neepawa for the 2015 federal election.

== Demographics ==
According to the 2011 Canadian census

Languages: 83% English, 2.03% French, 14.97% Other

According to the 2006 Canadian census

Racial groups: 75.02% White, 24.21% Aboriginal
Average income: $16,388
Religions (2001): 47.30% Protestant, 32.18% Catholic, 14.45% Non religious, 3.27% Christian Orthodox, 1.99% Other Christian

== Riding associations ==
Riding associations are the local branches of the national political parties:

Party	Association name	CEO	HQ address	Neighbourhood
Green	Dauphin—Swan River—Marquette Federal Green Party Association	Katharine Storey	Rural Route 1	Grandview
Conservative Party of Canada	Dauphin—Swan River—Marquette Conservative Association	Norman Sims	76 Main Street South	Minnedosa
Liberal Party of Canada	Dauphin—Swan River—Marquette Federal Liberal Association	Lorna Liddle	PO Box 2568	Neepawa
New Democratic Party	Dauphin—Swan River—Marquette Federal NDP Riding Association	David Rehaluk	24 Kerr Avenue	Dauphin

== Geography ==
The riding was located in between southern and central Manitoba, west of Lake Winnipegosis and Lake Manitoba.

== History ==
The electoral district was created as "Dauphin" riding in 1903 from Macdonald, Marquette and Saskatchewan (Provisional District) ridings.

In 1983, it was renamed "Dauphin–Swan River".

In 2004, it was renamed "Dauphin–Swan River–Marquette".

=== Members of Parliament ===
The riding elected the following members of Parliament:

Parliament	Years	Member	Party
Dauphin; Riding created from Macdonald, Marquette and Saskatchewan provisional district
10th	1904–1908	Theodore Arthur Burrows	Liberal
11th	1908–1911	Glenlyon Campbell	Conservative
12th	1911–1917	Robert Cruise	Liberal
13th	1917–1921	Robert Cruise	Government (Unionist)
14th	1921–1925	William John Ward	Progressive
15th	1925–1926	William John Ward	Progressive
16th	1926–1930	William John Ward	Liberal–Progressive
17th	1930–1935	James Langstaff Bowman	Conservative
18th	1935–1940	William John Ward	Liberal
19th	1940–1945	William John Ward	Liberal
20th	1945–1949	Fred Zaplitny	Co-operative Commonwealth
21st	1949–1953	William John Ward	Liberal
22nd	1953–1957	Fred Zaplitny	Co-operative Commonwealth
23rd	1957–1958	Fred Zaplitny	Co-operative Commonwealth
24th	1958–1962	Elmer Forbes	Progressive Conservative
25th	1962–1963	Elmer Forbes	Progressive Conservative
26th	1963–1965	Elmer Forbes	Progressive Conservative
27th	1965–1968	Elmer Forbes	Progressive Conservative
28th	1968–1972	Gordon Ritchie	Progressive Conservative
29th	1972–1974	Gordon Ritchie	Progressive Conservative
30th	1974–1979	Gordon Ritchie	Progressive Conservative
31st	1979–1980	Gordon Ritchie	Progressive Conservative
32nd	1980–1984	Laverne Lewycky	New Democratic
Dauphin—Swan River
33rd	1984–1988	Brian White	Progressive Conservative
34th	1988–1993	Brian White	Progressive Conservative
35th	1993–1997	Marlene Cowling	Liberal
36th	1997–2000	Inky Mark	Reform
36th	2000–2000	Inky Mark	Alliance
37th	2000–2002	Inky Mark	Alliance
37th	2002–2004	Inky Mark	Progressive Conservative
Dauphin—Swan River—Marquette
38th	2004–2006	Inky Mark	Conservative
39th	2006–2008	Inky Mark	Conservative
40th	2008–2010	Inky Mark	Conservative
40th	2010–2011	Robert Sopuck	Conservative
41st	2011–2015	Robert Sopuck	Conservative
Riding dissolved into Dauphin—Swan River—Neepawa

=== Last member of Parliament ===
The seat was last held by Robert Sopuck, a fisheries biologist. When the riding became known as Dauphin—Swan River—Neepawa, Sopuck handily won the election.

== Election results ==
Dauphin—Swan-River—Marquette was a conservative riding for much of the last half-century of its existence. It was held by the Liberals from 1993 to 1997, with that party's sweeping victory in the 1993 general election. The only other time that it was not represented by a centre-right party after 1958 was from 1980 to 1984, when it was held by the NDP.

=== Dauphin—Swan River—Marquette, 2004–2015 ===
2011 Canadian federal election
Party	Candidate	Votes	%	±%	Expenditures
Conservative	Robert Sopuck	18,543	63.09	+6.60	–
New Democratic	Cheryl Osborne	7,657	26.05	-0.40	–
Liberal	Wendy Menzies	1,947	6.62	-3.70	–
Green	Kate Storey	1,243	4.23	-1.39	–
Total valid votes/Expense limit		29,390	100.00		–
Total rejected ballots		92	0.31	-0.12	
Turnout		29,482	55.69	+29.07	
Eligible voters		52,941	–	–	
Conservative hold		Swing		+3.5	

2010 by-election

Canadian federal by-election, November 29, 2010
Party	Candidate	Votes	%	±%	Expenditures
Conservative	Robert Sopuck	8,034	56.49	-4.87	–
New Democratic	Denise Harder	3,762	26.45	+9.82	–
Liberal	Christopher Scott Sarna	1,468	10.32	-3.65	–
Green	Kate Storey	799	5.62	-0.89	–
Christian Heritage	Jerome Dondo	159	1.12	-0.08	–
Total valid votes/Expense limit		14,222	100.00		–
Total rejected ballots		61	0.43	+0.07	
Turnout		14,283	26.62	-28	
Eligible voters		53,660	–	–	
Conservative hold		Swing		-7.13	
By-election due to the resignation of Inky Mark.

2008 Canadian federal election
Party	Candidate	Votes	%	±%	Expenditures
Conservative	Inky Mark	18,132	61.36	+2.28	$42,460
New Democratic	Ron Strynadka	4,914	16.63	-1.67	$5,103
Liberal	Wendy Menzies	4,128	13.97	-4.18	$22,590
Green	Kate Storey	1,923	6.51	+2.84	
Christian Heritage	David Andres	356	1.20	+0.40	
People's Political Power	Charles Prefontaine	96	0.32	–	$1,294
Total valid votes/Expense limit		29,549	100.00		$95,083
Total rejected ballots		107	0.36	-0.09	
Turnout		29,656	55	–	
Conservative hold		Swing		+2.0	

2006 Canadian federal election
Party	Candidate	Votes	%	±%	Expenditures
Conservative	Inky Mark	20,084	59.08	+5.13	$42,115
New Democratic	Walter Kolisnyk	6,221	18.30	-3.67	$21,849
Liberal	Don Dewar	6,171	18.15	-2.23	$19,220
Green	Kathy Storey	1,246	3.67	+1.66	$2,759
Christian Heritage	Iris Yawney	273	0.80	-0.88	$920
Total valid votes		33,995	100.00		
Total rejected ballots		154	0.45	-0.05	
Turnout		34,149	62	–	
Conservative hold		Swing		+4.4	

=== Dauphin—Swan River, 1983–2004 ===
2004 Canadian federal election
Party	Candidate	Votes	%	±%	Expenditures
Conservative	Inky Mark	18,025	53.95	-5.57^	$45,456
New Democratic	Walter Kolisnyk	7,341	21.97	+4.50	$41,153
Liberal	Don Dewar	6,809	20.38	-0.94	$31,775
Green	Lindy Clubb	673	2.01	–	$593
Christian Heritage	David Andres	560	1.68	–	$2,974
Total valid votes		33,408	100.00		
Total rejected ballots		168	0.50	+0.06	
Turnout		33,576	58.6	-4.9	
Conservative hold		Swing		-5.0	

^ Change is from the total of Progressive Conservative and Canadian Alliance votes in the 2000 election.

2000 Canadian federal election
Party	Candidate	Votes	%	±%	Expenditures
Alliance	Inky Mark	15,855	47.66	+12.17	$30,460
Liberal	Jane Dawson	7,091	21.32	+0.57	$32,160
New Democratic	Wayne Kines	5,813	17.47	-3.75	$24,855
Progressive Conservative	Keith Eliasson	3,946	11.86	-9.76	$3,345
Canadian Action	Terry Drul	372	1.12	–	$3,068
Independent	Iris Yawney	189	0.57	–	$5,508
Total valid votes		33,266	100.00		
Total rejected ballots		148	0.44	+0.10	
Turnout		33,414	63.5	-1.9	
Alliance hold		Swing		+5.8	

Note: Canadian Alliance vote is compared to Reform Party vote in 1997 election.

1997 Canadian federal election
Party	Candidate	Votes	%	±%	Expenditures
Reform	Inky Mark	12,668	35.49	+5.96	$32,650
Progressive Conservative	Lorne Boguski	7,716	21.62	+5.85	$50,353
New Democratic	Betty Findlay	7,575	21.22	-0.97	$48,818
Liberal	Marlene Cowling	7,408	20.75	-10.98	$44,417
Independent	Tony Riley	326	0.91	+0.13	$2,130
Total valid votes		35,693	100.00		
Total rejected ballots		122	0.34	–	
Turnout		35,815	65.4	–	
Reform gain from Liberal		Swing		-8.5	

1993 Canadian federal election
Party	Candidate	Votes	%	±%
Liberal	Marlene Cowling	10,600	31.73	+12.10
Reform	Dale Brown	9,865	29.53	+26.13
New Democratic	Stan Struthers	7,412	22.19	-11.20
Progressive Conservative	Bill Galloway	5,267	15.77	-25.60
Canada Party	Tony Riley	260	0.78	
Total valid votes		33,404	100.00	
Liberal gain from Progressive Conservative		Swing	-18.85	

1988 Canadian federal election
Party	Candidate	Votes	%	±%
Progressive Conservative	Brian White	14,719	41.37	-1.19
New Democratic	Eric Irwin	11,881	33.39	-2.93
Liberal	Alain Bouchard	6,985	19.63	+4.16
Reform	Peter J. Neufeld	1,209	3.40	
Confederation of Regions	Joseph Hagyard	394	1.11	-4.54
Independent	Terry Drul	393	1.10	
Total valid votes		35,581	100.00	

1984 Canadian federal election
Party	Candidate	Votes	%	±%
Progressive Conservative	Brian White	11,973	42.56	+4.1
New Democratic	Laverne Lewycky	10,219	36.32	-8.5
Liberal	Doug Cowling	4,352	15.47	-1.3
Confederation of Regions	Douglas Switzer	1,589	5.65	
Total valid votes		28,133	100.0	

=== Dauphin, 1904–1983 ===
1980 Canadian federal election
Party	Candidate	Votes	%	±%
New Democratic	Laverne Lewycky	12,960	44.8	+3.2
Progressive Conservative	Orville Heschuk	11,116	38.4	-4.8
Liberal	Ron Hale	4,849	16.8	+1.5
Total valid votes		28,925	100.0	

1979 Canadian federal election
Party	Candidate	Votes	%	±%
Progressive Conservative	Gordon Ritchie	12,239	43.2	-3.5
New Democratic	Laverne Lewycky	11,770	41.6	+9.9
Liberal	Robert Klimchuk	4,311	15.2	-6.4
Total valid votes		28,320	100.0	

1974 Canadian federal election
Party	Candidate	Votes	%	±%
Progressive Conservative	Gordon Ritchie	11,439	46.7	-7.7
New Democratic	Laverne Lewycky	7,743	31.6	+4.7
Liberal	Ronald Hale	5,300	21.6	+3.0
Total valid votes		24,482	100.0	

1972 Canadian federal election
Party	Candidate	Votes	%	±%
Progressive Conservative	Gordon Ritchie	12,584	54.4	+17.2
New Democratic	Bernhard Dirauf	6,234	27.0	-1.8
Liberal	Ferdinand A. Guiboche	4,305	18.6	-10.3
Total valid votes		23,123	100.0	

1968 Canadian federal election
Party	Candidate	Votes	%	±%
Progressive Conservative	Gordon Ritchie	8,701	37.2	-2.8
Liberal	Raymond-J. Allard	6,770	28.9	+4.0
New Democratic	Evelyn Syme	6,737	28.8	+9.2
Social Credit	Dean Whiteway	1,194	5.1	-10.5
Total valid votes		23,402	100.0	

1965 Canadian federal election
Party	Candidate	Votes	%	±%
Progressive Conservative	Elmer Forbes	6,545	39.9	-3.0
Liberal	Siggi Sigurdson	4,082	24.9	-6.6
New Democratic	John Zaplitny	3,202	19.5	+13.0
Social Credit	Lawrence A. Milner	2,558	15.6	-3.4
Total valid votes		16,387	100.0	

1963 Canadian federal election
Party	Candidate	Votes	%	±%
Progressive Conservative	Elmer Forbes	7,541	43.0	+3.3
Liberal	Siggi T. Sigurdson	5,526	31.5	+5.9
Social Credit	Lawrence A. Milner	3,334	19.0	+9.8
New Democratic	Ray Taylor	1,148	6.5	-19.0
Total valid votes		17,549	100.0	

1962 Canadian federal election
Party	Candidate	Votes	%	±%
Progressive Conservative	Elmer Forbes	7,158	39.6	-6.8
Liberal	Sigurdur Thorberg Sigurdson	4,620	25.6	+4.3
New Democratic	Fred Zaplitny	4,619	25.6	-6.7
Social Credit	Lawrence A. Milner	1,665	9.2	
Total valid votes		18,062	100.0	

Note: NDP vote is compared to CCF vote in 1958 election.

1958 Canadian federal election
Party	Candidate	Votes	%	±%
Progressive Conservative	Elmer Forbes	8,674	46.4	+25.8
Co-operative Commonwealth	Fred Zaplitny	6,023	32.2	-7.6
Liberal	A. Thomas Warnock	3,981	21.3	+4.1
Total valid votes		18,678	100.0	

1957 Canadian federal election
Party	Candidate	Votes	%	±%
Co-operative Commonwealth	Fred Zaplitny	6,706	39.9	-3.1
Progressive Conservative	W. Gordon Ritchie	3,463	20.6	+7.2
Liberal	Alfred Hallam Parker	2,896	17.2	-14.6
Social Credit	Sherman S. Hunt	2,442	14.5	+2.8
Independent Liberal	William John Ward	1,304	7.8	
Total valid votes		16,811	100.0	

1953 Canadian federal election
Party	Candidate	Votes	%	±%
Co-operative Commonwealth	Fred Zaplitny	6,839	43.0	+2.6
Liberal	Alfred Hallam Parker	5,050	31.8	-13.3
Progressive Conservative	R. Elmer Forbes	2,136	13.4	-1.1
Social Credit	Sherman Stanley Hunt	1,866	11.7	
Total valid votes		15,891	100.0	

1949 Canadian federal election
Party	Candidate	Votes	%	±%
Liberal	William John Ward	7,896	45.1	+11.2
Co-operative Commonwealth	Fred Zaplitny	7,089	40.4	+2.4
Progressive Conservative	Michael F. Szewczyk	2,541	14.5	-13.6
Total valid votes		17,526	100.0	

1945 Canadian federal election
Party	Candidate	Votes	%	±%
Co-operative Commonwealth	Fred Zaplitny	6,226	38.0	+7.8
Liberal	William John Ward	5,550	33.9	-1.1
Progressive Conservative	George Craig Dowler	4,599	28.1	-6.6
Total valid votes		16,375	100.0	

1940 Canadian federal election
Party	Candidate	Votes	%	±%
Liberal	William John Ward	5,953	35.0	-11.5
National Government	James Langstaff Bowman	5,900	34.7	-2.2
Co-operative Commonwealth	Ronald S. Moore	5,142	30.3	+13.8
Total valid votes		16,995	100.0	

1935 Canadian federal election
Party	Candidate	Votes	%	±%
Liberal	William John Ward	7,091	46.6	-0.9
Conservative	James Langstaff Bowman	5,628	37.0	-15.6
Co-operative Commonwealth	Robert Arthur D. McKellar	2,508	16.5	
Total valid votes		15,227	100.0	

1930 Canadian federal election
Party	Candidate	Votes	%	±%
Conservative	James Langstaff Bowman	7,083	52.5	+9.4
Liberal–Progressive	William John Ward	6,399	47.5	-9.4
Total valid votes		13,482	100.0	

1926 Canadian federal election
Party	Candidate	Votes	%	±%
Liberal–Progressive	William John Ward	7,260	56.9	+5.8
Conservative	James Langstaff Bowman	5,502	43.1	-5.8
Total valid votes		12,762	100.0	

1925 Canadian federal election
Party	Candidate	Votes	%	±%
Progressive	William John Ward	5,102	51.1	-27.3
Conservative	James Langstaff Bowman	4,883	48.9	+27.3
Total valid votes		9,985	100.0	

1921 Canadian federal election
Party	Candidate	Votes	%
Progressive	William John Ward	7,779	78.4
Conservative	Robert Cruise	2,138	21.6
Total valid votes		9,917	100.0

1917 Canadian federal election
Party	Candidate	Votes
Government (Unionist)	Robert Cruise	acclaimed

1911 Canadian federal election
Party	Candidate	Votes	%	±%
Liberal	Robert Cruise	3,674	55.7	+7.4
Conservative	Glenlyon Archibald Campbell	2,926	44.3	-7.4
Total valid votes		6,600	100.0	

1908 Canadian federal election
Party	Candidate	Votes	%
Conservative	Glenlyon Archibald Campbell	3,206	51.8
Liberal	Theodore Arthur Burrows	2,989	48.2
Total valid votes		6,195	100.0

1904 Canadian federal election
Party	Candidate	Votes
Liberal	Theodore Arthur Burrows	acclaimed

== See also ==
- Swan River (electoral district)
- Dauphin, Manitoba
- Swan River, Manitoba
- Neepawa, Manitoba
- Minnedosa, Manitoba
- List of Canadian electoral districts
- Historical federal electoral districts of Canada
