= Brian White (Canadian politician) =

Canadian politician

Brian White (born 17 January 1951 in Winnipeg, Manitoba) was a Progressive Conservative party member of the House of Commons of Canada. He is a pharmacist by career.

He represented the Manitoba riding of Dauphin—Swan River where he was first elected in the 1984 federal election and re-elected in 1988, therefore becoming a member in the 33rd and 34th Canadian Parliaments.

White left federal politics in 1993 and did not campaign for a third term in the Legislature.

== Electoral results ==
1988 Canadian federal election
| Party | Candidate | Votes | % | ±% |
|---|---|---|---|---|
| Progressive Conservative | Brian White | 14,719 | 41.37 | -1.19 |
| New Democratic | Eric Irwin | 11,881 | 33.39 | -2.93 |
| Liberal | Alain Bouchard | 6,985 | 19.63 | +4.16 |
| Reform | Peter J. Neufeld | 1,209 | 3.40 | |
| Confederation of Regions | Joseph Hagyard | 394 | 1.11 | -4.54 |
| Independent | Terry Drul | 393 | 1.10 | |
| Total valid votes | | 35,581 | 100.00 | |

1984 Canadian federal election
| Party | Candidate | Votes | % | ±% |
|---|---|---|---|---|
| Progressive Conservative | Brian White | 11,973 | 42.56 | +4.1 |
| New Democratic | Laverne Lewycky | 10,219 | 36.32 | -8.5 |
| Liberal | Doug Cowling | 4,352 | 15.47 | -1.3 |
| Confederation of Regions | Douglas Switzer | 1,589 | 5.65 | |
| Total valid votes | | 28,133 | 100.0 | |
