= People's Political Power Party of Canada =

People's Political Power Party of Canada Pouvoir Politique du Peuple du Canada
- Former federal party
- Leader: Anna-Maria Everett
- President: Shirley Roulette
- Founded: 2006
- Dissolved: April 13, 2011
- Ideology: Christian democracy
- Colours: Red, pink, yellow

Website
- www.peoplespoliticalpower.ca

The People’s Political Power Party of Canada (PPP; French: Pouvoir Politique du Peuple du Canada) was a fringe Canadian federal political party that is no longer recognized by Elections Canada. The party became eligible for registration on April 26, 2006, and was deregistered on April 13, 2011, for failing to nominate a candidate for the 2011 federal election. The party's last leader was Anna-Maria Everett, and its national headquarters is in Winnipeg, Manitoba.

According to its party platform, the party is neither socialist nor capitalistic; instead, it is a "Centre party to first bring value as top priority to woman, the mother, mothers to-be, mothers that were." The party further intends to "remove" poverty, promises that "Canada will never become a military zone," and that it "will bring back the seventh day as a family day". In terms of environmental issues, the party believes that "there is no reason for over population, much less of poverty. When you bring respect for women in the family, you have all these problems resolved, abortion and all."

The party had registered two candidates for the 2008 federal election. Neither were elected.

== Election results ==
Election	# of candidates	# of votes	% of popular vote	% in ridings contested
2008	2	189	0.00%	0.36%

== See also ==
- List of political parties in Canada
- Poverty in Canada
