= Municipal elections in Manitoba =

Elections in the Canadian province

This page has a list of all municipal elections in Manitoba.

- 1977 Manitoba municipal elections
- 1980 Manitoba municipal elections
- 1983 Manitoba municipal elections
- 1986 Manitoba municipal elections
- 1989 Manitoba municipal elections
- 1992 Manitoba municipal elections
- 1995 Manitoba municipal elections
- 1998 Manitoba municipal elections
- 2002 Manitoba municipal elections
- 2006 Manitoba municipal elections
- 2010 Manitoba municipal elections
- 2014 Manitoba municipal elections
- 2018 Manitoba municipal elections
- 2022 Manitoba municipal elections
- 2026 Manitoba municipal elections

== See also ==
- Municipal elections in Canada
