= Progressive Conservative Party of Manitoba candidates in the 1995 Manitoba provincial election =

The Progressive Conservative Party of Manitoba fielded a full slate of 57 candidates in the 1995 provincial election. Thirty-one of these candidates were elected, giving the party its second consecutive majority government. Many candidates have their own biography pages; information about others may be found here.

== Burrows: Bill McGee ==
McGee is from Beausejour, Manitoba, and has been a self-employed construction contractor. He received 1,266 votes (17.99%), finishing second against New Democratic Party incumbent Doug Martindale. He was hired to set up a regional health authority after the election, and was a board member of the North Eastman Health Association in 2000-01.

== Elmwood: Clayton McMurren ==
McMurren is a small businessman and a former councillor in Rockwood, a rural municipality located outside of Winnipeg. He was first elected in 1989, and served until 2002. In 2006, he was elected as a councillor in Pinawa.

In 1995, McMurren proposed that Winnipeg's municipal government should rehabilitate quarry lands for the 1999 Pan-American Games, and then turn the site over to Rockwood (which would not contribute to the total costs). The Winnipeg councillors who handled the proposal were described as "far from impressed".

In addition to running for the provincial legislature in 1995, McMurren also sought the Progressive Conservative Party of Canada's nomination for Selkirk—Interlake in the 1997 federal election. He finished third against Reid Kelner; Felix Holtmann placed second. He later served on the board of Ensis Management, Inc., the Manitoba Film Classification Board, Community Futures Winnipeg River and Triathlon Manitoba.

Electoral record
Election	Division	Party	Votes	%	Place	Winner
1989 municipal, Rockwood	Councillor, Ward One	n/a	not listed	not listed	not listed	himself
1992 municipal, Rockwood	Councillor, Ward One	n/a	not listed	not listed	not listed	himself
1995 municipal, Rockwood	Councillor, Ward One	n/a	426	58.84	1/3	himself
1995 provincial	Elmwood	Progressive Conservative	2,552	31.73	2/3	Jim Maloway, New Democratic Party
1998 municipal, Rockwood	Councillor, Ward One	n/a	241	?	1/?	himself
2006 municipal, Pinawa	Councillor	n/a	619	23.46	1/6	himself, Karla Elcock, Lynn Patterson and Lloyd Rattai

== Point Douglas: Claire Riddle ==
Riddle was born to a Métis family in Eddystone, Manitoba, and has been an active member of the Manitoba Métis Federation (MMF) for many years. She served as vice-president of the MMF's Winnipeg Region from 1986 to 1993, and has been a director for the region since that time. She was re-elected to a third term in office in 2000. Riddle is the chair for Métis Rights and the Métis Nation Agenda within the MMF, and is the Manitoba representative at the Métis Rights Panel of the Métis National Council. She has also worked with the MMF Unemployment Insurance Commission and for the Canadian Aboriginal Economic Development Strategy. As of 2005, she works with the Residential Tenancies Office of the province of Manitoba.

Riddle received 578 votes (11.77%) in 1995, finishing third against New Democratic Party incumbent George Hickes.

== Rupertsland: Eric Kennedy ==
Kennedy was born in Princess Harbour on Lake Winnipeg. He began his political career at the municipal level, serving as Mayor of Long Body Creek and president of the Northern Association of Community Councils. Kennedy took the MACC out of debt within one year of becoming its leader. He is an aboriginal Canadian, and has long been active in drawing attention to aboriginal issues.

He first campaigned for the Manitoba legislature in a by-election to replace Elijah Harper, held on September 21, 1993. He received 614 votes, finishing third against New Democrat Eric Robinson. He again placed third against Robinson in 1995, receiving 619 votes (13.98%). Kennedy has been critical of both the Progressive Conservatives and the New Democratic Party in their handling of northern affairs in Manitoba.

In June 2005, Kennedy was appointed to manage the Pauingassi First Nation office of Southeast Child and Family Services. Since taking this position, he has become prominent in drawing attention to solvent abuse among young children, and has proposed an outreach program to the federal and provincial governments.

== Transcona: Richard Bueckert ==
Bueckert is a small businessman in Winnipeg, and has been co-owner of Randonne Tours Ltd. He received 2,372 votes (26.71%), finishing second against New Democratic Party candidate Daryl Reid.

== Wellington: Steve Place ==
Steve Place received 1,226 votes (17.49%), finishing third against New Democratic Party incumbent Becky Barrett. The President of the Manitoba Historical Society from 2002 to 2004 was named Steve Place; this may be the same person.
