= Desjarlais =

Desjarlais is a Canadian surname. Notable people with the surname include:

- Bev Desjarlais (1955–2018), Canadian politician
- Blake Desjarlais (born 1993), Canadian politician
- Bob Desjarlais (1954–2021), Canadian trade unionist
- Drew Desjarlais (born 1997), Canadian gridiron football player
- Harley Desjarlais, regional Métis leader in Canada
- Jason DesJarlais, American football player, coach and scout
- Robert Desjarlais (1907–1987), Canadian fencer
- Scott DesJarlais (born 1964), American politician and physician

== Surname ==
- Desjarlais, Alberta, a locality in Canada
