= 1995 Manitoba municipal elections =

The 1995 Manitoba municipal elections were held on October 25, 1995 to elect mayors, councillors and school trustees in various communities throughout Manitoba, Canada.

== Cities ==
=== Brandon ===
1995 Brandon municipal election: Mayor of Brandon
Candidate	Votes	%
(x)Rick Borotsik	11,299	80.17
Stephen Downes	1,620	11.49
Geoff Borden	1,175	8.34
Total votes cast	14,094	100.00

1995 Brandon municipal election, Councillor, Ward One (Assiniboine)

Candidate	Total votes	% of total votes
(incumbent)Joe Kay	acclaimed	n/a

1995 Brandon municipal election: Councillor, Ward Two
Candidate	Votes	%
(x)Drew Caldwell	735	64.19
Barbara Bragg	353	30.83
Darryl Wolski	57	4.98
Total valid votes	1,145	100.00

- Barbara Bragg is founder and president of The Learning Company, a training centre that teaches students various aspects of computer technology. In 2002, she won a Contribution to Community Award. As of 2007, she serves on the Brandon University Animal Care Committee. She had previously served on Brandon's Board of Governors ini the 1990s, resigning in 1997. Bragg campaigned for the Rosser Ward (Ward Two) a second time in a 1999 by-election, losing to Marion Robinsong. Her husband, Marty Snelling, was the Progressive Conservative candidate for Brandon East in the 1999 provincial election.

1995 Brandon municipal election, Councillor, Ward Three (Victoria)

Candidate	Total votes	% of total votes
(incumbent)Don Kille	1329	63.71
Ron Cayer	757	36.29
Total valid votes	2086	100.00

1995 Brandon municipal election, Councillor, Ward Four (University)

Candidate	Total votes	% of total votes
Rick Chrest	699	54.35
(incumbent)Brian Deacon	587	45.65
Total valid votes	1286	100.00

1995 Brandon municipal election, Councillor, Ward Five (Meadows)

Candidate	Total votes	% of total votes
Laurie MacKenzie	943	66.08
Bob Crighton	484	33.92
Total valid votes	1427	100.00

1995 Brandon municipal election, Councillor, Ward Six (South Centre)

Candidate	Total votes	% of total votes
(incumbent)Jim Reid	acclaimed	n/a

1995 Brandon municipal election: Councillor, Ward Seven
Candidate	Votes	%
Scott Smith	1,350	66.34
(x)Romeo Lemieux	685	33.66
Total valid votes	2,035	100.00

- Romeo Lemieux represented Ward Seven on the Brandon City Council from 1992 to 1995.

1995 Brandon municipal election, Councillor, Ward Eight (Richmond)

Candidate	Total votes	% of total votes
(incumbent)Margo Campbell	1006	66.05
Marv Robinson	517	33.95
Total valid votes	1523	100.00

1995, Brandon municipal election, Councillor, Ward Nine (Riverview)

Candidate	Total votes	% of total votes
(incumbent)Ross Martin	577	47.41
Bill Comstock	355	29.17
Lorne Hill	285	23.42
Total valid votes	1217	100.00

1995 Brandon municipal election, Councillor, Ward Ten (Green Acres)

Candidate	Total votes	% of total votes
Don Jessiman	616	60.40
Peter Logan	204	20.00
(incumbent)Arnold Grambo	200	19.60
Total valid votes	1020	100.00

- Arnold Grambo served four terms on Brandon City Council from 1983 to 1995.

==== post-election changes ====
Mayor Rick Borotsik resigned his position in 1997, after being elected to the House of Commons of Canada. A by-election was held to choose his replacement.

Brandon, Manitoba municipal by-election, September 24, 1997: Mayor of Brandon
Candidate	Votes	%
Reg Atkinson	elected	-
Dan Munroe	about 200 votes behind	-
Scott Smith	about 400 votes behind	-
Geoff Borden		-
three other candidates	not listed	-

- Dan Munroe was a former city councillor. He was elected to represent the city's seventh ward in 1983 or earlier, and served until 1992.

=== Winnipeg ===
See: 1995 Winnipeg municipal election

== Rural Municipalities ==
=== Rockwood ===
1995 Rockwood municipal election, Reeve
Candidate	Total votes	% of total votes
(incumbent)Leon Vandekerckhove	accl.	not listed

1995 Rockwood municipal election, Council, Ward One
Candidate	Total votes	% of total votes
(incumbent)Clayton McMurren	426	58.84
Tom Huffman	177	24.45
Ted Demeniuk	121	16.71
Total valid votes	724	100.00

1995 Rockwood municipal election, Council, Ward Two
Candidate	Total votes	% of total votes
(incumbent)Gordon Appleyard	accl.	.

1995 Rockwood municipal election, Council, Ward Three
Candidate	Total votes	% of total votes
(incumbent)Garnet Thievin	372	83.41
Dean Reid	74	16.59
Total valid votes	446	100.00

1995 Rockwood municipal election, Council, Ward Four
Candidate	Total votes	% of total votes
Ken Hibbitt	146	55.09
(incumbent)Bill Docking	102	38.49
Doug Holmes	17	6.42
Total valid votes	265	100.00

1995 Rockwood municipal election, Council, Ward Five
Candidate	Total votes	% of total votes
(incumbent)Gilbert Good	accl.	.

1995 Rockwood municipal election, Council, Ward Six
Candidate	Total votes	% of total votes
(incumbent)Alex Glowachuk	174	56.31
Jeff Tomchak	135	43.69
Total valid votes	309	100.00

== Towns ==
=== Hartney ===
1995 Hartney municipal election, Mayor of Hartney
Candidate	Total votes	% of total votes
(incumbent)Leo Peloquin	accl.	.

- Leo Peloquin was Mayor of Hartney from 1989 to 1998, and presided over a period of relative economic growth for the town. He did not seek re-election in 1998. He had previously served on council from 1986 to 1989. Peloquin is the father of professional wrestler Chi Chi Cruz.

=== Neepawa ===
1995 Neepawa municipal election, Mayor of Neepawa
Candidate	Total votes	% of total votes
Roy McGillivray	accl.	.

- Roy McGillivray was first elected as Mayor of Neepawa in 1992, defeating incumbent mayor Homer Gill by a two-to-one margin. He was appointed to the provincial building standards board, and was re-elected to the mayoralty without opposition in 1995. In 1996, he encouraged the construction of an Agro-Enviro Centre to support the local farm industry. He did not seek re-election in 1998. In 1999, he was appointed to a task force that assessed flooding damage to businesses in western and southwestern Manitoba. He was critical of Ken Waddell, his successor as mayor, accusing him of "mixing religion with politics".

== Villages ==
=== Waskada ===
1995 Waskada municipal election, Mayor of Waskada
Candidate	Total votes	% of total votes
(incumbent)Vaughn Ramsay	accl.	.

1995 Waskada municipal election, Waskada Village Council (four members elected)
Candidate	Total votes	% of total votes
John Innes	accl.	.
Terry Bradco	accl.	.
Dellene Heath	accl.	.
Tom Rickard	accl.	.

Source: Winnipeg Free Press newspaper, 27 October 1995.
