= Dave Burgess (politician) =

Canadian politician (born c. 1959)

30th Mayor of Brandon, Manitoba
- In office October 23, 2002 – November 9, 2010
- Preceded by: Reg Atkinson
- Succeeded by: Shari Decter Hirst

Personal details
- Born: c. 1959 Brandon, Manitoba Canada
- Education: University of Manitoba (BCom)

David K. Burgess (born c. 1959) is a Canadian politician in Brandon, Manitoba, who was mayor of the city from 2002 to 2010. His father, Ken Burgess, was Mayor of Brandon from 1979 to 1989.

== Early life and career ==
Burgess was born as raised in Brandon. He has a Bachelor of Commerce degree from the University of Manitoba, and operated a family meat-packing business before entering political life. He was first elected to the Brandon City Council in 1998, easily defeating two other candidates in the city's sixth ward. He was appointed to the board of the centre Keystone Centre, and spearheaded a movement to upgrade the facility's services.

Burgess was initially an ally of Mayor Reg Atkinson, although their political relationship deteriorated in early 2002. Burgess broke from Atkinson to support a casino for Brandon, and also opposed a municipal smoking ban that Atkinson favoured.

== Mayor of Brandon ==
Burgess won a surprisingly easy victory over former provincial cabinet minister James McCrae in the 2002 municipal election to succeed Atkinson as Mayor of Brandon. After the election, Burgess announced that he would support a province-wide smoking ban to remove what he called an "unlevel playing field" between Brandon and the surrounding communities. He also tried to relax Brandon's strict anti-smoking law in early 2003, but was unsuccessful.

In March 2003, Burgess entered into negotiations with Maple Leaf Pork regarding the use of high-membrane technology to cut water pollution from the firm's large Brandon plant. He wrote a public letter in support of a second shift for Maple Leaf's facility in September of the same year, arguing that it would create good jobs and be beneficial to the city.

Burgess opposes the principle of urban reserves, arguing that they create uneven market opportunities for business owners of different racial backgrounds. In 2004, Burgess presided over the arrival of the Princess Patricia's Canadian Light Infantry to their new station in Brandon.

Burgess has presided over a period of economic growth for the City of Brandon. The 2001 Canadian census showed the city's population as 43,000; Burgess has argued that its population may grow to 50,000 by 2008. In 2005, he called for a more centralized coordination of services between he city and surrounding communities.

Burgess is a less charismatic and more conciliatory politician than Reg Atkinson, his predecessor as mayor. He was re-elected with around 60% support in 2006.

He was defeated by Shari Decter Hirst in the 2010 municipal election.

== Provincial politics ==
Burgess is a supporter of the Progressive Conservative Party of Manitoba.
