= Progressive Conservative Party of Canada candidates in the 1997 Canadian federal election =

The Progressive Conservative Party of Canada ran a full slate of candidates in the 1997 federal election, and won 20 seats out of 301 to emerge as the fifth largest party in the House of Commons of Canada. Many of the party's candidates have their own biography pages; information about others may be found here.

== Quebec ==
=== Claude Boulard (Brome—Missisquoi) ===
Claude Boulard (died 7 June 2003) was a radio and television personality. He was the founder of the radio station CIMO-FM in Magog, which he sold to Radiomutuel in 1986. He also helped promote JoJo Savard, a television astrologist who attracted national media notoriety in the 1990s. Boulard's links to Savard became an issue in the 1997 campaign; Pierre Foglia of La Presse described him as a "king of fools" who should not have been allowed to run for a credible political party. Boulard defended his work as a professional host and said there was nothing illegal about Savard's business. He received 12,770 votes (28.09%), finishing second against Liberal Party incumbent Denis Paradis.

He died at age sixty-eight in 2003, after a battle with fibrosis and lung cancer.

=== Anie Perrault (Joliette) ===
Anie Perrault is a lawyer, politician, and communications specialist in Quebec. She practised law in Montreal from 1992 to 1995; was national director of communications and public affairs for Canada's Research-Based Pharmaceutical Companies (Rx&D) from 1999 to 2001; and was vice president, communications for Genome Canada from 2001 to 2004. She became president of Communications Anie Perrault in 2006.

Perrault was president of the Young Progressive Conservatives of Quebec in the early 1990s. She was a special advisor to Jean Charest on three occasions between 1989 and 1997, including during the 1995 Quebec referendum on sovereignty. She later worked as a special advisor to Peter MacKay (1997) and press attachée and senior advisor to Joe Clark (1998–99). Perrault herself ran for the Canadian House of Commons as a Progressive Conservative candidate in 1997 and placed a credible second against the Bloc Québécois incumbent in Joliette.

She moved to Bromont in 2003 and was elected to a seat on the city's council in 2009.

Electoral record
Election	Division	Party	Votes	%	Place	Winner
1997 federal	Joliette	Progressive Conservative	17,417	35.86	2/5	René Laurin, Bloc Québécois
2009 Bromont municipal	City Council, Ward Six	n/a	214	50.23	1/3	herself

=== Yves Schelling (Richelieu) ===
Yves Schelling was a foreman in Bécancour. In the early 1990s, he served as an assistant to Liberal Member of the National Assembly Maurice Richard. He received 6,827 votes (14.16%), finishing third against Bloc Québécois incumbent Louis Plamondon.

== Ontario ==
=== Gregg Crealock (St. Catharines) ===
Crealock graduated from the Sheridan College high school equivalency program in 1974. He worked as assistant manager of markets for the Royal Bank of Canada from 1982 to 1985, and was a senior manager with the Bank of Nova Scotia from 1985 to 1988. In 1986, he opened the family-owned Plain & Fancy Restaurant. Crealock was chair of the St. Catharines Chamber of Commerce in the 1990s.

Crealock received 6,503 votes (13.41%), finishing third against Liberal candidate Walt Lastewka. He was 40 years old in 1997 (Globe and Mail, 16 April 1997).

=== Brian McCutcheon (Scarborough Southwest) ===
McCutcheon was born on 25 May 1967. He received a Bachelor's Degree from the University of Waterloo in 1991, and a Bachelor of Laws degree from Osgoode Hall Law School in 1995. He has worked as an engineer and computer consultant, and was a lawyer in Toronto at the time of the election. If elected, he promised to work to establish a parental responsibility act (Toronto Star, 30 May 1997).

McCutcheon received 5,294 votes (13.67%), finishing third against Liberal incumbent Tom Wappel.

=== Angie Tomasic (Stoney Creek) ===
Tomasic was born in northern Greece on 15 September 1961, and moved to Hamilton with her family when she was two years old (Hamilton Spectator, 18 May 1996). She began working as a bank manager in 1984, and had become a senior assistant branch manager with Royal Bank by the mid-1990s. She was also a part-time student at McMaster University in this period, working toward a Bachelor of Arts degree (Hamilton Spectator, 27 May 1995).

Tomasic unsuccessfully campaigned for Hamilton's public school board in 1988 and 1991, and ran for the Progressive Conservative Party of Ontario in the 1995 provincial election. She endorsed welfare reform and the abolition of affirmative action programs (Hamilton Spectator, 19 May 1995) in the 1995 provincial election, and was credited with running a stronger campaign than expected. She finished a credible third in Hamilton Centre, where the Progressive Conservatives have not historically polled well.

In 1996, Tomasic was chosen as the federal Progressive Conservative candidate for a Hamilton East by-election against Liberal cabinet minister Sheila Copps. Former party leader Joe Clark campaigned with her in the city (Spectator, 11 June 1996). She placed third, behind both Copps and a New Democratic Party candidate.

She won the party's nomination for Stoney Creek in 1997, and finished in third place against Liberal Tony Valeri.

Electoral record
Election	Division	Party	Votes	%	Place	Winner
1995 provincial	Hamilton Centre	PC	5,723	26.30	3/5	David Christopherson, New Democratic Party
federal by-election, 17 June 1996	Hamilton East	PC	3,662	13.76	3/13	Sheila Copps, Liberal
1997 federal	Stoney Creek	PC	9,440		3/6	Tony Valeri, Liberal

=== Bill Lee (Sudbury) ===
Bill Lee has a Bachelor of Arts degree in Psychology (1984) and an honour's degree in Social Work (1991) from Laurentian University. He was a teaching master at Ontario Business College from 1992 to 1994, and was later a director of Northern Ontario Family Counselling Services. He received 3,459 votes (8.63%), finishing fourth against Liberal incumbent Diane Marleau. He later served as president of the Manitoulin-North Shore Navy Veterans Association.

=== Stephen Probyn (Toronto Centre—Rosedale) ===
Probyn was born on 14 May 1951. He received a Bachelor of Arts degree from Queen's University in 1973, and later received a Master of Public Administration from the Kennedy School of Government at Harvard University. He was a policy adviser to Nova Scotia Premier John Buchanan in 1983, and served as a senior policy adviser to the Canadian Minister Energy, Mines and Resources from 1984 to 1986. He established Probyn & Company in 1994 to fund energy projects, and is a member of the Metro Board of Trade and the Albany Club. He has written in defense of the Monarchy in Canada in the national media (Globe and Mail, 4 October 2000).

He emphasized tax cuts in the 1997 campaign (Toronto Star, 30 May 1997), and received 8,993 votes (19.28%) to finish third against Liberal incumbent Bill Graham.

Probyn supported deregulation policies while working for the government of Brian Mulroney in the 1980s (Globe and Mail, 13 May 1986), and continued to endorse energy deregulation throughout the 1990s (Financial Post, 17 February 1992 and 19 August 1997). In 1997, his firm was involved in the first public-private partnership in Canadian water management in Dartmouth, Nova Scotia (Financial Post, 23 March 1996). He served on a Market Design Committee established by the provincial Progressive Conservative government of Mike Harris to provide the guidelines for deregulation in Ontario's energy sector (Hamilton Spectator, 22 April 2002).

Probyn was a prominent figure on Bay Street, Canada's financial centre. In 2004, he advocated a Customs Union with the United States of America. He was chairman of the Canadian Association of Income Funds (CAIF) (National Post, 24 November 2005) and president and CEO of the Clean Power Income Fund, which he founded to promote environmentally sound energy sources (Globe and Mail, 24 November 2005). He supported federal Finance Minister Ralph Goodale's financial update in November 2005.

=== Frank Snyder (Whitby—Ajax) ===
Snyder (born 23 November 1958) is a Civil Engineering graduate from the University of Waterloo. He founded Snyder Construction in 1982, and was still its owner and operator at the time of the 1997 election. He was defeated for the federal Progressive Conservative nomination in Oshawa for the 1984 election, and for the provincial Progressive Conservative nomination for Durham Centre (Toronto Star, 23 December 1986) in the 1987 election.

He won the Ontario PC nomination for Oshawa in the 1987 campaign, and finished third against New Democratic Party incumbent Mike Breaugh. Snyder ran on a platform of spending cuts, and also criticized pay equity policies, the provincial welfare system, rent control and public automobile insurance (Toronto Star, 1 September 1987).

He received 10,107 votes (20.47%) in the 1997 election, finishing third against Liberal candidate Judi Longfield.

== Manitoba ==
=== Don Knight (Churchill) ===
Knight is a lawyer and former Royal Canadian Mounted Police (RCMP) officer (Winnipeg Free Press, 3 September 1993). He ran for the Progressive Conservative Party on two occasions.

An individual named Don Knight was listed as a member of the Manitoba Human Rights Commission in 1998 (WFP, 20 January 1998) and as a crown attorney by 2005 (WFP, 29 September 2005). It is likely that this is the same person.

Electoral record
Election	Division	Party	Votes	%	Place	Winner
1993 federal	Churchill	PC	2,438		3/5	Elijah Harper, Liberal
1997 federal	Churchill	PC	2,452	10.50	4/4	Bev Desjarlais, New Democratic Party

=== Clare Braun (Provencher) ===
Clare Braun is a minister and municipal politician. He was the co-owner of Clare's Family Restaurant in Niverville and had spent ten years in church ministry at the time of the 1997 campaign. He was elected as the mayor of Niverville in 1995, and was returned without opposition in 1998. Braun ran a "family values" campaign in 1997, stressing his opposition to euthanasia, abortion, and "same-sex legislation", while also opposing the national firearms registry.

Braun opposed the province's efforts to reform Niverville's council voting system in 1996, and favoured the existing model where the mayor only votes in the event of a tie. In 2001, he presided over a municipal referendum that legalized the sale of alcohol for the first time in the community's history. He did not seek re-election in 2002. As of 2006, Braun was an agent with Sutton-Kilkenny Real Estate.

Electoral record
Election	Division	Party	Votes	%	Place	Winner
1995 municipal	Mayor of Niverville	n/a	not listed	–	not listed	himself
1997 federal	Churchill	Progressive Conservative	5,955	16.32	3/4	David Iftody, Liberal
1998 municipal	Mayor of Niverville	n/a	accl.	–	1/1	himself

=== Reid Kelner (Selkirk—Interlake) ===
Kelner is the owner of the Winnipeg Beach Hotel, and was a trustee for the Evergreen School Division at the time of the 1997 election. He won his party's nomination by a single vote over former Member of Parliament Felix Holtmann; local councillor Clay McMurren was also a candidate. In the general election, he finished fourth against Reform Party candidate Howard Hilstrom.

In January 1998, Kelner announced his appeal of the Manitoba Lottery Commission's decision to remove video lottery terminals from his hotel. The ban was introduced after the commission discovered that patrons had withdrawn game money from debit cards; one patron had committed suicide after losing his life savings in this manner. Kelner maintained that staff were unaware of how the money had been used, and argued that the machines were necessary to ensure the financial viability of his hotel. The VLTs were returned in March 1998. During the course of the controversy, Kelner required that employees at his hotel take courses in recognizing gambling addiction.

Kelner was elected Mayor of Winnipeg Beach in 1998, running on a platform of reducing taxes by amalgamating services with neighbouring communities. Later in the year, he was appointed to a public advisory group studying shoreline erosion on Lake Winnipeg. In 2001, he supported plans to construct a seniors' residence and tourist hotel in the community. He did not seek re-election in 2002.

Kelner supported Brian Pallister's bid for the Progressive Conservative Party leadership in 1998. He serves on the Manitoba Hotel Association's board of directors for the 2007–08 year, and is a Manitoba representative on the executive board of the Hotel Association of Canada.

Electoral record
Election	Division	Party	Votes	%	Place	Winner
1995 municipal, Evergreen School Division	school trustee	n/a	not listed	not listed	not listed	himself, and others
1997 federal	Selkirk—Interlake	Progressive Conservative	5,730	14.83	4/5	Howard Hilstrom, Reform
1998 municipal, Winnipeg Beach	mayor	n/a	600		1/2	himself

=== Campbell Alexander (Winnipeg Centre) ===
Alexander was listed in a 1993 newspaper report the sales representative of a local plumbing company. He was forty-one years old and self-employed during the 1997 election, working on retraining programs for recipients of social assistance and unemployment insurance (Winnipeg Free Press, 17 May 1997). Later in 1997, he was listed as manager of a business partnership for the Taking Charge program (WFP, 10 November 1997).

Alexander appears to have endorsed Kim Campbell for the Progressive Conservative Party leadership in 1993, insofar as attended a breakfast address delivered by Campbell in Winnipeg before the party's leadership race officially started, and commented that she brought a "fresh new perspective on to the scene" (WFP, 21 March 1993). In the same year, he wrote an editorial piece defending the funding cutbacks initiated by provincial Education Minister Rosemary Vodrey (WFP, 10 July 1993). In 1994, he supported Vodrey's proposed reforms of the Young Offenders Act.

Alexander received 2,442 votes (9.10%) in the 1997 election, finishing fourth against New Democratic Party candidate Pat Martin. He later served as chief executive officer of the Progressive Conservative Party of Manitoba, although he left this position in March 2003 amid financial difficulties within the party (WFP, 6 April 2003).

=== William (Bill) Mackness (Winnipeg South) ===
Mackness (born 28 April 1938) is a retired business economist and academic administrator. He holds a Bachelor of Science degree in Chemistry from the Université de Montréal, and a Master's Degree in Economics from the University of Western Ontario. He served as senior vice-president and chief economist for the Bank of Nova Scotia (Globe and Mail, 6 May 1983), was a senior advisor to the federal Department of Finance, and was a Canadian representative to the Organisation for Economic Co-operation and Development (OECD) and the International Monetary Fund (IMF).

Mackness is a trustee of the economically conservative Fraser Institute. In 1991, he delivered an address before the institute entitled, "Big government and the constitutional crisis", encouraging both spending cuts and a devolution of power to the provinces.

Mackness served as Dean of Management at the University of Manitoba from 1988 to 1995, and affiliated the department with the Fraser Institute. He became known for an abrasive management style, with one rival faculty member claiming he had created an "environment of hatred" at the department (Winnipeg Free Press, 17 March 1995). He was also accused of intolerance in 1990 after mailing an internal letter on departmental renewal which included the line, "If we don't do something soon, we will all retire together and leave the place to Third World mathematicians" (Winnipeg Free Press, 1 September 1990). His contract was not renewed in 1995, and his successor severed the department's affiliation with the Fraser Institute the following year.

He received 6,547 votes (17.26%) in 1997, finishing third against Liberal incumbent Reg Alcock. In 1999, Mackness was the author of another Fraser Institute document calling for spending cuts and tax cuts.

Mackness was a supporter of the Canada-United States Free Trade Agreement in 1987 (Globe and Mail, 5 October 1987), and endorsed the proposed Multilateral Agreement on Investment ten years later (Winnipeg Free Press, 5 January 1998).

=== Glenn Buffie (Winnipeg—Transcona) ===
Buffie was born on 30 January 1960. He was a sale manager at the time of the election, and had served as president of the Progressive Conservative Party of Manitoba. He was the chair of Paul Murphy's campaign in the 1995 provincial election. He received 2,968 votes (8.97%), finishing fourth against New Democratic Party incumbent Bill Blaikie. He later became AA vice-president for the Winnipeg Minor Hockey Association.

== Saskatchewan ==
=== Ron Meakin (Wanuskewin) ===
Meakin is a farmer and real estate broker (Saskatoon Star-Phoenix, 17 May 1997). He had previously campaigned for the Progressive Conservative Party of Saskatchewan. In the 1997 election, he called for tax cuts and the cancellation of the Canadian gun registry (Saskatoon Star-Phoenix, 1 May 1997).

Electoral record
Election	Division	Party	Votes	%	Place	Winner
1995 provincial	Redberry	P.C.	2,133		3/3	Walter Jess, New Democratic Party
1997 federal	Wanuskewin	P.C.	2,602	7.93	4/6	Maurice Vellacott, Reform
