= Kevin McGarry =

Kevin McGarry may refer to:

- Kevin McGarry (footballer)
- Kevin McGarry (American football)
- Kevin McGarry (actor)
