= Ken Burgess =

Canadian politician

Kenneth John Burgess (January 5, 1928 – September 10, 2005) was a politician in Manitoba, Canada. He is the longest-serving mayor of Brandon, Manitoba, having held the position from 1979 to 1989.

Burgess was chair of the Brandon school board in the late 1960s. He ran for the Legislative Assembly of Manitoba in the 1973 municipal election as a candidate of the Progressive Conservative Party, and was defeated by New Democratic Party incumbent Leonard Evans in the division of Brandon East.

Burgess was first elected Mayor of Brandon in a 1979 by-election. He was returned by acclamation in 1980, and was re-elected in 1983 and 1986. Burgess was often involved in disagreements with the federal government over the subsidy for Brandon's airport.

He was defeated by challenger Rick Borotsik in 1989. During this campaign, both of his opponents argued that he lacked the leadership skills to run Brandon in an effective manner.
