= Brian McCutcheon =

Brian McCutcheon may refer to:

- Brian McCutcheon (politician), Progressive Conservative Party candidate in the 1997 Canadian federal election
- Brian McCutcheon (ice hockey) (born 1949), Canadian professional ice hockey player
