= Shari Decter Hirst =

Canadian politician

31st Mayor of Brandon
- In office November 9, 2010 – November 6, 2014
- Preceded by: Dave Burgess
- Succeeded by: Rick Chrest

Shari Decter Hirst is a Canadian politician, who was elected mayor of Brandon, Manitoba, in the 2010 municipal election and is the first female mayor in Brandon City Council history. She was formally sworn into office on November 9, 2010. She was defeated by Rick Chrest in the 2014 municipal election. Decter Hirst previously ran as a New Democratic Party of Manitoba candidate in Brandon West in the 1990 provincial election, losing to incumbent MLA James McCrae.
