= Manitoba Liberal Party candidates in the 1981 Manitoba provincial election =

The Manitoba Liberal Party fielded 39 candidates in the 1981 provincial election, none of whom were elected. This was the first time since party politics were introduced to Manitoba that the Liberal Party did not win any representation in a general election.

== Margaret Workman (Brandon East) ==
Workman was born in Deloraine in 1924, and later moved to Brandon where she worked for the Manitoba Telephone System. She was elected to the Brandon City Council in 1974, and was re-elected in 1977 and 1980 before standing down to look over her gravely ill spouse. In addition to her bid for provincial office in 1981, she made an unsuccessful attempt to become Mayor of Brandon in 1989. She was Glen McKinnon's campaign manager in the 1997 federal election. She died in 2006.

Electoral record
Election	Division	Party	Votes	%	Place	Winner
1974 municipal	Brandon City Council, Ward Six	n/a	515		1/3	herself
1977 municipal	Brandon City Council, Ward Six	n/a	413		1/2	herself
1980 municipal	Brandon City Council, Ward Six	n/a	not listed		not listed	herself
1981 provincial	Brandon East	Liberal	512		3/3	Leonard Evans, New Democratic Party
1989 municipal	Mayor of Brandon	n/a	<1,800		3/3	Rick Borotsik
