= 1977 Manitoba municipal elections =

The 1977 Manitoba municipal elections were held in October 1977 to elect mayors, councillors and school trustees in various communities throughout Manitoba, Canada.

== Cities ==
=== Brandon ===
1977 Brandon municipal election: Councillor, Ward Three
Candidate	Votes	%
Rick Borotsik	704	40.91
Jonathan Robin Toogood	508	29.52
(x)Paul Hudy	404	23.47
Lew Heming	105	6.10
Total votes cast	1,721	100.00

- Jonathan Robin Toogood appears to have been a first-time candidate.
- Paul Edward Hudy is an insurance executive. He was elected to the Brandon City Council in 1974 for Victoria Ward, and was defeated in 1977. He strongly criticized the federal government of Brian Mulroney in 1987.
- Lew Heming appears to have been a first-time candidate.

== Towns ==
=== Hartney ===
1977 Hartney municipal election, Mayor of Hartney
Candidate	Total votes	% of total votes
Allan Lougheed	174	60.42
(incumbent)Allen Moffat	114	39.58
Total votes cast	288	100.00

- Allan Lougheed appears to have served as Mayor of Hartney until either 1980 or 1981, when he was replaced by Reg Atkinson. There is a councillor named Allan Lougheed in the nearby Rural Municipality of Whitewater as of 2007, although this may not be the same person.
