= 2018 Manitoba municipal elections =

Municipal elections were held in the Canadian province of Manitoba on October 24, 2018. Mayors, councils and school board trustees were elected.

Selected mayoral and council results are as follows:

== Brandon ==
Results for the city of Brandon are as follows:

=== Mayor ===
Mayoral candidate	Vote	%
Rick Chrest (X)	Acclaimed	

=== Brandon City Council ===
Candidate	Vote	%
Assiniboine
Jeff Fawcett (X)	751	86.42
Jeff Plas	118	13.58
Rosser
Kris Desjarlais (X)	309	68.97
Glen Kruck	139	31.03
Victoria
Barry Cullen (X)	474	67.81
James Montgomery	225	32.19
University
Shaun Cameron	546	62.54
Karen Peto	327	37.46
Meadows-Waverly
John LoRegio (X)	393	73.73
Gordon McRae	140	26.27
South Centre
Bruce Luebke	348	70.73
Nick Brown	144	29.27
Linden Lanes
Shawn Berry (X)	Acclaimed	
Richmond
Ron W. Brown (X)	384	50.39
Ron Cayer	378	49.61
Riverview
Glen Parker (X)	382	58.86
Brock McEwing	267	41.14
Green Acres
Jan Chaboyer (X)	Acclaimed	

=== By-election ===
A by-election was held in Meadows-Waverly Ward on May 5, 2021, to replace John LoRegio who resigned in March 2021. Sunday Frangi was elected, and is believed to be the first Black Canadian councillor in Manitoba's history. Also of note was that the turnout was just 2.6%.

Results

Candidate	Vote	%
Sunday Frangi	50	54.35
Gordon McRae	42	45.65

== Brokenhead ==
Results for reeve in the Rural Municipality of Brokenhead are as follows:

=== Reeve ===
Reeve candidate	Vote	%
Brad Saluk (X)	959	66.74
Fred Mills	478	33.26

== Dauphin ==
Results for mayor in Dauphin are as follows:

=== Mayor ===
Mayoral candidate	Vote	%
Allen Dowhan (X)	Acclaimed	

== East St. Paul ==
Results for mayor in the Rural Municipality of East St. Paul are as follows:

=== Mayor ===
Mayoral candidate	Vote	%
Shelley Hart (X)	Acclaimed	

== Flin Flon ==
Results for mayor in Flin Flon are as follows:

=== Mayor ===
Mayoral candidate	Vote	%
Cal Huntley (X)	Acclaimed	

== Gimli ==
Results for mayor in the Rural Municipality of Gimli are as follows:

=== Mayor ===
Mayoral candidate	Vote	%
Lynn Greenberg	1,365	43.67
D. J. Sigmundson	1,140	36.47
Randy Woroniuk (X)	621	19.87

== Hanover ==
Results for reeve in the Rural Municipality of Hanover are as follows:

=== Reeve ===
Reeve candidate	Vote	%
Stan Toews (X)	Acclaimed	

== La Broquerie ==
Results for reeve in the Rural Municipality of La Broquerie are as follows:

=== Reeve ===
Reeve candidate	Vote	%
Lewis Weiss (X)	844	56.15
Cameron Peters	659	43.85

== Macdonald ==
Results for reeve in the Rural Municipality of Macdonald are as follows:

=== Reeve ===
Reeve candidate	Vote	%
Bradley Erb (X)	Acclaimed	

== Morden ==
Results for mayor in Morden are as follows:

=== Mayor ===
Mayoral candidate	Vote	%
Brandon Burley	1,334	49.17
Karla Warkentin	1,112	40.99
Ron McClain	267	9.84

== Portage la Prairie (city) ==
Results for mayor in the city of Portage la Prairie are as follows:

=== Mayor ===
Mayoral candidate	Vote	%
Irvine A. Ferris (X)	1,962	60.41
Erik Lee	1,286	39.59

== Portage la Prairie (RM) ==
Results for reeve in the Rural Municipality of Portage la Prairie are as follows:

=== Reeve ===
Reeve candidate	Vote	%
Kameron Blight (X)	Acclaimed	

== Rhineland ==
Results for reeve in the Municipality of Rhineland are as follows:

=== Mayor ===
Reeve candidate	Vote	%
Don Wiebe (X)	Acclaimed	

== Ritchot ==
Results for mayor in the Rural Municipality of Ritchot are as follows:

=== Mayor ===
Mayoral candidate	Vote	%
Chris Ewen (X)	Acclaimed	

== Rockwood ==
Results for reeve in the Rural Municipality of Rockwood are as follows:

=== Reeve ===
Reeve candidate	Vote	%
J. Wesley Taplin	809	38.03
Mark Hidlebaugh	738	34.70
Ila Buchanan	560	26.33
John Frig	20	0.94

== Selkirk ==
Results for mayor in Selkirk are as follows:

=== Mayor ===
Mayoral candidate	Vote	%
Larry Johannson (X)	2,242	79.73
Teresa Macumber	312	11.10
Ian Kathwaroon	258	9.17

== Springfield ==
Results for reeve in the Rural Municipality of Springfield are as follows:

=== Reeve ===
Reeve candidate	Vote	%
Tiffany Fell	2,569	45.46
Vince Bennici	1,098	19.43
Bob Bodnaruk (X)	1,065	18.85
Ken Lucko	919	16.26

== St. Andrews ==
Results for mayor in the Rural Municipality of St. Andrews are as follows:

=== Mayor ===
Mayoral candidate	Vote	%
Joy Sul	2,401	61.82
George Pike (X)	1,094	28.17
Ian Tesarski	389	10.02

== Stanley ==
Results for reeve in the Rural Municipality of Stanley are as follows:

=== Reeve ===
Reeve candidate	Vote	%
Morris Olafson (X)	Acclaimed	

== St. Clements ==
Results for mayor in the Rural Municipality of St. Clements are as follows:

=== Mayor ===
Mayoral candidate	Vote	%
Debbie Fielbelkorn (X)	1,387	42.33
Rob Morrisey	1,126	34.34
Scott Hillhouse	764	23.31

== Ste. Anne (RM) ==
Results for reeve in the Rural Municipality of Ste. Anne are as follows:

=== Reeve ===
Reeve candidate	Vote	%
Paul Saindon	388	32.36
Don Morin	279	23.27
Shirley Hiebert	270	22.52
Robert Desautels	262	21.85

== Steinbach ==
Results for mayor in the city of Steinbach are as follows:

=== Mayor ===
Mayoral candidate	Vote	%
Earl Funk	2,343	42.99
Paul Neustaedter	1,861	34.15
John Fehr	1,246	22.86

== Taché ==
Results for mayor in the Rural Municipality of Taché are as follows:

=== Mayor ===
Mayoral candidate	Vote	%
Justin Denis Bohémier	1,450	51.67
Robert Rivard (X)	1,356	48.33

== The Pas ==
Results for mayor in the town of The Pas are as follows:

=== Mayor ===
Mayoral candidate	Vote	%
Herb Jaques	603	40.04
Johanna McLauchlan	388	25.76
Brian Roque	285	18.92
Jim Scott (X)	230	15.27

== Thompson ==
Results in Thompson were as follows:

=== Mayor ===
2018 Mayor
Mayoral candidate	Vote	%
Colleen Smook	1,223	44.15
Ron Matechuk	959	34.62
Penny Byer	519	18.74
Ryan Brady	69	2.49

=== City Council ===
Councillors At Large (8 Total)
Mayoral candidate	Vote	%
Les Ellsworth	1,484	8.87
Kathy Valentino	1,351	8.07
Jeff Fountain	1,244	7.44
Brian Lundmark	1,222	7.30
Earl Colbourne	1,087	6.50
Duncan Wong	1,037	6.20
Judy Kolada	1,036	6.19
TO BE DETERMINED (Tie)		
Chiew Chong	1,008	6.02
André Proulx	1,008	6.02
Blake Ellis	885	5.29
Adey Adeyemi	855	5.11
Bryan Young	848	5.07
Serena Puranen	794	4.75
Malanie Cutler	737	4.40
Paul Beck	635	3.80
Rita Werstroh	485	2.90
Tim Gibson	361	2.16
Martin Grier	280	1.67
Godfrey Buhagiar	232	1.39
Dave Tugwood	142	0.85

== West St. Paul ==
Results for mayor in the Rural Municipality of West St. Paul are as follows:

=== Mayor ===
Mayoral candidate	Vote	%
Cheryl Christian	1,528	57.83
Bruce Henley (X)	1,114	42.17

== Winkler ==
Results for mayor in the city of Winkler are as follows:

=== Mayor ===
Mayoral candidate	Vote	%
Martin Harder (X)	Acclaimed	

== Winnipeg ==
Results of the mayoral election by ward.

Results of the mayoral election by polling subdivision.

Results in Winnipeg were as follows:

=== Mayor ===
Candidate	Vote	%
Brian Bowman (X)	114,222	53.30
Jenny Motkaluk	76,554	35.72
Tim Diack	10,548	4.92
Don Woodstock	4,738	2.21
Doug Wilson	3,527	1.65
Umar Hayat	2,229	1.04
Ed Ackerman	1,697	0.79
Venkat Machiraju	788	0.37

=== City Council ===
Results for Winnipeg City Council were as follows:

Charleswood-Tuxedo
Candidate	Votes	%
Kevin Klein	7,403	41.87
Grant Nordman	5,922	33.50
Kevin Nichols	2,690	15.22
Ken St. George	1,664	9.41

Daniel McIntyre
Candidate	Votes	%
Cindy Gilroy (X)	6,396	56.97
Josh Brandon	4,592	40.91
Sarowar Miah	238	2.12

Elmwood-East Kildonan
Candidate	Votes	%
Jason Schreyer (X)	6,171	54.78
Robb Massey	5,095	45.22

Fort Rouge-East Fort Garry
Candidate	Votes	%
Sherri Rollins	5,349	36.92
Jeff Palmer	4,783	33.01
Stephanie Meilleur	1,783	12.31
Peter Koroma	871	6.01
Michael Thompson	793	5.47
Bryanna Spina	700	4.83
Harry Wolbert	209	1.44

Mynarski
Candidate	Votes	%
Ross Eadie (X)	6,854	65.93
Michael Wiens	1,792	17.24
Greg Littlejohn	1,373	13.21
Dave Capar	377	3.63

North Kildonan
Candidate	Votes	%
Jeff Browaty (X)	12,796	77.17
Andrew Podolecki	3,786	22.83

Old Kildonan
Candidate	Votes	%
Devi Sharma (X)	6,923	57.10
Kaur Sidhu	2,862	23.61
Bradley Gross	2,339	19.29

Point Douglas
Candidate	Votes	%
Vivian Santos	5,327	57.37
Kate Sjoberg	2,936	31.62
Dean Koshelanyk	1,022	11.01

River Heights-Fort Garry
Candidate	Votes	%
John Orlikow (X)	12,717	69.08
Garth Steek	4,684	25.45
Gary Lenko	1,007	5.47

St. Boniface
Candidate	Votes	%
Matt Allard (X)	13,649	82.79
Marcel Boille	2,838	17.21

St. James
Candidate	Votes	%
Scott Gillingham (X)	9,130	55.43
Shawn Dobson (X)	5,740	34.85
Kurt Morton	1,601	9.72

St. Norbert-Seine River
Candidate	Votes	%
Markus Chambers	5,391	34.49
Nancy Cooke	4,827	30.88
Glenn Churchill	3,835	24.53
Nikolas Joyal	971	6.21
Chris Davis	608	3.89

St. Vital
Candidate	Votes	%
Brian Mayes (X)	14,338	89.37
Baljeet Sharma	1,706	10.63

Transcona
Candidate	Votes	%
Shawn Nason	5,247	36.97
Wally Welechenko	2,345	16.52
Alex Allard	2,183	15.38
Steven Lipischak	2,004	14.12
Basil Evan	1,139	8.03
Raymond Ulasy	531	3.74
Shane Geschiere	486	3.42
Sandeep Sharma	258	1.82

Waverly West
Candidate	Votes	%
Janice Lukes (X)	Acclaimed	

=== Ballot question ===
Do you support the opening of Portage and Main to pedestrian crossings?
Option	Vote	%
No	134,203	64.99
Yes	72,300	35.01
