= 2010 Manitoba municipal elections =

The Canadian province of Manitoba held municipal elections on October 27, 2010. Election day was on July 23, 2010 for several beach resorts including Winnipeg Beach, Dunnottar and Victoria Beach. Mayors, councillors, and school board trustees were elected.

Bill 35, The Municipal Conflict of Interest and Campaign Financing Act, was passed on October 8, 2009. This created new rules for campaigns and financing. It extended campaign rules previously in force in Winnipeg to the rest of the province. It requires candidates to provide financial statements of contributions and expenses. It also bans corporate and union donations, and limits donations to Manitoba residents. Municipalities had the option to set their own bylaw regarding maximum expenses, and municipal rebate programs.

Also new in this election is the requirement that candidates register prior to campaigning. Candidates for mayor or reeve were required to register between May 1, and September 21, 2010. Candidates for councillor had to register between June 30 to September 21, 2010.

== Brandon ==
=== Mayor ===
2010 Mayor
Candidate	Votes	%
Shari Decter Hirst	7,037	54.87%
(incumbent) Dave Burgess	5,573	43.46%
Henry Hansen	154	1.2%
Nikolas Avlonitis	60	0.47%
Total Turnout	12,824	45.67%
Eligible voters	28,078	

=== City council ===
==== Wards ====
2010 Brandon Ward 1
Candidate	Votes	%
Jeff Fawcett	964	
Mike Volek	567	
Total Turnout		

2010 Brandon Ward 2
Candidate	Votes	%
Corey Roberts	380	
Darlene Paquette	315	
Keith Edmunds	185	
Total Turnout		

2010 Brandon Ward 3
Candidate	Votes	%
(incumbent) Murray Blight	Acclaimed	
Total Turnout		

2010 Brandon Ward 4
Candidate	Votes	%
(incumbent) Jeff Harwood	Acclaimed	
Total Turnout		

2010 Brandon Ward 5
Candidate	Votes	%
(incumbent) James McCrae	Acclaimed	
Total Turnout		

2010 Brandon Ward 6
Candidate	Votes	%
(incumbent) Garth Rice	Acclaimed	
Total Turnout		

2010 Brandon Ward 7
Candidate	Votes	%
Shawn Berry	663	
Ramona Coey	432	
Michael Blatherwick	418	
Doug Orr	63	
Total Turnout		

2010 Brandon Ward 8
Candidate	Votes	%
Stephen Montague	479	
Gladden Smith	433	
(incumbent) Margo Campbell	264	
Total Turnout		

2010 Brandon Ward 9
Candidate	Votes	%
Len Isleifson	541	
(incumbent) Errol Black	540	
Total Turnout		

2010 Brandon Ward 10
Candidate	Votes	%
Jan Chaboyer	699	
(incumbent) Don Jessiman	542	
Total Turnout		

== Dauphin ==
=== Mayor ===
2010 City of Dauphin
Candidate	Vote	%
Eric Irwin	1,289	37.03%
Inky Mark	1,253	36.00%
Brian Chita	702	20.17%
(incumbent) Alex Paul	237	6.80%

=== City council ===
==== At-large ====
2010 City of Dauphin (Six Elected)
Candidate	Vote	%
(incumbent) Allen Dowhan	2,224	63.89%
(incumbent) Patti Eilers	2,169	62.31%
Rodney Juba	1,881	54.04%
Keith Tkachyk	1,737	49.90%
Martin Kaminski	1,682	48.32%
(incumbent) Wes Bernat	1,340	45.48%
Leon Kowalski	1,258	36.14%
Mike Kozak	1,185	34.04%
Curtis Kaleta	1,113	31.97%
Larry Harlow	464	13.33%
Turnout	3,481	%

== Morden ==
=== Mayor ===
2010 Morden
Candidate	Vote	%
Ken Wiebe	1,336	53.12%
Doug Wilson	1,179	46.88%
Turnout	2,515	51%

=== City council ===
==== At-large ====
2010 City of Morden (Six Elected)
Candidate	Vote	%
(incumbent) Irvin Wiebe	1,581	62.86%
Mark Hildebrandt	1,514	60.20%
(incumbent) Maurice Butler	1,276	50.74%
Brian Minaker	1,121	44.57%
Heather Francis	1,093	43.46%
Doug Frost	1,024	40.72%
Wayne Hosea	939	37.34%
Lenore Laverty	876	34.83%
Jacques Labelle	866	34.43%
Cheryl Link	811	32.25%
Patrick Driedger	692	27.51%
Nick Clayson	460	18.29%
Bruce Salmonson	426	16.94%
Beverly Rex	258	10.26%
Turnout	2515	51.31%
Eligible voters	4902	

== Portage la Prairie ==
=== Mayor ===
2010 City of Portage la Prairie
Candidate	Vote	%
(incumbent) Earl Porter	2,157	
Jeff Bereza	1,678	
Matthew Gray	247	
Turnout		%

=== City council ===
==== At-large ====
2010 City of Portage la Prairie (Six Elected)
Candidate	Vote	%
Diane Stasiuk	2,627	63.73%
(incumbent) Irvine Ferris	2,197	53.30%
Brent Budz	2,030	49.25%
Liz Driedger	1,946	47.21%
Ryan Espey	1,493	36.22%
Brent Froese	1,340	32.51%
Guy Moffatt	1,319	32.00%
Chris Tompkins	1,281	31.08%
Don Pelechaty	1,135	27.54%
Peter Vandermeulen	944	22.90%
Chris Henderson	823	19.97%
B.J. Fox	818	19.84%
Jim McDonald	812	19.70%
Charles W. Morrison	794	19.26%
Brad Sanderson	562	13.63%
Harold Catcheway	530	12.86%
Jason Bodnarchuk	416	10.09%
John Boehm	288	6.97%
Turnout	4,122	48.83%
Eligible voters	8,442	

=== School trustee ===
==== Not running ====
- John Harrison - resigned December 2009, seat not filled.
- Allen Dell.

== Selkirk ==
=== Mayoral candidates ===
2010 Mayor
Candidate	Votes	%
Larry Johannson	2,539	73.00%
David Bell	939	27.00%

=== City council ===
==== At-large ====
2010 City of Selkirk (Six Elected)
Candidate	Vote	%
(incumbent) Duane Nicol	2,282	
Ken Beerman	1,959	
(incumbent) John Buffie	1,879	
Kelly Cook	1,585	
Darlene Swiderski	1,466	
(incumbent) Pat Pruden	1,302	
(incumbent) Connie Rapko	1,142	
(incumbent) Marlene Cook	1,016	
Linda Rosser	877	
Brad Bell	867	
Pat Cordner	810	
Woody Eddie	780	
Craig Wieler	624	
Turnout		

== Steinbach ==
=== Mayoral candidates ===
2010 Mayor
Candidate	Votes	%
(incumbent) Chris Goertzen	Acclaimed	100

=== City council ===
==== At-large ====
2010 City of Steinbach (Six Elected)
Candidate	Vote	%	Expenditures
(incumbent) Jac Siemens	1,639	53.08%	$1,392.68
John Fehr	1,637	53.01%	$4,386.95
Earl Funk	1,571	50.87%	$2,443.74
(incumbent) Michael Zwaagstra	1,493	48.35%	$790.76
Cari Penner	1,396	45.21%	$4,360.60
Susan Penner	1,345	43.56%	$2,395.46
(incumbent) Abe Hiebert	1,233	39.93%	$2,822.09
Joel Hartung	1,215	39.35%	not submitted*
(incumbent) Roy Enns	980	31.74%	$877.28
Wayne Barkman	616	19.92%	not submitted*
Lee Fehler	601	19.46%	$1,012.64
Chris Summerville	444	14.39%	$2,580.97
Jerry Korman	315	10.20%	$723.71
Turnout	3,088	35.86%	
Eligible voters	8,612		

- Penalty for failure to submit finances is disqualification from running in the 2014 Manitoba municipal election

==== Not running ====
- (incumbent) Elbert Toews
- (incumbent) Art Rempel

== Thompson ==
=== Mayoral candidates ===
2010 Mayor
Candidate	Votes	%
(incumbent) Tim Johnston	1,531	43.3
Ronald Matechuck	1,323	37.4
Colleen Smook	682	19.2

- Total Votes 3,535

=== City council ===
==== At-large ====
2010 City of Thompson (Seven Elected)
Candidate	Votes	%
(incumbent) Stella Locker	2,225	62.94%
Penny Buyer	1,913	54.12%
Dennis Fenske	1,906	53.92%
(incumbent) Erin Stewart	1,883	53.28%
(incumbent) Judy Kolada	1,729	48.91%
(incumbent) Charlene Lafreniere	1,597	45.18%
Brad Evenson	1,553	43.93%
Luke Robinson	1,334	37.74%
Jasper W. Robinson	1,318	37.28%
Leslie R. Ellsworth	1,283	36.29%
Louis Morissette	1,150	32.53%
Dave Hennessey	1,128	31.91%
Dayton Barenz	949	26.85%
George Van Nieuw Amerongen	465	13.15%
Total votes	3,535	39.79%
Eligible voters	8,885	

==== Not running ====
- Harold Smith
- Oswald Sawh

== Winkler ==
=== Mayor ===
2010 City of Winkler
Candidate	Vote	%
Martin Harder	Acclaimed	

=== City council ===
==== At-large ====
2010 City of Winkler (Six Elected)
Candidate	Vote	%
Ken Wiebe	1,010	61.74%
Don Friesen	1,005	61.43%
Henry Siemens	959	58.62%
Ron Neisteter	950	58.07%
Herb Dick	927	56.67%
Marvin Plett	883	53.97%
Kenneth Thomas	800	48.90%
Ron Neufeld	561	34.29%
Michael Grenier	560	34.23&
Lloyd Thiessen	432	26.41%
Turnout	1,636	28%
Eligible voters	5,806	

== Winnipeg ==
=== Mayoral candidates ===
2010 Mayor
Candidate	Votes	%
(incumbent) Sam Katz	116,308	54.8
Judy Wasylycia-Leis	90,913	42.8
Brad Gross	3,398	1.68
Rav Gill	1,775	0.8

=== City council ===
==== Wards ====
2010 Charleswood-Tuxedo
Candidate	Vote	%
Paula Havixbeck	4,190	25.3
Jarret Hannah	4,134	25.0
Timothy Martin	3,442	20.8
Steve Szego	1,955	11.8
Livio Ciaralli	1,271	7.7
Wendy Lenton	965	5.8
Dashi Zargani	581	3.5

2010 Daniel McIntyre, City Council
Candidate	Vote	%
(incumbent) Harvey Smith	3,251	27.6
Cindy Gilroy-Price	3,143	26.7
Keith Bellamy	2,899	24.6
Lito Taruc	1,824	15.5
John Cardoso	645	5.5

2010 Elmwood-East Kildonan
Candidate	Vote	%
Thomas Steen	3,921	33.7
Shaneen Robinson	3,705	31.9
Rod Giesbrecht	3,501	30.1
Gordon Warren	264	2.3
Nelson Sanderson	236	2.0

2010 Fort Rouge-East Fort Garry
Candidate	Vote	%
(incumbent) Jenny Gerbasi	9,359	63.2
Ian Rabb	4,250	28.7
Shane Nestruck	1,189	8.0

2010 Mynarski
Candidate	Vote	%
Ross Eadie	4,007	40.7
Jenny Motkaluk	2,734	27.8
Greg Littlejohn	1,989	20.2
David Polsky	657	6.7
Trevor Mueller	297	3.0
John Petrinka	161	1.6

2010 North Kildonan
Candidate	Vote	%
(incumbent) Jeff Browaty	9,136	62.9
Brian Olynik	4,733	32.6
Wendy Pasaluko-Plas	647	4.5

2010 Old Kildonan
Candidate	Vote	%
Devi Sharma	6,490	47.9
Casey Jones	5,027	37.1
Robert Chennells	2,031	15.0

2010 Point Douglas
Candidate	Vote	%
(incumbent) Mike Pagtakhan	7,370	76.2
Dean Koshelanyk	1,860	19.2
Herman Holla	448	4.6

2010 River Heights-Fort Garry
Candidate	Vote	%
(incumbent) John Orlikow	10,713	55.3
Michael Kowalson	8,677	44.7

2010 St. Boniface
Candidate	Vote	%
(incumbent) Dan Vandal	15,242	82.2
Christopher Watt	3,291	17.8

2010 St. Charles
Candidate	Vote	%
(incumbent) Grant Nordman	6,166	52.1
Shawn Dobson	4,063	34.4
Lloyd Finlay	1,596	13.5

2010 St. James-Brooklands
Candidate	Vote	%
(incumbent) Scott Fielding	6,452	59.5
Deanne Crothers	3,418	31.5
Fred Morris	966	8.9

2010 St. Norbert
Candidate	Vote	%
(incumbent) Justin Swandel	8,745	55.9
Louise May	6,892	44.1

2010 St. Vital
Candidate	Vote	%
(incumbent) Gord Steeves	14,960	82.3
Harry Wolbert	3,207	17.7

2010 Transcona
Candidate	Vote	%
(incumbent) Russ Wyatt	9,503	83.4
Vlad Kowalyk	1,885	16.6

==== Not running ====
- Mike O'Shaughnessy (retired)
- Lillian Thomas (retired)
- Bill Clement (deceased)
- Harry Lazarenko (retired)

== See also ==
2006 Manitoba Municipal Elections Results
