= Corporate welfare =

Government grants, tax breaks, or other special favorable treatment for corporations

Corporate welfare refers to government financial assistance, subsidies, tax breaks, or other favorable policies provided to private businesses or specific industries, ostensibly to promote economic growth, job creation, or other public benefits. This support can take various forms, including tax credits, tax deductions, tax exemptions, government contracts, preferential regulatory treatment, debt write-offs, public-private partnerships, bailout programs, discount schemes, deferrals, low-interest loans or loan guarantees, direct subsidies or public grants.

The definition of corporate welfare is sometimes restricted to direct government subsidies of major corporations, excluding tax loopholes and all manner of regulatory and trade decisions.

== Origin of term ==
The term "corporate welfare" was reportedly coined in 1956 by Ralph Nader.

== Alternative adages ==
=== "Socialism for the rich, capitalism for the poor" ===
Believed to have been first popularised by Michael Harrington's 1962 book The Other America in which Harrington cited Charles Abrams, a noted authority on housing.

Variations on this adage have been used in criticisms of the United States' economic policy by Joe Biden, Martin Luther King Jr., Gore Vidal, Joseph P. Kennedy II, Robert F. Kennedy, Jr., Dean Baker, Noam Chomsky, Robert Reich, John Pilger, Bernie Sanders, and Yanis Varoufakis.

=== "Privatizing profits and socializing losses" ===
"Privatizing profits and socializing losses" refers to the idea that corporations want to reserve financial gains for themselves and pass along losses to the rest of society, potentially through lobbying the government for assistance. This practice was criticized in the Wall Street bailout of 2008.

== By country ==
=== United States ===
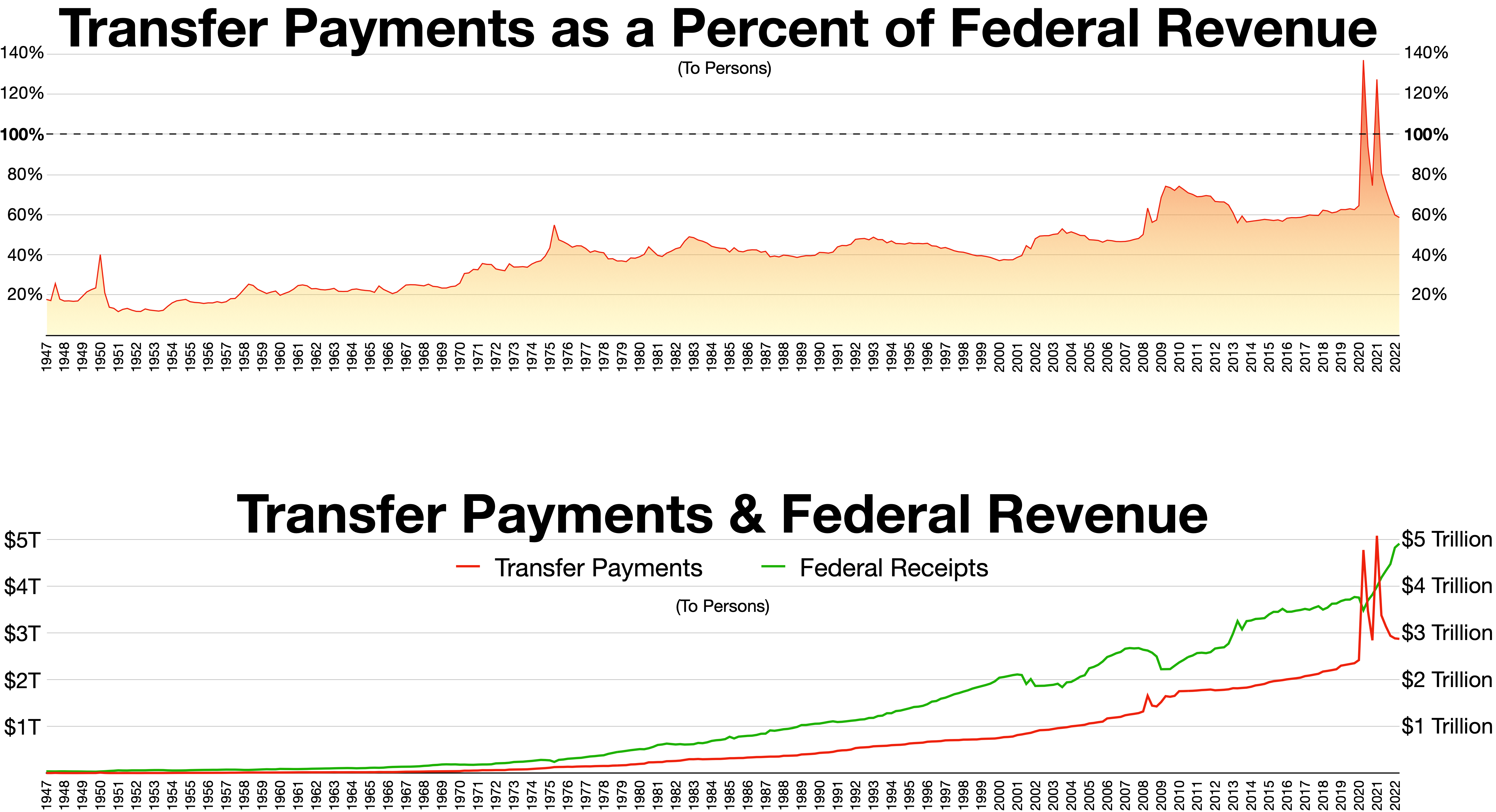
Transfer payments to (persons) as a percent of Federal revenue in the United States

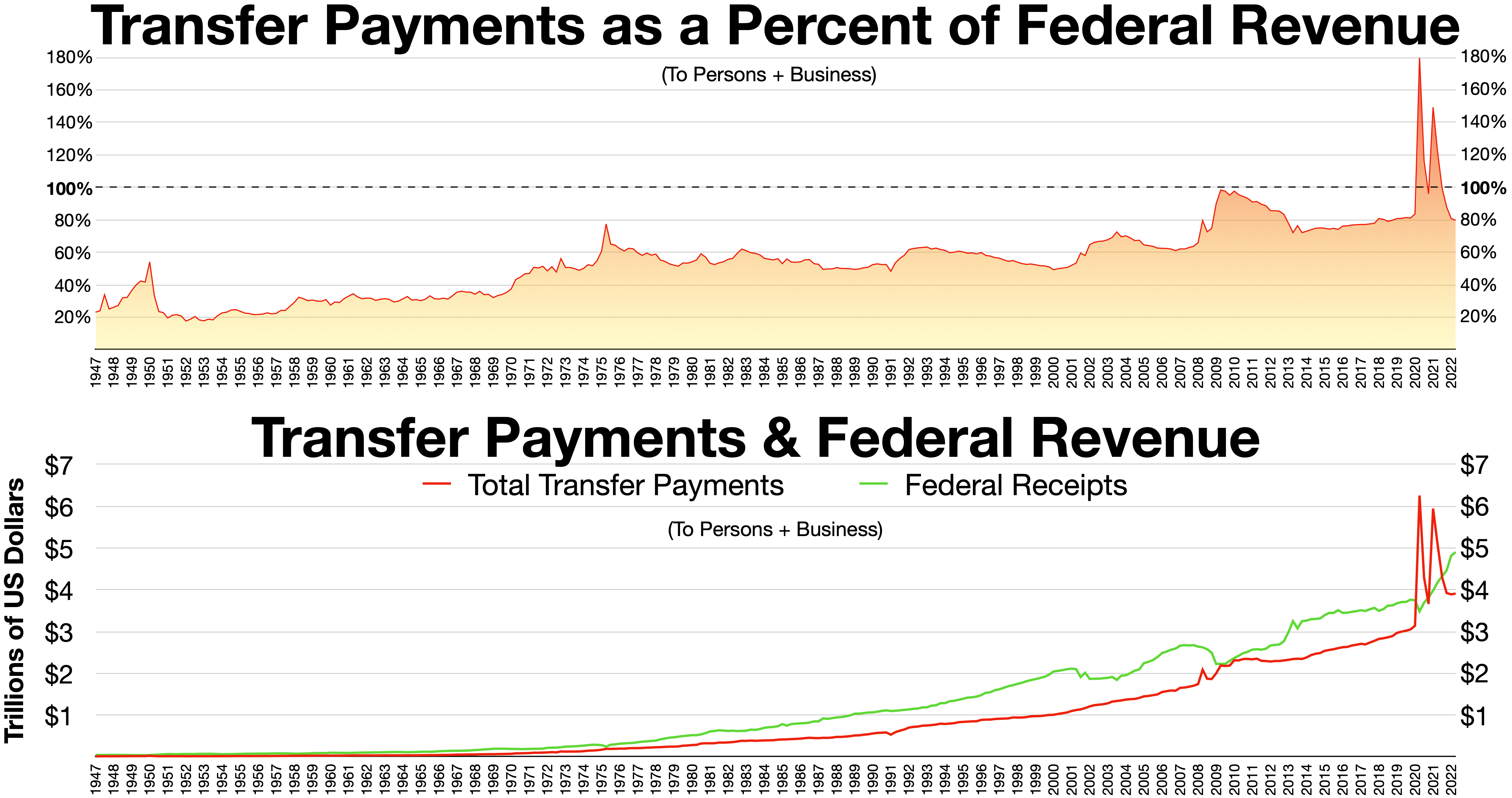
Transfer payments to (persons + business) in the United States

==== Background ====
Subsidies considered excessive, unwarranted, wasteful, unfair, inefficient, or bought by lobbying are often called corporate welfare. The label of corporate welfare is often used to decry projects advertised as benefiting the general welfare that spend a disproportionate amount of funds on large corporations, and often in uncompetitive, or anti-competitive ways. For instance, in the United States, agricultural subsidies are usually portrayed as helping independent farmers stay afloat. In actuality, the majority of income gained from commodity support programs has gone to large agribusiness corporations such as Archer Daniels Midland, as they own a considerably larger percentage of production.

Alan Peters and Peter Fisher, Associate Professors at the University of Iowa, have estimated that state and local governments provide $40–50 billion annually in economic development incentives, which critics characterize as corporate welfare.

Multiple economists have considered the 2008 bank bailouts in the United States to be a form of corporate welfare. U.S. politicians have also contended that zero-interest loans from the Federal Reserve System to financial institutions during and after the 2008 financial crisis were a hidden, backdoor form of corporate welfare. The term gained increased prominence in 2018 when Senator Bernie Sanders introduced a bill, singling out Amazon and Walmart in particular, to require a company with 500 or more employees to pay the full cost of welfare benefits received by its workers.

==== Comprehensive analyses ====
===== Independent =====
Daniel D. Huff, professor emeritus of social work at Boise State University, published a comprehensive analysis of corporate welfare in 1993. Huff reasoned that a very conservative estimate of corporate welfare expenditures in the United States would have been at least US$170 billion in 1990. Huff compared this number with social welfare:

In 1990 the federal government spent 4.7 billion dollars on all forms of international aid. Pollution control programs received 4.8 billion dollars of federal assistance while both secondary and elementary education were allotted only 8.4 billion dollars. More to the point, while more than 170 billion dollars is expended on assorted varieties of corporate welfare the federal government spends 11 billion dollars on Aid for Dependent Children. The most expensive means tested welfare program, Medicaid, costs the federal government 30 billion dollars a year or about half of the amount corporations receive each year through assorted tax breaks. S.S.I., the federal program for the disabled, receives 13 billion dollars while American businesses are given 17 billion in direct federal aid.

Huff argued that deliberate obfuscation was a complicating factor.

=== United Kingdom ===
In 2015, Kevin Farnsworth, a senior lecturer in Social Policy at the University of York published a paper in which he claimed that the government was providing corporate subsidies of £93 billion. This amount includes the role of the government in increasing trade, tax relief for businesses that invest in new plants and machinery (estimated by Farnsworth at £20 billion), not charging fuel duty on fuel used by railways or airlines, green energy subsidies, a lower corporation tax rate for small companies, regional development grants and government procurement for businesses (which Farnsworth suggests often favours British businesses even when these are not the best value option available). However, The Register wrote that Farnsworth's figure for tax relief for investment was incorrect and that he had made mistakes in his calculations, noting that he was not an accountant. It also stated that not charging businesses taxes under certain circumstances (when the reliefs applied) was not the same as giving them a subsidy. Fuel duty is not charged on airlines due to the Convention on International Civil Aviation (a UN agency) which specifies that aeroplanes should be exempt from fuel duties.

==== Political discussion ====
In 2015, Labour Party leader Jeremy Corbyn said he would "strip out" the £93bn of "corporate tax relief and subsidies" Farnsworth referred to and use the proceeds for public investment. Corbyn did not say which specific policies he would change. The Guardian wrote the policy "sounds wonderful, but careful scrutiny of 'corporate welfare' shows that it includes capital allowances designed to persuade companies to invest, regional aid to boost growth in rundown parts of the UK, and subsidies to keep bus and rail routes open – none of which Corbyn would presumably like to see stopped."

=== Canada ===
The New Democratic Party in Canada picked up the term as a major theme in its 1972 federal election campaign. Its leader, David Lewis, used the term in the title of his 1972 book, Louder Voices: The Corporate Welfare Bums.

The Reform Party and its successor the Canadian Alliance were known for opposing most business subsidies, but after their merger with the Progressive Conservative party, they dropped their opposition.

=== India ===
It was observed by The Wire that the effective tax rate was low for the larger corporations which meant companies making smaller profits are competing in an unequal environment against bigger companies with substantial taxation benefits, with the gap in effective tax rates widening over the years. Prime Minister of India Narendra Modi criticised this practice, saying:

"Why is it that subsidies going to the well-off are portrayed in a positive manner? Let me give you an example. The total revenue loss from incentives to corporate tax payers was over Rs 62,000 crore... I must confess I am surprised by the way words are used by experts on this matter. When a benefit is given to farmers or to the poor, experts and government officers normally call it a subsidy. However, I find that if a benefit is given to industry or commerce, it is usually an 'incentive' or a 'subvention'."

=== Australia ===
Government assistance to business in Australia is measured annually by the Productivity Commission in its Trade and Assistance Review. The Commission estimated Australian Government budgetary assistance to industry at A$16.8 billion in 2024–25, an increase of 6.4% on the previous year. Australian politicians, journalists and commentators have applied the term "corporate welfare" both to such assistance and to incentives offered by state governments to attract or retain corporate investment.

The practice was widely debated in 2013 and 2014, when several large firms sought federal support. In its 2014 inquiry report on automotive manufacturing – an industry it estimated had received more than A$30 billion in assistance between 1997 and 2012 – the Productivity Commission concluded that "the policy rationales for industry-specific assistance to automotive manufacturing firms are weak and the economywide costs of such assistance outweigh the benefits". Writing for the ABC, Institute of Public Affairs research fellow Chris Berg argued that "corporate welfare is economically ineffective, politically corrupting, and morally dubious".

==== COVID-19 wage subsidies ====
During the COVID-19 pandemic, the JobKeeper wage subsidy – at A$88.8 billion, one of the largest fiscal measures in Australian history – supported around 4 million employees; an independent evaluation commissioned by the Treasury concluded that it had preserved roughly 300,000 to 800,000 jobs and provided value for money. In its first phase, eligibility rested on a forecast fall in turnover, and there was "no claw-back mechanism to enable the Government to reclaim payments made to businesses that did not ultimately experience expected turnover declines", a design the Treasury said was intended to give businesses certainty. Treasury analysis published in 2021 found that about A$27 billion had been paid in the first six months to businesses whose turnover did not fall by the qualifying amount, including A$13.8 billion to businesses whose turnover increased. The Parliamentary Budget Office later estimated that at least A$38 billion had gone to employers that did not record a sustained qualifying downturn. Repayment was voluntary; about A$225 million had been returned by mid-2021, almost 90% of it by listed companies subject to disclosure requirements.

==== Qantas ====
The airline Qantas has been a recurrent focus of Australian debate about corporate welfare; the ABC's business editor, Ian Verrender, wrote in 2022 that the company held "the dubious distinction of being the nation's biggest recipient of corporate welfare".

In September 2020 Qantas announced a review of its property holdings that placed its Sydney head office, Jetstar's Melbourne office and its Brisbane heavy maintenance base in question, and said it would seek state government financial support in deciding where each should be located. The New South Wales, Victorian and Queensland governments each made offers. Federal trade and tourism minister Simon Birmingham described the move as "a blatant attempt to extract taxpayer dollars from the states and territories" and warned that it could "spark a wave of corporate welfare-seeking by big business", adding that "in the end, it's taxpayers picking up the bill". A Qantas spokesman responded that the pandemic had forced the company to look "right across our business for ways to be more efficient" and that "it's hard to see why state governments responding positively is a bad thing".

In May 2021 Qantas announced that none of the three operations would move, each state having offered payroll tax relief, property rebates or direct cash incentives; the total value was not disclosed. Documents later tabled in the Parliament of New South Wales showed that the state had offered A$50 million over four years, conditional on Qantas remaining in New South Wales until at least 2051, committing to at least 2,000 additional full-time-equivalent jobs and basing its planned ultra-long-haul flights in Sydney; Qantas said it would invest A$50 million over a decade in return for the benefits it received from the states.

Qantas received about A$2.7 billion in Australian government pandemic support, including approximately A$900 million under JobKeeper. Disclosures compiled by the Australian Securities and Investments Commission made it the largest listed recipient of the wage subsidy, at A$856 million across the 2020 and 2021 financial years. It did not repay any of the subsidy, and after the airline reported a record A$2.47 billion annual profit in August 2023, chief executive Alan Joyce rejected calls for repayment, saying "as we're making money, we'll pay corporate tax", and treasurer Jim Chalmers said that when the funds were provided "there wasn't an understanding or an agreement that they would be repaid in some form". Qantas has not always obtained the support it sought: in March 2014 the federal government refused its request for a guarantee of its debt, prime minister Tony Abbott saying the airline was best placed to compete "unshackled and un-propped up by government".

== See also ==
- Crony capitalism
- Corporatocracy
- Fossil fuel subsidies
- Kleptocracy
- Political corruption
- Pork barrel
- Public choice theory
- Public-private partnership
- Regulatory capture
