= 2006 Manitoba municipal elections =

The Canadian province of Manitoba held municipal elections on October 25, 2006.

== Brandon ==
Candidate	Vote	%
Dave Burgess (X)	8,127	63.3
Mike G. Abbey	1,553	12.1
Deveryn Ross	1,495	11.6
Beth Smale	1,490	11.6
Nicholas Alvonitis	107	0.8
Deborah Boschman	74	0.6

2006 Brandon municipal election: Councillor, Ward Four
Candidate	Votes	%
Jeff Harwood	677	46.92
Glen Kruck	364	25.23
Damon Roth	213	14.76
Garnet Boyd	189	13.10
Total valid votes	1,443	100.00

- Jeff Harwood is a teacher in Brandon. He was a councillor for the city's second ward in the 1980s, and represented Brandon before the Royal Commission on National Passenger Transportation in 1990. Following the events of September 11, 2001, Harwood wrote a piece supporting increased border security and an "increased role for our Armed Forces in national security". He wrote a public letter in support of the Progressive Conservative Party of Canada in 2002. The following year, he criticized Prime Minister Jean Chrétien for not supporting the United States of America in the 2003 invasion of Iraq.

2006 Brandon municipal election: Councillor, Ward Seven
Candidate	Votes	%
Ken Fitzpatrick	1,272	89.64
Jeff Sexton	147	10.36
Total valid votes	1,419	100.00

- Ken Fitzpatrick is an information system manager. He was first elected for Brandon's seventh ward in a 1999 by-election, after the previous member, Scott Smith, was elected to the Legislative Assembly of Manitoba. Fitzpatrick left the council in 2002, but was returned in 2006.

2006 Brandon municipal election: School Trustee (eight members elected)
Candidate	Votes	%
Brian Mayes	6,967	10.00
(x)Jim Murray	5,518	7.92
(x)Marty Snelling	4,985	7.15
Peter Bartlette	4,449	6.38
Bea Jolly	4,353	6.25
(x)Linda L. Ross	4,352	6.25
Ramona Coey	4,167	5.98
George Buri	4,141	5.94
(x)Cheryl Burke	4,127	5.92
Rita Cullen	4,094	5.88
Patrick Pulak	4,090	5.87
Linda Freiheit	3,432	4.93
Fred Nickerson	2,653	3.81
Perry Roque	2,430	3.49
Wayne Langlois	2,331	3.35
Douglas K. Orr	1,970	2.83
Robert Ironstand	1,730	2.48
Kara Morrice	1,711	2.46
Angel Brunka	1,264	1.81
Gaetano Magnifico	920	1.32
Total valid votes	69,684	100.00

Electors could vote for eight candidates.

The percentages are determined in relation to the total number of votes.

- Brian Mayes was born in Winnipeg, Manitoba. He holds a Bachelor of Public Administration degree from Carleton University (1984), and Master of Industrial Relations (1988) and Bachelor of Laws (2001) degrees from the University of Toronto. He ran for the Toronto City Council's thirteenth ward in 1991 as a New Democratic Party candidate, campaigning on a platform of affordable rental housing and police foot patrols on Bloor Street. He lost to John Adams. Mayes also worked as a representative of the Ontario Public Service Employees Union in this period, and was a vocal opponent of the Social Contract legislation introduced by Bob Rae's government. In 1993, he negotiated a pact for 1,000 OPSEU workers to avoid a wage freeze and unpaid holidays. He sought election to the Toronto City Council again in 1997, and was unsuccessful. As of 2006, he operates a private law practice in Brandon. He has served on the boards of Brandon University and the Workers Compensation Board of Manitoba. He was first elected to the Brandon School Board in 2006.
- Alexander James Murray is a hairstylist. He was first elected to the Brandon School Division in 1995, and was re-elected in 1998, 2002 and 2006. He served as chair of the board in his second term, and was part of a majority of trustees who argued against service cuts during the budget negotiations of 1998 and 1999. In 2000, he endorsed a tax increase designed to improve the division's teacher-to-student ratio. He declined to initiate merger talks with neighbouring rural school boards in 2001, due to concerns that Brandon would be seen as taking over other divisions. In 2003, he was elected unopposed to a one-year term as a vice-president of the Manitoba Association of School Trustees. He was chosen as chairperson of the Brandon board once again after the 2006 election.
- Peter Bartlette worked as an instructor in Brandon schools for 32 years before his election in 2006. He was self-employed at the time of the election, and campaigned on a platform of "visible, accountable management".
- Bea Jolly is a retired educator. She holds a Class 3 Childcare Certificate and a Permanent Special and Vocational Education Certificate. She taught in the United Kingdom from 1949 to 1967, and in Brandon from 1967 to 1996. Her husband, Malcolm Jolly, was a member of the Brandon School Board from 1992 until his death in 2003. She was first elected to the Brandon School Board in 2006, running on a platform of defending the public school system.
- Linda L. Ross holds a Ph.D. in Psychology from the University of Manitoba (1985). She was Director of the Agency Behavioral Consultation project at Surrey Place Centre in Toronto from 1985 to 1987, when she joined the Department of Psychology at Brandon University. In 1997, she was appointed acting Dean of the Department. She was first elected to the Brandon School Board in a 1993 by-election, and was re-elected in 1995, 1998, 2002 and 2006. She served as board chair during her second term. In 1998, she accused provincial Education Minister Linda McIntosh of undermining the quality of education in Manitoba by withholding adequate financial support. During the 1990s, she chaired the steering committee for a first nations and aboriginal counselling program at Brandon University.
- Ramona Coey has an advanced degree in applied economics, and has worked in banking and small business. She was first elected to the Brandon School Board in 2006.
- George Buri has over 30 years' experience as a public school teacher. He was first elected to the Brandon School Board in 2006.
- Wayne Langlois is a provincial assessment officer, and a frequent candidate for public office. He ran for Mayor of Brandon in 1998, centring his campaign on an opposition to property tax increases. He later ran for the seventh ward council seat in a 1999 by-election, and ran again for the same position in 2002. Langlois also sought the federal New Democratic Party nomination for Brandon—Souris in 2000, but lost to Errol Black. He received a community service award from the provincial government in 2003, for his work with organizations such as the John Howard Society and Housing for the Physically Challenged.

== Rural Municipality of Elton ==
2006 Neepawa municipal election, Mayor
Candidate	Total votes	% of total votes
(incumbent)Jon B. Burton	acclaimed	n/a

2006 Neepawa municipal election, Councillor, Ward 1
Candidate	Total votes	% of total votes
(incumbent)Ross Farley	acclaimed	n/a

2006 Neepawa municipal election, Councillor, Ward 2
Candidate	Total votes	% of total votes
(incumbent)David Mazier	acclaimed	n/a

2006 Neepawa municipal election, Councillor, Ward 3
Candidate	Total votes	% of total votes
(incumbent)Harvey Paterson	acclaimed	n/a

2006 Neepawa municipal election, Councillor, Ward 4
Candidate	Total votes	% of total votes
(incumbent)Arthur R. Penner	elected	.
Ches Bollman	defeated	.

2006 Neepawa municipal election, Councillor, Ward 5
Candidate	Total votes	% of total votes
Jim Boyd	elected	.
(incumbent)Allan J. Meadows	defeated	.

2006 Neepawa municipal election, Councillor, Ward 6
Candidate	Total votes	% of total votes
(incumbent) Danny Kowbel	acclaimed	n/a

Sources: Unofficial results of nominations for the Rural Municipality of Elton, 19 September 2006, Election returns for the Rural Municipality of Elton, 26 October 2006 (lists winning candidates).

== Neepawa ==
2006 Neepawa municipal election, Mayor
Candidate	Total votes	% of total votes
(incumbent)Robert Durston	elected	.
Barb Harris	defeated	.
Dean Dietrich	defeated	.

- Robert G. Durston has a Bachelor of Science degree in Agriculture from the University of Manitoba. He is a retired provincial agriculture representative, and was a veteran councillor before he first ran for mayor in the 1998 election. Narrowly defeated on that occasion by Ken Waddell, Durston was successful in a 2002 rematch. Shortly after his election, Durston called for Manitoba's smoking ban to be determined at the provincial election, rather than by individual municipalities. There was a threat of mass layoffs at Neepawa's Springhill Farms hog processing plant during his first term, though a loan from the Manitoba Industrial Opportunities Program ultimately saved the jobs. In late 2003, Durston convinced the Association of Manitoba Municipalities to pass a motion calling for stricter testing standards on bottled water. Re-elected in 2006, he announced the creation of a new personal-care home in the community in June 2007. Later in the same year, he welcomed the decision of Hytek Ltd. to expand Springfield Farms and create 200 new jobs.

2006 Neepawa municipal election, Councillors (six elected)
Candidate	Total votes	% of total votes
(incumbent)Wayne Hollier	elected	.
(incumbent)Ronald Forsman	elected	.
Wendy Menzies	elected	.
(incumbent)Bill Stilwell	elected	.
Jim Cockburn	elected	.
Monty Simon	elected	.
Amanda Naughton-Gale	defeated	.

Electors could votes for six candidates.

== Pinawa ==
2006 Pinawa municipal election, Mayor
Candidate	Total votes	% of total votes
Blair Skinner	acclaimed	.

2006 Pinawa municipal election, Councillors (four elected)
Candidate	Total votes	% of total votes
Clayton McMurren	619	23.46
(incumbent)Lynn Patterson	596	22.58
(incumbent)Karla Rae Elcock	481	18.23
Lloyd Rattai	425	16.10
Gerald Tretiak	310	11.75
Phil Mitchell	208	7.88
Total valid votes	2,639	100.00

Electors could vote for four candidates. The percentages are determined in relation to the total number of votes.

== Portage la Prairie ==
Candidate	Vote	%
Ken Brennan	2,119	52.1
Earl James Porter	1,458	35.9
Calvin Turko	486	12

2006 Portage la Prairie municipal election, City Councillors (six elected)
Candidate	Total votes	% of total votes
Jeff Bereza	2,351	11.27
Janet Shindle	2,023	9.79
(incumbent) Orville Wagner	1,690	8.10
(incumbent) Walter P. Keryluk	1,645	7.89
Irvine Ferris	1,348	6.50
(incumbent)Dave Quinn	1,326	6.36
Bill Hamilton	1,253	5.96
B.J. Fox	1,198	5.74
Jack McLean	1,007	4.83
Rick Deleau	944	4.53
(incumbent) Perry Robinson	924	4.43
Jim McDonald	849	4.07
Ian MacKenzie	780	3.74
Lou Lapointe	750	3.56
Florence Straume	678	3.25
Matthew Gray	599	2.87
Peter Vandemeulen	599	2.87
Ron White	346	1.66
Larry Spence	289	1.39
Rodney Slater	243	1.16
Total valid votes	20,859	100.00

== Selkirk ==
Candidate	Vote	%
David K. Bell (X)	1,736	52.7
Darlene Swiderski	1,323	40.2
Linda Rosky-Rosser	232	7.0

2006 Selkirk municipal election, Councillors (six elected)
Candidate	Total votes	% of total votes
Larry Johannson	2,361	16.31
(incumbent)Pat Pruden	1,913	13.22
(incumbent)Duane Nicol	1,693	11.70
Connie Rapko	1,674	11.57
(incumbent)Marlene Cook	1,656	11.44
(incumbent)John Buffie	1,577	10.90
(incumbent)Chris Pawley	1,513	10.45
William E. Flett	1,108	7.66
Pat Cordner	979	6.76
Total valid votes	14,474	100.00

Electors could votes for six candidates. Percentages are determined in relation to the total number of votes. Source: City of Selkirk, website accessed 31 August 2007.

- Patricia Pruden was an LPN for 31 years at the Selkirk & District General Hospital, before her retirement in 2003. She was first elected to the Selkirk City Council in 2002, and was appointed to the Interlake Regional Health Authority in 2004. She was re-elected in 2006.

== Steinbach ==
2006 Steinbach municipal election, Councillors (six elected)
Candidate	Vote
Jac Siemens	2,387
Art Rempel	1,974
Michael Zwaagstra	1,773
Abe Hiebert	1,721
Elbert Toews	1,513
Roy Enns	1,484

- These are the elected officials only, information at time of addition was limited to the 6 elected councilors.

== Winnipeg ==
=== Mayoral race ===
Candidate	Vote	%
Sam Katz (X)	104,379	61.6
Marianne Cerilli	38,227	22.6
Kaj Hasselriis	22,401	13.2
Ron Pollock	4,444	2.6

=== City council ===
Elected councillors

Ward	Elected
Charleswood-Tuxedo	Bill Clement (X)
St. Charles	Grant Nordman (X)
St. James-Brooklands	Scott Fielding
Daniel McIntyre	Harvey Smith (X)
Fort Rouge-East Fort Garry	Jenny Gerbasi (X)
River Heights-Fort Garry	Brenda Leipsic
Elmwood-East Kildonan	Lillian Thomas (X)
North Kildonan	Jeff Browaty
Transcona	Russ Wyatt (X)
Mynarski	Harry Lazarenko (X)
Old Kildonan	Mike O'Shaughnessy (X)
Point Douglas	Mike Pagtakhan (X)
St. Boniface	Daniel Vandal
St. Norbert	Justin Swandel (X)
St. Vital	Gord Steeves (X)

== Mayoral races across the province ==
=== Dauphin ===
Candidate	Vote	%
Alex Paul	1320	52.5
Brian Chita	1192	47.5

=== East St. Paul ===
(Race for reeve)

Candidate	Vote	%
Lawrence Morris	2,145	65.1
Dave F. Gera	1,148	34.9

=== Flin Flon ===
Candidate	Vote	%
Tom Therien	Elected	
Lyle Borgstrom		
Robin James		
Tricia Mymko		

=== Hanover ===
(For reeve)

Candidate	Vote	%
Stan Toews	1,229	47.2
Neil Warkentin	1,197	46.0
Bruce Taggart	178	6.8

=== Macdonald ===
(Race for reeve)

Candidate	Vote	%
Rodney Burns (X)	ACCLAIMED	

=== Morden ===
Candidate	Vote	%
Doug Wilson	1,337	55.8
John B. Wiens (X)	1,061	44.2

=== RM of Portage la Parairie ===
(Race for reeve)

Candidate	Vote	%
Toby Trimble	ACCLAIMED	

=== Rockwood ===
(Race for reeve)

Candidate	Vote	%
Garnet Thievin (X)	ACCLAIMED	

=== Springfield ===
(for reeve)

Candidate	Vote	%
Peter Skrupski	Elected	
John Holland (X)		
Garry Brown		
Don Matheson		
Doug Shaver		

=== Stanley ===
(Race for reeve)

Candidate	Vote	%
Art Petkau	Elected	
Jack Peters		

=== St. Clements ===
(for reeve)

Candidate	Vote	%
Steve Strang	Elected	
Kenneth L. Thomas		

=== Steinbach ===
Candidate	Vote	%
Chris Goertzen	2,426	69.9
Dwight Reimer	1,043	30.1

=== St. Andrews ===
(for reeve)

Candidate	Vote	%
Don Forfar (X)	1,653	56.6
Martin Zelych	1,270	43.4

=== Taché ===
(for reeve)

Candidate	Vote	%
William Danylchuk (X)	Elected	
Georges Bohémier		

=== The Pas ===
Candidate	Vote	%
Herb Jaques	Elected	
Grant Buchanan		

=== Thompson ===
Candidate	Vote	%
Tim Johnston	1,545	
Bob Desjarlais	1,106	
Ron Matechuk	881	
Leo Landers	431	

=== Winkler ===
Candidate	Vote	%
Martin Harder		67.3
Walter Siemens		20.4
Dave Penner		12.1
