= Vote Marriage Canada =

Vote Marriage Canada was a socially conservative political lobbying group organized for the Canadian federal election in 2006 aiming at the overturning of the legal recognition of same-sex marriage in Canada.

Vote Marriage was founded by former Members of Parliament Pat O'Brien (Liberal) and Grant Hill (Conservative) in 2005. It opposed same-sex marriage, and was officially non-partisan. There were 100 incumbents endorsed – 84 Conservative, 11 Liberal, 4 Bloc and 1 Independent.

Forty-seven of the forty-eight western and northern candidates endorsed by Vote Marriage Canada on 18 January 2006 were members of the Conservative Party. The other was independent Bev Desjarlais, formerly of the New Democratic Party.
