= Bev Desjarlais =

Canadian politician (1955–2018)

Member of Parliament for Churchill
- In office June 2, 1997 – January 23, 2006
- Preceded by: Elijah Harper
- Succeeded by: Tina Keeper

Personal details
- Born: Beverly Faye Nowoselsky; August 19, 1955 Regina, Saskatchewan, Canada
- Died: March 15, 2018 (aged 62) Brandon, Manitoba, Canada
- Party: Independent (2005–2006); New Democratic Party (1997–2005)
- Spouse: Robert Desjarlais (divorced)
- Profession: Clerk

Beverly Faye Desjarlais (née Nowoselsky; August 19, 1955 – March 15, 2018) was a Canadian politician. She represented the Manitoba electoral district of Churchill in the House of Commons of Canada from 1997 to 2006, initially as a New Democrat and later as an independent after losing her party's nomination in late 2005. She had lost the confidence of the NDP after she voted against the Civil Marriage Act, legalizing same-sex marriage in Canada. She later worked as a departmental aide to Conservative Veterans Affairs Minister Greg Thompson.

Her ex-husband, Bob Desjarlais, was a prominent labour leader in northern Manitoba, who campaigned for Mayor of Thompson in 2006.

== Early life and career ==
Desjarlais was born in Regina, Saskatchewan. She graduated from Bert Fox Composite High School in 1973, and held several positions at the General Hospital in Thompson, Manitoba, over the next twenty-four years. At the time of her election, she was a ward clerk. Desjarlais was also a union steward with the United Food and Commercial Workers and a member of Canadian Parents for French.

Her political career began in 1992, when she was elected as a trustee for the Mystery Lake School Division. She became Chair of the Board in 1994, and served until her election to Parliament in 1997.

== Member of Parliament ==
=== New Democratic Party MP ===
Desjarlais challenged Liberal incumbent Elijah Harper for the Churchill riding in the 1997 federal election. Although Harper had gained national fame in 1990 for blocking passage of the Meech Lake Accord (while he was serving as the NDP member of the Legislative Assembly of Manitoba for Rupertsland), he was not a prominent Member of Parliament. Desjarlais won by 2,764 votes and joined twenty other New Democrats on the opposition benches. Her opposition to the Canadian gun registry was likely a contributing factor to her victory, as the registry was unpopular in rural Manitoba.

She held several official responsibilities in the 36th Canadian Parliament, including serving as her party's critic for housing and the Treasury Board of Canada. In the latter capacity, she was a prominent supporter of pay equity policies to benefit Canadian women. Desjarlais was also chosen as her party's representative on the Commons Transport Committee, and held this position for several years. She defeated Harper again in the 2000 election, and NDP leader Alexa McDonough appointed her to be the party's Industry Critic in the following parliament.

In 2001, she participated in a military training exercise to educate parliamentarians about the Canadian Forces. Desjarlais joined the Canadian Air Force for a week, and participated in a search and rescue exercise in Northern Ontario. She later supported fellow Manitoba MP Bill Blaikie's campaign to become NDP leader in 2002–03. Blaikie finished second against Jack Layton.

Desjarlais was re-elected in the 2004 election over a strong challenge from Liberal candidate and First Nations leader Ron Evans. After the election, she was named NDP critic for Transport, Crown Corporations, and the Canadian Wheat Board in the 38th Canadian Parliament. In early 2005, former Assembly of First Nations National Chief Ovide Mercredi announced that he would challenge Desjarlais for the NDP nomination in Churchill. He later withdrew the challenge.

=== Policy views ===
Desjarlais was one of the most socially conservative members of the federal NDP, and when in caucus was its most socially conservative member. She was the only New Democrat to vote against the Civil Marriage Act (Bill C-38), which legalized same-sex marriage in Canada, on its third and final reading in 2005. Her position placed her in conflict with both official NDP policy and party leader Jack Layton, who described same-sex marriage as a human rights issue and ruled that caucus members would not be permitted a free vote on matters of equality.

Desjarlais argued that her position was based on personal religious convictions and was not grounded in homophobia. She acknowledged as early as 2003 that opposing same-sex marriage was contrary to NDP policy, and accepted that "discipline may take place" as a result. She was stripped of her shadow cabinet posts after the 2005 vote.

On other issues, her views were closer to official NDP policy. She was a strong defender of the rights of labour and public health care and supported the principle of aboriginal self-government.

=== Independent MP ===
On October 17, 2005, Desjarlais lost the Churchill NDP nomination to Niki Ashton, daughter of Manitoba cabinet minister Steve Ashton, in a vote of the membership of the Churchill NDP riding association. She resigned from the NDP caucus on the same day and announced she would run as an independent in the next federal election, which took place on January 23, 2006 after Prime Minister Paul Martin's government lost a vote of confidence. She acknowledged that her position on same-sex marriage was a prominent factor in her defeat.

Desjarlais was endorsed on January 5, 2006 by Vote Marriage Canada, a group which opposes same-sex marriage. She finished third, behind Ashton and winning Liberal candidate (and North of 60 star) Tina Keeper.

== After defeat ==
After her defeat, Desjarlais took a job in Ottawa in the office of Greg Thompson, Minister of Veterans' Affairs in the Conservative government of Stephen Harper. The reaction from her former NDP colleagues was mixed. Caucus Chair Judy Wasylycia-Leis described her decision as "mind-boggling and very disappointing", and commented that it was "hard to understand how Bev could have gone from being an active New Democrat to actually supporting and upholding the Stephen Harper agenda". Veterans Affairs critic Peter Stoffer said that Desjarlais had always worked well with MPs of all parties and that she and Thompson would "work well together".

She died in Brandon, Manitoba on March 15, 2018.

== Electoral record ==
2006 Canadian federal election: Churchill
Party	Candidate	Votes	%	Expenditures
Liberal	Tina Keeper	10,157	40.68	$75,179.50
New Democratic	Niki Ashton	7,093	28.41	$70,290.02
Independent	Bev Desjarlais	4,283	17.16	$23,042.68
Conservative	Nazir Ahmad	2,886	11.56	$23,875.20
Green	Jeff Fountain	401	1.61	$2,837.23
Independent	Brad Bodnar	146	0.58	$68.69
Total valid votes		24,966	100.00	
Total rejected ballots		90		
Turnout		25,056	55.70	
Electors on lists		44,982		
Sources: Official Results, Elections Canada and Financial Returns, Elections Canada.

2004 Canadian federal election: Churchill
Party	Candidate	Votes	%	Expenditures
New Democratic	Bev Desjarlais	8,612	43.44	$45,503.18
Liberal	Ron Evans	7,604	38.35	$61,955.23
Conservative	Bill Archer	2,999	15.13	$10,398.38
Green	C. David Nickarz	612	3.09	$646.91
Total valid votes		19,827	100.00	
Total rejected ballots		88		
Turnout		19,915	41.40	
Electors on lists		48,106		
Percentage change figures are factored for redistribution. Conservative Party percentages are contrasted with the combined Canadian Alliance and Progressive Conservative percentages from 2000.
Sources: Official Results, Elections Canada and Financial Returns, Elections Canada.

2000 Canadian federal election: Churchill
Party	Candidate	Votes	%	Expenditures
New Democratic	Bev Desjarlais	10,477	44.94	$41,854.47
Liberal	Elijah Harper	7,514	32.23	$55,871.45
Alliance	Jason Shaw	4,126	17.70	$7,444.04
Progressive Conservative	Doreen Murray	1,198	5.14	$2,722.40
Total valid votes		23,315	100.00	
Total rejected ballots		98		
Turnout		23,413	51.05	
Electors on lists		45,860		
Sources: Official Results, Elections Canada and Financial Returns, Elections Canada.

1997 Canadian federal election: Churchill
Party	Candidate	Votes	%	Expenditures
New Democratic	Bev Desjarlais	9,616	41.17	$45,525
Liberal	Elijah Harper	6,852	29.33	$59,373
Reform	Corky Peterson	4,438	19.00	$11,803
Progressive Conservative	Don Knight	2,452	10.50	$10,729
Total valid votes		23,358	100.00	
Total rejected ballots		158		
Turnout		23,516	50.25	
Electors on lists		46,801		
Sources: Official Results, Elections Canada and Financial Returns, Elections Canada.

1992 Manitoba municipal elections: Mystery Lake School Division Trustees
Candidate	Result
(x)Stan Franklin	elected
Bev Desjarlais	elected
Fred MacLean	elected
Gary McMillan	elected
(x)Margaret Pronyk	elected
(x)Ana Rodriguez	elected
(x)Morgan Svendsen	elected

Desjarlais was re-elected to the Mystery Lake School Division in 1995.

All electoral information is taken from Elections Canada. Italicized expenditures refer to submitted totals, and are presented when the final reviewed totals are not available. The list of winning candidates from 1992 is taken from the Winnipeg Free Press, 30 October 1992.

== Table of offices held ==
Preceded by Elijah Harper	Member of Parliament for Churchill; 1997–2006	Succeeded by Tina Keeper
Preceded by Gary McMillan	Chair of the Mystery Lake School Division; 1994–1997	Succeeded by Stan Franklin
Preceded by Stan Franklin, Margaret Pronyk, Ana Rodriguez, Morgan Svendsen, Ed Isaac, Paul Power and Richard Whidden	Mystery Lake School Division Trustee (with Stan Franklin and Morgan Svendsen (1992–1997), and Fred MacLean, Gary McMillan, Margaret Pronyk and Ana Rodriguez (1992–1995)); 1992–1997	Succeeded by Stan Franklin, Morgan Svendsen and five others
