= Reg Atkinson =

Canadian politician

Mayor of Brandon, Manitoba
- In office September 24, 1997 – October 23, 2002
- Preceded by: Rick Borotsik
- Succeeded by: Dave Burgess

Mayor of Hartney, Manitoba
- In office 1981–1989
- Preceded by: Allan Lougheed
- Succeeded by: Leo Peloquin

Personal details
- Born: March 9, 1948 (age 78) Hartney, Manitoba, Canada

Reginald C. Atkinson (born March 9, 1948) is a businessman and politician in Manitoba, Canada. He was the Mayor of Brandon, Manitoba, from 1997 to 2002 and campaigned for the Legislative Assembly of Manitoba in 2003.

== Early life and career ==
Atkinson was mayor of Hartney, Manitoba, from 1981 to 1989 and owned a small farming implements business in this community before relocating to Brandon in 1994. He was elected as Mayor of Brandon in a by-election on September 24, 1997, after the previous mayor, Rick Borotsik, was elected to the House of Commons of Canada. Atkinson was 49 years old.

== Mayor of Brandon ==
Hog processing

In late 1999, the president of Maple Leaf Foods announced that Brandon had been selected out of 42 possible communities for the construction of a $112 million hog processing plant. Atkinson welcomed the decision, saying that it could increase the city's population by 10,000 (to 50,000) in a short period of time. Maple Leaf selected Brandon, in part, because it was known to be one of the least expensive areas in Canada to raise hogs.

Atkinson spoke against a proposed Clean Environment Commission review of the Maple Leaf project in 1998, describing it as a stalling tactic, and supported provincial Environment Minister Jim McCrae's conclusion that a formal review would not be necessary during the construction phase. He also opposed a request from councillors in the nearby Long Plain First Nation for a federal environmental assessment. Construction of the plant began in April 1998, and operations began in August 1999.

Atkinson was easily re-elected in 1998, defeating two minor challengers who criticized aspects of the Maple Leaf deal. The following year, he the led council in approving a plan for the city to own and operate a wastewater treatment plant to serve the Maple Leaf facility. The project ultimately cost $13.5 million (some of which was paid by the province), and was derided by critics as "corporate welfare". The city administrator responded to this charge by arguing that most of the money went to improving Brandon's existing capacity for water and wastewater treatment.

Other issues

Atkinson helped coordinate other projects for the city. Simplot opened a new Brandon facility in 1999, setting up a $230 million plant for liquid and granular fertilizers. The Dutch firm Installatie Techniek Boxmeer set up a plant to manufacture livestock ventilation equipment in the same period.

Atkinson rejected at least two proposals from aboriginal groups to construct a casino in Brandon. He opposes casinos on principle, arguing that they contribute to gambling addictions and provide few social benefits in return. He also opposes the separate taxation system for urban reserve lands and believes that aboriginal Canadians should fall under the same tax apparatus as non-aboriginals. Notwithstanding his views on casinos, Atkinson supported using Video Lottery Terminals to raise revenues and rejected calls for a plebiscite on the issue.

Atkinson was a prominent supporter of a plan to move Princess Patricia's Canadian Light Infantry from Winnipeg to the Canadian Forces Base Shilo in Brandon and welcomed Defence Minister Art Eggleton's decision to approve the transfer in early 2001.

Late in his term, Atkinson led a council in approving a comprehensive by-law against indoor smoking, with no age limits or exemptions for bars.

Style

Atkinson promoted a "down-to-earth" and populist approach to politics. He wore a loud yellow shirt and happy face tie to an all-candidates debate in 1998 and was quoted as saying, "I don't use a lot of big words because I don't know them". The journal Manitoba Business once described his political style as "gregarious".

Retirement from municipal politics

Atkinson unexpectedly announced that he would not seek re-election in 2002.

Atkinson later became Reeve of the Rural Municipality of Cornwallis, which surrounds Brandon on three sides.

== Federal and provincial politics ==
Atkinson sought the Canadian Alliance nomination to contest Brandon—Souris in the 2000 federal election. He unexpectedly lost to Gary Nestibo.

He campaigned for the Legislative Assembly of Manitoba in 2003 as the Progressive Conservative candidate in Brandon West and lost to New Democratic Party incumbent Scott Smith by a wide margin.

== Electoral record ==
2003 Manitoba general election: Brandon West
Party	Candidate	Votes	%	±%	Expenditures
New Democratic	Scott Smith	5,210	61.02	11.76	$20,721.62
Progressive Conservative	Reg Atkinson	2,982	34.93	-10.79	$15,828.88
Liberal	Candace Sigurdson	346	4.05	-0.04	$2,086.52
Total valid votes		8,538	–	–	
Rejected		28	–		
Eligible voters / turnout		14,174	60.43	-12.70	
Source(s) Source: Manitoba. Chief Electoral Officer (2003). Statement of Votes for the 38th Provincial General Election, June 3, 2003 (PDF) (Report). Winnipeg: Elections Manitoba.

1998 Brandon municipal election: Mayor of Brandon
Candidate	Votes	%
(x)Reg Atkinson	7,752	78.28
Wayne Langlois	1,267	12.79
Dave Kattenburg	884	8.93
Total votes cast	9,903	100.00

113 of 121 polls reporting

Brandon, Manitoba municipal by-election, September 24, 1997: Mayor of Brandon
Candidate	Votes	%
Reg Atkinson	elected	-
Dan Munroe	about 200 votes behind	-
Scott Smith	about 400 votes behind	-
Geoff Borden		-
three other candidates	not listed	-

Atkinson was elected mayor of Hartney in either 1980 or 1981 and re-elected in 1983 and 1986.

All provincial election information is taken from Elections Manitoba. The 1998 mayoral results are taken from the Winnipeg Free Press, 29 October 1998, A13. The final results did not significantly change Atkinson's margin of victory.
