= Jason DesJarlais =

American footballer player and coach

Current position
- Title: Pro scout
- Team: Jacksonville Jaguars
- Conference: AFC South

Playing career
- 1992–1995: Montana Western
- Position: Defensive lineman

Coaching career (HC unless noted)
- 1996: Montana Western (DL)
- 1997–1998: Humboldt State (DL)
- 1999: San Diego (DL)
- 2000–2001: Bates (DL)
- 2002–2004: San Diego (DC / interim HC)
- 2006: Yale (ST)

Administrative career (AD unless noted)
- 2007–2023: Jacksonville Jaguars (college scout)
- 2024–present: Jacksonville Jaguars (pro scout)

Head coaching record
- Overall: 3–0

Accomplishments and honors

Championships
- 1 PFL North Division (2003)

Jason DesJarlais is an American football scout, former player and coach. He is a pro scout for the Jacksonville Jaguars of the National Football League (NFL). DesJarlais served as the interim head football coach at the University of San Diego for the final three games of the 2003 season following the firing of Kevin McGarry.

DesJarlais played college football at Western Montana College—now known as the University of Montana Western.

== Head coaching record ==
| Year | Team | Overall | Conference | Standing | Bowl/playoffs |
|---|---|---|---|---|---|
San Diego Toreros (Pioneer Football League) (2003)
| 2003 | San Diego | 3–0 (Note: Kevin McGarry served as San Diego's head coach for the first seven games of the 2003 season before he was fired. DesJarlais was appointed interim head coach for the remainder of the season. San Diego finished the year 8–2 overall and 3–1 in conference play.) | 2–0 | T–1st (North) | |
| San Diego: | | 3–0 | 2–0 | | |
| Total: | | 3–0 | | | |
National championship Conference title Conference division title or championship game berth
