= 1989 Manitoba municipal elections =

The 1989 Manitoba municipal elections were held on October 25, 1989 to elect mayors, councillors and school trustees in various communities throughout Manitoba, Canada.

== Cities ==
=== Brandon ===
1989 Brandon municipal election: Mayor of Brandon
Candidate	Votes	%
Rick Borotsik	>6800	+50%
(x)Ken Burgess	>4000	.
Margaret Workman	<1800	.

1989 Brandon municipal election, Council, Ward Two
Candidate	Total votes	% of total votes
Jeff Harwood	elected	not listed

== Rural Municipalities ==
=== Rockwood ===
1989 Rockwood municipal election, Reeve
Candidate	Total votes	% of total votes
(incumbent)Leon Vandekerckhove	elected	not listed

1989 Rockwood municipal election, Council, Ward One
Candidate	Total votes	% of total votes
Clayton McMurren	elected	not listed

1989 Rockwood municipal election, Council, Ward Two
Candidate	Total votes	% of total votes
Gordon Appleyard	elected	not listed

1989 Rockwood municipal election, Council, Ward Three
Candidate	Total votes	% of total votes
Garnet Thievin	elected	not listed

1989 Rockwood municipal election, Council, Ward Four
Candidate	Total votes	% of total votes
Bill Docking	elected	not listed

1989 Rockwood municipal election, Council, Ward Five
Candidate	Total votes	% of total votes
Roger Hoey	elected	not listed

1989 Rockwood municipal election, Council, Ward Six
Candidate	Total votes	% of total votes
(incumbent)Alex Glowachuk	elected	not listed

Note: The official results in the Winnipeg Free Press list Docking as the elected member for the third ward, and Thievin as the elected member for the fourth. Other sources, however, suggest that this was an error.

== School Divisions ==
=== Mystery Lake ===
1989 Mystery Lake School Division Trustees
Candidate	Total votes	% of total votes
Stan Franklin	elected	.
Paul Power	elected	.
Ed Isaac	elected	.
Richard Whidden	elected	.
Margaret Pronyk	elected	.
Ana Rodriguez	elected	.
Morgan Svendsen	elected	.

- A 2003 newspaper article lists Paul Power as a consultant with Hobbs & Associates, working to maintain a rail line for the isolated community of Lynn Lake.
- Ed Isaac and Richard Whidden were not re-elected in 1992.
