= 1980 Manitoba municipal elections =

The 1980 Manitoba municipal elections were held on 22 October 1980 to elect mayors, councillors, and school trustees in various communities throughout Manitoba, Canada.

These elections took place during a period of municipal election reform in the province, which had begun with revisions of The Municipal Act in 1970 and introduction of The Local Authorities Election Act. The latter of these was amended just prior to the fall 1980 municipal elections, clarifying court districts in the event of a recount. These elections took place before The Elections Act, 1980 came into force, and so Elections Manitoba had not yet been established.

== Cities ==
=== Winnipeg ===
The Independent Citizens Election Committee (ICEC) lost its majority on the city council, with the NDP gaining seats. William Norrie was voted to continue as mayor.

=== Brandon ===
Brandon councillors elected:

- Frederick Anderson
- Richard Borotsik
- Richard Dyck
- Gene Guentert
- Audrey Martin
- Ross Martin
- W.G. McLeod
- Mike Melnyk
- Daniel Munroe
- Margaret Workman
