= 1998 Manitoba municipal elections =

The 1998 Manitoba municipal elections were held on October 28, 1998 to elect mayors, councillors and school trustees in various communities throughout Manitoba, Canada.

== Cities ==
=== Brandon ===
1998 Brandon municipal election: Mayor of Brandon
Candidate	Votes	%
(x)Reg Atkinson	7,752	78.28
Wayne Langlois	1,267	12.79
Dave Kattenburg	884	8.93
Total votes cast	9,903	100.00

Source: Winnipeg Free Press, 29 October 1998, A13, 113 of 121 polls reporting. The final results did not significantly change Atkinson's margin of victory. It is not clear if any of the council or school board results (listed below) are also incomplete.

1998 Brandon municipal election, Councillor, Ward One (Assiniboine)

Candidate	Total votes	% of total votes
Doug Paterson	422	38.89
Janet Johnson	313	28.85
Don Somerville	185	17.05
John Shopka	165	15.21
Total votes cast	1085	100.00

1998 Brandon municipal election: Councillor, Ward Two
Candidate	Votes	%
(x)Drew Caldwell	acclaimed	.

- Caldwell was elected to the Legislative Assembly of Manitoba in the 1999 provincial election, and resigned his seat on Brandon City Council. Marion Robinsong was elected as his replacement, defeating five other candidates. Robinsong is a retired teacher, and alumnus of Brandon University, and a supporter of the New Democratic Party. She had been appointed to the Board of Governors of Brandon University shortly before her election. Robinsong campaigned for Mayor of Brandon in 2002, but finished third against Dave Burgess. As of 2007, she serves on the board of directors of the Brandon Regional Health Authority.

1998 Brandon municipal election, Councillor, Ward Three (Victoria)

Candidate	Total votes	% of total votes
Todd Lumbard	acclaimed	n/a

1998 Brandon municipal election, Councillor, Ward Four (University)

Candidate	Total votes	% of total votes
(incumbent)Rick Chrest	927	68.41
Glen Kruck	428	31.59
Total votes cast	1355	100.00

1998 Brandon municipal election, Councillor, Ward Five (Meadows)

Candidate	Total votes	% of total votes
Beth Smale	615	52.84
(incumbent)Laurie MacKenzie	384	32.99
Elizabeth Archambault	165	14.17
Total votes cast	1164	100.00

1998 Brandon municipal election, Councillor, Ward Six (South Centre)

Candidate	Total votes	% of total votes
Dave Burgess	721	75.89
Grant Hamilton	155	16.32
Bob Crighton	74	07.79
Total votes cast	950	100.00

1998 Brandon municipal election: Councillor, Ward Seven
Candidate	Votes	%
(x)Scott Smith	acclaimed	.

1998 Brandon municipal election, Councillor, Ward Eight (Richmond)

Candidate	Total votes	% of total votes
(incumbent)Margo Campbell	382	44.06
Pat Bowslaugh	307	35.41
Chris Milne	178	20.53
Total votes cast	867	100.00

1998 Brandon municipal election, Councillor, Ward Nine (Riverview)

Candidate	Total votes	% of total votes
Errol Black	acclaimed	n/a

1998 Brandon municipal election, Councillor, Ward Ten (Green Acres)

Candidate	Total votes	% of total votes
(incumbent)Don Jessiman	acclaimed	n/a

1998 Brandon municipal election, School Trustees, Urban
Candidate	Total votes	% of total votes
(incumbent)Marty Snelling	5,402	10.55
(incumbent)Malcolm Jolly	5,293	10.34
(incumbent)Linda L. Ross	5,227	10.21
(incumbent)Jim Murray	5,180	10.12
Donna Young	4,412	8.62
Cheryl Burke	4,065	7.94
Lynne McCaughey	3,628	7.09
Mark Rukin	3,587	7.01
Tom Downie	3,325	6.50
Lydia Blais	3,248	6.35
Garry Cooper	3,142	6.14
Jo-Ann Pasklivich-Holder	2,900	5.67
Orest Bobei	1,778	3.47
Total votes cast	51,187	100.00

=== Winnipeg ===
See: 1998 Winnipeg municipal election

== Towns ==
=== Neepawa ===
1998 Neepawa municipal election: Mayor
Candidate	Votes	%
Ken Waddell	743	50.96
Robert Durston	715	49.04
Total valid votes	1,458	100.00

1998 Neepawa municipal election, Councillors (six elected)
Candidate	Total votes	% of total votes
(incumbent)Arnold (Bud) Birch	1,239	16.53
(incumbent)Ronald Forsman	1,193	15.92
Jim Cockburn	1,075	14.34
(incumbent)Dean Dietrich	1,059	14.13
(incumbent)Bill Stilwell	986	13.16
Terrence Volden	871	11.62
(incumbent)Ken Hermiston	856	11.42
Eli (Jim) Baryla	216	2.88
Total valid votes	7,495	100.00

Electors could votes for six candidates. Percentages are determined in relation to the total number of votes.

== Rural municipalities ==
=== Brenda ===
1998 RM Brenda municipal election, Reeve of RM Brenda
Candidate	Total votes	% of total votes
John Dickinson	accl.	.

1998 Waskada municipal election, Councillors (four elected)
Candidate	Total votes	% of total votes
Norm Adams	accl.	.
John Griffith	accl.	.
Roy Mann	accl.	.
Bob Brigden	59	70.24
Gordon Voth	25	29.76

=== Rockwood ===
1998 Rockwood municipal election, Reeve
Candidate	Total votes	% of total votes
(incumbent)Leon Vandekerckhove	accl.	.

1998 Rockwood municipal election, Council, Ward Two
Candidate	Total votes	% of total votes
(incumbent)Gordon Appleyard	accl.	.

1998 Rockwood municipal election, Council, Ward Three
Candidate	Total votes	% of total votes
(incumbent)Garnet Thievin	accl.	.

1998 Rockwood municipal election, Council, Ward Four
Candidate	Total votes	% of total votes
(incumbent)Ken Hibbitt	accl.	.

1998 Rockwood municipal election, Council, Other Wards (three members)
Candidate	Total votes	% of total votes
Nick Neumann	282	elected
Gunnar Kratzer	276	elected
(incumbent)Clayton McMurren	241	elected
Dennis Persoage	181	defeated
Jeff Tomchak	157	defeated
Harold Bond	109	defeated
(incumbent)Gilbert Good	104	defeated
Jack Fetterman	56	defeated
Ted Demeniuk	52	defeated
Douglas Valen	45	defeated

Source: Winnipeg Free Press, 29 October 1998, A13. The results in the Free Press list all candidates in alphabetical order, and do not indicate which candidates ran in specific wards.

Persoage appears to have replaced Neumann on council at some point between 1998 and 2002.

== Villages ==
=== Waskada ===
1998 Waskada municipal election, Mayor of Waskada
Candidate	Total votes	% of total votes
(incumbent)Vaughn Ramsay	accl.	.

1998 Waskada municipal election, Waskada Village Council (four members elected)
Candidate	Total votes	% of total votes
Jackie Reid	119	24.29
(incumbent)Terry Bradco	86	17.55
Anita Barker	76	15.51
Jeanette Stirling	75	15.31
Ken Austin	68	13.88
(incumbent)John Innes	66	13.47
Total valid votes	490	100.00

Electors could vote for four candidates. Percentages are determined in relation to the total number of votes.

Results are taken from the Winnipeg Free Press newspaper, 2 November 1998. The final official totals do not appear to have been significantly different.
