= Harley Desjarlais =

Harley Desjarlais is a regional Métis leader in Canada. He is a former president of the Métis Provincial Council of British Columbia, today known as Métis Nation British Columbia. However, he was suspended from that position in September 2004 for unspecified reasons.
