= 1992 Manitoba municipal elections =

The 1992 Manitoba municipal elections were held on October 28, 1992 to elect mayors, councillors and school trustees in various communities throughout Manitoba, Canada.

== Cities ==
=== Brandon ===
1992 Brandon municipal election: Mayor of Brandon
Candidate	Votes	%
(x)Rick Borotsik	accl.	.

1992 Brandon municipal election: Councillor, Ward Two
Candidate	Votes	%
Drew Caldwell	elected	not listed

=== Winnipeg ===
See: 1992 Winnipeg municipal election

== Rural Municipalities ==
=== Rockwood ===
1992 Rockwood municipal election, Reeve
Candidate	Total votes	% of total votes
(incumbent)Leon Vandekerckhove	accl.	not listed

1992 Rockwood municipal election, Council, Ward One
Candidate	Total votes	% of total votes
(incumbent)Clayton McMurren	elected	not listed

1992 Rockwood municipal election, Council, Ward Two
Candidate	Total votes	% of total votes
(incumbent)Gordon Appleyard	elected	not listed

1992 Rockwood municipal election, Council, Ward Three
Candidate	Total votes	% of total votes
(incumbent)Garnet Thievin	elected	not listed

1992 Rockwood municipal election, Council, Ward Four
Candidate	Total votes	% of total votes
(incumbent)Bill Docking	elected	not listed

1992 Rockwood municipal election, Council, Ward Five
Candidate	Total votes	% of total votes
Gilbert Good	elected	not listed

1992 Rockwood municipal election, Council, Ward Six
Candidate	Total votes	% of total votes
(incumbent)Alex Glowachuk	elected	not listed

== Villages ==
=== Waskada ===
1992 Waskada municipal election, Mayor of Waskada
Candidate	Total votes	% of total votes
Vaughn Ramsay	elected	.

1992 Waskada municipal election, Waskada Village Council (four members elected)
Candidate	Total votes	% of total votes
Ernest Mitchell	elected	.
Melvin Reney	elected	.
David Kreklewich	elected	.
Glenn McGregor	elected	.

Source: Winnipeg Free Press newspaper, 29 October 1992.

==== Vaughn Ramsay ====
Ramsay is a farmer. He was a candidate for the Liberal Party of Canada in the 1979 federal election, and finished third in the Brandon—Souris riding. He was Liberal candidate for Arthur-Virden in the 2003 provincial elections. He served as Mayor of Waskada, a village in southwestern Manitoba of fewer than 300 people, from 1992 to 2006. In 1998, he expressed concern that a proposal to close the local school could result in the destruction of his community. The school remained open, although the closure of N.M. Paterson & Sons grain elevator the following year was a setback for the local economy. He did not run for re-election in 2006.

== School Divisions ==
1992 Manitoba municipal elections: Mystery Lake School Division Trustees
Candidate	Result
(x)Stan Franklin	elected
Bev Desjarlais	elected
Fred MacLean	elected
Gary McMillan	elected
(x)Margaret Pronyk	elected
(x)Ana Rodriguez	elected
(x)Morgan Svendsen	elected

- Stan Franklin chaired the Manitoba Health Department's mental health program for northern Manitoba. He became Chair of the Mystery Lake Division in 1997, after Bev Desjarlais was elected to the House of Commons.
- Fred MacLean was not a member of the previous board.
- Gary McMillan was elected to the Mystery Lake School Board in 1992, and was its chair before Bev Desjarlais was selected for the position in 1994. In February 1994, he announced that two area teachers had been suspended for fighting in front of their students.
- Margaret Pronyk operates a bookkeeping organization in Northern Manitoba. She has served as president of BPW Canada, has lobbied in favour of progressive pay equity policies, and was named BPW Canada Woman of the Year in 2004. She was also the Chief Electoral Officer for the northern provincial constituency of Thompson in 1999. She indicated that she required icebreakers to transport ballot boxes, and said that her financial resources in such a large area were stretched thin. She was chair of the Mystery Lake School Division by 2000, and appears to have been elected to the Thompson municipal council in 2002.
- Ana Rodriguez holds a teaching degree from the University of Chile. She was a Mystery Lake School Trustee from 1981 to 1995, a member of the board of governors at Keewatin Community College from 2001 to 2004, and a member of the steering committee for the University College of the North from 2003 to 2004. In 2004, she was appointed to the twelve-member interim council of University College of the North. Rodriguez has a particular interest in adult education, multiculturalism and community development.
- Morgan Svendsen is a former president of the United Steelworkers of America in Thompson, and was very active in the local labour community.
