= Kevin McGarry (American football) =

American football player and coach

Current position
- Title: On-campus recruiting coordinator
- Team: San Diego State
- Conference: MW

Biographical details
- Born: c. 1956

Playing career
- 1974–1975: Saddleback
- 1976–1977: San Diego
- Positions: Wide receiver, defensive back

Coaching career (HC unless noted)
- 1978–1979: San Diego (assistant)
- 1980–1995: San Diego (DC)
- 1996–2003: San Diego
- 2009–present: San Diego State (assistant)

Head coaching record
- Overall: 39–38

Kevin McGarry (born c. 1956) is an American football coach. He has been an assistant coach at San Diego State University since 2011. McGarry served as the head football coach at the University of San Diego from 1996 to 2003, compiling a record of 39–37.

McGarry played college football at Saddleback College from 1974 to 1975 and the University of San Diego from 1976 to 1977. He joined San Diego's coaching staff the following year and served as an assistant coach for 18 years from 1978 to 1995. McGarry was fired from his post at San Diego after seven games during the 2003 season.

== Head coaching record ==
Year	Team	Overall	Conference	Standing	Bowl/playoffs
San Diego Toreros (Pioneer Football League) (1996–2003)
1996	San Diego	4–6	1–4	T–5th	
1997	San Diego	8–3	4–1	2nd	
1996	San Diego	2–8	0–4	5th	
1999	San Diego	5–5	1–3	4th	
2000	San Diego	4–6	1–3	4th	
2001	San Diego	6–3	2–2	3rd (North)	
2002	San Diego	5–5	3–1	2nd (North)	
2003	San Diego	5–2 (Note: McGarry was fired after the first seven games of the 2003 season. Jason DesJarlais was appointed interim head coach for the remainder of the season. San Diego finished the year 8–2 overall and 3–1 in conference play sharing the Pioneer Football League's North Division title with Valparaiso.)	1–1	(North)	
San Diego:		39–38	13–19		
Total:		39–38			
