= Bob Desjarlais =

Canadian trade unionist (1954–2021)

- Born: December 29, 1954; Qu'Appelle, Saskatchewan, Canada
- Died: March 10, 2021 (aged 66); Moose Jaw, Saskatchewan, Canada
- Known for: President USWA Local 6166
- Spouse(s): Bev Desjarlais (divorced); Christie Desjarlais
- Children: 4

Bob Desjarlais was a prominent labour leader in Thompson, Manitoba, Canada, having served as president of the United Steelworkers of America Local 6166 in the 1990s.

== Biography ==
He represented Inco workers through difficult contract negotiations in 1999, which included an extended lockout and community polarization. Shortly after the contract was settled, Inco announced that it would expand operations, and keep the Birchtree Mine open for at least another fifteen years. Desjarlais negotiated a 4.3% wage increase for workers in 2002, and strongly endorsed a new three-year contract in 2005. He has also been involved in labour activism at the provincial, national and international levels. In 1996, he represented the Steelworkers in merger talks with the United Auto Workers and the International Association of Machinists. Four years later, he was cheered at a meeting of the Canadian Labour Congress for criticizing Buzz Hargrove's suggestion that the CLC consider withdrawing its support from the New Democratic Party. He supported Bill Blaikie for the federal NDP leadership later in the same year. Within the Manitoba New Democratic Party, Desjarlais has been a vocal advocate for anti-scab legislation. He has also been active in aboriginal issues, and promoted an urban reserve for Thompson in 2002.
