= 1986 Manitoba municipal elections =

The 1986 Manitoba municipal elections were held in October 1986 to elect mayors, councillors and school trustees in various communities throughout Manitoba, Canada.

== Cities ==
=== Brandon ===
1986 Brandon election, Ward Four Councillor
Candidate	Total votes	% of total votes
Lynne Little	elected	not listed

- Little appears to have served as a Brandon city councillor from 1986 to 1989. She may have been elected in a 1985 by-election prior to that.

=== Winnipeg ===
1986 Winnipeg election, Mayor of Winnipeg
Candidate	Total votes	% of total votes
Bill Norrie	78,998	55.46
Russell Doern	48,567	34.1
Peter Juba	4,955	3.48
Nick Ternette	3,060	2.14
William Hawryluk	1,737	1.22
Gilles Rivard	1,268	0.89
Allen Bleich	1,199	0.84
Garry Fast	1,175	0.82
Barry Kohn	898	0.63
A. Christian Swan	561	0.39

== Towns ==
=== Hartney ===
1986 Hartney election, Mayor of Hartney
Candidate	Total votes	% of total votes
(incumbent)Reg Atkinson	elected	not listed

== See also ==
- 1986 Winnipeg Municipal Election
