= 1983 Manitoba municipal elections =

The 1983 Manitoba municipal elections were held in October 1983 to elect mayors, councillors, and school trustees in various communities throughout Manitoba, Canada.

== Towns ==
=== Hartney ===
1983 Hartney election, Mayor of Hartney
Candidate	Total votes	% of total votes
(incumbent)Reg Atkinson	elected	not listed
