= List of mayors of Brandon, Manitoba =

This is a list of mayors of Brandon, Manitoba.

- 1882–1884 - Thomas Mayne Daly
- 1885–1886 - James A. Smart
- 1887 - Charles Adams
- 1888–1889 - Alexander C. Fraser
- 1890–1891 - Andrew Kelly
- 1892–1894 - Dr. John McDiarmid
- 1895–1896 - James A. Smart
- 1897–1898 - Ezekiel Evans
- 1899 - Alexander C. Fraser
- 1900 - Dr. John McDiarmid
- 1901–1902 - Alexander C. Fraser
- 1903–1904 - Robert Hall
- 1905–1906 - John W. Fleming
- 1907–1908 - Stephen E. Clement
- 1909–1910 - Henry L. Adolph
- 1911–1913 - John W. Fleming
- 1914 - Joseph Henry Hughes
- 1915–1918 - H.W. Cater
- 1919 - A.R. McDiarmid
- 1920–1921 - George Dinsdale
- 1932–1933 - E. Fotheringham
- 1934–1937 - H.W. Cater
- 1938–1943 - F.H. Young
- 1944–1945 - L.H. McDorman
- 1946–1951 - Frank T. Williamson
- 1952–1955 - James Creighton
- 1956–1957 - Dr. Stuart Schultz
- 1958–1961 - James Creighton
- 1962–1969 - Stephen A. Magnacca
- 1970–1974 - W.K. Wilton
- 1975–1977 - Elwood C. Gorrie
- 1978 - G.D. Box
- 1979–1989 - Ken Burgess
- 1989–1997 - Rick Borotsik
- 1997–2002 - Reg Atkinson
- 2002–2010 - Dave Burgess
- 2010–2014 - Shari Decter Hirst
- 2014–2022 - Rick Chrest
- 2022–present - Jeff Fawcett
