= Rick Chrest =

Canadian politician

32nd Mayor of Brandon
- In office November 6, 2014 – October 27, 2022
- Preceded by: Shari Decter Hirst
- Succeeded by: Jeff Fawcett

Member of the Brandon City Council for University – Ward 4
- In office 1995–2006
- Preceded by: Not applicable
- Succeeded by: Not applicable

Rick Chrest is a Canadian politician who was elected mayor of Brandon, Manitoba in the 2014 municipal election defeating incumbent Shari Decter Hirst.

Prior to his election as mayor, Chrest served three terms on Brandon City Council for eleven years from 1995 to 2006 for University - Ward 4.

Chrest was acclaimed as mayor for a second term in the 2018 municipal election. This was the first uncontested mayoral race in the city in 26 years.
