= Rick Borotsik =

Canadian politician (born 1950)

Member of the Legislative Assembly of Manitoba for Brandon West
- In office May 22, 2007 – October 4, 2011
- Preceded by: Scott Smith
- Succeeded by: Reg Helwer

Member of Parliament for Brandon—Souris
- In office June 2, 1997 – May 23, 2004
- Preceded by: Glen McKinnon
- Succeeded by: Merv Tweed

Mayor of Brandon, Manitoba
- In office October 25, 1989 – 1997
- Preceded by: Ken Burgess
- Succeeded by: Reg Atkinson

Personal details
- Born: September 8, 1950 (age 75) Brandon, Manitoba, Canada
- Party: Progressive Conservative → Conservative (federal); Progressive Conservative Party of Manitoba (provincial)

Rick Borotsik (born September 8, 1950) is a politician in Manitoba, Canada. He served as Mayor of Brandon from 1989 to 1997, was a member of the House of Commons of Canada from 1997 to 2004, and was elected to the Legislative Assembly of Manitoba in 2007. Borotsik is a member of the Progressive Conservative Party of Manitoba.

== Early life and career ==
Borotsik was born to a Ukrainian Canadian family in Brandon, was raised in that city, and graduated from Brandon University in 1971. He was elected to the Brandon City Council in 1977 and served for three terms before standing down in 1985.

He joined the Progressive Conservative Party of Canada in 1978. Borotsik sought the provincial PC nomination to run in Brandon West in the buildup to the 1986 provincial election, but lost to Jim McCrae.

Borotsik was an employee of the shopping centre firm Bramalea Limited during the 1980s. He was transferred from Brandon to Calgary in 1985, and again to the firm's head office in Toronto one year later. He remained the city for three years, and became director of 32 centres. Finding it difficult to adjust to life in Toronto, he returned to Brandon in 1989. He ran for mayor in that year's municipal election, and won an upset victory over four-term incumbent Ken Burgess.

== Mayor of Brandon ==
A colourful and charming figure, Borotsik was elected on a platform of aggressive municipal development and became known for his efforts to promote the city. He brought the Canada Games and the World Curling Championships to Brandon, and presided over a period of significant agribusiness expansion. He was also given credit for saving the city's airport.

He supported the introduction of Video Lottery Terminals into Brandon, and pressured the provincial government to turn over VLT revenues to the municipalities. He also called for a casino to be set up in the city, and endorsed unrestricted Sunday shopping. In 1992, he supported the Charlottetown Accord on constitutional reform.

== Member of Parliament ==
First term (1997–2000)

Borotsik sought and won the Progressive Conservative Party of Canada's nomination for Brandon—Souris in the 1997 federal election. The party had been reduced to only two seats in the previous election, and was trying to rebuild its support base. Borotsik was a strong supporter of party leader Jean Charest, and was considered a star candidate. He indicated that he opposed the ideology of the rival Reform Party of Canada, a party further right than the old PCs, which he described as a "flash-in-the-pan regional party" with no national perspective. He was narrowly elected over the Reform candidate, while pushing Liberal incumbent Glen McKinnon into third place.

The Liberals, led by Prime Minister Jean Chrétien, were re-elected to a second consecutive majority government in the 1997 election, while the Progressive Conservatives won twenty seats for a fifth-place finish. Borotsik was his party's only elected representative from western Canada. He served successively as critic for agriculture, the Canadian Wheat Board and western economic diversification, and had unofficial duties for the western provinces.

Charest resigned as party leader in 1998, despite requests from Borotsik and other MPs that he remain in the position. Borotsik was subsequently chosen as national caucus chairman, and endorsed former prime minister Joe Clark's successful bid to succeed Charest as leader. Borotsik was also an opponent of the United Alternative, a Reform-sponsored drive for a new political party that resulted in the creation of the Canadian Alliance.

Borotsik opposed the Canadian gun registry, which he described as unworkable. He endorsed a 1998 bill that reversed Louis Riel's conviction for treason, and recognized him as a Father of Confederation. Later, he broke with his party's official position to support the Chrétien government's Clarity Bill. There was speculation that Borotsik would seek the leadership of the Progressive Conservative Party of Manitoba in 2000, but he declined.

Second term (2000–04)

Borotsik was narrowly re-elected in the 2000 federal election over a candidate of the Canadian Alliance, as the Liberals won a third consecutive majority government nationally. The Progressive Conservatives fell to twelve seats and remained the fifth-largest party in parliament, narrowly avoiding the loss of official party status that some had feared. Borotsik was subsequently named as party whip and Critic for Agriculture, Indian Affairs and the Canadian Wheat Board.

Borotsik took part in preliminary discussions between the Progressive Conservatives and the Canadian Alliance in early 2001. He said that a "mutual compromise" would have to be reached before the next election to prevent the Liberals from remaining in power. No agreements were reached, and Borotsik later called for disgruntled Canadian Alliance members to rejoin the Progressive Conservative Party.

Clark resigned as Progressive Conservative leader in mid-2002. There were rumours that Borotsik would run to succeed him, but he declined and endorsed Jim Prentice, a lawyer from Calgary who had not held elected office to that point. Prentice lost to Peter MacKay on the final ballot of the party's 2003 leadership convention; Borotsik resigned as party whip, but remained Agriculture Critic.

During this period, Borotsik surprised some political observers by declaring his support for the legalization of same-sex marriage. He also endorsed the principles of public health care and employment insurance, and became associated with the Red Tory wing of his party.

MacKay and Canadian Alliance leader Stephen Harper announced plans to merge their parties in late 2003. Borotsik strongly opposed this decision, and said that he would not be a candidate for the merged party if Stephen Harper was chosen as its leader. He openly considered joining the Liberals once the merger was finalized, and was on hand to provide "moral support" for Progressive Conservative MP Scott Brison when he announced his own defection to the Liberal Party.

Borotsik ultimately chose to sit with the merged Conservative Party of Canada until the next election, but made no secret of his opposition to Stephen Harper and the new party's social conservatism. He turned down an offer to become Agriculture Critic in Harper's shadow cabinet, and did not stand in the 2004 campaign. Just before election day, he publicly endorsed the Liberals. Borotsik supported Belinda Stronach's decision to leave the Conservatives for the Liberals in 2005, and indicated that he would consider running for either the Liberal Party of Canada or the Progressive Conservative Party of Manitoba at some time in the future.

== Member of the provincial legislature ==
Stuart Murray announced his resignation as leader of the Progressive Conservative Party of Manitoba in 2005. Some considered Borotsik as a possible replacement, but he quickly ruled himself out as a candidate. In June 2006, however, he announced that he would run for the party in the next provincial campaign.

He was narrowly elected in the 2007 election, defeating New Democratic Party cabinet minister Scott Smith by 56 votes in Brandon West. Borotsik provoked some controversy when he announced that he favoured an end to Manitoba's tuition freeze; the party's official policy was to keep the freeze in place.

The New Democratic Party was re-elected to a third consecutive majority government in the 2007 election, and Borotsik entered the legislature as a member of the Official Opposition. In September 2007, party leader Hugh McFadyen appointed him to the high-profile position of Finance Critic. Later in the year, he described Manitoba's increasing debt as an economic danger signal.

Borotsik was not a candidate in the 2011 Manitoba general election.

== Electoral record ==
2007 Manitoba general election: Brandon West
Party	Candidate	Votes	%	±%	Expenditures
Progressive Conservative	Rick Borotsik	4,730	48.04	13.12	$29,059.52
New Democratic	Scott Smith	4,674	47.48	-13.55	$27,506.06
Liberal	M. J. Willard	398	4.04	-0.01	$6,098.53
Communist	Lisa Gallagher	43	0.44	–	
Total valid votes		9,845	–	–	
Rejected		39	–		
Eligible voters / turnout		14,796	66.80	6.37	
Source(s) Source: Manitoba. Chief Electoral Officer (2007). Statement of Votes for the 39th Provincial General Election, May 22, 2007 (PDF) (Report). Winnipeg: Elections Manitoba.

2000 Canadian federal election: Brandon—Souris
Party	Candidate	Votes	%	±%	Expenditures
Progressive Conservative	Rick Borotsik	13,707	37.41	+1.82	$43,992.66
Alliance	Gary Nestibo	11,678	31.87	−0.13	$59,234.19
Liberal	Dick Scott	6,544	17.86	+0.13	$42,860.78
New Democratic	Errol Black	4,518	12.33	−1.09	$13,475.28
Communist	Lisa Gallagher	102	0.28		$383.70
Christian Heritage	Colin Atkins	94	0.26	−0.36	$1,000.00
Total valid votes		36,643	100.00		
Total rejected ballots		116			
Turnout		36,759	67.04	+0.16	
Electors on the lists		54,829			
Sources: Official Results, Elections Canada and Financial Returns, Elections Canada.

1997 Canadian federal election: Brandon—Souris
Party	Candidate	Votes	%	±%	Expenditures
Progressive Conservative	Rick Borotsik	13,216	35.59	+13.18	$51,629
Reform	Ed Agnew	11,883	32.00	+1.63	$52,341
Liberal	Glen McKinnon	6,583	17.73	-15.27	$33,249
New Democratic	Jennifer Howard	4,983	13.42	+1.56	$12,213
Independent	Geoff Gorf Borden	244	0.66		$19
Christian Heritage	Colin Atkins	229	0.62	-0.3	$34
Total valid votes		37,138	100.00		
Total rejected ballots		135			
Turnout		37,273	66.88		
Electors on the lists		55,735			
Sources: Official Results, Elections Canada and Financial Returns, Elections Canada.

1995 Brandon municipal election: Mayor of Brandon
Candidate	Votes	%
(x)Rick Borotsik	11,299	80.17
Stephen Downes	1,620	11.49
Geoff Borden	1,175	8.34
Total votes cast	14,094	100.00

1992 Brandon municipal election: Mayor of Brandon
Candidate	Votes	%
(x)Rick Borotsik	accl.	.

1989 Brandon municipal election: Mayor of Brandon
Candidate	Votes	%
Rick Borotsik	>6800	+50%
(x)Ken Burgess	>4000	.
Margaret Workman	<1800	.

1983 Brandon municipal election: Councillor, Ward Four
Candidate	Votes	%
(x)Rick Borotsik	elected	.

1980 Brandon municipal election: Councillor, Ward Three (?)
Candidate	Votes	%
(x)Rick Borotsik	elected	.

Note: Reports in the Winnipeg Free Press newspaper do not indicate if Borotsik was elected in Ward Three or Ward Four in the 1980 Brandon election. In the absence of evidence to the contrary, this article assumes the former.

1977 Brandon municipal election: Councillor, Ward Three
Candidate	Votes	%
Rick Borotsik	704	40.91
Jonathan Robin Toogood	508	29.52
(x)Paul Hudy	404	23.47
Lew Heming	105	6.10
Total votes cast	1,721	100.00
