= 2002 Manitoba municipal elections =

The 2002 Manitoba municipal elections were held on October 23, 2002 to elect mayors, councillors and school trustees in various communities throughout Manitoba, Canada.

== Brandon ==
2002 Brandon municipal election, School Trustees, Urban
Candidate	Total votes	% of total votes
Patricia Bowslaugh	placed first	.
(incumbent)Malcolm Jolly	elected	.
(incumbent)Cheryl Burke	elected	.
(incumbent)Jim Murray	elected	.
(incumbent)Linda L. Ross	elected	.
(incumbent)Donna Young	elected	.
(incumbent)Marty Snelling	elected	.
Howard Hoy	elected	.
(incumbent)Lynne McCaughey	defeated	.
(incumbent)Mark Rukin	defeated	.
Eric de Pass	defeated	.
Terry Erskine	defeated	.
Five other candidates	defeated	.

- Patricia Bowslaugh is a school principal. She sought election to Brandon City Council in the 1998 municipal election, and was narrowly defeated by incumbent councillor Margo Campbell in Ward Eight. She was elected to the Brandon School Board in 2002, finishing first in a field of seventeen candidates, and spearheaded an effort to provide students with academic credits for their work on science projects. She did not seek re-election in 2006. As of 2007, she is president of the Retired Teachers Association of Manitoba.
- Malcolm Jolly was born and educated in England, and received Bachelor of Arts and Master of Arts degrees from Queens University at Oxford. He moved to Canada in 1967, and taught high school history in Brandon until 1990. He was first elected as a trustee in 1992, and was re-elected in 1995, 1998 and 2002. In 1998 and 1999, he was part of a majority of trustees who refused to cut services to balance the division's budget. He served as board chair during his third term. He criticized the provincial government's forced merger of school boards in 2002, arguing that the province was attempting increase its control over the boards. He was the author of a book entitled "Freely We Serve: The Effective School Board". Jolly died on March 11, 2003. His widow, Bea Jolly, was elected to the Brandon School Board in 2006.
- Donna Young served as a trustee at some time before the 1995 election, was re-elected in 1998, and was returned again in 2002. She was a Superstore employee at the time of the 1998 election. Young opposed the board's tax increases in 1999, at a time when other trustees argued that the increases were necessary to avoid service cuts. She did not seek re-election in 2006.
- Howard Hoy is a schoolteacher in Brandon. In 1998, he led a group of students in a letter-writing campaign to have seat belts placed in school buses. He was elected to the Brandon School Board in 2002, and did not seek re-election in 2006.
- Mark Rukin was elected to the Brandon School Board in 1998, and was defeated in 2002. He identified himself as a meat cutter in his first campaign. He supported a tax increase to provide improved services in 1999.

post-election changes

School trustee Malcolm Jolly died on 11 March 2003. A by-election was held to choose his replacement.

2002 Brandon municipal election, School Trustees, Urban
Candidate	Total votes	% of total votes
Lynne McCaughey	606	.
Joe Kay	574	.
Three other candidates	defeated	.

- Lynne McCaughey was first elected to the Brandon School Board in 1998, and was defeated in her bid for re-election in 2002. She was returned in a 2003 by-election, and did not stand for re-election in 2006. She identified herself as a homemaker during her first campaign.

== Elton ==
2002 Elton municipal election, Councillor, Ward 3
Candidate	Total votes	% of total votes
Harvey Paterson	66	55.93
(incumbent)Cyril Stott	52	44.07

== Neepawa ==
2002 Neepawa municipal election: Mayor
Candidate	Votes	%
Robert Durston	949	63.78
(x)Ken Waddell	539	36.22
Total valid votes	1,488	100.00

2002 Neepawa municipal election, Councillors (six elected)
Candidate	Total votes	% of total votes
Wayne Hollier	1,302	17.84
(incumbent)Ronald Forsman	1,174	16.08
John Douglas	1,106	15.15
(incumbent)Bill Stilwell	981	13.44
(incumbent)Dean Dietrich	961	13.16
(incumbent)Terrence Volden	921	12.62
Monty Simon	855	11.71
Total valid votes	7,300	100.00

Electors could votes for six candidates. Percentages are determined in relation to the total number of votes.

== Selkirk ==
2002 Selkirk municipal election, Councillors (six elected)
Candidate	Total votes	% of total votes
Pat Pruden	1,813	12.03
(incumbent)Chris Pawley	1,704	11.31
John Buffie	1,589	10.54
(incumbent)Darlene Swiderski	1,532	10.17
Duane Nicol	1,348	8.95
(incumbent)Marlene Cook	1,269	8.42
Peggy Davies	1,239	8.22
David Zirk	1,171	7.77
Conor Lloyd	1,112	7.38
Janice Lucek	979	6.50
Vivian Whiteway	492	3.26
Jack Park	478	3.17
Mike Risk	343	2.28
Total valid votes	15,069	100.00

Electors could votes for six candidates. Percentages are determined in relation to the total number of votes.

== Somerset ==
2002 Somerset municipal election, Mayor of Somerset
Candidate	Total votes	% of total votes
Paul-Emile Labossiere	accl.	.

- Paul-Emile Labossiere is a supply-parts clerk, and has served on the Somerset Village Council and as Mayor of Somerset. He was active in the Progressive Conservative Party of Manitoba and the Progressive Conservative Party of Canada during the 1990s, and worked on campaigns for Charlie Meyer and Denis Rocan. He sought the federal Progressive Conservative nomination for Portage—Lisgar in the buildup to the 1997 election, but lost to Brian Pallister.

== Waskada ==
2002 Waskada municipal election, Mayor of Waskada
Candidate	Total votes	% of total votes
(incumbent)Vaughn Ramsay	accl.	.

2002 Waskada municipal election, Waskada Village Council (four members elected)
Candidate	Total votes	% of total votes
Allan Wanner	133	24.31
(incumbent)Jackie Reid	121	22.12
(incumbent)Jeanette Stirling	117	21.39
Leona Devuyst	105	19.20
Don Wickham	58	10.60
John Jones	13	2.38
Total valid votes	547	100.00

Electors could vote for four candidates. Percentages are determined in relation to the total number of votes.

Results are taken from the Winnipeg Free Press newspaper, 24 October 2002 and 28 October 2002. The final official totals do not appear to have been significantly different.

== Winnipeg ==
See: 2002 Winnipeg municipal election
