= Brandon City Council =

Governing body for the city of Brandon, Manitoba, Canada

Brandon City Council is the governing body for the city of Brandon, Manitoba, Canada. The council consists of the mayor and 10 ward councillors.

== Current Brandon City Council ==
As of the 2026 Manitoba municipal elections

- Mayor, Jeff Fawcett
- Ward 1 Councillor, Ron Shaluk
- Ward 2 Councillor, Deveryn Ross
- Ward 3 Councillor, Craig Shanks
- Ward 4 Councillor, Shaun Cameron
- Ward 5 Councillor, Greg Hildebrand
- Ward 6 Councillor, Bruce Luebke
- Ward 7 Councillor, Shawn Berry
- Ward 8 Councillor, Jason Splett
- Ward 9 Councillor, Norah Woychyshyn
- Ward 10 Councillor, Tyson Tame

== See also ==
- List of mayors of Brandon, Manitoba
