= Kathy McNeil =

Kathy McNeil may refer to:

- Kathy Wells-McNeil (born 1971/72), Canadian entrepreneur and political candidate
- Kate McNeil (born 1959), American actress
