= Canadian Action Party candidates in the 2000 Canadian federal election =

The Canadian Action Party fielded a number of candidates in the 2000 federal election, none of whom were elected. Information about these candidates may be found here.

== Ontario ==
=== Ross Elliott (Hastings—Frontenac—Lennox and Addington) ===
Elliott (born July 7, 1957, in Montreal, Quebec) is a founder of Homesol Building Solutions. www.homesol.ca He studied Bio-Science at Concordia University and Environmental Science at the University of Waterloo. Ross ran on a platform of restoring support to Canada's health and education system, while opposing the imposition of the Canadian gun registry. He also stressed the fact that he was not a professional politician. He received 388 votes (0.61%), finishing sixth against Canadian Alliance candidate Scott Reid.

In 2002, Elliott helped to design the world's first bubble greenhouse (Ottawa Citizen, 22 June 2002). He has estimated that its heating costs are 75% lower than those of a standard greenhouse (Toronto Star, 27 January 2005).

=== Kathy Wells-McNeil (Sudbury) ===
Wells-McNeil was raised in Sudbury. She is a graduate of Cambrian College's nursing school, and set up a private home care agency called Total Nursing Care in 1995. She was named Sudbury's Female Entrepreneur of the Year in 2000, and Young Entrepreneur of the Year in 2004 and 2005. In 2005, she set up a $1,000 nursing bursary at Cambrian College.

Wells-McNeil was previously known as Kathy McNeil, and ran under that name in the 1997 federal election. She was the first candidate of the Canadian Action Party to be nominated in any riding, and was the party's youngest candidate in 1997. She campaigned in support of public medicare, citing increased reliance on businesses such as her own as evidence that the public system was in need of repair.

Electoral record
Election	Division	Party	Votes	%	Place	Winner
2000 federal	Sudbury	Canadian Action Party	502	1.25	5/6	Diane Marleau, Liberal
2004 federal	Sudbury	Canadian Action Party	215	0.62	6/7	Diane Marleau, Liberal
