= Canadian Action Party candidates in the 1997 Canadian federal election =

The Canadian Action Party fielded a number of candidates in the 1997 federal election, none of whom were elected. Information about these candidates may be found on this page.

== Ontario ==
=== Chatham-Kent—Essex: Victor Knight ===
Victor Knight was a special education teacher in Kent County. He first ran for parliament in the 1993 federal election as a candidate of Mel Hurtig's National Party.

During the mid-1990s, Knight was the co-chairman of the Canadian Council on National Issues and a member of the Committee on Monetary and Economic Reform. In 1995, he wrote an opinion piece arguing that Canada's economic problems could be traced to policy decisions made in the late 1960s and early 1970s, when the federal government uncapped interest rates and financed public expenditures as debt-credit. Knight also argued that the Bank of Canada should be made the sole creator of Canada's money supply. In a follow-up piece, he argued that the Bank of Canada should create the credit necessary to finance the debt of Ontario Hydro.

Knight ran as an independent candidate in a federal by-election in 1996, against prominent national politician Sheila Copps. His campaign was centered around the historical issues relating to Canada's debt. He also spoke against consumer taxes such as the Goods and Services Tax on the grounds that they prevent the spending that can stimulate an economy, and criticized the federal government's cuts to social service programs. Unusually for a fringe candidate, Knight spent over $16,000 on this campaign. Most of the money was donated by Bill Loewen, who was the primary donor to the National Party in the 1993 election.

Knight joined the newly formed Canadian Action Party for the 1997 federal election.

Electoral record
Election	Division	Party	Votes	%	Place	Winner
1993 federal	Kent	National	1,014	2.79	5/6	Rex Crawford, Liberal
federal by-election, June 17, 1996	Hamilton East	Independent	70	0.26	10/13	Sheila Copps, Liberal
1997 federal	Chatham-Kent—Essex	Canadian Action	470	1.10	6/7	Jerry Pickard, Liberal

=== Nickel Belt: Don Scott ===
Don Scott received 369 votes, finishing fifth against Liberal incumbent Ray Bonin.

=== Parry Sound-Muskoka: Jackie Raney ===
Jackie Raney identified as a homemaker. She received 236 votes (0.55%), finishing sixth against Liberal incumbent Andy Mitchell.

=== St. Catharines: Glenn L. Malcolm ===
Malcolm is a frequent candidate for public office. He was originally a member of the Liberal Party, and can trace his family connections to the party back more than 150 years. He served on the Scugog Township council from 1988 to 1991, and he made an unsuccessful bid for mayor of the community in 1991. He also sought the Liberal Party nomination for Durham in leadup to the 1993 election, but lost to Alex Shepherd by forty-five votes.

Malcolm left the Liberal Party in 1996 to campaign against cabinet minister Sheila Copps in a federal by-election. "This election is my way of protesting," he was quoted as saying. "Loyalty to the party takes second place to loyalty to the country". He called for the federal government to scrap the national Goods and Services Tax (GST) and to renegotiate the country's free trade agreement with the United States of America (Hamilton Spectator, 8 June 1996). He later joined the Canadian Action Party for the 1997 election.

In late 2003, Malcolm was listed as an ordained minister and big rig truck driver (Toronto Star, 6 November 2003).

Electoral record
Election	Division	Party	Votes	%	Place	Winner
1988 municipal	Scugog Township, council	n.a	elected		.	himself
1991 municipal	Scugog Township, mayor	n.a	defeated		.	.
1994 municipal	Brock Township, council	n.a	defeated		2/2	Yvonne Christie
federal by-election, June 17, 1996	Hamilton East	Independent	113	0.42	8/13	Sheila Copps, Liberal
1997 federal	St. Catharines	Canadian Action	308	0.63	6/7	Walt Lastewka, Liberal
1997 municipal	Scugog, regional council	n.a.	defeated		.	.
2003 municipal	Scugog, mayor	n.a	1,509	19.80	2/2	Marilyn Pearce

The data for the 2003 municipal election is taken from figures listed in the Toronto Star, 11 November 2003. The final results were not significantly different.

=== Toronto Centre—Rosedale: Anthony Robert Pedrette ===
Pedrette was described as "businessman with a background in computer graphics and software development". He argued that nationalizing the Bank of Canada would be necessary for genuine reform in the country (Toronto Star, 30 May 1997). He received 303 votes (0.65%), finishing sixth against Liberal incumbent Bill Graham.

=== Whitby—Ajax: Robert Charles Radford ===
A former management consultant, Radford was retired at the time of the election. His campaign focused on monetary reform and constituent-based grass roots democracy (Toronto Star, 30 May 1997). He received 394 votes (0.80%), finishing fifth against Liberal candidate Judi Longfield.

== Manitoba ==
=== Portage—Lisgar: Roy Lyall ===
Lyall has listed his occupation as a farmer. He campaigned for the Legislative Assembly of Manitoba in the 1990 provincial election as a candidate of the Confederation of Regions Party, and finished fourth against Progressive Conservative Edward Connery with 243 votes.

He first ran for the Canadian House of Commons in the 1993 federal election as a candidate of the Canada Party. He finished seventh out of seven candidates in Lisgar—Marquette with 116 votes, losing to Jake Hoeppner of the Reform Party.

Lyall was the only candidate of the Canadian Action Party to campaign for a Manitoba seat in the 1997 election. He received 159 votes (0.47%), this time finishing sixth against Hoeppner.
