= Green Party of Canada candidates in the 1997 Canadian federal election =

The Green Party of Canada fielded seventy-nine candidates in the 1997 federal election, none of whom were elected. Information about some of these candidates may be found on this page.

== Ontario ==
=== Scarborough Southwest: David James Cooper ===
David James Cooper was a journalist at the time of the election. According to the Toronto Star newspaper, he ran for the Green Party due to a belief that supporting Canada's more established parties would simply encourage "apathy, cynicism, mediocrity and corruption". Cooper's campaign called for "environmentally sound programs, local democracy, sustainable development and long-term planning" (Toronto Star, 30 May 1997).

Electoral record
Election	Division	Party	Votes	%	Place	Winner
1995 provincial	York South	Green	219	0.86	5/9	Bob Rae, New Democratic Party
1997 federal	Scarborough Southwest	Green	482	1.25	5/5	Tom Wappel, Liberal

== Alberta ==
=== Calgary Southwest: Sol Candel ===
Sol Candel holds a Bachelor of Arts degree from the University of Toronto, and a Master's degree from the London School of Economics. He is a longtime resident of Calgary, Alberta, where he owns the Movie Poster Shop, a business that collects and displays vintage movie posters. Candel has been a member of the Green Party for several years; as of 2009, he is the party's financial agent for the electoral division of Calgary Centre-North as of 2009. He is also a director of the Earth System Science/Gaia Theory Society of Alberta, and a partner in Seven Generations Development Inc.

Electoral record
Election	Division	Party	Votes	%	Place	Winner
provincial by-election, July 21, 1992	Calgary-Buffalo	Green	201		5/5	Gary Dickson, Liberal
1993 provincial	Calgary-Glenmore	Green	147		5/6	Dianne Mirosh, Progressive Conservative
1993 federal	Calgary Southwest	Green	301	0.44	6/9	Preston Manning, Reform
1997 federal	Calgary Southwest	Green	310		5/7	Preston Manning, Reform
