= Liberal Party of Canada candidates in the 1997 Canadian federal election =

The Liberal Party of Canada ran a full slate of candidates in the 1997 federal election, and won 155 out of 301 seats to form a majority government. Many of the party's candidates have their own biography pages; information about others may be found here.

== Quebec ==
=== Richelieu: Jocelyn Paul ===
Jocelyn Paul was a retired teacher. She was a supporter of party leader Jean Chrétien in the late 1990s, at a time when some in the party sought to replace him with Paul Martin. She received 13,941 votes (28.91%) in 1997, finishing second against Bloc Québécois incumbent Louis Plamondon.

== Manitoba ==
=== Heather Mack (Portage—Lisgar) ===
Mack was twenty-one years old at the time of the election, and described herself as a restaurant supervisor. She had completed a criminology program at Red River Community College, and was working toward a degree in justice and law enforcement. Mack had also worked for the provincial Department of Justice, and established an inventory program for an aviation company. She supported calls to reform the Canadian Wheat Board, but spoke out against proposals that it be eliminated entirely (Winnipeg Free Press, 30 May 1997).

She received 4,913 votes (14.61%), finishing third against Reform Party incumbent Jake Hoeppner and Progressive Conservative Brian Pallister.

Mack was later an organizer for Allan Rock's abortive bid to lead the Liberal Party of Canada (Winnipeg Free Press, 12 October 2002), and then served as deputy chief of staff to mayor Glen Murray in Winnipeg.. She worked as Murray's campaign manager in the 2004 federal election, and on one occasion spoke out against homophobic slurs that had been targeted against Murray.

=== Rosemary Broadbent (Winnipeg—Transcona) ===
Broadbent has been a probation officer and community justice activist. In 1993, provincial Justice Minister Rosemary Vodrey presented her with an award for her activities in the field of public safety.

When running for office in 1997, Broadbent indicated her support for community-based rehabilitation programs for at-risk youth. She received 7,105 votes (21.46%), finishing second against New Democratic Party incumbent Bill Blaikie. She later organized a justice committee conference in Winnipeg in 1999, bringing together various community justice groups.

In 2006, she was listed as president of the Manitoba Amateur Boxing Association.

== Alberta ==
=== John Phillips (Calgary Northeast) ===
Phillips received 8,646 votes, finishing second against Reform Party incumbent Art Hanger.
