= Opinion polling for the 1997 Canadian federal election =

Polls leading up to the 1997 Canadian federal election.

== National polls ==
Voter intentions in years before the 1997 Canadian federal election Liberal Party of Canada Progressive Conservative Party of Canada Bloc Québécois New Democratic Party of Canada Reform Party

=== Campaign period ===
Evolution of voting intentions at national level
Last day of survey	LPC	Reform	PC	NDP	BQ	Other	Polling firm	Sample	ME	Source
Voting results	38.46	19.35	18.84	11.05	10.67	1.63				
May 28, 1997	41	16	22	11	9	—N/a	Gallup	1,507	± 2.5	PDF
May 28, 1997	39	19	20	11	9	1	Environics	—N/a	± 2.3	HTML
May 27, 1997	36	19	24	11	10	—N/a	Angus Reid	3,200	—N/a	PDF
May 27, 1997	41	18	19	11	10	—N/a	Strategic	—N/a	—N/a	PDF
May 25, 1997	38	18	21	11	10	2	Ekos	3,000	± 1.8	PDF
May 15, 1997	45	16	20	10	8	—N/a	Zogby	1,009	± 3.2	
May 15, 1997	40	18	25	9	7	1	Environics	1,912	—N/a	HTML
May 14, 1997	40	16	23	10	10	1	Strategic	1,200	—N/a	
May 12, 1997	46	14	19	9	11	1	Gallup	1,004	± 3.1	
May 8, 1997	42	18	19	11	9	—N/a	Angus Reid	3,208	± 2.3	HTML
May 4, 1997	48	15	16	10	8	—N/a	Zogby	1,005	± 3.2	
Official call of federal elections (April 27, 1997)

=== During the 35th Parliament of Canada ===
Evolution of voting intentions at national level
Last day of survey	LPC	Reform	PC	NDP	BQ	Other	Polling firm	Sample	ME	Source
April 25, 1997	47	13	18	13	13	—N/a	Compass	2,600	± 1.9	
April 22, 1997	44	15	20	11	8	—N/a	CROP	2,541	± 2.0	PDF
March 31, 1997	41	17	18	12	11	1	Angus Reid	1,500	± 2.5	PDF
March 31, 1997	47	12	16	12	12	1	Environics	—N/a	—N/a	HTML
March 16, 1997	52	—N/a	18	—N/a	10	—N/a	Gallup	1,002	± 3.1	PDF
Gilles Duceppe becomes head of Bloc Québécois (March 15, 1997)
January 27, 1997	45	11	19	10	11	4	Angus Reid	1,519	± 2.5	PDF
December 2, 1996	47	11	18	11	11	1	Angus Reid	1,520	± 2.5	PDF
November 1, 1996	50	11	14	11	13	1	Environics	2,015	± 2.2	
October 28, 1996	52	14	13	9	12	1	Angus Reid	1,502	± 2.5	PDF
October 10, 1996	55	12	15	8	7	3	Angus Reid	3,000	± 1.8	
September 29, 1996	51	11	17	9	10	2	Angus Reid	1,516	± 2.5	HTML
September 9, 1996	50	11	18	9	10	2	Gallup	1,001	± 3.1	
July 28, 1996	57	12	12	9	9	2	Angus Reid	1,516	± 2.5	PDF
June 2, 1996	53	13	16	—N/a	—N/a	—N/a	Angus Reid	1,516	± 2.5	
April 15, 1996	56	13	11	8	11	1	Gallup	—N/a	—N/a	PDF
March 25, 1996	54	16	11	8	—N/a	—N/a	Angus Reid	1,520	± 2.5	
Michel Gauthier becomes head of Bloc Québécois (February 17, 1996)
February 13, 1996	55	13	11	8	13	—N/a	Gallup	1,007	± 3.1	PDF
January 26, 1996	53	16	13	9	7	2	Angus Reid	1,511	± 2.5	
December 13, 1995	49	16	11	10	10	4	Angus Reid	1,506	± 2.5	HTML
December 11, 1995	51	12	15	9	12	—N/a	Gallup	1,002	—N/a	PDF
November 26, 1995	52	15	13	9	9	2	Angus Reid	1,506	± 2.5	HTML
November 1, 1995	56	12	14	8	8	2	Angus Reid	1,503	± 2.5	HTML
Alexa McDonough becomes head of New Democratic Party (October 14, 1995)
September 24, 1995	58	14	12	7	8	1	Angus Reid	1,506	± 2.5	HTML
September 11, 1995	54	13	16	8	9	—N/a	Gallup	1,004	± 3.1	PDF
July 26, 1995	55	12	14	9	7	3	Angus Reid	1,501	—N/a	
July 10, 1995	56	12	15	8	8	1	Gallup	1,005	± 3.1	PDF
June 30, 1995	58	11	13	8	8	2	Angus Reid	1,500	—N/a	
May 30, 1995	57	13	11	8	—N/a	—N/a	Angus Reid	1,500	± 2.5	
March 12, 1995	62	12	8	5	11	—N/a	Gallup	1,004	± 3.0	PDF
February 12, 1995	55	14	8	8	—N/a	—N/a	Gallup	1,005	—N/a	1 2
January 23, 1995	54	14	9	6	10	7	Angus Reid	1,500	± 2.5	
January 15, 1995	58	12	11	5	14	0	Gallup	1,003	± 3.1	
November 7, 1994	63	11	8	5	12	1	Gallup	1,011	± 3.1	PDF
October 1, 1994	62	13	6	4	8	6	Angus Reid	—N/a	—N/a	PDF
September 7, 1994	60	10	12	5	12	1	Gallup	1,012	± 3.1	PDF
June 13, 1994	59	14	10	6	12	—N/a	Gallup	1,009	± 3.1	PDF
June 1, 1994	55	16	8	7	9	5	Angus Reid	1,508	± 2.5	PDF
May 9, 1994	58	14	10	5	12	1	Gallup	1,009	± 3.1	PDF
April 27, 1994	56	18	6	5	—N/a	—N/a	Angus Reid	1,506	± 2.5	
April 11, 1994	55	17	9	6	13	—N/a	Gallup	1,014	± 3.1	PDF
March 22, 1994	58	18	7	4	10	—N/a	Angus Reid	1,508	± 2.5	HTML
March 13, 1994	56	17	8	6	11	—N/a	Gallup	1,001	± 3.1	PDF
February 24, 1994	58	20	5	4	9	5	Angus Reid	1,465	—N/a	1
February 14, 1994	58	17	7	4	12	—N/a	Gallup	1,005	± 3.1	PDF
January 17, 1994	57	18	7	5	12	—N/a	Gallup	1,001	± 3.1	
Jean Charest becomes head of Progressive Conservative Party (December 14, 1993)
December 14, 1993	56	17	8	7	11	—N/a	Gallup	1,000	± 3.1	PDF
October 25, 1993	41.24	18.69	16.04	6.88	13.52					

== By geographic area ==
=== In the Atlantic provinces ===
Evolution of voting intentions in the Atlantic provinces
Last day of survey	LPC	Reform	PC	NDP	Other	Polling firm	Sample	ME	Source
Voting result	32.8	9.0	33.8	23.7	0.7				
May 27, 1997	28	—N/a	28	29	—N/a	Strategic Counsel	—N/a	—N/a	
May 15, 1997	44	6	34	16	0	Environics	—N/a	—N/a	
May 8, 1997	40	10	31	18	—N/a	Angus Reid	203	± 7.0	HTML
Official call of federal elections (April 27, 1997)
April 22, 1997	45	7	32	15	—N/a	CROP	316	± 6.0	PDF
April 22, 1997	42	9	25	23	0	Angus Reid	97	—N/a	PDF
March 31, 1997	40	7	31	22	0	Angus Reid	95	—N/a	PDF
March 31, 1997	50	5	23	22	0	Environics	—N/a	—N/a	
January 27, 1997	49	3	32	13	3	Angus Reid	112	—N/a	PDF
December 2, 1996	51	1	32	16	0	Angus Reid	113	—N/a	PDF
July 28, 1996	63	8	18	11	0	Angus Reid	87	—N/a	PDF
October 1, 1994	68	8	16	5	3	Angus Reid	—N/a	—N/a	PDF
February 24, 1994	65	11	5	12	6	Angus Reid	115	—N/a	PDF

=== In Québec ===
Evolution of voting intentions in Québec
Last day of survey	LPC	Reform	PC	NDP	BQ	Other	Polling firm	Sample	ME	Source
Voting results	36.7	0.3	22.2	2.0	37.9	0.9				
May 28, 1997	37	—N/a	29	—N/a	33	—N/a	Gallup	—N/a	—N/a	PDF
May 28, 1997	35	3	26	3	36	3	Léger	—N/a	—N/a	1 2
May 27, 1997	33	1	28	2	35	1	SOM	1,002	± 3.7	PDF
May 27, 1997	37	—N/a	23	—N/a	37	—N/a	Strategic Counsel	608	—N/a	
May 26, 1997	32	1	28	2	36	0	CROP	1,007	± 3.0	PDF
May 25, 1997	30	—N/a	26	—N/a	40	—N/a	Ekos	—N/a	—N/a	PDF
May 23, 1997	34	—N/a	31	—N/a	33	2	Léger	—N/a	—N/a	PDF
May 21, 1997	34	—N/a	30	—N/a	31	5	SOM	—N/a	—N/a	PDF
May 16, 1997	33	—N/a	30	—N/a	35	2	Léger	1,004	± 3.1	1 2
May 15, 1997	32	1	36	4	27	0	Environics	507	—N/a	PDF
May 12, 1997	36	—N/a	19	—N/a	37	8	SOM	—N/a	—N/a	PDF
May 10, 1997	37	—N/a	20	—N/a	38	5	CROP	—N/a	—N/a	PDF
May 9, 1997	39	—N/a	20	—N/a	37	4	Léger	—N/a	—N/a	PDF
May 8, 1997	38	—N/a	20	4	36	6	Angus Reid	796	± 3.5	HTML
May 7, 1997	39	—N/a	13	—N/a	39	9	SOM	—N/a	—N/a	PDF
Official call of federal elections (April 27, 1997)
April 23, 1997	35	—N/a	17	—N/a	40	3	SOM	—N/a	—N/a	PDF
April 22, 1997	37	1	25	3	35	—N/a	CROP	—N/a	—N/a	PDF
April 22, 1997	36	1	9	4	49	0	Angus Reid	340	—N/a	PDF
April 22, 1997	37	1	15	3	43	1	Léger	1,006	± 3.1	PDF
April 13, 1997	37	—N/a	15	—N/a	44	5	Sondagem	1,065	± 3.1	PDF
March 31, 1997	36	2	14	3	44	1	Angus Reid	334	—N/a	PDF
March 31, 1997	42	0	10	2	44	2	Environics	—N/a	—N/a	PDF
March 23, 1997	31	—N/a	17	—N/a	48	3	CROP	—N/a	—N/a	PDF
March 16, 1997	47	—N/a	10	—N/a	41	—N/a	Gallup	—N/a	± 6.0	PDF
February 26, 1997	41	1	10	2	45	1	Léger	1,000	± 3.1	PDF
January 29, 1997	36	0	10	5	45	4	Léger	1,002	± 3.1	PDF
January 27, 1997	37	1	11	5	41	5	Angus Reid	359	—N/a	PDF
December 17, 1996	33	—N/a	14	—N/a	45	8	CROP	1,002	± 3.0	PDF
December 12, 1996	37	0	13	3	44	3	Léger	1,005	± 3.1	PDF
December 2, 1996	33	1	12	5	45	2	Angus Reid	347	—N/a	PDF
November 1, 1996	39	—N/a	8	—N/a	48	—N/a	Environics	—N/a	—N/a	
October 28, 1996	40	2	9	2	46	1	Angus Reid	333	—N/a	PDF
October 23, 1996	39	—N/a	14	—N/a	42	5	SOM	1,000	± 3.7	PDF
September 29, 1996	38	1	16	2	40	3	Angus Reid	347	—N/a	PDF
August 22, 1996	35	0	10	4	47	4	Léger	1,001	± 3.1	PDF
July 28, 1996	36	2	9	1	47	5	Angus Reid	247	—N/a	PDF
May 27, 1996	35	2	10	2	51	—N/a	CROP	1,009	± 3.0	PDF
May 21, 1996	30	2	15	3	46	4	SOM	2,007	—N/a	PDF
March 17, 1996	35	—N/a	8	—N/a	53	4	CROP	—N/a	—N/a	PDF
February 20, 1996	33	—N/a	7	—N/a	54	6	CROP	—N/a	—N/a	PDF
February 13, 1996	41	—N/a	2	2	54	—N/a	Gallup	—N/a	—N/a	PDF
January 25, 1996	29	1	9	3	46	12	Léger	1,005	± 3.1	
January 23, 1996	34	—N/a	5	—N/a	55	6	CROP	—N/a	—N/a	PDF
December 11, 1995	43	—N/a	6	—N/a	48	—N/a	Gallup	—N/a	—N/a	PDF
November 26, 1995	43	—N/a	—N/a	—N/a	41	—N/a	Angus Reid	400	—N/a	HTML
November 1, 1995	42	3	13	2	36	4	Angus Reid	400	—N/a	
September 24, 1995	52	—N/a	—N/a	—N/a	33	—N/a	Angus Reid	400	—N/a	HTML
September 11, 1995	54	—N/a	—N/a	—N/a	37	—N/a	Gallup	—N/a	± 6.0	PDF
August 23, 1995	38	2	7	4	47	3	Léger	1,003	± 3.1	PDF
July 26, 1995	53	—N/a	—N/a	—N/a	30	—N/a	Angus Reid	—N/a	—N/a	
July 10, 1995	58	—N/a	—N/a	—N/a	33	—N/a	Gallup	269	± 6.0	PDF
June 20, 1995	37	1	11	0	46	6	Léger	1,005	± 3.1	PDF
March 22, 1995	36	2	5	1	54	2	Léger	1,005	± 3.1	PDF
March 12, 1995	51	—N/a	—N/a	—N/a	42	—N/a	Gallup	267	± 6.0	PDF
February 12, 1995	42	—N/a	4	3	51	—N/a	Gallup	268	—N/a	PDF
February 8, 1995	42	—N/a	3	—N/a	48	7	CROP	—N/a	—N/a	PDF
January 23, 1995	44	—N/a	—N/a	—N/a	39	—N/a	Angus Reid	—N/a	—N/a	
October 1, 1994	47	0	3	2	33	11	Angus Reid	299	—N/a	PDF
June 13, 1994	50	—N/a	2	—N/a	47	—N/a	Gallup	272	± 6.0	PDF
June 1, 1994	50	—N/a	—N/a	—N/a	37	—N/a	Angus Reid	401	—N/a	PDF
May 9, 1994	37	—N/a	9	—N/a	52	—N/a	Gallup	272	± 6.0	PDF
April 27, 1994	44	—N/a	—N/a	—N/a	39	—N/a	Angus Reid	—N/a	—N/a	
April 11, 1994	41	—N/a	—N/a	—N/a	52	—N/a	Gallup	272	—N/a	PDF
March 22, 1994	41	—N/a	6	3	49	2	CROP	—N/a	—N/a	PDF
March 22, 1994	48	—N/a	—N/a	—N/a	42	—N/a	Angus Reid	401	—N/a	HTML
March 13, 1994	48	—N/a	3	—N/a	47	—N/a	Gallup	—N/a	—N/a	PDF
February 24, 1994	51	0	3	1	38	6	Angus Reid	309	—N/a	PDF
February 21, 1994	47	—N/a	5	2	43	3	CROP	—N/a	—N/a	PDF
February 14, 1994	43	—N/a	—N/a	—N/a	49	—N/a	Gallup	268	± 6.0	PDF
January 17, 1994	47	—N/a	—N/a	—N/a	46	—N/a	Gallup	268	± 6.0	
December 14, 1993	40	—N/a	—N/a	—N/a	49	—N/a	Gallup	268	± 6.0	PDF
Election 1993	33.0	–	13.5	1.5	49.3	2.7				

=== In Ontario ===
Evolution of voting intentions in Ontario
Last day of survey	LPC	Reform	PC	NDP	Other	Polling firm	Sample	ME	Source
Voting results	49.5	19.1	18.8	10.7	1.9				
May 15, 1997	49	17	22	10	1	Environics	—N/a	—N/a	
May 8, 1997	52	16	19	12	—N/a	Angus Reid	605	± 4.0	HTML
Official call of federal elections (April 27, 1997)
April 22, 1997	54	16	18	12	—N/a	CROP	414	± 5.0	PDF
April 22, 1997	46	17	25	11	1	Angus Reid	482	—N/a	PDF
March 31, 1997	53	14	19	12	1	Angus Reid	467	—N/a	PDF
March 31, 1997	56	11	18	15	1	Environics	—N/a	—N/a	
January 27, 1997	52	10	25	9	3	Angus Reid	510	—N/a	PDF
December 2, 1996	57	10	22	11	0	Angus Reid	505	—N/a	PDF
November 1, 1996	65	6	17	11	1	Environics	—N/a	—N/a	
September 29, 1996	57	9	21	11	1	Angus Reid	497	—N/a	PDF
July 28, 1996	67	10	15	7	1	Angus Reid	407	—N/a	PDF
October 1, 1994	75	12	5	5	2	Angus Reid	—N/a	—N/a	PDF
February 24, 1994	64	23	6	4	4	Angus Reid	488	—N/a	PDF
Election 1993	52.9	20.1	17.6	6.0	3.4				

=== In the Prairies ===
Evolution of voting intentions in Prairies (Manitoba and Saskatchewan)
Last day of survey	LPC	Reform	PC	NDP	Other	Polling firm	Sample	ME	Source
Voting result	29.7	29.6	13.0	26.9	0.9				
May 15, 1997	38	26	22	14	1	Environics	—N/a	—N/a	
May 8, 1997	34	25	16	25	—N/a	Angus Reid	201	± 7.0	HTML
Official call of federal elections (April 27, 1997)
March 31, 1997	37	28	17	18	0	Angus Reid	97	—N/a	PDF
March 31, 1997	45	14	18	22	1	Environics	—N/a	—N/a	
April 22, 1997	39	22	15	22	—N/a	CROP	320	± 6.0	PDF
April 22, 1997	52	19	9	20	—N/a	Angus Reid	95	—N/a	PDF
January 27, 1997	42	9	19	24	6	Angus Reid	102	—N/a	PDF
December 2, 1996	40	13	17	29	2	Angus Reid	104	—N/a	PDF
July 28, 1996	53	18	8	21	0	Angus Reid	69	—N/a	PDF
October 1, 1994	63	20	8	3	5	Angus Reid	—N/a	—N/a	PDF
February 24, 1994	66	17	3	7	7	Angus Reid	97	—N/a	PDF

=== In Alberta ===
Evolution of voting intentions in Alberta
Last day of survey	LPC	Reform	PC	NDP	Other	Polling firm	Sample	ME	Source
Voting results	24.0	54.6	14.4	5.7	1.3				
May 15, 1997	30	40	21	8	1	Environics	—N/a	—N/a	
May 8, 1997	31	41	21	6	—N/a	Angus Reid	703	± 3.5	HTML
Official call of federal elections (April 27, 1997)
April 22, 1997	29	31	27	9	—N/a	CROP	285	± 6.0	PDF
April 22, 1997	36	29	27	8	0	Angus Reid	129	—N/a	PDF
March 31, 1997	26	38	26	10	0	Angus Reid	132	—N/a	PDF
March 31, 1997	30	32	28	9	1	Environics	—N/a	—N/a	
January 27, 1997	39	33	17	6	5	Angus Reid	126	—N/a	PDF
December 2, 1996	34	35	25	6	0	Angus Reid	126	—N/a	PDF
September 29, 1996	43	36	17	4	1	Angus Reid	120	—N/a	PDF
July 28, 1996	39	37	17	8	0	Angus Reid	103	—N/a	PDF
March 25, 1996	35	47	13	3	2	Angus Reid	94	—N/a	PDF
January 26, 1996	29	50	13	7	1	Angus Reid	88	—N/a	PDF
November 26, 1995	32	48	—N/a	—N/a	—N/a	Angus Reid	135	—N/a	HTML
September 24, 1995	51	36	—N/a	—N/a	—N/a	Angus Reid	137	—N/a	HTML
January 23, 1995	35	44	—N/a	—N/a	—N/a	Angus Reid	—N/a	—N/a	
October 1, 1994	49	32	11	2	6	Angus Reid	—N/a	—N/a	PDF
June 1, 1994	52	41	—N/a	—N/a	—N/a	Angus Reid	—N/a	—N/a	PDF
February 24, 1994	40	49	6	1	4	Angus Reid	112	—N/a	PDF
Election 1993	25.1	52.3	14.6	4.1	3.9				

=== In British Columbia ===
Evolution of voting intentions in British Columbia
Last day of survey	LPC	Reform	PC	NDP	Other	Polling firm	Sample	ME	Source
Voting results	28.8	43.1	6.2	18.2	3.7				
May 15, 1997	39	40	9	12	0	Environics	—N/a	—N/a	
May 8, 1997	34	41	6	17	—N/a	Angus Reid	—N/a	—N/a	HTML
Official call of federal elections (April 27, 1997)
April 22, 1997	40	30	9	18	—N/a	CROP	—N/a	—N/a	PDF
April 22, 1997	41	33	10	13	2	Angus Reid	159	—N/a	PDF
March 31, 1997	34	36	10	17	4	Angus Reid	169	—N/a	PDF
March 31, 1997	45	27	8	19	1	Environics	—N/a	—N/a	
January 27, 1997	39	26	12	17	6	Angus Reid	169	—N/a	PDF
September 29, 1996	56	23	5	14	2	Angus Reid	165	—N/a	PDF
July 28, 1996	55	19	4	19	3	Angus Reid	139	—N/a	PDF
March 25, 1996	51	30	4	13	1	Angus Reid	140	—N/a	PDF
January 26, 1996	55	27	4	12	2	Angus Reid	135	—N/a	PDF
October 1, 1994	54	24	2	10	9	Angus Reid	—N/a	—N/a	PDF
June 1, 1994	48	35	—N/a	—N/a	—N/a	Angus Reid	—N/a	—N/a	PDF
February 24, 1994	53	34	0	7	6	Angus Reid	160	—N/a	PDF
Election 1993	28.1	36.4	13.5	15.5	6.5				
