= Canadian Action Party =

Canadian Action Party Parti Action Canadienne
- Abbreviation: CAP; PAC
- Leader: Jeremy Arney
- President: Jeff Sakula
- Founder: Paul T. Hellyer
- Founded: 1997
- Dissolved: 31 March 2017
- Headquarters: 788 Mabel Lake Road, Lumby, British Columbia, Canada
- Ideology: Canadian nationalism Civic nationalism Left-wing nationalism Anti-Americanism; Anti-globalization; Monetary reform
- Political position: Left-wing
- Colours: Red
- House of Commons: 0 / 338
- Senate: 0 / 105

Website
- ActionParty.ca

The Canadian Action Party (CAP; French: Parti action canadienne, PAC) was a Canadian federal political party founded in 1997 and deregistered on 31 March 2017.

The party stood for Canadian nationalism, monetary and electoral reform, and opposed liberal globalization and free trade agreements that had been signed by the Canadian government.

== History ==
The Canadian Action Party (CAP) was founded by Paul Hellyer, a former Liberal minister of national defence in the cabinet of Lester B. Pearson. Hellyer ran unsuccessfully for the leadership of the Liberal Party in 1968, and for the leadership of the Progressive Conservative Party in 1976.

CAP nominated candidates for the first time in the 1997 federal election.

After the 1997 election, it absorbed the Canada Party, another minor party concerned about monetary reform which had been formed by former members of the Social Credit Party of Canada. Former Canada Party leader Claire Foss served as vice president of CAP until November 2003.

Hellyer resigned as CAP leader in 2003 after the New Democratic Party (NDP) never agreed to a merger proposal, under which the NDP would change its name. In 2004, Connie Fogal, an activist lawyer, was acclaimed party leader after David Orchard failed to respond to an invitation to take over the leadership. Fogal stepped down in 2008; she was succeeded by Andrew J. Moulden following the 2008 federal election.

The acting chief electoral officer of Canada advised the party leader that the party would be deregistered effective Friday, March 31, 2017, for not having at least 250 members who are eligible voters.

== Positions ==
=== Monetary reform movement ===
Monetary reform was a key policy issue for CAP, to ensure the sovereignty of the country's money supply. CAP sought fundamental reform of the banking system. CAP advocated for borrowing from the Bank of Canada to finance infrastructure.

A number of CAP members also belonged to the Committee on Monetary and Economic Reform and had been influential in developing CAP's monetary policy, particularly its position that the Bank of Canada, rather than chartered banks, should provide loans to the government, if required, to fund public spending. Hellyer advocated for the Bank of Canada to more extensively create money and finance public debt. CAP proposed increasing the ratio of new money created by the government to 50%.

CAP also argued for the abrogation of the North American Free Trade Agreement, and opposed current government trade initiatives and any legislation leading to the Free Trade Area of the Americas, Trans-Pacific Partnership and what it saw as integration with the United States and Mexico into a North American Union.

== Federal leaders ==
Shown by default in chronological order of leadership

Year	Name	Period	Time in office
1997	Paul Hellyer	1997 – 2004	7 years
2004	Connie Fogal	2004 – November 2008	4 years
2008	Andrew J. Moulden	November 2008 – August 2009	9 months
2009	Dave Wilkinson	August 2009 – October 2009	2 months
2009	Melissa Brade	October 2009 – September 2010	11 months
2010	Christopher Porter	September 2010 – July 2012	1 year and 10 months
2012	Jason Chase	July 2012 – April 2014	1 year and 9 months
2014	Jeremy Arney	April 2014 – March 2017	2 years and 11 months

== Presidents ==
Shown by default in chronological order of leadership

Year	Name	Period	Time in office	Deputy leader/s
2003	Claire Foss	??? – 2003	???	
2003	Connie Fogal	2003 – 2004	1 year	
2005	Catherine Whelan Costen	November 2005 – January 2007	1 year	
2007	Bev Collins	February 2007 – 2008	1 year	
2008	Marc Bombois	2008 – August 2008	??	
2008	Paul Kemp	August 2008 – 2009	1 year	
2009	Calvin Keats	2009 – February 2010	1 year	
2010	Noelene Smith	July 2010 – 2011	1 year	
2012	Maggie Braun	2012 – November 2013	1 year	
2013	Jeremy Arney	December 2013 – April 2014	4 months	
2014	Logan Anderson	May 2014 – May 2015	1 year	
2015	Jeff Sakula	May 2015 – March 2017	1 year and 10 months	

== Electoral results ==
Election	Leader	Votes	%	% where ran	Seats	+/–	Position	Government
1997	Paul T. Hellyer	17,502	0.13%	0.671%	0 / 301	▲	▲9/10	No seats
2000	Paul T. Hellyer	27,103	0.21%	0.855%	0 / 301	▲	▲8/11	No seats
2004	Connie Fogal	8,807	0.06%	0.405%	0 / 308	▼	▼9/12	No seats
2006	Connie Fogal	6,102	0.04%	0.345%	0 / 308	▼	▼10/15	No seats
2008	Connie Fogal	3,455	0.02%	0.380%	0 / 308	▼	▼11/19	No seats
2011	Christopher Porter	2,030	0.01%	0.333%	0 / 308	▼	▼13/18	No seats
2015	Jeremy Arney	401	0.00%	0.244%	0 / 338	▼	▼17/23	No seats

Date	By-Election	Candidate	# of votes	% of popular vote	Place	Winner
Mar 30, 1998	Port Moody-Coquitlam	Will Arlow	156	0.54%	6/8	Lou Sekora (Liberal)
Nov 15, 1999	York West	Stephen Burega	242	1.78%	5/6	Judy Sgro (Liberal)
Sep 11, 2000	Okanagan-Coquihalla	Jack William Peach	1,159	4.19%	4/8	Stockwell Day (Alliance)
Nov 27, 2006	London North Centre	Will Arlow	29	0.13%	7/7	Glen Pearson (Liberal)
Nov 27, 2006	Repentigny	Mahmood Raza Baig	91	0.29%	6/7	Raymond Gravel (Bloc)
Sep 17, 2007	Saint-Hyacinthe-Bagot	Michel St-Onge	61	0.19%	7/7	Ève-Mary Thaï Thi Lac (Bloc)
Sep 17, 2007	Outremont	Alexandre Amirizian	45	0.19%	10/12	Thomas Mulcair (New Democrat)
Mar 17, 2008	Toronto Centre	Doug Plumb	97	0.40%	6/6	Bob Rae (Liberal)
Mar 17, 2008	Vancouver Quadra	Psamuel Frank	40	0.14%	6/6	Joyce Murray (Liberal)

== See also ==
Party logo in use until 2006

- A Program for Monetary Reform
- Alter-globalization
- American Monetary Institute
- Canadian Action Party candidates, 2006 Canadian federal election
- Canadian Action Party candidates, 2004 Canadian federal election
- Canadian Action Party candidates, 2000 Canadian federal election
- Canadian Action Party candidates, 1997 Canadian federal election
- Canadian social credit movement
- Chicago plan
- Committee on Monetary and Economic Reform
- List of political parties in Canada
- National Advancement Party of Canada
- Social credit
- The Chicago Plan Revisited
