= Independent Rhinoceros candidates in the 1997 Canadian federal election =

The Rhinoceros Party of Canada ceased to exist after the 1988 federal election, although several independent candidates afterward adopted the "Rhinoceros" label. A number of independent Rhinoceros candidates campaigned in the 1997 election. Information about them may be found here.

== Manitoba ==
=== M. Rhino Olito (Winnipeg South) ===
Olito is more accurately known as Michael Olito, a visual artist and performance after from Winnipeg. He has described himself as the leader of the Independent Rogue Rhinoceros Party of Manitoba (Winnipeg Free Press, 12 May 1996).

Olito is six-foot, seven-inches tall, and has been described as "mammoth" in his personal appearance. His early displays, including a Winnipeg Art Gallery presentation in 1996, combined environmental and performance art (Winnipeg Free Press, 24 February 1996).

He first campaigned for parliament as a "Rogue Rhino" in the 1993 election, and received 113 votes (0.22%) for a seventh-place finish against Liberal candidate Reg Alcock. He campaigned on a pledge of developing an alternative wooden helicopter for the Canadian military, and later released a film of his campaign under the name "Rhinos Rhule" (Winnipeg Free Press, 18 November 1995). In 1997, he received 191 votes (0.50%) for a fifth-place finish against Alcock.

He staged a performance cabaret Grant Guy and Deborah Patterson at Perf' 94, a Winnipeg performance arts festival (Winnipeg Free Press, 4 June 1994). He released his first novel, the acclaimed "Atli's Tale", in 1996 (Winnipeg Free Press, 21 April 1996). He has also co-written "The Icelanders" with David Arnason.
