= Independent candidates in the 1997 Canadian federal election =

There were several independent and non-affiliated candidates in the 1997 Canadian federal election. One such candidate, former Liberal John Nunziata, was elected in York South—Weston. Information about other candidates may be found here.

== Manitoba ==
=== Geoff Gorf Borden (Brandon—Souris) ===
Geoff Borden, nicknamed "Gorf" first campaigned for public office in the 1995 Brandon mayoral election. He was a twenty-year-old part-time student, and said that he was running because he was tired of older people making decisions for him. He opposed Sunday shopping. Borden ran as an independent candidate in the 1997 federal election, campaigned for mayor again later in the year, and sought election to the Brandon City Council in 2002.

Electoral record
| Election | Division | Party | Votes | % | Place | Winner |
|---|---|---|---|---|---|---|
| 1995 municipal | Mayor of Brandon | n/a | 1,175 | 8.34 | 3/3 | Rick Borotsik |
| 1997 federal | Brandon—Souris | Non-affiliated | 244 | 0.66 | 5/6 | Rick Borotsik, Progressive Conservative |
| by-election, 24 September 1997 | Mayor of Brandon | n/a | not listed | not listed | not listed | Reg Atkinson |
| 2002 municipal | Brandon City Council, Ward Two | n/a | 205 | | 2/4 | Vince Barletta |

=== Greg Krawchuk (Winnipeg Centre) ===
Krawchuk was listed as a grocer. Greg Krawchuk ran on referendum and recall like in Switzerland. He was also against corrupt banking policies of the Bank of Canada. If the right procedures were put in place there would be no national debt in Canada. He received 148 votes (0.55%), finishing fifth against New Democratic Party candidate Pat Martin.

== Saskatchewan ==
=== Sam Dyck (Wanuskewin) ===
Dyck listed himself as a farmer and businessman. He unsuccessfully sought the Reform Party nomination against Maurice Vellacott, and later entered the contest as an independent. Although a conservative on both fiscal and social issues, Dyck argued that he would not impose his personal views on others. He was quoted as saying, "You can't legislate morality and that's the direction he (Vellacott) is going" (Saskatoon Star-Phoenix, 17 May 1997). He received 420 votes (1.28%), finishing fifth against Vellacott.
