= 1997 Canadian federal election =

- June 2, 1997

301 seats in the House of Commons 151 seats needed for a majority
- Opinion polls
- Turnout: 67.0% (▼3.9 pp)
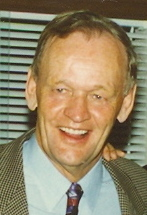

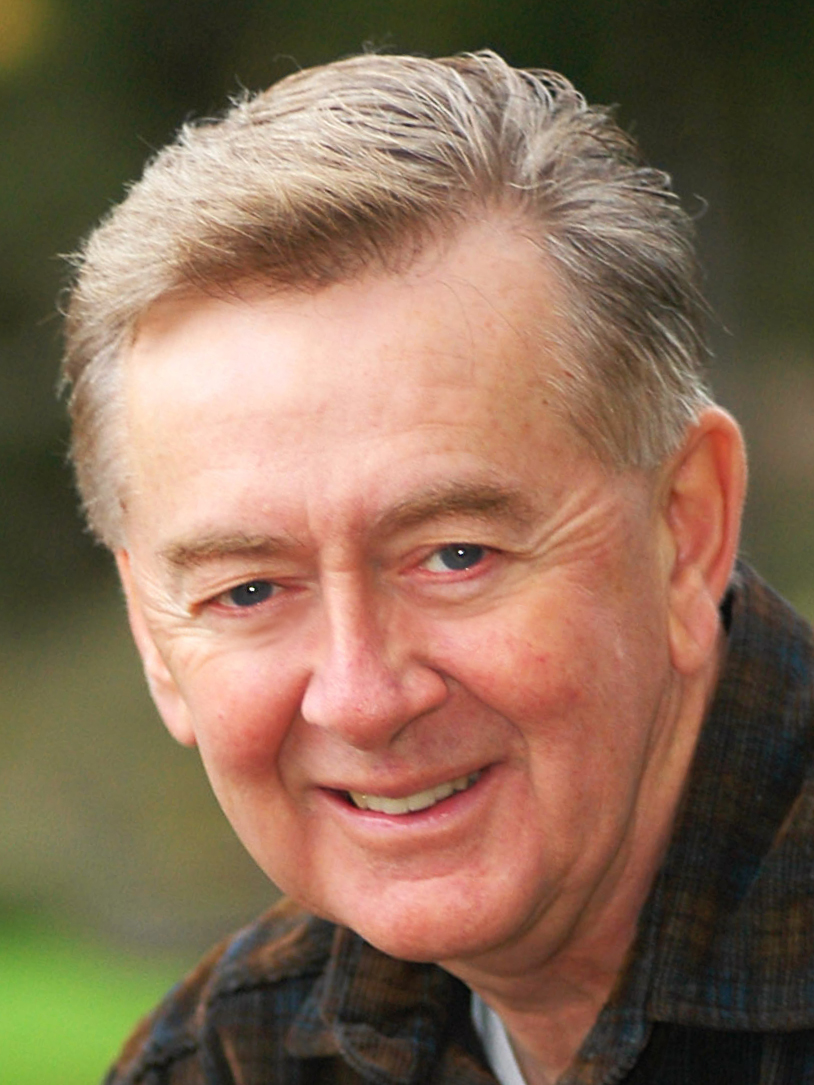

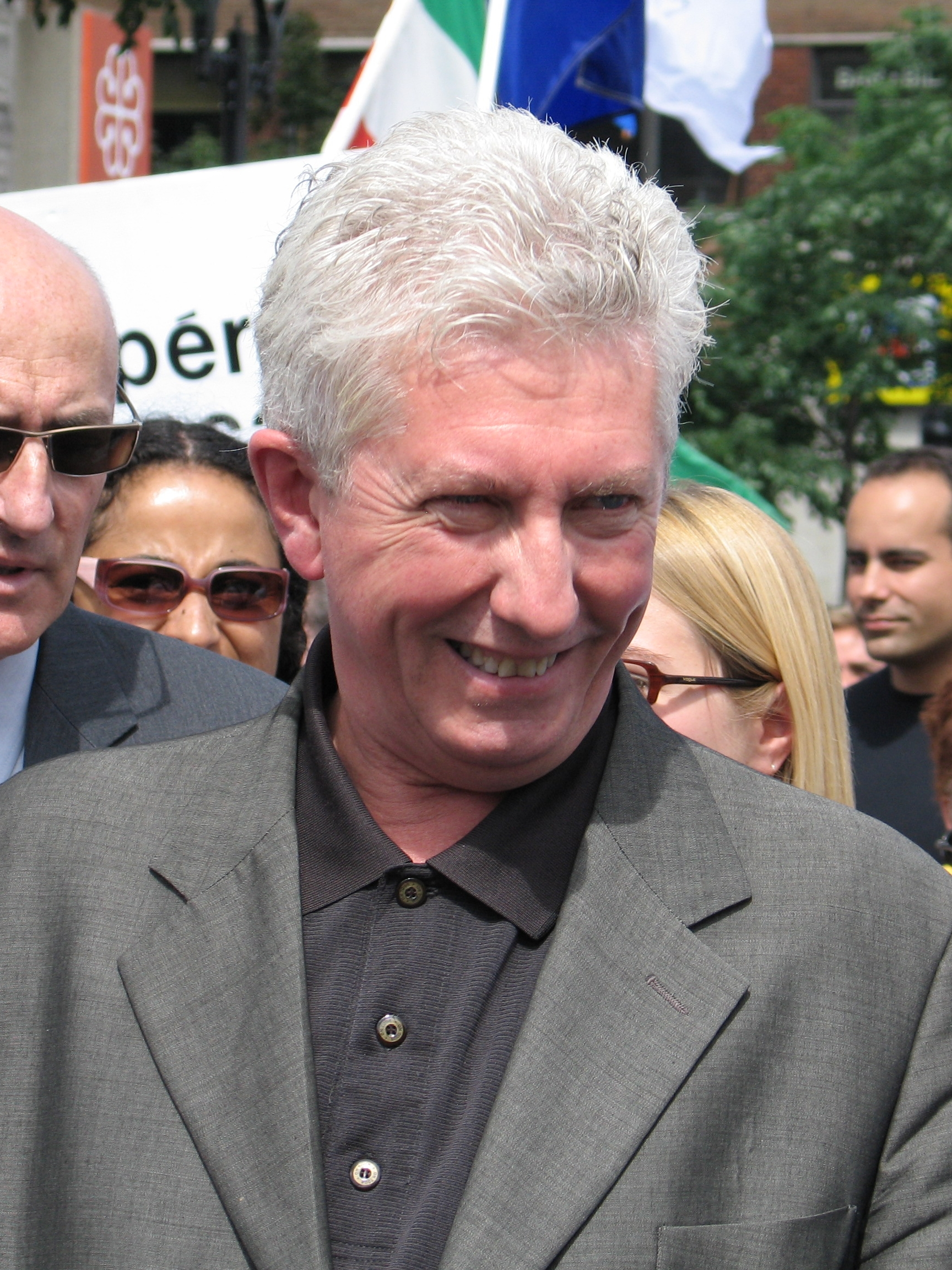

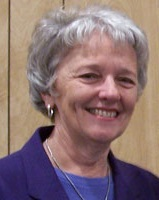

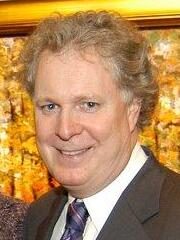
	First party	Second party	Third party
Leader	Jean Chrétien	Preston Manning	Gilles Duceppe
Party	Liberal	Reform	Bloc Québécois
Leader since	June 23, 1990	November 1, 1987	March 15, 1997
Leader's seat	Saint-Maurice	Calgary Southwest	Laurier— Sainte-Marie
Last election	177 seats, 41.24%	52 seats, 18.69%	54 seats, 13.52%
Seats before	174	50	50
Seats won	155	60	44
Seat change	▼19	▲10	▼6
Popular vote	4,994,277	2,513,080	1,385,821
Percentage	38.46%	19.35%	10.67% (Note: Only contested seats in Quebec.)
Swing	▼2.78 pp	▲0.66 pp	▼2.85 pp
	Fourth party	Fifth party
Leader	Alexa McDonough	Jean Charest
Party	New Democratic	Progressive Conservative
Leader since	October 14, 1995	April 29, 1995
Leader's seat	Halifax	Sherbrooke
Last election	9 seats, 6.88%	2 seats, 16.04%
Seats before	9	2
Seats won	21	20
Seat change	▲12	▲18
Popular vote	1,434,509	2,446,705
Percentage	11.05%	18.84%
Swing	▲4.17 pp	▲2.80 pp

- The Canadian parliament after the 1997 election
Prime Minister before election
Jean Chrétien
Liberal
Prime Minister after election
Jean Chrétien
Liberal

The 1997 Canadian federal election was held on June 2, 1997, to elect members to the House of Commons of the 36th Parliament of Canada. Prime Minister Jean Chrétien's Liberal Party won a second majority government. The Reform Party replaced the Bloc Québécois as the Official Opposition.

The election results closely followed the pattern of the 1993 election. The Liberals swept Ontario, while the Bloc won a majority in Quebec. Reform made sufficient gains in the West to allow Preston Manning to become leader of the Official Opposition, but lost its only seat east of Manitoba. The most significant change was major gains in Atlantic Canada by the New Democratic Party (NDP) and the rump Progressive Conservative Party. The Liberal victory was not in doubt, though some commentators on election night were predicting that the party would be cut down to a minority government and that Chrétien might lose his seat. Chrétien narrowly won his riding, and the Liberals maintained a narrow five-seat majority thanks to gains in Quebec at the expense of the Bloc. Jean Charest's Tories (Progressive Conservatives) and Alexa McDonough's NDP both regained official party status in the House of Commons.

This was the first time that five political parties held official party status in a single session of Canada's Parliament, and the only time to date that five different parties have won the popular vote in at least one of the provinces and territories of Canada. This was the first election since 1953 that resulted in back-to-back Liberal majority governments. The Liberals won 101 seats in the province of Ontario, a record that has been unbroken since.

== Background ==
Prime Minister Jean Chrétien announced his approved request by Governor General Roméo LeBlanc to dissolve Parliament on April 26, 1997, with an election to be held on June 2 of that year. Chrétien's election call came three years and five months into Parliament's life, short of both the maximum five-year duration and the typical four years between elections. This represented the earliest election call in a majority Parliament since the 1911 election. Opinion polls at the time predicted that the Liberal Party was expected to win a landslide victory capturing at least 180 to 220 of the 301 seats in the House of Commons, with the fragmentation of the opposition meaning that one party was not expected to be able to defeat the government.

The election call was controversial both for being early and for occurring during Manitoba's recovery from the Red River Flood earlier in the year. Reg Alcock and several others inside the Liberal Party had opposed the timing of the vote, and the poor results prompted Paul Martin's supporters to organize against Chrétien.

The election was the first to be held with staggered polling hours across the country. Until 1993, polling hours were 9 a.m. to 8 p.m. in each time zone, with a 4.5-hour difference between closing of polls in Newfoundland and those in British Columbia and Yukon, or a three-hour difference between Quebec-Ontario and B.C.-Yukon. With the new staggered hours, it would be three hours between Newfoundland and B.C.-Yukon, but just 30 minutes between Quebec-Ontario and B.C.-Yukon.

== Political parties ==
=== Liberal Party ===
Liberal Party logo during the election.

The Liberal Party under Jean Chrétien campaigned on promising to continue to cut the federal deficit to allow for a budget surplus, and then to spend one half of the surplus on repaying Canada's national debt and cutting taxes while the other half of the surplus would be used to increase funding to health care, assistance for Canadian children in poverty, and job creation. The platform was called Securing Our Future Together. The Liberal Party was attacked by the opposition parties for failing to keep many of the promises that the party campaigned on in the 1993 federal election. The Liberals attacked the Progressive Conservatives and the Reform Party for prematurely calling for tax cuts while a deficit still remained while attacking the New Democratic Party for proposing to increase government spending while Canada faced a deficit.

The Liberals suffered from a number of gaffes in their campaign. In one incident, when Jean Chrétien was questioned by reporters over the cost of the Liberals' election proposal of a national pharmacare program, reporters claimed that Chrétien was unsure of what the cost would be. Chrétien also turned down invitations for interviews by Canada's national media outlets, the Canadian Broadcasting Corporation (CBC) and MuchMusic. In the televised debates between the five major political parties, Chrétien apologized to Canadians for his government having cut funding for social programs to reduce the deficit.

On election day, the Liberals won with a significantly reduced majority. While they lost much of their support in Atlantic Canada, they won all but two seats in Ontario and improved on their numbers in Quebec. They were only assured of a majority when the final numbers came in from Western Canada.

=== Reform Party ===
Logo of the Reform Party during the election.

The Reform Party under Preston Manning campaigned on preserving national unity through decentralization of multiple federal government powers to all of the provinces, cutting taxes, reducing the size of government, reducing spending, and strongly opposing distinct society status for Quebec - instead promoting greater autonomy for all provinces including Quebec. Feeling that the general acceptance of deficit reduction at the federal and provincial level had been encouraged by their party, Reform saw a chance to finally make the party national in scope by making political inroads outside of the west, particularly in Ontario. Their platform was titled the Fresh Start for all Canadians. The Reformers ran a full slate of candidates in Quebec, making this the first and last election in which it would run candidates in every region of Canada.

Reform's campaign ran into multiple problems. The party was repeatedly accused by other parties and the media of holding intolerant views due to comments made by a number of Reform MPs during the writ period. Critics had accused the party's performance during the 1993–1997 parliament of being disorganized. Tension between the party's democratic nature and the leader-centric model of modern campaigning led to Manning's leadership abilities being questioned by a number of former members, including Stephen Harper, who accused Manning of inappropriately using a Can$31,000 personal expense allowance as leader. Some Reform supporters were frustrated by the party's decision to expand its political base into Quebec, as they continued to believe that the party should represent English-speaking Canada, and others from the right-wing and populist faction of the party were angry that Manning punished MPs Bob Ringma and David Chatters for comments justifying LGBT discrimination. During the campaign the Reform Party released a controversial television advertisement where the faces of four Quebecers, Prime Minister Jean Chrétien, Bloc Québécois leader Gilles Duceppe, Progressive Conservative leader Jean Charest, and Premier of Quebec Lucien Bouchard, were crossed out, followed by a message saying that Quebec politicians had dominated the federal government for too long and that the Reform Party would end this favoritism towards Quebec. The advertisement was harshly criticized by the other party leaders including accusations that Manning was "intolerant" and a "bigot" for having permitted the advertisement to be aired.

Reform began the campaign with Can$1.5 million in cash on hand, and had raised a total of Can$8 million. In contrast to the other parties, the vast majority of the money came from donations by individuals or small businesses.

The results for Reform were generally considered a minor tactical success. The party won 60 seats to displace the Bloc as Official Opposition, largely by building on its already heavy concentration of support in Western Canada. Strategically, Reform failed to make inroads into eastern Canada and lost its one seat in Ontario, leaving it effectively perceived as a Western regional party, despite making their first significant inroads into rural Ontario.

=== Bloc Québécois ===
Logo of the Bloc Québécois during the election.

The Bloc Québécois, under the leadership of Gilles Duceppe, lost its position of Official Opposition, falling to third place. The party's founding leader, Lucien Bouchard, had resigned in the aftermath of the 1995 Quebec referendum in order to become Premier of Quebec. Bouchard had been replaced by Michel Gauthier, but a lack of direction and party infighting caused their poll numbers to plummet, leaving them in danger of being overhauled by both the Liberals and the resurgent Progressive Conservatives. Duceppe, who took over as leader after Gauthier resigned, nonetheless made progress by emphasizing the lack of possibility of constitutional reform. While the party only finished 1.2 percentage points ahead of the Liberals in the province's popular vote, a more efficiently distributed vote (the Liberal vote was too concentrated in and around Montreal; elsewhere, they split the vote with the Progressive Conservatives) still allowed them to capture a comfortable majority of 44 out of Quebec's 75 seats.

=== New Democratic Party ===
Logo of the New Democratic Party during the election.

The New Democratic Party under the leadership of Alexa McDonough regained official party status that the party lost in the 1993 Canadian federal election. The party won the fourth largest share of total votes and won 21 seats. Notably, the party made a substantial showing in Atlantic Canada, a region where it had only elected three MPs in its entire history prior to the election.

=== Progressive Conservative Party ===
Logo of the Progressive Conservative Party during the election.

The Progressive Conservative Party under Jean Charest campaigned on securing national unity in Canada by recognizing Quebec as being a distinct society within Canada, along with the proposal of a "New Covenant" for Canadian confederation to be negotiated between the Federal and Provincial governments. The party's platform included the novelty of being publicly distributed on CD-ROM. Charest and the PCs benefited from rapidly rising in popularity amongst all language groups in Quebec, where voters were found to have preferred Charest over Gilles Duceppe, the leader of the Bloc Québécois.

The Progressive Conservatives faced multiple difficulties, as the party was not able to apply for federal financial assistance due to it not being an official party. The party's results in their previous bastion of Western Canada remained anemic, and the Reformers remained the dominant conservative political force in the west. Reform also made inroads into rural central and southern Ontario — traditionally the heartland of the Tories' provincial counterparts.

The Progressive Conservatives won the third largest number of the total votes and improved their situation in the House of Commons, regaining official party status after winning 20 seats. Despite finishing about half a point behind Reform in the nationwide popular vote, their only heavy concentrations of support were in Atlantic Canada and Quebec. Elsewhere, like in 1993, their support was too spread out to translate into victories in individual ridings. They only won one seat each in Ontario and Manitoba, and none west of Manitoba. The result, a disappointment for Charest, would lead to his resignation and eventual assumption of leadership of the Liberal Party of Quebec.

=== Green Party ===
Support for the Green Party of Canada was 79% higher than at the previous election, with its greatest success in British Columbia, where it received 2% of the vote. The Green Party remained almost entirely off the national media's radar. At 0.43% of the vote, and 1.64% of the vote in the ridings it contested, the Green Party remained a small but growing movement.

== Results ==

Summary of the 1997 House of Commons of Canada election results
Party	Party Leader	Candidates	Seats				Popular vote		
Party	Party Leader	Candidates	1993	Dissol.	Elected	% Change	#	%	Change
Liberal	Jean Chrétien	301	177	174	155	-12.4%	4,994,277	38.46%	-2.78pp
Reform	Preston Manning	227	52	50	60	+15.4%	2,513,080	19.35%	+0.66pp
Bloc Québécois	Gilles Duceppe	75	54	50	44	-18.5%	1,385,821	10.67%	-2.85pp
New Democratic	Alexa McDonough	301	9	9	21	+133.3%	1,434,509	11.05%	+4.17pp
Progressive Conservative	Jean Charest	301	2	2	20	+900%	2,446,705	18.84%	+2.80pp
Independent and No Affiliation		76	1	6	1		60,759	0.47%	-0.09pp
Green	Joan Russow	79	-	-	-	-	55,583	0.43%	+0.18pp
Natural Law	Neil Paterson	136	-	-	-	-	37,085	0.29%	+x
Christian Heritage	Ron Gray	53	-	-	-	-	29,085	0.22%	+x
Canadian Action	Paul T. Hellyer	58	*	-	-	*	17,502	0.13%	*
Marxist–Leninist	Hardial Bains	65	-	-	-	-	11,468	0.09%	+0.05pp
Vacant				4					
Total		1,672	295	295	301	+2.0%	12,985,874	100%	
Sources: Elections Canada — History of Federal Ridings since 1867

Notes:

*: Party did not nominate candidates in the previous election.

x: Less than 0.005% of the popular vote

=== Vote and seat summaries ===
Ternary plots - shift of electoral support (1993-1997)
1993

1997
Electoral districts identified by colours of winning parties

Popular vote
Liberal	38.46%
Reform	19.35%
PC	18.84%
NDP	11.05%
Bloc Québécois	10.67%
Green	0.43%
Others	1.20%

Seat totals
Liberal	51.50%
Reform	19.93%
Bloc Québécois	14.62%
NDP	6.98%
PC	6.64%
Independents	0.33%

=== Synopsis of results ===
= Newly created constituency
= Open seat
= Turnout is above national average
= Winning candidate held seat in previous House
= Incumbent had switched allegiance
= Previously incumbent in another riding
= Not incumbent; was previously elected to the House
= Incumbency arose from byelection gain
= Other incumbents renominated
= Previously a member of one of the provincial legislatures
= Multiple candidates

Results by riding — 1997 Canadian federal election (Note: No data available for transposition of votes from 1993 arising from the 1996 redistribution of seats.)
Riding		Winning party						Turnout (Note: Including spoiled ballots)	Votes (Note: Minor political parties receiving less than 1% of the popular vote (other than ones which fielded a significant number of candidates, or candidates receiving more than 1,000 votes) are aggregated under Other)										
Riding		1st place	Votes	Share	Margin #	Margin %	2nd place	Turnout	Lib	Ref	PC	NDP	BQ	Green	NLP	CHP	Ind	Other	Total
Athabasca	AB	Ref	14,673	54.62%	6,607	24.59%	Lib	49.4%	8,066	14,673	2,459	1,262	–	405	–	–	–	–	26,865
Calgary Centre	AB	Ref	19,936	40.08%	3,705	7.45%	Lib	57.9%	16,231	19,936	9,230	3,011	–	893	273	–	–	167	49,741
Calgary East	AB	Ref	13,348	44.98%	6,042	20.36%	PC	47.9%	6,766	13,348	7,306	1,926	–	–	329	–	–	–	29,675
Calgary Northeast	AB	Ref	18,719	52.11%	10,073	28.04%	Lib	50.9%	8,646	18,719	5,815	1,209	–	–	231	–	1,300	–	35,920
Calgary Southeast	AB	Ref	24,602	55.02%	14,035	31.39%	PC	63.7%	8,131	24,602	10,567	1,176	–	–	235	–	–	–	44,711
Calgary Southwest	AB	Ref	27,912	57.99%	18,206	37.83%	Lib	66.8%	9,706	27,912	8,617 (Note: Jan Brown was previously elected in 1993 under the Reform banner in Calgary Southeast.)	1,322	–	310	175	89	–	–	48,131
Calgary West	AB	Ref	24,878	47.20%	9,601	18.22%	Lib	64.7%	15,277	24,878	9,594	2,105	–	557	293	–	–	–	52,704
Calgary—Nose Hill	AB	Ref	25,788	51.80%	13,223	26.56%	Lib	64.9%	12,565	25,788	8,678	1,883	–	637	237	–	–	–	49,788
Crowfoot	AB	Ref	30,589	70.99%	23,910	55.49%	PC	64.1%	4,185	30,589	6,679	1,635	–	–	–	–	–	–	43,088
Edmonton East	AB	Ref	15,475	44.58%	3,470	10.00%	Lib	51.7%	12,005	15,475	2,535	4,096	–	211	107	287	–	–	34,716
Edmonton North	AB	Ref	16,124	44.30%	4,304	11.83%	Lib	55.6%	11,820	16,124	2,811	5,413	–	–	226	–	–	–	36,394
Edmonton Southeast	AB	Lib	14,745	45.98%	1,450	4.52%	Ref	56.0%	14,745	13,295	1,994	1,882	–	–	152	–	–	–	32,068
Edmonton Southwest	AB	Ref	22,697	51.34%	7,864	17.79%	Lib	62.6%	14,833	22,697	4,403	2,070	–	–	205	–	–	–	44,208
Edmonton West	AB	Lib	17,802	43.45%	1,410	3.44%	Ref	54.4%	17,802	16,392	2,919	3,386	–	210	143	–	–	122	40,974
Edmonton—Strathcona	AB	Ref	20,605	41.30%	2,951	5.92%	Lib	62.7%	17,654	20,605	3,614	7,251	–	406	153	–	115	92	49,890
Elk Island	AB	Ref	26,276	60.64%	17,740	40.94%	Lib	62.9%	8,536	26,276	5,416	2,544	–	–	–	–	559	–	43,331
Lakeland	AB	Ref	23,214	59.28%	16,238	41.47%	PC	56.6%	6,911	23,214	6,976	1,737	–	–	–	–	321	–	39,159
Lethbridge	AB	Ref	22,828	55.53%	14,941	36.35%	Lib	59.7%	7,887	22,828	7,436	2,211	–	–	–	418	–	326	41,106
Macleod	AB	Ref	24,225	68.02%	18,670	52.42%	PC	56.6%	4,137	24,225	5,555	1,444	–	–	253	–	–	–	35,614
Medicine Hat	AB	Ref	22,761	65.45%	16,682	47.97%	Lib	53.6%	6,079	22,761	4,219	1,719	–	–	–	–	–	–	34,778
Peace River	AB	Ref	22,351	58.94%	15,110	39.84%	Lib	53.6%	7,241	22,351	6,104	2,226	–	–	–	–	–	–	37,922
Red Deer	AB	Ref	28,622	68.38%	22,056	52.69%	PC	57.4%	4,785	28,622	6,566	1,660	–	–	227	–	–	–	41,860
St. Albert	AB	Ref	24,269	55.19%	11,732	26.68%	Lib	61.9%	12,537	24,269	4,645	2,172	–	–	–	–	354	–	43,977
Wetaskiwin	AB	Ref	26,443	65.96%	20,751	51.76%	Lib	61.0%	5,692	26,443	5,282	1,940	–	–	–	734	–	–	40,091
Wild Rose	AB	Ref	28,569	63.79%	20,063	44.79%	PC	60.5%	5,428	28,569	8,506	1,594	–	692	–	–	–	–	44,789
Yellowhead	AB	Ref	22,960	64.82%	16,642	46.98%	Lib	56.9%	6,318	22,960	4,383	1,759	–	–	–	–	–	–	35,420
Burnaby—Douglas	BC	NDP	19,058	43.08%	7,315	16.54%	Ref	68.1%	11,536	11,743	1,498	19,058	–	–	300	–	–	103	44,238
Cariboo—Chilcotin	BC	Ref	16,008	51.11%	9,515	30.38%	Lib	61.0%	6,493	16,008	3,707	4,406	–	707	–	–	–	–	31,321
Delta—South Richmond	BC	Ref	23,891	46.50%	4,820	9.38%	Lib	68.8%	19,071	23,891	2,829	4,715	–	–	245	325	308	–	51,384
Dewdney—Alouette	BC	Ref	20,446	47.26%	9,585	22.15%	Lib	63.0%	10,861	20,446	2,619	8,296	–	634	195	215	–	–	43,266
Esquimalt—Juan de Fuca	BC	Ref	20,370	43.43%	8,092	17.25%	Lib	65.0%	12,278	20,370	2,104	10,400	–	1,181	311	–	–	261	46,905
Fraser Valley	BC	Ref	33,101	62.85%	21,532	40.88%	Lib	67.0%	11,569	33,101	1,714	4,680	–	342	118	1,047	95	–	52,666
Kamloops	BC	NDP	16,138	36.07%	1,894	4.23%	Lib	67.3%	14,244	12,928	999	16,138	–	437	–	–	–	–	44,746
Kelowna	BC	Ref	25,246	50.01%	13,940	27.62%	Lib	62.8%	11,306	25,246	8,477	3,838	–	1,612	–	–	–	–	50,479
Kootenay—Columbia	BC	Ref	22,387	61.91%	16,014	44.29%	Lib	64.9%	6,373	22,387	1,479	5,133	–	786	–	–	–	–	36,158
Langley—Abbotsford	BC	Ref	31,664	62.02%	18,931	37.08%	Lib	67.3%	12,733	31,664	1,800	3,418	–	790	151	495	–	–	51,051
Nanaimo—Alberni	BC	Ref	25,069	49.86%	13,907	27.66%	NDP	67.1%	10,513	25,069	2,602	11,162	–	650	282	–	–	–	50,278
Nanaimo—Cowichan	BC	Ref	22,685	44.95%	9,573	18.97%	NDP	65.2%	10,663	22,685	2,131	13,112	–	928	224	–	–	720	50,463
New Westminster—Coquitlam—Burnaby	BC	Ref	15,915	34.47%	1,848	4.00%	NDP	65.4%	13,437	15,915	1,803	14,067	–	691	160	–	–	93	46,166
North Vancouver	BC	Ref	27,075	48.86%	8,269	14.92%	Lib	71.8%	18,806	27,075	2,740	5,075	–	982	162	–	365	203	55,408
Okanagan—Coquihalla	BC	Ref	24,570	53.06%	12,329	26.63%	Lib	65.1%	12,241	24,570	2,523	5,441	–	1,008	–	318	202	–	46,303
Okanagan—Shuswap	BC	Ref	24,952	53.13%	13,367	28.46%	Lib	67.1%	11,585	24,952	3,160	5,839	–	–	–	–	627	802	46,965
Port Moody—Coquitlam	BC	Ref	23,113	43.61%	7,477	14.11%	Lib	66.5%	15,636	23,113	2,927	10,444	–	695	190	–	–	–	53,005
Prince George–Bulkley Valley	BC	Ref	17,505	54.28%	10,435	32.36%	Lib	58.0%	7,070	17,505	2,615	3,935	–	507	–	300	315	–	32,247
Prince George—Peace River	BC	Ref	22,270	66.91%	16,587	49.84%	Lib	57.5%	5,683	22,270	1,911	2,989	–	429	–	–	–	–	33,282
Richmond	BC	Lib	18,165	43.81%	3,253	7.85%	Ref	64.9%	18,165	14,912	3,435	3,964	–	565	164	167	–	90	41,462
Saanich—Gulf Islands	BC	Ref	24,275	43.07%	6,533	11.59%	Lib	74.3%	17,742	24,275	4,243	8,080	–	1,546	248	–	–	234	56,368
Skeena	BC	Ref	13,402	42.35%	3,539	11.18%	NDP	63.7%	6,408	13,402	1,106	9,863	–	–	–	864	–	–	31,643
South Surrey—White Rock—Langley	BC	Ref	25,141	54.87%	11,331	24.73%	Lib	71.4%	13,810	25,141	2,068	3,616	–	756	129	169	–	130	45,819
Surrey Central	BC	Ref	17,461	34.67%	2,866	5.69%	Lib	61.6%	14,595	17,461	4,327	7,064	–	417	147	978	4,736	634	50,359
Surrey North (Note: Reform incumbent Margaret Bridgman was ousted from nomination by Chuck Cadman.)	BC	Ref	16,158	46.80%	6,435	18.64%	Lib	61.0%	9,723	16,158	1,093	6,579	–	280	70	291	200	129	34,523
Vancouver Centre	BC	Lib	20,878	40.76%	9,311	18.18%	Ref	64.7%	20,878	11,567	4,736	10,690	–	1,541	217	–	945	644	51,218
Vancouver East	BC	NDP	14,961	42.25%	1,838	5.19%	Lib	59.9%	13,123	4,287	964	14,961	–	1,221	185	226	282	158	35,407
Vancouver Island North	BC	Ref	22,769	47.54%	11,617	24.26%	NDP	64.4%	10,024	22,769	1,650	11,152	–	1,559	218	522	–	–	47,894
Vancouver Kingsway	BC	Lib	14,182	40.62%	3,520	10.08%	NDP	63.4%	14,182	6,412	1,385	10,662	–	811	210	–	1,088	161	34,911
Vancouver Quadra	BC	Lib	18,847	42.14%	6,507	14.55%	Ref	67.8%	18,847	12,340	7,546	4,486	–	1,155	211	–	–	135	44,720
Vancouver South—Burnaby	BC	Lib	16,648	42.66%	5,050	12.94%	Ref	64.2%	16,648	11,598	2,321	7,467	–	633	224	–	–	138	39,029
Victoria	BC	Lib	18,130	34.76%	2,737	5.25%	Ref	68.5%	18,130	15,393	3,589	11,419	–	2,806	340	–	131	353	52,161
West Kootenay—Okanagan	BC	Ref	18,954	46.78%	10,085	24.89%	NDP	66.7%	7,078	18,954	2,255	8,869	–	2,455	187	340	–	377	40,515
West Vancouver—Sunshine Coast	BC	Ref	20,092	40.05%	2,774	5.53%	Lib	66.8%	17,318	20,092	4,194	5,988	–	2,318	254	–	–	–	50,164
Brandon—Souris	MB	PC	13,216	35.59%	1,333	3.59%	Ref	66.9%	6,583	11,883	13,216	4,983	–	–	–	229	244	–	37,138
Charleswood—Assiniboine	MB	Lib	15,925	42.97%	7,261	19.59%	PC	67.6%	15,925	8,398	8,664	3,923	–	–	–	–	–	154	37,064
Churchill	MB	NDP	9,616	41.17%	2,764	11.83%	Lib	50.2%	6,852	4,438	2,452	9,616	–	–	–	–	–	–	23,358
Dauphin—Swan River	MB	Ref	12,668	35.49%	4,952	13.87%	PC	65.4%	7,408	12,668	7,716	7,575	–	–	–	–	326	–	35,693
Portage—Lisgar	MB	Ref	13,532	40.25%	1,449	4.31%	PC	60.6%	4,913	13,532	12,083	2,420	–	–	–	517	–	159	33,624
Provencher	MB	Lib	14,595	40.00%	1,797	4.93%	Ref	64.9%	14,595	12,798	5,955	3,137	–	–	–	–	–	–	36,485
Saint Boniface	MB	Lib	18,948	51.22%	12,285	33.21%	NDP	65.9%	18,948	6,658	4,555	6,663	–	–	–	–	–	171	36,995
Selkirk—Interlake	MB	Ref	10,937	28.30%	66	0.17%	Lib	65.5%	10,871	10,937	5,730	10,749	–	–	–	363	–	–	38,650
Winnipeg Centre	MB	NDP	10,979	40.89%	1,084	4.04%	Lib	57.0%	9,895	3,095	2,442	10,979	–	–	–	–	300	136	26,847
Winnipeg North Centre	MB	NDP	13,663	50.27%	5,862	21.57%	Lib	57.6%	7,801	3,678	1,742	13,663	–	–	169	–	–	128	27,181
Winnipeg North—St. Paul	MB	Lib	13,524	37.48%	4,037	11.19%	NDP	66.0%	13,524	7,108	5,430	9,487	–	–	–	442	–	92	36,083
Winnipeg South	MB	Lib	18,800	49.57%	11,290	29.77%	Ref	67.4%	18,800	7,510	6,547	4,629	–	–	153	–	191	94	37,924
Winnipeg South Centre	MB	Lib	20,006	55.89%	14,289	39.92%	NDP	64.9%	20,006	4,457	5,011	5,717	–	–	224	–	202	180	35,797
Winnipeg—Transcona	MB	NDP	16,640	50.27%	9,535	28.80%	Lib	60.4%	7,105	5,703	2,968	16,640	–	–	–	423	161	104	33,104
Acadie—Bathurst	NB	NDP	21,113	40.53%	2,692	5.17%	Lib	78.6%	18,421	–	12,560	21,113	–	–	–	–	–	–	52,094
Beauséjour—Petitcodiac	NB	NDP	18,504	38.99%	1,975	4.16%	Lib	75.9%	16,529	4,833	7,592	18,504	–	–	–	–	–	–	47,458
Charlotte	NB	PC	14,533	44.95%	6,224	19.25%	Lib	73.2%	8,309	6,814	14,533	2,397	–	–	280	–	–	–	32,333
Fredericton	NB	Lib	12,252	34.12%	1,417	3.95%	PC	67.2%	12,252	7,815	10,835	4,689	–	–	321	–	–	–	35,912
Fundy—Royal	NB	PC	16,715	41.52%	6,523	16.20%	Lib	76.2%	10,192	9,229	16,715	3,790	–	–	329	–	–	–	40,255
Madawaska—Restigouche	NB	PC	20,343	50.30%	5,386	13.32%	Lib	75.6%	14,957	–	20,343	4,211	–	–	933	–	–	–	40,444
Miramichi	NB	Lib	13,924	40.45%	3,354	9.74%	PC	77.2%	13,924	4,668	10,570	5,263	–	–	–	–	–	–	34,425
Moncton—Riverview—Dieppe	NB	Lib	20,860	44.57%	8,929	19.08%	PC	70.4%	20,860	6,073	11,931	7,510	–	–	424	–	–	–	46,798
Saint John	NB	PC	22,227	63.11%	16,615	47.18%	Lib	67.0%	5,612	3,467	22,227	3,679	–	–	232	–	–	–	35,217
Tobique—Mactaquac	NB	PC	12,125	35.90%	1,935	5.73%	Lib	72.0%	10,190	9,371	12,125	2,093	–	–	–	–	–	–	33,779
Bonavista—Trinity—Conception	NL	Lib	12,929	35.25%	570	1.55%	NDP	54.2%	12,929	–	10,332	12,359	–	–	–	–	1,054	–	36,674
Burin—St. George's	NL	PC	13,884	45.70%	2,169	7.14%	Lib	54.7%	11,715	–	13,884	4,784	–	–	–	–	–	–	30,383
Gander—Grand Falls	NL	Lib	13,409	52.21%	4,757	18.52%	PC	44.1%	13,409	–	8,652	3,620	–	–	–	–	–	–	25,681
Humber—St. Barbe—Baie Verte	NL	Lib	12,057	39.83%	232	0.77%	PC	54.9%	12,057	1,969	11,825	4,421	–	–	–	–	–	–	30,272
Labrador	NL	Lib	6,182	50.62%	1,567	12.83%	NDP	60.7%	6,182	573	842	4,615	–	–	–	–	–	–	12,212
St. John's East	NL	PC	17,286	38.98%	4,826	10.88%	NDP	58.8%	12,048	1,977	17,286	12,460	–	388	191	–	–	–	44,350
St. John's West	NL	PC	19,393	44.07%	3,076	6.99%	Lib	60.4%	16,317	1,113	19,393	6,866	–	–	319	–	–	–	44,008
Bras d'Or	NS	NDP	17,575	41.30%	1,217	2.86%	Lib	75.2%	16,358	–	8,620	17,575	–	–	–	–	–	–	42,553
Cumberland—Colchester	NS	PC	18,610	43.63%	7,608	17.83%	Lib	69.8%	11,002	5,970	18,610	6,058	–	–	193	–	826	–	42,659
Dartmouth	NS	NDP	12,326	32.57%	2,028	5.36%	Lib	65.0%	10,298	4,446	10,183	12,326	–	–	156	–	438	–	37,847
Halifax	NS	NDP	21,837	49.02%	11,476	25.76%	PC	68.9%	9,638	2,422	10,361	21,837	–	–	197	–	–	89	44,544
Halifax West	NS	NDP	16,013	34.63%	1,729	3.74%	Lib	67.3%	14,284	4,843	10,848	16,013	–	–	179	–	–	70	46,237
Kings—Hants	NS	PC	17,401	36.27%	2,886	6.02%	Lib	65.7%	14,515	6,424	17,401	9,101	–	–	278	–	251	–	47,970
Pictou—Antigonish—Guysborough	NS	PC	18,196	42.34%	5,345	12.44%	Lib	72.0%	12,851	3,416	18,196	8,284	–	–	228	–	–	–	42,975
Sackville—Musquodoboit Valley—Eastern Shore	NS	NDP	12,433	30.37%	41	0.10%	PC	66.6%	10,750	5,155	12,392	12,433	–	–	211	–	–	–	40,941
South Shore	NS	PC	14,136	36.00%	2,739	6.97%	Lib	67.3%	11,397	5,302	14,136	8,137	–	–	298	–	–	–	39,270
Sydney—Victoria	NS	NDP	22,455	51.10%	10,886	24.77%	Lib	74.3%	11,569	–	9,920	22,455	–	–	–	–	–	–	43,944
West Nova	NS	PC	13,187	34.31%	3,310	8.61%	Lib	73.9%	9,877	7,229	13,187	7,862	–	–	275	–	–	–	38,430
Algoma—Manitoulin	ON	Lib	13,810	41.31%	5,457	16.33%	Ref	61.5%	13,810	8,353	3,367	7,897	–	–	–	–	–	–	33,427
Barrie—Simcoe—Bradford	ON	Lib	23,549	43.48%	7,507	13.86%	Ref	64.0%	23,549	16,042	10,735	2,580	–	506	–	421	–	327	54,160
Beaches—East York	ON	Lib	21,844	47.93%	11,114	24.39%	NDP	67.3%	21,844	6,534	5,611	10,730	–	589	264	–	–	–	45,572
Bramalea—Gore—Malton	ON	Lib	18,933	46.37%	8,278	20.27%	PC	61.0%	18,933	8,685	10,655	2,281	–	–	–	–	–	279	40,833
Brampton Centre	ON	Lib	18,615	48.85%	7,798	20.47%	Ref	60.3%	18,615	10,817	5,621	2,923	–	–	–	–	–	127	38,103
Brampton West—Mississauga	ON	Lib	27,297	59.99%	18,850	41.42%	PC	61.1%	27,297	7,569	8,447	2,192	–	–	–	–	–	–	45,505
Brant	ON	Lib	24,125	52.97%	13,689	30.06%	Ref	63.1%	24,125	10,436	5,781	5,201	–	–	–	–	–	–	45,543
Broadview—Greenwood	ON	Lib	21,108	49.76%	7,205	16.98%	NDP	68.1%	21,108	3,247	3,238	13,903	–	426	205	–	211	85	42,423
Bruce—Grey	ON	Lib	17,896	36.79%	1,735	3.57%	Ref	68.8%	17,896	16,161	11,139	3,446	–	–	–	–	–	–	48,642
Burlington	ON	Lib	22,042	44.12%	5,698	11.40%	PC	70.0%	22,042	8,662	16,344	2,561	–	–	–	–	–	352	49,961
Cambridge	ON	Lib	17,673	36.74%	6,906	14.36%	Ref	64.8%	17,673	10,767	9,299	9,813	–	–	–	–	548	–	48,100
Carleton—Gloucester	ON	Lib	29,862	58.96%	19,902	39.29%	PC	74.3%	29,862	7,404	9,960	2,831	–	–	349	–	–	244	50,650
Davenport	ON	Lib	17,195	65.86%	12,388	47.45%	NDP	62.4%	17,195	–	2,628	4,807	–	551	–	–	384	543	26,108
Don Valley East	ON	Lib	25,394	59.20%	16,784	39.13%	PC	66.0%	25,394	5,167	8,610	2,981	–	–	192	–	170	384	42,898
Don Valley West	ON	Lib	26,209	52.95%	11,163	22.55%	PC	72.3%	26,209	4,669	15,046	2,922	–	378	173	–	–	104	49,501
Dufferin—Peel—Wellington—Grey	ON	Lib	20,957	42.63%	6,197	12.61%	Ref	66.9%	20,957	14,760	11,089	2,355	–	–	–	–	–	–	49,161
Durham	ON	Lib	19,878	43.34%	6,819	14.87%	Ref	64.1%	19,878	13,059	8,995	3,250	–	–	–	682	–	–	45,864
Eglinton—Lawrence	ON	Lib	25,985	59.24%	16,008	36.50%	PC	67.0%	25,985	3,547	9,977	3,955	–	–	397	–	–	–	43,861
Elgin—Middlesex—London	ON	Lib	17,890	39.99%	6,391	14.29%	PC	64.3%	17,890	10,307	11,499	3,260	–	508	–	1,275	–	–	44,739
Erie—Lincoln	ON	Lib	17,542	42.84%	4,754	11.61%	Ref	63.4%	17,542	12,788	6,317	2,509	–	–	228	1,301	–	267	40,952
Essex	ON	Lib	22,052	46.07%	7,872	16.45%	NDP	62.8%	22,052	8,545	3,086	14,180	–	–	–	–	–	–	47,863
Etobicoke Centre	ON	Lib	27,345	54.56%	16,322	32.56%	PC	71.8%	27,345	8,638	11,023	2,661	–	–	267	–	–	189	50,123
Etobicoke North	ON	Lib	22,236	61.84%	16,639	46.27%	Ref	61.1%	22,236	5,597	4,276	3,350	–	–	174	–	–	324	35,957
Etobicoke—Lakeshore	ON	Lib	21,180	46.22%	10,671	23.28%	PC	67.6%	21,180	8,697	10,509	4,085	–	315	139	–	–	903 (Note: Former Liberal Cabinet minister Paul Hellyer stood for the Canadian Action Party, receiving 770 votes.)	45,828
Glengarry—Prescott—Russell	ON	Lib	34,986	71.98%	28,877	59.41%	PC	68.7%	34,986	4,599	6,109	2,289	–	417	207	–	–	–	48,607
Guelph—Wellington	ON	Lib	25,004	47.73%	13,844	26.43%	PC	66.6%	25,004	9,054	11,160	5,456	–	589	–	972	–	146	52,381
Haldimand—Norfolk—Brant	ON	Lib	21,043	45.50%	8,495	18.37%	Ref	65.8%	21,043	12,548	9,704	2,516	–	437	–	–	–	–	46,248
Halton	ON	Lib	26,017	47.25%	12,239	22.23%	PC	67.8%	26,017	12,221	13,778	2,452	–	600	–	–	–	–	55,068
Hamilton East	ON	Lib	16,991	49.48%	10,121	29.47%	NDP	56.3%	16,991	5,716	3,913	6,870	–	–	–	376	312	160	34,338
Hamilton Mountain	ON	Lib	21,128	45.81%	12,251	26.56%	PC	63.6%	21,128	8,154	8,877	7,440	–	–	–	–	–	520	46,119
Hamilton West	ON	Lib	20,951	50.02%	13,303	31.76%	NDP	61.9%	20,951	6,285	6,510	7,648	–	–	323	–	–	170	41,887
Hastings—Frontenac—Lennox and Addington	ON	Lib	18,399	39.47%	6,172	13.24%	PC	67.8%	18,399	12,045	12,227	3,255	–	–	189	505	–	–	46,620
Huron—Bruce	ON	Lib	24,240	51.35%	14,315	30.32%	Ref	70.4%	24,240	9,925	9,223	3,037	–	–	–	781	–	–	47,206
Kenora—Rainy River	ON	Lib	14,084	41.93%	4,302	12.81%	Ref	60.6%	14,084	9,782	2,799	6,922	–	–	–	–	–	–	33,587
Kent—Essex	ON	Lib	21,451	50.20%	12,510	29.28%	Ref	59.3%	21,451	8,941	6,634	4,323	–	291	–	621	–	470	42,731
Kingston and the Islands	ON	Lib	25,632	49.51%	14,336	27.69%	PC	62.8%	25,632	6,761	11,296	6,433	–	902	–	751	–	–	51,775
Kitchener Centre	ON	Lib	23,089	48.00%	12,129	25.22%	PC	64.3%	23,089	9,550	10,960	4,503	–	–	–	–	–	–	48,102
Kitchener—Waterloo	ON	Lib	25,111	47.71%	13,498	25.65%	PC	62.6%	25,111	10,502	11,613	4,725	–	–	–	–	265	413	52,629
Lambton—Kent—Middlesex	ON	Lib	21,155	46.24%	8,553	18.69%	Ref	65.6%	21,155	12,602	7,256	2,440	–	256	–	1,785	257	–	45,751
Lanark—Carleton	ON	Lib	28,151	45.32%	11,386	18.33%	Ref	71.7%	28,151	16,765	13,213	3,022	–	463	181	–	–	318	62,113
Leeds—Grenville	ON	Lib	19,123	39.47%	3,487	7.20%	PC	69.9%	19,123 (Note: Joe Jordan was the son of the previous incumbent Jim Jordan.)	10,476	15,636	1,757	–	1,102	119	241	–	–	48,454
London North Centre	ON	Lib	23,891	51.72%	15,819	34.25%	PC	60.2%	23,891	7,016	8,072	5,679	–	685	–	375	336	138	46,192
London West	ON	Lib	24,710	48.55%	13,752	27.02%	PC	68.2%	24,710	8,839	10,958	5,291	–	497	–	515	–	83	50,893
London—Fanshawe	ON	Lib	20,497	51.20%	13,659	34.12%	Ref	58.7%	20,497	6,838	5,499	6,754	–	442	–	–	–	–	40,030
Markham	ON	PC	20,449	44.70%	3,639	7.95%	Lib	67.5%	16,810	4,947	20,449	1,482	–	–	258	–	1,584	218	45,748
Mississauga Centre	ON	Lib	25,881	65.04%	19,832	49.84%	PC	61.3%	25,881	5,770	6,049	1,900	–	–	–	–	–	192	39,792
Mississauga East	ON	Lib	23,780	59.95%	15,928	40.15%	PC	64.5%	23,780	5,617	7,852	2,156	–	–	–	–	–	262	39,667
Mississauga South	ON	Lib	21,207	49.94%	11,130	26.21%	PC	65.9%	21,207	8,307	10,077	2,302	–	–	199	–	141	229	42,462
Mississauga West	ON	Lib	30,598	61.21%	21,438	42.89%	Ref	64.8%	30,598	9,160	8,102	2,128	–	–	–	–	–	–	49,988
Nepean—Carleton	ON	Lib	28,366	48.80%	13,033	22.42%	Ref	75.4%	28,366	15,333	11,072	2,788	–	–	238	–	–	331	58,128
Niagara Centre	ON	Lib	24,115	49.70%	12,062	24.86%	Ref	65.1%	24,115	12,053	5,827	5,510	–	–	363	515	–	143	48,526
Niagara Falls	ON	Lib	15,868	38.36%	4,882	11.80%	Ref	63.6%	15,868	10,986	9,935	4,052	–	374	154	–	–	–	41,369
Nickel Belt	ON	Lib	19,489	48.85%	6,134	15.38%	NDP	68.1%	19,489	4,771	1,763	13,355	–	–	145	–	–	369	39,892
Nipissing	ON	Lib	19,786	56.34%	12,396	35.29%	Ref	63.8%	19,786	7,390	5,666	2,280	–	–	–	–	–	–	35,122
Northumberland	ON	Lib	21,182	45.77%	9,724	21.01%	PC	65.1%	21,182	10,602	11,458	2,678	–	–	–	355	–	–	46,275
Oak Ridges	ON	Lib	27,394	54.73%	15,162	30.29%	PC	64.2%	27,394	7,568	12,232	2,411	–	–	281	–	–	167	50,053
Oakville	ON	Lib	24,487	47.68%	9,014	17.55%	PC	72.9%	24,487	9,050	15,473	2,343	–	–	–	–	–	–	51,353
Oshawa	ON	Lib	15,925	37.72%	3,951	9.36%	Ref	58.6%	15,925	11,974	6,972	7,350	–	–	–	–	–	–	42,221
Ottawa Centre	ON	Lib	25,987	45.19%	12,341	21.46%	NDP	70.2%	25,987	6,651	9,391	13,646	–	855	211	–	373	386	57,500
Ottawa South	ON	Lib	31,725	59.01%	23,203	43.16%	Ref	72.3%	31,725	8,522	8,115	4,374	–	440	167	–	–	421	53,764
Ottawa West—Nepean	ON	Lib	29,511	54.02%	17,910	32.78%	Ref	72.7%	29,511	11,601	8,489	4,163	–	416	153	–	211	90	54,634
Ottawa—Vanier	ON	Lib	30,728	61.87%	23,974	48.27%	PC	66.8%	30,728	4,868	6,754	5,952	–	651	330	–	241	138	49,662
Oxford	ON	Lib	16,281	35.98%	1,575	3.48%	PC	66.9%	16,281	9,533	14,706	3,406	–	–	181	956	–	192	45,255
Parkdale—High Park	ON	Lib	20,692	48.27%	11,930	27.83%	NDP	68.7%	20,692	5,891	5,926	8,762	–	696	267	–	–	635	42,869
Parry Sound—Muskoka	ON	Lib	17,752	41.60%	6,317	14.80%	PC	69.1%	17,752	10,909	11,435	1,700	–	513	133	–	–	236	42,678
Perth—Middlesex	ON	Lib	19,583	44.01%	8,510	19.12%	PC	67.6%	19,583	9,180	11,073	3,806	–	–	–	858	–	–	44,500
Peterborough	ON	Lib	25,594	46.55%	9,835	17.89%	Ref	66.8%	25,594	15,759	8,757	4,874	–	–	–	–	–	–	54,984
Pickering—Ajax—Uxbridge	ON	Lib	26,003	52.09%	15,201	30.45%	PC	66.8%	26,003	10,537	10,802	2,576	–	–	–	–	–	–	49,918
Prince Edward—Hastings	ON	Lib	22,415	51.59%	13,110	30.17%	PC	63.6%	22,415	9,219	9,305	2,512	–	–	–	–	–	–	43,451
Renfrew—Nipissing—Pembroke	ON	Lib	19,569	40.25%	6,534	13.44%	Ref	68.3%	19,569	13,035	12,352	3,242	–	–	183	–	–	236	48,617
Sarnia—Lambton	ON	Lib	19,494	47.35%	9,322	22.64%	Ref	65.2%	19,494	10,172	6,008	3,320	–	–	125	1,472	402	175	41,168
Sault Ste. Marie	ON	Lib	16,871	44.49%	6,588	17.37%	NDP	66.6%	16,871	7,536	3,010	10,283	–	–	219	–	–	–	37,919
Scarborough Centre	ON	Lib	25,185	57.39%	17,079	38.92%	Ref	64.7%	25,185	8,106	6,976	3,619	–	–	–	–	–	–	43,886
Scarborough East	ON	Lib	23,065	54.33%	14,768	34.79%	PC	64.8%	23,065	7,011	8,297	3,330	–	278	135	171	–	164	42,451
Scarborough Southwest	ON	Lib	20,675	53.40%	12,757	32.95%	Ref	63.0%	20,675	7,918	5,294	4,345	–	482	–	–	–	–	38,714
Scarborough—Agincourt	ON	Lib	25,995	65.13%	18,880	47.30%	PC	66.5%	25,995	4,291	7,115	2,512	–	–	–	–	–	–	39,913
Scarborough—Rouge River	ON	Lib	28,636	74.80%	24,272	63.40%	PC	62.1%	28,636	3,102	4,364	1,874	–	–	170	–	–	139	38,285
Simcoe North	ON	Lib	22,775	44.39%	8,412	16.40%	Ref	66.9%	22,775	14,363	10,849	2,488	–	388	230	–	–	213	51,306
Simcoe—Grey	ON	Lib	17,895	35.21%	481	0.95%	Ref	65.4%	17,895	17,414	11,761	3,090	–	–	–	664	–	–	50,824
St. Catharines	ON	Lib	21,081	43.46%	6,052	12.48%	Ref	65.5%	21,081	15,029	6,503	4,657	–	–	245	688	–	308	48,511
St. Paul's	ON	Lib	26,389	54.26%	14,869	30.57%	PC	69.1%	26,389	3,564	11,520	6,028	–	597	221	–	–	317	48,636
Stoney Creek	ON	Lib	23,750	49.97%	13,540	28.49%	Ref	65.7%	23,750	10,210	9,440	3,392	–	–	261	472	–	–	47,525
Stormont—Dundas	ON	Lib	22,857	52.53%	13,912	31.97%	Ref	64.9%	22,857	8,945	8,741	2,671	–	–	295	–	–	–	43,509
Sudbury	ON	Lib	22,223	55.42%	13,752	34.29%	NDP	62.5%	22,223	5,198	3,459	8,471	–	–	247	–	–	502	40,100
Thornhill	ON	Lib	25,747	59.00%	14,230	32.61%	PC	67.2%	25,747	3,441	11,517	2,008	–	–	261	–	665	–	43,639
Thunder Bay—Atikokan	ON	Lib	14,287	42.66%	6,170	18.42%	NDP	60.2%	14,287	5,642	5,443	8,117	–	–	–	–	–	–	33,489
Thunder Bay—Superior North	ON	Lib	16,745	51.83%	10,040	31.08%	NDP	58.6%	16,745	5,286	3,569	6,705	–	–	–	–	–	–	32,305
Timiskaming—Cochrane	ON	Lib	20,580	59.43%	15,694	45.32%	PC	63.0%	20,580	4,541	4,886	4,623	–	–	–	–	–	–	34,630
Timmins—James Bay	ON	Lib	16,829	50.25%	4,884	14.58%	NDP	61.7%	16,829	2,464	2,251	11,945	–	–	–	–	–	–	33,489
Toronto Centre—Rosedale	ON	Lib	22,945	49.19%	13,348	28.62%	NDP	67.0%	22,945	3,646	8,993	9,597	–	577	270	–	145	469	46,642
Trinity—Spadina	ON	Lib	18,215	45.30%	1,802	4.48%	NDP	67.1%	18,215	1,649	2,793	16,413	–	392	194	–	288	270	40,214
Vaughan—King—Aurora	ON	Lib	33,502	64.25%	24,911	47.78%	PC	65.6%	33,502	7,273	8,591	2,250	–	–	–	–	524	–	52,140
Victoria—Haliburton	ON	Lib	18,205	34.05%	1,181	2.21%	Ref	68.1%	18,205	17,024	14,283	3,456	–	–	–	–	–	504	53,472
Waterloo—Wellington	ON	Lib	20,038	44.01%	5,896	12.95%	Ref	63.1%	20,038	14,142	8,175	3,180	–	–	–	–	–	–	45,535
Wentworth—Burlington	ON	Lib	19,584	41.65%	6,103	12.98%	PC	69.1%	19,584	10,267	13,481	3,694	–	–	–	–	–	–	47,026
Whitby—Ajax	ON	Lib	23,551	47.69%	11,574	23.44%	Ref	66.8%	23,551	11,977	10,107	3,354	–	–	–	–	–	394	49,383
Willowdale	ON	Lib	27,311	58.45%	17,268	36.95%	PC	68.1%	27,311	6,007	10,043	2,833	–	–	268	–	–	266	46,728
Windsor West	ON	Lib	21,877	55.20%	12,466	31.45%	NDP	55.1%	21,877	5,295	2,452	9,411	–	398	–	–	–	199	39,632
Windsor—St. Clair	ON	Lib	16,496	39.89%	2,259	5.46%	NDP	59.6%	16,496	5,899	4,253	14,237	–	357	–	–	–	115	41,357
York Centre	ON	Lib	27,864	72.06%	24,246	62.71%	NDP	64.0%	27,864	2,876	3,323	3,618	–	389	242	–	–	354	38,666
York North	ON	Lib	22,942	45.25%	9,697	19.13%	Ref	65.9%	22,942	13,245	11,308	1,996	–	–	187	799	–	220	50,697
York South—Weston	ON	Ind	17,163	45.03%	4,431	11.63%	Lib	68.1%	12,732	2,363	1,925	3,552	–	171	–	–	17,261 (Note: John Nunziata, the winning candidate, had previously served as the Liberal MP for the constituency since 1984.)	112	38,116
York West	ON	Lib	21,254	73.62%	18,401	63.74%	NDP	61.0%	21,254	2,598	2,165	2,853	–	–	–	–	–	–	28,870
Cardigan	PE	Lib	7,555	45.05%	99	0.59%	PC	77.4%	7,555	–	7,456	1,761	–	–	–	–	–	–	16,772
Egmont	PE	Lib	8,498	48.42%	744	4.24%	PC	70.9%	8,498	–	7,754	1,300	–	–	–	–	–	–	17,552
Hillsborough	PE	Lib	7,630	40.87%	1,879	10.06%	NDP	71.2%	7,630	476	4,594	5,751	–	–	74	145	–	–	18,670
Malpeque	PE	Lib	7,912	45.09%	718	4.09%	PC	72.2%	7,912	580	7,194	1,863	–	–	–	–	–	–	17,549
Abitibi	QC	Lib	16,803	43.75%	2,635	6.86%	BQ	60.7%	16,803	–	6,531	909	14,168	–	–	–	–	–	38,411
Ahuntsic	QC	Lib	28,971	49.25%	10,282	17.48%	BQ	79.7%	28,971	–	9,520	1,051	18,689	–	589	–	–	–	58,820
Anjou—Rivière-des-Prairies	QC	Lib	24,189	47.31%	7,631	14.92%	BQ	77.7%	24,189	–	9,405	752	16,558	–	–	–	–	227	51,131
Argenteuil—Papineau	QC	BQ	21,202	40.87%	3,554	6.85%	Lib	71.4%	17,648	–	11,171	836	21,202	–	509	505	–	–	51,871
Beauce	QC	Lib	22,156	49.10%	10,154	22.50%	BQ	63.9%	22,156	–	9,385	735	12,002	–	–	–	843	–	45,121
Beauharnois—Salaberry	QC	BQ	20,449	39.72%	3,223	6.26%	Lib	77.3%	17,226	–	13,160	652	20,449	–	–	–	–	–	51,487
Beauport—Montmorency—Orléans	QC	BQ	21,994	42.99%	8,131	15.89%	Lib	70.3%	13,863	1,255	12,748	885	21,994	–	–	–	–	419	51,164
Bellechasse—Etchemins—Montmagny—L'Islet	QC	Lib	14,100	33.47%	47	0.11%	BQ	68.0%	14,100	611	12,840	520	14,053	–	–	–	–	–	42,124
Berthier—Montcalm	QC	BQ	32,707	52.65%	17,634	28.38%	Lib	70.7%	15,073	–	13,338	1,009	32,707	–	–	–	–	–	62,127
Bonaventure—Gaspé—Îles-de-la-Madeleine—Pabok	QC	BQ	15,983	41.26%	179	0.46%	Lib	68.9%	15,804	–	6,297	649	15,983	–	–	–	–	–	38,733
Bourassa	QC	Lib	23,765	52.21%	8,952	19.67%	BQ	74.7%	23,765	–	5,937	999	14,813	–	–	–	–	–	45,514
Brome—Missisquoi	QC	Lib	19,261	42.37%	6,491	14.28%	PC	76.0%	19,261	–	12,770	781	12,652	–	–	–	–	–	45,464
Brossard—La Prairie	QC	Lib	24,676	46.64%	7,334	13.86%	BQ	78.9%	24,676	–	9,982	906	17,342	–	–	–	–	–	52,906
Chambly	QC	BQ	26,109	49.29%	12,048	22.74%	Lib	75.6%	14,061	–	11,802	998	26,109	–	–	–	–	–	52,970
Champlain	QC	BQ	20,687	44.00%	7,772	16.53%	Lib	73.7%	12,915	–	12,784	632	20,687	–	–	–	–	–	47,018
Charlesbourg	QC	BQ	21,556	38.45%	3,928	7.01%	Lib	73.9%	17,628	1,135	13,811	963	21,556	–	709	–	–	266	56,068
Charlevoix	QC	BQ	19,792	54.18%	9,954	27.25%	Lib	64.1%	9,838	–	6,443	454	19,792	–	–	–	–	–	36,527
Châteauguay	QC	BQ	25,909	45.47%	6,742	11.83%	Lib	75.9%	19,167	–	11,112	794	25,909	–	–	–	–	–	56,982
Chicoutimi	QC	PC	18,598	43.69%	317	0.74%	BQ	68.5%	4,839	–	18,598	853	18,281	–	–	–	–	–	42,571
Compton—Stanstead	QC	PC	18,125	44.60%	4,758	11.71%	BQ	74.9%	8,119	–	18,125	587	13,367	–	439	–	–	–	40,637
Drummond	QC	BQ	18,577	42.26%	3,800	8.64%	PC	73.3%	10,165	–	14,777	441	18,577	–	–	–	–	–	43,960
Frontenac—Mégantic	QC	BQ	14,433	37.10%	465	1.20%	Lib	75.8%	13,968	–	9,885	252	14,433	–	365	–	–	–	38,903
Gatineau	QC	Lib	25,298	46.42%	9,512	17.45%	PC	66.6%	25,298	–	15,786	982	11,391	–	448	445	–	150	54,500
Hochelaga—Maisonneuve	QC	BQ	21,938	46.02%	5,630	11.81%	Lib	72.6%	16,308	–	7,583	825	21,938	–	577	–	–	444	47,675
Hull—Aylmer	QC	Lib	25,835	54.11%	15,913	33.33%	BQ	70.4%	25,835	935	8,461	1,317	9,922	586	266	275	–	151	47,748
Joliette	QC	BQ	22,605	46.54%	5,188	10.68%	PC	73.6%	7,452	–	17,417	502	22,605	–	594	–	–	–	48,570
Jonquière	QC	BQ	16,415	48.57%	4,607	13.63%	PC	67.2%	4,874	–	11,808	353	16,415	–	348	–	–	–	33,798
Kamouraska—Rivière-du-Loup—Temiscouata—Les-Basques	QC	BQ	16,518	38.27%	2,399	5.56%	Lib	66.6%	14,119	–	11,623	420	16,518	–	480	–	–	–	43,160
Lac-Saint-Jean	QC	BQ	21,506	63.53%	14,397	42.53%	Lib	68.0%	7,109	–	4,845	391	21,506	–	–	–	–	–	33,851
Lac-Saint-Louis	QC	Lib	42,613	69.02%	31,320	50.73%	PC	83.6%	42,613	1,556	11,293	1,548	4,347	–	386	–	–	–	61,743
LaSalle—Émard	QC	Lib	32,317	60.87%	19,364	36.48%	BQ	78.0%	32,317	–	6,445	920	12,953	–	453	–	–	–	53,088
Laurentides	QC	BQ	28,647	45.73%	9,594	15.32%	Lib	70.4%	19,053	–	14,096	844	28,647	–	–	–	–	–	62,640
Laurier—Sainte-Marie	QC	BQ	26,546	54.65%	15,392	31.69%	Lib	70.0%	11,154	–	5,808	2,180	26,546	1,167	–	–	1,378	338	48,571
Laval Centre	QC	BQ	22,668	39.62%	2,446	4.28%	Lib	76.4%	20,222	–	13,132	1,188	22,668	–	–	–	–	–	57,210
Laval East	QC	BQ	23,093	38.46%	3,814	6.35%	Lib	79.5%	19,279	–	16,912	765	23,093	–	–	–	–	–	60,049
Laval West	QC	Lib	31,566	48.90%	12,019	18.62%	BQ	79.1%	31,566	–	12,365	1,072	19,547	–	–	–	–	–	64,550
Lévis	QC	BQ	27,870	45.22%	10,614	17.22%	Lib	71.7%	17,256	–	14,630	1,881	27,870	–	–	–	–	–	61,637
Longueuil	QC	BQ	20,977	50.24%	8,830	21.15%	Lib	71.5%	12,147	–	7,773	857	20,977	–	–	–	–	–	41,754
Lotbinière	QC	BQ	13,069	37.07%	3,007	8.53%	Lib	72.3%	10,062	–	9,690	445	13,069	–	–	–	1,988	–	35,254
Louis-Hébert	QC	BQ	23,653	39.85%	3,698	6.23%	Lib	77.2%	19,955	1,024	13,002	1,161	23,653	–	558	–	–	–	59,353
Manicouagan	QC	BQ	12,203	47.07%	1,532	5.91%	Lib	67.6%	10,671	–	2,009	1,041	12,203	–	–	–	–	–	25,924
Matapédia—Matane	QC	BQ	15,694	44.79%	5,136	14.66%	Lib	65.2%	10,558	–	7,991	417	15,694	–	377	–	–	–	35,037
Mercier	QC	BQ	24,649	51.06%	10,588	21.93%	Lib	71.8%	14,061	–	8,500	772	24,649	–	–	–	–	297	48,279
Mount Royal	QC	Lib	30,115	62.26%	20,025	41.40%	Ind	78.7%	30,115	–	5,006	966	1,981	–	211	–	10,090	–	48,369
Notre-Dame-de-Grâce—Lachine	QC	Lib	29,582	56.56%	19,232	36.77%	PC	77.7%	29,582	–	10,350	2,315	8,797	–	569	–	692	–	52,305
Outremont	QC	Lib	22,271	50.15%	9,663	21.76%	BQ	74.0%	22,271	–	5,424	2,862	12,608	–	868	–	–	378	44,411
Papineau—Saint-Denis	QC	Lib	26,260	53.90%	12,177	24.99%	BQ	75.5%	26,260	–	6,227	1,196	14,083	–	–	–	471	481	48,718
Pierrefonds—Dollard	QC	Lib	38,476	66.43%	27,930	48.22%	PC	79.9%	38,476	1,134	10,546	1,060	6,239	–	465	–	–	–	57,920
Pontiac—Gatineau—Labelle	QC	Lib	22,736	45.78%	6,839	13.77%	BQ	66.7%	22,736	–	9,187	1,097	15,897	–	479	269	–	–	49,665
Portneuf	QC	BQ	18,615	43.30%	5,941	13.82%	Lib	69.1%	12,674	–	10,587	1,112	18,615	–	–	–	–	–	42,988
Québec	QC	BQ	24,817	44.52%	6,755	12.12%	Lib	73.0%	18,062	–	10,309	2,556	24,817	–	–	–	–	–	55,744
Quebec East	QC	BQ	23,245	39.37%	4,706	7.97%	Lib	72.8%	18,539	1,483	14,533	1,240	23,245	–	–	–	–	–	59,040
Repentigny	QC	BQ	33,283	56.29%	20,788	35.16%	Lib	73.7%	12,495	–	12,436	916	33,283	–	–	–	–	–	59,130
Richelieu	QC	BQ	26,421	54.80%	12,480	25.88%	Lib	76.1%	13,941	–	6,827	1,028	26,421	–	–	–	–	–	48,217
Richmond—Arthabaska	QC	PC	21,687	41.50%	2,368	4.53%	BQ	74.0%	10,613	–	21,687	641	19,319	–	–	–	–	–	52,260
Rimouski—Mitis	QC	BQ	17,282	47.00%	6,170	16.78%	Lib	68.2%	11,112	–	7,901	479	17,282	–	–	–	–	–	36,774
Roberval	QC	BQ	16,207	52.10%	8,031	25.82%	Lib	62.0%	8,176	–	6,312	412	16,207	–	–	–	–	–	31,107
Rosemont	QC	BQ	23,313	47.03%	7,361	14.85%	Lib	70.9%	15,952	–	7,727	1,637	23,313	–	–	–	494	447	49,570
Saint-Bruno—Saint-Hubert	QC	BQ	23,759	45.13%	6,480	12.31%	Lib	76.6%	17,279	–	10,579	1,032	23,759	–	–	–	–	–	52,649
Saint-Eustache—Sainte-Thérèse	QC	BQ	25,807	46.45%	9,527	17.15%	Lib	73.1%	16,280	–	12,522	947	25,807	–	–	–	–	–	55,556
Saint-Hyacinthe—Bagot	QC	BQ	21,116	42.91%	4,803	9.76%	PC	74.3%	10,970	–	16,313	809	21,116	–	–	–	–	–	49,208
Saint-Jean	QC	BQ	22,441	46.06%	9,202	18.89%	Lib	77.0%	13,239	–	11,938	755	22,441	–	–	–	–	347	48,720
Saint-Lambert	QC	Lib	19,436	41.18%	978	2.07%	BQ	75.8%	19,436	–	8,084	921	18,458	–	–	–	–	304	47,203
Saint-Laurent—Cartierville	QC	Lib	34,598	70.14%	27,737	56.23%	PC	77.0%	34,598	681	6,861	910	6,276	–	–	–	–	–	49,326
Saint-Léonard—Saint-Michel	QC	Lib	36,088	69.76%	27,631	53.41%	BQ	76.6%	36,088	–	5,990	1,198	8,457	–	–	–	–	–	51,733
Saint-Maurice	QC	Lib	22,266	47.30%	1,602	3.40%	BQ	80.3%	22,266	–	3,657	489	20,664	–	–	–	–	–	47,076
Shefford	QC	PC	17,897	36.90%	521	1.07%	BQ	75.4%	12,699	–	17,897	531	17,376	–	–	–	–	–	48,503
Sherbrooke	QC	PC	32,228	59.53%	16,142	29.82%	BQ	73.5%	4,720	–	32,228	628	16,086	–	477	–	–	–	54,139
Témiscamingue	QC	BQ	18,528	46.62%	5,850	14.72%	Lib	67.3%	12,678	–	7,879	654	18,528	–	–	–	–	–	39,739
Terrebonne—Blainville	QC	BQ	28,066	50.36%	13,379	24.01%	Lib	75.0%	14,687	–	11,883	1,090	28,066	–	–	–	–	–	55,726
Trois-Rivières	QC	BQ	21,267	42.46%	5,575	11.13%	Lib	73.7%	15,692	–	12,102	528	21,267	–	503	–	–	–	50,092
Vaudreuil—Soulanges	QC	Lib	23,676	45.00%	6,102	11.60%	BQ	79.6%	23,676	573	9,760	538	17,574	–	490	–	–	–	52,611
Verchères	QC	BQ	30,074	53.74%	17,359	31.02%	Lib	77.7%	12,715	–	12,428	750	30,074	–	–	–	–	–	55,967
Verdun—Saint-Henri	QC	Lib	21,424	46.93%	6,271	13.74%	BQ	72.5%	21,424	380	6,838	1,156	15,153	–	498	–	–	205	45,654
Westmount—Ville-Marie	QC	Lib	26,972	60.10%	19,170	42.72%	PC	70.7%	26,972	–	7,802	2,566	5,078	751	212	–	1,328	166	44,875
Battlefords—Lloydminster	SK	Ref	13,125	42.75%	4,590	14.95%	NDP	63.2%	6,155	13,125	2,888	8,535	–	–	–	–	–	–	30,703
Blackstrap	SK	Ref	13,502	36.88%	3,137	8.57%	Lib	70.1%	10,365	13,502	2,414	10,117	–	–	208	–	–	–	36,606
Churchill River	SK	NDP	7,288	34.53%	538	2.55%	Ref	57.2%	5,994	6,750	1,077	7,288	–	–	–	–	–	–	21,109
Cypress Hills—Grasslands	SK	Ref	16,439	49.10%	9,309	27.80%	Lib	71.6%	7,130	16,439	3,421	6,490	–	–	–	–	–	–	33,480
Palliser	SK	NDP	12,553	38.21%	2,963	9.02%	Ref	67.3%	7,579	9,590	2,777	12,553	–	–	350	–	–	–	32,849
Prince Albert	SK	Ref	12,508	38.06%	2,090	6.36%	NDP	64.5%	6,965	12,508	2,702	10,418	–	–	–	–	–	275	32,868
Qu'Appelle	SK	NDP	12,269	42.40%	4,485	15.50%	Ref	62.8%	6,868	7,784	1,633	12,269	–	–	–	–	–	382	28,936
Regina—Lumsden—Lake Centre	SK	NDP	12,677	42.28%	4,335	14.46%	Ref	66.4%	7,079	8,342	1,605	12,677	–	–	–	–	–	277	29,980
Saskatoon—Humboldt	SK	Ref	11,218	33.07%	220	0.65%	NDP	64.8%	8,972	11,218	2,499	10,998	–	–	234	–	–	–	33,921
Saskatoon—Rosetown—Biggar	SK	NDP	12,095	43.72%	3,084	11.15%	Ref	59.9%	4,438	9,011	1,931	12,095	–	–	–	–	–	191	27,666
Souris—Moose Mountain	SK	Ref	13,732	41.17%	4,655	13.96%	Lib	67.0%	9,077	13,732	4,333	6,209	–	–	–	–	–	–	33,351
Wanuskewin	SK	Ref	12,854	39.16%	4,061	12.37%	NDP	63.8%	8,020	12,854	2,602	8,793	–	–	138	–	420	–	32,827
Wascana	SK	Lib	14,077	41.88%	4,547	13.53%	NDP	66.2%	14,077	7,261	2,477	9,530	–	–	–	–	–	264	33,609
Yorkton—Melville	SK	Ref	17,216	50.07%	8,633	25.11%	NDP	66.9%	6,481	17,216	2,101	8,583	–	–	–	–	–	–	34,381
Nunavut	Terr	Lib	3,302	45.89%	1,565	21.75%	PC	59.8%	3,302	447	1,737	1,710	–	–	–	–	–	–	7,196
Western Arctic	Terr	Lib	5,564	41.64%	2,985	22.34%	NDP	58.4%	5,564	1,966	1,687	2,579	–	–	–	–	1,567	–	13,363
Yukon	Terr	NDP	4,002	28.94%	509	3.68%	Ref	69.8%	3,036	3,493	1,928 (Note: Ken McKinnon was previously Commissioner of Yukon (1986-1995) and a member of the Yukon Territorial Council (1961-1964, 1967-1974).)	4,002	–	–	–	136	1,234	–	13,829

=== Results by province ===
Party Name		BC	AB	SK	MB	ON	QC	NB	NS	PE	NL	NT	YK	Total
Liberal	Seats:	6	2	1	6	101	26	3		4	4	2		155
Liberal	Popular vote:	28.8	24.0	24.7	34.3	49.5	36.7	32.9	28.4	44.8	37.9	43.1	22.0	38.5
Reform	Seats:	25	24	8	3									60
Reform	Vote:	43.1	54.6	36.0	23.7	19.1	0.3	13.1	9.7	1.5	2.5	11.7	25.3	19.4
Bloc Québécois	Seats:						44							44
Bloc Québécois	Vote:						37.9							10.7
New Democrats	Seats:	3		5	4			2	6				1	21
New Democrats	Vote:	18.2	5.7	30.9	23.2	10.7	2.0	18.4	30.4	15.1	22.0	20.9	28.9	11.0
Progressive Conservative	Seats:				1	1	5	5	5		3			20
Progressive Conservative	Vote:	6.2	14.4	7.8	17.8	18.8	22.2	35.0	30.8	38.3	36.8	16.7	13.9	18.8
Other	Seats:					1								1
Other	Vote:	0.6	0.2	0.1	0.3	0.6	0.4		0.4		0.5	7.6	8.9	0.5
Total seats:		34	26	14	14	103	75	10	11	4	7	2	1	301
Parties that won no seats:
Green	Vote:	2.0	0.4			0.4	0.1				0.2			0.4
Natural Law	Vote:	0.3	0.3	0.2	0.1	0.2	0.3	0.6	0.4	0.1	0.2			0.3
Christian Heritage	Vote:	0.4	0.1		0.4	0.4				0.2			1.0	0.2
Canadian Action	Vote:			0.3		0.2								0.1
Marxist–Leninist	Vote:	0.1			0.2	0.1	0.1							0.1

Source: Elections Canada

=== Notes ===
- Number of parties: 10
  - First appearance: Canadian Action Party
  - Final appearance: Reform Party of Canada
  - Final appearance before hiatus: Christian Heritage Party of Canada (returned in 2004)
- 1997 was one of only three elections in Canadian history (the others were 1993 and 2008) where the official Opposition did not have the majority of the opposition's seats. 60 seats were held by the Reform Party, yet 86 seats for the other opposition parties and independents combined.
- 1997 was the only election to date in which five different parties won the popular vote in a province or territory (the Liberals won in Manitoba, Newfoundland and Labrador, the Northwest Territories, Ontario and Prince Edward Island; Reform in Alberta, British Columbia and Saskatchewan; the BQ in Quebec; the NDP in the Yukon Territory; and the PCs in New Brunswick and Nova Scotia). Consequently, it was also the last time the PCs won a province or territory.

=== 10 closest ridings ===
1. Sackville—Eastern Shore, NS: Peter Stoffer, NDP def. Ken Streatch, PC by 41 votes
2. Bellechasse—Etchemins—Montmagny—L'Islet, QC: Gilbert Normand, Lib def. François Langlois, BQ by 47 votes
3. Selkirk—Interlake, MB: Howard Hilstrom, Ref def. Jon Gerrard, Lib by 66 votes
4. Cardigan, PE: Lawrence MacAulay, Lib def. Dan Hughes, PC by 99 votes
5. Bonaventure—Gaspé—Îles-de-la-Madeleine—Pabok, QC: Yvan Bernier, BQ def. Patrick Gagnon, Lib by 179 votes
6. Saskatoon—Humboldt, SK: Jim Pankiw, Ref def. Dennis Gruending, NDP by 220 votes
7. Humber—St. Barbe—Baie Verte, NF: Gerry Byrne, Lib def. Art Bull, PC by 232 votes
8. Chicoutimi, QC: André Harvey, PC def. Gilbert Fillion, BQ by 317 votes
9. Frontenac—Mégantic, QC: Jean-Guy Chrétien, BQ def. Manon Lecours, Lib by 465 votes
10. Simcoe—Grey, ON: Paul Bonwick, Lib def. Paul Shaw, Ref by 481 votes

== See also ==
- List of Canadian federal general elections
- List of political parties in Canada

Articles on parties' candidates in this election:

- Independents
- Canadian Action
- Christian Heritage
- Greens
- Independent Rhinoceros
- Liberals
- Marxist-Leninists
- Natural Law
- New Democrats
- Progressive Conservatives
- Reform Party
