= Canadian Alliance candidates in the 2000 Canadian federal election =

The Canadian Alliance fielded several candidates in the 2000 federal election, and won sixty-six seats to become the Official Opposition party in the House of Commons of Canada. Many of the party's candidates have their own biography pages; information about others may be found here.

This page also provides information for Canadian Alliance candidates who contested by-elections between 2000 and 2003.

All electoral information is taken from Elections Canada.

== Quebec ==
Note: this section is incomplete.

Riding	Candidate's Name	Notes	Gender	Residence	Occupation	Votes	%	Rank
Bas-Richelieu—Nicolet—Bécancour	Frédéric Lajoie	Lajoie was previously an Action démocratique du Québec candidate in the 1998 provincial election. He supported Canadian Alliance leader Stockwell Day in May 2001, at a time when others in the party were calling for Day's resignation.	M		Administrator	2,078	4.68	3rd
Brome—Missisquoi	Jacques Loyer	Loyer joined the Royal Canadian Mounted Police in 1974 and took a leave of absence to run for office in 2000. During the campaign, he called for harsher prison sentences and new immigration laws that would allow only what he described as the "most desirable" immigrants to enter Canada.	M		Police officer	1,977	4.61	4th
Terrebonne—Blainville	Guylaine St-Georges	St-Georges has worked as a kayaking coach and art teacher.	F		Manager	3,741	6.71	3rd
Verdun–Saint-Henri–Saint-Paul–Pointe Saint-Charles	Jacques Gendron	Gendron is a pharmacist based in Île des Sœurs. He was a member of the Quebec Liberal Party in 2000 and co-authored a public letter encouraging provincial Liberals to support the Canadian Alliance at the federal level. He subsequently ran for the provincial Liberal Party in the 2014 provincial election in Montarville and was narrowly defeated by Coalition Avenir Québec incumbent Nathalie Roy. He has also sought election to Montreal city council twice: in 1998 as a candidate of Nouveau Montréal and in 2013 as a candidate of the Équipe Andrée Champoux pour Verdun party. A different Jacques Gendron ran for mayor of Longueuil in 1982 and in a 1987 by-election and for the Canadian House of Commons in 1972.	M		Pharmacist	2,098	5.15	4th

== Ontario ==
=== Eglinton—Lawrence: Joel Etienne ===
Etienne is a lawyer in Toronto, and was twenty-six years old at the time of the election. He said that he chose to enter the campaign to protest Canada's support for a United Nations resolution that was critical of Israel. He also supported tax incentives for religious school tuition. He received 5,497 votes (13.26%), finishing third against Liberal incumbent Joseph Volpe. Etienne has been involved in several high-profile legal cases since 2000, including a 2004 defence of an illegal Jamaican immigrant who argued that his life would be in danger if he was deported. Etienne succeeded in winning him the right to stay in Canada. In 2005, he was listed as co-chair of Toronto Friends of Falun Gong.

=== Hastings—Frontenac—Lennox and Addington: Sean McAdam ===
McAdam is a political consultant. He first campaigned for public office in the 1993 federal election as the Reform Party candidates in Kingston and the Islands. He was twenty-four years old at the time, and a Political Science student at Queen's University (Kingston Whig-Standard, 23 October 1993). He finished third against Liberal incumbent Peter Milliken, and later worked on the Ottawa staff of federal Reform Party leader Preston Manning.

McAdam ran for the Reform Party again in the 1997 election, defeating Vito D. Luceno and Laurie Greenidge for the nomination in Hastings—Frontenac—Lennox and Addington (KWS, 7 October 1996). He focused on gun control as a primary issue (KWS, 17 May 1997), and finished third against Liberal Larry McCormick. After the election, McAdam worked for two years in the office of Reform Member of Parliament (MP) Art Hanger before becoming Manning's Question Period advisor (National Post, 1 May 1999). He was an early supporter of the Reform Party's United Alternative initiative, which eventually led to the creation of the Canadian Alliance (KWS, 2 June 1998). He worked as a senior aide to Stockwell Day in late 2000, after Day defeated Manning to become Alliance leader.

McAdam won the HFLA Alliance nomination over Vito Luceno and former Member of Provincial Parliament Gary Fox for the 2000 election (KWS, 23 October 2000) and, although the riding was seen as winnable for his party, lost to McCormick a second time (KWS, 28 November 2000. He continued to work for Day until March 2001, when he returned to work for Art Hanger. In April, he supported Hanger's call for Day to resign as leader (National Post, 24 April 2001). He later said, "Once I started to work with [Day] in a senior position it was clear to me that he wasn't the man for the job" (KWS, 17 May 2001). He worked as a senior aide to the breakaway Democratic Representative Caucus later in the year. He was also critical of plans to have Stephen Harper challenge Day for the Alliance leadership, writing that Harper "seems to focus more on the differences than on what can unite" (National Post, 16 August 2001).

McAdam has also worked as a palm reader and hypnotist (National Post, 1 May 1999).

Electoral record
Election	Division	Party	Votes	%	Place	Winner
1993 federal	Kingston and the Islands	Reform	7,175	12.51	3/7	Peter Milliken, Liberal
1997 federal	Hastings—Frontenac—Lennox and Addington	Reform	12,045		3/6	Larry McCormick, Liberal
2000 federal	Hastings—Frontenac—Lennox and Addington	Alliance	13,227		2/8	Larry McCormick, Liberal

=== Kingston and the Islands: Kevin Hunter Goligher ===
Goligher was born in Montreal, Quebec, Canada. He is a veteran of the Canadian Forces and has done extensive service overseas, including in Cyprus and Sinai (KWS, 6 May and 31 October 2000). He lived in Kingston, Ontario during the 1980s, and returned to the city in 1995 after retiring from the army. Goligher was forty-six years old in 2000, worked as a freelance writer, and was a member of the Kingston Whig-Standard Community Editorial Board (KWS, 17 January 2000). Originally a Progressive Conservative, he joined the Canadian Alliance in 2000 after a request to campaign for the party. He defeated former riding president Siobhain Fiene to win the nomination (KWS, 26 October 2000), and received 7,904 votes (15.44%) to finish third against Liberal incumbent Peter Milliken.

=== Ottawa—Vanier: Nestor Gayowsky ===
Gayowsky was born in Brandon, Manitoba to a Ukrainian Canadian family, and was a career diplomat for thirty-six years before running for public office. He served in Scandinavia, Finland, Italy and the Soviet Union, and became Canada's first consul general to Ukraine in 1991 (Edmonton Journal, 29 December 1990). After Canada recognized Ukraine's independence from the Soviet Union, Gayowsky was named chargé d'affaires of the Canadian embassy (Toronto Star, 27 January 1992). He later represented the European Bank for Reconstruction and Development in Kyiv (Financial Post, 20 November 1993).

He received 7,600 votes (15.79%) in 2000, finishing second against Liberal incumbent Mauril Belanger. A newspaper report from the election lists him as 66 years old. He supported a bridge over the Ottawa River east of Kettle Island, and criticized the Liberal government's record on taxes and patronage (Ottawa Citizen, 18 November 2000).

Gayowsky later moved to British Columbia, and was campaign manager for Conservative candidate James Lunney in the 2004 election (Victoria Times-Colonist, 17 May 2004). He remains interested in Ukrainian affairs, and was an OCSE observer for the late 2004 Ukrainian presidential election, won by Victor Yushchenko (Ottawa Citizen, 4 December 2004).

=== Parry Sound-Muskoka: George Stripe ===
George Stripe was thirty-seven years old during the election and worked as a supply teacher with the Near North District School Board. He received 9,569 votes (25.39%), finishing second to Liberal incumbent Andy Mitchell.

=== Peterborough: Eric Mann ===
Eric John Allan Mann is a beef farmer in Smith-Ennismore-Lakefield, near the city of Peterborough. He is active in the local Baptist community. A graduate of Peterborough Teachers College, he taught elementary school for six years in the 1970s. He was also a trustee on the Peterborough County Board of Education from 1985 to 1994. In 1988, he criticized an Ontario Court of Appeal decision that struck down classroom recitations of the Lord's Prayer.

Mann supported the Reform Party of Canada in the 1990s and backed Stockwell Day's bid to lead the successor Canadian Alliance in 2000. He was fifty years old at the time of the 2000 election, and was president of the East Central Christian Farmers Association and chair of the Smith-Ennismore Police Services Board. He won the Alliance nomination for Peterborough in an upset over Nancy Branscombe, a prominent national organizer who had been the Reform Party's nominee in 1997. During the campaign, Mann openly disagreed with his party's position on recognizing indigenous communities simply as municipalities; he said that it would "not be appropriate to have [these communities] under the complete control of the provincial governments." He received 14,924 votes (28.54%), finishing second against Liberal incumbent Peter Adams.

Mann later supported the Alliance's merger with the more moderate Progressive Conservative Party of Canada to create the Conservative Party of Canada.

=== St. Catharines: Randy Taylor Dumont ===
Before running for office, Randy Dumont was for many years a popular radio personality on CKTB FM in St. Catharines under the name Randy Taylor. He was laid off from the station in May 2000 by a program manager who argued that he did not fit the station's "moderate approach" (Hamilton Spectator, 6 May 2000), and briefly worked at CFRB in Toronto prior to the election. He used his stage name as an unofficial middle name for the 2000 campaign (Vancouver Sun, 30 October 2000).

One national reporter described him as a "shock jock" in the style of Howard Stern, writing that he once ran a stunt contest won by "a man who nailed his testicles to a board". In response to criticisms, Dumont argued that he was simply playing a character when on-air (Globe and Mail, 22 November 2000). He was quoted as saying during the campaign, "We cannot afford to have an 'everything for everyone' health care system any more...We have the perfect opportunity now to look at private enterprise to deliver much-needed health services." (Canada NewsWire, 10 November 2000)

Dumont received 15,871 votes (33.97%), finishing second against Liberal incumbent Walt Lastewka. He returned to CFRB in 2002–2003, before leaving to do a television show entitled "Spirit of Life".

=== Scarborough Southwest: Nabil El-Khazen ===
El-Khazen was born in the British Mandate of Palestine (Globe and Mail, 19 October 1998). He holds a Bachelor of Engineering degree from Damascus University (1969), a Master of Engineering degree from the American University of Beirut (1973), and Master of Science degree in Physics from York University (1982). He has also completed PhD level courses at York University.

El-Khazen has worked as a consulting structural engineer since 1978, was given Professional Engineer status in Ontario since 1979, and is the owner of El-Khazen Consulting Ltd. In 1996, he became a member of the Maintenance Transportation Policy Advisory Committee of the Progressive Conservative Party of Ontario. He supported Preston Manning's United Alternative movement in 2002, which led to the creation of the Canadian Alliance.

He received 4,912 votes (13.73%) in the 2000 election, finishing third against Liberal incumbent Tom Wappel. He was 54 years old at the time of the election (Toronto Star, 19 November 2000).

El-Khazen was a liaison between Liberal Member of Parliament (MP) Judy Sgro and the PEO Toronto-Humber & Mississauga Chapters after the 2000 election.

=== Sudbury: Mike Smith ===
Mike Smith moved to Sudbury in 1965, and studied marketing at Cambrian College. He worked in sales, and had been a consultant at Nordic Bearings Inc. for fourteen years by the time of the 2000 election.

Smith first ran for the Reform Party in 1993, and later supported that party's re-constitution as the Canadian Alliance. In 2000, he said that his party would introduce tax cuts while maintaining social programs, and would eliminate regional development corporations such as FedNor. He also argued that the Canadian Alliance had been unfairly caricatured as intolerant. When the Liberals won a majority government in the election, Smith said that they would "bankrupt this country and kill off all our social programs".

In 2003, Smith supported the Canadian Alliance's merger with the Progressive Conservative Party of Canada to create the Conservative Party of Canada. He supported Belinda Stronach in the leadership campaign that followed.

Electoral record
Election	Division	Party	Votes	%	Place	Winner
1993 federal	Sudbury	Reform	5,788	13.68	2/9	Diane Marleau, Liberal
2000 federal	Sudbury	Canadian Alliance	6,554	18.90	2/7	Diane Marleau, Liberal

=== Whitby—Ajax: Shaun Gillespie ===
Gillespie was 35 years old at the time of the election (Toronto Star, 23 November 2000), and worked as a police officer in Toronto (Toronto Star, 28 October 2000). He took a leave of absence from his official duties, and campaigned on a "law and order" platform (Toronto Star, 28 November 2000). He received 13,159 votes (26.98%), finishing second against Liberal incumbent Judi Longfield.

In earlier years, Gillespie had played bass guitar in a new-wave band with Our Lady Peace guitarist Mike Turner (Toronto Star, 11 November 2000).

== Manitoba ==
=== Gary Nestibo (Brandon—Souris) ===
Nestibo was born on 19 May 1951 in Deloraine. He works a farmer in Goodlands, Manitoba, and has been a director of Keystone Agricultural Producers and the Western Canadian Wheat Growers Association, which opposes the single-desk marketing policy of the Canadian Wheat Board. He unsuccessfully tried to start a $4.5 million hog operation in Deloraine in 1998, as a director of Southwest Stock Farms Ltd.

Nestibo sought and won the Progressive Conservative Party of Manitoba nomination for Arthur-Virden in April 1999, defeating rival candidate Dale Smeltz on the third ballot. Larry Maguire and Grant Fotheringham had been eliminated in earlier counts. One of his nominators described Nestibo as a family man who was "categorically willing to defend the Biblical principles this nation was founded upon". He was 47 years old.

Soon after the nomination meeting, Nestibo was accused of participating in an alleged land-for-votes scheme in the previous year's municipal elections. Nestibo and several others were alleged to have purchased marginal land in the Rural Municipality of Winchester for a low fee, and then voted for Jim Holden, the seller, in a council election. The party investigated Nestibo's actions, and determined that he had acted in an unethical manner. His nomination was annulled, and he was expelled from the party. Nestibo maintained that he did nothing wrong, saying that the land purchase was part of a compensation agreement for damaged floodland and had nothing to do with the election.

His wife, Lorna Nestibo, contested the vacated Arthur-Virden nomination and lost to Larry Maguire. Despite the controversy, Nestibo indicated that he would continue to support the Progressive Conservative Party.

Nestibo's membership in the provincial Progressive Conservative Party was reinstated in early 2000. Later in the year, he announced that he would support the newly formed Canadian Alliance at the federal level. In May 2000, he hosted a fundraising dinner for Alliance leadership candidate Stockwell Day in Brandon. In October, he won the Brandon—Souris nomination in an upset over former Brandon mayor Reg Atkinson and Jason Shaw. Nestibo's campaign focused on agricultural issues, although he also articulated socially conservative positions on abortion and same-sex marriage. He received 11,678 votes (31.87%), finishing second against Progressive Conservative Party of Canada incumbent Rick Borotsik.

Nestibo was appointed to the Turtle Mountain Conservation District in 2004.

=== Reginald A. Smith (Winnipeg Centre) ===
Smith was born on 18 March 1928 in Winnipeg. He was a civil servant at the Manitoba Land Title Office & Lands Branch from 1945 to 1951, and worked in land administration for the oil sector from 1951 to 1974. He was the secretary-manager of a recreational club in Calgary from 1974 to 1978, and owned a restaurant in White Rock, British Columbia until retiring in 1989.

He became involved with the Reform Party while living in British Columbia in 1989, and remained active after returning to Winnipeg.

Electoral record
Election	Division	Party	Votes	%	Place	Winner
1993 federal	Winnipeg North Centre	Reform	2,275		3/8	David Walker, Liberal
1997 federal	Winnipeg Centre	Reform	3,095	11.53	3/8	Pat Martin, New Democratic Party
2000 federal	Winnipeg Centre	Alliance	3,975		3/6	Pat Martin, New Democratic Party

=== Bill Hancock (Winnipeg South) ===
A Winnipeg Free Press report from 1997 identifies Hancock as a thirty-five-year-old political analyst (24 March 1997). In 2000, he listed himself as a consultant. He received 12,638 votes (30.04%), finishing second against Liberal Party incumbent Reg Alcock.

=== Betty Granger (Winnipeg South Centre) ===
Granger's campaign was marked by controversy over comments that she made concerning an "Asian invasion" of Canadian universities. She suspended her campaign in late November 2004, after acknowledging that her comments were inappropriate. Her name remained on the ballot, and she received 3,210 votes (8.53%) to finish fourth against Liberal candidate Anita Neville.

=== Shawn Rattai (Winnipeg—Transcona) ===
Rattai was a 33-year-old accountant. He won the Alliance nomination without opposition. His campaign office was vandalized during the election period, and messages such as "Don't vote 4 bigots or homophobes like the Alliance" were scrawled on the windows in black marker. Rattai argued that the Alliance stood for tolerance, and said that the messages were unfair. Following the campaign, he charged that some of his brochures had been altered without his knowledge to portray him as a neo-Nazi. Winnipeg police launched a hate crimes investigation into the manner.

He received 8,336 votes (25.44%), finishing second against New Democratic Party incumbent Bill Blaikie. Rattai acknowledged that he had little chance of winning the election, and was quoted as saying, "Our attitude was, 'Let's go in and have some fun.' We're not here to beat on Bill Blaikie. I respect Bill Blaikie."

He served on the Alliance's governing council after the election. In early 2001, he criticized former Reform Party leader Preston Manning for allegedly undermining Alliance leader Stockwell Day. After being appointed chairman of the Alliance fund later in the year, Rattai introduced significant internal spending cuts to target the party's debt.

== by-election candidates ==
=== Denis Simard (St. Boniface, by-election, 13 May 2002) ===
Simard was born, raised and educated in St. Boniface, Winnipeg, Manitoba. At the time of his candidacies, he worked as a diesel mechanic in that city. He joined the Reform Party in 1991, and remained with the party until it joined the Canadian Alliance in 2000 (Winnipeg Free Press, 25 May 1997). He campaigned for the Reform Party in St. Boniface in the 1997 federal election, and finished third against Liberal Ron Duhamel with 6,658 votes.

Simard was the Manitoba organizer for Tom Long's bid to lead the Canadian Alliance in 2000. When Long was eliminated from the contest after the first ballot, he turned his support to the eventual winner, Stockwell Day (Regina Leader Post, 28 June 2000). Simard sought the Canadian Alliance nomination for Provencher in the 2000 federal election, but finished fourth against Vic Toews (Winnipeg Free Press, 31 October 2000).

Simard received 4,497 votes (21.73%) in the 2002 by-election, finishing second against his distant cousin, Liberal candidate Raymond Simard.

A different Denis Simard campaigned for the Reform Party in a 1996 by-election in Lac-Saint-Jean, while a third Denis Simard has campaigned for the Parti Québécois.
