= Jim Downey (politician) =

Canadian politician (born 1942)

Member of the Manitoba Legislative Assembly for Arthur-Virden
- In office October 11, 1977 – September 21, 1999
- Preceded by: Douglas Watt
- Succeeded by: Larry Maguire

Personal details
- Born: James Erwin Downey; August 10, 1942 (age 83) Melita, Manitoba, Canada
- Party: Progressive Conservative Party of Manitoba
- Profession: farmer

James Erwin Downey (born August 10, 1942) is a politician in Manitoba, Canada. He was a member of the Legislative Assembly of Manitoba from 1977 to 1999, and served as a cabinet minister in the Progressive Conservative governments of Sterling Lyon and Gary Filmon.

== Early life ==
Downey was born in Melita, Manitoba. He served as an Air Cadet, and received an Agriculture Diploma from the University of Manitoba. Before entering political life, he worked as a farmer and auctioneer.

== Manitoba politics ==
Downey was first elected to the Manitoba legislature in the provincial election of 1977, scoring a fairly easy victory in the southwestern rural riding of Arthur (generally regarded as a safe seat for the party). Lyon's Progressive Conservatives defeated the New Democratic Party under Edward Schreyer in this election, and Downey was appointed as Minister of Agriculture on October 24, 1977. He held this position until November 30, 1981, when the NDP returned to power. Downey himself was easily re-elected in the 1981 election, defeating his NDP opponent by over 3500 votes.

Despite a credible challenge from the new Confederation of Regions Party, Downey was again re-elected without too much difficulty in the 1986 provincial election. Two years later, he faced a stronger challenge from Liberal Douglas Mosset, but still retained his seat by over 2000 votes.

The Progressive Conservatives under Gary Filmon formed a minority government after this election, and Downey returned to cabinet on May 9, 1988 as Minister of Northern Affairs with responsibility for Native Affairs, the Manitoba Natural Resources Development Act, A.E. McKenzie Co. Ltd., the Manitoba Oil and Gas Corporation Act and the Communities Economic Development Fund Act. On April 21, 1989 he was also named minister responsible for Seniors.

Downey was again re-elected in the general election of 1990, defeating Liberal Glen McKinnon (later a federal MP) by 2688 votes. He was named Deputy Premier on September 27, 1990, and on February 5, 1991 was named as Minister of Rural Development. After a cabinet shuffle on January 14, 1992, Downey was named Minister of Northern and Native Affairs and Minister of Energy and Mines. He was transferred again on September 10, 1993, this time to the Ministry of Industry, Trade and Tourism with responsibility for the Communities Development Corporation Act.

Downey was again re-elected without difficulty in the 1995 provincial election, and continued to serve as Deputy Premier and Industry Minister until February 5, 1999. He did not seek re-election later in the year, but instead served as campaign manager for the Progressive Conservatives in their loss to Gary Doer's New Democrats. (He had played the same role for the party in their successful campaign of 1995.)

In 2000, Downey endorsed Tom Long's bid to lead the newly formed Canadian Alliance party (National Post, 10 May 2000). In 2004, he endorsed Belinda Stronach for leader of the new Conservative Party of Canada.

Downey ran for a directorship on the Canadian Wheat Board in 2002, campaigning against the board's monopoly status. He lost to incumbent Bill Nicholson, who supports the current system.
