= Bill Nicholson (Canadian administrator) =

Bill Nicholson is a Canadian farmer and administrator, and is one of ten elected directors on the Canadian Wheat Board. Nicholson supports the CWB's single-desk marketing approach as the best option for farmers, and has opposed efforts to introduce open market competition to wheat and barley sales.

Nicholson operates a farming business in Shoal Lake, Manitoba. He was first elected to the Canadian Wheat Board's Advisory Committee in 1994, defeating incumbent candidate Larry Maguire in the western Manitoba region. This election was fought along clear ideological lines, with Maguire opposing the CWB's monopoly status and Nicholson supporting it. Nicholson, who was 38 years old at the time, was a delegate with the Manitoba Pool Elevators and a member of the National Farmers Union.

Nicholson criticized the group Farmers For Justice in 1995, after some of its members tried to market their own wheat in the United States in contravention of Canadian law. He argued that these farmers were conducting private transactions "at the expense of all other farmers", and said that costs would be higher and returns lower if the Wheat Board were forced out of existence.

The Wheat Board was restructured in 1998, and Nicholson was elected as a director for the western Manitoba and eastern Saskatchewan region. He defended the Wheat Board's monopoly status in a 2000 interview with the Winnipeg Free Press, arguing that single-desk marketing allowed farmers to look after their interests and avoid exploitation from grain merchants and railways. He was re-elected in 2002, defeating former Progressive Conservative Party of Manitoba cabinet minister Jim Downey after two rounds of voting. Downey had opposed the single-desk approach.

Nicholson has recently criticized Conservative Agriculture Minister Chuck Strahl's efforts to reduce the Wheat Board's monopoly status. He was re-elected to a third term as director in 2006.
