= Lee Clark (politician) =

Canadian politician

Member of Parliament for Brandon—Souris
- In office May 24, 1983 – September 8, 1993
- Preceded by: Walter Dinsdale
- Succeeded by: Glen McKinnon

Personal details
- Born: Walter Leland Rutherford Clark; 16 December 1936 Davidson, Saskatchewan, Canada
- Died: 10 August 2008 (aged 71) Lake Metigoshe, North Dakota, U.S.
- Party: Progressive Conservative
- Education: University of Saskatchewan
- Profession: Politician; academic

Walter Leland Rutherford "Lee" Clark (16 December 1936 – 10 August 2008) was a Progressive Conservative party member of the House of Commons of Canada. He was born in Davidson, Saskatchewan and was a professor by career.

== Background ==
Clark attended the University of Saskatchewan. There, he met and, in 1959, married Barbara Woods. Clark went on to study at the University of Oregon and, after teaching in Regina, Saskatchewan and Brandon, Manitoba, received his PhD in Canadian history from the University of Alberta.

Following the November 1982 death of Brandon—Souris Member of Parliament Walter Dinsdale, Clark became the Progressive Conservative party candidate for the riding in a by-election in May 1983. Clark won the seat and was re-elected in the 1984 and 1988 federal elections.

Clark left federal politics and did not campaign in the 1993 federal election after serving for part of the 32nd Canadian Parliament, and for full terms in the 33rd and 34th Parliaments.

Clark died at the age of 71, following a fall from a horse at Lake Metigoshe.

== Electoral history ==
1988 Canadian federal election: Brandon—Souris
Party	Candidate	Votes	%	±%
Progressive Conservative	Lee Clark	17,372	46.8	-5.4
Liberal	David Campbell	11,404	30.7	+16.1
New Democratic	Dave Serle	5,018	13.5	-2.1
Reform	Henry Carroll	1,578	4.2	–
Christian Heritage	Abe Neufeld	1,324	3.6	–
Confederation of Regions	Richard Rattai	333	0.9	-16.6
Independent	Tabitha Y. Singha	108	0.3	–
Total valid votes		37,137	100.0	

1984 Canadian federal election: Brandon—Souris
Party	Candidate	Votes	%	±%
Progressive Conservative	Lee Clark	18,813	52.2	-10.0
Confederation of Regions	Dennis Heeney	6,322	17.5	–
New Democratic	Jake Janzen	5,631	15.6	-4.9
Liberal	David Campbell	5,278	14.6	-2.7
Total valid votes		36,044	100.0	

Canadian federal by-election, 24 May 1983
Party	Candidate	Votes	%	±%
On Mr. Dinsdale's death, 20 November 1982
Progressive Conservative	Lee Clark	19,330	62.2	+15.3
New Democratic	Bill Moore	6,381	20.5	-4.2
Liberal	Joe Mullally	5,369	17.3	-10.9
Total valid votes		31,080	100.0	
