= Walter Dinsdale =

Canadian politician

The Honourable Walter Dinsdale PC DFC
- Official 1980 portrait

Minister of Northern Affairs and National Resources
- In office 11 October 1960 – 21 April 1963
- Prime Minister: John Diefenbaker
- Preceded by: Alvin Hamilton
- Succeeded by: Arthur Laing

Minister of Mines and Technical Surveys
- Acting; 10 October 1961 – 27 December 1961
- Prime Minister: John Diefenbaker
- Preceded by: Paul Comtois
- Succeeded by: Jacques Flynn

Member of Parliament for Brandon—Souris
- In office 10 August 1953 – 20 November 1982
- Preceded by: Riding created
- Succeeded by: Lee Clark

Member of Parliament for Brandon
- In office 25 June 1951 – 9 August 1953
- Preceded by: James Matthews
- Succeeded by: Riding merged

Personal details
- Born: Walter Gilbert Dinsdale; 3 April 1916 Brandon, Manitoba, Canada
- Died: 20 November 1982 (aged 66) Ottawa, Ontario, Canada
- Party: Progressive Conservative
- Spouse: Lenore Gusdal (m. 1947)
- Children: 5
- Education: McMaster University (BA); University of Toronto (MA)
- Profession: Lecturer; social worker; teacher

Walter Gilbert Dinsdale PC DFC (3 April 1916 – 20 November 1982) was a Canadian politician. He served as a Progressive Conservative Member of Parliament from 1951 until his death, and is known for the work he did with people with disabilities.

== Early life ==
Born in Brandon, Manitoba, to Minnie (née Lang) and George Dinsdale, he graduated from Brandon College and received a Bachelor of Arts degree in 1937 from McMaster University. He received a Master of Arts degree from the University of Toronto in 1951.

== Career ==
Before entering politics, Dinsdale was a social worker with the Salvation Army, and from 1946 to 1951 served as the director of adult education and assistant professor of social services at Brandon College.

Dinsdale enlisted in the Royal Canadian Air Force on 21 November 1941, to fight in the Second World War. He trained at CFB Borden in Belleville and at No. 2 Service Flying Training School in Ottawa, graduating in 1942. He arrived in Europe on 29 December 1942 and ended his military career in 1945 at the end of the Second World War.

He was awarded the Distinguished Flying Cross during World War II for his service as a de Havilland Mosquito night-fighter pilot with the Royal Canadian Air Force, having destroyed four enemy aircraft, including the first Mistel composite "piggyback" aircraft. He also downed V-1 flying bombs, using the wing-tip of the de Havilland Mosquito to knock them off-course.

== Political career ==
Dinsdale was a Progressive Conservative Member of Parliament (MP) from 1951 until his death in 1982, being first elected in a 1951 by-election with an upset victory to take a seat previously held by the Liberals.

Dinsdale was originally hesitant about running in the by-election, and was fired by Brandon College soon after his nomination. Dinsdale won 56.9% of the vote in that by-election.

During his tenure in the House of Commons of Canada, he represented the riding of Brandon for one year in 1951 until it was merged with the neighbouring riding of Souris to form Brandon—Souris. He held Brandon-Souris from 1952 until his death in 1982, winning 11 consecutive election victories. At the time of his death he was the Dean of the House - the longest-serving Member of Parliament.

During his period as MP, he was the parliamentary assistant to the Minister of Veterans Affairs in 1957, and parliamentary secretary to the same minister in 1960. He then joined the Cabinet of John Diefenbaker as Minister of Northern Affairs and National Resources from 1960 to 1963. He was also acting Minister of Mines and Technical Surveys for a few months in 1961.

In 1963, while serving as Minister of Northern Affairs and National Resources he chaired the "Resources for Tomorrow" conference, which led to the establishment of a Department of the Environment. Dinsdale worked tirelessly for many causes, including First Nations, international human rights, immigrant Canadians and most notably disabled persons. He was vice-chair of the Special Committee on the Disabled, whose work led to many improvements in services for disabled Canadians, and worked with many international governments and organizations to improve the lives of disabled people everywhere, and in 1981 was Canada's delegate to the United Nations for the International Year of Disabled Persons.

== Honours ==
The Walter Dinsdale Award, which recognizes outstanding achievement in developing technologies that improve the lives of disabled people, is named in his honour.

Dinsdale was awarded a Doctor of Laws degree by Brandon University and a Doctor of Humanities degree from Richmond College in Toronto for his works with disabled people.

== Death ==
He died from kidney failure in 1982, after suffering a stroke about two months before his death. He is buried in Brandon. Following his death, he was eulogized in the House of Commons of Canada, following which the house was adjourned for the day in tribute.

== Family ==
Walter married Lenore Gusdal, and had 5 children: Gunnar, Greg, Elizabeth, Eric and Rolf. His son Rolf ran as a Liberal Party of Canada candidate in a federal by-election in Brandon—Souris in 2013, losing narrowly to Larry Maguire.

== Electoral record ==
Note: This list is incomplete.

1979 Canadian federal election: Brandon—Souris
Party	Candidate	Votes	%
Progressive Conservative	Walter Dinsdale	19,108	52.67
New Democratic	David Serle	8,949	24.67
Liberal	Vaughn Ramsay	7,918	21.83
Social Credit	John W. Gross	302	0.83
Total valid votes		36,277	100.00
Rejected, unmarked and declined ballots		75	
Turnout		36,352	74.48
Electors on the lists		48,808	

== Archives ==
There is a Walter Gilbert Dinsdale fonds at Library and Archives Canada.
