= Western Canadian Wheat Growers Association =

Private lobbying company based in Saskatoon, Canada

The Western Canadian Wheat Growers Association (WCWGA) is a private lobbying company located in Saskatoon, Canada. Founded in 1970 as the Palliser Wheat Growers Association, the WCWGA was for many years an opponent of the Canadian Wheat Board's marketing status and advocated for open market competition in sales of wheat and barley.

The Association's president from 1995 to 1999 was Larry Maguire, who was MLA for Arthur-Virden in the Manitoba Legislature from 1999 until 2013 when he was elected Member of Parliament for Brandon-Souris.
