= Brandon—Souris =

Federal electoral district in Manitoba, Canada

Coordinates: 49.724°N 100.020°W

Manitoba electoral district
- Interactive map of riding boundaries from the 2025 federal election. Points indicate the city of Brandon and the town of Souris.

Federal electoral district
- Legislature: House of Commons
MP
Grant Jackson
Conservative
- District created: 1952
- First contested: 1953
- Last contested: 2025
- District webpage: profile, map

Demographics
- Population (2016): 88,170
- Electors (2015): 59,459
- Area (km²): 17,842.36
- Pop. density (per km²): 4.9
- Census division(s): Division No. 4, Division No. 5, Division No. 6, Division No. 7,
- Census subdivision(s): Brandon, Cornwallis, Killarney - Turtle Mountain, Virden, North Cypress-Langford (part), Wallace-Woodworth (part), Souris-Glenwood, Pembina, Boissevain-Morton, Louise

Brandon—Souris is a federal electoral district in Manitoba, Canada, that has been represented in the House of Commons of Canada since 1953.

== Demographics ==
Panethnic groups in Brandon—Souris (2011−2021)
Panethnic group	2021		2016		2011	
Panethnic group	Pop.	%	Pop.	%	Pop.	%
European (Note: Statistic includes all persons that did not make up part of a visible minority or an indigenous identity.)	63,385	73.96%	66,660	79.25%	67,425	84.26%
Indigenous	10,235	11.94%	8,760	10.41%	6,805	8.5%
African	3,050	3.56%	1,140	1.36%	590	0.74%
South Asian	2,705	3.16%	1,495	1.78%	545	0.68%
Latin American	2,230	2.6%	2,435	2.89%	2,005	2.51%
Southeast Asian (Note: Statistic includes total responses of "Filipino" and "Southeast Asian" under visible minority section on census.)	1,885	2.2%	1,045	1.24%	745	0.93%
East Asian (Note: Statistic includes total responses of "Chinese", "Korean", and "Japanese" under visible minority section on census.)	1,740	2.03%	2,120	2.52%	1,635	2.04%
Middle Eastern (Note: Statistic includes total responses of "West Asian" and "Arab" under visible minority section on census.)	145	0.17%	165	0.2%	135	0.17%
Other/multiracial (Note: Statistic includes total responses of "Visible minority, n.i.e." and "Multiple visible minorities" under visible minority section on census.)	330	0.39%	300	0.36%	145	0.18%
Total responses	85,700	95.42%	84,115	95.4%	80,020	95.47%
Total population	89,812	100%	88,170	100%	83,814	100%
Notes: Totals greater than 100% due to multiple origin responses. Demographics based on 2012 Canadian federal electoral redistribution riding boundaries.

According to the 2011 Canadian census

Languages: 85.8% English, 4.3% German, 2.3% Spanish, 1.7% French, 1.4% Chinese
Religions: 67.4% Christian (23.3% United Church, 16.6% Catholic, 12.5% "Other Christian", 6.1% Anglican, 2.1% Presbyterian, 1.8% Lutheran, 1.6% Baptist), 30.5% None.
Median income: $30,394 (2010)
Average income: $36,827 (2010)

== Geography ==
The district is in the southwestern corner of the province of Manitoba. It is bordered by the electoral district of Dauphin—Swan River—Neepawa to the north, the electoral district of Portage—Lisgar to the east, the Canada–United States border in North Dakota to the south, and the province of Saskatchewan to the west.

It includes the communities of Brandon, Cornwallis, Virden, Killarney, Souris and North Cypress.

The district includes the Brandon Municipal Airport, which is an exclave of Brandon in the Rural Municipality of Elton. It is the only currently extant non-contiguous federal electoral district in Canada.

== History ==
The electoral district was created in 1952 from the former districts of Brandon and Souris. It has been held by a centre-right party for all but one term of its existence. This tradition was broken in 1993 when massive vote-splitting between the Progressive Conservatives and Reform allowed the Liberals to sneak up the middle and take the riding. However, the seat reverted to form in 1997 when the PCs reclaimed it. The PCs and their successors, the modern Conservatives, have held the seat ever since. While Brandon has some Liberal and NDP support, it is not enough to overcome the conservative bent in the more rural areas of the riding.

This riding lost territory to Dauphin—Swan River—Neepawa and gained territory from Portage—Lisgar during the 2012 electoral redistribution.

=== Members of Parliament ===
This riding has elected the following members of Parliament:

Parliament	Years	Member	Party
Brandon—Souris; Riding created from Brandon and Souris
22nd	1953–1957	Walter Dinsdale	Progressive Conservative
23rd	1957–1958	Walter Dinsdale	Progressive Conservative
24th	1958–1962	Walter Dinsdale	Progressive Conservative
25th	1962–1963	Walter Dinsdale	Progressive Conservative
26th	1963–1965	Walter Dinsdale	Progressive Conservative
27th	1965–1968	Walter Dinsdale	Progressive Conservative
28th	1968–1972	Walter Dinsdale	Progressive Conservative
29th	1972–1974	Walter Dinsdale	Progressive Conservative
30th	1974–1979	Walter Dinsdale	Progressive Conservative
31st	1979–1980	Walter Dinsdale	Progressive Conservative
32nd	1980–1982	Walter Dinsdale	Progressive Conservative
32nd	1983–1984	Lee Clark	Progressive Conservative
33rd	1984–1988	Lee Clark	Progressive Conservative
34th	1988–1993	Lee Clark	Progressive Conservative
35th	1993–1997	Glen McKinnon	Liberal
36th	1997–2000	Rick Borotsik	Progressive Conservative
37th	2000–2003	Rick Borotsik	Progressive Conservative
37th	2003–2004	Rick Borotsik	Conservative
38th	2004–2006	Merv Tweed	Conservative
39th	2006–2008	Merv Tweed	Conservative
40th	2008–2011	Merv Tweed	Conservative
41st	2011–2013	Merv Tweed	Conservative
41st	2013–2015	Larry Maguire	Conservative
42nd	2015–2019	Larry Maguire	Conservative
43rd	2019–2021	Larry Maguire	Conservative
44th	2021–2025	Larry Maguire	Conservative
45th	2025–present	Grant Jackson	Conservative

== Election results ==
Graph of election results in Brandon—Souris (minor parties that never got 2% of the vote or didn't run consistently are omitted) View source data.

2025 Canadian federal election
Party	Candidate	Votes	%	±%	Expenditures
Conservative	Grant Jackson	28,624	62.19	+2.82	
Liberal	Ghazanfar Ali Tarar	10,766	23.39	+11.45	
New Democratic	Quentin Robinson	6,637	14.42	−5.97	
Total valid votes/expense limit		46,027	99.19		
Total rejected ballots		376	0.81		
Turnout		46,403	69.56		
Eligible voters		66,710			
Conservative notional hold		Swing		−4.32	
Source: Elections Canada
Note: number of eligible voters does not include voting day registrations.

2021 federal election redistributed results
Party	Vote	%
Conservative	23,659	59.37
New Democratic	8,126	20.39
Liberal	4,759	11.94
People's	3,277	8.22
Green	9	0.02
Others	19	0.05

2021 Canadian federal election
Party	Candidate	Votes	%	±%	Expenditures
Conservative	Larry Maguire	22,733	59.57	-3.89	$54,605.35
New Democratic	Whitney Hodgins	7,838	20.54	+6.46	$2,209.23
Liberal	Linda Branconnier	4,608	12.07	+0.01	$3,827.05
People's	Tylor Baer	2,981	7.81	+6.13	$790.60
Total valid votes/expense limit		38,162	–	–	$112,170.52
Total rejected ballots					
Turnout			61.50	-3.85	
Eligible voters		62,053			
Conservative hold		Swing		-5.17	
Source: Elections Canada

2019 Canadian federal election
Party	Candidate	Votes	%	±%	Expenditures
Conservative	Larry Maguire	26,148	63.46	+13.19	$76,622.34
New Democratic	Ashley Duguay	5,805	14.09	+7.82	$1,382.10
Liberal	Terry Hayward	4,972	12.07	-25.24	$17,298.99
Green	Bill Tiessen	2,984	7.24	+1.07	$2,661.43
People's	Robin Lussier	691	1.68	–	none listed
Christian Heritage	Rebecca Hein	280	0.68	–	none listed
Independent	Vanessa Hamilton	219	0.53	–	$0.00
Independent	Robert Eastcott	107	0.26	–	$0.00
Total valid votes/expense limit		41,206	99.46		
Total rejected ballots		224	0.54		
Turnout		41,430	65.35		
Eligible voters		63,401			
Conservative hold		Swing		+2.70	
Source: Elections Canada

2015 Canadian federal election
Party	Candidate	Votes	%	±%	Expenditures
Conservative	Larry Maguire	20,666	50.27	-13.55	$199,886.51
Liberal	Jodi Wyman	15,338	37.31	+31.57	$49,711.29
New Democratic	Melissa Joy Wastasecoot	2,576	6.27	-18.37	$5,845.76
Green	David Neufeld	2,526	6.15	-0.40	$15,550.33
Total valid votes/expense limit		41,106	100.00		$212,589.96
Total rejected ballots		150	0.36	–	
Turnout		41,256	68.27	–	
Eligible voters		60,427			
Conservative hold		Swing		-22.56	
Source: Elections Canada

2011 federal election redistributed results
Party	Vote	%
Conservative	21,253	63.83
New Democratic	8,202	24.63
Green	1,913	5.75
Liberal	1,912	5.74
Others	18	0.05

Canadian federal by-election, November 25, 2013
Party	Candidate	Votes	%	±%	Expenditures
Conservative	Larry Maguire	12,205	44.16	−19.57	$ 89,503.81
Liberal	Rolf Dinsdale	11,816	42.75	+37.39	76,203.47
New Democratic	Cory Szczepanski	1,996	7.22	−17.96	22,981.64
Green	David Neufeld	1,349	4.88	−0.85	7,502.04
Libertarian	Frank Godon	271	0.98	–	2,404.04
Total valid votes/expense limit		27,637	100.0	–	$ 94,534.60
Total rejected ballots		106	0.38	−0.01	
Turnout		27,743	44.81	−12.83	
Eligible voters		61,910			
Conservative hold		Swing		−28.48	
By-election due to the resignation of Merv Tweed.
Source(s) "November 25, 2013 By-elections". Elections Canada. November 26, 2013.} "November 25, 2013 By-election – Financial Reports".

2011 Canadian federal election
Party	Candidate	Votes	%	±%	Expenditures
Conservative	Merv Tweed	22,386	63.73	+6.67	$42,483
New Democratic	Jean Luc Bouché	8,845	25.18	+7.52	$11,846
Green	Dave Barnes	2,012	5.73	-10.06	$10,620
Liberal	Wes Penner	1,882	5.36	-2.92	$15,300
Total valid votes/expense limit		35,125	100.0		$ 88,412.19
Total rejected ballots		139	0.39	+0.07	
Turnout		35,264	57.54	+1.58	
Eligible voters		61,289	–	–	
Conservative hold		Swing		-0.42	

2008 Canadian federal election
Party	Candidate	Votes	%	±%	Expenditures
Conservative	Merv Tweed	19,558	57.06	+2.63	$40,902
New Democratic	Jean Luc Bouché	6,055	17.67	-2.57	$16,762
Green	Dave Barnes	5,410	15.78	+11.20	$39,823
Liberal	Martha Jo Willard	2,836	8.27	-9.73	$12,178
Christian Heritage	Jerome Dondo	292	0.85	+0.07	$728
Communist	Lisa Gallagher	124	0.36	+0.04	$622
Total valid votes/expense limit		34,275	100.0		$ 85,829
Total rejected ballots		112	0.33	-0.04	
Turnout		34,387	55.96	-4.36	
Eligible voters		61,449	–	–	
Conservative hold		Swing		+2.60	

2006 Canadian federal election
Party	Candidate	Votes	%	±%	Expenditures
Conservative	(x)Merv Tweed	20,247	54.43	+2.70	$51,606
New Democratic	Bob Senff	7,528	20.24	+1.09	$7,255
Liberal	Murray Downing	6,696	18.00	-6.21	$20,605
Green	Brad Bird	1,707	4.59	+1.00	$15.50
Independent	Mike Volek	611	1.64	–	$4,238
Christian Heritage	Colin Atkins	290	0.78	-0.22	$1,380
Communist	Lisa Gallagher	120	0.32	-0.01	$295
Total valid votes/expense limit		37,119	100.0		–
Total rejected ballots		138	0.37	-0.18	
Turnout		37,337	60.32	+4.07	
Eligible voters		61,903	–	–	
Conservative hold		Swing		+0.81	

2004 Canadian federal election
Party	Candidate	Votes	%	±%	Expenditures
Conservative	Merv Tweed	18,209	51.72	-17.64	$54,647
Liberal	Murray Downing	8,522	24.21	+6.83	$26,903
New Democratic	Mike Abbey	6,740	19.15	+7.05	$13,512
Green	David Kattenburg	1,264	3.59	–	$1,322
Christian Heritage	Colin Atkins	351	1.00		$683
Communist	Lisa Gallagher	118	0.34		$665
Total valid votes		35,204	100.0		–
Total rejected ballots		194	0.55		
Turnout		35,398	56.24	-8.96	
Eligible voters		62,938	–	–	
Conservative notional hold		Swing		+12.23	

2000 Canadian federal election
Party	Candidate	Votes	%	±%	Expenditures
Progressive Conservative	Rick Borotsik	13,707	37.41	+1.82	$43,992.66
Alliance	Gary Nestibo	11,678	31.87	−0.13	$59,234.19
Liberal	Dick Scott	6,544	17.86	+0.13	$42,860.78
New Democratic	Errol Black	4,518	12.33	−1.09	$13,475.28
Communist	Lisa Gallagher	102	0.28		$383.70
Christian Heritage	Colin Atkins	94	0.26	−0.36	$1,000.00
Total valid votes		36,643	100.00		
Total rejected ballots		116			
Turnout		36,759	67.04	+0.16	
Electors on the lists		54,829			
Sources: Official Results, Elections Canada and Financial Returns, Elections Canada.

^ Conservative change is from combined Canadian Alliance and Progressive Conservative. Percent change based on redistributed results.

1997 Canadian federal election
Party	Candidate	Votes	%	±%	Expenditures
Progressive Conservative	Rick Borotsik	13,216	35.59	+13.18	$51,629
Reform	Ed Agnew	11,883	32.00	+1.63	$52,341
Liberal	Glen McKinnon	6,583	17.73	-15.27	$33,249
New Democratic	Jennifer Howard	4,983	13.42	+1.56	$12,213
Independent	Geoff Gorf Borden	244	0.66		$19
Christian Heritage	Colin Atkins	229	0.62	-0.3	$34
Total valid votes		37,138	100.00		
Total rejected ballots		135			
Turnout		37,273	66.88		
Electors on the lists		55,735			
Sources: Official Results, Elections Canada and Financial Returns, Elections Canada.

1993 Canadian federal election
Party	Candidate	Votes	%	±%	Expenditures
Liberal	Glen McKinnon	12,130	33.00	+2.3	$34,664
Reform	Edward Agnew	11,163	30.37	+26.17	$32,210
Progressive Conservative	Larry Maguire	8,236	22.41	-24.39	$52,740
New Democratic	Ross C. Martin	4,359	11.86	-1.9	$13,827
Christian Heritage	Abe Neufeld	339	0.92	-2.68	$2,184
National	Eldon Obach	336	0.91	+0.91	$5,524
Natural Law	Robert Roberts	112	0.30		$0
Canada Party	George H. Armstrong	82	0.22		$0
Total valid votes		36,757	100.00		
Total rejected ballots		128			
Turnout		36,885	68.74		
Electors on lists		53,659			
Source: Thirty-fifth General Election, 1993: Official Voting Results, Published by the Chief Electoral Officer of Canada. Financial figures taken from official contributions and expenses provided by Elections Canada.

1988 Canadian federal election
Party	Candidate	Votes	%	±%
Progressive Conservative	Lee Clark	17,372	46.8	-5.4
Liberal	David Campbell	11,404	30.7	+16.1
New Democratic	Dave Serle	5,018	13.5	-2.1
Reform	Henry Carroll	1,578	4.2	–
Christian Heritage	Abe Neufeld	1,324	3.6	–
Confederation of Regions	Richard Rattai	333	0.9	-16.6
Independent	Tabitha Y. Singha	108	0.3	–
Total valid votes		37,137	100.0	

1984 Canadian federal election
Party	Candidate	Votes	%	±%
Progressive Conservative	Lee Clark	18,813	52.2	-10.0
Confederation of Regions	Dennis Heeney	6,322	17.5	–
New Democratic	Jake Janzen	5,631	15.6	-4.9
Liberal	David Campbell	5,278	14.6	-2.7
Total valid votes		36,044	100.0	

Canadian federal by-election, 24 May 1983
Party	Candidate	Votes	%	±%
On Mr. Dinsdale's death, 20 November 1982
Progressive Conservative	Lee Clark	19,330	62.2	+15.3
New Democratic	Bill Moore	6,381	20.5	-4.2
Liberal	Joe Mullally	5,369	17.3	-10.9
Total valid votes		31,080	100.0	

1980 Canadian federal election: Brandon—Souris
Party	Candidate	Votes	%	±%
Progressive Conservative	Walter Gilbert Dinsdale	16,098	46.9	-5.8
Liberal	Joe Mullally	9,661	28.1	+6.3
New Democratic	David Serle	8,509	24.8	+0.1
Marxist–Leninist	Marnie Frain	76	0.2	–
Total valid votes		34,344	100.0	
lop.parl.ca

1979 Canadian federal election
Party	Candidate	Votes	%
Progressive Conservative	Walter Dinsdale	19,108	52.67
New Democratic	David Serle	8,949	24.67
Liberal	Vaughn Ramsay	7,918	21.83
Social Credit	John W. Gross	302	0.83
Total valid votes		36,277	100.00
Rejected, unmarked and declined ballots		75	
Turnout		36,352	74.48
Electors on the lists		48,808	

1974 Canadian federal election: Brandon—Souris
Party	Candidate	Votes	%	±%
Progressive Conservative	Walter Gilbert Dinsdale	16,624	57.8	-2.8
Liberal	John W. McRae	5,988	20.8	+0.6
New Democratic	Cam Connor	5,616	19.5	+0.9
Social Credit	John W. Gross	540	1.9	–
Total valid votes		28,768	100.0	

1972 Canadian federal election: Brandon—Souris
Party	Candidate	Votes	%	±%
Progressive Conservative	Walter Gilbert Dinsdale	17,923	60.6	+8.8
Liberal	Gary Belecki	5,968	20.2	-14.1
New Democratic	Kenneth John Singleton	5,501	18.6	+4.7
Independent	William Lea	190	0.6	
Total valid votes		29,582	100.0	

1968 Canadian federal election: Brandon—Souris
Party	Candidate	Votes	%	±%
Progressive Conservative	Walter Gilbert Dinsdale	15,060	51.8	-2.7
Liberal	James R. Bates	9,963	34.3	+7.9
New Democratic	Harold Van Mulligen	4,031	13.9	+3.7
Total valid votes		29,054	100.0	

1965 Canadian federal election: Brandon—Souris
Party	Candidate	Votes	%	±%
Progressive Conservative	Walter Gilbert Dinsdale	15,554	54.6	-5.9
Liberal	Harry George	7,522	26.4	+3.0
New Democratic	Harold E. Weitman	2,913	10.2	+5.2
Social Credit	A.W. Bassingthwaighte	2,518	8.8	-2.2
Total valid votes		28,507	100.0	

1962 Canadian federal election: Brandon—Souris
Party	Candidate	Votes	%	±%
Progressive Conservative	Walter Gilbert Dinsdale	17,813	60.1	-13.9
Liberal	John Cameron Brown	6,143	20.7	+3.1
Social Credit	Reginald Pearen	4,229	14.3	+11.1
New Democratic	Leslie Victor Robson	1,438	4.9	-0.3
Total valid votes		29,623	100.0	

1958 Canadian federal election: Brandon—Souris
Party	Candidate	Votes	%	±%
Progressive Conservative	Walter Gilbert Dinsdale	22,185	74.0	+12.4
Liberal	Kendric Hambly Williams	5,303	17.7	-3.0
Co-operative Commonwealth	Hans Fries	1,552	5.2	+1.1
Social Credit	Walter Robert Jones	946	3.2	-17.5
Total valid votes		29,986	100.0	

1957 Canadian federal election: Brandon—Souris
Party	Candidate	Votes	%	±%
Progressive Conservative	Walter Gilbert Dinsdale	17,389	61.6	+3.5
Liberal	Joseph Francis O'Sullivan	5,831	20.7	-14.6
Social Credit	Walter Duncan Taylor	3,866	13.7	–
Co-operative Commonwealth	Hans Fries	1,145	4.1	-1.3
Total valid votes		28,231	100.0	

1953 Canadian federal election: Brandon—Souris
Party	Candidate	Votes	%
Progressive Conservative	Walter Gilbert Dinsdale	13,915	58.0
Liberal	James Albert Creighton	8,456	35.3
Co-operative Commonwealth	Baden-Powell Hathaway	1,277	5.3
Labor–Progressive	Dorothy Jessie Johnson	323	1.3
Total valid votes		23,971	100.0

== See also ==
- List of Canadian electoral districts
- Historical federal electoral districts of Canada
