= Glen McKinnon =

Canadian politician

Glen McKinnon (born 16 December 1937) is a Canadian educator and politician from Manitoba. He represented the federal electoral district of Brandon—Souris in the House of Commons of Canada during the 35th Canadian Parliament, from 1993 to 1997, as a member of the Liberal Party. He was elected in the 1993 Canadian federal election, then fell into third place behind Progressive Conservative candidate Rick Borotsik and Reform candidate Edward Agnew in the 1997 federal election. He previously ran as a Manitoba Liberal candidate in the district of Arthur-Virden in the 1990 provincial election, coming second to PC incumbent Jim Downey.

Born in Carberry, Manitoba, McKinnon resides in Virden, Manitoba. He was employed at Virden Collegiate Institute for several years, serving as principal, football coach, and biology teacher. He and his wife Karen have three daughters.

== Electoral history ==
1997 Canadian federal election: Brandon—Souris
Party	Candidate	Votes	%	±%	Expenditures
Progressive Conservative	Rick Borotsik	13,216	35.59	+13.18	$51,629
Reform	Ed Agnew	11,883	32.00	+1.63	$52,341
Liberal	Glen McKinnon	6,583	17.73	-15.27	$33,249
New Democratic	Jennifer Howard	4,983	13.42	+1.56	$12,213
Independent	Geoff Gorf Borden	244	0.66		$19
Christian Heritage	Colin Atkins	229	0.62	-0.3	$34
Total valid votes		37,138	100.00		
Total rejected ballots		135			
Turnout		37,273	66.88		
Electors on the lists		55,735			
Sources: Official Results, Elections Canada and Financial Returns, Elections Canada.

1993 Canadian federal election: Brandon—Souris
Party	Candidate	Votes	%	±%	Expenditures
Liberal	Glen McKinnon	12,130	33.00	+2.3	$34,664
Reform	Edward Agnew	11,163	30.37	+26.17	$32,210
Progressive Conservative	Larry Maguire	8,236	22.41	-24.39	$52,740
New Democratic	Ross C. Martin	4,359	11.86	-1.9	$13,827
Christian Heritage	Abe Neufeld	339	0.92	-2.68	$2,184
National	Eldon Obach	336	0.91	+0.91	$5,524
Natural Law	Robert Roberts	112	0.30		$0
Canada Party	George H. Armstrong	82	0.22		$0
Total valid votes		36,757	100.00		
Total rejected ballots		128			
Turnout		36,885	68.74		
Electors on lists		53,659			
Source: Thirty-fifth General Election, 1993: Official Voting Results, Published by the Chief Electoral Officer of Canada. Financial figures taken from official contributions and expenses provided by Elections Canada.
