= Larry Maguire =

Canadian politician

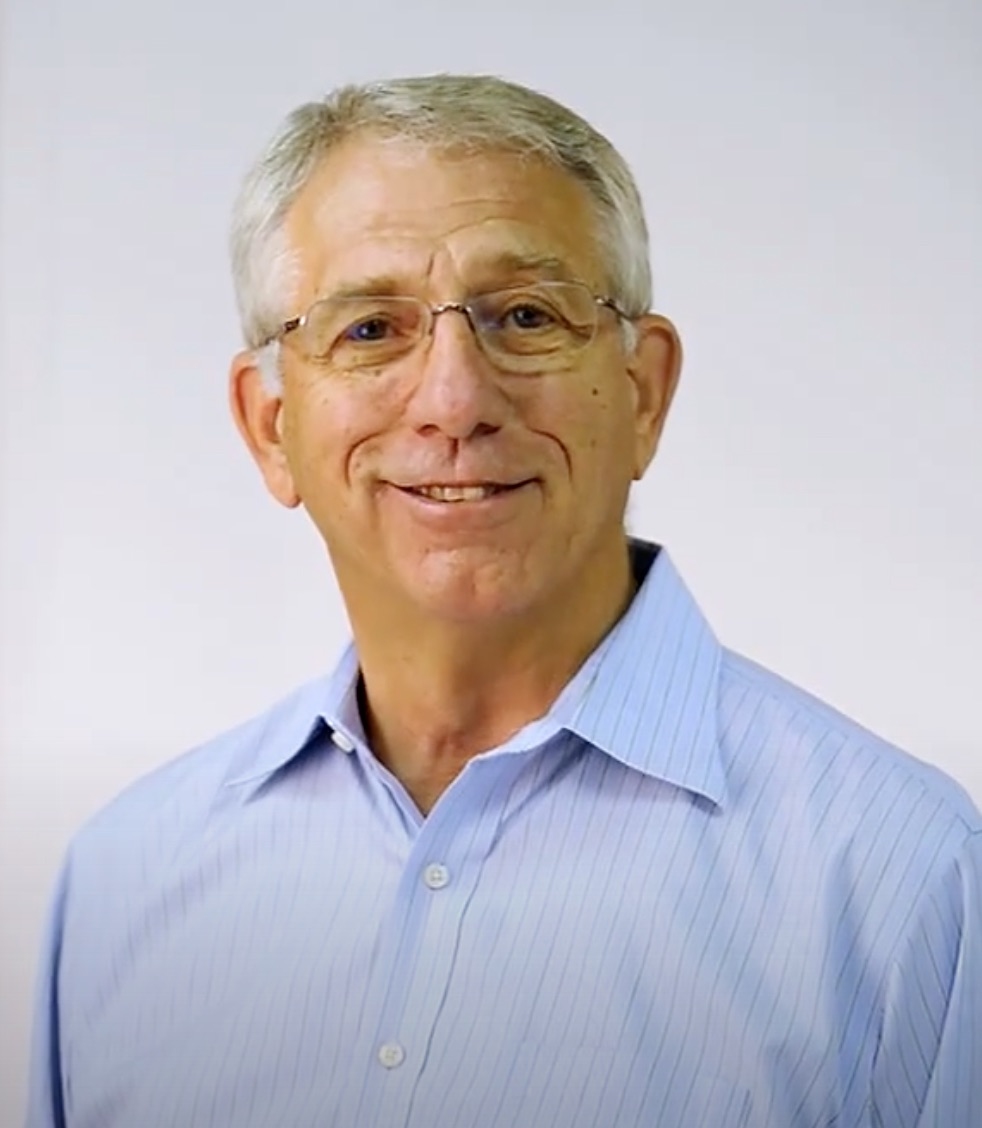
- Maguire in 2013

Member of Parliament for Brandon—Souris
- In office November 25, 2013 – March 23, 2025
- Preceded by: Merv Tweed
- Succeeded by: Grant Jackson

Member of the Legislative Assembly of Manitoba for Arthur-Virden
- In office September 21, 1999 – October 18, 2013
- Preceded by: Jim Downey
- Succeeded by: Doyle Piwniuk

Personal details
- Born: June 1, 1949 (age 76) Souris, Manitoba, Canada
- Party: Progressive Conservative Party of Manitoba; Conservative Party of Canada

Larry Maguire (born June 1, 1949) is a politician and activist farmer in Manitoba, Canada. Formerly a Progressive Conservative MLA in the Legislative Assembly of Manitoba, he was elected to the House of Commons of Canada in a by-election on November 25, 2013. He is a member of the Conservative Party of Canada and sat on the House Standing Committee on Citizenship and Immigration. During the 43rd Canadian Parliament Maguire's Private member's bill, Bill C-208, An Act to amend the Income Tax Act (transfer of small business or family farm or fishing corporation) was adopted. He did not seek re-election in 2025.

== Farming activism ==
Maguire was the owner and operator of Maguire Farms Limited in Elgin with his former spouse, Beryl from 1975 to 2001 when the farmland was sold to neighbours. He was named mid-Canada's Outstanding Young Farmer in 1986, and received a Certificate of Merit from the Manitoba Agricultural and Food Sciences Grads Association in 1990. He was twice elected as the Canadian Wheat Board Advisory Committee's Western Manitoba Representative, serving from 1987 to 1994. He was also chairman of the Agricultural Diversification Alliance (ADA) and a public governor of the Winnipeg Commodity Exchange in this period, and advocated changes to the federal Crow Equity Fund.

Maguire served as president of the Western Canadian Wheat Growers Association from 1995 to 1999. This group opposed the Canadian Wheat Board's single-desk marketing policy, and favoured market competition in wheat and barley. Maguire campaigned for re-election as a Wheat Board advisor in 1994 on an openly anti-monopoly platform, arguing that sellers could receive higher prices through an open market. Others disagreed with his assessment. He was defeated by pro-monopoly candidate Bill Nicholson, 2,728 votes to 1,544.

Maguire supported the anti-monopoly position in a 1997 CWB referendum on barley sales. Farmers rejected this position, with 67% opting to remain with single-desk marketing. Maguire was critical of the referendum question, arguing that it should have included a dual-market option.

In 1998, Maguire was appointed to a council evaluating proposals for the Agri-food Research and Development Initiative. This was a joint project from the federal and provincial governments. Later in the same year, he endorsed anti-monopoly candidates in the first ever election of the Canadian Wheat Board's directors. Pro-monopoly candidates won eight of the ten positions.

== Political career ==
=== Provincial politics ===
Maguire sought the Progressive Conservative Party of Manitoba nomination for Arthur-Virden in April 1999, but lost to rival candidate Gary Nestibo. Nestibo forfeited his nomination following allegations of dubious land sales and vote-stacking, however, and a new nomination meeting was scheduled for August. Maguire finished second on the first ballot, behind Gary's wife Lorna Nestibo, but won on the second count with support from third-place candidate Grant Fotheringham. He was elected to the Legislative Assembly of Manitoba in the 1999 provincial election, as the New Democratic Party won a majority government under Gary Doer. He entered the legislature as a member of the opposition.

Maguire was appointed as the Progressive Conservative critic for the environment, and lobbied for improvements to the provincial Water Rights Act. He represented the PCs in an all-party delegation to Ottawa to advocate increased funding for farmers, and served on an all-party provincial committee on agriculture.

There were rumours that Maguire would campaign to succeed Gary Filmon as Progressive Conservative Party leader in 2000, although nothing came of this. In 2001, he was reassigned as PC critic for rural development. Shortly thereafter, he recommended conducting research into the possibility of selling large quantities of water to the United States. In 2002, he participated in an all-party mission to the United States to oppose that country's farm subsidy policies. He was promoted to finance critic later in the year.

Maguire decided not to open a constituency office following his 1999 election, saying that he could communicate with his constituents by telephone and e-mail. In 2002, he was one of five PC MLAs to support a government motion granting pension, alimony and death benefits to gay and lesbian spouses.

He was re-elected in the 2003 provincial election, as the NDP won an increased majority across the province. After the election, he served as his party's critic for transportation, conservation and intergovernmental affairs. In 2004, he opposed a proposal to introduce photo radar in rural Manitoba. Hugh McFadyen was elected as the Progressive Conservative Party's new leader in 2006, and chose Maguire as his deputy leader and Infrastructure Critic.

Maguire was re-elected in the 2007 provincial election, in which the New Democratic Party won a third consecutive majority government. In September 2007, he was replaced as deputy leader by Myrna Driedger and was appointed Critic for Infrastructure and Transportation, Government Services, and Competitiveness, Training and Trade.

=== Federal politics ===
In June 1993, Maguire upset provincial cabinet minister Jim McCrae to win the Progressive Conservative Party of Canada nomination for Brandon—Souris in the 1993 federal election. The final vote among party members was 1,520 to 1,194. Maguire emphasized farming issues in his nomination speech, and argued that he would be successful in bringing Reform Party supporters back to the Progressive Conservatives.

The Brandon—Souris riding had been held by the PCs since 1953, and had long been considered a safe seat for the party. The party's support base in western Canada collapsed, however, with most of that support transferring to the Reform Party. Maguire was pushed into third place behind the Reform candidate and Liberal Party of Canada Glen McKinnon. He planned to seek the PC nomination again for the 1997 election, but withdrew in favour of Brandon Mayor Rick Borotsik.

On August 12, 2013, Merv Tweed, Borotsik's successor, announced his resignation from the House of Commons. The following week, Maguire announced his intention to seek the Conservative Party of Canada's nomination in the electoral district.

Maguire was re-elected in the 2015 and 2019 Canadian federal elections. In the lead up to the 2019 election, Maguire was one of 27 candidates with a strong environmental track record from across the political spectrum to be endorsed by GreenPAC. GreenPAC is a non-profit, non-partisan organization that works to elect and support environmental leaders. Maguire's endorsement is a recognition of his efforts to protect water and wetlands as an MLA and an MP. This includes securing funding for water management and wetland restoration projects such as the Assiniboine River Basin Initiative.

During the 43rd Canadian Parliament Maguire's Private member's bill, Bill C-208, was adopted. Introduced on February 19, 2020, Bill C-208: An Act to amend the Income Tax Act (transfer of small business or family farm or fishing corporation) applies the capital gains tax and its exemptions, instead of the dividend tax, to inter-generational transfers of corporations classified as small businesses, family farms, and family fishing corporations so that they are taxed at the same rate as they would when selling to a third party. Previously, it was more financially advantageous for an owner to sell their operation to a third-party than to a family member from a taxation perspective.

On March 23, 2025, Maguire announced that he would not run for re-election in the 2025 federal election.

== Electoral record ==
=== Federal elections ===
2021 Canadian federal election: Brandon—Souris
Party	Candidate	Votes	%	±%	Expenditures
Conservative	Larry Maguire	22,733	59.57	-3.89	$54,605.35
New Democratic	Whitney Hodgins	7,838	20.54	+6.46	$2,209.23
Liberal	Linda Branconnier	4,608	12.07	+0.01	$3,827.05
People's	Tylor Baer	2,981	7.81	+6.13	$790.60
Total valid votes/expense limit		38,162	–	–	$112,170.52
Total rejected ballots					
Turnout			61.50	-3.85	
Eligible voters		62,053			
Conservative hold		Swing		-5.17	
Source: Elections Canada

2019 Canadian federal election: Brandon—Souris
Party	Candidate	Votes	%	±%	Expenditures
Conservative	Larry Maguire	26,148	63.46	+13.19	$76,622.34
New Democratic	Ashley Duguay	5,805	14.09	+7.82	$1,382.10
Liberal	Terry Hayward	4,972	12.07	-25.24	$17,298.99
Green	Bill Tiessen	2,984	7.24	+1.07	$2,661.43
People's	Robin Lussier	691	1.68	–	none listed
Christian Heritage	Rebecca Hein	280	0.68	–	none listed
Independent	Vanessa Hamilton	219	0.53	–	$0.00
Independent	Robert Eastcott	107	0.26	–	$0.00
Total valid votes/expense limit		41,206	99.46		
Total rejected ballots		224	0.54		
Turnout		41,430	65.35		
Eligible voters		63,401			
Conservative hold		Swing		+2.70	
Source: Elections Canada

2015 Canadian federal election: Brandon—Souris
Party	Candidate	Votes	%	±%	Expenditures
Conservative	Larry Maguire	20,666	50.27	-13.55	$199,886.51
Liberal	Jodi Wyman	15,338	37.31	+31.57	$49,711.29
New Democratic	Melissa Joy Wastasecoot	2,576	6.27	-18.37	$5,845.76
Green	David Neufeld	2,526	6.15	-0.40	$15,550.33
Total valid votes/expense limit		41,106	100.00		$212,589.96
Total rejected ballots		150	0.36	–	
Turnout		41,256	68.27	–	
Eligible voters		60,427			
Conservative hold		Swing		-22.56	
Source: Elections Canada

Canadian federal by-election, November 25, 2013: Brandon—Souris
Party	Candidate	Votes	%	±%	Expenditures
Conservative	Larry Maguire	12,205	44.16	−19.57	$ 89,503.81
Liberal	Rolf Dinsdale	11,816	42.75	+37.39	76,203.47
New Democratic	Cory Szczepanski	1,996	7.22	−17.96	22,981.64
Green	David Neufeld	1,349	4.88	−0.85	7,502.04
Libertarian	Frank Godon	271	0.98	–	2,404.04
Total valid votes/expense limit		27,637	100.0	–	$ 94,534.60
Total rejected ballots		106	0.38	−0.01	
Turnout		27,743	44.81	−12.83	
Eligible voters		61,910			
Conservative hold		Swing		−28.48	
By-election due to the resignation of Merv Tweed.
Source(s) "November 25, 2013 By-elections". Elections Canada. November 26, 2013.} "November 25, 2013 By-election – Financial Reports".

1993 Canadian federal election: Brandon—Souris
Party	Candidate	Votes	%	±%	Expenditures
Liberal	Glen McKinnon	12,130	33.00	+2.3	$34,664
Reform	Edward Agnew	11,163	30.37	+26.17	$32,210
Progressive Conservative	Larry Maguire	8,236	22.41	-24.39	$52,740
New Democratic	Ross C. Martin	4,359	11.86	-1.9	$13,827
Christian Heritage	Abe Neufeld	339	0.92	-2.68	$2,184
National	Eldon Obach	336	0.91	+0.91	$5,524
Natural Law	Robert Roberts	112	0.30		$0
Canada Party	George H. Armstrong	82	0.22		$0
Total valid votes		36,757	100.00		
Total rejected ballots		128			
Turnout		36,885	68.74		
Electors on lists		53,659			
Source: Thirty-fifth General Election, 1993: Official Voting Results, Published by the Chief Electoral Officer of Canada. Financial figures taken from official contributions and expenses provided by Elections Canada.

=== Provincial elections ===
2011 Manitoba general election: Arthur-Virden
Party	Candidate	Votes	%	±%	Expenditures
Progressive Conservative	Larry Maguire	4,983	65.97	+1.92	$29,215.58
New Democratic	Garry Draper	2,282	30.21	−0.60	$14,391.55
Liberal	Murray Cliff	288	3.81	−1.32	$0.00
Total valid votes		7,553			
Rejected and declined ballots		32			
Turnout		7,585	51.91		
Electors on the lists		14,613			
Progressive Conservative hold		Swing		+1.26	
Source: Elections Manitoba

2007 Manitoba general election: Arthur-Virden
Party	Candidate	Votes	%	±%	Expenditures
Progressive Conservative	Larry Maguire	4,451	64.05	+10.24	$21,019.29
New Democratic	Bob Senff	2,141	30.81	−11.08	$8,729.19
Liberal	Fred Curry	357	5.14	+0.83	$0.00
Total valid votes		6,949	100.00		
Rejected and declined ballots		28			
Turnout		6,977	56.79	−3.61	
Electors on the lists		12,285			

2003 Manitoba general election: Arthur-Virden
Party	Candidate	Votes	%	±%	Expenditures
Progressive Conservative	Larry Maguire	4,135	53.81	+4.56	$16,859.29
New Democratic	Perry Kalynuk	3,219	41.89	+6.10	$12,413.35
Liberal	Vaughn Ramsay	331	4.31	−10.66	$1,630.42
Total valid votes		7,685	100.00		
Rejected and declined ballots		25			
Turnout		7,710	60.40	−4.17	
Electors on the lists		12,765			
Source: http://www.elections.mb.ca/en/Results/38_division_results/38_arthur-virden_summary_results.html

1999 Manitoba general election: Arthur-Virden
Party	Candidate	Votes	%	Expenditures
Progressive Conservative	Larry Maguire	4,215	49.25	$21,631.54
New Democratic	Perry Kalynuk	3,063	35.79	$6,262.00
Liberal	Bob Brigden	1,281	14.97	$9,722.15
Total valid votes		8,559	100.00	
Rejected and declined ballots		66		
Turnout		8,625	64.57	
Electors on the lists		13,358		

=== Other ===
1994 Canadian Wheat Board Election, Western Manitoba Advisor
Candidate	Total votes	% of total votes
Bill Nicholson	2,728	63.86
(x) Larry Maguire	1,544	36.14
Total valid votes	4,272	100.00

Maguire seems to have been elected as the Canadian Wheat Board's Western Manitoba advisor in 1986 and 1990.

All provincial and federal electoral information is taken from Elections Manitoba and Elections Canada. Provincial expenditure entries refer to individual candidate expenses. The 1994 Wheat Board election results are taken from the Winnipeg Free Press, December 3, 2004.

== Footnotes ==
Preceded by.	Western Manitoba Advisor on the Canadian Wheat Board; 1986–1994	Succeeded by Bill Nicholson
