= Arthur-Virden =

Defunct provincial electoral district in Manitoba, Canada

Coordinates: 49.496°N 101.019°W

Manitoba electoral district
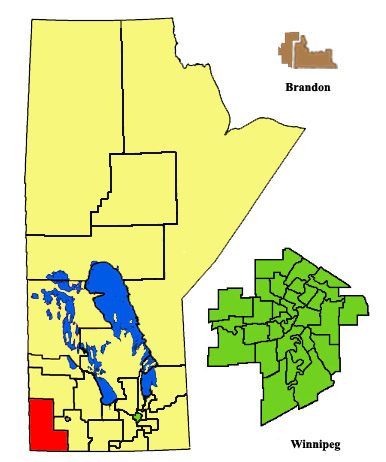
- The 2011-boundaries for Arthur-Virden highlighted in red.

Defunct provincial electoral district
- Legislature: Legislative Assembly of Manitoba
- District created: 1989
- First contested: 1990
- Last contested: 2016

Demographics
- Population (2011): 21,182
- Electors (2014): 13,739
- Area (km²)Canada 2011 Census: 12,200.5
- Census division(s): Division No. 5, Division No. 6, Division No. 15,
- Census subdivision(s): Albert, Archie, Arthur, Birdtail Creek 57, Boissevain, Brenda, Cameron, Canupawakpa Dakota First Nation, Deloraine, Edward, Elkhorn, Hamiota (RM), Hamiota (town), Hartney, Melita, Miniota, Morton, Oak Lake, Pipestone, Sifton, Sioux Valley Dakota Nation, Virden, Wallace, Waskada, Whitewater, Winchester, Woodworth

Arthur-Virden is a former provincial electoral district of Manitoba, Canada. It was created by redistribution in 1989, combining the former constituencies of Arthur and Virden.

Arthur-Virden was located in the southwestern corner of the province. It was bordered to the north by Riding Mountain, to the east by Spruce Woods, to the west by the province of Saskatchewan and to the south by the American state of North Dakota.

Communities in the former riding included Virden, Elkhorn, Oak Lake, Hartney, Deloraine, Melita, Reston, and Boissevain.

In 1999, the average family income was $41,338, and the unemployment rate was 4.80%. The former riding is primarily agrarian, with agriculture accounting for 32% of its industry.

Ten per cent of Arthur-Virden's residents listed German as their ethnic background. The former riding had one of the highest rates of senior citizens in the province, with 19.7% of the total population.

Arthur-Virden, and the two ridings from which it was formed, were Progressive Conservative seats from 1953 to its dissolution in 2018. The northern chunk of Arthur-Virden was absorbed by Riding Mountain, and its southern portion joined with that of Spruce Woods and Midland to form the new riding of Turtle Mountain. Doyle Piwniuk was the last MLA for Arthur-Virden, and was re-elected in the 2019 election as the MLA for the newly-formed Turtle Mountain.

== Members of the Legislative Assembly ==
Assembly	Years	Member	Party
35th	1990-1995	Jim Downey	Progressive Conservative
36th	1995–1999	Jim Downey	Progressive Conservative
37th	1999–2003	Larry Maguire	Progressive Conservative
38th	2003–2007	Larry Maguire	Progressive Conservative
39th	2007–2011	Larry Maguire	Progressive Conservative
40th	2011–2013	Larry Maguire	Progressive Conservative
40th	2014–2016	Doyle Piwniuk	Progressive Conservative
41st	2016–2019	Doyle Piwniuk	Progressive Conservative

== Election results ==
2016 Manitoba general election
Party	Candidate	Votes	%	±%	Expenditures
Progressive Conservative	Doyle Piwniuk	6,006	80.59	+12.39	$20,684.63
Manitoba	Frank Godon	846	11.35	+11.35	$4,340.23
New Democratic	Lorne M. Topolniski	600	8.05	-2.38	$146.90
Total valid votes/expense limit		7,452	100.0		$
Eligible voters		–			
Source: Elections Manitoba

Manitoba provincial by-election, January 28, 2014 Resignation of Larry Maguire
Party	Candidate	Votes	%	±%	Expenditures
Progressive Conservative	Doyle Piwniuk	3,137	68.20	+2.23	15,355.65
Liberal	Floyd Buhler	738	16.04	+12.23	6,463.77
New Democratic	Bob Senff	480	10.43	-19.78	6,318.45
Green	Kate Storey	245	5.33		0.00
Total valid votes		4,600	100.00		
Rejected and declined votes		10			
Turnout		4,610	33.55		
Electors on the lists		13,739			
Progressive Conservative hold		Swing		-5.00	

2011 Manitoba general election
Party	Candidate	Votes	%	±%	Expenditures
Progressive Conservative	Larry Maguire	4,983	65.97	+1.92	$29,215.58
New Democratic	Garry Draper	2,282	30.21	−0.60	$14,391.55
Liberal	Murray Cliff	288	3.81	−1.32	$0.00
Total valid votes		7,553			
Rejected and declined ballots		32			
Turnout		7,585	51.91		
Electors on the lists		14,613			
Progressive Conservative hold		Swing		+1.26	
Source: Elections Manitoba

^ Change not based on redistributed results

2007 Manitoba general election
Party	Candidate	Votes	%	±%	Expenditures
Progressive Conservative	Larry Maguire	4,451	64.05	+10.24	$21,019.29
New Democratic	Bob Senff	2,141	30.81	−11.08	$8,729.19
Liberal	Fred Curry	357	5.14	+0.83	$0.00
Total valid votes		6,949	100.00		
Rejected and declined ballots		28			
Turnout		6,977	56.79	−3.61	
Electors on the lists		12,285			

2003 Manitoba general election
Party	Candidate	Votes	%	±%	Expenditures
Progressive Conservative	Larry Maguire	4,135	53.81	+4.56	$16,859.29
New Democratic	Perry Kalynuk	3,219	41.89	+6.10	$12,413.35
Liberal	Vaughn Ramsay	331	4.31	−10.66	$1,630.42
Total valid votes		7,685	100.00		
Rejected and declined ballots		25			
Turnout		7,710	60.40	−4.17	
Electors on the lists		12,765			
Source: http://www.elections.mb.ca/en/Results/38_division_results/38_arthur-virden_summary_results.html

1999 Manitoba general election
Party	Candidate	Votes	%	Expenditures
Progressive Conservative	Larry Maguire	4,215	49.25	$21,631.54
New Democratic	Perry Kalynuk	3,063	35.79	$6,262.00
Liberal	Bob Brigden	1,281	14.97	$9,722.15
Total valid votes		8,559	100.00	
Rejected and declined ballots		66		
Turnout		8,625	64.57	
Electors on the lists		13,358		

1995 Manitoba general election
Party	Candidate	Votes	%
Progressive Conservative	Jim Downey	5,015	64.36
New Democratic	Ray Cantelo	1,519	19.49
Liberal	Murray Lee	1,258	16.14

1990 Manitoba general election
Party	Candidate	Votes	%
Progressive Conservative	(x) Jim Downey	4,773	59.25
Liberal	Glen McKinnon	2,085	25.88
New Democratic	Goldwyn Jones	1,197	14.86

== Previous boundaries ==
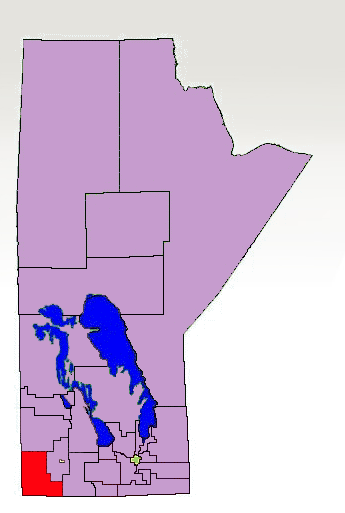
The 1998—2011 boundaries highlighted in red.

== See also ==
- List of Manitoba provincial electoral districts
- Canadian provincial electoral districts
