= Canadian Wheat Board =

Defunct Canadian marketing board

- Commission canadienne du blé
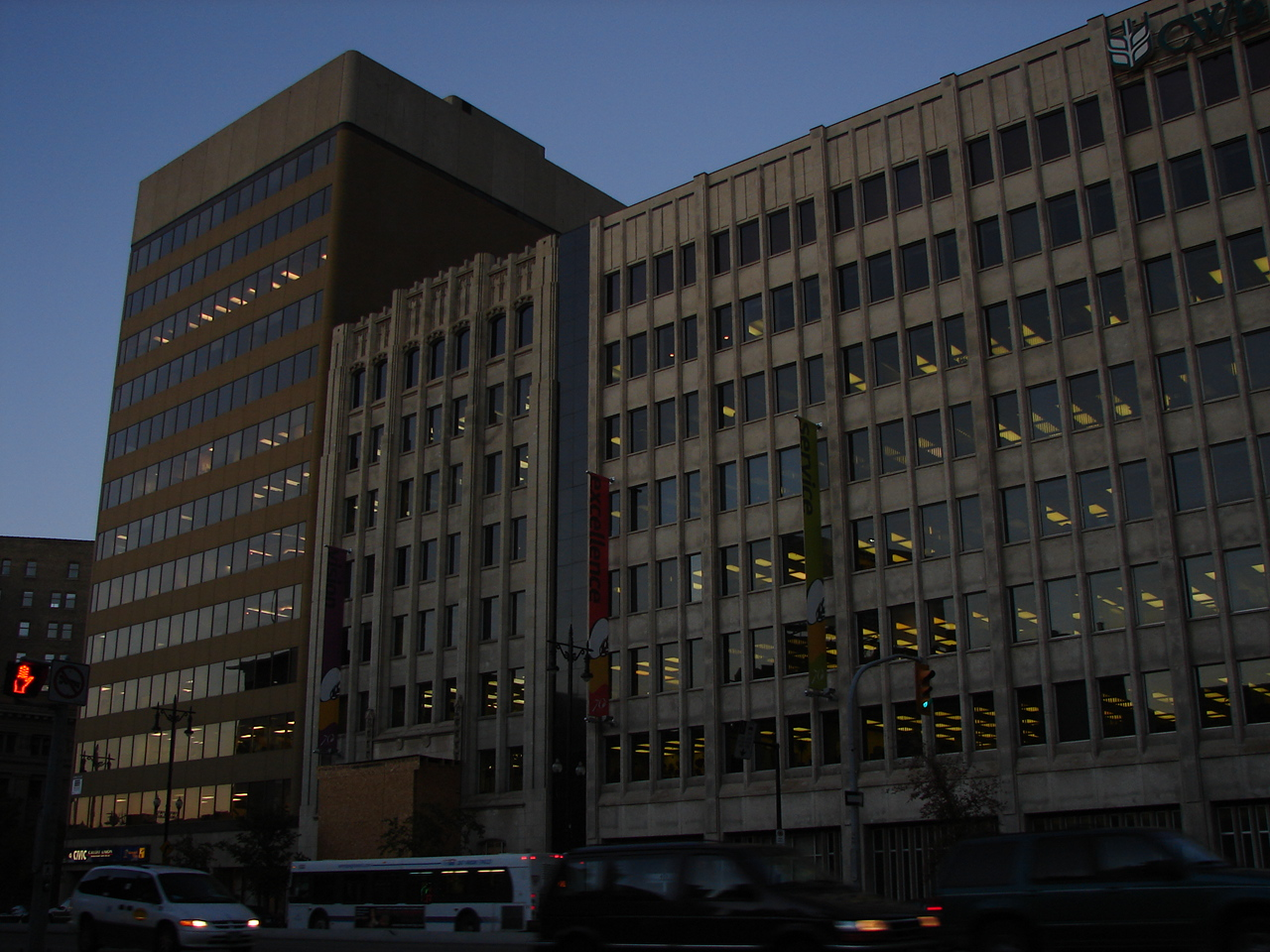
- Canadian Wheat Board Building (on right)

Agency overview
- Formed: 1935
- Dissolved: 2015
- Type: Marketing board
- Jurisdiction: Government of Canada
- Headquarters: Winnipeg, Manitoba
- Parent agency: Agriculture and Agri-Food Canada
- Key document: Canadian Wheat Board Act
- Website: www.cwb.ca

The Canadian Wheat Board (French: Commission canadienne du blé) was a marketing board for wheat and barley in Western Canada. Established by the Parliament of Canada on 5 July 1935, its operation was governed by the Canadian Wheat Board Act as a mandatory producer marketing system for wheat and barley in Alberta, Saskatchewan, Manitoba, and a small part of British Columbia.

This system was historically referred to as "Single Desk" marketing as it was the only channel by which farmers could legally sell their wheat and barley in the CWB jurisdiction.

Amid criticism around this restriction, the Canadian Wheat Board's Single Desk marketing power officially ended on 1 August 2012 as a result of Bill C-18, also known as the Marketing Freedom for Grain Farmers Act. The Canadian Wheat Board changed its name to simply CWB and continued to operate as a grain company, although the bill also set a timeline for the eventual privatization of CWB.

On 15 April 2015, it was announced that a 50.1% majority stake in CWB would be acquired by Global Grain Group, a joint venture of Bunge Limited and the Saudi Agricultural and Livestock Investment Company, for $250 million. CWB was combined with the grain assets of Bunge Canada to form G3 Canada Limited.

== History ==
=== First wheat boards ===
By the early 20th century in Western Canada, grain purchasing, transportation and marketing were controlled by large companies headquartered outside the region, such as the Canadian Pacific Railway and the trading companies that had a significant presence the Winnipeg Grain Exchange. Farmers took note of the success of state-led marketing as it was practised during World War I. The government created a series of boards in and around the war. The Board of Grain Commissioners of 1912 was established for regulation, to supervise grading, etc. By 1915, the government had assumed control of all wheat exports to support the war effort, and by 1917, futures trading on the Winnipeg Exchange was banned.

In 1917, the new Board of Grain Supervisors was given exclusive control over wheat and fixed uniform prices across the country. Soon afterwards, the Board took control of the marketing of other crops as well. Farmers expressed concerns that after the war, prices might decline, leading various agrarian groups to lobby Ottawa to keep the Board in place. In response, the government complied by establishing the Canadian Wheat Board for the 1919 crop exclusively. Under this arrangement, farmers received a guaranteed price for that crop, paid promptly, and subsequently received an additional payment once the Board had finalized the year's sales. This system of guaranteed prices and distributed income was well received and when the Board dissolved in 1920, many farmers dissented. From 1920 to 1923, prices declined. This marked contrast to the stable prices of 1919–1920.

=== Interregnum (1920–1935) ===
After the dissolution of the early board in 1920, farmers turned to the idea of farmer-owned cooperatives. Cooperative grain elevator operators already existed, like United Grain Growers, which had already been started in 1917. In 1923 and 1924 the wheat pools were created to buy Canadian wheat and resell it overseas. The Alberta Wheat Pool, the Saskatchewan Wheat Pool, and Manitoba Pool Elevators emerged as significant players in the industry and supplanted the private traders. However, they did not hedge against falling prices, opting for provincial government guarantees instead. During the price collapse of 1929, they faced financial challenges. The majority of farmers opposed the return of private traders, and the prospect of owning their own marketing companies appeared unattainable. Consequently, the concept of a government marketing board was reintroduced.

=== Revival and flourishing (1935–2000) ===
The Canadian Wheat Board was re-created in 1935 with the aim of controlling grain prices to benefit farmers devastated by the Great Depression. During the Second World War, the authority of the Board was expanded, and it was granted the authority to set statutory maximums on wheat, oats, barley, flax, and corn from December, 1941 until the end of the war. Membership was mandatory for Western Canadian farmers in 1943 via the War Measures Act, with the new objective of supporting the war effort. In April, 1943 the Board was authorized to buy rapeseed and sunflowers as well.

Between 1958 and 1970, the CWB was chaired by William Craig McNamara. In 1965, MacNamara succeeded in persuading Parliament to eliminate the time limit in the Act, establishing a permanent Board. The CWB's authority over interprovincial shipments of feed grains became a matter of public concern during the grains crisis from 1969 to 1972 and was subsequently revoked. Only non-feed wheat and barley remained under the control of the CWB.

=== Anti-GMO stance of the CWB (2004) ===
The Canadian Wheat Board was instrumental in halting the genetically modified (GM) wheat of Monsanto in 2004. Serving as a unified advocate for wheat farmers, the CWB conducted market research that revealed international markets' reluctance towards GM wheat and their intention to reject wheat exports from Canada if GM wheat was sanctioned, citing contamination risks. Additionally, the CWB surveyed wheat farmers and discovered that many were opposed to GM wheat. Subsequently, the CWB presented its research findings and the perspectives of wheat farmers to the government.

=== Late operations ===
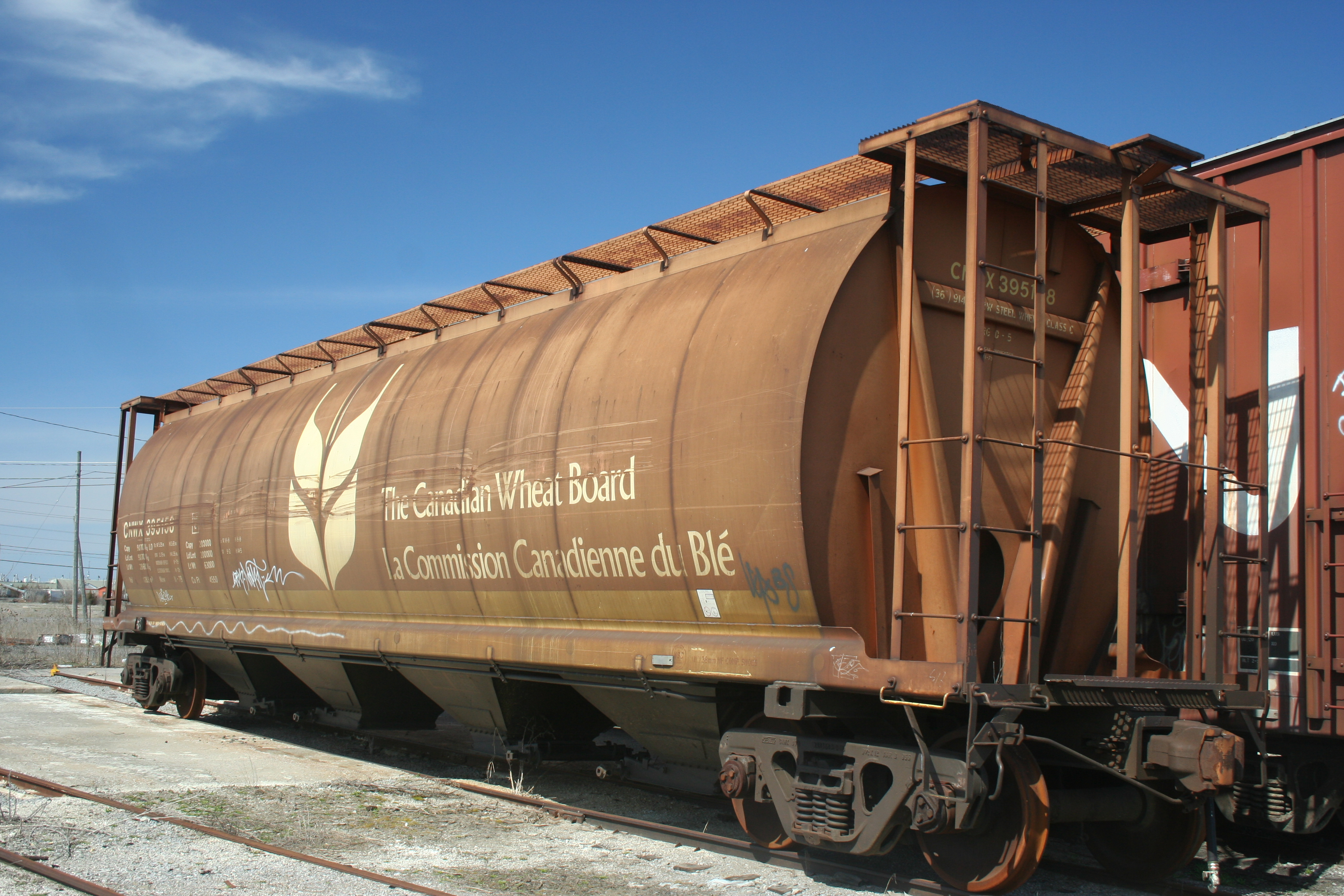
Hopper car with Canadian Wheat Board markings

The farmers delivered their wheat and barley to grain elevators throughout the crop year. The Board acted as a single desk marketer of wheat and barley on behalf of prairie farmers. Upon delivery to an elevator, farmers received an initial payment for their grain from the CWB that represented a percentage of the expected return for that grade from the pool account. After the end of the crop year, on July 31, farmers received an interim payment and a final payment, in addition to their initial payment, ensuring they received 100% of the return from the sale of the grain they delivered, minus all overhead costs of the CWB. The initial payments were guaranteed by the Government of Canada, ensuring farmers received payment even in the event of a deficit in the pool account. These initial payments were intentionally set below expectations for the crop year as a risk management measure to mitigate the possibility of unmet price expectations.

Prior to the December 2011 passage of Bill C-18, An Act to reorganize the Canadian Wheat Board and to make consequential and related amendments to certain Acts, the CWB was governed by a 15-person Board of Directors, of which:

1. Ten of the directors were elected by grain farmers in the western Canadian provinces of Alberta, Saskatchewan, Manitoba and parts of British Columbia;
2. Four of the directors were appointed by Governor in Council on the recommendation of the Minister responsible for the Canadian Wheat Board;
3. One was the President of the CWB, appointed by the Governor in Council, on the recommendation of the Minister responsible for the Canadian Wheat Board with certain restrictions including that the CWB Board of Directors must be consulted on the recommended candidate.

Upon the implementation of Bill C-18, the original elected board was replaced by four directors, and along with the president, they were appointed by the Governor in Council on the recommendation of the Minister of Agriculture.

Until 15 December 2011, compliance with the wheat board was mandatory for most farmers and elevators under threat of punishable by fines and/or imprisonment. Farmers from Eastern Canada and most of British Columbia were not subject to the control of the Canadian Wheat Board and could market all their grain on the open market. The Peace River District in British Columbia was under the jurisdiction of the Canadian Wheat Board. Bill C-18, the Marketing Freedom for Grain Farmers Act, reorganized the CWB to market grain through voluntary pooling.

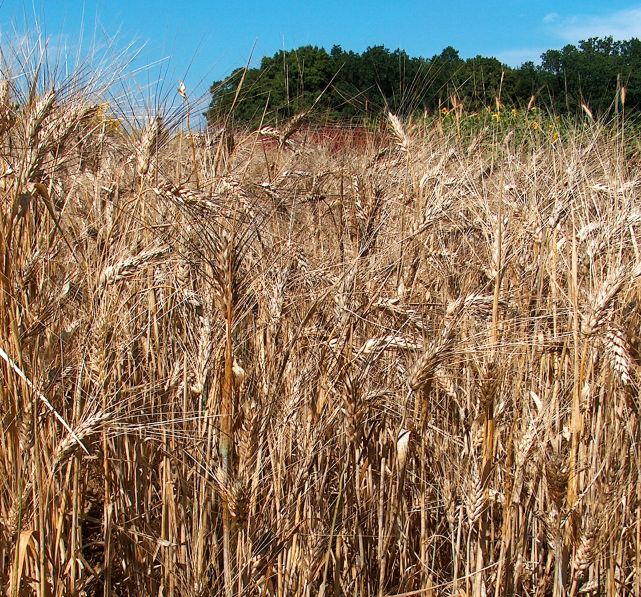
Durum wheat

== Quality grading system ==
Unlike the United States, Canada had a tight grading system established by the Canadian Grain Commission and enforced by the CWB. This enforcement made it "possible to extract premiums for higher quality grain that is not possible in the United States." In an open market system Western Canadian farmers lose the benefits of a grading system.

=== Reorganisation (2006–2012) ===
Since 2006 when the Conservative Party came to power, Chuck Strahl, then Minister of Agriculture, worked towards ending the Wheat Board's Single Desk. This included replacing government appointees on the Board of Directors with individuals who opposed the board's Single Desk, imposing a gag order on Wheat Board staff, dismissing the pro-board President, and intervening in the election of farmer-elected members of the Board of Directors.

- In the December 2006 CWB Board of Directors election, only one of the five farmer-elected seats was won by opponents of the Canadian Wheat Board's Single Desk power over the selling of Canadian wheat and barley internationally. With just one incumbent farmer-elected board member opposed to the Single Desk, only two out of the ten farmer-elected directors were against it. Despite this, the government appointed five members to the board, giving supporters of the Single Desk a narrow eight to seven majority. Some have raised doubts about the results due to Minister of Agriculture Strahl removing over 20,000 farmers from the voters list during the election. These farmers were disqualified for reasons such as not having delivered any grain to the Wheat Board in the past two years or not having produced enough wheat or malt barley to generate significant income for their livelihood.
- December 19, 2006: Chuck Strahl dismissed CWB president Adrian Measner, who was a vocal advocate of the Single Desk system. Strahl justified the decision by stating, "It's a position that [he] serves at [the] pleasure [of the Minister/Government], and that position was no longer his." IIt was suggested that Measner had overstepped by refusing to remove pro-CWB documents from the Board website and by appearing at press conferences with opposition leader Stéphane Dion. The majority of the CWB's board of directors were against the dismissal of Measner.
- March 28, 2007: Barley Plebiscite. 62% of farmers voted to terminate the wheat board's barley Single Desk power. The legislation to amend the act is left unfinished on the order paper when the September 2008 election is called.
- February 26, 2008: The courts rule against the conservative government in a battle over unilaterally dismantling the CWB as it was found to be in violation of the Canadian Wheat Board Act.
- December 7, 2008: In the Board of Directors elections, four out of five candidates elected are in favour of supporting the Single Desk marketing agency.
- January 21, 2010: Supreme Court of Canada ruled in favour of the federal government in its 2006 order prohibiting the board from using its funds for lobbying activities.
- December 7, 2011: Federal Court Judge Douglas Campbell rules that the Conservative government violated the law by introducing legislation to terminate the Wheat Board.
- December 15, 2011: Bill C-18 receives royal assent.
- June 18, 2012: The Federal Court of Appeal upholds Bill C-18.
- August 1, 2012: The end of monopsony takes effect.

=== Wheat farmers, railways and CWB ===
Ian Robson, whose great-grandfather played a role in initiating the co-operative pool system, contended that as a multi-generational small farmer, he relied on the CWB to counterbalance the influence of the railway. Robson asserts, "We're at the mercy of the railways, and the consequences are evident. Transport Canada is tasked with protecting our interests, but they are hesitant to confront the railways." Before the CWB was sold by the federal government to foreign investors in 2014, the CWB owned 3,375 CWB railway cars. By 2014, CP was shaped by CEO Hunter Harrison and activist shareholder Bill Ackman, both of whom were Americans. In October that same year, Americans owned 73% of CP shares while Canadians and Americans each owned 50% of CN. Western Grain Elevator Association's director, Wade Sobkowich, argued that railways were increasing profitability by reducing capacity. At a time when grain farmers are competing with crude oil producers for rail cars, they are not succeeding in getting the rail cars they need.

On September 17, 2014, Transport Minister Lisa Raitt's office announced the decision to issue administrative monetary penalties to CN for failing to meet the minimum volume requirements under the Fair Rail for Grain Farmers Act. The penalty could be up to $100,000 per week at the minister's discretion, a reduction from the initially proposed daily fine. The adjustment from daily to weekly fines drew criticism from NDP agriculture critic Malcolm Allen and Wade Sobkowich who believed the fines were insufficient to address the rail service issues. Despite reports of potential fines, CN's director of communications and public affairs, Mark Hallman, stated that CN had not received any notice of violation or fines. Minister Raitt's office indicated that an enforcement officer was assessing the situation to determine if a notice of violation would be issued.

=== CWB and tendering process ===
In 2006 the four top grain handling companies in Western Canada—Agricore United, Saskatchewan Wheat Pool, Pioneer Grain, and Cargill held nearly 50% of the primary storage capacity. According to University of Saskatchewan professor, Murray Fulton, "This level of concentration, along with a lack of excess capacity" gave grain handling firms market power to raise prices above the cost of providing the service. Since 2001 the CWB encouraged greater competition among the grain companies by "operated a tendering process for approximately 20 to 25 percent of the grain destined for export." The grain handling companies had to enter competitive bids to the CWB. CWB obtained market power by selecting the best bid as one seller as opposed to a large number of sellers (namely farmers) attempting to negotiate the best price.

"The CWB's mandate was to pay farmers a base price for their grain, identify markets, negotiate the best price, deliver the goods, issue advance cheques and make final payment after the crop was sold. If the wheat market went up, farmers pocketed the profits. If the market went down, the government absorbed the loss. Nothing was subtracted from the farmer's share except the cost of marketing and delivery."

— Jake MacDonald The Globe and Mail 2014

==== Modern criticism ====
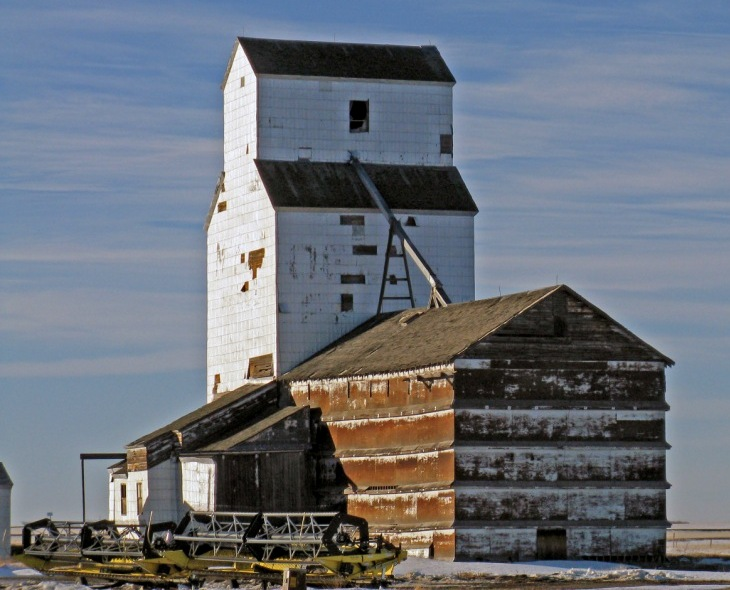
Grain elevator in Wrentham, Alberta

Arguments in favour of privatization believe that farmers should be allowed to opt out of the board. Others believe that they could get a better price for their grain than the board and would like to market their own grain. For many Western Canadian farmers, the argument over the CWB Single Desk was about personal freedom—the freedom to market their production of crops in the manner they choose.

The Single Desk control of price and the ability of farmers to deliver wheat and barley created an interest in other crops, causing a surge in acres of canola and pulse crops—crops with no delivery or price controls. This led to a decline in wheat acres and an increase in other crops. Now, with equal delivery opportunity, relative prices are the driving force in making cropping decisions, leading to an appropriate mix of crops based on relative global demand.

Some opponents of the board's Single Desk power suggested it should be replaced by a 'dual market' system. This was presented as a compromise where board supporters could continue to sell their wheat and barley through the board and board opponents could have the option to sell outside the board. From the standpoint of supporters of the board, however, this was not a viable alternative as a dual market would effectively end the board's Single Desk power and any perceived benefits that it may have given farmers.

Opponents argue that because the perceived benefits farmers received from the CWB increases their land value, elimination of the CWB Single Desk would lower the value of their land. Lower land prices would make Canadian farmers more competitive but could also leave many owing more than the value of their reduced land. Retiring farmers selling their land could be faced with a much reduced retirement fund but new entrants into farming would be able to purchase land at lower cost.

Some CWB opponents have argued that much of the lower quality land is in close proximity to the US border and would be the first to realize the benefits of the US market.

===== Support for the CWB =====
In a September 2011 plebiscite (referendum) conducted by Meyers Norris Penny, 62% of CWB farmers voted that they wanted to keep the wheat board and its Single Desk power. Proponents of maintaining the CWB stated that the collective bargaining power of the wheat board gives farmers a better price than they would have if they were individually marketing to large multi-national corporations. CWB opponents disagreed, arguing that there was no evidence of better returns for farmers. At this time, farmers already had the ability to market all the crops save wheat and malt barley independently, meaning it is possible to succeed marketing grain without board oversight. This, however, may make farmers more susceptible to fluctuations in the commodity market and to focus more of their time on the business aspect of farming, rather than farming. The Wheat Board attempted to offer producers more options in its latter years—for example, farmers could sell their wheat with binding forward contracts to the Wheat Board that attempted to pay the same price that they would get for their grain in the U.S.

Supporters of the board and labour unions believed the CWB gave individual farmers increased marketing power in a world market which got them a higher price than they would have otherwise gotten, not only through the efficiencies of scale, but as well by exercising oligopolistic marketing power on the selling side, especially for Durum wheat, although the evidence of this is weak or non-existent. A study conducted in the mid 1990s suggested that farmers gained on average a premium of $13.35 a tonne on wheat as a result of the board's Single Desk, although the study and its methodology was widely refuted. Supporters of the Single Desk feared that an end to the board would put farmers in a situation like in the early part of the 20th century where farmers effectively competed with each other to sell their grain, effectively putting them at the mercy of big agribusiness and the railroad monopolies, believing that would reduce farm incomes. The counter-argument is that producers of non-Board crops such as canola do not seem to have this problem.

===== American complaints =====
Although the Board was reformed to meet free market conditions under the North American Free Trade Agreement and the World Trade Organization Treaty, American producers continually complained. Despite numerous challenges and much posturing by the United States, the World Trade Organization ruled in 2003 that the Wheat Board was a producer marketing body and not a system for government subsidy although the decision has since been overturned. In fact, Canadian producers have almost no government subsidy while their American and European Union counterparts are heavily subsidized.

===== Western alienation =====
The fact that the Wheat Board primarily marketed crops produced in Western Canada became a source of alienation and even Alberta separatism for many Western Canadian farmers. Farmers in Eastern Canada (east of Manitoba) and most of British Columbia (non-Peace River) were exempt from the CWB's Single Desk control of non-feed wheat and barley—Ontario has its own marketing board, but it is not compulsory.

===== Calls for abolition of the CWB =====
There had been calls by many groups to abolish the Wheat Board. Many of these groups took their fight to the Internet to spread their message and gain support for their cause. While many were focused on the Canadian Wheat Board, others concentrated on international wheat boards, the other primary target being the Australian Wheat Board, before the AWB itself converted to a private firm, leaving the CWB as the only significant agricultural State Trading Enterprise (STE) exporter worldwide, if one ignores Chinese State-Owned Enterprises (SOE). On 7 December 2008, CWB permit book holders voted in favour of maintaining the wheat board by electing four pro-board candidates with one marketing choice candidate being elected. Stewart Wells, president of the National Farmers Union, said "The message can't be any clearer". Others argued that the voter's list was flawed, as it included many small or part-time producers who may not deliver to the Board, as well as non-producers such as landowners whose livelihood might not solely rely on farming. In December 2008, the draft modalities text of the Doha Development Round was revised such that upon signing in its revised form, the CWB would lose statutory privileges such as the Single Desk within five years of the signing.

=== Transfer of CWB to Foreign Hands (2012–2015) ===
One of the aims of the Conservative government since coming to power in January 2006 was to end the Single Desk marketing power on Western Canadian wheat and barley. The Conservatives had been unable to get this change approved by Parliament because they held a minority of seats until the May 2011 federal election and all opposition parties supported the Single Desk. The Conservatives also lost a court battle to unilaterally dismantle the CWB without an act of Parliament. In the aftermath, Harper and then Minister of Agriculture Chuck Strahl stated their intent to continue with the removal of the traditional role of the CWB, particularly in regards to barley (which is generally a more corporate crop), perhaps through Parliamentary action.

After winning a majority in the May 2011 general election, the Conservative government announced its intention to remove the CWB Single Desk through legislation. In response, the CWB held plebiscites on whether to keep the Single Desk power on wheat and barley. The results were released on September 12, 2011; 51 percent of barley growers and 62 percent of wheat growers voted to maintain the board's Single Desk. Notwithstanding, the government removed the Single Desk on August 1, 2012 ignoring the plebiscites' results. In defending this policy, Agriculture Minister Gerry Ritz claimed the CWB plebiscites were seriously flawed and that the Conservatives' election victory gave them a mandate to remove the Single Desk.

According to the CWB, the government advanced the timetables to Christmas 2011, prompting them to launch a protest campaign urging Canadians as well as farmers to speak out against the government's decision to end the Single Desk. Meanwhile, the government issued leaflets explaining what would "bring marketing freedom."

The Marketing Freedom for Grain Farmers Act instituted a timeline for the eventual privatization of CWB, requiring the board to formulate a plan by 2016, to be implemented in 2017. On April 15, 2015, it was announced that a 50.1% majority stake in CWB would be acquired by Global Grain Group, a joint venture between Bunge Canada—a subsidiary of Bunge Limited, and SALIC Canada—a subsidiary of the Saudi Agricultural and Livestock Investment Company, for $250 million. The remaining equity of CWB will be held by its member farmers.

The sale to G3 took place while a "Farmers of North America" led group of Western Canadian farmers attempted to raise funds to purchase the CWB and keep it Canadian farmer owned rather than selling it to foreign corporations. The group was rebuffed despite having a higher offer, on grounds that they had not raised the funds.

On 12 June 2015, the Department of Finance released draft legislation to handle the tax consequence to farmers, and to the Trust which will hold 49.9% of CWB in trust for farmers (proposed section 135.2 of the Income Tax Act). No news release was issued to explain the legislation. An explanation of how the legislation works is included in the 48th edition of Carswell's Practitioner's Income Tax Act and Carswell's Taxnet Pro.

== See also ==
- William Craig McNamara – President of the Canadian Wheat Board until 1970.
- Minister of Fisheries and Oceans (Canada), ministry responsible for Freshwater Fish Marketing Corporation (FFMC), a monopsony for commercial freshwater fishermen in northwestern Ontario, Manitoba, Saskatchewan, Alberta and the Northwest Territories
- Wheat pools in Canada
- Federation of Quebec Maple Syrup Producers
